= La-Mansh =

La-Mansh Ла-Манш
- Anna Bezel from La-Mansh (1999)

Background information
- Origin: Ivano-Frankivsk, Ukraine
- Genres: post rock; trip hop
- Years active: 1998–2000
- Label: Nova Records

La-Mansh (Ukrainian: Ла-Манш, lit. 'English Channel') is a Ukrainian rock band from Ivano-Frankivsk, which existed from 1998 to 2000.

La-Mansh was founded by former members of the art rock band Rara Avis, who wanted to play more commercial music. Inspired by the likes of Garbage and Portishead, they began to perform rock music with female vocals. The young band became a festival winner, attracted the attention of producers, and signed a contract with the Nova Records label. The band gained wide popularity with the film Brother 2, in which the song "Poglyad" (Ukrainian: Погляд, lit. 'Sight') was performed.

Having recorded only five songs, La-Mansh unexpectedly broke up in late 2000, never releasing an album. In 2023, Znovu Sonce EP (Ukrainian: Знову сонце, lit. 'The Sun Again') was released, which contained already well-known compositions and was dedicated to the memory of the band's guitarist and songwriter, Vitaliy Bykovets.

== History ==
=== Formation ===
The band La-Mansh was founded on January 1, 1998, in Ivano-Frankivsk. Its initiators were former members of the band Rara Avis (Latin: Rara avis, lit. 'rare bird') Oleksandr Tokarev (bass guitar), Yarema Kovaliv (keyboards), Vitaliy "Bily" Bykovets (guitar) and Anna Bezel (vocals). In Rara Avis they performed original music under the direction of violinist Andriy Bak, although they had different musical tastes and backgrounds: in particular, Oleksandr Tokarev had previously played thrash metal, and 16-year-old Anna Bezel studied at a music school. As part of Rara Avis, they managed to record one album together. When Andriy Bak left the band to study in Germany, the remaining musicians started thinking about what to do next.

After participating in the festival, where another Ivano-Frankivsk band, Morra, took the prize, the musicians of Rara Avis felt the need to change their style. Instead of complex but uncommercial music, they decided to play something simpler that would bring in money in the difficult nineties. At that time, rock bands with female vocals, such as Portishead or Garbage, were popular in the world, so the musicians decided to stick to this style in the future. Along with the change in style, each of the members proposed a new name for the band, eventually choosing Oleksandr Tokarev's version—the name "La-Mansh" (Ukrainian: Ла-Манш, lit. 'English Channel'), which was easier to remember.

An important role in the success of the band was played by the former leader of Morra, Dmytro Tsyperdyuk, who moved to Kyiv as an expert on rock music at a festival. He came to the rehearsal of La-Mansh and offered to help the musicians with the sound and arrangements of their songs. "They are great musicians with their style, but they didn't know how to formalize it all," Tsyperdyuk recalled. The first result of their collaboration was the song "Poglyad" (Ukrainian: Погляд, lit. 'Sight'), which caused a sensation on the Ukrainian music scene. The song brought the band the first prize in the pop music genre at two festivals in 1998.

La-Mansh was immediately noticed by specialists, and in January 1999 the band began working with the Kyiv production agency Nemo and signed a contract to record their debut album with Nova Records label. The band's producer was Vitaliy Klymov, known for his work with the bands Tabula Rasa and Okean Elzy. In the spring of 1999, drummer Oleksandr Ilchenko, who had previously played in the band Okrug-2000, joined the band. In August 1999, the band recorded the final versions of the first five songs for the new album. By the end of April 2000, it was planned to shoot a music video for the song "Sama sobi vesna" (Ukrainian: Сама собі весна, lit. 'Spring itself'). The album was scheduled for release in the fall of 2000.

=== Brother 2 soundtrack ===
The band's greatest success was associated with the film Brother 2, released in 2000. Alexey Balabanov's new film was a sequel to his film Brother, released in 1997. While the soundtrack of the first film consisted almost entirely of songs by Vyacheslav Butusov and the band Nautilus Pompilius, for the second film, the director asked the general producer of Nashe Radio station Mikhail Kozyrev to select songs by contemporary musicians. As a result, the film featured music by the most relevant performers of the time, including three Ukrainian bands – Okean Elzy, Vopli Vidopliassova and La-Mansh.

The film became incredibly popular. The songs from the movie were released as a soundtrack album. It was recognized as the best soundtrack of the year and became a record holder in terms of sales. On September 9, 2000, La-Mansh performed at a major concert, Brother-2 Live at the Olympic Stadium, dedicated to the release of the soundtrack. In addition to them, the stage was also filled with performers such as Smyslovye Gallyutsinatsii, Okean Elzy, Nike Borzov, Aquarium, Agatha Christie, Bi-2, and Vadim Samoilov.

=== Breakup ===
At the end of 2000, La-Mansh suddenly broke up. Producer Vitaly Klimov recalled that the investments had run out and the band had to leave Kyiv: "This is, in general, my cross, because I really love the music of La-Mansh. Listening to the recordings we made, I still think that this is cool material. My soul still hurts". Bass guitarist Oleksandr Tokarev said that "the circumstances coincided: sometimes financial, and sometimes other things; we were young, and the times were difficult", and admitted that he "had a lot of studio work, maybe this pushed us to finish La-Mansh". Dmytro Tsyperdyuk did not know about the circumstances of the band's breakup, but suggested that it could have been "some internal problems in the group, which the producers saw, and because of this, they were afraid to invest their money in the band".

After the breakup of La-Mansh, bass guitarist Oleksandr Tokarev played for some time in the band GreenJolly, then worked as a session musician (the band LG, Iryna Bilyk, Oksana Bilozir), was engaged in advertising and video production. Drummer Oleksandr Ilchenko moved to the USA. Vocalist Anna Bezel moved to the USA; together with her husband, she founded the company, which provides people with access to Amazonian plants. Keyboardist Yarema Kovaliv worked as a lawyer and civil servant, and from 2015 to 2017 he headed the State Agency of Fisheries of Ukraine. Guitarist Vitaliy Bykovets worked as an administrator at the Central City Library of Ivano-Frankivsk. He died on February 2, 2020.

In 2023, former band members Anna Bezel, Oleksandr Tokarev, and Yarema Kovaliv released The Sun Again EP on digital platforms, which contained five songs recorded by La-Mansh in the late 1990s. The release was dedicated to the memory of Vitaliy Bykovets: "Jamming eternally in our hearts, this LP is dedicated to Vitaliy (Bilyi) Bykovets—the soul and sound of our band. Each note carries a cherished memory, and every song resonates with his spirit. Keep on rocking, dear friend."

== Musical style ==
La-Mansh - Poglyad

В твоїх очах залишу я бездонний жаль
Безмежну тугу і печаль
Не відпускай, не відпускай ніколи
Своїх очей печаль зимову

In your eyes I will leave bottomless regret
Endless longing and sadness
Don't let go, never let go
The winter sadness of your eyes

Even though La-Mansh was founded by former members of the band Rara Avis, these bands had different musical styles. In Rara Avis the musicians played folk rock and art rock with violins. Not all the band members liked this music, and as Oleksandr Tokarev later recalled, in the new band "we had to love what we were playing". La-Mansh was inspired by bands like Portishead or Garbage, which were popular in the mid-nineties, and performed rock music with female vocals with a noticeable influence of trip hop.

Dmytro Tsyperdyuk was responsible for the sound and arrangements of the band, and Vitaly Telezin became the sound producer, whom Tsyperdyuk persuaded to move from Ivano-Frankivsk to Kyiv. The band was notable for its extraordinary aesthetics and unusual stage presentation, combining "unearthly" female vocals, guitar licks and electronic sound. Okko streaming service reviewer Andriy Gorelikov called La-Mansh an interesting band, similar to the rock band Masha i Medvedi. Journalist Ilya Legostaev compared the Ukrainian band to Garbage and other musicians who successfully combined guitar and electronic music.

During its short existence, the band managed to record only five songs:

- "Dotyk" (Ukrainian: Дотик, lit. 'Touch'),
- "Ye-ye-ye" (Ukrainian: Є-є-є),
- "Poglyad" (Ukrainian: Погляд, lit. 'Sight'),
- "Sama sobi vesna" (Ukrainian: Сама собі весна, lit. 'Spring itself')
- "Sonce" (Ukrainian: Сонце, lit. 'Sun').

The authors of most of the songs, including the biggest hit "Poglyad", were the band members: the lyrics were written by guitarist Vitaly Bykovets, and the instrumental parts by each of the musicians. The only exception was the song "Ye-ye-ye", the music and lyrics of which were written by Tsyperdyuk.

== Band members ==
- Anna Bezel – vocals
- Oleksandr Tokarev – bass guitar,
- Yarema Kovaliv – keyboards,
- Vitaly Bikovets – guitar,
- Oleksandr Ilchenko – drums.

== Discography ==
Compilations

- 1999 — Upgrade (Nova Records) — song «Poglyad»
- 1999 — Perlyny Sezonu 98 (Rostok Records) — song «Ye-ye-ye»
- 2000 — Brother 2 OST (Real Records) — song «Poglyad»
- 2000 — Nashestvie. Shag chetvertyy (Real Records) — song «Sama sobi vesna»
- 2000 — Upgrade 2 (Nova Records) — song «Sama sobi vesna»
- 2000 — Perlyny Sezonu. 5 rokiv v ukrains'komu showbizi (Gold Lion) — song «Poglyad»

EP

- 2023 — Znovu Sonce (La-Mansh Records)
