= Brother 3 =

- Russian: Брат 3
- Directed by: Valery Pereverzev
- Release date: 2024
- Country: Russia
- Language: Russian
- Budget: 814 083,60$
- Box office: 5 867$

Brother 3 (Russian: Брат 3, translit. Brat 3 or Brat III) is a Russian crime movie directed by Valery Pereverzev that is an unlicensed sequel to Brother and Brother 2. The film's premiere was delayed several times, but it was eventually released on February 1, 2024.

Despite the negative reaction from viewers to the film, critics gave the films mixed reviews. They praised the project for the acting, some plot elements and ambition, but criticized the soundtrack, the lack of connection with Balabanov’s duology, as well as the editing.

== Production ==
Initially, Aleksei Balabanov planned to shoot the second and third films simultaneously. However, the script seemed boring and it was decided to combine the two into Brother 2. After the success of the second film Balobanov refused to shoot a third. Then Sergei Bodrov Jr. and Aleksei Balabanov died.

In 2019, rumors held that Stanislav Baretsky would make Brother 3, with Kirill Tereshin, Bari Alibasov, Marina Anissina, Olga Buzova, Viacheslav Datsik, Nikita Dzhigurda, Viktor Sukhorukov and Sergey Shnurov. According to Boretsky, “people have been singled out from the ritual business”. Tereshin, nicknamed “Ruki-Bazuki”, declared that, for the sake of his leading role, he would remove his pumped bitsoptsy from synthol.

The film's script is complete and some scenes have been shot. Filming is to be complete by 2020.

At the end of July 2019, filming began in the Krasnogorsk region near Moscow. However, the studio's plans changed and it was decided to remove Vyacheslav Datsik from the main role. It was decided that instead of Datsik, the main role will be played by the American actor Mickey Rourke. Concerning the filming in the film, they were negotiating with Diana Shurygina and the Hollywood star Jennifer Aniston. However, the celebrity requested a large amount of money for her work. On August 1, 2019, Boretsky announced that an old friend Danila Bagrov would appear in the film, performed by Sergei Bodrov Jr. using CGI. On September 6, 2019, Boretsky announced VK that he was selling one of the main roles in the film for five million rubles. Later, Baretsky opened a site dedicated to the film, on which a list of actors was posted.

In November, a prequel to the film appeared on YouTube, in which Dmitry Nagiyev took part as the criminal authority Nagibaev, as well as little-known bloggers. The prequel was coldly received by the public, but the audience praised some moments, like the Nagiyev cameo.

== Criticism of film production ==
The film ultimately received mixed reviews from critics, but viewers mostly criticized the project. CTB Film Company's producer Sergei Selyanov said that Stanislav Baretsky was trying to profit at the expense of Balabanov's cult films, that his company wouldn't give him film rights and might seek opportunity to sue him. Actor Viktor Sukhorukov stated that he had no interest in getting involved with Baretsky's Brother 3, as well as Irina Saltykova who characterized the authors as "clowns".

Svetlana Bodrova, widow of Sergei Bodrov Jr., heavily criticized the film crew and called the production "a horrible drivel".
