= Time Is Money =

Time Is Money may refer to:

- Time is money (aphorism), aphorism that appeared in a 1748 essay by Benjamin Franklin

== Music ==
- Time Is Money (SPM album), a 2000 hip hop album
- Time Is Money (Styles P album), a 2006 hip hop album
- "Time Is Money (Bastard)", a 1985 single by Swans
- "Time Is Money", a song featuring Winston McCall, from the You Me at Six album Sinners Never Sleep

== Film and television ==
- "Time Is Money" (DuckTales), a 1988 DuckTales TV film, reedited into five episodes of the series
- Time Is Money (film), a 1923 German silent film
- Time Is Money, a pricing game on the game show The Price Is Right
- Time Is Money, a British quiz show premiering in 2026 on ITV, hosted by Sara Davies

== See also ==
- Time value (disambiguation)
