= Brother (1997 film) =

- Russian theatrical release poster
- Directed by: Aleksei Balabanov
- Written by: Aleksei Balabanov
- Produced by: Sergei Selyanov
- Starring: Sergei Bodrov, Jr. Viktor Sukhorukov; Yury Kuznetsov
- Music by: Vyacheslav Butusov
- Production company: CTB Film Company
- Distributed by: Kino International Corp.
- Release date: 17 May 1997 (Cannes)
- Running time: 95 minutes
- Country: Russia
- Language: Russian
- Budget: $10,000
- Box office: $1.4 million

Brother (Russian: Брат, romanized: Brat) is a 1997 Russian neo-noir crime drama film written and directed by Aleksei Balabanov. The film stars Sergei Bodrov Jr. as Danila Bagrov, a young ex-soldier who becomes embroiled with the Saint Petersburg mob through his criminal older brother. It appeared in the Un Certain Regard section at the 1997 Cannes Film Festival.

After its release on VHS in June 1997, Brother unexpectedly became one of the most commercially successful Russian films of the 1990s and quickly rose to cult film status throughout Russia. Due to the film's popularity and fan demand, a sequel, Brother 2, was released in 2000.

== Plot ==
Danila Bagrov (Sergei Bodrov Jr.), recently discharged after serving in the First Chechen War, returns to his hometown. His mother insists that he travel to Saint Petersburg to seek out his successful older brother Viktor (Viktor Sukhorukov), who his mother is confident will help him make a living. Arriving in Saint Petersburg, Danila wanders around the city and befriends Kat (Maria Zhukova), an energetic party girl, and an elderly Russian German named Hoffman (Yury Kuznetsov), a homeless street vendor whom Danila rescues from a thug attempting to extort him.

Unbeknown to their mother, Viktor is an accomplished hitman who goes by the nickname "Tatar", working for a St. Petersburg mafia boss called "Krugly" (Russian for "round"). His latest target is "the Chechen", a Chechen mafia boss who had seized a local market. Krugly (Sergei Murzin), who is unhappy with the amount of money that Viktor has demanded for the hit, orders his thugs to watch the Chechen, so that they can kill Viktor after the hit and thereby avoid paying him.

Danila eventually meets up with Viktor. To avoid exposure, Viktor passes his assignment to his brother, gives him money to settle in the city, and then lies to him that the Chechen has been extorting from him, asking Danila to perform the hit. Danila agrees.

Through Hoffman's friends, Danila rents a room in the apartment of an elderly alcoholic war veteran. Arriving in the market in a disguise, Danila detonates several homemade explosives as a distraction, and, taking advantage of the confusion, kills the Chechen, but Krugly's men pursue Danila and manage to wound him. Danila barely escapes the pursuit, jumping onto a freight tram, and in a shootout kills one of the bandits. Tram driver Sveta (Svetlana Pismichenko) offers to help the wounded Danila, but he refuses, promising to find her later and thank her.

After Danila recovers with Hoffman's help, he sets off to look for Sveta. A relationship develops between them, despite Sveta having a husband who is rarely home and who constantly beats her. Meanwhile, Krugly finds the tram on which Danila escaped and asks Sveta about it, who puts Krugly on a false trail. Krugly promises to punish her if she deceived them.

Danila goes to visit Sveta, having bought her a radio with a CD player as a gift. Left alone in the room, he runs into her husband, who unexpectedly arrives. Danila takes the keys to the room from him and forbids him to show up in the future.

After going to a party with Kat and having sex with her, Danila wakes up in his apartment to a phone call from Viktor. Pretending to be ill, Viktor asks him to take part in another job in his place, and Danila agrees again. Meanwhile, Krugliy decides to draw the Tatar into a combined raid. Danila meets the two bandits and together they go to an apartment where the target is supposed to appear. Taking the owner of the apartment hostage, they wait for the target, who has gone to get some vodka. At the same time, a group of local musicians is celebrating a birthday one floor above, and one of the guests, sound engineer Stepan, mistakes the floor and ends up in the apartment where Danila and the bandits are. Stepan turns out to be an unwanted witness, and the bandits take him hostage. Danila promises him that he will not be harmed.

Some time later, Vyacheslav Butusov (cameo) also calls the apartment by mistake. Danila follows Butusov up to the apartment on the floor above and listens to the music. Returning to the apartment and seeing that the bandits have killed the owner and are about to deal with Stepan, Danila says that he will do it himself, takes a gun from one of the bandits, but unexpectedly shoots the two bandits. With Stepan's help, he hides the bodies in the cemetery and asks Hoffman to bury them.

Krugly and his men begin hunting for Danila. They come to Sveta, beat and rape her, but they fail to learn anything about Danila. A bandit nicknamed Krot sets up an ambush for Danila, but Danila manages to survive and kill Krot. Coming to Sveta and seeing her beaten, Danila learns that this is Krugly's work.

Krugly takes Viktor hostage and, threatening to kill him, demands that he hand over Danila and return the money. At this point, Danila calls his brother and is suspicious after hearing his frightened voice. Danila buys a shotgun from his landlord, makes a sawed-off shotgun out of it and, rescuing his brother, kills Krugly and his men. In light of these events, Viktor is afraid that Danila will punish him for betrayal, but Danila calms him down, remembering sentimental memories from their childhood.

Danila takes the briefcase with money from the apartment and advises his brother to return home to his mother and get a job with the police. Then he comes to Sveta, but, having witnessed her husband beating her again, he shoots him in the legs with the sawed-off shotgun. Unexpectedly for Danila, Sveta rushes to help her abusive husband, shouting at Danila that she does not love him and demanding that he leave.

Having left Sveta, a frustrated Danila goes to Hoffman, discusses with him the pernicious influence of the big city on people and finally offers him money, but he refuses. Then Danila meets Kat, tells her about his departure and gives her a wad of rubles.

The film ends with Danila walking out onto a snowy highway and hitchhiking toward Moscow.

== Cast ==
- Sergei Bodrov Jr. – Danila Bagrov
- Viktor Sukhorukov – Viktor Bagrov (voiced by Aleksei Poluyan)
- Svetlana Pismichenko – Sveta
- Maria Zhukova – Kat
- Yury Kuznetsov – "The German" Hoffman
- Irina Rakshina – Zinka
- Sergei Murzin – Roundhead (voiced by Aleksandr Stroev)
- Andrey Fyodortsov – Stepan
- Igor Shibanov – Militiaman
- Andrey Krasko – Owner of the raided apartment
- Aleksei Poluyan – "Mole" the bandit
- Igor Lifanov – One of Roundhead's bandits (voiced by Aleksandr Bashirov)
- Tatiana Zakharova – Danila's and Viktor's mother (voiced by Nina Usatova)
- Sergei Debizhev – Music video director (voiced by Valery Kukhareshin)
- Konstantin Anisimov – Music video security guard (voiced by Viktor Bychkov)
- Anatoly Gorin – Sveta's roommate (voiced by Viktor Bychkov)

The film also features brief appearances from several Russian rock musicians:

- Vyacheslav Butusov, as well as other members of Nautilus Pompilius
- Sergey Chigrakov
- Nastya Poleva
- Band members of Aquarium
- Band members of Kolibri

== Production ==
=== Concept ===
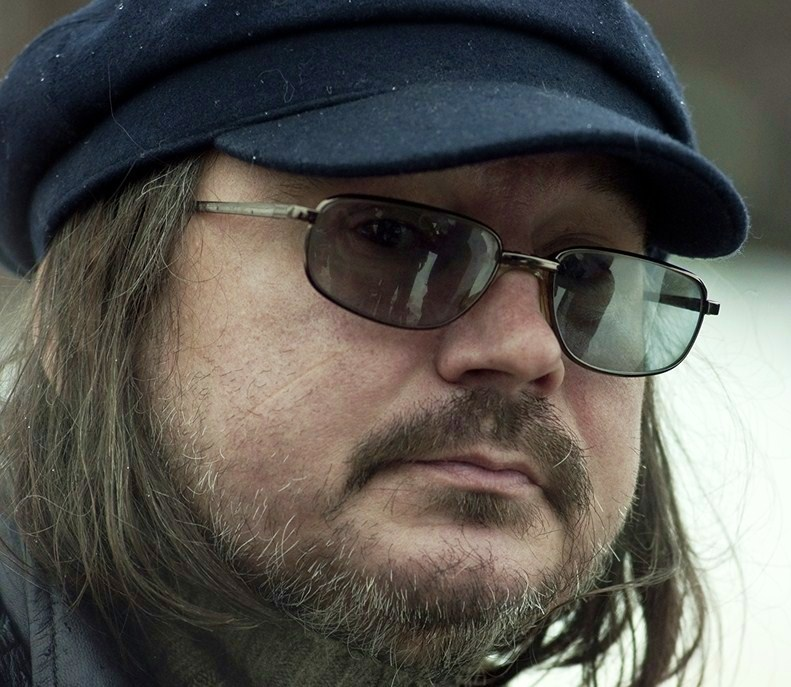
Director and scriptwriter of the film Aleksei Balabanov

According to director Aleksei Balabanov, the concept of Brother was born from his old idea to make a film about bandits and musicians, since he was close to both. Music was to play a prominent role in this concept. Looking for a suitable soundtrack, Balabanov chose the band Nautilus Pompilius, since he had been friends with the vocalist Vyacheslav Butusov since his time in Sverdlovsk. Other musicians invited to filming included the band Aquarium and vocalists Nastya Poleva and Sergey Chigrakov (the latter from the band Chizh & Co).

There are some elements of the draft that are different from the film, such as:

- Sveta and her husband Pavel are into sadomasochism. During filming, Balabanov rewrote these scenes to instead feature domestic violence, but later explored the theme of BDSM in his next film, Of Freaks and Men.
- The criminal showdown and the house concert took place in the same apartment. Director Stepan was not a random hostage, but the organizer of the house concert. The target was a rock producer who imposed a tribute on musicians for the opportunity to perform on television. Realizing that Viktor set him up with this showdown and that the bandits wanted to shoot not only the producer, but also all the musicians gathered in the apartment, Danila kills his accomplices right in the next room.
- Krugly does not say proverbs.
- Some characters are missing, such as Kat, the Caucasians who did not pay for the tram fare, and various minor characters.
- Danila makes a bulletproof vest from CDs sewn together.

=== Filming ===
The film was shot in thirty-one days. According to producer Sergei Selyanov, the film cost about 10,000 US dollars to shoot. Many actors worked for a nominal fee or for free. According to Svetlana Pismichenko, who played Sveta, she was paid a thousand dollars for her role. During filming, she wore her own clothes that she also wore to the audition. She was trained to drive a tram specifically for the role. The large-knit sweater worn by Danila was bought by the artist Nadezhda Vasilyeva at a flea market for forty rubles. In the last scene, the truck driver who picked up Danila was played by the film's cameraman Sergei Astakhov; by the end of filming, Balabanov had not found an actor who could drive a truck, and the stuntmen did not suit him. The Nautilus Pompilius that Sveta and Danila attend was actually a concert of the band Chizh & Co. According to Pismichenko, drunken fans at the concert almost trampled over her and Bodrov in the crowd.

== Themes ==
According to producer Sergei Selyanov, one of the main goals of Brother was to capture the transition from the "communal system of life" under socialism to the "individual responsibility" of capitalism. He noted that "in the 1990s, the individual had a chance to realize himself to the fullest," but family ties lost meaning. Balabanov wanted to show the importance and value of lost connections, even though Danila was alone in confronting all the circumstances of the world around him.

Literary critic and publicist Viktor Toporov, studying the draft version of the script, noted that it is connected with other Balabanov films, both previous and subsequent, through various details:

Balabanov's integrity becomes especially obvious in the process of reading the film scripts he wrote, the internal connections between which become something like a single circulatory system.

[...]

There is one amazing thread sticking out of the script of Brother, and by pulling on it, almost half of Balabanov's work can be unraveled. Danila's "mature" girlfriend, a tram driver who has been pretty battered by life, turns out to be an inveterate bottom here: she likes being tortured and she keeps in the closet - and readily uses on herself - almost the entire arsenal of SM. Which, on the one hand, ties her together (forgive me this pun) with both the "porn divas" from Freaks and the daughter of the district committee secretary from Cargo 200, and on the other, in a purely Fassbinderian way, turns her into the long-suffering Mother Russia!

Film critic Anton Dolin describes Danila as "a man who has fallen out of context, living in a time of great change, but who has ceased to feel History." In his opinion, Danila needs his close and dear ones, but he does not find them, or finds in them something other than what he was looking for:

A character close to the viewer, almost family, living in the world of the film - the main, if not the only film for the entire 1990s, exhaustively describing and summarizing that turning point decade. And, of course, the main one for Balabanov. It does not yet have the postcard popular style of Brother 2 nor the hard guignol of Cargo 200, but it no longer smells of the esoteric thoughtfulness of Happy Days and The Castle. But there is what Balabanov would later define as "fantastic realism," where unvarnished documentary borders on extreme conventionality. Tough, clear, dashing, frank, naive, poetic, musical, not containing a single unnecessary frame or word. With amazing acting, its organic nature and energy going far beyond the concept of "acting" - like De Niro in Taxi Driver or Huppert in The Piano Teacher. Perfectly fitting the definition of a "masterpiece".

[...]

Brother is either a tragedy or a comedy of the loneliness of the hero, who dreamed of loved ones, but ended up with his pistol in the Lutheran cemetery in the company of a German and a director who is scared to death of him. It is as if he has a presentiment that new times are about to come, in which there will be no place for either the author or the actor. And the hero will be appropriated and called "brother" by the trivial thieves from Krugly's gang - those who unsuccessfully tried to kill him in the film. In fact, Danila Bagrov did not have any brothers. He was the only one.

— Anton Dolin, review for Meduza for the 20th anniversary of the film

Twenty years after the film's release, Viktor Sukhorukov, who played Viktor in the film, noted both the heroism and contradictory nature of Danila:

The need for heroes has always existed, starting from epics, bylinas, and fairy tales. What is a hero? He is the main horse in the troika. That black horse that pulls this chariot, cart, wheelbarrow, carriage. Do we have one today? No. A hero must be born. Only not through ideology, but through resistance, through a clash of positions.

[...]

Danya Bagrov served his country on a certain front, returned and decided to help his brother. Each of us has such a contradiction of good, evil, love, hate, strength, and weakness mixed in us. In this contradiction, we must find a hero who will unite the weak and the strong in himself - and say: "Yes, you can live with this! And not lose, and get rich, and be strong, and be saved."

— Interview with Viktor Sukhorukov on Meduza

Journalist and critic Yuri Saprykin defined Danila's personality as a blank slate, on which are listed the names of his closest relatives, a few moral truisms ("the weak must be protected"), several innate social instincts ("I'm not very fond of Jews") and the name of his favorite band ("Nautilus Pompilius"). Saprykin characterizes Bagrov's signature unflappable shooting style as "the fastest movement towards the goal, with all ethical corners cut off; the simplest solution for any problem, he is like a bullet that flies in a straight line."

Danila aims at a businessman with the same readiness as he does at an ordinary bandit or a careless husband, and he would shoot a random passerby with the same thoughtless readiness if he were in the bullet's path. Class enmity is absent from his simple value grid, where only the division into friends and foes is important, and with the exception of the Tatar, who is always a friend because he is a brother, this division is always established by chance, according to the situation.

— Yuri Saprykin, review in Kommersant for the 20th anniversary of the film

Saprykin also agrees with the author of Balabanov's biography, Maria Kuvshinova, regarding the role of Hoffman, who he see as a kind of alter ego of Balabanov.

== Release ==
Brother was selected for screening at a number of Russian and international film festivals, where it won many awards. The festivals include, among others:

- Cannes Film Festival, Un Certain Regard
- Chicago International Film Festival
- Sozvezdie
- Torino International Film Festival
- Trieste International Film Festival

The domestic premiere took place at the St. Petersburg Cinema House in 1997. After attending the premiere, critic Sergei Dobrotvorsky said that Brother would become "the main event of the country." The film was released on VHS in June 1997. It premiered on television on 12 December 1997 on the NTV channel.

On 24 March 2022, the film, along with its sequel, was re-released in cinemas. Vesti.ru noted that "the first day of the film's re-release brought in 7 million rubles, which for the current situation is an excellent result. Foreign releases earn much less in a weekend than Brother earned in a day." The film's producer, Sergei Selyanov, admitted that "We didn't make any predictions, but the result exceeded our wildest expectations. We were impressed that viewers who had seen both films 10-20 times still came to the cinema. The films seem to be legendary, unsurprisingly, but it’s still amazing." As of 3 April 2022, the film's re-release collected 59.5 million rubles or 577,000 US dollars with an audience of 219,000.

== Reception ==
=== Critical response ===
Brother has an approval rating of 100% on review aggregator website Rotten Tomatoes, based on 5 reviews, and an average rating of 7.63/10.

== Music ==
=== Track listing ===
No.	Title	Artist(s)	Length
1.	"Во время дождя (Vo vremya dozhdya)"	Nautilus Pompilius	3:49
2.	"Крылья (Krylya)"	Nautilus Pompilius	3:48
3.	"Нежный вампир (Nezhny vampir)"	Nautilus Pompilius	3:53
4.	"Три царя (Tri tsarya)"	Nautilus Pompilius	4:25
5.	"Воздух (Vozdukh)"	Nautilus Pompilius	5:16
6.	"Люди на холме (Lyudi na kholme)"	Nautilus Pompilius	5:09
7.	"Летучий фрегат (Letuchy fregat)"	Anastasia Poleva	3:21
8.	"Матерь богов (Mater bogov)"	Nautilus Pompilius	4:37
9.	"Хлоп-хлоп (Khlop-khlop)"	Nautilus Pompilius	4:00
10.	"Даром (Darom)"	Anastasia Poleva	3:51
11.	"Чёрные птицы (Chyornye ptitsy)"	Nautilus Pompilius	3:26
12.	"Зверь (Zver)"	Nautilus Pompilius	6:59
13.	"Люди на холме (демо) (Lyudi na kholme (demo))"	Nautilus Pompilius	3:20

Other songs featured in the film are "Max Don't Have Sex With Your Ex" by E-rotic, "Coz I Luv You" by Slade, and "Giamaica" by Robertino Loreti

== Sequel ==
Following the film's success, Balabanov initially planned to make two sequels: the second instalment was to take place in Moscow and the third in United States. During the writing phase, however, he abandoned this idea and combined the second and third parts into a single sequel instead. Brother 2 is notable for having a significantly higher budget, placing more emphasis on action sequences, and being set in Moscow and Chicago.

In September 2022, the publishing house Bubble Comics released a comic collection, Brother: 25 years, for the 25th anniversary of the film. The collection contains stories about Bagrov and other characters, some from the films and some new. One of the artists of the project is Andrey Vasin, who worked on the comics Igor Grom and Besoboy.

== Legacy ==
In 2016, producer Sergei Selyanov noted that in the 2000s and 2010s, there was no character in Russian cinema who had as strong an image as Danila Bagrov.

In the 2018 music video for her song "90", the Russian singer-songwriter Monetochka reenacts scenes from Brother.

== Literature ==
- MacKay, John (2015). "Balabanov's Brother (1997): Cinema as salvage operation". Senses of Cinema.
- Österberg, Ira (2018). What Is That Song? Aleksej Balabanov's Brother and Rock as Film Music in Russian Cinema (Ph.D. thesis). University of Helsinki. ISBN 978-951-51-4124-8.
- Weinhold, Florian (2013). Path of Blood: The Post-Soviet Gangster, His Mistress and Their Others in Aleksei Balabanov's Genre Films. North Charleston, SC: Reaverlands Books. pp. 39–65. ISBN 9781482300475.
