= Dead Man's Bluff =

- Russian DVD cover
- Directed by: Aleksei Balabanov
- Written by: Aleksei Balabanov; Stas Mokhnachev
- Produced by: Sergei Dolgoshein; Sergei Selyanov
- Starring: Aleksei Panin; Dmitri Dyuzhev; Nikita Mikhalkov
- Cinematography: Yevgeni Privin
- Edited by: Tatyana Kuzmichyova
- Music by: Vyacheslav Butusov
- Production company: STV Cinema Company
- Release date: May 24, 2005
- Running time: 105 min.
- Country: Russia
- Language: Russian

Dead Man's Bluff or Zhmurki (Russian: Жмурки) is a 2005 Russian black comedy/crime film.

Director Aleksei Balabanov, who directed Brother and Brother 2, uses cameo performances, by Russia's most prominent actors. The film depicts the anarchistic reality of the free-market streets of Russia in the beginning of the 1990s, where the only real liberty was the freedom to kill.

== Plot ==
The film opens in 2005 with a professor lecturing a group of university students on the primitive accumulation of capital. As an example, she mentions how capital was accumulated during the 1990s.

The film flashes to Nizhny Novgorod in 1995, to an interrogation scene between a torturer known by the nickname "Hangman", and a gagged prisoner. Three masked men barge in with pistols. They kill the Hangman's hostage and wound him. The leader of the masked men takes off his disguise and it is revealed that he is a police officer named Stepan. Stepan shoots the Hangman dead and takes a piece of paper from his pocket. The film then introduces the audience to three bandits: Koron, Bala, and Eggplant. The trio discuss their current lack of opportunities when they get a phone call from Stepan, who hires them for a new job.

The film jumps to the protagonists, Semyon (nicknamed "Simon") and Sergei, two young bandits working for Sergei Mikhailovich (usually referred to as "Mikhalych"), a local crime boss who controls the drug trade in the city. Mikhalych sends Simon and Sergei to intimidate a drug lab into paying protection money. After arriving at the lab, Sergei attempts to do the talking, but is ambushed and the situation ends with Simon shooting everyone in the lab. To try to make up for the situation going wrong, the two collect the remaining drugs to appease Mikhalych, who is furious upon seeing them.

Mikhalych learns of the Hangman's murder and orders his bodyguard to summon "his" police officer, Stepan Voronov, to find the killer (Mikhalych doesn't yet know Voronov is the killer). Mikhalych orders Sergei and Simon to exchange a suitcase full of money for a suitcase with five kilograms of heroin with a lawyer, Borshchansky. On the way, they stop at a McDonald’s, where they meet their old friend, the bandit Boar, who tries to convince Sergei to go legit and advises him to think about moving to Moscow.

Stepan learned about Mikhalych's plan for the exchange from the piece of paper in the Hangman's pocket and hired Koron to intercept Sergei and Simon. Shortly after, Stepan also hires another bandit, a longtime enemy of his nicknamed "Brain", to eliminate Koron's gang after the job and deliver the money. Koron's gang ambushes Sergei and Simon after the exchange and take the suitcase from them, thinking that it is full of money. By the time Simon and Sergei come to Mikhalych, he orders them to find Stepan, discover where the drugs were taken, and then kill him. The duo arrive to Stepan's apartment and torture him. Stepan confesses that he was behind the ambush and tells them where to find Koron and the heroin, after which Simon kills Stepan. Together with Sergey, they conclude that he was the one who killed the Hangman.

Sergei and Simon go to Koron's apartment but only find Eggplant there, whom they tie up. Sergei searches for the heroin but finds a bag in the closet with guns and three balaclava masks, proving they're at the right place. Before Eggplant's associates return, Brain enters the apartment with his henchmen. Simon and Sergei kill them but leave Brain alive, whom they also tie up. He starts making completely inappropriate threats and swearing. Sergei gets tired of it and kills Brain with a shot to the temple, splattering the tied-up Eggplant with blood and brains. Right after Brain is killed, Koron and Bala return to the apartment and are held up at gunpoint by Sergei and Simon. Koron gives up the location of the heroin, and Sergei invites each of Koron's gang to play a round of Russian Roulette, which he calls "Zhmurki" ("blind man's buff"). Koron and Bala both die playing.

Meanwhile, the wounded Eggplant has freed himself from the ropes and has gotten a hold of a gun. He shoots Sergei, wounding him in the stomach, and is then killed by Simon. As Sergei lies bleeding on the couch, Simon calls a friend, a punk named Leshik, who is a medical student. After Leshik extracts the bullet from Sergei, the duo left the apartment. Sitting in the car, they recall their conversation with Boar, and decide to flee to Moscow and stop working for Mikhalych. They take the heroin with them, using it as their "start-up capital".

The film then flashes forward to 2005. Sergei is now a State Duma deputy, and Simon is his assistant. Together, they own a securities trading business. Mikhalych now works for them as a security guard, and his son Vladik works for the duo as an errand boy. Simon states that living in today's Russia, compared to the 1990s, has become more difficult.

== Cast ==
- Aleksei Panin as Sergei, bandit (voiced by Yuri Galtsev)
- Dmitriy Dyuzhev as Simon, bandit
- Nikita Mikhalkov as Sergei Mikhailovich, crime boss
- Sergey Makovetskiy as Koron, crime boss
- Viktor Sukhorukov as Stepan Voronov, corrupted police officer
- Anatoly Zhuravlyov as Bala, Koron's henchman
- Grigory Siyatvinda as Eggplant, Koron's henchman
- Aleksei Serebryakov as Doctor, drug dealer
- Garik Sukachov as Brain, crime boss
- Andrey Panin as the architect
- Kirill Pirogov as Hangman, bandit
- Yuri Stepanov as Boar, bandit
- Renata Litvinova as Katya, waitress
- Zhanna Bolotova as the university professor
- Dmitry Pevtsov as Viktor Borschansky, lawyer
- Tatyana Dogileva as Galya, Borschansky's secretary
- Andrey Krasko as the neighbour disturbed by loud music
- Aleksandr Bashirov as the man tied to the chair
- Andrey Merzlikin as Sergei Mikhailovich's bodyguard
- Viktor Bychkov as the zoo visitor
- Sergey Glazunov as Leshik, med student (voiced by Aleksei Panin)
- Vladislav Tolochko as Vladik, Sergei Mikhailovich's son
- Yevgeny Kosyrev as grown-up Vladik

== Production ==
Approximately 50 liters of fake blood were used in the film. With the exception of a few scenes in Moscow, the film was shot in Tver, the city formerly known as Kalinin, and Nizhny Novgorod, the city known as Gorky in Soviet times.

== Reception ==
This film is a first attempt at a comedic movie by Balabanov. The movie serves as a dark humor farce on typical gangster movies that were prevalent within Russian society in the 1990s. The movie received mixed reviews, with some critics writing disparaging reviews stating that the plot left much to be desired and most of the jokes fell flat, while others argued that the movie was a successful attempt by Balabanov to add a new movie genre to his repertoire.

== Literature ==
- Florian Weinhold (2013), Path of Blood: The Post-Soviet Gangster, His Mistress and Their Others in Aleksei Balabanov's Genre Films, Reaverlands Books: North Charleston, SC: pp. 115–138.
