= Kontora Kooka =

Russian rock music group

Kontora Kooka (Контора Кука)
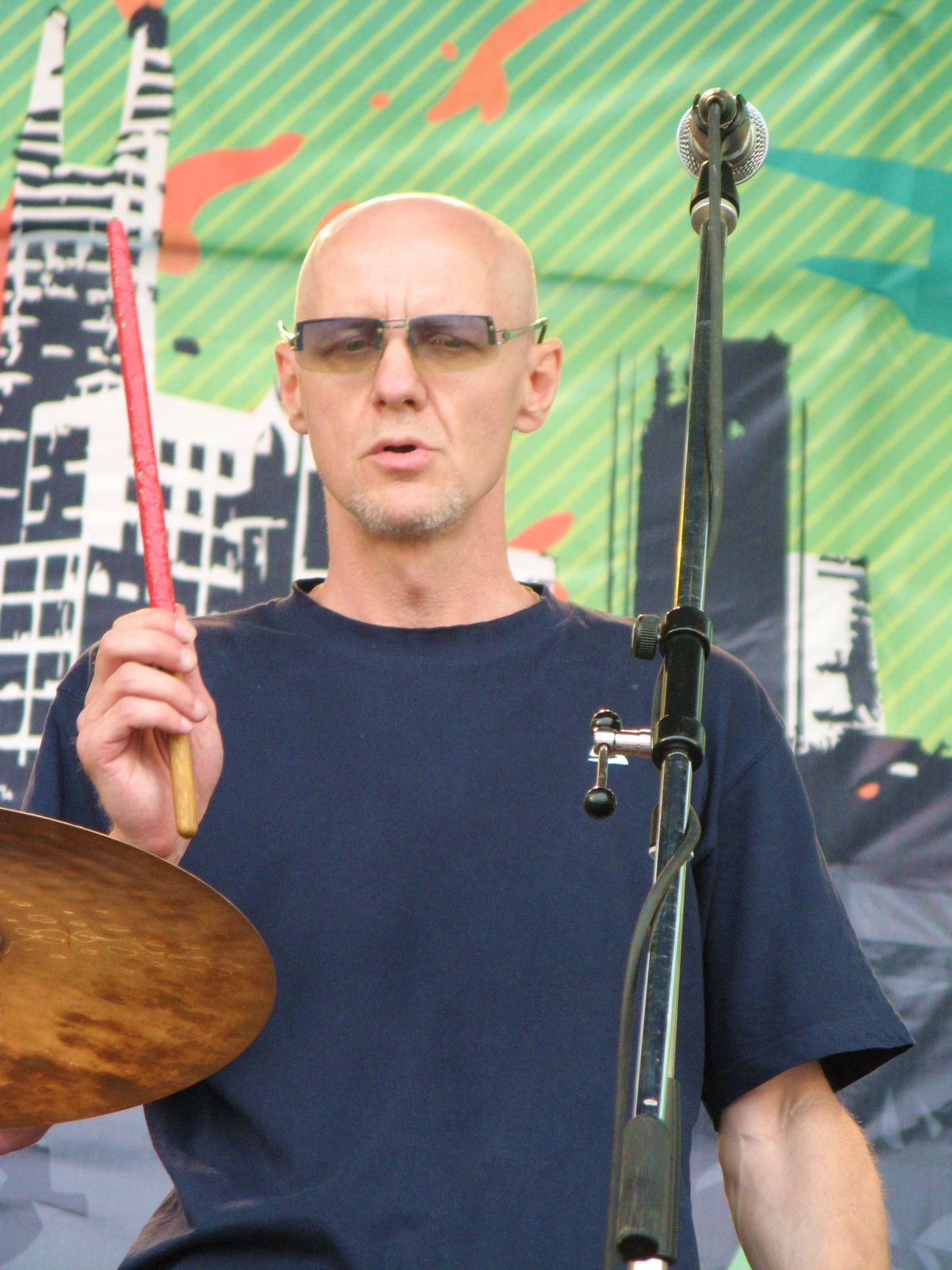
- Vladimir 'Kook' Elizarov

Background information
- Origin: Russia
- Genres: psychedelic rock, new wave, experimental rock, noise, industrial
- Years active: 1990–present
- Labels: Geometry
- Members: Vladimir 'Kook' Elizarov; Victor Gurov; Danila Telegin
- Past members: Vadim 'Joy' Bistrov; Timur Taziev; Alexey Karpov; Andrey Berezovsky
- Website: https://kontorakooka.bandcamp.com

Kontora Kooka or Kontora Kuka (Russian: Контора Кука) is a Russian rock music group formed in Samara in the early 1990s. According to Rolling Stone Russia, their album Check was the best Russian album of 2013.

== Band history ==
The band has three members. Vladimir 'Kook' Elizarov is the band's ideologist, as well as a vocalist, guitarist, percussionist, and lyricist. Danila Telegin, a guitarist and singer, is the second member. The third member of the group, Viktor Gurov, is responsible for programming drum machines, noises, keyboard, and other electronic musical instruments.

In 2000, their first album was released under the title Kontora Kooka (Контора Кука). The band's second album, Renovation, was released in 2004 by the Geometry music label. Critics compared Kontora Kooka's music to The Residents and other little-known post-rock bands. In 2006, the band recorded an industrial album named Ordnung (Орднунг), which was influenced by Einstürzende Neubauten.

The album Jazz Virus (Вирус Джаза) was released in the spring of 2012. That same year, the cover of the album won the Red Dot design award.

In early 2013, Danila Telegin left the group to start his own project, TLGN. The album CHECK (ЧЕК) was recorded in that year. After a long break, Oleg Sadovnikov returned to the group. According to Andrey Bukharin of Rolling Stone Russia, CHECK was one of the top ten albums and the best Russian album of 2013.

Middle Volga (Средняя Волга) was released in 2014.

On November 24, 2015, the album RIO (РИО) was released. Valeria Pikalova, the leader of Synesthesia, who previously collaborated with teams such as Adora VEGA and Purple Fog Side, took part in the recording of the album. Union Concern (Концерн Союз) named Rio one of the top twenty domestic albums of 2016.

Just one year later, on 29 November 2016, the band released the album Karachun. RuTracker.org selected the title track for their annual collection of the best tracks of 2016. The song "Baba-Lebeda" from the album got a spot on the annual compilation "ArtSovet Rutracker.org 2016 Essentials Titanium Block".

Kontora Kooka released the album Mein lieber friend (German: Mein lieber freund)) on September 19, 2017. Album featured by Aleksey Mogilevsky (ex-Nautilus Pompilius, Sax). Union Concern (Концерн Союз) named it the best album of the year and web portal NNeFormat (Наш Неформат) ranked it one of the top ten albums of the year.

== Discography ==
=== Studio albums ===
Title (Transliterated)	Title (Russian)	Title (English)	Release date
Kontora Kuka	Контора Кука	Cook's Office	2000
Renovatsiya	Реновация	Renovation	2004
LO-END	LO-END	LO-END	2009
Virus Dzaza	Вирус Джаза	Jazz Virus	2011
CHECK	ЧЕК	CHECK	2013
Srednyaya Volga	Средняя Волга	Middle Volga	2014
RIO	РИО	RIO	2015
Karachun	Карачун	Karachun	2016
Mein lieber friend	Mein lieber friend	Mein lieber friend	2017
WOO-EEE....	ЙЯ-ЁЁЁ....	WOO-EEE....	2019
Forst Zinna	Форст-Цинна	Forst Zinna	2019
Black Russian Woman	Black Russian Woman	Black Russian Woman	2021
