= Brother 2 =

2000 Russian crime film

Brother 2 Брат 2
- Russian theatrical release poster
- Directed by: Aleksei Balabanov
- Written by: Aleksei Balabanov
- Produced by: Sergei Selyanov
- Starring: Sergei Bodrov Jr. Viktor Sukhorukov; Sergei Makovetsky
- Distributed by: CTB Film Company
- Release date: August 12, 2000
- Running time: 123 min.
- Countries: Russia; United States
- Languages: Russian; English; Ukrainian
- Budget: $1.5 million
- Box office: $1.08 million

Brother 2 (Russian: Брат 2, romanized: Brat 2) is a 2000 Russian crime film written and directed by Aleksei Balabanov and starring Sergei Bodrov Jr. It is a direct sequel to the 1997 film Brother. The film is set in Moscow and Chicago.

Brother 2 received mostly positive reviews from critics, praising the acting, plot, setting, and soundtrack. The film is considered an integral part of Russian culture and has had a strong influence on the development of Russian cinema.

== Plot ==
The film opens in Moscow with Danila Bagrov and two of his friends from the army, Ilya Setevoy and Kostya Gromov, being interviewed on TV about their service in the First Chechen War.

After the interview, Kostya reveals that his twin brother, Dmitry, is an ice hockey player for the National Hockey League's Chicago Blackhawks and is being extorted by American kingpin Richard Mennis. Mennis has come to Moscow to discuss a proposal with the head of the bank Kostya works for, Valentin Belkin. Meanwhile, Danila's brother Viktor, who has moved to live with their mother, goes to Moscow to meet Danila.

The next morning, Kostya pleads Belkin to talk to Mennis about Dmitry. Belkin instructs his assistants to "deal with" Kostya so that he does not interfere, and they kill Kostya. That evening, Danila stops by Kostya's apartment to discover him shot dead and decides to help his twin brother.

On the black market, they purchase a CD with personal information about Belkin and buy World War II-era submachine gun and grenades. Meanwhile, Viktor has arrived in Moscow and manages to find Danila. He agrees to go to America with Danila and helps them steal a car.

Danila and Viktor find Belkin at an elite gymnasium where Belkin's son studies. Danila pulls Belkin aside to a private office and interrogates him at gunpoint, but Belkin completely shifts the blame onto Mennis. He discloses that Mennis is involved in drug trafficking and pornography. Danila spares Belkin.

Later, Belkin warns Mennis, telling him about the incident with Danila, and sends him a photo. Danila and his brother secretly obtain foreign passports with visas. To avoid capture, the brothers fly to America separately, and Viktor arrives in Chicago without any suspicion. Danila instead flies to New York City where he buys a cheap car to travel to Chicago by road, but it breaks down just outside Pennsylvania. Stranded, he hitches a ride to Chicago with trucker Ben Johnson (Ray Toler). Danila arrives in Chicago without a car, without a weapon and almost without money. There, he meets a Russian prostitute, Dasha, nicknamed Marilyn.

Back in Moscow, Belkin is still determined to catch Danila. Learning that Viktor was on board the flight to Chicago, he alerts the Ukrainian mafia there to find him. Meanwhile, Viktor arrives to the Ukrainian Village of Chicago and quickly begins to spend his money on entertainment. Danila is unable to contact Dmitry and Victor. Wanting to talk to Dasha, he goes to the neighborhood where she works, but ends up detained by the police after getting into a fight with the pimp's men.

Having found Dmitry, Danila finds out the address of Mennis's office. Contacting Dasha, Danila arranges a meeting with a local arms dealer. Using a homemade gun, he wounds the dealer in the face and steals a weapon. Then, in Dasha's apartment, he kills her pimp and the bandits accompanying him, who came to avenge the dealer. After this, Danila and Dasha finally meet Victor; sitting by the fire, the three discuss life - Dasha reluctantly recalls being stranded for years after coming on a student visa; Victor, on the contrary, admires America.

The next day, Danila first hits Mennis's front, a local club. The frightened director of the club gives Danila all Mennis' money and location. Viktor picked up a tail by the Ukrainian mafia, draws them away and kills their hitman, but not before learning of the mafia's headquarters.

The next morning, Danila reaches Mennis's office and confronts him. Danila returns the money he took to Dmitry. Danila tells Dmitry that he is very similar to his brother.

Danila and Dasha take a taxi to the airport, but the car stops at a police line in the Ukrainian Village; one of the onlookers says that a certain Russian came to a Ukrainian restaurant and shot the local mafia. The police storm the building and drag Viktor out, and he shouts that he will stay in America. Danila calls Ben; he takes them to the airport in a limousine disguised as first-class passengers. They manage to quickly go through the procedures and board a plane to Moscow.

== Cast ==
Actor	Role
Sergei Bodrov Jr. (1971-2002)	as Danila Bagrov
Viktor Sukhorukov (1951)	as Viktor Bagrov (voiced by Aleksei Poluyan)
Kirill Pirogov (1973)	as Ilya Setevoy
Alexander Dyachenko (1965)	as Konstantin Gromov / Dmitry Gromov
Sergei Makovetsky (1958)	as Valentin Edgarovich Belkin
Irina Saltykova (1966)	as herself
Gary Houston	as Richard Mennis
Ray Toler (1949)	as Ben Johnson
Darya Jurgens (1968)	as Dasha / Marilyn, the prostitute (voiced by Natalya Danilova)
Lisa Jeffrey	as herself
Aleksandr Karamnov (1963)	as Boris
Bradley Mott (1956-2020)	as Fat man
E. Milton Wheeler (1959)	as Pimp
Tatiana Zakharova	as Danila and Viktor's mother (voiced by Nina Usatova)
Roman Tokar	as New York taxi driver (voiced by Yuri Stoyanov)
Darius Kasparaitis	as himself (cameo)
Alexei Morozov	as himself (cameo)
Andrei Nikolishin	as himself (cameo)
Jaromír Jágr	as himself (cameo)
Valdis Pelšs	as himself (cameo)
Leonid Yakubovich	as himself (cameo)

== Production ==
=== Filming ===
The scenes in the United States were partially filmed in Chicago's Ukrainian Village.

Belkin's car is a black Austrian Steyr 220 convertible from 1938. The blue Cadillac Coupe de Ville that Danila buys in the film was purchased by the film crew in New York for $1,000. The truck that Ben drives is a classic Peterbilt 379. During filming, the heavy truck was driven by actor Ray Toler himself, who later recalled this as the hardest role in his life.

Before filming Danila's fight in the Chicago ghetto, Balabanov asked the two black actors to hit Bodrov harder so that everything would look natural. By accident, the actors broke two of Bodrov's ribs.

In November 2017, Colta.ru published a long interview with Svetlana Bodrova, the widow of Sergei. According to her, television journalist and former colleague of Bodrov, Alexander Lyubimov, almost disrupted work on the film. Initially, the scene in which Bagrov comes with Ilya and Kostya to the Ostankino television center and then gives an interview was supposed to be filmed in the studio of the Vzglyad program. According to the script, Lyubimov was supposed to appear in it as a presenter, playing himself. He promised to help the filmmakers organize filming, but then unexpectedly refused to participate in the project the day before and did not provide them with a studio. Ultimately, it was decided to film the scene in the studio of the V mire lyudey program of the TV-6 channel with Ivan Demidov starring as the presenter.

== Soundtrack ==
The film's soundtrack consists of popular songs from contemporary Russian and Ukrainian rock artists, such as Splean, Bi-2, Zemfira, Smyslovye Gallyutsinatsii, Chicherina, Okean Elzy and Nautilus Pompilius. The pop-star Irina Saltykova being one of the important characters, there are some of her songs in the soundtrack. The latter is partly a reference to the soundtrack of the original Brother, which consists entirely of Nautilus Pompilius' songs. The soundtrack includes "Lafayette" performed by American band Sleeping For Sunrise.

1. "Бай-Бай" (Bye-Bye) — Irina Saltykova (O. Molchanov, A. Slavorosov)
2. "Полковник" (Colonel) — Bi-2 (Shura Bi-2, Lyova Bi-2)
3. "Счастье" (Happiness) — Bi-2 (Shura Bi-2, Lyova Bi-2)
4. "Солнечный друг" (Sunny Friend) — Irina Saltykova (O. Molchanov, A. Slavorosov)
5. "Варвара" (Varvara) — Bi-2 (Shura Bi-2, Lyova Bi-2)
6. "Огоньки" (Twinkles) — Irina Saltykova (P. Andreev)
7. "Искала" (I Was Searching) — Zemfira (Zemfira Ramazanova)
8. "Ту Лу Ла" (Tu Lu La) — Chicherina (Yulia Chicherina)
9. "Гибралтар" (Gibraltar) — Vyacheslav Butusov (Vyacheslav Butusov, Dmitry Gunitsky)
10. "Дорога" (The Road) — AuktsYon (Leonid Fyodorov, Dmitry Ozeretsky)
11. "Кавачай" (Kavachay) — Okean Elzy (Svyatoslav Vakarchuk, Pavlo Hudimov)
12. "Вечно молодой" (Forever Young) — Smyslovyie gallyutsinatsii (Sergey Bobunets, Oleg Genenfeld)
13. "Коли тебе нема" (When You Are Out) — Okean Elzy (Svyatoslav Vakarchuk)
14. "Розовые очки" (Pink Glasses) — Smyslovye gallyutsinatsii (Sergey Bobunets, Oleg Genenfeld)
15. "Линия жизни" (Life Line) — Splean (Aleksandr Vasilyev)
16. "Секрет" (The Secret) — Agata Kristi (Gleb Samoylov)
17. "Никогда" (Never) — Vadim Samoylov (Vadim Samoylov)
18. "Город" (The City) — Tantsy minus (Vyacheslav Petkun)
19. "Катманду" (Kathmandu) — Krematoriy (Armen Grigoryan)
20. "Иду" (I Am Going) — Tantsy minus (Vyacheslav Petkun)
21. "Земля" (Earth) — Masha i medvedi (Denis Petukhov, Maria Makarova)
22. "Lafayette" — Sleeping for Sunrise (Blake J. Zweig, James Konczyk, Jay Ranz)
23. "Погляд" (The Sight) — La-Mansh (Dmytro Tsyperdiuk)
24. "Прощальное письмо" (Farewell Letter) — Nautilus Pompilius and Children's Choir led by M. I. Slavkin (Vyacheslav Butusov, Dmitry Umetsky)
25. "Стюардесса Жанна" (Jeanne The Stewardess) — The Metropol Restaurant Orchestra (Vladimir Presnyakov Jr., Ilya Reznik, Aleksandr Starobinets)

== Reception ==
=== Critical response ===
Mikhail Brashinsky wrote: "The appearance of any sequel is a sign of a healthy film culture [...] Two major risks have left Brother. The living environment is gone—the Petersburg dead-end streets, the Sennoy Market—the precisely guessed texture of the new era. One story remains: honest, straightforward, and unoriginal, just like its hero. The 'immorality' is gone, the whole appeal of the first Brother, which paradoxically combined Komsomol sincerity with killer-style zombification. What remains is spirituality: Orthodox values, 'Strength is not in money, but in truth'; violence not because it is easy, like brushing your teeth, but because there is injustice in the world and it must be fought [...] The film is solid, it is not boring to watch. Aleksei Balabanov films in the only way one should film: as though we actually lived in a healthy country that produced 150 films a year. Although of course, that is not the case, and around him there is an empty field, and on it—almost a savior's cross planted in it. The proper response to Brother 2 should therefore be an adequate one: no hysteria, calmly, as to a normal film, of which there ought to be many."

The film critic Yury Gladilshchikov, writing for the magazine Itogi, stated: "Our answer to James Bond and other 'anti-Soviet cinema' [...] Brother 2 was ideological [...] playing to the fears of its national audience [...] the first manifestation of Russia's new snobbery towards the US [...] Its central character was a) cute and b) clever [...] war creates a special kind of childish killers [...] The search for national identity [...] only leads to unwarranted xenophobia."

=== Censorship ===
In 2015, the Ukrainian State Film Agency banned Brother 2 from being shown in the country because, according to agency experts, the film contains scenes "that are humiliating for Ukrainians on a national basis, as well as due to the incorrectness of showing this film during the aggression in the east of the country."

== Possible sequel ==
After the release of Brother 2, Balabanov said in an interview that he refused to film a third film, believing that the story of Danila Bagrov had outlived its usefulness, and it was necessary to move in a new direction. Bodrov later took up directing and was not interested in reprising the role. However, he did not completely rule out the possibility.

Yet later on he hinted at a possible third part while answering a comment on the official Brother website which suggested to "send Danila to the Second Chechen War and kill him". Apparently in 2002 he released War where Bodrov played a supporting role of Captain Medvedev.

In 2001, Bodrov directed a criminal drama entitled Sisters which was compared by critics to Balabanov's dilogy. Bodrov himself appeared in an episodic role of a nameless New Russian — according to Bodrov himself, a cameo of his Bagrov character.

In 2014, Viktor Sukhorukov announced his desire to make Brother 3 and dedicate it to the memory of Balabanov and Bodrov. He said that he had long planned the sequel and was full of ideas for the new story which had been rejected by Balabanov during his lifetime, including Viktor being broken out of an American prison by Mexicans and returning to St. Petersburg in an oil trawler.

In 2019, it was reported in Russian media that musician and showman Stanislav Baretsky was planning to shoot Brother 3 with a completely new crew and cast, including ex-prisoners. This caused a negative reaction from fans, Bodrov's relatives, Viktor Sukhorukov, Irina Saltykova, and CTB producer Sergei Selyanov who stated that his company would never give film rights to Baretsky and that they might sue Baretsky at one point.

In 2021, Valery Pereverzev began filming Brother 3. Despite the name, it is not related with Balabanov's films. In June 2022, Pereverzev said that Baretsky's idea turned out to be a "dastardly fake" that got out of control, which confused many about who was making the film. In response, in November 2023, Baretsky criticized Pereverzev's film idea, saying that it was impossible to film the third part of the brother without the participation of Bodrov. At the same time, Baretsky noted that he further plans to film Zhmurki 2, and did not further mention his idea for Brother 3.

== Legacy ==
Since its release in 2000, Brother 2 has developed a cult following among Russian-speaking audiences and has been embraced by elements of the extreme right in Russia.

The video game Cyberpunk 2077 contains direct references to the film; namely, Bagrov's monologue in Mennis's office.

== Literature ==
- Florian Weinhold (2013), Path of Blood: The Post-Soviet Gangster, His Mistress and Their Others in Aleksei Balabanov's Genre Films, Reaverlands Books: North Charleston, SC: pp. 66–90.
- Susan Larsen (2003), "National Identity, Cultural Authority, and the Post-Soviet Blockbuster: Nikita Mikhalkov and Aleksei Balabanov." Slavic Review, vol. 62, No. 3, pp. 491–511.
