= Dmitry Umetsky =

Russian composer

Dmitry Konstantinovich Umetsky (Russian: Дми́трий Константи́нович Уме́цкий, born on 31 August 1961 in Sverdlovsk) is a Soviet and Russian rock musician and songwriter.

Together with Vyacheslav Butusov, he founded the band Nautilus Pompilius, in which Umetsky mainly participated as a bassist. He was also an occasional co-author of the music or lyrics, backing vocalist, producer, and administrator of the band.
