= Cargo 200 (film) =

- Directed by: Aleksei Balabanov
- Written by: Aleksei Balabanov
- Produced by: Sergei Selyanov
- Starring: Agniya Kuznetsova; Leonid Bichevin; Aleksei Poluyan; Leonid Gromov; Aleksei Serebryakov
- Production company: Kinokompaniya CTB
- Release dates: 16 May 2007 (Cannes); 14 June 2007 (Russia)
- Running time: 89 minutes
- Country: Russia
- Languages: Russian; English
- Box office: RUB 3,553,428 (Russia)

Cargo 200 (Russian: Груз 200, romanized: Gruz 200) is a 2007 Russian psychological thriller film directed by Aleksei Balabanov depicting the end of the Soviet era. The action is set during the culmination of the Soviet–Afghan War in 1984. The movie's title refers to the code "Cargo 200" under which dead Soviet soldiers' remains were shipped home. The movie arose from a combination of different true events. It received generally positive reviews from critics.

== Plot ==
Artyom Kazakov (Leonid Gromov), a professor of Marxist-Leninist atheism at the Leningrad State University, is visiting his brother, Colonel Mikhail Kazakov (Yuri Stepanov), in a small town of Nizhny Volok in the fictitious Leninsk Oblast. He meets his niece Liza's new boyfriend Valery Buadze (Leonid Bichevin), who works as a fartsovshchik; Valery and Liza are going to have a party at the dacha of Liza's classmate, Anzhelika Naboyeva (Agniya Kuznetsova), who is the daughter of the district secretary of the Communist Party. After staying at Mikhail’s place, Artyom sets off to Leninsk to visit his mother. On his way to Leninsk, Artyom's car breaks down near the village of Kalyayevo, and he is forced to go to an isolated farmhouse by the road to try to get help. In the house, he meets a local moonshiner Alexey (Aleksei Serebryakov), Alexey's wife Antonina (Natalya Akimova), a Vietnamese migrant worker who goes by the name "Sunka" (Mikhail Skryabin), and a stranger who is not introduced at the time. Artyom and Alexey drink much alcohol and argue about faith in God and retribution for sins, with Artyom advocating for the Marxist-Leninist atheist worldview and Alexey defending the ideas of Tommaso Campanella. Sunka, who is practically a personal slave of Alexey, fixes Artyom's car and the professor drives on. However, realizing how drunk he is, Artyom decides to go back to Nizhny Volok to spend the night at Mikhail's apartment.

In the meantime, Valery offers Liza to go to a discotheque instead of going to Anzhelika’s dacha, but the latter refuses. Having gone to the discotheque by himself, Valery encounters Anzhelika. They get drunk together, and after the party is over Valery drives with her to Alexey’s house to get more alcohol.

Valery tells Anzhelika to stay in the car while he gets the alcohol, promising to return promptly; however, instead of coming back to the car, he gets drunk senseless with Alexey. Anzhelika, waiting in the car, notices that she is being watched by a stranger — the same unnamed man that Artyom met earlier. She gets scared, and tries to get help from the moonshiner's wife Antonina; the latter hands the girl a shotgun and locks her in a banya. The stranger forces Sunka to unlock the banya, introduces himself as a militsiya officer Captain Zhurov (Aleksei Poluyan), and takes away the shotgun from Anzhelika. When Sunka tries to defend the girl, captain Zhurov shoots him dead and rapes Anzhelika with a glass bottle (it is implied that he himself is impotent).

In the morning, Zhurov takes distressed Anzhelika hostage, puts her in on his police motorcycle and takes her to his apartment in Leninsk where he lives with his deranged alcoholic mother; on their way, he stops to call the local police department to report that a man (Sunka) has been murdered in Kalyayevo. In his apartment, Zhurov handcuffs Anzhelika to his bed and places her under the supervision of his demented mother, who spends her days watching estrada performances on TV and believes that the girl is Zhurov’s unrequited love interest. Anzhelika threatens that her father, who is a high-ranking official of the party, and her fiancé Nikolay Gorbunov, who is an army paratrooper, will save her, to which Zhurov seems indifferent. He later finds out that Anzhelika’s fiancé had just been killed in the Soviet-Afghan War and that his coffin is set to arrive in Nizhny Volok among the bodies of other paratroopers (colloquially referred to as Cargo 200). Zhurov arranges to have the coffin shipped to his apartment, where he opens it and throws the corpse on the bed next to Anzhelika, causing her great distress. The captain later brings in several detainees to gang-rape Anzhelika, while he himself sits and watches; when he thinks that one of the inmates (Aleksandr Bashirov) “fails to please” Anzhelika, he shoots him and leaves him on the bed next to Nikolay’s corpse.

Having noticed Zhurov take Anzhelika, Valery hastily leaves Alexey’s house, leaving the hungover moonshiner alone. Later in the day, police officers arrive at Alexey’s house and arrest him for the alleged murder of his worker Sunka. Captain Zhurov visits Alexey in his cell and convinces him to take the blame for the crime in return for some unexplained earlier favors. While in jail, Alexey gets a visit from his wife Antonina and tells her not to worry. Antonina meets Artyom, whose testimony might exonerate her husband, but Artyom refuses to testify since his involvement in the case would jeopardize his academic career. Alexey is subsequently convicted, sentenced to capital punishment, and summarily executed. Furious at Zhurov for setting up her husband, Antonina takes the shotgun and goes to Zhurov's apartment, where she encounters Anzhelika still chained to the bed next to the rotting corpses and the captain reading Nikolay’s stolen letters to her. Antonina fatally shoots Zhurov, closes the door and walks out without attempting to help the girl despite her pleas.

Overwhelmed by guilt for letting Alexey get executed, Artyom enters a church and asks to be baptized. In the last scenes Valery, who managed to keep a low profile through the entire affair, is shown discussing business propositions with Artyom's son, Slava at a Kino concert. The two are excited about the amount of money that can be made in the disintegrating country.

== Filming ==
Filming was carried out in Cherepovets, Novaya Ladoga, Staraya Ladoga, Vyborg, and Pskov.

== Soundtrack ==
- «Ariel» — In the land of magnolias (Russian: "В краю магнолий")
- «Zemlyane» — Grass by the Home
- «DK » — New turn (Russian: Новый поворот)
- «Kola Beldy» — I'll take you to the tundra (Russian: Увезу тебя я в тундру)
- «Afric Simone» — Hafanana
- «Pesniary» — Vologda (Russian: Вологда)
- «Kino» — There is time, but no money (Russian: Время есть, а денег нет) (a hint to the aphorism "time is money")
- «Yuri Loza» — Raft (Russian: Плот)

== Reception ==
=== Critical response ===
Cargo 200 has an approval rating of 81% on review aggregator website Rotten Tomatoes, based on 21 reviews, and an average rating of 6.75/10.

Wally Hammond from Time Out gave the film a mostly positive review, stating, "Whether this superbly-acted, finely-directed, vision of hell is intended as a despairing state-of-the-nation address or a shocking spiritual wake-up call is unclear; what is certain, it certainly provides this year's grizzliest cinematic ghost-ride".

Vadim Rizov from Village Voice gave the film a positive review, praising the film's direction, performances, and its ability to hold its tension throughout its running time, calling it, "an unflinching portrait of the grim vileness of Soviet Russia in 1984".

David Auerbach claims that the film is not a real story as claimed, but is based on William Faulkner's novel Sanctuary, which was set in Mississippi in 1929.

=== Awards and nominations ===
Won:

- 2007 - Gijón International Film Festival for Best Director (Aleksey Balabanov)
- 2008 - Rotterdam International Film Festival: KNF Award'(Aleksey Balabanov)

Nominated:

- 2007 - Gijón International Film Festival: Grand Prix Asturias (Aleksey Balabanov])
- 2007 - Sochi Open Russian Film Festival: Grand Prize of the Festival (Aleksey Balabanov)
- 2007 - Russian Guild of Film Critics Awards: Best Film
