= Vera Zelinskaya =

Russian film production designer (1944–2021)

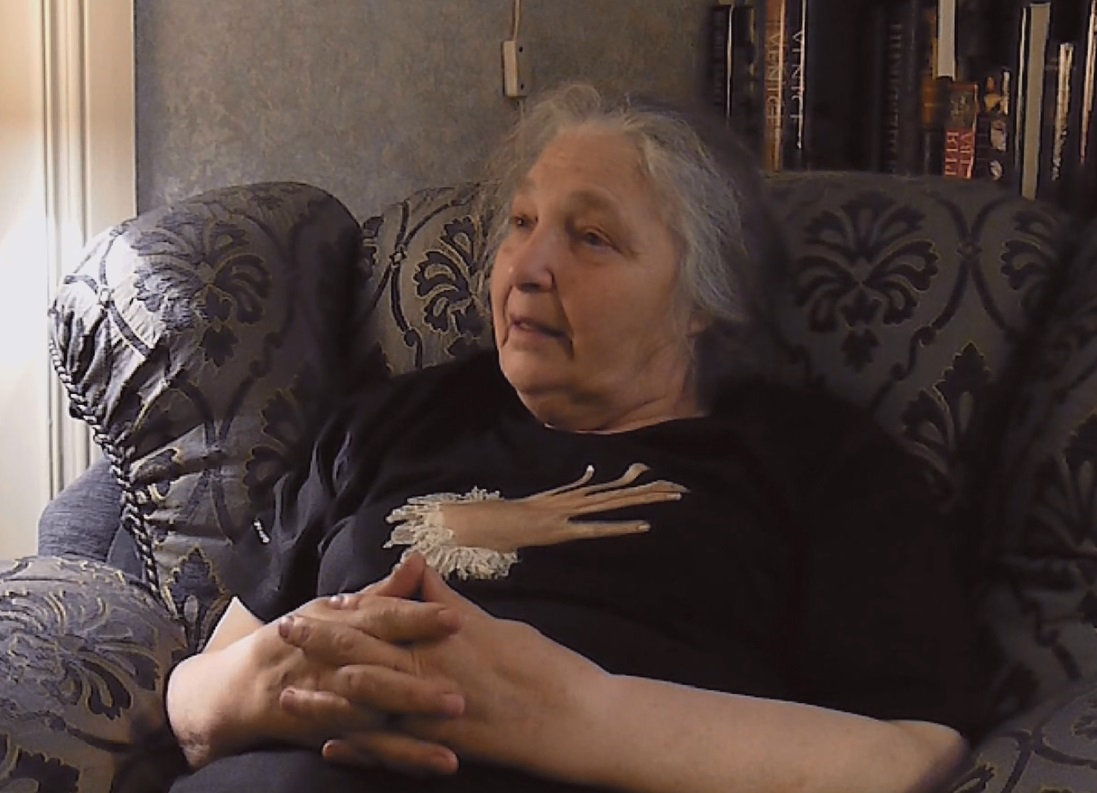
- Zelenskaya in June 2013
- Born: 'Vera Yevgenievna Zelinskaya; 26 August 1944; Novosibirsk, Soviet Union
- Died: 6 June 2021 (aged 76); Saint Petersburg, Russia
- Occupation: film production designer
- Years active: 1980—2011
- Awards: Nika Award (2018)
- Vera Zelinskaya's voice Recorded 27 June 2013

Vera Yevgenievna Zelinskaya (Russian: Вера Евгеньевна Зелинская; 26 August 1944 – 6 June 2021) was a Russian film production designer of among others Window to Paris, Time for Sorrow Hasn't Come Yet and Of Freaks and Men.

She won Best Art Direction at 1998 Russian Guild of Film Critics Awards for her work on Of Freaks and Men.

Zelinskaya died in Saint Petersburg on 6 June 2021, aged 74.
