= Aleksei Poluyan =

Russian actor

Aleksei Vladimirovich Poluyan (Russian: Алексей Владимирович Полуян; 1965–2010) was a Russian actor. His most famous role was that of the sadistic Captain Zhurov in Alexey Balabanov's horror movie Cargo 200. Poluyan died from alcohol abuse in 2010.

== Filmography ==
Year	Title	Role	Notes
1983	Patsany		
1984	Podslushannyy razgovor		
1988	Krik o pomoshchi		
1990	The Guard	Nikolai Mazur	
1991	Tretya planeta	Informator	
1991	Koltso		
1992	The Chekist	Pepel	
1992	Komediya strogogo rezhima		
1993	Zhizn s idiotom		
1993	Akt		
1995	Peculiarities of the National Hunt	Zaderzhannyy	
1997	Brother	Viktor Bagrov / Bandit	Voice, Uncredited
2000	Brother 2	Viktor Bagrov / Bandit / Okhrannik v shkole	Voice, Uncredited
2000	The Garden Was Full of Moon	Statuette seller	
2007	Cargo 200	Captain Zhurov	
2008	A Woman in Berlin	Pockennarbiger Unterleutnant	
2008	Once Upon a Time in the Provinces	Viktor Sergeevich	
2008	Chuzhie	Sapper commander	
2008	Morphine	Sosed-voennyy	
2009	I Am	Morgue truck driver	
2010	The Edge		(final film role)
