= Zoya (2020 film) =

- Official release poster
- Directed by: Maxim Brius; Leonid Plyaskin
- Screenplay by: Andrey Nazarov; Andrey Tumarkin
- Produced by: Yuliana Slashcheva; Aleksandr Barkov; Inessa Yurchenko; Sergei Shcheglov; Genrikh Ken; Andrey Tumarkin; Sergey Zernov; Aleksandr Barkov
- Starring: Anastasia Mishina; Artyom Kuren; Darya Jurgens; Yevgeny Romantsov; Nikita Kologrivyy; Wolfgang Cerny; Ruslan Chernetsky; Gennady Yakovlev; Anna Ukolova; Aleksandr Vontov
- Cinematography: Andrey Naydenov; Stanislav Mikhailov; Vladimir Shpomer
- Edited by: Vitaly Vinogradov
- Music by: Maksim Koshevarov; Aleksandr Maev
- Production companies: Gorky Film Studio; Triix Media
- Distributed by: KaroRental Film Distribution
- Release dates: December 13, 2020 (Window to Europe Film Festival); January 28, 2021 (Russia)
- Running time: 105 minutes
- Country: Russia
- Languages: Russian, German
- Budget: $1 million
- Box office: $750 000

Zoya (Russian: Зоя, other version of the title is The Passion of Zoya Russian: Страсти о Зое or Russian: Страсти по Зое) is a 2020 Russian biographical war film directed by Maxim Brius and Leonid Plyaskin. The film is based on the life of Zoya Kosmodemyanskaya.

The film premiered on December 13, 2020 at the XXVIII Russian Film Festival "Window to Europe" in the town of Vyborg, and the film was theatrically released in Russia on January 28, 2021, by KaroRental Film Distribution.

== Synopsis ==
On June 21, 1941, Zoya Kosmodemyanskaya dances at her graduation ball with her fiancé Zhenya and is planning to receive a higher education in literature. But the next morning war and widespread mobilization commences. Zhenya goes to the front and dies. Afterwards Zoya decides that she must also fight. In the fall of 1941, she becomes a reconnaissance fighter on the Western Front and a couple of days later she finds herself behind German lines. Then Joseph Stalin gives the order to destroy the lands occupied by the enemies, and Zoya is among those who can speak German well and is fearless enough to go into the very heart of the enemy army. After several successful forays, Zoya is captured and brutally tortured. When she is on the scaffold, she calls on the villagers not to be afraid of death and to kill the Nazis.

== Cast ==
- Anastasia Mishina as Zoya Kosmodemyanskaya
- Artyom Kuren as Aleksandr "Shura" Kosmodemyansky, Zoya's brother
- Darya Jurgens as Lyubov Kosmodemyanskaya, Zoya and Shura's mother
- Yevgeny Romantsov as Boris Kraynov
- Nikita Kologrivyy as Vasily Klubkov
- Wolfgang Cerny as Hauptmann Erich Sommer
- Ruslan Chernetsky as Major Arturs Sproģis
- Gennady Yakovlev as Matvey Tsvetkov, sabotage school instructor
- Anna Ukolova as Agrafena Smirnova
- Aleksandr Vontov as Stalin

=== Other cast ===
- Dmitry Bykovsky-Romashov as Semyon Sviridov
- Mikhail Grishchenko as Zhenya Vasiliev
- Evgeniya Kuznetsova as Vera Voloshina
- Polina Filonenko as Maria Sedova
- Karina Razumovskaya as Praskovya Kulik
- Sergey Yatsenyuk as Alexander Shelepin
- Olga Lapshina as Avdotya Voronina
- Sergey Gamov as Alexander Poskrebyshev, Stalin's personal secretary
- Yuri Utkin as Colonel Ludwig Rüderer
- Yevgeny Sannikov as Chief Lieutenant Mark Rattenwy
- Jean-Marc Birkholz as Commandant Dirk Sonenstrahl
- Mindaugas Papinigis as Karl Beyerlein
- Anastasiya Tyunina as Anya
- Mikhail Arefyev as Ivan Kiryukhin
- Vladimir Petrov as Fyodor Kuzmichev
- Elena Shabad-Ozerova as Fedosya Solina

== Production ==
=== Development ===
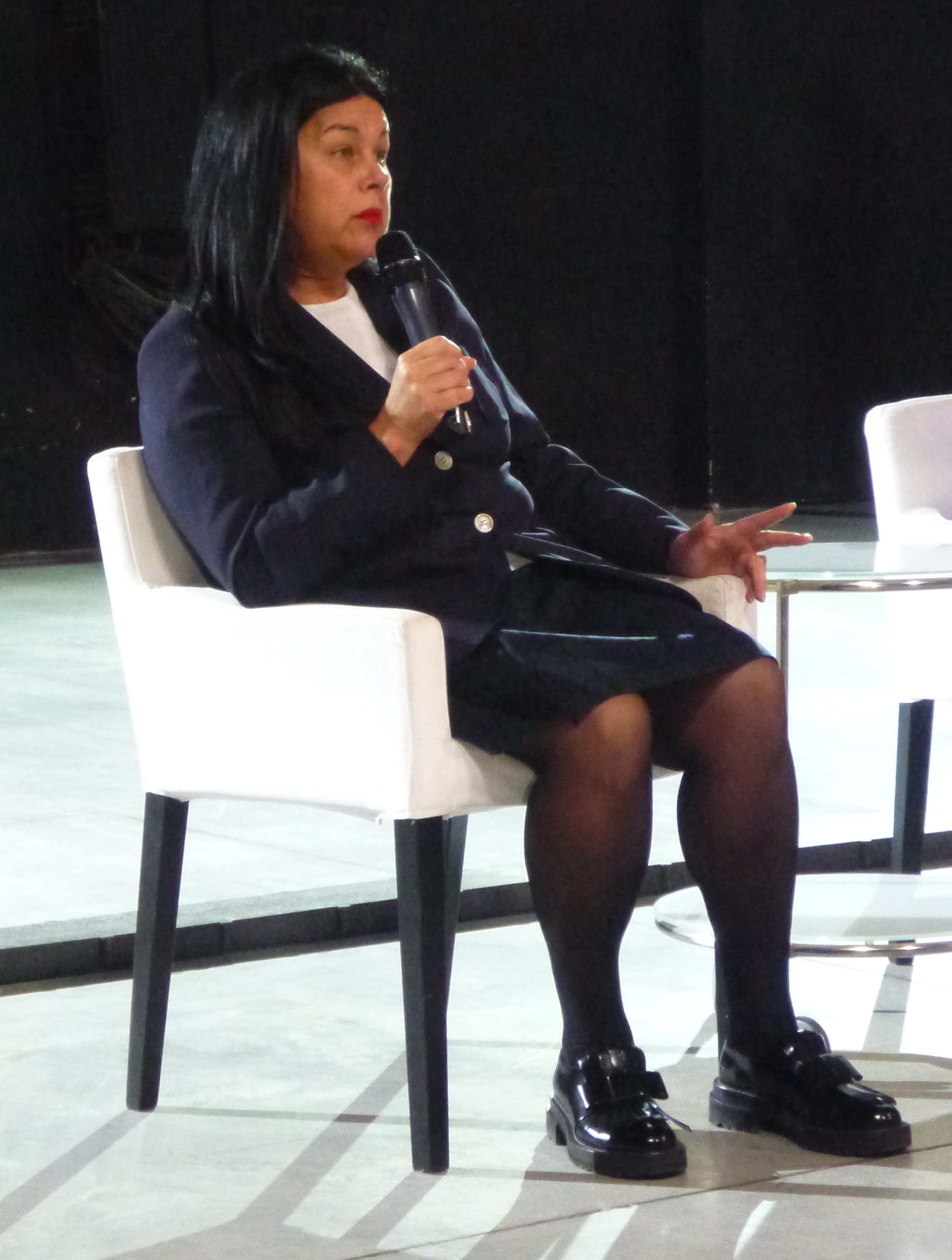
Producer Inessa Yurchenko ("Triix Media") presents the film Zoya in Yekaterinburg on May 7, 2021.

The idea of making a feature film about Zoya Kosmodemyanskaya was first voiced on November 27, 2016 by Russian Minister of Culture Vladimir Medinsky. He also suggested the tentative title of the future film - “The Passion of Zoya”. The initiator for the creation of the film was the Russian Military Historical Society (RVIO). On December 9, 2016, on the Day of Heroes of the Fatherland, it announced the first stage of the competition for creating a script.

Work on the project began in 2017: Egor Konchalovsky was chosen to direct, the script was written by Elizaveta Trusevich. At the same time, it was emphasized that the plot was built exclusively on documents and eyewitness accounts; there was no unreliable information, including various kinds of “war myths".

The film is based on a script written by Andrei Nazarov and Leonid Plyaskin. Plyaskin became the director, and Maxim Brius later joined him. The production was carried out by the Gorky Film Studio (Moscow) with the participation of the Russian Military Historical Society (RVIO) and with the financial support of the Ministry of Culture of the Russian Federation, which allocated 60 million rubles for the creation of the film. A collection of donations for the same purposes was opened on the RVIO website, and in total about 600 thousand rubles were collected.

=== Casting ===
Actor Wolfgang Cerny who played Hauptmann Erich Sommer, initially refused the role since he did not wish to play a sadist. The part ended up being rewritten, with Sommer not being one of the torturers and instead seeing a like-minded spirit in Zoya and tries to save her.

=== Filming ===
The first filming days of the film took place from February 10 to 13, 2019 in Belarus. Part of the filming took place in the village of Zabrodye, Vileika district, Minsk region, where with great difficulty it was possible to find village buildings preserved from the pre-war years. On April 19, 2019, filming ended. Initially, the film's release was planned to coincide with the 75th anniversary of the victory in the war (May 9, 2020), but due to the COVID-19 pandemic it had to be postponed.

== Release ==
=== Theatrical ===
Zoya became the closing film of the XXVIII Russian Film Festival “Window to Europe” (December 7–13, 2020) in Vyborg. The premiere screening took place on December 13, 2020 at the Vyborg Palace cinema.

The film was released in the Russian Federation on January 28, 2021. The distributor of the film was KaroRental.

== Reception ==
The film received mostly negative reviews from various outlets, including by Kommersant, Literaturnaya Gazeta, Nezavisimaya Gazeta, Kino Mail.ru. InterMedia published a positive review. Among the common criticisms noted were the numerous historical inaccuracies in the film.
