= Viktor Sukhorukov =

Russian actor (born 1951)

- Виктор Сухоруков
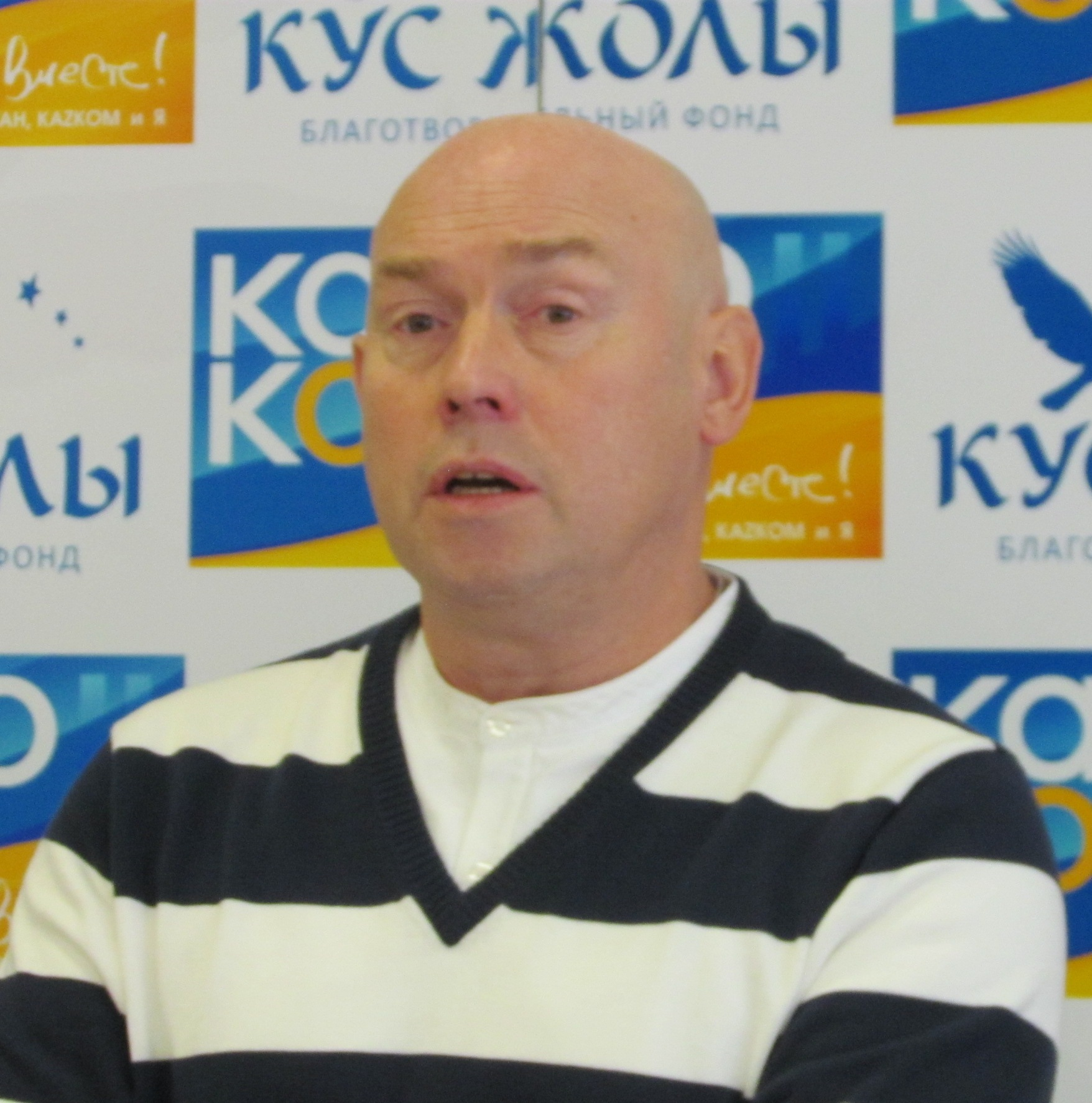
- Sukhorukov in 2011
- Born: 10 November 1951 (age 74); Orekhovo-Zuyevo, Moscow Oblast, Russian SFSR, Soviet Union
- Occupation: Actor
- Years active: 1973–present

Viktor Ivanovich Sukhorukov (Russian: Виктор Иванович Сухоруков; born 10 November 1951) is a Soviet and Russian stage and film actor. He has appeared in more than 50 films and television shows since 1974. He starred in Happy Days (1991), which was screened in the Un Certain Regard section at the 1992 Cannes Film Festival. Sukhorukov is most known for his role as Viktor Bagrov in the films Brother and Brother 2.

== Filmography ==
=== Live action ===
- Black and White Magic (1983) – Kukhtin, Seva's father
- Gunpowder (1985) – episode
- Presumption of Innocence (1988) – conductor from the next car
- Sideburns (1990) – Viktor
- Happy Days (1991) – He
- The Castle (1994) – Jeremiah, Zemlemer's assistant
- The Year of the Dog (1994) – bra seller
- Operation Happy New Year (1996) – first killer
- Brother (1997) – Viktor Bagrov (voiced by Aleksei Poluyan)
- All My Lenins (1997) – Vladimir Lenin / Ivan
- Of Freaks and Men (1998) – Viktor Ivanovich, Johann's assistant
- Brother 2 (2000) – Viktor Bagrov (voiced by Aleksei Poluyan)
- Antikiller (2002) – Aleksandr "Ambal" Somov, chief of outlaw gang
- Theatrical Novel (2002) – Filipp Tulumbasov
- Poor Poor Paul (2003) – Emperor Paul I of Russia
- Goddess: How I fell in Love (2004) – Viktor Iliazarovich, father of the missing child
- Graveyard Shift (2005) – day salesman
- The Star of the Era (2005) – Nikita Khrushchev
- Dead Man's Bluff (2005) – Stepan Voronov, senior lieutenant of militsiya
- Satisfaction (2006) – Alexander von Benckendorff
- Pushkin: The Last Duel (2006) – Aleksandr Petrovich Galakhov, colonel
- The Island (2006) – father Philaret
- Kitty (2009) – Seryozha
- Hamlet. XXI Century (2009) – Ozrik
- In the Style of Jazz (2010) – Viktor Ivanovich, director
- Silent Souls (2010) – Vsevolod Sergeyev, Aist's father
- Orlean (2015) – Pavlyuchek, executor
- Paradise (2016) – Heinrich Himmler
- Fizruk (2017) – Ernest Petrovich Shilovsky
- Godunov (2018) – Malyuta Skuratov
- Fire (2020) – Okopych, helicopter pilot
- Peace! Love! Chewing Gum! (2020-2023) - Maksim Nikolayevich
- Champion of the World (2021) – Viktor Baturinsky
- Infiltration (2022) – Ivanych

=== Voice acting ===
- Little Longnose (2003) – superstitious castle guard
- The Tale of Soldier Fedot, The Daring Fellow (2008) – King of Russia
- Ivan Tsarevich and the Gray Wolf (2011) – First Minister

== Awards and honors ==
- Merited Artist of the Russian Federation (3 April 2002)
- Nika Award for Best Actor (2004) – for his performance as Paul I of Russia in Poor Poor Paul
- Honorary Citizen of Orekhovo-Zuyevo (26 October 2006)
- Golden Eagle Award for Best Supporting Actor (2007) – for his performance as father Philaret in The Island
- Nika Award for Best Supporting Actor (2007) – for his performance as father Philaret in The Island
- People's Artist of Russia (11 March 2008)
- Golden Eagle Award for Best Supporting Actor (2011) – for his performance as Vsevolod Sergeyev in Silent Souls
- Order of Friendship (17 November 2011)
- Medal "For Liberation of Crimea and Sevastopol" (17 March 2014)
- Order of Honour (29 April 2019)
- Medal "In Commemoration of the 10th Anniversary of Sevastopol's Return to Russia" (22 October 2024)

== See also ==
- Sergei Bodrov Jr.
- Darya Jurgens
