= Yarema Kovaliv =

Ukrainian lawyer (born 1976)

- Ковалів Ярема Богданович

Head of the State Agency of Fisheries of Ukraine

Personal details
- Born: July 9, 1976 (age 49) Ukraine, URSR
- Citizenship: Ukraine

Yarema Bogdanovich Kovaliv (Ukrainian: Ярема Богданович Ковалів; born July 9, 1976) is a Ukrainian attorney and government administrator. He became head of the State Agency of Fisheries of Ukraine in April, 2015.

== Career ==
His career as a lawyer began in the company Veneto. In 2003 he became head of its legal department.

From 2003 to 2007, he worked for TNK BP.

From 2007 to 2009, he headed the legal department of MD Retail.

From 2009 to 2013 he served as head of the Legal Department for Arricano Real Estate plc. From December 2013 to September 2014 he was acting CEO for that company. From November 2014 to April 2015 he was a member of the board of directors there. In September 2013 the shares of Arricano Real Estate listed on the AIM London Stock Exchange.

On April 8, 2015 Kovaliv was appointed as head of the State Agency of Fisheries of Ukraine by the Cabinet of Ministers of Ukraine resolution No.308-p. He carried out reforms of the fishing industry. In 2015, he began large-scale deregulation: cancellation of 7 permitting documents, which created the basis for corruption; development of aquaculture and mariculture; prohibition of industrial fishing in the Dnieper river in Kyiv. Kovaliv started to reform fishery protection authorities, whose quality of work led to distrust of society. Kovaliv started a new authority - fishing patrol in December 2015. On 16 June 2016 the first fisheries protection patrol started its work.

Kovaliv legally protected the Ukrainian oceanic fishing fleet from attacks by the government of occupied Crimea. In 2015, for the first time since 1997, the oceanic fishing fleet brought to the state 19 million hrn, at least 13 million hrn was dividends for Ukraine. In addition, he significantly improved working conditions on Ukrainian ships and the ship Ivan Holubec received a new shipper. In addition, he took a part in the process of refunding oil tanker Tamanskiy, that costs approximately US$1 million. This required a legal battle with the government of occupied Crimea, which attempted to nationalize the tanker.

== Personal life ==
He is married to Yulia Kovaliv.

== See also ==
- Nataliia Greshchuk
