= The Castle (1994 film) =

- DVD cover
- Directed by: Aleksei Balabanov
- Written by: Franz Kafka (novel); Aleksei Balabanov
- Produced by: Sergei Selyanov
- Starring: Nikolay Stotsky; Svetlana Pismichenko; Viktor Sukhorukov; Anwar Libabov
- Cinematography: Sergey Yurizditsky; Andrey Zhegalov
- Edited by: Tamara Lipartia
- Music by: Sergey Kuryokhin
- Production companies: Orient Express; Lenfilm; National Center of Cinematography; Bioskop Film; Hamburg Film Fund
- Release date: 1994
- Running time: 120 minutes
- Countries: Russia; Germany; France
- Language: Russian

The Castle (Russian: Замок, romanized: Zamok) is a 1994 film directed by Aleksei Balabanov. It is the second notable screen version of Kafka’s unfinished novel The Castle. It tells of an individual desperately trying to preserve his identity while struggling against sinister and invisible bureaucrats who rule the village from inside the titular castle. The picture is noted for costumes/sets design in Bruegelian style, it won Best Art Direction and Best Costumes at the 1994 Nika Awards.

== Cast ==
- Nikolay Stotsky – Zemlemer
- Svetlana Pismichenko – Frida
- Viktor Sukhorukov – Zemlemer's assistant Jeremiah
- Anwar Libabov – Zemlemer's assistant Arthur
- Igor Shibanov – Brunswick
- Aleksei German – Clamm
- Bolot Beyshenaliyev – village headman
- Olga Antonova – innkeeper
- Svetlana Svirko – Olga

== See also ==
- The Castle by Michael Haneke
