= Aleksei Balabanov =

Russian filmmaker (1959–2013)

- Алексей Балабанов
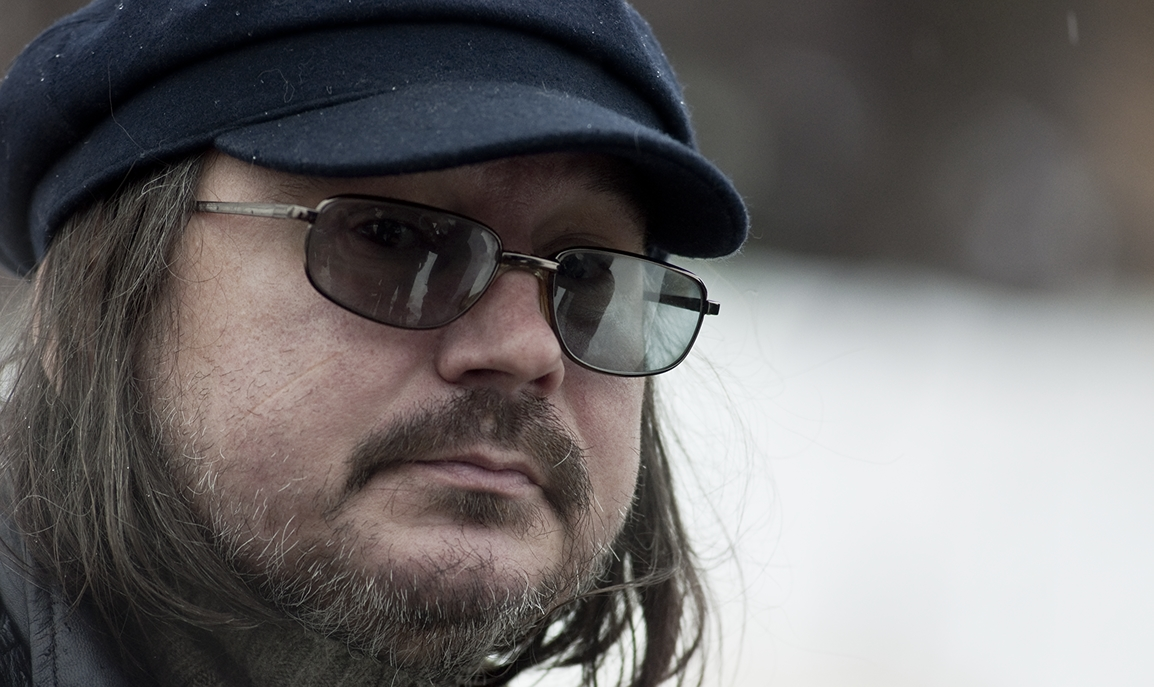
- Balabanov in 2010
- Born: 25 February 1959; Sverdlovsk, Russian SFSR, USSR
- Died: 18 May 2013 (aged 54); Sestroretsk, Saint Petersburg, Russia
- Occupations: Film director; screenwriter; producer
- Years active: 1989–2012

Aleksei Oktyabrinovich Balabanov (Russian: Алeксeй Oктябpинoвич Балабанoв; 25 February 1959 – 18 May 2013) was a Russian filmmaker. A member of the European Film Academy, he began his career by creating mostly arthouse pictures and music videos but gained significant mainstream popularity in action crime drama movies Brother (1997) and Brother 2 (2000), both of which starred Sergei Bodrov, Jr. Later, Balabanov directed the films Cargo 200 (2007), Morphine (2008), and A Stoker (2010), which also received critical recognition.

== Life and career ==
Balabanov was born on 25 February 1959, in Sverdlovsk (now Yekaterinburg).

In 1981, Balabanov graduated from the Translation Department of the Gorky Pedagogical University of Foreign Languages. He then served in the Soviet Army as an officer-interpreter. After his discharge, he worked as an assistant film director at the Sverdlovsk Film Studio. from 1983 to 1987. Balabanov shot his first film in 1987, in the Urals. The script of the film was written over the course of one night. This low-budget work was filmed in a restaurant. Later, Balabanov studied at the experimental workshop "Auteur Cinema" (Russian: Авторское кино) at High Courses for Scriptwriters and Film Directors, graduating in 1990.

Balabanov lived and worked in St. Petersburg From 1990.

In 1991, Balabanov directed his feature film debut Happy Days based on the works of Samuel Beckett. It was screened at the Cannes Film Festival in 1994. In 1994, Balabanov, together with Sergey Selyanov and Viktor Sergeyev, founded the production company CTV. That same year, he directed an adaptation of Franz Kafka's The Castle.

His next film, Brother (1997), a crime drama about a contract killer, was a box-office and critical success. The film featured music by the band Nautilus Pompilus for which Balabanov had previously directed several music videos. It was screened at the Cannes Film Festival in 1997. It was a breakthrough film for Balabanov and the lead actor Sergei Bodrov Jr., making them instantly known throughout Russia. The success of the movie led to the creation of the sequel, Brother 2, also directed by Balabanov and starring Bodrov. The film is set in Chicago.

He directed Of Freaks and Men in 1998 about the emerging pornography business in turn-of-the-century Imperial Russia. The film premiered at the Directors' Fortnight of 1998 Cannes Film Festival.

Dead Man's Bluff (2005) was Balabanov's first foray into dark comedy.

Cargo 200 (2007), partially based on Faulkner's novel Sanctuary, was controversial among critics and audiences because of the graphic display of violence in the film. Cannes Film Festival programmer Joël Chapron likened the picture to a "snuff film" at the Sochi Film Festival premiere.

Balabanov's last completed film was Me Too, which was screened at the Venice Film Festival in 2012.

=== Personal life ===
He was married to costume designer Nadezhda Vasilyeva. He had two sons.

=== Death ===
Balabanov struggled to cope with the death of actor and close friend Sergei Bodrov Jr., who was killed during the Kolka–Karmadon rock ice slide while filming Bodrov Jr.'s later-cancelled film Messenger in September 2002. Also killed by the mudslide were 41 cast and crew members of Messenger, many of whom had also worked with Balabanov. Balabanov felt guilty over Bodrov Jr.'s death as he had suggested the shooting location to him. Prior to that, in 2000, actress Tuyara Svinoboeva had been killed in a car crash during the shoot of The River. Balabanov's alcohol consumption increased considerably and he died on 18 May 2013 of a heart attack.

Balabanov was buried near his father's grave at Smolensky Cemetery in St. Petersburg.

== Unfinished projects ==
Prior to his death, Balabanov was reportedly planning to make a film on Stalin, portraying him as a 'godfather of crime'.

After a fatal car crash on set, Balabanov's film The River about a leper colony in Yakutia was released as a short film with a voiceover narrating unfilmed parts of the story.

== Legacy ==
Largely due to the popularity of Brother and Brother 2, Balabanov is frequently cited as one of Russia's greatest ever film directors.

== Works ==
=== Filmography ===
Year	English title	Original title		Notes	Ref
Year	English title	Cyrillic	Transliteration	Notes	Ref
1987	There Used to Be Another Time	Раньше было другое время	Ran'she bylo drugoye vremya	short film	
1988	I Don't Have a Friend or One Step Beyond	У меня нет друга, или One step beyond	U menya net druga, ili One step beyond	short film	
1989	Nastya and Yegor	Настя и Егор	Nastya i Yegor	short documentary	
1990	On Aviation in Russia	О воздушном летании в России	O vozdushnom letanii v Rossii	short documentary, graduation film	
1991	Happy Days	Счастливые дни	Schastlivyye dni	Based on the play of the same name as well as The Expelled/The Calmative/The End with First Love by Samuel Beckett	
1991	Border Conflict	Пограничный конфликт	Pogranichnyy konflikt		
1994	The Castle	Замок	Zamok		
1995	Pribytiye poyezda			segment "Trofim"	
1997	Brother	Брат	Brat		
1998	Of Freaks and Men	Про уродов и людей	Pro urodov i lyudey		
2000	Brother 2	Брат 2	Brat 2		
2002	The River	Река	Reka		
2002	War	Война	Voyna		
2005	Dead Man's Bluff	Жмурки	Zhmurki		
2006	It Doesn't Hurt Me	Мне не больно	Mne ne bol'no		
2007	Cargo 200	Груз 200	Gruz 200		
2008	Morphia	Морфий	Morfiy		
2010	A Stoker	Кочегар	Kochegar		
2012	Me Too	Я тоже хочу	Ya tozhe khochu		

=== Music videos ===
Balabanov directed several music videos:

- Three clips for the band Nautilus Pompilius: "A glimpse from the screen" (Russian: Взгляд с экрана, 1988), "Pure demon" (Russian: Чистый бес, 1992), and "In the rain" (Russian: Во время дождя, 1997; soundtrack to his movie Brother);
- A clip for Nastya (band): "Stratosphere" (Russian: Стратосфера, 1989);
- Together with the director Valery Makushchenko, a clip for the band Bi-2: "No One Writes to the Colonel" (Russian: Полковнику никто не пишет, 2000; soundtrack to his film Brother 2).

=== Bibliography ===
- Florian Weinhold (2013), Path of Blood: The Post-Soviet Gangster, His Mistress and Their Others in Aleksei Balabanov's Genre Films. Reaverlands Books: North Charleston, SC.

==== Notes ====
- Aleksei Balabanov was awarded the "Best Director" award for the film Me Too (Я тоже хочу) (2012) at the Saint Petersburg International Film Festival.

== See also ==
- Sergei Bodrov, Jr.
- Viktor Sukhorukov
