= Bi-2 =

Belarusian pop-rock band

BI-2
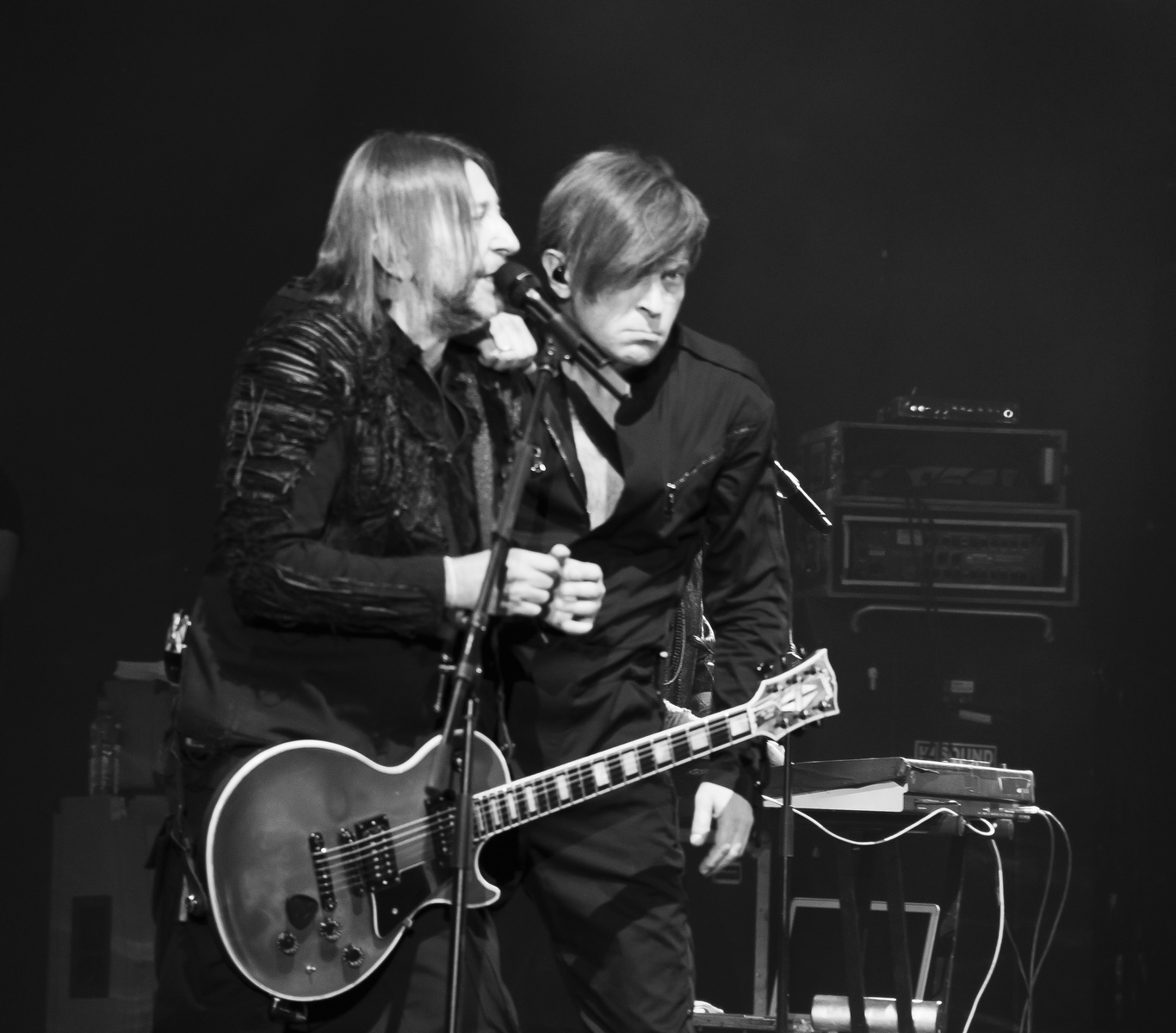
- Shura (left) and Lyova (right) in Moscow, 2018

Background information
- Origin: Babruysk, Belarus
- Genres: Alternative rock; post-grunge; indie rock; new wave
- Years active: 1988–1991, 1998–present
- Members: Lyova Bi-2 (Yegor Bortnik); Shura Bi-2 (Alexandr Uman); Konstantin Chalyh; Maxim Andrusschenko; Boris Lifshitz; Yanik Nikolenko

Bi-2 (Note: Russian: Би-2, romanized: Bi-dva) is a Belarusian pop-rock band, formed in 1988 in Babruysk. During their career, Bi-2 achieved international success in Eastern Europe.

Bi-2 was named the Best Rock Act at the MTV Russian Music Awards in 2007. They also received other Russian and international prizes, including ZD Awards and World Music Awards. In 2015, Bi-2 was named the best Russian rock band according to Music Box. Included in the Top Hit Music Awards Hall of Fame, along with such performers as Svetlana Loboda and Andrey Makarevich.

Participant of many Russian and European music festivals, including the festival "Christmas Meetings of Alla Pugacheva" and others.

In 2023, the band members emigrated to Israel.

== History ==
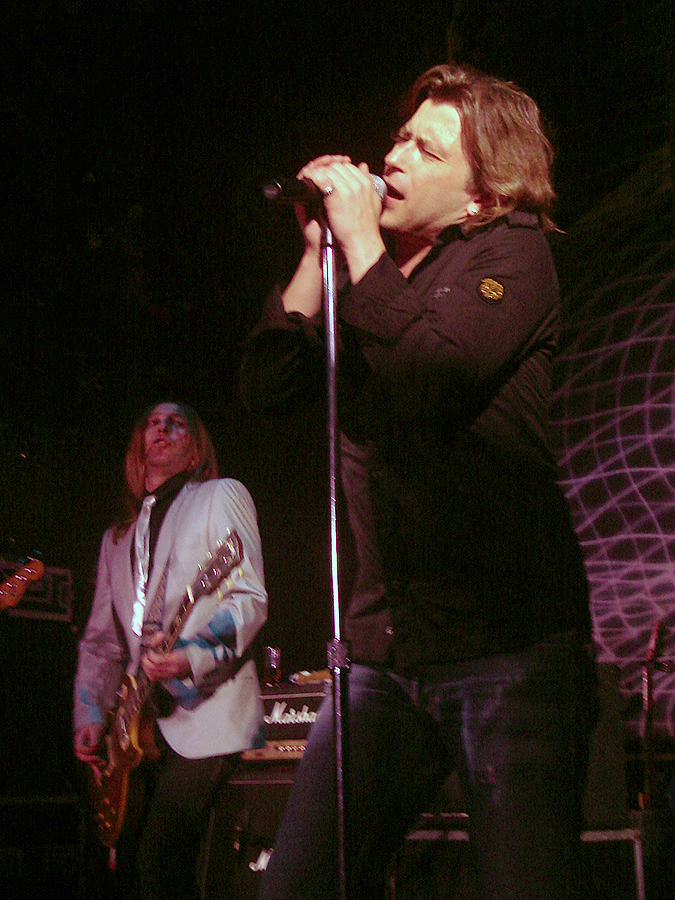
Bi-2 in Köln, 2008

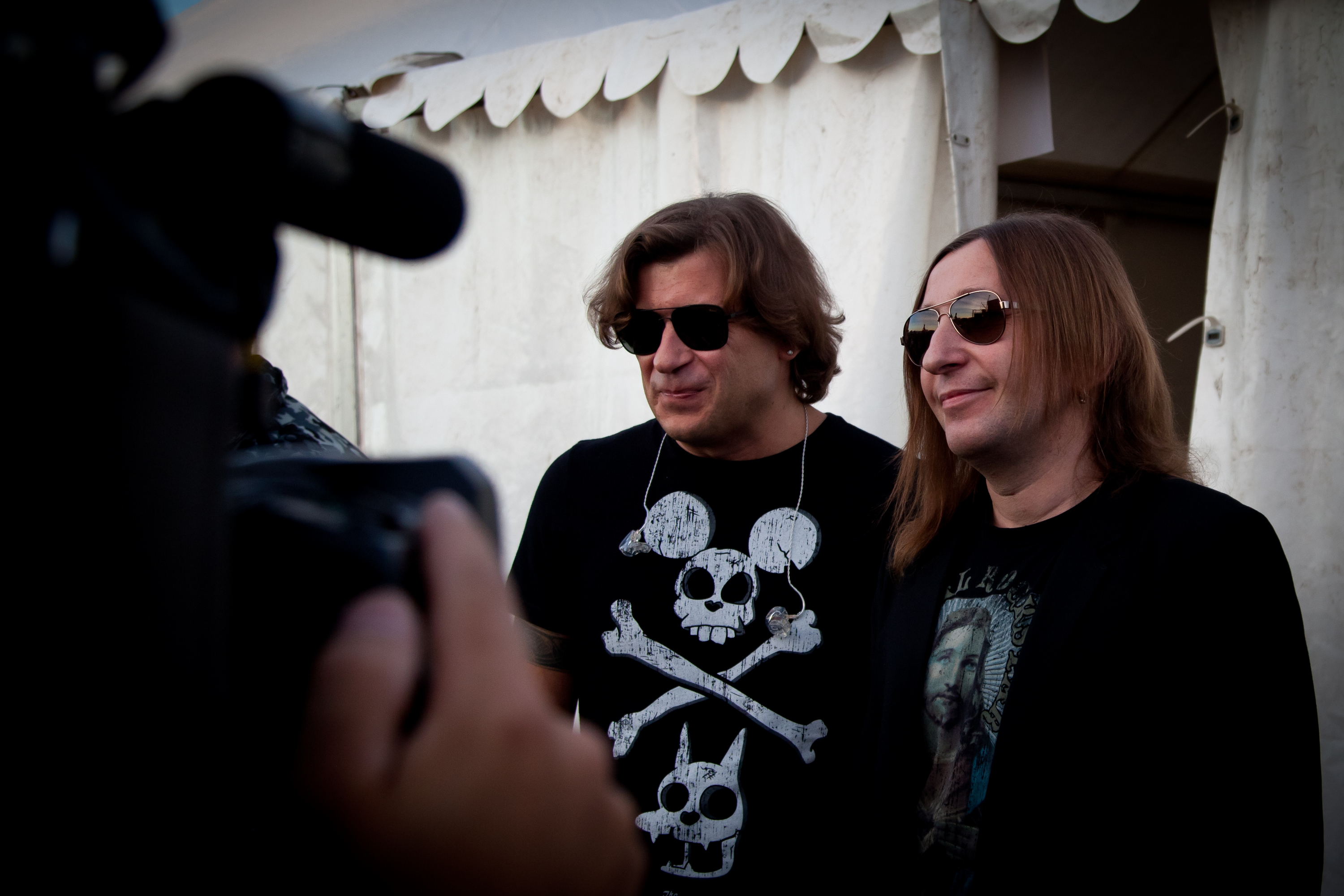
Bi-2 at rock festival "Ostrov" (Krasnoflotsky island, Arkhangelsk), 2013

The band was formed in 1988 in Bobruisk, Belarus, by two teenagers, Aleksandr "Shura" Uman and Yegor "Lyova" Bortnik, who were amateur actors. Initially, the band's name was "Bratya po Oruzhiyu" (Brothers in Arms), which was formed in 1988, then "Bereg Istini" (Shore of Truth), which resulted in the abbreviation BI-2. Lyova and Shura began to use this moniker as their stage names, and Shura eventually changed his passport surname to Bi-II.

At the beginning of the 1990s the two moved to Israel and as Jews received citizenship, but in 1993 Shura moved to Australia while Lyova remained and served in the Israel Defense Forces. In 1994 Shura formed a romantic and professional relationship with pianist and artist Victoria Bilogan and in 1997 they recorded their first album "Bespolaya i Grustnaya Lyubov" ("Sexless and Sad Love"). During this time, Lyova and Shura continued to compose music together, exchanging their recordings and guitar tabs via Internet and phone. Before forming Chiron, Shura collaborated with Dee Ellus, his first English lyricist, in 1993 and 1994. Shura, together with Dino Molinaro and Michael Aliani, former members of Ikon, formed the darkwave band Chiron. In 1998 Lyova moved to Australia and joined Chiron as well, but the two left the project in less than two years to continue with their own band.

In 1999 Bi-2 moved to Russia, where the band had previously tried to release its 1997 album "Bespolaya i Grustnaya Lubov" ("Sexless and Sad Love," 1998), but those plans were ruined by the 1998 Russian financial crisis, which affected the record business. In 1999, the band consisted of only two men, but the lineup soon was increased by session musicians. The band gained popularity only in 2000 when it recorded the songs for the soundtrack to the popular Brother 2 movie by Aleksei Balabanov. Several score songs, included in the Bi-2 eponymous debut album, shook rock radio charts, including the influential Nashe Radio chart.

Bi-2 continued with "Meow Kiss Me" (2001) and "Foreign Cars" (2004), both achieving gold album status in Russia. Each of their albums included duet recordings with other rock musicians from such bands as Splean, Chaif, Nochniye Snaiperi, and Zemfira, among others. Videos for Bi-2 songs often appear on MTV Russia. In 2005 the double CD "Odd Warrior" was released, which consists completely of duets and collaborations.

In 2022, the band opposed the Russian invasion of Ukraine and refused to sing at venues that had banners supporting the invasion. Their concerts in Russia were eventually canceled, and they were forced to emigrate. By May 2023, they were touring the United States and giving concerts. Lyova Bi-2 wrote on social media that he would not return to Russia.

In January 2024, members of the group were arrested in Thailand for allegedly violating work permit regulations and faced possible deportation to Russia because five of its members have Russian citizenship. As those members also have citizenship of other countries (Israel and Australia), the issue became a diplomatic concern involving several countries, also fueled by arguments that the Russian request is related to silencing political dissidents. On 1 February 2024, the entire group was sent instead to Israel.

At the end of May 2024, Maksim Andriushchenko of the band (with his son) and three other persons (alongside their families) associated with it, have been granted the citizenship of Moldova.

== Discography ==
=== Unreleased albums ===
- Traitors Of Motherland (Russian: Изменники Родины; 1988–1991)

=== Studio albums ===
- Sexless and Sad Love (Бесполая и грустная любовь; 1998)
- Bi-2 (Би-2; 2000)
- Meow Kiss Me (Мяу Кисс Ми; 2001)
- Cars Of Foreign Make (Иномарки; 2004)
- Moloko (Молоко; 2006) (lit.: Milk)
- Amusement Park (Луна-парк; 2009)
- What Men Talk About (О чём говорят мужчины; the soundtrack to the film of the same name, 2010)
- Spirit (2011)
- #16plus (#16плюс; 2014)
- Event Horizon (Горизонт событий; 2017)
- Hallelujah (Аллилуйя; 2022)
- A Journey Around the Sun (Путешествие вокруг солнца; 2026)

=== Re-released albums ===
- BI-2 (+2 tracks; 2000)
- Sexless and Sad Love (+ Bonus CD; 2004)
- Milk (+2 tracks; 2007)

=== Singles ===
- Silver (Серебро; 2000)
- Wolves (Волки; 2001)
- My Love (Моя любовь; 2001)
- Sand (Песок; 2003)
- Slow Star feat. Diana Arbenina (Медленная звезда; 2005)
- Muse (Муза; 2008)
- Bowie (Digital Single) (2009)
- Christmas (Digital Single) (2009)
- Optimist (Оптимист, 2011) (Digital Single)
- Non-Air-Raid Alarm (Безвоздушная тревога; 2011)
- Island (Остров; 2011)
- #Hipster (#Хипстер; 2014)
- Dark Skies (Тёмные небеса; 2014)
- Taken To The Army (Забрали в армию; 2014)
- Grass Near The House (Трава у дома; 2015)
- Likes / Alice (Лайки / Алиса; 2016)
- Bird On The Windowsill (Птица на подоконнике; 2016)
- Pilot (Лётчик; 2017)
- Whiskey feat. John Grant (Виски; 2017)

=== EPs (Extended Plays) ===
- Kite (Бумажный змей; 2010)

=== Compilations ===
- Fellini Tour (live album recorded with Splean and Thomas; 2001)
- Bi-2. Collection (2CD; 2005)
- Bi-2 feat. Symphony Orchestra of Ministry of Internal Affairs Of Russia (Би-2 и Симфонический оркестр МВД России; 2010)

=== Remixes ===
- drum[a] (2002)

=== Internet-releases ===
- Bi-2. Live (2000)
- Unplugged@16tons (2003)
- Part Of Pipes (Партия дудок; 2004)
- Rock Festival In Mogilev 1989 (Могилёвский рок-съезд 1989; 2005)
- Seventh Day (Седьмой день; 2006) (Soundtrack)
- Rare Album (Раритетный; 2006)
- Without Words I (Без слов I; 2008)
- Without Words II (Без слов II, 2008)
- Fools of Fortune (Превратности судьбы; 2009) (Soundtrack)
- One Song By One Tour (C гастролей по песне; 2010) (Bootleg)
- Unplugged@16tons (Re-Released) (2010)
- And Ship Is Sailing (И крабль плывёт; 2010)
- Without Words III (Без слов III, 2012)
- Spirit (Without Words... IV) (Spirit (Без слов… IV), 2013)
- Bi-2 feat. Prague Metropolitan Symphonic orchestra (Without Words V) (Би-2 и Prague Metropolitan Symphonic orchestra (Без слов V); 2013)

=== Chiron's releases ===
- Eve (2000)
- Bleed (2004)

=== Other projects' releases ===
- Odd Warrior (Нечётный воин; 2005)
- Odd Warrior 2 (Нечётный воин-2; 2007)
- Odd Warrior 2,5 (Нечётный воин-2,5; 2011)
- Odd Warrior 3 (Нечётный воин-3; 2013)
- Odd Warrior. The Best (Нечётный воин. Лучшее; 2015)

== See also ==
- Russian pop music
