= Darya Jurgens =

Russian actress

- Дарья Юргенс
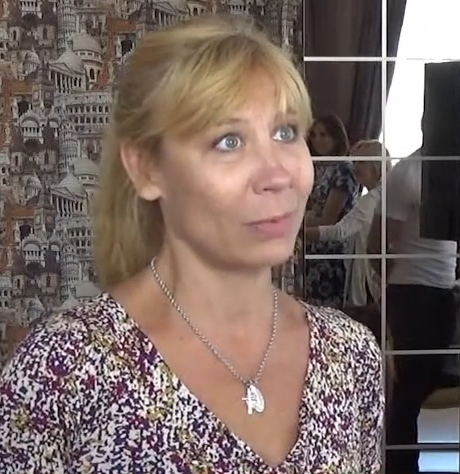
- Born: 20 January 1968 (age 58); Tomsk
- Other name: Darya Lesnikova
- Occupation: Actress
- Years active: 1987–present

Darya Georgievna Jurgens (Russian: Дарья Георгиевна Юргенс) is a Russian actress most noted for her role in the film Brother 2 as prostitute Marilyn / Dasha. Until 2003, she was known as Darya Lesnikova. She has had a long career, both in stage, television, and film.

Merited Artist of the Russian Federation (2005).

== TV series ==
- 2001—2002 — Streets of Broken Lights as Veronika
- 2013 — Sherlock Holmes as Jessica Carrie

== Films ==
- 1987 — The Pathfinder as the officer's wife
- 1998 — Of Freaks and Men as Grunya
- 2000 — Brother 2 as Marilyn / Dasha
- 2005 — The Italian as Mukhin's mother
- 2020 — Zoya as Zoya's mother
