= Time value =

In finance, time value is:

- Time value of money; or
- Time value of an option.

In transport economics, time value refers to:

- Value of time

In photography and cameras TVs, time value refers to:

- $T_v$ in the APEX system (Additive System of Photographic Exposure)
- Time value mode (Tv mode), a shutter priority mode on electronically controlled cameras
