= Irina Saltykova =

Russian singer (born 1966)

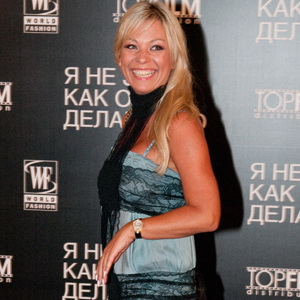
- In 2011

Background information
- Born: Irina Ivanovna Sapronova; 5 May 1966 (age 60)
- Origin: Donskoy, Tula Oblast, RSFSR, Soviet Union
- Genres: Pop, rock
- Occupations: Singer, actress
- Years active: 1986–present
- Website: saltykova.ru

Irina Ivanovna Saltykova (Russian: Ирина Ивановна Салтыкова, IPA: [ɪˈrʲinə ɪˈvanəvnə sɐltɨˈkovə]; née Sapronova – Сапронова [sɐˈpronəvə]; born 5 May 1966) is a Russian pop singer and a former member of the music group Mirage, which was popular in Russia in the 1990s. She released six albums and four singles. She also did some acting, particularly in the film Brother 2. In June 2000, was featured in Russian Playboy.

== Life ==
She was born in the city of Donskoy, Tula Oblast, in the then Soviet Union. During her school years, she successfully engaged in artistic gymnastics. Sapronova also attended cutting, sewing, and knitting classes. In 1985, she graduated from the Civil Engineering College and, in 1990, from the Moscow Civil Engineering Institute. In 1985, Sapronova met her future husband, singer Viktor Saltykov in Sochi. In 1987, she gave birth to a daughter, Alisa. In the beginning of the 1990s, Saltykova's marriage broke apart. In 1994, Saltykova debuted as a solo artist.

Starting from 2000, she appeared in films and TV series, including Brother 2 (2000), Russky spetsnaz (Russian SWAT, 2002), Provintsialy (Provincials, 2002), Dayosh molodyozh! (Let's Do It, Youth!, 2009–2013), and Pilot mezhdunarodnykh avialiniy (The Pilot of International Airlines, 2011).

== Discography ==
=== Albums ===
- Serye glaza (Gray Eyes, 1995)
- Golubye glazki (Blue Eyes, 1996)
- Alisa (1998)
- Sudba... (Fate, 2001)
- Ya tvoya (I'm Yours, 2004)
- Byla Ne byla (Come What May, 2008)

=== Singles ===
- Serye glaza (Gray Eyes, 1995)
- Za mnoi (Follow me, 2016)
- Slovo No (The Word But, 2018)
- Devchenki (Girls, 2018)

=== Compilations ===
- The Best (1998)
- ...Dlya tebya (12 luchshikh videoklipov) (For You, 12 Best Music Videos, 2007)
