= Masha i Medvedi =

Russian rock band

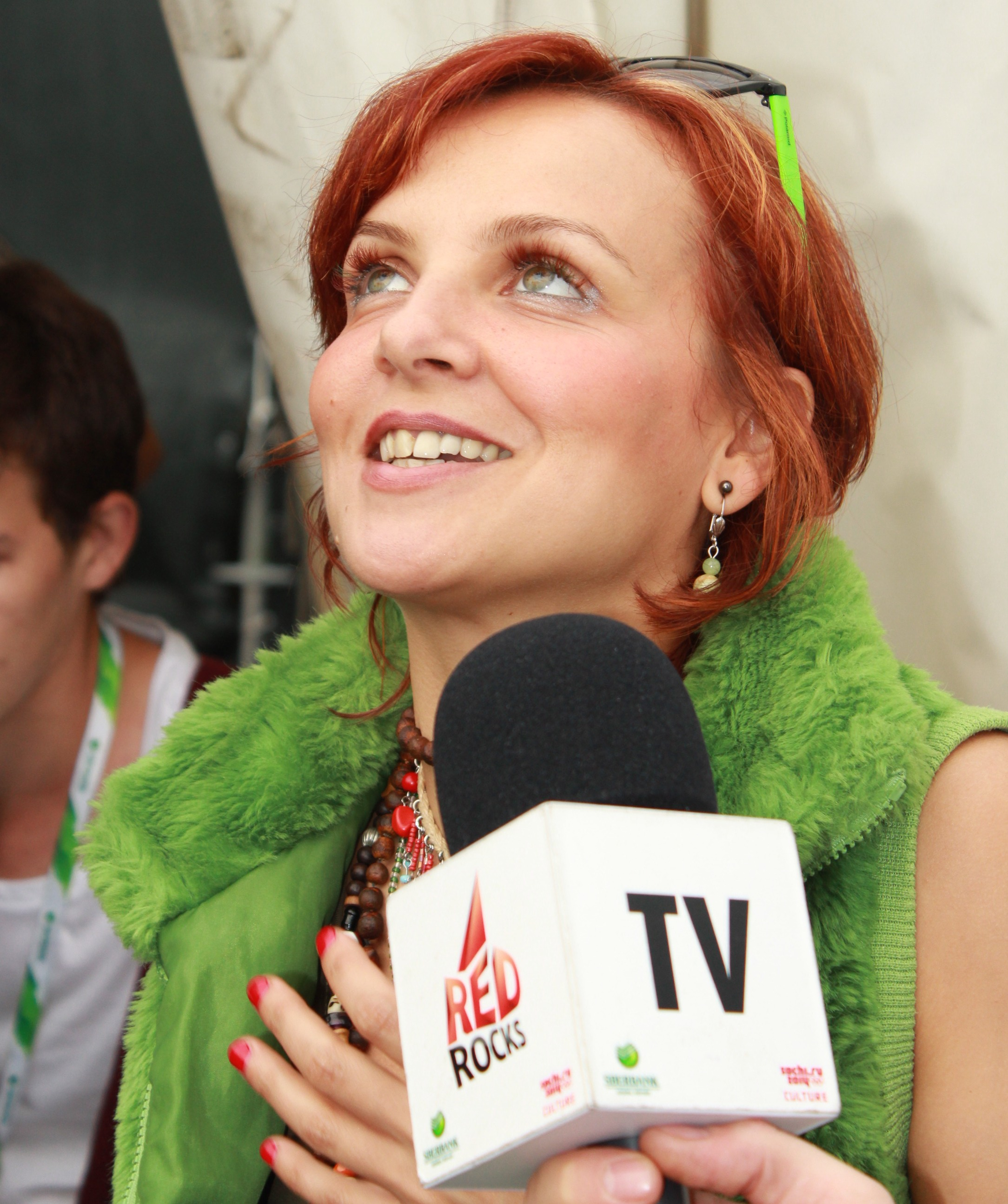
- Maria Makarova, 2013

Background information
- Origin: Krasnodar, Russia
- Genres: indie rock, folk rock, psychedelic rock, alternative rock
- Years active: 1997 — 2000; 2004 — present
- Website: masha-i-medvedi.ru

Masha i Medvedi (Russian: Маша и Медведи, lit. 'Masha and the Bears') are a Russian rock band formed in 1997 by Maria Makarova.

Band name is from a Russian children’s book by the same name.

== History ==
The starting point for the band's history was the moment in 1996, when Maria Makarova handed over her demo to Oleg Nesterov of the band Megapolis which was on tour in her native Krasnodar. 13 January 1997, when Makarova signed a contract with Nesterov to become her producer, is considered to be the official date of the band's formation. Later that year the line-up was completed. Supported by the management company Snegiri Music, they moved to Moscow and signed to Extraphone Records which released their debut album Solntseklesh in 1998. The videos for the songs "Lyubochka" and "B. T. (Without you)" were shot in India and directed by Mikhail Khleborodov. All the lyrics for the album were written by the singer herself, with the exception of "Lyubochka", a humorous take on the children's poem by Agniya Barto.

Both the album and the band received the Discovery of 1998 award at the Maxidrom festival, organized by Radio Maximum and held at the Moscow's Olympiysky. The band's numerous accolades for that year included Band of the Year (Matador magazine), Debut of the Year (OM), Singer of the Year (for Makarova, Moskovsky Komsomolets), Song of the Year ("Lyubochka", Radio Maximum). "Lyubochka" spent 16 weeks in the Moskovsky Komsomolets Charts and reached its top spot four times. The band's second single, "Reykjavik" (and the video for it, shot in Iceland), were also lauded by Russian media. The band headlined several major events in Russia (Sochi Riviera, MehaHaus, June 1998) and abroad (City Festival, Kyiv, September 1998).

The band's second album Where? was released on March 8, 2000 by Extraphone. Two video clips were shot for the song "Zemlya" (Earth), which in 2000 appeared in the soundtrack for the film Brother 2.

The group disbanded in 2000, due to a conflict between Masha Makarova and the rest of the group. They reformed in 2004 to record Bez yazyka (Without language), their third studio album, released by Style Records in 2006, then resumed touring, performing mostly in Russian clubs. Their next major release, conceived as a puzzle and thematically linked to the expected 'end of the world' (according to the Mayan calendar) came out in four parts and was finally released as the two EPs, Konets (The End, 2012) and Gusenitsy (Caterpillars, 2013). On February 23, 2017, the new single "Mira Voyna" (War of the Peace) was released.

== Line-up ==
- Masha Makarova - vocals, acoustic guitar, flute, songwriter.
- Vyacheslav Motylev (Hottabych) - guitar.
- Maxim Khomich - guitar.
- George Avanesyan (Geo) - bass.
- Vyacheslav Kozyrev (Green) - percussion.

== Discography ==
=== Studio albums ===
- 1998 - Solntseklesh (Extraphone)
- 2000 - Where? (Extraphone)
- 2006 - Without language (Style Records)

=== EPs ===
- 2012 - The End
- 2013 - Caterpillars
