= Happy Days (1991 film) =

1991 film

- Directed by: Aleksei Balabanov
- Written by: Aleksei Balabanov; Samuel Beckett
- Produced by: Aleksei German
- Starring: Viktor Sukhorukov
- Cinematography: Sergei Astakhov
- Edited by: Inna Shlyonskaya
- Release date: 1991
- Running time: 86 minutes
- Country: Soviet Union
- Language: Russian

Happy Days (Russian: Счастливые дни, translit. Schastlivye dni) is a 1991 Soviet drama film directed by Aleksei Balabanov. Based on Samuel Beckett's The Expelled/The Calmative/The End with First Love (1945) as well as Happy Days (1961), it was Balabanov's feature film directorial debut. It was screened in the Un Certain Regard section at the 1992 Cannes Film Festival.

== Plot ==
The film portrays a desolate St. Petersburg, with peeling windows in ancient, sparsely inhabited buildings, and empty trams traveling aimlessly through deserted streets. Wandering alone through this bleak landscape is an unnamed man with no memory, no past, and no friends. The rare individuals he encounters address him differently—some call him Sergey Sergeyevich, others Peter. A delicate blonde woman he meets at a snow-covered cemetery calls him Boris and claims to be expecting his child. Each person he meets demands something from him, but his only desire is to find a room where he can live, however, even this modest goal proves to be unattainable.

== Cast ==
- Viktor Sukhorukov
- Anzhelika Nevolina
- Yevgeni Merkuryev
- Georgi Tejkh
- Nikolai Lavrov
