= Of Freaks and Men =

- Directed by: Aleksei Balabanov
- Written by: Aleksei Balabanov
- Produced by: Sergei Selyanov
- Starring: Sergei Makovetsky; Dinara Drukarova; Viktor Sukhorukov; Lika Nevolina; Alexey Dyo; Chinghiz Tsydendambaev; Igor Shibanov
- Cinematography: Sergei Astakhov
- Edited by: Marina Lipartia
- Production companies: STV; SoyuzKino
- Release date: 1998
- Running time: 89 minutes
- Country: Russia
- Language: Russian

Of Freaks and Men (Russian: Про уродов и людей, romanized: Pro urodov i lyudey) is a 1998 Russian historical comedy-drama film written and directed by Aleksei Balabanov.

== Synopsis ==
In the beginning of the twentieth century, two seemingly prosperous families become associated with the mysterious Johann, the owner of a photo studio, in the basement of which a certain photographic theater honouring the Marquis de Sade was created. Photographic postcards are produced with the humbled nakedness of the human body, causing lust and gloating triumph of power. Johann has the look of a photographer who knows how to see angel curls and a sweet smile in a girl, and the same look that corrupts the body, the look of a pornographer. Over and over again, Johann destroys the well-being of families and turns ordinary people into freaks, seized with vice.

== Premise ==
Filmed initially in black and white, then entirely in sepia tone, this film set in turn-of-the-century Russia is centered on two families and their decline at the hands of one man, Johann, and his pornographic endeavours. Hailed by some as a masterpiece, the movie comments on the decline of Russian society as a result of the rise of capitalism.

== Cast ==
- Dinara Drukarova as Lisa Radlova
- Sergei Makovetsky as Johann Kehl, owner of a photo studio
- Vadim Prokhorov as Putilov, young photographer working for Kehl
- Viktor Sukhorukov as Viktor Ivanovich, Johann's henchman
- Alexander Mezentsev as Dr Stasov, the Siamese twins' adoptive father
- Lika Nevolina as Ekaterina, Dr Stasov's blind wife
- Alexey Dyo and Chinghiz Tsydendambaev as Kolya and Tolya, the Siamese twins
- Igor Shibanov as Engineer Radlov, Lisa's father
- Darya Jurgens as Grunya, Radlov's housemaid and mistress and Johann's sister
- Tatyana Polonskaya as Darya
- Richard Bogutsky as the notary
- Olga Straumit as Johann's nanny
- Boris Smolkin as the photographer
- Ilya Shakunov as the man in the show-window
- Yuri Galtsev as the impresario

== Soundtrack ==
The soundtrack is taken from Prokofiev's ballet, Romeo and Juliet; and Mussorgsky's Pictures at an Exhibition.

== Awards ==
At the 1998 Russian Guild of Film Critics Awards the picture was awarded the prizes for Best Director (Alexei Balabanov), Best Director of Photography (Sergei Astakhov), Best Art Direction (Vera Zelinskaya), Best Male Actor (Sergei Makovetsky) and Best Supporting Actor (Maksim Sukhanov).

At the Nika Awards the film received the prizes for Best Film and Best Director (Alexei Balabanov).

== See also ==
- List of post-1960s films in black-and-white
- Sadism and masochism in fiction
