= Vyacheslav Butusov =

Russian singer-songwriter (born 1961)

Vyacheslav Butusov Вячеслав Бутусов
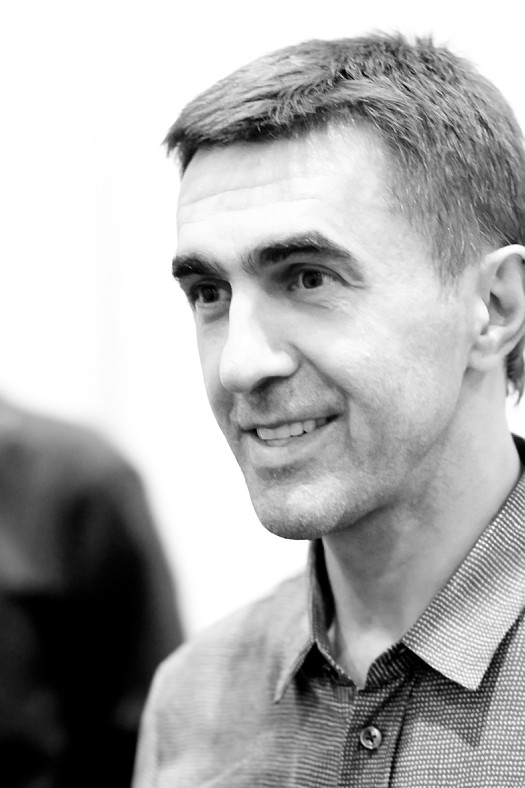
- Butusov in 2011

Background information
- Born: 15 October 1961 (age 64); Krasnoyarsk, Russian SFSR, Soviet Union
- Occupations: Singer; songwriter; composer
- Musical career
- Genres: Alternative rock; art rock; new wave; rock and roll; electronic; post-punk; Christian rock
- Instruments: Vocals; guitar; bass guitar; keyboard
- Years active: 1978–present
- Label: Nikitin
- Formerly of: Nautilus Pompilius; U-Piter
- Website: butusov.ru

Vyacheslav Gennadievich Butusov (Russian: Вячеслав Геннадьевич Бутусов; born 15 October 1961) is a Russian singer-songwriter and composer. He was the lead singer of Nautilus Pompilius and U-Piter. Since 2019, he has been playing in his group "Orden Slavy". He also has a solo career as a singer-songwriter.

== Musical career ==
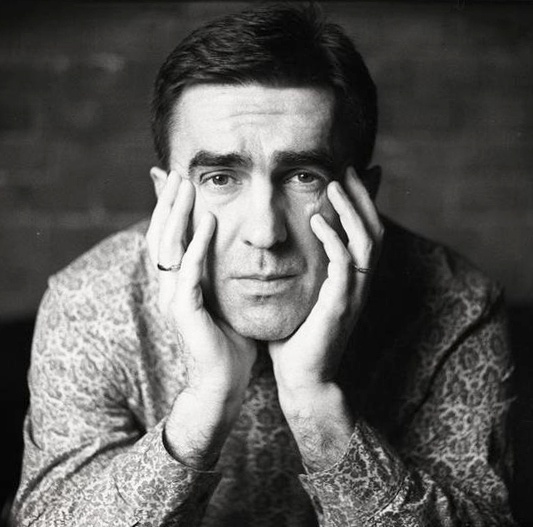
Butusov in 2008

=== 1982–1997: Nautilus Pompilius ===
While he was a first-year student at the Sverdlovsk Architectural Institute, he was acquainted with musician Dmitry Umetsky. The two young men were passionate about music and often gathered to play together. This resulted in the recording of Nautilus Pompilius's first album Pereyezd (Relocation) in 1982, which met with little success. In the same year, Butusov met the poet Ilya Kormiltsev. Together, they recorded the band's first mature album, Nevidimka (Invisible) in 1985. Next year their tandem released the record Razluka (Separation), which sparked the band's popularity. The band's last album, Yablokitai, was recorded by Butusov and Kormiltsev in 1996 in England.

=== 1997–present: Solo career ===
After Nautilus Pompilius disbanded, Butusov launched his solo career. In 1997, he recorded Nezakonnopozhdenniy AlKhimik doktor faust pernatiy zmey with Yuri Kasparyan, and in 1998, his first solo album, Ovaly. During this years he also had a brief cameo in Russian crime film Brother. In the 2020s, Butusov turned to classical music. He is composing the score for the theatrical piece "Two Tsars", based on the play by Boris Akunin, and is writing a libretto for the symphony project "Lament of Adam".

In July 2022, he was denied entry from Finland for practically supporting Russia's invasion of Ukraine and canceled his live appearances in the country.

In November 2022, Butusov composed the soundtrack for the Russian documentary Holy Archipelago, about the famous Solovetsky Monastery.

=== 2001–2017: U-Piter ===
In 2001 Vyacheslav Butusov founded the band U-Piter with former Kino guitarist Yuri Kasparyan. They have recorded seven albums, the last being Gudgora in 2015. U-Piter was disbanded in 2017.

=== 2017–Present: Orden Slavy ===
After the dissolution of U-Piter, Butusov founded his project "Orden Slavy" with Vyacheslav Suori (guitar), Ruslan Gadzhiev (bass) and drummer Denis Marinkin, who had formerly played with artists such as Zemfira and Peter Nalitch. They released their first album in November 2019, Alleluia. In recent years, Butusov's Orthodox Christian faith has informed much of his work—in sharp contrast to the rest of his rock-based discography, as acknowledged by critics. In 2025 they released their latest album, Mertvets.

== Personal life ==
Butusov is married to Anzhelika Estoyeva (born 1970). He has four children: three daughters – Anna (born 1980; with his first wife Mariana Dobrovolskiy-Butusova), Ksenia (born 1991), Sofya (born 1999) and a son Daniil (born 2005).

== Discography ==
=== Solo albums ===
- Ovaly (1998)
- Tikhe igry (2001)
- Model dlya sborki (2008)

=== Collaboration albums ===
- Most (1985) (with Yevgeniy Dimov as part of the project "Step")
- NezakonNoRozhdenniy AlKhimik doktor Faust — Pernatiy Zmey (1997) (with Yuri Kasparyan)
- Elizobarra-Torr (2000) (with Deadушки)
- Zvyodzdniy padl (2001) (with musicians of Kino)

=== Film soundtracks ===
- Brother (1997)
- Brother 2 (2000)
- War (2002)
- Dead Man's Bluff (2005)
- Igla remix (2010)
- Holy Archipelago (2022)
- At the Edge of the Abyss (2024)

== Filmography ==
Title	Year	Role	Notes
It was another time before	1987	Himself	Cameo
Mirror for a Hero	1987	Himself	Cameo
Rock in Russia	1988	Himself	Cameo
Sickle and Guitar	1988	Non-specified	
Nastya and Yegor	1989	Himself	Cameo
Sleeping Car	1989	Passenger SV	
Brother	1997	Himself	Cameo
Aleksandr Bashlachev. Deadly Flight	2005	Himself	Cameo
Oil day	2008	Himself	Cameo
There will be no different us	2021	Himself	

== Publications ==
- Virgostan (2007)
- Antidepressant (M., Eksmo, 2007) (Co-authored with Nikolay Yakimchuk)
- Arkhiya (2011)

== Awards ==
- Lenin Komsomol Prize (1989) for his songs with Nautilus Pompilius
- Golden Gramophone Award (2004) for his song "City Girl"
- Tsarskoselskaya Khudozhestvennaya Prize (2007)
- Medal "15 years of Kemerovo and Novokuznetsk diocese" (26 March 2009)
- Order "For Merit to the Fatherland" (13 October 2011) Order IV. For his contribution in the development in music, art, and many years of creative activity.
