= Time is money (aphorism) =

Aphorism

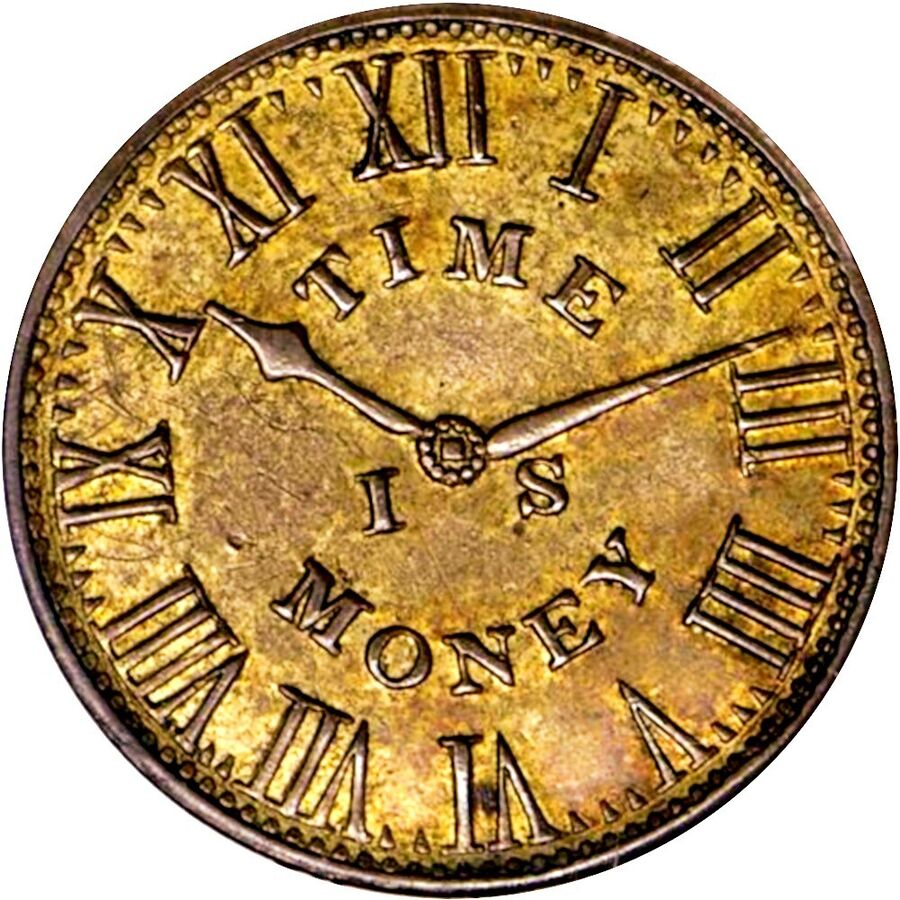
An 1837 clock-themed token coin with the phrase "Time is money" inscribed

"Time is money" is an aphorism that is claimed to have originated in "Advice to a Young Tradesman", an essay by Benjamin Franklin that appeared in George Fisher's 1748 book, The American Instructor: or Young Man's Best Companion, in which Franklin wrote, "Remember that time is money."

"Remember that time is money. He that can earn ten shillings a day by his labour, and goes abroad, or sits idle one half of that day, though he spends but sixpence during his diversion or idleness, it ought not to be reckoned the only expence; [sic] he hath really spent or thrown away five shillings besides."

However, the phrase was already in print in 1719 in the Whig newspaper The Free-Thinker: "In vain did his Wife inculcate to him, That Time is Money ..."

The saying is intended to convey the monetary cost of laziness, by pointing out that when one is paid for the amount of time one spends working, minimizing non-working time also minimizes the amount of money that is lost to other pursuits.

Outside of a purely pecuniary context, similar sentiments about time spent have been expressed since time immemorial, such as the famous essay De Brevitate Vitae by Seneca the Younger.

== See also ==
- Time management
- The Wealth of Nations
- Protestant work ethic
