= Nautilus Pompilius (band) =

Soviet, and later Russian, rock band

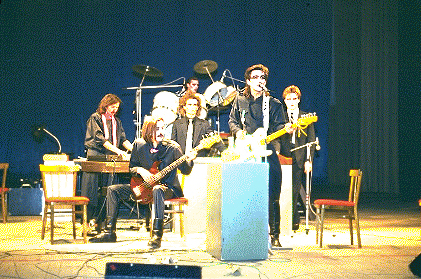
- Nautilus Pompilius in concert, late 1980s.

Background information
- Origin: Soviet Union; Russia
- Genres: Art rock, post-punk, new wave, gothic rock, alternative rock
- Years active: 1982–1988; 1990–1997; 2003–2004; 2013–2014
- Past members: Vyacheslav Butusov; Dmitry Umetsky; Ilya Kormiltsev; Aleksey Mogilevsky; Nikolay Petrov; Albert Potapkin; Andrey Sadnov; Igor Goncharov; Aleksandr Zarubin; Anastasiya Poleva; Viktor Komarov; Vladimir Nazimov; Aleksey Khomenko; Yegor Belkin; Vladimir Yelizarov; Igor Dzhavad-Zade; Aleksandr Belyayev

Nautilus Pompilius (Russian: Наутилус Помпилиус), sometimes nicknamed Nau (Russian: Нау), was a Soviet and Russian rock band. It was founded in Sverdlovsk in 1982 by Vyacheslav Butusov and Dmitry Umetsky. Butusov disbanded the group in 1997, after multiple albums and several different line-ups of the band.

== Name ==
The band was originally named "Ali-Baba and the Forty Thieves" (Russian: "Али-Баба и сорок разбойников"). In 1983, at the suggestion of the band's sound director, Andrei Makarov, the band's name was changed to Nautilus. In 1985, under the initiative of Ilya Kormiltsev, the name was lengthened to Nautilus Pompilius to avoid confusion with other Russian rock bands that were also named Nautilus at the time, such as the Moscow group led by Evgeny Margulis.

The band later elaborated on the name, saying "The band is named after the nudibranch mollusc, which is naturally beautiful and charming." Nautilus pompilius is the scientific name of a species of cephalopod (mistakenly called a nudibranch by the band) commonly known as the Chambered Nautilus.

== History ==
=== Founding ===
Vyacheslav Butusov and Dmitry Umetsky took the first steps towards forming Nautilus in the late 70s. At first, the band performed at small events, covering songs by foreign performers and famous native performers like Mashina Vremeni and Voskreseniye. The band was formed by Butusov and Umetsky.

In 1982, the group made its first attempts to record its own songs. The band's first album, Pereyezd (Russian: Переезд), was released in 1983. The album was strongly influenced by Led Zeppelin.

=== Later ===
The band was active in various incarnations from 1983 to 1997. Since the group disbanded, Vyacheslav Butusov has launched a solo career.

== Discography ==
Year	Russian name	English transliteration (translation)
1983	Переезд	Pereyezd (Resettlement (or Highway Crossing))
1985	Невидимка	Nevidimka (The Invisible One)
1986	Разлука	Razluka (Separation), a name of a Russian folk song featuring in the album
1987–1988	Ни Кому Ни Кабельность (LIVE)	Ni Komu Ni Kabel'nost' (pun; nekommunikabel'nost' means 'lack of sociability' (a loanword, from communicate and -able-) and nikomu ni means 'to nobody'
1988	Князь Тишины	Knyaz' Tishiny (Prince of Silence), after a poem by Endre Ady
1988	Отбой (LIVE)	Otboy (Lights-out)
1989 (first publishing in 1995)	Человек без имени	Chelovek Bez Imeni (Man With No Name)
1990	Наугад (Родившийся в эту ночь)	Naugad (Rodivshiisya v etu noch) (At random (Born at this night))
1992	Чужая земля	Chuzhaya Zemlya (Foreign Land)
1994	Титаник	Titanic
1994	Титаник-LIVE	Titanic-LIVE
1995	Крылья	Kryl'ya (Wings)
1996	Лучшие Песни (LIVE)	Luchshie Pesni (Best Songs)
1997	Яблокитай	Yablokitay (China-apple, Dutch etymologization of Russian apel'sin 'orange fruit') Produced By Bill Nelson
1997	Атлантида	Atlantida (Atlantis)
