= Vendetta (Zemfira album) =

Vendetta (Вендетта)

Studio album by Zemfira
- Released: 1 March 2005
- Genres: Rock, experimental, hard rock, trip hop, electronic rock
- Length: 52:18
- Label: Sony Music Studios
- Producer: Zemfira Ramazanova

Zemfira chronology
14 Weeks of Silence (2002)	Vendetta (Вендетта) (2005)	Zemfira.Live (2006)

Vendetta is the fourth studio album by Russian singer Zemfira. It was released on 1 March 2005 and became the singer's first release in a solo capacity. Its recording took place throughout 2004 and 2005 in collaboration with Igor Vdovin, Kogney, Vlad Kreymer, Oleg Pungin and Yuri Tsaler. The initial concept was to create an avant-garde electronic recording, but later Zemfira grew tired of working with sound and added many rock compositions to the album, which were recorded in the last two months of work on the record. Initially, the disc was planned to be titled Neft, but a few days before its release, the singer changed the title.

Vendetta became an experimental recording, one part of which consisted of electronic compositions and the other of rock songs. In terms of genre, the disc also includes hard rock, trip hop, Britpop, disco and synth-pop. Zemfira described its sound as eclectic. Thematically, the album was described as very personal, intimate and frank. Zemfira herself described the record as a "period of misunderstanding" during which she "was searching for something".

Vendetta was positively received by most music critics, who called it Zemfira's second "takeoff" after her debut album. Two successful radio hits were released from the record —Nebomoreoblaka and Progulka— which entered the top five of the Russian radio chart. The single Itogi reached 22nd place in the chart.

Vendetta received the "Rekord" award of 2006 and was recognized as the best-selling disc of 2005 in Russia. The sold circulation, according to various sources, amounts to between 250 and 500 thousand copies. In support of the album, Zemfira performed at the "Maksidrom" festival in 2004 and 2005, and also conducted a concert tour in 2005.

== Background and recording ==
In 2004, Zemfira worked on the soundtrack for the film by Renata Litvinova titled Goddess: How I Fell in Love. At this time, the singer's collaboration with composer and arranger Igor Vdovin began. The artist herself said that she met Vdovin long before their joint work, during her concerts in Saint Petersburg. The first result of the collaboration was the song "Love as Accidental Death", which was included in the film's soundtrack. Describing how the composition was created, Zemfira noted that she had an ambiguous attitude towards this work: "I became interested in how this is done in principle—when Igor gave the harmony, and I only had to write the melody and lyrics. As a result, I would give him a four plus, and myself—a three. In general, I think Igor works better solo", - Zemfira said. Despite the fact that the first experience of collaboration did not satisfy the singer, Igor was subsequently involved in working on the new album. Zemfira explained that before this, Vdovin gave her to listen to his album Gamma and, impressed by what she heard, she said: "Yes, Igor, as soon as I have a song, I'll bring it to you. Yes, I really want to work with you".

The initial idea was to create an avant-garde electronic record, on which Zemfira would perform more as a guest vocalist, but later this concept was abandoned. In an interview with the newspaper Kommersant, Zemfira spoke about the reasons for changing the concept:

All this remained, did not sink into oblivion, those versions of the songs are really not bad, but I do not agree with such an interpretation. From our joint works on the album are those with which both Igor and I agree. We, each separately, are solo performers. And no matter who Igor collaborates with, his own works will be the best. The same I can say about myself.

The singer also noted that she was provoked to change the concept by the fact that rock compositions began to appear. One of the catalysts for their appearance was the album A Long Happy Life by the group Grazhdanskaya Oborona, which Zemfira listened to for several weeks. She called Vdovin and explained the situation to him: "I sat down, thought, called Igor and said: here's the story, it pulled me in this direction. It's hard for me to blame myself for this, I didn't do it on purpose. I didn't do it deliberately, it just coincided... Perhaps because we've been working with Igor for a long time, I started to miss it. So I called my rock comrades from Mumiy Troll — and I think we recorded excellently with them". During an online conference on Lenta.ru, Vdovin said that nevertheless he was satisfied with working with Zemfira. "...We worked excellently. Zemfira is extraordinarily talented and musical. As for the arrangements, I don't know, Zemfira just decided it would be that way, after all, it's her creation", - Igor said.

...I made the master disc four days before the release. Of course, I could have done it even better. But specifically so that I wouldn't have a second or third chance, I set myself a deadline — March 1st. On this record are those first versions of the songs that we managed to make. When I worked on the previous one, it took me two months just to edit individual parts — there, even with a magnifying glass, you won't find a single uneven spot. This time everything was different. Did the musicians play hungover? I leave this take! The task before me was to convey the mood as much as possible. This sloppiness and negligence for me is associated with the word "rock music". I got tired of editing, I wanted to play simply: four people gather in one room, bash it out — and there it is, born out of thin air.

The recording of the album continued right up to the last days before the record's release. In addition to Zemfira, Igor Vdovin, Korney, Yuri Tsaler and Oleg Pungin worked on it. Zemfira noted that she allowed herself many experiments and often argued with the publishers about the recording. By her admission, some songs were made specifically in this key so that they would not be taken on the radio. Zemfira also highlighted that on Vendetta her unique melodic style manifested itself. "...I myself have my own melodic style. These are some moves, chemical reactions in the head, personal ideas about melody, they cannot transform. Handwriting, if you will. And one more important point: I left a lot of vocals that I sang at home and refused to re-record in the studio. I want it that way—and I think I have the right to do so. As for the arrangements, everything should be fine with them. On one hand, Igor is a very strong arranger, on the other hand, Mumiy Troll are very proven artists", - she explained.

Nevertheless, the singer said that in the end she did not manage to create a cohesive concept due to the introduction of rock music into the recording: "In general, there was an idea for a conceptual, complete work, absolutely different from what was before, but it turns out I didn't pull it off". A lot of "home" vocals were used in the recording of the record. The singer also noted that most of the songs were recorded in the studio, but she deliberately did not include these versions. The rock compositions were recorded in the last two months of work on the disc.

According to Zemfira, her fatigue from working with electronic sound played a big role in changing the recording. "In the new songs, I managed to get rid of the excess in the arrangements. The record is quite minimalist, there are completely empty textures. Due to a certain fatigue, I wanted to play simple rock songs so that I wouldn't have to correct a lot," the singer said. Zemfira noted that she does not consider herself the producer of the new album. According to her, many songs were simply played the way the singer's musicians play them at concerts, and the sound engineers and the musicians themselves played a big role in the recording.

== Negotiations with the label and promotion ==
Before the release, for a month, Zemfira negotiated with labels about purchasing the rights to issue the record. In the end, the singer chose REAL Records. In an interview with Kommersant, Zemfira was reproached for starting to work with a company that is part of a structure "which is now in Russia, together with the First Channel and Russian Media Group, forming today's state ideology". To this, Zemfira replied that there are no labels in Russia that are not tied to ideology. In her opinion:

When it came time to profitably place the album, I spent a month in negotiations. Real Records offered the most normal conditions—that's all I know about this company. As for ideology, in this context, everything can now be considered: business, show business, cinema! We started making propaganda films paid for by the state, Personal Number, for example... As an apolitical person, I only think that I made a good deal. We came to an agreement not so much with Real Records as with Konstantin Ernst... I don't know what public opinion says about him, I just know Kostya for six years, and he never asked me for anything that contradicted my principles.

In 2004, the promotion of the release began. On May 20, the song Nebomoreoblaka, recorded in a light electronic arrangement and becoming the first single from the album, was placed on radio stations through the Tophit system. The composition became a radio hit, taking second place in the chart compiled by this company, the Airplay Detection Tophit 100 (also known as the Russian radio chart). In June, Zemfira performed it at the "Maksidrom" festival, where she performed jointly with Korney and musicians from the group Mumiy Troll.

External videos
- Zemfira on the talk show "Five Evenings" (Channel One, March 3, 2005)
- Zemfira "Blues" on the official YouTube channel (dir. Renata Litvinova, 2005)
- Zemfira "Dyshi" (concert in Kharkiv, November 14, 2005)

The second single released was the song Progulka. Zemfira recounted that she initially brought the song to "Russian Radio". "I brought the song 'Promenade' to 'Russian Radio'... I think I can't write simpler. And they didn't take it, that is, they took it for some 'non-format' time. With the wording 'too fashionable'. I laughed for three minutes. Explanations like: we don't work for Moscow and St. Petersburg—our audience is in the village, in the outback. This is so absurd," the singer said. Despite being called "non-format", the song became the second radio hit, taking fifth place in the Russian radio chart. The music video for the composition was shot by Renata Litvinova already in August 2004, although the song entered rotation in December. The collaboration between the two artists continued as a kind of exchange. After recording the soundtrack, Renata Muratovna inquired about the size of the fee, and Zemfira suggested: "...I don't know how much this can cost, but won't you shoot a clip for me? I'll give you a song, you give me a clip." The singer admitted that she was satisfied with the result. Litvinova also directed the videos for the songs Blues, Samolet, Itogi. For the promotion of the album, two more singles were released: Itogi in a special radio version and Tak i ostavim (We'd leave it this way). Itogi reached 22nd place in the chart, while "So We'll Leave It" reached only 148th.

Starting in 2005, Zemfira undertook a concert tour in support of Vendetta. Even before the release, the singer announced that she did not plan large-scale tours, since she did not have a permanent band lineup and wanted "to stretch the pleasure"; moreover, she did not experience financial difficulties and could "not stoop to chasing because of money".

The tour started on May 10 with a concert in Petrozavodsk. It was notable in that it took place exactly six years after the release of the debut record. "Light, roar, ear-cutting sounds of a megaphone, screams, excitement, the crowd surged to storm the fence, which was not adapted to such an attack," a Fuzz journalist described the beginning of the performance. He compared the singer's movements to the manner of Dave Gahan, and also recounted how, before performing the song Skandal, she appeared with a large pink balloon and declared: "How do you like this? This is my new head." In honor of the recently passed Victory Day, Ramazanova sang the song Dark Night".

With the new program and an updated lineup consisting of session musicians Boris Lifshits (drums), Andrey Zvonkov (guitar), and Vladimir Korinenko (bass guitar), Zemfira visited a number of cities in the near and far abroad. The group also toured with a DJ, since "most of the songs from the new disc Vendetta contain electronic inserts". In addition to solo concerts, Zemfira performed at music festivals. On May 21, Zemfira took part in "Maksidrom", where she performed a half-hour set consisting of songs from the album. As a year earlier, Zemfira opened the performance with the song Nebomoreoblaka, but in a new, "heavy" arrangement. On June 26, an electronic set was scheduled at MegaHouse in Luzhniki, but the singer canceled it, although she appeared at the event to perform Progulka. On July 24, she performed at the closing of the Krylya festival.

The concert in Saint Petersburg took place only on November 5; during it, Zemfira performed the song by The Beatles Let It Be. The tour's final point was the concert on December 23 in Moscow at DK Gorbunova; jazz musician Anatoly Gerasimov participated in it, playing flute on the songs Prosti Menya, Moya Lyubov and Sinoptik. That day, the singer made her first stage dive into the crowd. The material recorded during this tour was released on the album "Zemfira.Live", which, according to Boris Barabanov, captured "the short existence of one of the most powerful concert lineups in domestic rock 'n' roll".

== Title and release ==
In an interview on the radio program "Argentum" on the radio station "Echo of Moscow", Zemfira said that the working title of the album for six months was Neft, but literally a few days before the release, the singer heard the word "vendetta" in the film "True Romance" and decided to change the title. According to her, if the title had not "come" to her, she would have kept the previous one, but she likes the word "vendetta" more. She described it as "beautiful and strong" and noted that it fits the record better. The singer also added: "...I wrote 'Zemfira. Vendetta' next to it, and these two words—they work on each other, it seems to me". Maksim Kononenko asked the singer in an interview why she chose such a "bloody" title for the record. Zemfira argued that such an interpretation of the word "vendetta" is related to its polysemous meaning, among which is the concept of "blood feud". The artist herself prefers the translation of the word as "retribution".

Zemfira also said on the program "Argentum" that she wrote the press release for the disc herself, in which she began to refer to herself as a solo performer. "So, this album was released by me for the first time as a solo performer, because there is no group anymore. I made a principled decision that from now on I will refer to myself as a solo performer. The album includes 15 songs, two of which are in the bonus track category, respectively, 13 programmatic ones. The songs were written and recorded by me over the course of a year," the performer explained.

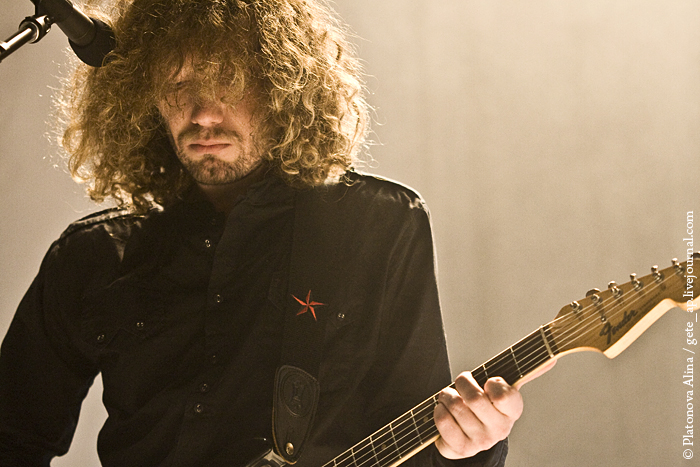
Yuri Tsaler ("Mumiy Troll") performed the guitar parts on the album and performed with Zemfira at its presentation

On March 1, the release of Vendetta and its presentation took place in Moscow, at the Art-Play gallery. After holding a press conference, the singer appeared on stage with a megaphone in her hands to the sounds of a weighted version of Nebomoreoblaka. She performed ten new songs from the album. Boris Barabanov from Kommersant wrote that "after Nebo Zemfira sang the composition Dyshi with a fragment of Every Breath You Take by The Police, as well as the hard rock Malysh, the lyrical Drug, the hit 'Promenade', the sad Samolety, the un-Russian rock and roll Dai Mne Ruku, the suicidal post-punk-surf Povesitsa (as on the CD cover), the disco Raznye and the blues Blues". A cover version of the song Creep by Radiohead and a set of past hits (at the public's insistence) were also performed. The performance was accompanied by a video montage featuring Alla Pugacheva singing at the "Song of the Year" festival, and officials shown on Russia's Channel One television.

== Themes ==
Zemfira herself only said that Vendetta is more built on the mood of the songs, which she tried to preserve as much as possible during recording. Critics later called the album very personal and frank. On Music.com.ua, it was noted that "Zemfira remains a master of piercing lyrical revelations, only they have matured a bit, softened, shed the thorns of categoricity, and sprouted with warmer intonations. Newly thoughtful, focused, drinking every state to the bottom, exploring stylistic and emotional extremes—this is how Zemfira appears". Sonya Sokolova wrote that upon analyzing the song lyrics, one can conclude that the leitmotif of the work is the theme of parting. "This entire album is about farewell, departure, parting without regret," the journalist believed. On Km.ru, it was noted that on this disc Zemfira began to write more frankly than ever, "she opened and turned her soul inside out, showed what she lives by, whom she loves, and whom she hates". The publication wrote: "Vendetta is a novel about human life, in which every song is alive, every song breathes and makes one experience someone else's life, someone else's pain anew each time. Her life and her pain". According to Michael Baev from the magazine Fuzz, on Vendetta Zemfira reached "the limits of self-immersion".

Vendetta is fifteen stories about the periphery. About geographical periphery, about mental periphery, about intellectual periphery. Zemfira is somewhere on the side, she just tells about herself, and the shockingly simple world of one of the country's main pop stars turns out to be absolutely indistinguishable from the world of any yesterday's schoolboy, current student, tomorrow's loser, sequentially and inevitably heading towards midlife crisis, quiet alcoholism, divorce, cop/anti-biotic serials, battered "Zhigulis" and reflections on what a scoundrel this Abramovich is…

— Maksim Kononenko in his column on GZT.ru writes about the album's theme.

Aleksey Vishnya believed that on Vendetta the singer's gift for speaking the same language as her generation was revealed. "Sex, drugs and death, parting drowned in blue ink—wonderful sources of inspiration. The entire album is imbued with hatred, nervous caprice hangs in the air like an axe," Aleksey noted. Anton Martsinkevich on Krasland.ru spoke about the fact that the disc turned out very intimate. In his opinion, "all tracks impress with their intimacy, as if Zemfira recorded the songs on a cassette and gave it to her boyfriend or girlfriend to listen to. She notices nothing around her and at the same time picks up all the details of what is happening here. Essentially, she doesn't care deeply about those who will listen to this record, and especially about the opinions of these very people. An undoubtedly genius feature—to create like this without noticing anything".

The song Nebomoreoblaka was called "pseudo-social". Dmitry Yakushev in "Left.ru" wrote about the song: "Zemfira does not pronounce manifestos, does not denounce, does not call for revolutions, she, as befits a true artist, draws an image that speaks about the world we live in more clearly and convincingly than any slogans." The author also noted that the main message of the song is directed against the existing orders of show business, and the mention of the singer Valeria in the song was a collective image, as Zemfira herself repeatedly stated in interviews: "Simply, when the song was being written, the singer Valeria was being advertised especially widely and intrusively," Yakushev noted. Zemfira said that although these lines would probably be considered a "vendetta" towards Valeria, she herself does not have such feelings towards the singer. In Progulka the singer turns to "defenseless-naturalistic revelations," using the phrase "my knees are frozen." On Km.ru they wrote that "every girl has experienced this sensation, but none has yet thought to clothe this experience in such an unpretentious form".

After the release of the album Spasibo Zemfira linked its theme to the record Vendetta. According to the artist, "if Vendetta was restless, I was searching for something, then here—I found it. The connection between these albums is like between the Queen albums A Day at the Races and A Night at the Opera. Period of misunderstanding—period of understanding".

== Music and lyrics ==
Zemfira herself called the album eclectic in sound. In an interview with Russian Newsweek, the artist said about the musical diversity of the record: "A motley album. Many styles—the guardians of genre purity will scold. Archaic rock, even blues and electronic arrangements. I am a person of broad views—I wanted it that way". Boris Barabanov wrote that the easiest way to call the album rock, since "the sound of guitars has indeed never been so heavy and pompous on her records before." Nevertheless, after listening, the critic noted that only four songs are performed in a rock key ("Nebomoreoblaka", "Give Me Your Hand", "Baby" and "Hangwoman"). On the other hand, he believed that "with the same success, the record can be described as a collection of 'sad lyrical pieces,' occasionally interrupted by rock and rolls". Konstantin Bakanov from Novye Izvestia noted that the album emphasizes music and that it demonstrates musical diversity, unpredictability, and "matured" themes in the lyrics. Aleksey Mazhaev in Muzikalnaya Pravda, in turn, wrote that Vendetta is a kind of puzzle that "everyone can assemble themselves from beautiful motifs, heartfelt poems, electronic sounds alternating with heavy rock". Sergey Stepanov from Rol.ru claimed that "Zemfira scatters allusions and hyperlinks more readily than usual, so it gets to the point of ridiculousness: the album alternately hosts a melody from The Police, a drum loop from Radiohead, and a guitar riff named, God forbid, Foo Fighters".

About the lyrics of the album's songs, Zemfira said in an interview with Toppop.ru that she cannot describe them: "It's hard for me to talk about the lyrics. I can still reflect on the music—there's blues, there's electronics, but with lyrics it's more complicated: you say whatever you want. There's no slang on this album". In an interview with Fuzz, the singer clarified that the lyrics of her songs have become more concise. She noted that there is a tendency towards conciseness, since she does not like excess either in music or in text. Zemfira clarified that she does not like lyrics built on "endless adjectives" and considers it "water." "And it's very difficult sometimes to get to the essence through these adjectives. You push through, come out to some tree—and it's bald, there's nothing there. What is most significant for me in the text? Of course, the mood. And in music too," the artist said.

In an interview with the Zvuki.ru portal, the singer said that one of the songs on the album contains a quote from Led Zeppelin, but did not specify which one (Zemfira had previously used a riff from the band in the song "Traffic"). "Of course, I listen to the album before it goes out into the world, and more than once. Moreover, it features another quote from 'Led Zeppelin'! It's no secret, although it's much more modest and fits very harmoniously into the arrangement. This is the only deliberate quote, and I undoubtedly knew what I meant when I included it. Some reference to that composition, to that song, to that mood, to those words," Zemfira said.

NebomoreoblakaThe song was originally recorded with light electronic processing and released on the radio, but for the album, a different arrangement was made. Zemfira explained:

…I was looking for an arrangement for this song for a long time, this composition has many arrangements, there are completely electronic ones, by the way, what you call remixes. And about a month ago, I discovered this arrangement, we did it very quickly. I think it turned out well, because I'll open concerts with it, it opens the disc—it's convenient in every sense.

Aleksey Mazhaev noted that the song opens with "straightforward hard rock sounds". Kapitolina Delovaya wrote that not a trace of the original version of the song remained on the album, and the new arrangement reminds of Korn, Nine Inch Nails and Rammstein. "For the 'messianic' song, they tried on many 'hats'—the most appropriate turned out to be the alternative sound welded by Tsaler—Pungin," Kapitolina clarified. The song also has the line: "My mom and dad have long turned into televisions." Zemfira said that her mother took the lyrics calmly: "Mom has nothing against this line, moreover, she positions herself that way, that 'you know, I'm always on TV!' That's it". Evgenia Pishchikova drew attention to the similarity with the title of the film Sky. Plane. A girl. and the closeness of their ideas, which consists in "the conflict between the singer and the crowd, the double life of a gifted person".

Dyshi: was recorded with "live" drums (Oleg Pungin), guitar and bass (Kornei) and Moog (Zemfira). Aleksey Mazhaev considered that the song starts with an overly monotonous verse, but "from the words 'and don't hold me, I know all your tricks' follows a piece of the most beautiful melody". On Apelzin.ru, it was noted that the composition reminds of "V Reys" by Mumiy Troll, "only Comrade Lagutenko was flying somewhere, and Comrade Zemfira is arriving." It was also said that the song's line "your analyst is just a bitch" is the most memorable on the album. Overall, the song was described as "a collection of inconsistencies. The direct message 'I'll come back anyway' and, to top it off, an Interpol-style interlude".

Itogi Aleksey Mazhaev wrote that in "Itogi" "on the electronic frame created with the help of Vlad Kreymer, a text so precise and touching is strung that the experimental nature of the sound recedes into the background: 'I'm leaving, leaving mountains of cigarette butts, kilometers of days, millions of idiots…'". Kornei performed the guitar, bass guitar and Mellotron parts in the song. He and Vlad Kreymer were also responsible for the arrangement and programming. Kapitolina Delovaya characterized the composition as a "light" track, under which "you want to smile, dance and reach up…" It was noted that the song is "played in the rhythm of an energetic walk". The theme of the song's lyrics was highlighted as one of the most mature on the album: "The hooligan and 'scandal girl' noticeably matures and draws certain conclusions (see the track title). The text is maximally honest, maximally reflecting the past, present, future".

Tak i Ostavim is a guitar ballad and the first of three songs created jointly with Igor Vdovin. Kapitolina Delovaya called the song a "guitar-electronic rhapsody of incredible beauty and power." According to her, while listening, there is a feeling that "before you in a few minutes the Universe unfolds and folds up". It was also noted that the guitar in the song refers to the works of Naik Borzov, and at the end there are vocal allusions to Radiohead. The song has no chorus as such, but it was replaced by an "incredible Britpop vocalise".

Samolet was described as "a stream of consciousness, a melancholic murmur, someone else's revelations that you can listen to, or not listen to, but you can't escape them". Zemfira composed the text of the song on a plane from Moscow to Kyiv in three minutes, during which the flight attendant was giving safety instructions to the passengers. The song also features harp (the part was recorded by Valentina Borisova). The lyrics include lines similar to literary classics: "A sail turns white lonely, fool". Aleksey Munipov wrote that "Samolet" is "one continuous feverish line, broken by an asthenic rhythm". Alexander Belyaev in the publication Vremya Novostey wrote that the song reminded him of "rarefied minimalist avant-pop in the spirit of Björk".

Day Mne Ruku (Ya Pozhmu Ey)"In the song, the emphasis on sound is given to the rock and roll guitar (Kornei). The work was called very "stadium-like," and it was also noted that "the piece seems exaggeratedly cheeky for this album." Nevertheless, the song included lyrical, "slowed down, insinuating fragments". According to Semyon Kvasha's expression, in it Zemfira "sends regards to Zhanna Aguzarova". Zemfira described the song as "very concert-like." By her admission, originally she did not want to include the song in the album, but she had long been thinking "about such a brazen riff, called 'in the face.'" The artist clarified: "I latched onto this riff and quickly wrote the lyrics. Perhaps the presence of such songs suggests that I missed concerts".

Blues In an interview with Guru Ken, Zemfira mentioned that the song is her first blues and it is made according to all the canons of the genre:

I, in principle, never liked them [blues songs]. Even in college, they made us all listen to them, play them. There are some traditional blues forms, twelve-bar, minor, major… I didn't like it precisely for its traditionalism. But, probably, something accumulated in me—and the first blues in my life came out. I wanted to make it as archaic as possible, with an old drum sound…

The song is recorded in the key of F minor, in time signature 2/4. The melody is performed with blues intonations. The main chord progression: Fm – Fm/Eb – Db – Eb. Aleksey Mazhaev considered that in terms of arrangement, the song turned out almost bluesy, but melodically it reminds of the composition "Infinity" from the album Fourteen Weeks of Silence. Kapitolina Delovaya noted that the song is still an atypical blues. She noted the connection of "Blues" with Zemfira's song "London Sky," as well as the fact that the composition shows the wide range of the singer's voice. Alexander Belyaev noted that the keyboard part in the song was performed by jazz musician Ivan Farmakovsky.

Progulka is an electronic, dance composition. The arrangement and programming of the song were done by Igor Vdovin. Zemfira herself attributed the song to the pop genre and added regarding the arrangement: "I like this version. It's completely unforced, and I think there are beautiful electronic violin sounds. I think this is an appropriate version". In an interview with the Timeout.ru website, the singer said that the song is positive in mood, but overall it does not reflect the mood of the entire album.

Drug is performed as an electronic ballad, in the opinion of Aleksey Mazhaev, more reminiscent of an electronic romance. Kapitolina Delovaya described the song as "an electronic ballad of light and pure sadness. Actually: Zemfira plus Kornei (creative-computer tandem)". Igor Vdovin also worked on the song. The programming was done by Zemfira, Kornei and Vdovin. On Apelzin.ru, the composition was described as "an electronic saga in the form of a plea to a mythical friend whom the singer calls to return".

Zhuzha was recorded with acoustic guitar, strings (Zemfira), VST-bass, Mellotron, guitar and electronic drums (Kornei). Sonya Sokolova on Zvuki.ru wrote that the piece "shows a very sad, very distant, beautiful electronic picture: this song brings air and space". Aleksey Mazhaev noted that the song includes several "pairs of delightful rhymes and images," such as: "we dissolve each other, Zhuzha, like acid or worse".

Malysh was considered that the song is made in the style of the "old" Zemfira. The composition uses heavy, hard rock guitar (Yuri Tsaler) and live drums (Oleg Pungin). Aleksey Mazhaev claimed that here Zemfira "skillfully transitions again from chopped hard rock to musical phrases of heavenly beauty".

Povesitsa is a rock composition, described as a programmatic statement with the line "Lantern, rope, ladder." The choruses were called marching.

Krasota is the basis of the song is piano and strings parts. Aleksey Mazhaev noted that Krasota echoes Samolet, only here there are few words, but a lot of almost chamber music: the interplay of piano with electronic keyboards is remarkable". On Apelzin.ru, the song was considered a reference to the "trip-hop Portishead" and its mood of "light sadness" was noted. "One single rain-blurred phrase against the background of melancholically flickering keys," they wrote about the song on Music.com.ua.

Raznye (Vse Takiye): about this bonus track that goes first in the list, Zemfira said that it is a "joke song". To the question why such a "light and fun" composition was included in the album only as a bonus track, the singer replied that "it could be, or it could not be". According to Denis Stupnikov, in it the musician expresses contempt for "petty spiritual demands of our contemporaries". On Km.ru, it was noted that the song is characterized by the "principle of indifferent cataloging," known from the works of Vasily Shumov (from the group Tsentr), as well as inherent in Boshetunmai by Viktor Tsoi. "In the 80s, these performers rhymed everything in a row, trying to create a comprehensive slice of objective reality. Zemfira uses the same method, drawing a generalized portrait of our contemporary," the publication wrote. It was also noted that the song features "a combination of bass solo with keyboards à la the soundtrack to the film Igla in the interlude".

Jim Beam: is a re-recorded old composition by Zemfira from 1997. Kapitolina wrote about the song: "Want to see Zemfira at the very beginning? Even before she was hooked on guitars and the rockapops messages of the first album were defined? Ufa, 97th year, 20-year-old Zemfira and a computer, one on one. And let no one now do something barely comparable… it's hardly childish, but touching to the point of impossibility".

=== Professional criticism ===
Andrey Bukharin in the magazine Rolling Stone gave Vendetta four stars and called it "a fairly serious work, for the first time unlike what Zemfira did before." The critic approved of her decision to change the concept, since "Vdovin is not William Orbit, and Zemfira is not Madonna." In his opinion, although the singer worked on an unusual sound, the album is not "particularly experimental". Boris Barabanov in the newspaper Kommersant also gave a positive assessment to the album. According to him, the record sounds incredibly fresh and Zemfira on it "boldly moves across all formats." The journalist considered the work very harmonious: "Zemfira's album is a vivid example of a musical product brought to absolute perfection, a thing in which there is practically nothing random either at the level of ideas or at the level of performance. Complete symmetry. No one to put next to it". Maksim Semelyak from the magazine Afisha wrote that the record sounds perfect. "As soon as she starts singing—the very thought of imprecise arrangements disappears, like a servant caught stealing, not even demoted. Her songs are almost impossible to spoil—so clear and substantively perfect is their message," the author noted. Alexander Gorbachev, summing up the musical year for the online newspaper Grani.ru, called Vendetta "a collection of the most precise songs, polished to the last echo, about the eternal and the most pressing at the same time" and added: "Zemfira has never sounded so true, so smart, so relevant".

Sergey Stepanov from Rol.ru spoke about the album that "now you can stop being shy—and admit to yourself that in a professional sense Zemfira is not just the most gifted of her compatriots, but a figure of the rank of Kate Bush or Björk, a vocalist from God and a poetess from the devil. Secondly, Russian rock (or pop, or folk) last heard something like this—so impeccable, so complete—in the late 80s: mature Nautilus, later Kino". He also commented on Zemfira's statement that critics would hate her for this album: "The record is positively obliged to reconcile the listener with the consumer, the good music critic with the bad one, and her author's fee with the budgets of the releasing company". Aleksey Mazhaev in the publication Muzikalnaya Pravda wrote that the album has no direct effect. "It opens gradually, with different facets and different tracks. If some compositions of the album appealed to you more than others, there are no guarantees that the ones that didn't appeal (seemingly) won't start spinning in your head on their own at some point. Perhaps this is even cooler than Zemfira's debut, which made you fall in love with it immediately and unconditionally," the reviewer noted. He also wrote a review in the magazine Play, in which he called Vendetta "the return of the main singer" and noted the "stylistic diversity" of the work.

Ivanov-Nozhikov from NewsLab.ru noted that the album turned out eclectic, but in reality this makes no difference. In his opinion, "it doesn't matter what sound Zemfira dresses her songs in, what matters is that they always retain that emotional hook because of which you'll wear out this album too, and you'll desperately wait for the next one. It has been preserved on Vendetta too. Whether this is her best album or not—does it matter?" Konstantin Bakanov from Novye Izvestia gave a mixed assessment to the album, noting that the emphasis here was on music, which received more attention than the lyrics. He writes that "there is a bit less of the notorious 'nerves' that made the country shiver and some girls fall into a trance. More lyrics. However, the album is very successful overall. Musical diversity, unpredictability, 'matured' themes... She remained an independent musician, but to do so she had to experiment a bit more, and at the same time disband two lineups of her own band".

Kapitolina Delovaya in Moskovskij Komsomolets gave a positive assessment to the album. At the end of the article, the journalist wrote: "Finally, advice for the first listening to Vendetta. Play this album at night and alone—if you. So as not to be embarrassed by involuntary reactions of the soul". The site Apelzin.ru also described the album positively. In the publication, calling the record "post-postmodern," they called it a masterpiece. The Ukrainian portal Music.com.ua also received positive reviews for the album (9 points out of 10). On the site, the record was called avant-garde, noting the perfection of the sound. "Once Alexander Vasiliev, the leader of the group Splean, shared his recipe for a successful song—it is when goosebumps run down your spine. In that case, Vendetta is a whole anthill. Almost all 15 songs, except perhaps two or three, draw the listener into a magical labyrinth, in which around every corner a new and unexpected angle opens, captivating further and further, forcing to go all the way," the publication described the record. Dmitry Bezkorovayny from the Belarusian publication BelGazeta called the record a bold work and gave it a score of five out of five. In his opinion, with this album Zemfira will lose part of her audience, but "will definitely gain enough new ones that will allow her to have sufficient creative freedom in the future. A kind of healthy cleansing of the listening audience in favor of those who are really interested in music".

On the site Km.ru, two reviews of the album were presented: a female and a male perspective on the record. The male review turned out to be mixed. It was noted that the album does not draw into its space, but only allows one to admire the songs from the side. The songs "Itogi", Progulka and the compositions included in the bonus were described positively. The female perspective on the record turned out positive. The perfect intonations and good vocals were noted, as well as the fact that each song can be described as a complete musical masterpiece. Aleksey Munipov in Izvestia wrote that if the previous album Fourteen Weeks of Silence was introverted and restrained, then "Vendetta, on the other hand, thunders with hits like firecrackers, weighty guitar riffs, catchy vocalises—this is a very energetic, spring record, full of free gifts to radio stations and sincere feelings rolled into sonorous phonemes. Sad and light—that's what you could always say about Zemfira's songs, but now tenderness and delight have been added. And some serious toughness that suits Zemfira very well".

Svetlana Shagina in the magazine Fuzz noted that the album can be described in three words: feminine, adult, and experimental. "Whining blues, hard rock and something like electronics—everything will be perceived with a grateful bow. The voice and lyrics self-sufficiently carry all these musical 'experiments' on their own," the author wrote. In the opinion of the editors of the same publication, Vendetta surpassed the previous album and, although it yielded to the debut record, nevertheless was "the most indicative and defining work" of Zemfira, "a kind of summing up".

=== Musicians' opinion ===
Billy Novik, the leader of the group Billy's Band, wrote his own review of the album specifically for the magazine Ogonyok, where he called it a turning point for Russian rock and roll. Novik noted the unique lyrics and called the best line the phrase "even stones roll somewhere." Overall, the musician considered the work from two points of view:

First of all, I am very glad that someone has made a truly high-quality and 'uplifting' album. After Vendetta, I immediately had a number of associations with Western cult singers: Suzanne Vega, Tori Amos… If evaluating the music critically, I must note that I liked the rock line in the album less and the lyrical one more. But, on the other hand, I understand that the album was deliberately built on contrasts. If everything was sustained in one style, it would resemble a 'best songs collection.' Zemfira, however, simultaneously launched several lines: after a punchy action track follows a piercing lyrical ballad—and that's why this music throws me from hot to cold.

Ilya Chert named the album among his favorite records. The musician described it as: "Sincerity. Not everyone can give away their heart in pieces. And this is real longing". The singer Pelageya also named it among her favorites. Andrey Makarevich was impressed by the energy of Vendetta: "And despite the fact that this energy is depressive, it is real, not sucked out of thin air". Timur Ismagilov shared his impressions after listening in his "Diary of a Young Composer"; he characterized the disc as "adult, sad and genius," and also called it a "hard-won precious alloy." He was among those who regretted that the singer abandoned the title "Neft," which, in the composer's opinion, would have had a hidden subtext.

== Commercial success ==
Vendetta was recognized as the best-selling disc of 2005 among Russian performers and won in the "Domestic Album of the Year" nomination at the 2006 "Rekord" award. During the award ceremony, Zemfira commented on the success of the record by phone: "This is the first award for the album. But this is not an assessment of creative achievements, but an assessment of sympathy. I hope that the Real Records company is finally happy. Thank you to my fans!" The exact circulation was not announced, but there are statements that the disc was sold in quantities from 250 to 500 thousand copies. On Timeout.ru, it was reported that its circulation was about 250 thousand copies. Forbes cites figures of 280 thousand copies. In the newspaper Kommersant, it was stated that every record in the "Domestic Album of the Year" nomination at the "Rekord" award exceeded 500 thousand copies in sales. In turn, Mikhail Margolis in Izvestia wrote that Vendetta became the only record of 2005 whose sales exceeded 500 thousand copies.

== Design and artwork ==
The standard edition of the album includes 13 main compositions and two bonus tracks. The first pressing includes standard packaging and mentions in the credits, in addition to Real Records, also "First Music Publishing". The Ukrainian edition is similar to the first Russian pressing. The second pressing of the album differs slightly from the first: the mention of "First Music Publishing" is removed and the disc matrix design is changed. Later, a limited edition of the disc was released, which included two music videos for the songs Progulka and "Blues". This edition was distributed in cardboard packaging (digipak). A special edition with bonus tracks, music videos, and an expanded booklet containing song lyrics was also released. The cover and booklet feature a dedication: "To Little Star".

The album's design was handled by Matvey Evstigneev (Oboz Design Studio). The photographer was Vlad Opelyants. The front cover features a photograph of Zemfira holding her hand against glass. Overlaid are the inscriptions "Vendetta" (in black font) and "Zemfira" (in white font). The cover is executed in a gray-black-brown color scheme. Zemfira told the magazine Fuzz that the cover was made literally before the album's release:

I didn't have time to deal with the design. We did it, I think, in three hours. The previous cover we did in three months. And, looking at these two covers, I understand that the difference, in general, is not great. The design seemed normal to me. What I like most is how the disc itself looks. I wanted it to be black on the other side too—there are CD-Rs that are black on both sides. But, unfortunately, this turned out to be impossible because graphite, or something, eats into the plastic for a week, and we sent the disc to the factory a day before the release. And if it were black on both sides, it would be just a holiday.

== Track listing ==
1. Nebomoreoblaka ("НебоМореОблака", SkySeaClouds), 3:37
2. Dyshi ("Дыши", Breathe), 4:10
3. Itogi ("Итоги", Conslusions), 3:17
4. Tak y ostavim ("Так и оставим", We'd leave it this way), 4:11
5. Samolet ("Самолет", Aeroplane), 2:27
6. Day mne ruku ("Дай мне руку (я пожму ее)", Give me your hand (I will shake it)), 3:32
7. Blyuz ("Блюз", Blues), 3:28
8. Progulka ("Прогулка", Walk), 4:14
9. Drug ("Друг", Friend), 3:21
10. Zhuzha ("Жужа", Zhuzha), 4:51
11. Malysh ("Малыш", Baby), 2:50
12. Povesitsa ("Повесица", Hang myself), 3:48
13. Krasota ("Красота", Beauty), 3:11

Bonus tracks:

1. Razniye (all of us) ("Разные (все такие)", Different (all of us)), 2:56
2. "Jim Beam (Ufa '97)", 2:25

== Team ==
- Zemfira – vocals, Moog (track 2), piano (track 5), Hammond E5 (track 6), Rhodes (track 7), acoustic guitar (track 10), programming (tracks 9, 10, 14, 15), Yamaha strings (track 10), keyboards (track 14), guitar (track 15).
- Oleg Pungin – drums (tracks 1, 2, 6, 11, 12)
- Kornei – bass guitar (tracks 1–4, 6, 7, 11, 12, 14), guitar (tracks 2–7, 9–12, 14), Mellotron (tracks 3 and 10), programming (tracks 3, 5, 9, 10), VST-bass (track 10).
- Yuri Tsaler – guitar (tracks 1, 11, 12)
- Bolshakov – engineer (tracks 1, 2, 5–7, 10–12, 14), mastering
- Denis Yurovsky – assistant engineer (tracks 1, 2, 5–7, 10–12, 14)
- Vlad Kreymer – programming (track 3)
- Valery Cherkesov – mixing engineer (track 3), mixing (tracks 11 and 13)
- Oleg Belov – piano (tracks 4 and 13)
- Igor Vdovin – arrangement (tracks 4, 8, 13), programming (tracks 4, 8, 9, 13)
- Boris Istomin – sound recording (tracks 4, 8, 13), mixing (tracks 4, 8), technical support (tracks 4, 8)
- Alexander Levichkin – technical support (tracks 4 and 8)
- Valentina Borisova – harp (track 5)
- Han – drums (track 7)
- Ivan Farmakovsky – Hammond E5 (track 7)
- Alexander Dedkovsky – trumpet (track 12)
- Vladimir Yunovich – strings (track 13)
- Vladimir Skripakov – director
- Vlad Opelyants – photography
- Matvey Evstigneev – design

== Awards and nominations ==
In 2005, the artist was nominated for several MTV Russia Music Awards, including Best Female Artist (for Blyuz and Progulka), Best Composition (for Progulka), Best Rock Project (for Blyuz and Progulka), and Best Artist. The music video for Blyuz won the award for Best Video.

In 2006, the artist received multiple nominations at the Fuzz Awards, Record Awards, and Muz-TV Awards. At the Fuzz Awards, she was nominated for Best Music Video (for Blyuz and Progulka”), Best Song (for Itogi), and Best Album (for Vendetta). At the Record Awards, Vendetta was named the Domestic Album of the Year, while at the Muz-TV Awards, it was also nominated for Best Album.
