= Zemfira =

Russian rock musician and songwriter (born 1976)

Zemfira Земфира
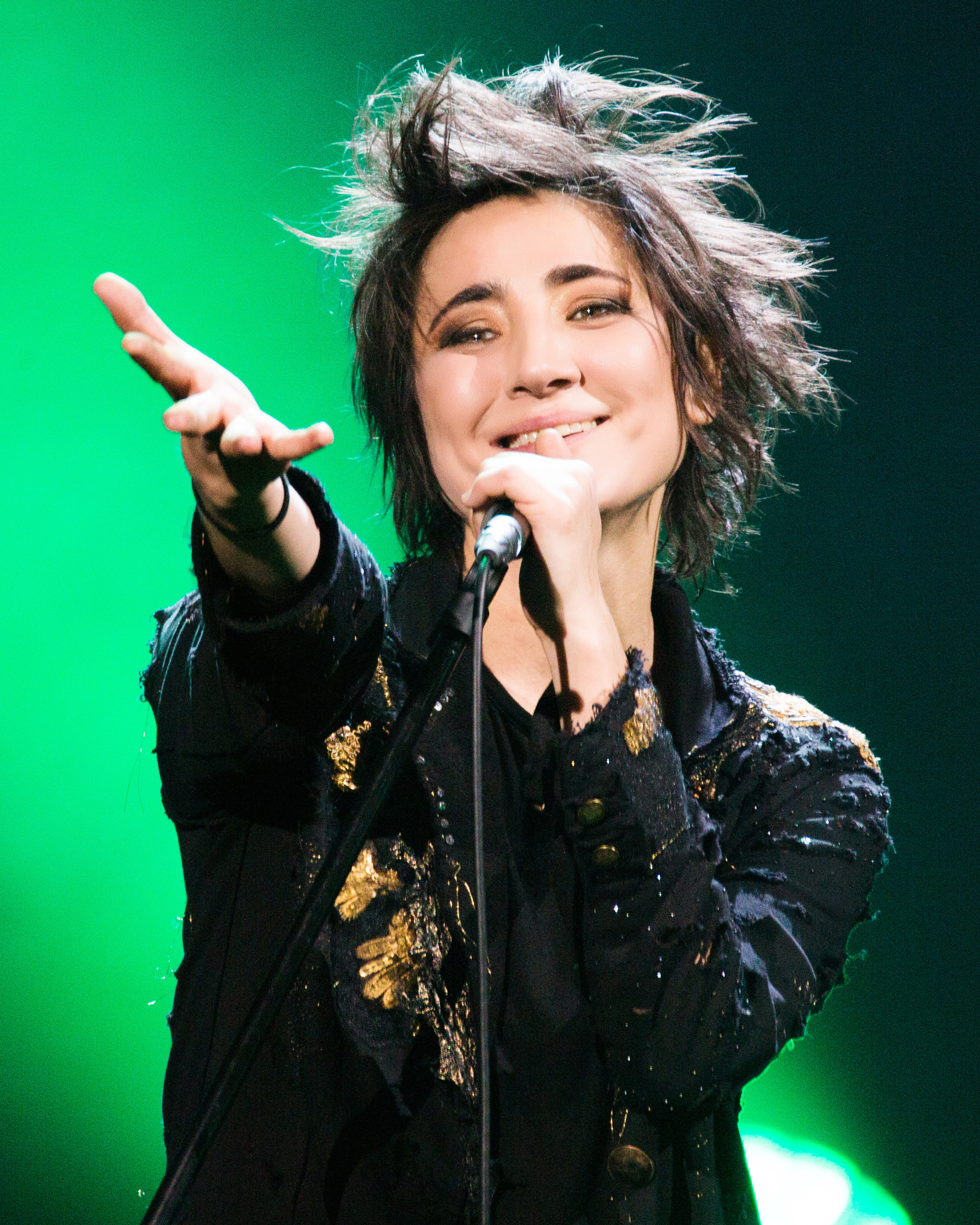
- Zemfira in 2016

Background information
- Born: Zemfira Talgatovna Ramazanova; 26 August 1976 (age 50)
- Origin: Ufa, Russian SFSR, Soviet Union
- Genres: Alternative rock, pop rock, indie rock
- Years active: 1998–present
- Labels: REAL Records, Navigator
- Website: Official website

Zemfira Talgatovna Ramazanova (Russian: Земфира Талгатовна Рамазанова, Tatar: Земфира Тәлгать кызы Рамазанова; born 26 August 1976), mononymously known as Zemfira, is a Russian rock musician. She has been performing since 1998 and has been popular in Russia and other former Soviet republics. To date Zemfira has sold over 3 million records.

== Biography and beginning of career ==
At the age of four, Zemfira became interested in music and entered a music school the following year (where she studied piano performance and voice) and wrote her first song when she was seven years old. Her older brother Ramil introduced her to rock music, which became her real passion – she listened to Black Sabbath, Nazareth and Queen, learning to play the guitar. In the 7th grade, Zemfira split her time between music and basketball, becoming the captain of the Russian Girls' Junior Basketball Team by 1990. She began to lose interest in classical music, preferring instead to hang out with friends in the streets of Ufa and covering songs by Russian rock groups such as Kino, Nautilus Pompilius and Aquarium (who reached the peak of their popularity in the early 1990s).

At the urging of her mother, Zemfira continued with piano studies and graduated music school with honors. In her last year of high school, basketball competed with school work, and the singer abandoned the sport in favour of music. She took the entrance exams for the Ufa College of Fine Arts and was admitted into the second year, studying vocal performance. During college, she performed jazz and rock and roll standards in various local bars and restaurants accompanied by her friend, saxophone player Vlad Kolchin. She graduated with honors, and in 1996 took a job as a sound engineer at the Ufa subsidiary of the radio station Europa Plus.

For the next couple of years Zemfira spent her days making advertisement recordings at the station and her nights on a computer, where she recorded the songs that would later become the singles Why, Snow, and Weatherman. In early 1998, Zemfira invited Rinat Akhmadiyev, Sergei Sozinov, Sergei Mirolyubov, and Vadim Solovyov to join Zemfira. Their first professional gig took place on 19 June 1999 as part of a festival celebrating the anniversary of a local radio station Silver Rain Ufa. Shortly afterwards, Zemfira sent out promo tapes to multiple Moscow producers, one of whom (Leonid Burlakov from Mumiy Troll) was smitten with the material, and invited the band for some sessions in Moscow:

I was living in Ufa and working in restaurants for four years when I got tired of it. I went to the Europa Plus Ufa radio station. Then, I fell in love with computers and took advantage of the opportunity to write songs at night. I learned a couple of music programs and moved forward. I wrote at night, went home in the morning, and listened. After nine months, I had thirty or forty songs. Then, I went to Moscow just to rest and visit. I took these songs with me on CD-R, just in case. My friend liked them and asked me to re-record them. I went to the record company Fili, but they told me that they wouldn't accept CD-Rs; they needed cassettes. So, I left. I didn't go anywhere else because I didn't like it. My girlfriend gave the cassette she had transcribed at Maxidrom to Leonid Burlakov, the producer of Mumiy Troll. Lyonya called me in Ufa the same day. I scraped together just enough money for a ticket to go back to Moscow.

== Career ==
=== 1999–2005 ===
Recording and production work on the debut album took place at Mosfilm Moscow until 10 May 1999, when the debut was finally released. The promotion of Zemfira prior to the release included heavy rotation of singles "AIDS" (СПИД), "Arrivederci" (Aриведерчи), and "Rockets" (Ракеты) as well as the video clips for those songs. The band immediately went on tour, starting a tradition of celebrating their beginnings with a summer concert in Ufa while recording their second album Forgive Me My Love (Прости Меня Моя Любовь). The group enjoyed popularity from the start, in part because of heavy rotation on radio and television, and in part because a female rocker is a fairly rare and unusual concept for the Russian music scene.

The release of PMML (Russian abbreviation for Forgive Me My Love) in March 2000 brought the band immense popularity. "Searching" (Искала) and "Ripe" (Созрела) became instant hits, and the group was invited to headline the festival Maxidrom. Constant touring wore down on the band, and after the release of 14 Weeks of Silence the band took a break.

In September 2004, Zemfira began studies towards a degree in Philosophy at Moscow State University, but after the first semester she took a sabbatical and did not resume her studies thereafter. On 16 October on the MTV Russia Awards show the singer performed "We Are the Champions" together with the rock group Queen.

The fourth studio album, Vendetta, which consists of 15 tracks, was released on 1 March 2005. The recording became a result of Zemfira's collaboration with several musicians: Igor Vdovin, Korney, Vlad Kreymer, Yuri Tsaler and Oleg Pungin. Initially the album was going to be named "Oil", but the title was changed few days before the official release. "Vendetta" got many positive reviews.

=== 2007–2016 ===
On 14 February 2007, a collection of music videos, Zemfira.DVD, was released. It contains all the singer's clips, except AIDS and Traffic.

In May and June 2007, Zemfira embarked on a short concert tour titled 'Déjà Vu', with performances held in smaller venues (clubs and small theatres). The tour culminated with a Moscow performance at the Green Theatre which was filmed by Renata Litvinova. The tour program focused on stylish remakes of the singer's top hits, often reworked in styles such as jazz, ska, bossa nova, and blues. A new album, Thank You (Спасибо), was released at the beginning of October. It is described by Zemfira herself as 'very positive', in contrast to what she terms the 'restlessness' of Vendetta.

The concert movie Green Theatre in Zemfira, which mixes Zemfira's monologues with selected songs shot during her live performance at the open air show in Moscow, was released in several Russian digital movie theatres on 21 February 2008. Later it was also released on DVD and Blu-ray.

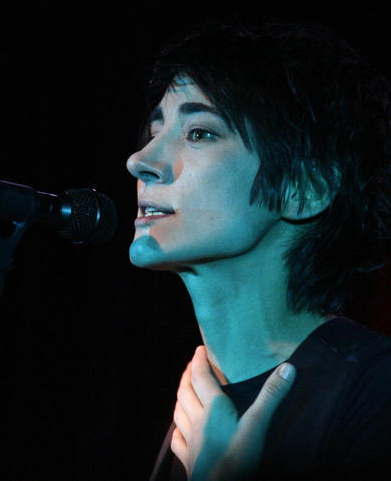
Zemfira in 2008

The final concert promoting Thank You was held on 1 April 2008 at the Olimpiysky stadium in Moscow; some journalists considered it as the best performance in her career. Later in June Zemfira was awarded an independent Steppenwolf prize established by a musical critic Artemy Troitsky. She won in two categories: The Best Performance (for the Olimpiysky show) and The Best Album (Thank You). The movie-concert Green Theatre in Zemfira by Litvinova was named the best musical movie of the year.

On 21 March 2009, an album of b-sides Z-Sides leaked into the net.

In June 2010, Zemfira wrote on her official website: "vacation is over" and announced a mini-tour to promote a deluxe-edition of her first three albums (Zemfira, PMML and 14 Weeks of Silence). On 1 August she performed a set of 4 songs on the closing concert of a pop-music contest New Wave. It was her first performance since January 2009. The arrangements of this set were used in the mini-tour in September that included 5 cities: Saint-Petersburg, Yekaterinburg, Minsk, Kyiv and Moscow. Critics admitted that her old songs became more rhythmic and resembled demo-versions due to the new minimalistic style of arrangements. In October, Zemfira took part in two tribute concerts "20 Years without KINO" in Moscow and Saint-Petersburg that were dedicated to the memory of Viktor Tsoi. Her gig of four covers on Tsoi's songs was seen by some journalists as the most noticeable performance in the program.

On New Year's Eve 2011, the video version of two Moscow concerts staged in Crocus City Hall and Strelka Institute in September 2010 was broadcast on TV Rain channel. The video was directed by Renata Litvinova. Then the singer informed her fans that the release of her sixth album had moved to Fall 2011. The first single No Chance (Bez shansov) was presented on Nashe Radio on 15 April. During the next three months she gave three performances: on 28 May Zemfira took part in the international rock festival Maxidrom along with The Prodigy, Adam Lambert, Korn, Brainstorm and other artists; then she became a Russian headliner of a Muz-TV Awards ceremony show at Olimpiysky stadium on 3 June; on 23 July Zemfira performed at the Afisha Picnic outdoor festival in Moscow as the Russian headliner of the main stage. During that gig she presented a new song called "Money". At her April 2013 concert in Kyiv, she was joined by several leading figures of Ukrainian showbusiness on stage, including Svyatoslav Vakarchuk. She offended some audience members by comparing Kyiv to Moscow, in that she had to work hard, rather than Odesa and St Petersburg where the crowd do the work.

In July 2015, Zemfira unfurled Ukraine's national flag at a concert in the Georgian capital of Tbilisi, drawing criticism from Russian media, while several promoters in Russia abandoned their plans to include her in their programs. However, in 2016, in a concert in Lithuania, Zemfira demanded the audience to remove a huge Ukrainian flag that was unfolded by fans. She said, "I'm Russian, we're in Lithuania. I'm asking you, get rid of that flag. Whilst you love your country, I love mine."

In February 2016, during her "Little Man" (Маленький человек) tour Zemfira announced that she would stop touring, which was misrepresented in the media as her abandoning musical performance altogether. Musical critic Troitsky commented that while he does not doubt that the announcement was made in earnest, he believed that since Zemfira is an emotional person, she may change her decision later. As of November 2016, the "Little Man" tour continues in North America.

=== 2020−present ===
In April 2020, Zemfira released the single "Crimea", and on September 6, she performed as the headliner at the Stereoleto festival in St. Petersburg. On February 26, 2021, the singer released her seventh studio album, Borderline, her first in eight years. The album consists of 12 songs. The album cover features the title written in white letters on a black background, crossed out several times. In July 2021, she released a four-song mini-album titled Ah.

In 2021, Zemfira's music video остин (Austin), directed by Alexey Krupnik, was the overall winner of the Berlin Music Video Awards, while it also won the award for the Best Concept category.

During the 2022 Russian invasion of Ukraine, officially forbidden to be called a war in Russia, her website featured only the statement "нет войне" ("no to war"). Though she performed a concert in Moscow on the day the invasion began, she was reported to have left the country. On 21 March, she released an anti-war music video to her 2017 song "Don't Shoot", while also removing all of her other songs from her YouTube channel. The video contained footage of Russia’s military assault on Ukraine and of anti-war protests in Moscow. In March of 2022, Russian media circulated information about Zemfira's emigration to France, the singer herself did not comment on this. On May 19, 2022, Zemfira released the anti-war song "Meat". The music video consisted of drawings created by Renata Litvinova, who also directed and edited it. On May 25, 2022, "Meat" was posted on major music streaming services. In the summer of 2022, the media published a list of musical performers whose performances in Russia were allegedly deemed undesirable, including Zemfira.

In February 2023, the Russian government placed Zemfira in its list of "foreign agents". On March 10, 2023, Zemfira released the anti-war single "Rodina" (lit. 'Motherland', stylized as "PODNHA"). On May 10, 2023, through her representative, Zemfira sent a lawsuit to the Ministry of Justice, demanding that the foreign agent status be declared illegal, which was later rejected. At the same time, the singer opened a recording and music publishing company in Moscow called Rodina. In late May, the media reported that Zemfira had obtained French citizenship, but the singer soon denied it.

== Lyrics ==
Zemfira's lyrics are known for their originality and unique style. The singer herself does not like to discuss lyrics in interviews and does not consider herself a poet. Nevertheless, her lyrics are often published in rock poetry collections. In an interview with Toppop.ru, Zemfira said that she could not describe lyrics: "It's hard for me to talk about lyrics. I can still think about music — there's blues, there's electronica — but with lyrics, it's more difficult. What you want to say, you say". Nevertheless, many journalists have made them the subject of their research. During the program School of Scandal, Avdotya Smirnova and Tatyana Tolstaya called Zemfira a distinctive poet in interviews with her. Some researchers find parallels between Zemfira's early lyrics and the poetry of Yanka Dyagileva. It has been noted that Zemfira's world is seen through the eyes of a young person discovering life for the first time. In her songs, love is paired with death. The song Synoptik states that "the highest result in the will to life is achieved through death". The semantic invariant of the first album was the song AIDS, which contains the idea that: "You love — you die". Some songs feature the phenomenon of "teenage language", using phrases in English like "comebacks" and "our birthday with you". Sabrina Yassi has noted that Zemfira's lyrics are deeply entwined with taboo yet pervasive societal themes, such as alienation, depression, sexuality, and AIDS.

In 2000, the magazine Znamya published an article devoted to the artist's early lyrics. A researcher of Zemfira's work wrote that her poetry refers to the "symbolic 69th" year and the era of rock musicians. The researcher also mentioned the themes of Fragmentarity, Love and Fear, A Look at the Place of Habitat (City), Youth, and Death as a Synthesis of the Previous. These themes are deeply and personally experienced by the author. By the third album, music journalists had begun to emphasize the singer's unique language. Olga Gaidukova of Sounds.ru wrote that the album contains "the same uneven versification — touching poetic revelations are combined with 'passable' lines, the salt of which is probably obvious only to Zemfira herself." Gaidukova noted that lines such as "paranoia-long dream" and "on the lips let's be friends" will definitely be quoted. She also noted the textual continuity to the singer's earlier compositions in many songs. Tikhon Romanov wrote that Zemfira is "a master of composing scathing phrases that need no interpretation". In the album Fourteen Weeks of Silence, such phrases are found in almost every song: "Time kills me, I kill time" (Song), "I will be forever near, your deadly poison, your last look" (R), "I hear: I fly higher than everyone; the fall is more painful, but the sensations are better" (Feeling).

The song Webgirl touched on themes of internet communication. Zemfira said the song was based on her personal experiences. She added that she has had online romances herself: "I've had a few online romances. Hasn't anyone else had one? But these romances are all short-term. Two months at a time. They develop at first, and then it all goes away. It's a gamble. The main thing is to not know who it is or see the photo because then the whole point is lost".

The fourth album, Vendetta, has been described as thematically very personal, intimate, and candid. According to Michael Baev of Fuzz magazine, Zemfira reached "the limits of self-depth" on Vendetta. Alexei Vishnya felt that Vendetta revealed the singer's gift for speaking to a generation in their own language. "Sex, drugs, and death; separation drowned in blue — great sources of inspiration. The whole album is saturated with hatred; a nervous caprice hangs in the air with an axe", — he noted. Social themes appeared on the album for the first time. Nebomoreoblaka (Skyseaclouds) is the only song from the album with social overtones. Dmitry Yakushev of Left.ru wrote that the song was clearly directed "against the orders and results of show business". The mention of singer Valeria in the song sparked much discussion in the press. After the album's release, Zemfira linked its theme to the record Vendetta. According to the artist, "If Vendetta was restless and I was searching, then here I found it". The relationship between these albums is similar to the relationship between Queen's A Day at the Races and A Night at the Opera. "A period of misunderstanding is a period of understanding". In terms of poetry, the album featured the waltz Boy and the song Gentlemen. Mikhail Margolis wrote that in the waltz, "the address to the boy and the decadent presentation of the song immediately resurrect Gumilev's 'My dear boy, you are so cheerful...'" Vyacheslav Ogryzko drew parallels between Shevchuk's "Blind Boy," Auktsyon's "Boy," and Kira Muratova's work, noting the adolescent maximalism in the phrase "Zero money. Zero sex. Music is dead".

Yuri Loza emphasized that, in her work, Zemfira reflects the views and sympathies of a woman who is "lost in this world and dangles between the values accepted in any society and a certain elite loneliness". The partner present in Zemfira's songs is not a husband. Rather, it is an abstract "you" with whom she has a strange relationship; there is nothing about family or raising children. There is "kill the neighbors", but such a text does not quite fit into the worldview of an ordinary person. According to Loza, such turns are inadmissible according to the canons of creating a professional pop text.

== Musical style ==
Zemfira's musical style is classified within the genres of rock and pop-rock. Her music reflects influences from guitar pop as well as harmonies of jazz and bossa nova. Michael Zilberman noted that influences on the singer’s music can be traced to non-Russian artists. In her lighter works, traces of Suzanne Vega and Portishead can be heard, while in her heavier compositions, elements of Alanis Morissette and Ani DiFranco are evident. Sabrina Jaszi, writing for Allmusic, stated that musically, Zemfira is closer to Kate Bush and Björk, with her "complex, obsessive aesthetic of stadium rock filled with lo-fi guitar melodies and screaming vocals". Vladimir Polupanov observed in her early songs "major guitar pop of the ‘90s, diluted with naive ‘70s keyboards", and in her singing, "timbral similarities with Aguzarova’s vocals". The second album expands the genre diversity of the band’s music. Tender ballads (Do You Want?, Cigarettes) and grunge (the chorus of I Was Searching) appear. Zemfira steps beyond the sound of her band, incorporating slide guitars, piano, strings, brass, saxophone, and electronic elements. Some songs give the impression of being recorded in the mid-1980s (Ripened and City).

Later, Zemfira embarked on a long period of experimentation with sound. On her third album, Fourteen Weeks of Silence, the focus was placed on the quality of the sound. Alexey Krizhevsky from the online newspaper VestiRu noted: "The professionalism of the sound on the album is brought to a filigree, meticulously polished, and orchestrated precision of every sound, combined with restrained (or deliberately subdued) energy. Yes, Zemfira still swings distinctively where there’s a steady rhythm and can allow herself to be playful in the spirit of her first album on the track Sage, but her hands no longer reach to tear her shirt—they hold an expensive microphone". Overall, the album is performed in the rock music genre with a predominance of guitar sound. A different assessment was given by Alexander Neverov from Itogi magazine. In his opinion, the album features the then-popular trip-hop, as well as jazz and blues, though "rather conditional".

Tikhon Romanov in Weekly Journal wrote that the album turned out calm and balanced musically. "If two years ago Zemfira’s intensity was reminiscent of alternative rock artist PJ Harvey, in the current melancholic intonation, one can hear something of the tender lyricism of Suzanne Vega. Moreover, there are similar arrangements in places… And there’s not only quiet sadness but also depressive grunge in the style of Nirvana, passages reminiscent of Deep Purple, and references to Rolling Stones and Depeche Mode", the journalist noted. In Komsomolskaya Pravda, it was written that her song Sentiments composition is unusual for the singer, and Zemfira appears in it as a "Russian Sade", with "a melodic, jazzy introduction that immediately transports you to a cozy bar with dim lighting and barely audible music".

Vendetta became an even more experimental record, with one part consisting of electronic compositions and the other of rock songs. In terms of genre, the album includes hard rock, trip-hop, Britpop, disco, and synth-pop. In an interview with Russian Newsweek, the artist elaborated on the album’s musical diversity: "A colorful album. Many styles—purists of genre purity will criticize. Archaic rock, even blues, and electronic arrangements. I’m a person with broad views—that’s how I wanted it". Boris Barabanov wrote that the simplest way to describe the album is as rock, as "the guitar sound has never been so heavy and grandiose on her records before". However, after listening, the critic noted that only four songs (Skyseaclouds, Give Me Your Hand, Baby, and Hang Yourself) are performed in a rock vein. On the other hand, he considered that "the album could just as well be described as a collection of ‘sad lyrical pieces,’ occasionally interrupted by rock-and-rolls". Alexey Mazhaev, in Musical Truth, wrote that Vendetta is a kind of puzzle that "everyone can assemble for themselves from beautiful motifs, heartfelt lyrics, electronic sounds, alternating with heavy rock". Sergey Stepanov from Rol.ru stated that "Zemfira more readily than usual scatters allusions and hyperlinks, to the point of absurdity: the album features, in turn, a melody from The Police, a drum loop from Radiohead, and a guitar riff in the style of Foo Fighters.

In the course of working on the album, Zemfira created her first blues—the eponymous track. In an interview with Guru Ken, Zemfira mentioned that the song is her first blues, made according to all the genre’s canons:

Actually, I've never liked blues songs. Even in music school, we were all forced to listen to them, play them. There are some traditional blues forms, twelve-bar, minor, major… It was precisely for their traditionalism that I didn’t like them. But, apparently, something accumulated in me—and I got my first blues in my life. I wanted to make it as archaic as possible, with an old drum sound…

Alexey Mazhaev considered that in terms of arrangement, the song is almost blues, but melodically it resembles the track Infinity from the album Fourteen Weeks of Silence. Kapitolina Delovaya noted that the song is still an atypical blues. She pointed out the connection of Blues with Zemfira’s song London Sky and highlighted that the composition showcases the wide range of the singer’s voice.

On the album Thank You, the artist moved toward more "complex music". Boris Barabanov wrote that Zemfira had long abandoned creating music according to the rules of "formatted" Russian rock. "Her album Thank You (2007) marked a shift to ‘complex’ music, which was duly appreciated by, for example, people like the neo-academic composer Vladimir Martynov". The reviewer noted that the album Z-Sides presented completely different material, referencing "carefree pop".

== Discography ==
=== Studio albums ===
- 1999 ― Zemfira (Земфира)
- 2000 ― Forgive Me My Love (Прости меня моя любовь, Prosti menya moya lyubov)
- 2002 ― 14 Weeks of Silence (Четырнадцать недель тишины, Chetyrnadtsat nedel tishiny)
- 2005 ― Vendetta (Вендетта)
- 2007 ― Thank You (Спасибо, Spasibo)
- 2013 ― Live in Your Head (Жить в твоей голове, Zhit v tvoey golove)
- 2021 ― Borderline (Бордерлайн, Borderlayn)

=== Live albums ===
- 2006 ― Zemfira.Live (Земфира.Live)
- 2010 ― Zemfira.Live2 (Земфира.Live2)
- 2016 — Little Man. Live (Маленький человек.Live, Malenkii chelovek.Live)

=== Compilation albums ===
- 2007 — Thank You, Vendetta (Спасибо, Вендетта, Spasibo, Vendetta)
- 2010 — Z-Sides

=== Box sets ===
- 2010 — Zemfira. Gift Edition (Земфира. Подарочное издание, Zemfira. Podarochnoe izdanie)

=== Soundtracks ===
- 2012 — Rita's Last Fairy Tale (Последняя сказка Риты, Poslednyaya skazka Rity)
- 2021 — North wind (Северный ветер, Severnyy veter)

=== EPs ===
- 2021 ― Oh (Ах, Akh)

=== Singles ===
- 1999 — "Snow" (Снег, Sneg)
- 2000 — "Goodbye..." (До свидания..., Do svidaniya)
- 2000 — "To Wait (Hali-gali)" (Ждать (Хали-гали), Zdat (Khali-gali))
- 2001 — "Traffic" (Трафик, Trafik)
- 2004 — "Skyseaclouds" (Небомореоблака, Nebomoreoblaka)
- 2007 — "Boy" (Мальчик, Malchik)
- 2008 — "10 Boys" (10 мальчиков, 10 malchikov)
- 2011 — "No Chance" (Без шансов, Bez shansov)
- 2012 — "Money" (Деньги, Dengi)
- 2018 — "Joseph" (with Mujuice) (Джозеф, Dzhozef)
- 2020 — "Crimea" (Крым, Krym)
- 2021 ― "Austin" (Остин, Ostin)
- 2022 — "Meat" (Мясо, Myaso)
- 2023 — "Homeland" (Родина, Rodina; stylized as PODNHA)
- 2024 — "Colette"
- 2025 — "Jim Beam"

=== Side project releases ===
- 2013 — First & Last (EP; the release of the side project The Uchpochmack)
- 2022 — Zemfira from Luke (EP; Земфира от Луки, Zemfira ot Luki; the release of the side project Zemfira from Luke)
- 2024 — "Dramatique" (single; the release of the side project Zemfira from Luke)

=== Joint releases ===
- 2004 — Goddess: How I fell in Love (with Igor Vdovin) (Богиня: как я полюбила, Boginya: kak ya polyubila; soundtrack to Renata Litvinova's film)
- 2023 — Cactus (with Dmitry Emelyanov) (soundtrack to Renata Litvinova's play)

== Filmography ==
- Goddess: How I Fell In Love (Богиня: Как я полюбила) (2004)
- Green Theater in Zemfira (Зелёный театр в Земфире) (2008)
- Moscow. Crocus/Strelka (Москва.Крокус/Стрелка) (2010)
- New York, The Theater at MSG April 12th, 2024
- Miami, Jackie Gleason Theatre, April 17th, 2024

== Awards and nominations ==
MTV Europe Music Awards

Year	Nominee / work	Award	Result
2001	Herself	Best Russian Act	Nominated
2005	Herself	Best Russian Act	Nominated
2013	Herself	Best Russian Act	Won
2013	Herself	Best Eastern European Act	Nominated

Russian National Music Awards

Year	Nominee / work	Award	Result
2015	Herself	Best Rock Artist	Nominated

Muz-TV Awards

Year	Nominee / work	Award	Result	Ref.
2003	14 Недель Тишины	Best Album	Nominated	
2003	"Бесконечность"	Best Song	Nominated	
2005	Herself	Best Female Act	Nominated	
2006	Herself	Best Female Act	Nominated	
2006	Вендетта	Best Album	Nominated	
2008	Herself	Best Female Act	Nominated	
2008	Tour	Best Show	Nominated	
2008	Спасибо	Best Album	Nominated	
2008	"Мы разбиваемся"	Best Song	Nominated	
2008	"Мы разбиваемся"	Best Video	Nominated	
2012	Herself	Best Female Act of Decade	Won	
2014	Herself	Best Female Act	Nominated	
2016	Herself	Best Female Act	Nominated	
2016	Herself	Best Rock Act	Nominated	
2017	"Жить в твоей голове"	Best Song of 15 Years	Nominated	

ZD Awards

Year	Nominee / work	Award	Result	Ref.
1999	Herself	Best Female	Won	

Zolotaya Pchela

Year	Nominee / work	Award	Result	Ref.
2005	Herself	Artist of the Year	Nominated	

Berlin Music Video Awards

Year	Nominee / Work	Award	Result
2021	"остин (Austin)"	Best Music Video	Won
2021	"остин (Austin)"	Best Concept	Won

== Bibliography ==
- Alekseev, A. S. (2009). Кто есть кто в российской рок-музыке [Who's who in Russian rock music] (in Russian). М.: АСТ. pp. 183–186. ISBN 978-5-17-048654-0.
