= Yours, Svoy: The Best of 2005–2012 =

Compilation album by Svoy
- Released: December 12, 2012
- Genre: Electronica, Pop, alternative
- Length: 45:13
- Label: Svoy
- Producer: Svoy

Svoy chronology
Solved EP (2012)	Yours, Svoy: The Best of 2005–2012 (2012)	Lovedso EP (2014)

Professional ratings
Review scores
Source	Rating
OKMusic.jp	3/5 stars

Yours, Svoy: The Best of 2005–2012 is the first compilation solo album by Svoy. It was released internationally on December 12, 2012. The album marked 7 years from the original release of Svoy's debut album Eclectric (Rendezvous Entertainment/Universal Music Group) on December 13, 2005. During that time, Svoy's music received international critical acclaim, earned Billboard chart positions, MTV spotlight, heavy radio rotation, won prestigious awards and nominations, got the attention and praise of renowned artists and music professionals, landed major publishing, record and endorsement deals for the artist. Svoy has been described as a musician who is "...Not afraid to explore" by TheCelebrityCafe.com; "...Robot-driven repetitive-trance big-dance-rhythm cold synth-pop modern-chart soul futuristic electro-disco techno meister" by New York's Big Takeover Magazine; and "...A quintessentially modern songman" by Download.com, to name a few. The collection of songs showcases selections from the artist's extensive body of work between the years of 2005 and 2012.

== Track listing ==
No.	Title	Writer(s)	Length
1.	"Automatons"	Svoy	2:59
2.	"Tonight"	Svoy	3:59
3.	"Driving Away"	Svoy	3:32
4.	"Never Grow Up"	Svoy	3:37
5.	"Beautiful Thing"	Svoy	3:07
6.	"25 AM"	Svoy	5:35
7.	"Psychotherapist"	Svoy	3:49
8.	"Say Goodbye"	Svoy	4:31
9.	"Looking for You (Consequence EP 1.0 Version)"	Svoy	3:47
10.	"When I Think of You"	Svoy	4:03
11.	"Right Here, Right Now"	Svoy	3:09
12.	"I'm Yours"	Svoy	3:12

== Personnel ==
- Svoy – keyboards, vocals, producer, programming, arrangement, sound engineering, mixing, mastering, art direction, design
- Fernanda Faya – photography
