= Ilya Lagutenko =

Russian opera singer (born 1968)

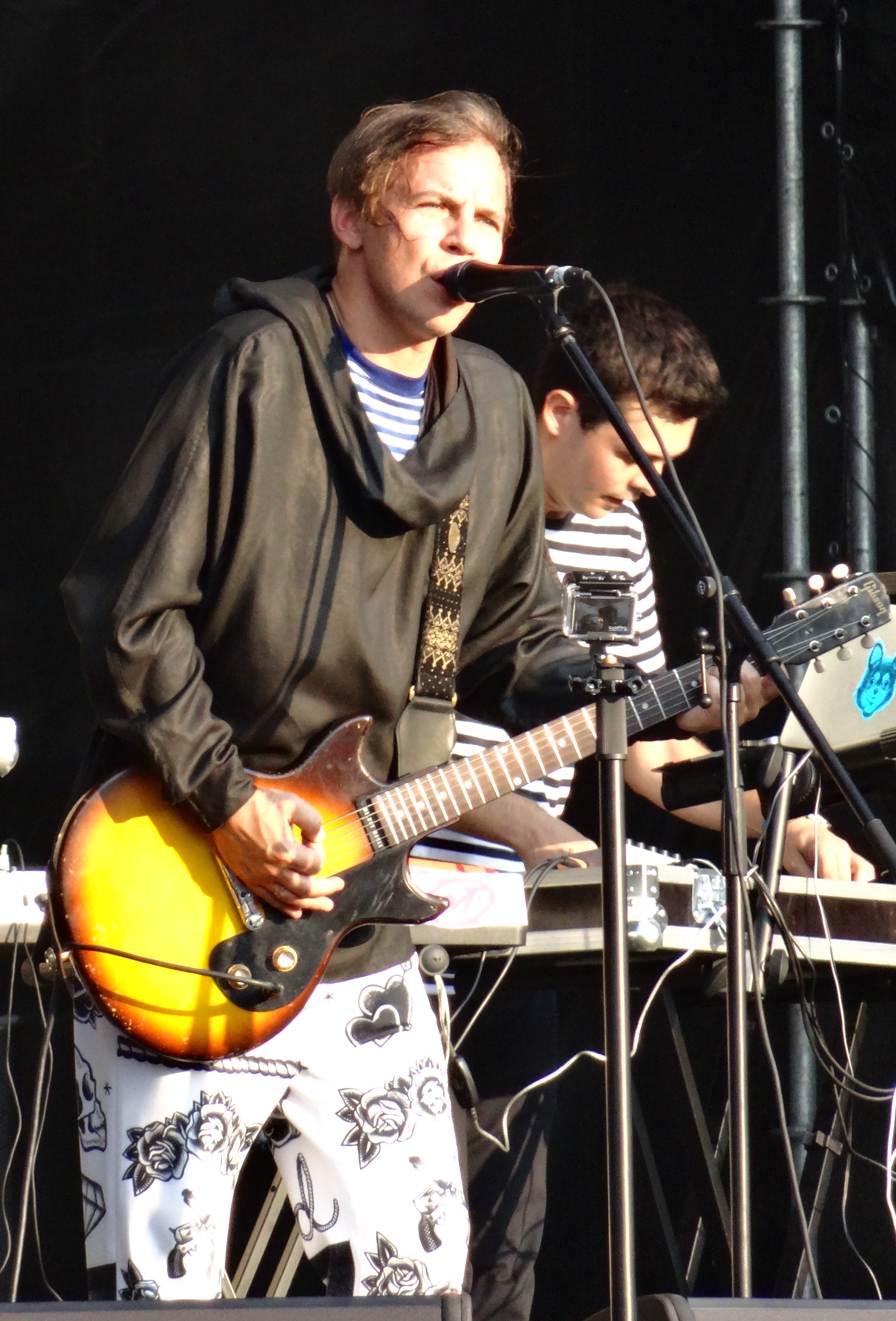
- Lagutenko performing in 2013

Background information
- Born: 16 October 1968 (age 57); Moscow, Russian SFSR, Soviet Union
- Origin: Vladivostok, Russian SFSR, Soviet Union
- Genres: Alternative rock; Pop rock; Britpop; Rock and roll; pop; Indie rock; electronic; experimental
- Occupations: Singer; musician; guitarist; composer; actor; translator; poet; painter; writer
- Years active: 1983–present

Ilya Igorevich Lagutenko (Russian: Илья Игоревич Лагутенко; born 16 October 1968) is the founder and lead singer of the rock band Mumiy Troll.

== Career ==
He was born in Moscow, Soviet Union. Soon after his birth his father died, and the family moved to Vladivostok. In school he became engrossed in studying Chinese. He sang with a children's choir that took him to many Russian cities as they traveled through half of the country. Ilya formed his first psychedelic punk band named "Boney P" (ostensibly drawing on the name of the band Boney M, which was quite popular in the Soviet Union around that time) at the age of 11. In 1992, he graduated from the Far Eastern State University as a specialist in the Mandarin and Chinese Economy. He served in the Russian Air Navy. Ilya worked in China and the United Kingdom with a commercial consulting firm. In 1983, he founded the rock group Mumiy Troll.

He was chosen a "Man of the Year 2005" for November by Glamour magazine and "Musician of the Year" by GQ many times. Ilya Lagutenko has changed not only the music but also the clothes, hairstyles and behaviour of Russian young people.

Lagutenko starred as a vampire in the Russian blockbuster The Night Watch (Ночной Дозор). His face is on the cover of the American release.

In 2009, Lagutenko co-wrote the music on track "Intentions" and guested as a vocalist on Svoy's second album, Automatons, which was released in the U.S. and Japan, where it charted #100 in Billboard's Top Independent Albums. The album later won in several categories at the 10th Independent Music Awards in the United States.

Lagutenko is a well-known supporter of Siberian tiger conservation. He is a patron of Amur, a British-Russian partnership to protect tigers and their habitat, and named a Mumiy Troll album Amba, after an indigenous word for tigers in the Russian Far East. Mumiy Troll was the first to support the activities of PSI organization fighting AIDS in Russia.

== Personal life ==
In 2003, Ilya Lagutenko divorced Elena Troinovskaya. Their son Igor was born.

In 2007, Ilya married his second wife Anna Zhukova (model). In October 2008, their daughter Valentina-Veronica was born. In April 2010, Anna gave birth to second daughter, Letizia.
