= Automatons (album) =

Studio album by Svoy
- Released: August 19, 2009
- Genres: Electronica, pop, alternative
- Length: 50:07 (U.S.); 46:20 (Japan)
- Labels: Sixteenth Republic Records (U.S.); P-Vine Records/Blues Interactions (Japan)
- Producer: Svoy

Svoy chronology
Eclectric (2007)	Automatons (2009)	Grow Up (2011)

Alternative Cover
- Japan Edition Cover

Professional ratings
Review scores
Source	Rating
The Celebrity Cafe	3/5 stars
iLOUD.jp	7/10 stars
Bounce Magazine	favorable
Lounge-Music.jp	favorable
CDJournal Magazine	favorable
Billboard Japan	favorable

Automatons is the second solo album by Svoy. It was originally released in Japan August 19, 2009, on historic P-Vine Records/Blues Interactions. U.S./International release followed on November 2, 2010, on Sixteenth Republic Records.

== Background ==
Automatons expands upon artist's signature diverse sound by simultaneously paying tribute to his broad scope of musical influences and the sonic language of so-called "processed humanity". Svoy created 15 new selections of music and lyrics (including original cover of the Bee Gees' classic "Lonely Days" and an excerpt from "Silentium!", a poem by Fyodor Tyutchev). Two songs on Automatons were written and performed in collaboration with Adam Levy (multi platinum-selling songwriter/singer/guitarist for Tracy Chapman, Amos Lee and Norah Jones' Handsome Band, grandson of George Wyle, author of Christmas song "It’s the Most Wonderful Time of the Year"); as well as Ilya Lagutenko (frontman/leader of Russia's superstar rock band Mumiy Troll, MTV Award winner, legendary multi-hit songwriter/singer/actor, whose acting credits include "Night Watch" (2005), international blockbuster by director Timur Bekmambetov ("Wanted", 2008)).

Album's lead single "Beautiful Thing" reached No. 69 on the Billboard Japan Hot TOP 100 Airplay and No. 82 on Billboard Japan Hot 100 Singles chart. Besides remaining in top 40 and 100 airplay charts of numerous major Japanese radio networks for over 8 weeks, the song peaked at No. 3 on Alpha Station FM Kyoto 89.4's TOP 40 Overseas Chart. Also in 2009, Automatons reached No. 100 on the Billboard Japan Top Independent Albums and Singles chart.

In February, 2011, the album and its title track received two nominations at The 10th Independent Music Awards in Best Dance/Electronica Album and Best Dance/Electronica Song categories, winning in the latter category in March, 2011. 10th Independent Music Awards judging panel included Seal, Fall Out Boy, Portishead, McCoy Tyner, Counting Crows, Aerosmith, Ozzy Osbourne, Suzanne Vega, Jesse Harris, Tom Waits, Aimee Mann, Jonatha Brooke among other notable artists and music industry professionals.

In July 2011, it was announced that Automatons also won The 10th Independent Music Awards' Vox Populi (fan-based portion of the annual awards) in both Best Dance/Electronica Song and Best Dance/Electronica Album categories.

== Track listing ==
No.	Title	Writer(s)	Length
1.	"Over Me"	Svoy	3:21
2.	"Automatons"	Svoy	3:00
3.	"Beautiful Thing"	Svoy	3:07
4.	"I'm Yours (You're Mine)"	Svoy	3:08
5.	"Automatons Interlude"	Svoy	0:18
6.	"25 AM"	Svoy	5:34
7.	"Intentions" (with Ilya Lagutenko)	Svoy, Ilya Lagutenko	3:47
8.	"Words"	Fyodor Tyutchev	0:18
9.	"Words in Vain" (with Adam Levy)	Svoy, Adam Levy	4:57
10.	"Psychotherapist"	Svoy	3:49
11.	"Adore"	Svoy	1:39
12.	"Science (In/Out)"	Svoy	4:26
13.	"Lonely Days"	Barry Gibb, Robin Gibb, Maurice Gibb	4:11
14.	"One For the Road" ("Tyburn Tree (One for the Road)" on Japan edition)	Svoy	4:47

U.S. Bonus Track
No.	Title	Writer(s)	Length
15.	"Driving Away 3010"	Svoy	3:47

== Personnel ==
- Svoy – keyboards, vocals, spoken word, producer, programming, vocal arrangement, sound engineering, mixing, mastering, art direction, design
- Adam Levy – guest artist, lead vocals, guitar (track 9)
- Ilya Lagutenko – guest artist, lead vocals (track 7)
- Kevin Reagan – Svoy logo design
- Fernanda Faya – photography

== Charts ==
Single	Peak chart positions	
Single	Japan Hot 100 Airplay	Japan Hot 100 Singles
"Beautiful Thing"	69	82

Album	Peak chart positions
Album	Japan Top Independent Albums and Singles
Automatons	100

== Release history ==
Region	Date	Label
Japan	August 19, 2009	P-Vine Records/Blues Interactions
United States	November 2, 2010	Sixteenth Republic Records
