= Symphony No.1: What Happened When I Was Asleep =

Studio album by Svoy
- Released: June 23, 2015
- Genre: Electronica, EDM, pop, alternative
- Length: 37:38
- Label: Songs of Universal/Universal Music Group, Inc.
- Producer: Svoy

Svoy chronology
Lovedsolved (2014)	Symphony No.1: What Happened When I Was Asleep (2015)

Professional ratings
Review scores
Source	Rating
PopMatters	favorable
YourEDM	favorable
EDM Assassin	favorable
With Guitars	favorable
Planet of Sound	favorable

Symphony No.1: What Happened When I Was Asleep is the fifth solo album by Svoy. It was released on June 23, 2015, on Songs of Universal/Universal Music Group, Inc. The album was in production for over 5 years during which Svoy created 10 new selections, including original cover of The Beatles' classic "The Long and Winding Road" and Adam Levy's "I Shot Her Down". PopMatters' Brice Ezell described it as "...A brooding and knotty piece of music, one whose serpentine flow evades easy comprehension", EDM Assassin's Nick Pesavento suggested "...You will not be able to pull your headphones out" and YourEDM's Timmy Kusnierek wrote "...It's a beautifully avant-garde collection that incorporates the gamut of genres, including breakbeat, dub, neoclassical, ambient, and more. The ten tracks of the album escalate in intensity, each more pensive and introspective than the last".

== Track listing ==
No.	Title	Writer(s)	Length
1.	"Symphony No.1: I. Now"	Svoy	4:50
2.	"Symphony No.1: II. Ammunition"	Svoy	2:58
3.	"Symphony No.1: III. Burning Train"	Svoy	1:54
4.	"Symphony No.1: IV. The Long and Winding Road"	John Lennon, Paul McCartney	6:02
5.	"Symphony No.1: V. What it Feels Like"	Svoy	4:04
6.	"Symphony No.1: VI. Waiting for You"	Svoy	3:29
7.	"Symphony No.1: VII. I Shot Her Down"	Adam Levy, Damien Bracken, Gargaro Areste	1:22
8.	"Symphony No.1: VIII. Forgive"	Svoy	3:41
9.	"Symphony No.1: IX. Sleeping Beauty"	Svoy	5:53
10.	"Symphony No.1: X. Love"	Svoy	3:25

== Personnel ==
- Svoy – keyboards, vocals, spoken word, producer, programming, vocal arrangement, sound engineering, mixing, mastering, art direction, design

== Release history ==
Region	Date	Label
United States	June 23, 2015	Songs of Universal/Universal Music Group, Inc.
