= Grow Up (Svoy album) =

Studio album by Svoy
- Released: June 22, 2011
- Genre: Electronica, pop, alternative rock
- Length: 33:30 (U.S.); 37:38 (Japan)
- Label: Sixteenth Republic Records (U.S.); Thistime Records (Japan)
- Producer: Svoy

Svoy chronology
Automatons (2009)	Grow Up (2011)	Solved EP (2012)

Alternative Cover

Professional ratings
Review scores
Source	Rating
TheCelebrityCafe.com	(favorable)
Skream! Magazine	(favorable)
FlakeRecords Magazine	(favorable)
FM Kento	(favorable)
Bounce Magazine	(favorable)

Grow Up is the third self-produced solo album by Svoy. It was released in Japan on June 22, 2011, on Thistime Records. U.S./International release followed on June 28, 2011, on Sixteenth Republic Records. In July 2011, it was announced that the album's opening track "Never Grow Up" was picked up for power rotation by Japan's FM Ishikawa 80.5 MHz with the song debuting at No. 95 on the station's HOT 100 Chart and subsequently peaking at No. 63. In the same month, it was announced that another track from the album, "Right Here, Right Now", was picked up for Hyper Power Play by Japan's FM Kento 76.5 MHz, with an exclusive feature of "Grow Up" album cover artwork on FM Kento's internet home page. In November, 2011, Russian version of "Never Grow Up" entitled "Navsegda" was added by Moscow's major radio network 94.8 MHz RU.FM and remained in steady rotation until July 2013. Following its release, the album received international critical acclaim: New York City's TheCelebrityCafe.com described the album as "...A sonic adventure. Swooning. Emotive."; Tokyo's Skream! Magazine called it "...Superb. Sophisticated. Beautiful."; Tokyo's Bounce Magazine described it as "...Wispy. Poetic."; Osaka's Flake Records Magazine noted that the album is "...Beautiful. Exhilarating." and Niigata's 76.5 FM Kento gave the album "...High praise.".

== Track listing ==
No.	Title	Writer(s)	Length
1.	"Never Grow Up"	Svoy	3:37
2.	"Right Here, Right Now"	Svoy	3:08
3.	"Help Me Remember"	Svoy	3:17
4.	"Everything You Want"	Svoy	3:52
5.	"Unpopular"	Svoy	2:47
6.	"Front Line (Telling You)"	Svoy	3:21
7.	"Something That's Not Yours"	Svoy	3:09
8.	"Appreciate"	Svoy	1:45
9.	"Crocodile Tears (Say Goodbye)"	Svoy	4:28
10.	"When I Think of You"	Svoy	4:03

Japan Bonus Track
No.	Title	Writer(s)	Length
11.	"Exit Through You"	Peter Gabriel, Joseph Arthur	3:50

== Personnel ==
- Svoy – keyboards, keytar, vocals, spoken word, producer, programming, arrangement, sound engineering, mixing, mastering, photography, art direction, design
- Kevin Reagan – Svoy logo design

== Release history ==
Region	Date	Label
Japan	June 22, 2011	Thistime Records
United States	June 28, 2011	Sixteenth Republic Records
