= Lovedso EP =

EP by Svoy
- Released: March 18, 2014
- Genre: Electronica; pop; alternative
- Length: 25:22
- Label: Svoy under license to Songs of Universal, a division of Universal Music Group, Inc.
- Producer: Svoy

Svoy chronology
Yours, Svoy: The Best of 2005-2012 (2012)	Lovedso EP (2014)	Lovedsolved (2014)

Professional ratings
Review scores
Source	Rating
OKMusic.jp	3/5 stars
TheCelebrityCafe.com	3/5 stars

Lovedso is the third self-produced solo EP by Svoy. It was released internationally on March 18, 2014. The album is the first collection of entirely new material by the artist in two years and is a follow-up to Solved EP (2012). "I am beyond thrilled to share the new music with my fans. Making this EP was incredibly satisfying on multiple levels" said Svoy in a press statement. Music critic Chelsea Lewis of TheCelebrityCafe.com gave the album three stars out of five and described it as a "...Multi-level complex musical vibe". One of the songs on the album was written in collaboration with Grammy-nominated Universal Music Group writer/Platinum producer, Ced Solo.

== Track listing ==
No.	Title	Writer(s)	Length
1.	"Flee"	Svoy	3:03
2.	"Become"	Svoy	6:11
3.	"Weary"	Svoy	5:55
4.	"Loved So"	Svoy	5:41
5.	"Better Than Ever Before"	Svoy, Ced Solo	4:32

== Personnel ==
- Svoy – keyboards, keytar solo, vocals, producer, programming, arrangement, sound engineering, mixing, mastering, art direction, design
