= Spasibo =

2007 Zemfira album

Spasibo (Thank You)

Studio album by Zemfira
- Released: October 3, 2007
- Recorded: 2007
- Studio: London
- Genre: Indie rock, alternative rock, post-rock, jazz, art rock
- Length: 42:59
- Label: Kommersant Publishing House
- Producer: Zemfira Ramazanova, Boris Barabanov

Zemfira chronology
Zemfira. Live (2006)	Spasibo (Thank You) (2007)	Spasibo, Vendetta (Thank You, Vendetta) (2007)

Spasibo (Thank You; Russian: Спасибо) is the fifth studio album by Russian singer Zemfira. It was released on October 3, 2007. In Russia, more than 200,000 copies were sold, and approximately 50,000 copies were sold in the CIS.

The songs for the album were composed and recorded over the course of one year: from the fall of 2006 to the fall of 2007 (according to Zemfira herself, the first song was written on September 24, 2006). Recording took place in London, with mixing in Moscow at Mosfilm.

To support the album, Zemfira began a tour that began on October 21, 2007, in Vladivostok and concluded with a concert at the Olimpiysky Stadium in Moscow on April 1, 2008. During the tour, Zemfira held special autograph sessions in Euroset stores.

Overall, the album received mixed reviews from critics: some reviewers noted the innovative and experimental sound, while others pointed out "raw and rather weak" song lyrics.

== Release ==
As early as the summer of 2007, it became known that the singer was preparing a new album, and then Zemfira gave her only concert in Moscow (Green Theater of Gorky Park), appearing before the public.

The album release was preceded by the radio single Boy and the music video for We Are Crashing, directed by Renata Litvinova.

The album was released in collaboration with the Kommersant Publishing House and the Euroset company. From October 1, 2007, the album could be bought together with the first issue of the magazine "Citizen K" (a Kommersant Publishing House project), and from October 5 (in Moscow – from October 2) it was sold in Euroset mobile phone stores for 140 rubles. The disc was not sold in regular music stores. From early October, 30,000 copies of the album were sold together with the Citizen K magazine in Euroset stores and newsstands. By early December 2007, a total of 177,000 copies had been sold as part of the project.

In an interview with Echo of Moscow radio on September 24, 2007, Zemfira stated that regardless of the success of such an action, she did not plan to extend the contract for subsequent albums.

The presentation was held at the Vinzavod art center near Kursky railway station on September 27, and Zemfira made the concert entrance free. In a closed format, the singer performed five days later – at the presentation of the magazine Citizen K. On September 28, the album became available for download on the Internet. Regarding this, Zemfira stated:

Well, it's done. The album is online, ahead of schedule. It's pointless to shame anyone – thieves were, are, and will be. In contrast to those who create and give. Harmony, damn it.

On October 20 in Khabarovsk, Zemfira's tour in support of the new disc began, which ended with a concert at the Olimpiysky Sports Complex on April 1, 2008. During the tour, Zemfira held special autograph sessions in Euroset stores. At the concerts, a special maxi-single "10 Boys" was also sold, which includes 10 remakes of the song Boy sent to the singer during an Internet contest. Later, Zemfira commented on this method of album release:

The way everything was arranged with Thank You was a consequence of the difficult situation I found myself in – yes, of course, through my own fault. And the record company "helped". And I think I brilliantly got out of the situation, forgive my immodesty.

== Packaging and artwork ==
The album artwork was done by Alexander Lobanov, the cover photo was taken by Sergei Bermenev. The cover itself is white paper with a contour print of Zemfira's portrait, from whose hair feathers fly. A sticker with the inscription Thank You is attached over the image. Unlike the previous record, the cover of Thank You does not indicate Zemfira's name.

The album was distributed in three versions. A promo disc in a paper sleeve was distributed with the Citizen K magazine. The standard edition has a two-page booklet and a disc designed in the spirit of the sleeve. This version was distributed in Euroset mobile stores. The collector's edition is a digipak with Zemfira's autograph, a booklet containing song lyrics and two bonus video tracks (the clip We Are Crashing and footage from the studio during the recording of We Are Crashing).

== Critical reception ==
Professional ratings for Thank You
Review scores
Source	Rating
Rolling Stone Russia	3/5 stars
Vzgliad	8/10 stars

The album received mixed reviews, with the question of the song lyrics often raised. Thus, Andrei Bukharin from Rolling Stone noted that "finally Zemfira got out of the rut that had been dragging her since her stunning 1999 debut. Now we hear pure rock... and no electronics, fortunately – a complete analog feast with a sea of live instruments, from solo piano to orchestra. The album is not without flaws – it is heterogeneous, there are weak numbers (House) and taste lapses in the lyrics, – but the main thing is that Zemfira will not calm down in any way".

Yaroslav Zabaluev from the online publication Gazeta.ru gave a positive assessment of the work and wrote that "with the new album she finally proved her right to claim the status of the country's only independent singer".

A mixed assessment of the album was given by Mikhail Margolis, reviewer for the newspaper Izvestia, noting that "Thank You probably won't have an easy victory (compared to Zemfira's first records). But the disc will surely evoke the whole range of emotions, from delight to disappointment. Zemfira's "live" album, recorded with worthy musicians and focused on keys and trumpet, without any electronics admixture, is the most heterogeneous and aesthetic of her projects".

Guru Ken from the business newspaper Vzglyad noted that "Zemfira recorded such a conceptual album as she had never done before. With thought-out transitions between songs – sometimes butt-jointed, sometimes through selected atmospheric sounds. So why did it turn out so eclectic? It seems Zemfira was in a hurry to pour out everything she had. And the concept didn't hold. The songs crawl apart from hasty feverish statements, crawl apart like cockroaches, leaving spots of dried-up conceptualism behind".

Vladimir Polupanov from the portal TOPPOP.ru noted that Thank You is probably the singer's most intimate and chamber album, with a confessional tone and Tsvetaeva-like melancholy. It is no coincidence that the album includes a dedication to Marina Tsvetaeva – the song "I Fell in Love with You".

Margarita Tarantseva from the portal Pravaya.Ru also wrote that "if it weren't for a couple of ironic songs (Boy and I Fell in Love with You) and a timid attempt at topical satire (Gentlemen), the record could be unequivocally sent to the dump. Compared to the dark reflections and hypersexual optimism of the drunken punk girl in the previous album Vendetta, Zemfira is clearly drifting toward desperate self-destruction".

== Track listing ==
All tracks are written by Zemfira Ramazanova.

No.	Title	Length
1.	"In the Metro"	2:51
2.	"Sunday"	2:29
3.	"Home"	3:50
4.	"We Are Crashing"	3:22
5.	"Boy"	3:46
6.	"Gentlemen"	3:24
7.	"I Fell in Love with You"	2:45
8.	"Take Me"	4:26
9.	"Snow Will Start"	4:24
10.	"1000 Years"	4:10
11.	"In Me"	4:05
12.	"Thank You [rehearsal, November 2006]"	3:21
Total length:		42:59

== Personnel ==
- Zemfira Ramazanova – music, lyrics, vocals, acoustic guitar (2, 3), percussion, piano (12), synthesizer (11, 12), tubular bells (10), recording, mixing, production
- Dmitry Shurov – piano, organ, harpsichord, clavinet, Hammond, Rhodes, percussion, metallophone, accordion, celesta, string arrangements, recording, mixing, sound production
- Dan Marinkin – drums, percussion
- Nikolai Kozyrev – castanets, organ synthesizer (12), rainstick (9), recording, mixing, sound production
- Alexander Kondratyev – technical support
- Renata Litvinova – laughter, scream, karma
- Yuri Tsaler – guitar (except 9), acoustic guitar (1, 3)
- Yuri Topchy – guitar (9)
- Alexey Belyaev – bass, gusli, acoustic guitar (6)
- Kostya Kulikov – trumpet, flugelhorn, pipe, piano (12)
- Alexey Strelnikov – violin (3, 7)
- Dmitry Chepiga – violin (3, 7)
- Andrei Spiridonov – cello (3)
- Margarita Spiridonova – viola (3)
- Ekaterina Katomina – viola (7)
- Alexey Muromtsev – French horn (8)
- Sergei Pravdin – French horn (8)
- Andrei Lebedev – trombone (8)
- Orchestra of Cinematography conducted by Sergei Skripka: Mikhail Shestakov, Viktoria Ivashova, Olga Poludina, Grigory Airiyan, Vera Tyuvaeva, Violetta Tsarakhova, Svetlana Khersonskaya, Tamara Egorova, Yulia Shevareva, Lyudmila Borisenko, Evgeny Zeidman, Irina Ermakova, Evgeny Beloshitsky, Dragan Mirchich, Vladimir Brisev, Tatiana Dikan, Natalia Chesnokova, Tatiana Denisova, Valera Karpets, Vitaly Vitvitsky, Natalia Krylova, Alexander Khersonsky, Elena Yurku, Tatiana Guryanova, Vartan Darakchan, Eva Isaeva, Alexander Dober, Natalia Morozova, Avgustina Mikhailova, Sergei Aduev, Alexander Ermakov, Natalia Zhurkova, Alexey Isplatovkiy, Igor Sapozhinsky, Andrei Zharkov.
- Recording: Antti Uusimaki, Ann, Vladimir Ovchinnikov, Ilya Galushko, Sergei Bekker, Andrei Levin, Alexander Volodin, Oleg Chechik, Dasha Gubenko, Kostya Matafonov
- Vladimir Ovchinnikov – mastering

== Awards and nominations ==
Year	Award	Nominated work	Category and result	Result
2008	Muz-TV Award	Thank You	Best album	Nominated
2008	Muz-TV Award	We Are Crashing	Best song	Nominated
2008	Muz-TV Award	We Are Crashing	Best video	Nominated
2008	Rekord	Thank You	Female artist album	Nominated
2008	Stepnoy Volk	Thank You	Album	Won
2008	Chartova Dyuzhina	Thank You	Album	Nominated
2008	Chartova Dyuzhina	We Are Crashing	Song	Nominated
2008	Chartova Dyuzhina	We Are Crashing	Music	Won
2008	Chartova Dyuzhina	We Are Crashing	Video	Nominated
2008	Fuzz Award	Thank You	Best album	Nominated
2008	Fuzz Award	We Are Crashing	Best song	Nominated
2008	Rock Alternative Music Prize	Thank You	Best album of the year	Won

== Bibliography ==
- Alekseev, A. S. (2009). Кто есть кто в российской рок-музыке [Who's who in Russian rock music] (in Russian). М.: АСТ. pp. 183–186. ISBN 978-5-17-048654-0.
