= Eclectric =

Eclectric may refer to:

- Eclectric (Svoy album)
- Eclectric (Psy'Aviah album)
- Eclectric, an album by Chicago a cappella
