= Eclectric (Svoy album) =

Studio album by Svoy
- Released: December 13, 2005
- Recorded: 2003–2005
- Genre: Electronica, pop, alternative rock
- Length: 47:10 (U.S.); 54:55 (Japan)
- Label: Mack Avenue Records/Sony Music Entertainment (U.S.); Thistime Records (Japan)
- Producer: Svoy

Svoy chronology
Eclectric (2005)	Automatons (2009)

Alternative Cover
- Japan Edition Cover

Professional ratings
Review scores
Source	Rating
The Celebrity Cafe	9/10 stars
YouSuckIRule	(favorable)
Hybrid Magazine	(favorable)
Arjan Writes	(favorable)
Artist Direct	(favorable)
PopMatters	5/10 stars
TourDates.co.uk	(unfavorable)
antiMusic.com	(mixed)
Flake Records	(favorable)
Bounce Magazine	(favorable)
Music talks.	(7.3/10)

Eclectric is the first solo album by Svoy. It was originally released independently on December 13, 2005 on Svoy's Sixteenth Republic Records and later licensed, remastered, re-packaged and re-released May 1, 2007 by Rendezvous Entertainment/Universal Music Group to generally positive critical reviews. After Rendezvous' acquisition by Mack Avenue Records in August 2008, the album became part of the Mack Avenue/Sony Music Entertainment catalogue. As an import, the record gained substantial popularity in Japan and on July 8, 2009, was released by Tokyo-based Thistime Records as a 2-CD set featuring two bonus tracks on the first CD and Svoy's Consequence EP 1.0 on the second. Japan edition also featured new booklet with revised extended artwork and a separate slip with biography and lyrics translated into Japanese. In 2012, the master license to both Rendezvous/Mack Avenue and Thistime Records expired with the sound recording rights to the album reverting to Svoy. After a brief confrontation with the labels to cease distributing the album, Svoy remastered and re-released Eclectric internationally in the fall of the same year.

== Track listing ==
No.	Title	Writer(s)	Length
1.	"Driving Away"	Svoy	3:36
2.	"The Other Side"	Svoy	4:01
3.	"I Don't Love"	Svoy	3:27
4.	"On My Own"	Svoy	3:36
5.	"Make You Mine"	Svoy	3:45
6.	"Cared More"	Svoy	4:36
7.	"One Night Stand"	Svoy	4:11
8.	"Looking For You"	Svoy	4:06
9.	"Stronger Than Wind"	Svoy	4:08
10.	"Shy"	Svoy	7:31
11.	"Eclectric Unwinder"	Svoy	0:31
12.	"To What It Used To Be"	Svoy	4:21

Japan Bonus Tracks
No.	Title	Writer(s)	Length
13.	"Sadness Dwells"	Svoy, Daichi Miyata	2:33
14.	"Feel"	Svoy	5:12

== Personnel ==
- Svoy – keyboards, vocals, producer, programming, vocal arrangement, sound engineering, mixing, mastering (track 13, 14; 2012 remastered version), artwork revision (Japan edition; 2012 version)
- Myles D'Marco – guitar (track 7)
- A-ux – co-production (track 8)
- Steve Fallone – mastering
- Daichi Miyata – co-production (track 13)
- Shoshannah White – photography
- Kevin Reagan – art direction, design, photography, collages
- Lauren Taylor – design, collages, photography
- Dave Koz – executive producer
- Frank Cody – executive producer
- Hyman Katz – executive producer
- Jeff Chiang – product manager

== Release history ==
Region	Date	Label
United States	December 13, 2005	Mack Avenue Records/Sony Music Entertainment
United States	May 1, 2007	Mack Avenue Records/Sony Music Entertainment
Japan	July 8, 2009	Thistime Records
