= Forgive Me My Love =

Forgive Me My Love Прости Меня Моя Любовь

Studio album by Zemfira
- Released: 28 March 2000
- Recorded: Tone Studios, 2000
- Genres: Alternative rock Pop rock
- Length: 43:07
- Label: Real Records
- Producer: Vladimir Ovchinnikov

Zemfira chronology
Zemfira (1999)	Forgive Me My Love; Прости Меня Моя Любовь (2000)	14 Weeks of Silence (2002)

Forgive Me My Love (Russian: Прости Меня Моя Любовь) is Russian singer Zemfira's second album. It features the hit singles "Forgive Me My Love" and "You Want?". It further popularized her recognizable pop-rock sound. It became the best-selling Zemfira album with more than 1.5 million copies sold.

Professional ratings
Review scores
Source	Rating
Allmusic	(link)
Salon.com	link Archived 2002-06-08 at the Wayback Machine

== Track listing ==
1. "Шкалят Датчики" (Clipping Gauges)
2. "ZERO"
3. "Созрела" (Ripened)
4. "Хочешь?" (Do You Want?)
5. "Рассветы" (Dawns)
6. "Город" (City)
7. "Ненавижу" ([I] Hate)
8. "Сигареты" (Cigarettes)
9. "Доказано" (Proven)
10. "Прости Меня Моя Любовь" (Forgive Me My Love)
11. "Искала" ([I've] Searched)
12. "Не Отпускай" (Do Not Let Go)
13. "London" (bonus track)

== Personnel ==
- Zemfira - Vocals, Lyrics, Acoustic Guitar
- Sergei Sozinov - Drums
- Vadim Solov'ev - Guitar
- Rinat Akhmadiev - Bass
- Sergei Miroliubov - Keyboard, Percussion
- Vladimir Ovchinnikov "Tone Studios" Moscow - Recording
- Ray Staff "Whitfield Street Studio" - Mastering
- John Brough - Director
- Andrew Nichols - Assistant
