= Zemfira.Live =

Live album by Zemfira
- Released: 2006
- Genre: Rock, pop
- Length: 38:05
- Label: Real Records

Zemfira chronology
Vendetta (2005)	Zemfira.Live (2006)	песня "Мальчик" (2007)

Zemfira.Live is Zemfira's first live album, released on October 16, 2006. The album was recorded during the tour in support of the album Vendetta. It has sold 150,000 copies.

== Track listing ==
1. "Самолёт" (Airplane)
2. "Любовь как случайная смерть" (Love as accidental death)
3. "Блюз" (Blues)
4. "Повесица" (Hang myself)
5. "Ариведерчи" (Arrivederci)
6. "Дай мне Руку (Я Пожму её)" (Give Me Your Hand (I'll Shake it))
7. "Прости Меня Моя Любовь" (Forgive Me My Love)
8. "Главное" (The Main Thing)
9. "Мечтой" (Dream)
10. "Бесконечность" (Infinity)
