= 14 Weeks of Silence =

14 Weeks of Silence (Четырнадцать Недель Тишины)

Studio album by Zemfira
- Released: 1 April 2002
- Genre: Rock, Pop
- Length: 53:20
- Label: Sony Music Studios
- Producer: Zemfira Ramazanova

Zemfira chronology
| Forgive Me My Love (2000) | 14 Weeks of Silence (Четырнадцать Недель Тишины) (2002) | Vendetta (2005) |

14 Weeks of Silence is the third album by Russian singer Zemfira which became her second best-selling album after Forgive Me My Love with sales around 1 million copies sold in Russia and 500,000 sold in Ukraine according to her label. In comparison with her earlier albums it showcases softer and more polished sound, with prominent use of keyboards, inspired by work of such bands as Radiohead.

== Track listing ==
| No. | Title | In English | Length |
|---|---|---|---|
| 1. | "Паранойя" | Paranoia | 3:56 |
| 2. | "Трафик" | Traffic | 4:00 |
| 3. | "Бесконечность" | Infinity | 5:01 |
| 4. | "Мачо" | Macho | 4:17 |
| 5. | "Сказки" | Fairy tales | 4:36 |
| 6. | "Песня" | A song | 4:22 |
| 7. | "P." | R | 4:00 |
| 8. | "Главное" | The main thing | 3:32 |
| 9. | "Кто?" | Who? | 2:47 |
| 10. | "Webgirl" | Web girl | 4:09 |
| 11. | "Шалфей" | Sage | 3:31 |
| 12. | "Ощущенья" | Sensations | 4:12 |
| 13. | "Мечтой" | Dream | 3:45 |
