= Svoy =

Russian-American musician (born 1980)

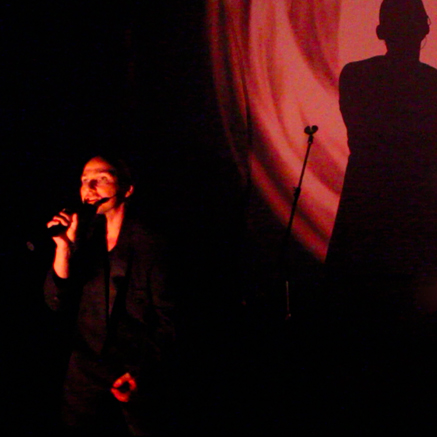

Background information
- Also known as: Misha Tarasov; Svoy
- Born: Mikhail Tarasov; 18 March 1980 (age 46)
- Origin: Vladivostok, Russian Federation
- Genres: Electronica; EDM; Alternative; Pop; Indie; Rock; Ambient; Jazz
- Occupations: Music producer singer songwriter poet keyboardist pianist visual artist
- Instruments: Vocals piano electronic keyboard digital audio workstation
- Years active: 2005–present
- Labels: Universal Music Group; Songs of Universal; Rendezvous Entertainment; Mack Avenue Records; P-Vine Records; Thistime Records
- Website: svoy.com

Mikhail Tarasov (Russian: Михаи́л Тара́сов), better known by his stage name Svoy (which can be loosely translated as "self-contained"), is an American producer/writer/artist for Universal Music Group in the genre of pop/electronica. He has seven self-produced albums and other records released via Mack Avenue Records/Sony Music Entertainment formerly known as Rendezvous Entertainment belonging to multi Grammy-nominated RIAA Gold-certified musician/media mogul Dave Koz and legendary radio chief executive/record producer Frank Cody, P-Vine Records/Blues Interactions, and Thistime Records. In 2024, he released a duo album in collaboration with Grammy-winning artist Kenny Garrett, entitled Who Killed AI?, on Mack Avenue Records.

== Career ==
In 2004, Svoy won the BMI John Lennon Award for songwriters and received the award from Yoko Ono.

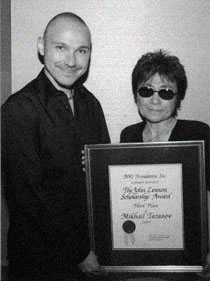
Svoy & Yoko Ono at BMI, NYC

In 2002, he won BMI Pete Carpenter Fellowship for film composers, that led to studying with multi Grammy and Emmy-winning composer Mike Post and Atli Orvarsson for one month at Post's studio in Los Angeles.

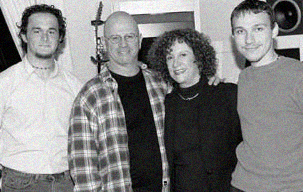
David LaChance, Mike Post, BMI's Linda Livingston & Svoy

It was the Sony Music Publishing executive, Eric Beall, who oversaw Svoy’s career at the beginning. In 2005, when Svoy came to Beall’s office at the Sony Tower in New York City to play a self-recorded demo, Beall told him to send it not only to publishing companies as a songwriter/producer, but also to labels as an artist: “This is a finished record quality”, Beall stated. Svoy followed the advice and within a year got the recording and the publishing contract, all negotiated by New York attorney George Gilbert, also recommended by Beall. Frank Cody and Dave Koz felt the same way when heard the album – they made a decision to release it on Rendezvous/Universal “as is”. To this day, all of Svoy’s records are entirely self-produced.

In 2009, his single "Beautiful Thing" reached No. 69 on the Billboard Japan Hot TOP 100 Airplay and No. 82 on Billboard Japan Hot 100 Singles chart. Besides remaining in top 40 and 100 airplay charts of numerous major Japanese radio networks for over 8 weeks, the song peaked at No. 3 on Alpha Station FM Kyoto 89.4's TOP 40 Overseas Chart. Also in 2009, Svoy's album Automatons reached No. 100 on the Billboard Japan Top Independent Albums and Singles chart.

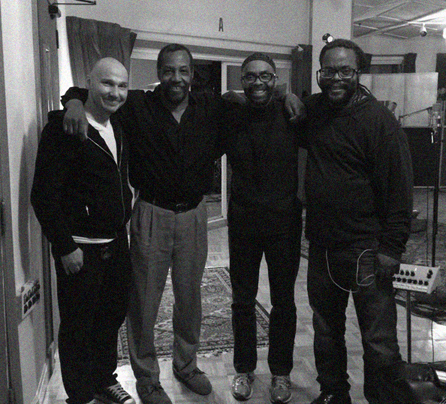
Svoy, Donald Brown, Kenny Garrett & Vernell Brown, Jr. at Sear Sound, NYC

In late 2012, Svoy collaborated on an electronic production/arrangement of a song with Grammy-winning singer-songwriter Meshell Ndegeocello and The Roots' bassist Mark Kelley for an upcoming album of jazz artist Claudia Acuna. In 2013, Svoy co-wrote a string arrangement with Kenny Garrett and made a vocalist appearance on Garrett’s multi Grammy-nominated albums, Pushing the World Away (2013) and Seeds from the Underground (2012), respectively. Song "I'm Breaking", written by Eurovision Music Awards-winning songwriter Demir Demirkan and Svoy, was released as part of Demirkan's 2019 album Elysium on Ashes.

In 2015, aside from continuing to release regular studio albums, Svoy began work on ongoing vocal electronic Symphony series and by 2019 has released five such pieces containing ten movements each.

Over the course of his career, Svoy has collaborated with Grammy-winning artists Kenny Garrett, Meshell Ndegeocello, Lenny White, Manuel Seal and Demir Demirkan, Claudia Acuna, Adam Levy, among other artists. Svoy is a voting member for The Recording Academy, a Yamaha Digital Artist, a Berklee College of Music and Gnessin Russian Academy of Music scholarship recipient/graduate.

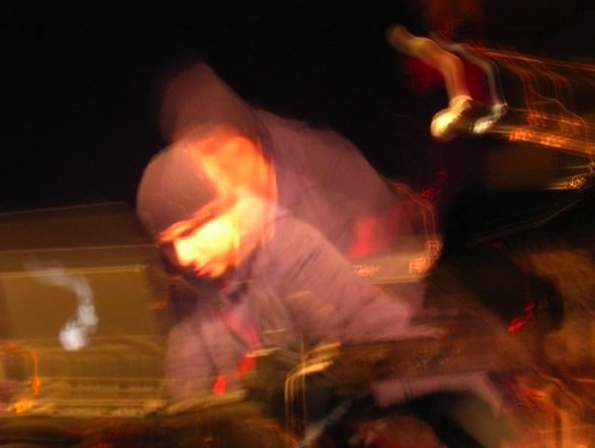
CBGB, NYC, 04.22.06

New York music critics Jack Rabid of The Big Takeover Magazine and Jesse Seilhan of TheCelebrityCafe.com describe Svoy as a "...Robot-driven repetitive-trance big-dance-rhythm cold synth-pop modern-chart soul futuristic electro-disco techno meister" and an artist who "...Is not afraid to explore" with Tower Records Japan dubbing him "...Electropop prince" and Timmy Kusnierek of YourEDM calling him "...One of the most accomplished", as well as his music "...An incredibly forward-thinking production that's beyond description". In addition, Meshell Ndegeocello described his music as "...Modern and moves".

Kenny Garrett & Svoy on the cover of DownBeat Magazine

In 2009, Svoy was granted a Green Card in the United States as an Alien of Extraordinary Ability and became a naturalized United States citizen in 2017. Svoy resides in New York City and Los Angeles.

== Influences ==
As a pianist/composer, Svoy is influenced by Lyle Mays and Chick Corea among others, while some of his influences as a songwriter/producer are Peter Gabriel, Meshell Ndegeocello, Depeche Mode, Sting, Maxwell, Boards of Canada and Prefuse 73.

== Personal life ==
Svoy identifies as an agnostic. He went to Berklee at the same time with Eric Andre, St. Vincent, Esperanza Spalding, Louis Cato, Christian Scott, Mark Kelly, Walter Smith III, Kendrick Scott among others.

== Discography ==
=== Solo albums ===
Year	Album	Chart peak positions
Year	Album	Japan Top Independent Albums and Singles
2005	Eclectric	-
2009	Automatons	100
2010	Et Al. (unreleased)	-
2011	Grow Up	-
2014	Lovedsolved	-
2017	Beautifulie	-
2020	Won	-

=== Collaboration albums ===
Year	Album	Chart peak positions
Year	Album	American Jazz Albums Chart
2024	Who Killed AI? with Kenny Garrett	-

=== Symphony albums ===
Year	Album
2015	Symphony No. 1: What Happened When I Was Asleep
2016	Symphony No. 2: Amurdeswa
2016	Symphony No. 3: 321
2018	Symphony No. 4: FRea
2019	Symphony No. 5: Tocktick

=== EPs ===
Year	Album
2009	Consequence EP 1.0
2012	Solved EP
2014	Lovedso EP

=== Compilations ===
Year	Album
2012	Yours, Svoy: The Best of 2005-2012

=== Singles ===
Year	Single	Peak chart positions		Album
Year	Single	Japan Hot 100 Airplay	Japan Hot 100 Singles	Album
2007	"Driving Away"	—	—	Eclectric
2009	"Beautiful Thing"	69	82	Automatons
2009	"I Don't Love (LIVE Acoustic)"			I Don't Love (LIVE Acoustic)
2011	"Never Grow Up"	—	—	Grow Up
2011	"Right Here, Right Now"	—	—	Grow Up
2012	"Navsegda"	—	—	Navsegda
2015	"Waiting for You"	—	—	Symphony No.1: What Happened When I Was Asleep

=== Collaborations ===
Year	Artist	Album	Credit
2012	Kenny Garrett	Seeds from the Underground	vocals
2013	Kenny Garrett	Pushing the World Away	string arrangement
TBA	Claudia Acuña	Futuro	co-production with Meshell Ndegeocello and Mark Kelley, keyboard & drum programming
2019	Demir Demirkan	Elysium on Ashes	co-write of the song "I'm Breaking"

=== Awards and nominations ===
Year	Result	Award	Category	Work
2002	Won	BMI Pete Carpenter Award	Film/TV Music	original instrumental composition
2004	Won	BMI John Lennon Award	Songwriting	original song
2003	Won	Berklee Performance Award	Jazz Piano	jazz piano performance
2011	Nominated	Independent Music Awards	Best Electronica/Dance Album	Automatons
2011	Won	Independent Music Awards	Best Electronica/Dance Song	Automatons
2011	Won	Independent Music Awards Vox Populi	Best Electronica/Dance Album	Automatons
2011	Won	Independent Music Awards Vox Populi	Best Electronica/Dance Song	Automatons
2024	Won	The AllMusic 2024 Year In Review	Favorite Jazz Albums	Who Killed AI?
