= Solved (EP) =

Solved EP

EP by Svoy
- Released: August 21, 2012
- Genre: Electronica, pop, alternative
- Length: 20:57
- Label: Svoy under license to Songs of Universal, a division of Universal Music Group, Inc.
- Producer: Svoy

Svoy chronology
Grow Up (2011)	Solved EP (2012)	Yours, Svoy: The Best of 2005-2012 (2012)

Professional ratings
Review scores
Source	Rating
TheCelebrityCafe.com	(mixed)
OKMusic.jp	3/5 stars

Solved is the second self-produced solo EP by Svoy. It was released internationally on August 21, 2012.

== Track listing ==
No.	Title	Writer(s)	Length
1.	"Run for Life"	Svoy	4:49
2.	"Tonight"	Svoy	3:58
3.	"Solved"	Svoy	4:55
4.	"Before"	Svoy	4:33
5.	"WIth You"	Svoy	2:44

== Personnel ==
- Svoy – keyboards, vocals, producer, programming, arrangement, sound engineering, mixing, mastering, art direction, design
