= Frank Cody =

American record producer

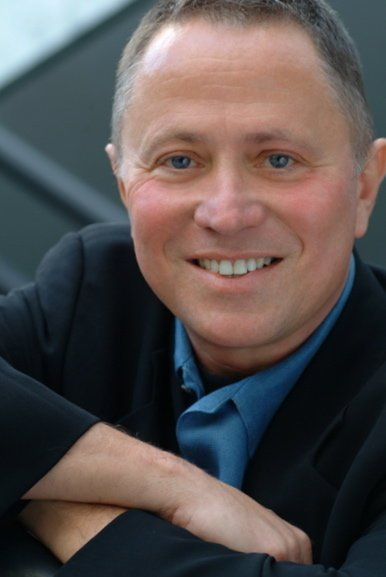
- Born: Francis R. Cody; June 13, 1948
- Died: July 19, 2023 (aged 75)
- Occupations: Record producer, Music Executive, Radio Executive
- Website: www.frankcody.com

Francis R. Cody (June 13, 1948 – July 19, 2023) was an American record producer, A&R and radio executive. Described by the R&R Magazine and The New York Times as "Smooth Jazz's Leading Alchemist" and "The Father of Smooth Jazz",

== Background ==
Cody is widely known for the development of Los Angeles-based pioneer Smooth Jazz radio station KTWV (94.7 MHz) "The WAVE". At various times, Cody served as an executive at NBC, ABC and was a co-founder/CEO of research/consulting firm Broadcast Architecture, later owned by Clear Channel. Along with music industry veteran Hyman Katz and multi Grammy-nominated RIAA Gold-certified recording artist Dave Koz, Cody founded record label Rendezvous Entertainment, releasing records by Wayman Tisdale, Jonathan Butler, Philippe Saisse, Svoy, earning Grammy Awards for Patti Austin and Kirk Whalum.
