= Zemfira (album) =

Studio album by Zemfira
- Released: 10 May 1999
- Recorded: Tone Studios, 1998
- Genre: Rock, pop
- Length: 47:14
- Label: DMI Records
- Producer: Vladimir Ovchinnikov

Zemfira chronology
| Zemfira (1999) | Forgive Me My Love (2000) |

Zemfira is the debut album by Russian rock singer Zemfira. It was released in May 1999 on DMI Records. The album sold over 700,000 copies in Russia.

== Track listing ==
1. "Почему" (Why)
2. "Снег" (Snow)
3. "Синоптик" (The Weatherman)
4. "Ромашки" (Daisies)
5. "Маечки" (Shirts)
6. "СПИД" (AIDS)
7. "Румба" (Rumba)
8. "Скандал" (Scandal)
9. "Не Пошлое" (Unplatitudinous)
10. "Припевочка" (Songstergirl)*
11. "-140"
12. "Ариведерчи" (Arrivederci)
13. "Ракеты" (Rockets)
14. "Земфира" (Zemfira)

*Here: means girl who is very easy to get along with. The song tells about problems of young couple, it contains lyrics such as: "He is your boy | You are his girl | He is a liar | Well, and you're not a songstergirl"

== Personnel ==
- Zemfira – Vocals, Lyrics, Music
- Sergei Cozinov – Drums and Percussion
- Oleg Pungin – Drums and Percussion
- Vadim Solov'ev – Guitar
- Yurii Tsaler – Guitar
- Rinat Akhmadiev – Bass
- Sergei Miroliubov – Keyboard
