= Adam Levy (musician) =

American jazz guitarist

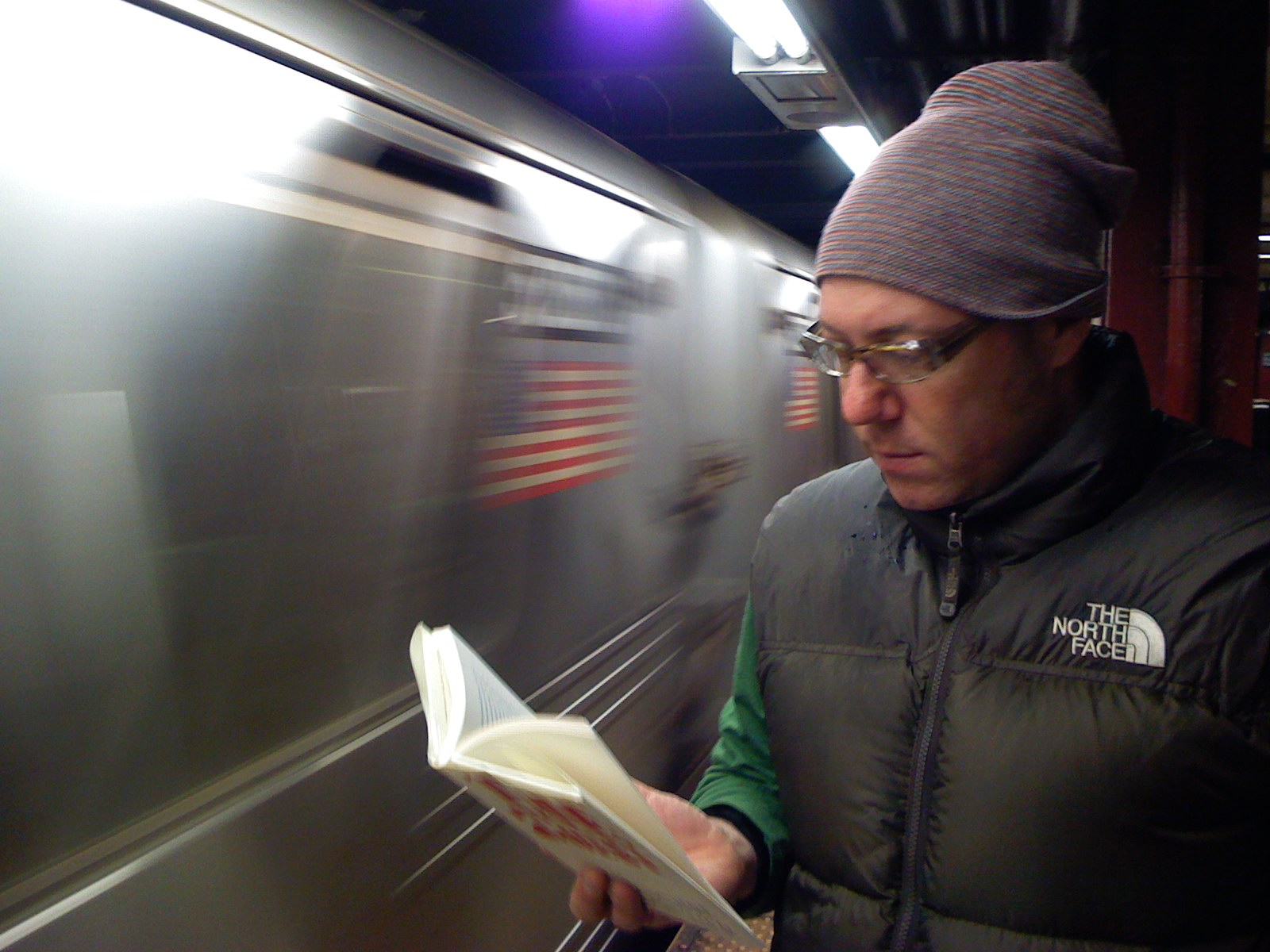
- Levy in 2007

Background information
- Born: November 27, 1966 (age 59); Encino, California, U.S.
- Genres: Jazz, pop, rock
- Occupations: Musician, singer, songwriter
- Instruments: Guitar, vocals
- Years active: 1990–present
- Label: Lost Wax
- Website: www.adamlevy.com

Adam Levy is an American jazz guitarist who was a member of Norah Jones' band.

== Career ==
Levy was born in Encino, California. Two of his uncles and one cousin played guitar, and his mother briefly took lessons. His grandfather, George Wyle, worked for The Andy Williams Show and The Flip Wilson Show on television as music director. As a teenager, Levy was a member of a local big band. After he graduated from high school, he studied at the Dick Grove School of Music, where his teachers included Ted Greene, Adam Levine and Jimmy Wyble.

He moved to San Francisco in 1990 and worked as a studio musician, appearing on a Tracy Chapman album in the mid 1990s. At the end of the decade, he was a member of the group Killer Joey with drummer Joey Baron, guitarist Steve Cardenas, and bassist Tony Scherr. Levy then moved to New York City, where he met Norah Jones and was a member of her band at the beginning of her career through her bestselling albums and world tours. He has also played with Rosanne Cash, Chris Difford, Amos Lee, and Lisa Loeb. He leads a trio called the Mint Imperials. He plays in a duo with session guitarist Rich Hinman.

Since 2015, Levy has been the Chair of the Guitar Performance department at Los Angeles College of Music.

== Discography ==
=== As leader ===
- Live at Avalaon & the Graves (Evander Music, 2000)
- Buttermilk Channel (Lost Wax Music, 2001)
- Get Your Glow On (Lost Wax, 2003)
- Loose Rhymes (Lost Wax, 2006)
- Washing Day (Lost Wax, 2007)
- The Heart Collector (Lost Wax, 2011)
- Spry (Lost Wax, 2023)

=== As sideman ===
With Norah Jones

- Come Away with Me (Blue Note, 2002)
- Feels Like Home (Blue Note, 2004)
- Not Too Late (Blue Note, 2006)

With others

- Tracy Chapman, New Beginning (Elektra 1995)
- Gordian Knot, Gordian Knot (Avalon, 1998)
- Trevor Dunn, Debutantes & Centipedes (Buzz 1998)
- Sex Mob, Din of Inequity (Columbia/Knitting Factory, 1998)
- Jenny Scheinman, The Rabbi's Lover (Tzadik, 2002)
- Leni Stern, Finally the Rain Has Come (Metalimbo, 2003)
- Amos Lee, Amos Lee (Blue Note, 2005)
- Nels Andrews, Off Track Betting (Ignatius, 2007)
- Noe Venable, The Summer Storm Journals (Petridish, 2007)
- Sean Malone, Cortlandt (Free Electric Sound 2007)
- Todd Sickafoose, Tiny Resistors (Cryptogramophone, 2008)
- Ana Egge, Road to My Love (Grace/Parkinsong, 2009)
- Svoy, Automatons (P-Vine, 2009)
- Amber Rubarth, A Common Case of Disappearing (Newsong, 2011)
- Anais Mitchell, Young Man in America (Wilderland, 2012)
- Shelley Segal, Little March (True Music, 2013)
- Billie Davies, 12 Volt (Cobra Basement, 2013)
- Noel Akchote, Gesualdo: Madrigals for Five Guitars (Blue Chopsticks, 2014)
- Allen Toussaint, American Tunes (Nonesuch, 2016)
- Chely Wright, I Am the Rain (Painted Red, 2016)
- Vulfpeck, The Beautiful Game (P-Vine, 2016)
- Son of the Velvet Rat, Dorado (Fluff and Gravy, 2017)
- Mel Parsons, Glass Heart (Cape Road 2018)
- Meshell Ndegeocello, Ventriloquism (Naive, 2018)
- Mike Love, Reason for the Season (BMG, 2018)
- Rosanne Cash, She Remembers Everything (Blue Note, 2018)
- The O'Jays, The Last Word (S-Curve 2019)
- Lisa Loeb, A Simple Trick to Happiness (Furious Rose, 2020)
- Rufus Wainwright, Unfollow the Rules (BMG, 2020)

== Bibliography ==
- Jazz Guitar Sight-Reading (Alfred Music, 1997)
- Play the Right Stuff – Creating Great Guitar Parts, (Alfred Music, 2006), DVD & online course
- 50 Low Down Rhythms You Must Know, (Truefire, 2013), DVD & online course
- Rhythm Makeover with Adam Levy, (Truefire, 2014), DVD & online course
- Essentials: Slow Burn Soloing – Introduction (Truefire, 2015), DVD & online course
- Guitar Tips YouTube series
