= Rendezvous Music =

- Parent company: Mack Avenue Records
- Founded: 2002
- Founder: Dave Koz, Frank Cody, Hyman Katz
- Status: Active
- Distributor(s): Sony Music Entertainment
- Genre: Jazz; Electronica; Chill; Singer-songwriter
- Country of origin: United States
- Location: Los Angeles, CA
- Official website: www.rendezvousmusic.com

Rendezvous Music (formerly known as Rendezvous Entertainment) is a record label founded by multiple-Grammy Award nominee and RIAA Certified Gold recording artist Dave Koz, radio entrepreneur Frank Cody and music business veteran Hyman Katz in 2002. At various times, the label has been distributed by Sony Music Entertainment's Red Distribution and Universal Music Group's Fontana Distribution. In 2008, artist Patti Austin received her first Grammy Award for album Avant Gershwin released on Rendezvous Entertainment in 2007. In 2011, artist Kirk Whalum received his first Grammy Award for song "It's What I Do" (feat. Lalah Hathaway) from album The Gospel According to Jazz Chapter III released on Rendezvous Music in 2010. Since its acquisition in August 2008, Rendezvous is part of the Mack Avenue Records label group and continues to release new music by Kirk Whalum, Jonathan Butler, Kyle Eastwood as well as previously unreleased music by Wayman Tisdale.

== List of Rendezvous artists ==
- Adani & Wolf
- Brian Simpson
- Camiel
- Jonathan Butler
- Kirk Whalum
- Kyle Eastwood
- Marc Antoine
- Michael Lington
- Patti Austin
- Peanuts Whalum
- Philippe Saisse
- Praful
- Svoy
- Wayman Tisdale
