= Kevin Reagan =

American graphic designer

- Occupations: Artist, Graphic Designer
- Known for: Album cover

Kevin Reagan is an American graphic designer/art director. He has created artwork for the albums Ray of Light and Music by Madonna and Home by Dixie Chicks, for each of which he won the Grammy Award for Best Recording Package. He is the author of Alex Steinweiss, The Inventor of the Modern Album Cover (2009, Taschen).
