= Yuri Tsaler =

Russian musician (born 1973)

Yuri Tsaler Юрий Цалер
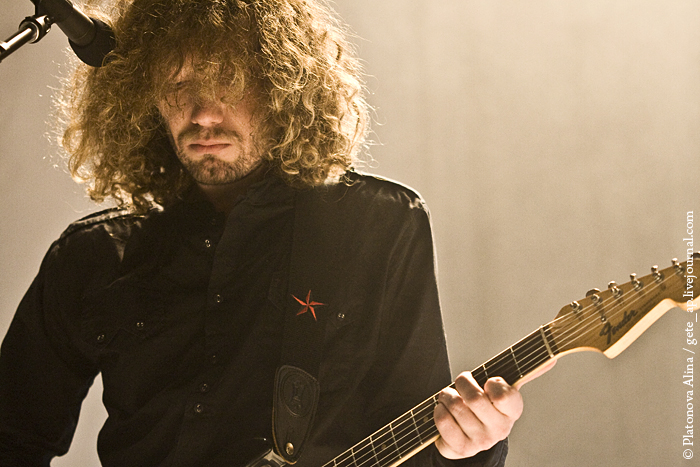
- Tsaler in 2009

Background information
- Born: 22 May 1973 (age 52); Pervouralsk, Russian SFSR, Soviet Union
- Genres: Rock, pop
- Occupation: Musician
- Instruments: Guitar, piano, vocals

Yuriy Alexandrovich Tsaler (Russian: Юрий Александрович Цалер; 22 May 1973) is a Russian musician playing on lead guitar in the band Mumiy Troll.

He studied piano at the Tchaikovsky Music Academy, then worked in a bread factory.

He performed with his father, a well-known jazzman, before chequered audiences in bars renowned as the local hangout for gangsters. Later, he joined the group, Ptitsa Zu.

When the group disbanded due to the death of their bassist, he moved to Moscow where he worked with Pavel Kashin.

In 1997, he received an offer to join Mumiy Troll, through Ilia Kormiltsev, to whom he gave guitar lessons. He has been a member of the group since the fall 1997. In December 2005 he has re-released an album of band "Ptitsa Zu".
