= Mumiy Troll =

Russian rock band

Mumiy Troll Мумий Тролль
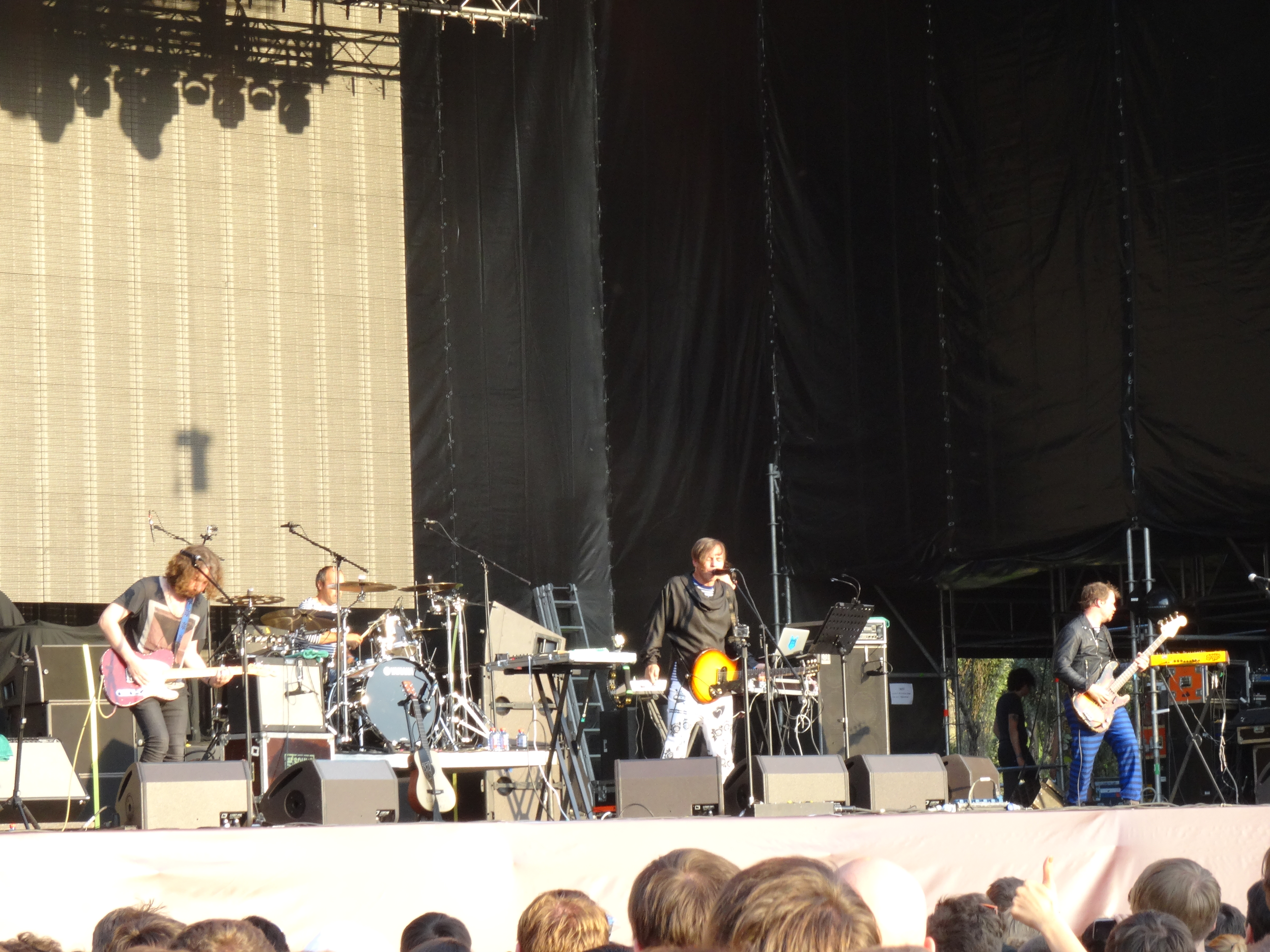
- Mumiy Troll performing in 2013

Background information
- Origin: Vladivostok/Moscow, Russia
- Genres: Rock, alternative rock, indie rock, britpop
- Years active: 1983–1987; 1989–1990; 1996–present
- Labels: Warner; Atlantic
- Members: Ilya Lagutenko; Oleg Pungin; Alexander Kholenko; Artyom Kritsin; Pavel Vovk
- Past members: Yuri Tsaler; Eugene "Sdwig" Zvidionny; Olesya Lyashenko; Denis Transkiy
- Website: Official site

Mumiy Troll (Russian: Му́мий Тро́лль [ˈmumʲɪj ˈtrolʲ]) is a Russian rock group, founded in 1983 in Vladivostok by vocalist and songwriter Ilya Lagutenko (Russian: Илья Лагутенко). The name is a pun on Mumintroll, the children's books by Tove Jansson, translated into Russian as "Mummi Troll".

== Career ==
Ilya Lagutenko founded Mumiy Troll in Vladivostok on 16 October 1983. In 1985, the group recorded their first album, Novaya luna aprelya, which was distributed as magnitizdat.

Mumiy Troll disbanded when Lagutenko was conscripted into the Russian navy. In 1990, they briefly reunited and released their second album, Delay Yu-Yu, on tape. Having studied Chinese and English at the Oriental Studies Institute of the Far Eastern Federal University, Lagutenko worked in China and London from 1991 to 1995. In 1995, he returned to Russia and reformed the band.

In May 1997, Mumiy Troll released their first studio album, Morskaya (Russian: «Морская», lit. 'Marine'), which brought them wide popularity. Six months later, they released their second studio album, Ikra (Russian: «Икра», lit. 'Caviar'). In 1998, MTV began broadcasting in Russia and Mumiy Troll's music video for the song "Vladivostok 2000" was the first music video by a Russian artist shown on the channel.

In 2001, the group represented Russia in the Eurovision Song Contest and came in 12th place. Time Out (London) wrote that they 'stole the show' by standing out as snakeskin heroes amongst all the taffeta and tuxedos.

The group wrote and produced soundtracks for a full-length cartoon movie and gave a new sound to classic Russian silent sci-fi movie and donated tracks to feature films including Russian blockbuster Night Watch, where Lagutenko also plays the Vampire. His face is on the cover of the American release.

Their 2005 album Sliyaniye i pogloshcheniye (Russian: Слияние и Поглощение, lit. 'Merger and Acquisition') was called back from the printers on the day of release when distributors realized that the bride and groom on the cover were wearing masks of Putin and Mikhail Khodorkovsky. The band changed them into symbols of hearts and United States dollars respectively. In 2008, the band signed with the Agency Group. In 2009, they released the album Comrade Ambassador, their first album to be made commercially available in North America, and toured North America to promote it. In 2012, Mumiy Troll released their first English-language album, Vladivostok.

In 2013, they released the album SOS matrosu (Russian: SOS матросу, lit. 'SOS to the Sailor'), written during the band's round-the-world trip on a 19-century sailing ship in locations.

In 2015, they released album Piratskie kopii (Russian: Пиратские копии, lit. 'Pirate Copies') and in 2016, the English-language album Malibu Alibi.

In 2011, the first Mumiy Troll Music Bar was opened in Vladivostok. In 2015, Lagutenko opened a second Mumiy Troll Music Bar in Moscow.

The group has participated in various international festivals and music conferences, including SXSW, Culture Collide, Zandari Festa, Mu:Con, Sound City, and Visual Japan Summit. In 2013, they founded their own showcase festival "Vladivostok Rocks" (V-ROX). The festival was dubbed "a small Pacific Woodstock" by Russia Beyond The Headlines. V-ROX was held annually from 2013 to 2019. The 2020 edition of the festival was postponed due to the COVID-19 pandemic.

Mumiy Troll was the first to support the activities of PSI organization fighting AIDS in Russia and performed at the No Name Fever exhibition for AIDS in Gothenburg, Sweden in 2005. They are also well known for conservation activities on wild life in Far-East taiga and helping local minorities to survive. Ilya Lagutenko is a patron of the British-Russian Amur fund for the protection of Amur tigers and leopards.

In 2022, the group condemned the Russian invasion of Ukraine and, as a result, had all their concerts in Russia canceled by the authorities.

== Style ==
Lagutenko lived in London in the 1990s and was influenced by the Britpop scene at the time. Lagutenko has described the band's style as "rockapops."

== Members ==
- Ilya Lagutenko – lead vocals, guitar, keyboard, acoustic guitar, tambourine
- Oleg Pungin – drums
- Alexander Kholenko – keyboards
- Artyom Kritsin – guitar
- Pavel Vovk – bass guitar

== Discography ==
- 1985 – Novaya luna aprelya (Russian: «Новая луна апреля», lit. 'New April Moon')
- 1990 – Delay Yu-Yu (Russian: Делай Ю-Ю, lit. 'Do Yu-Yu')
- 1997 – Morskaya (Russian: Морская, lit. 'Nautic')
- 1997 – Ikra (Russian: Икра, lit. 'Caviar')
- 1998 – Shamora – pravda o Mumiyakh i Trollyakh (Russian: Шамора. Правда о Мумиях и Троллях, lit. 'Shamora: The Truth About Mummies and Trolls')
- 1998 – S novym godom, Kroshka! (Russian: С Новым Годом, Крошка!, lit. 'Happy New Year, Baby!')
- 2000 – Tochno rtut' aloe (Russian: Точно Ртуть Алоэ, lit. 'Just Like Mercury Aloe Is')
- 2002 – Meeamury (Russian: Меамуры, lit. 'Meamurs')
- 2004 – Pohititeli knig (Russian: Похитители Книг, lit. 'The Book Thieves')
- 2005 – Sliyaniye i pogloshcheniye (Russian: Слияние и Поглощение, lit. 'Merger and Acquisition')
- 2007 – Amba (Russian: Амба)
- 2008 – 8
- 2009 – Comrade Ambassador – US release (in Russian)
- 2010 – Paradise Ahead – US EP Release
- 2012 – Vladivostok
- 2013 – SOS matrosu (Russian: SOS матросу, lit. 'SOS to the Sailor')
- 2015 – Piratskie kopii (Russian: Пиратские копии, lit. 'Pirate Copies')
- 2016 – Malibu Alibi
- 2016 – #31E
- 2018 – Vostok X Severozapad (Russian: Восток Х Северозапад, lit. 'East X Northwest')
- 2020 – Prizraki Zavtra (Russian: Призраки Завтра, lit. 'Ghosts of Tomorrow')
- 2020 – Posle zla (Russian: После зла, lit. 'After evil')

== Awards ==
Award	Year	Nominee(s)	Category	Result	Ref.
MTV Europe Music Awards	2001	Themselves	Best Russian Act	Nominated	
MTV Video Music Awards	1999	"Ранетка"	Viewer's Choice	Nominated	
MTV Video Music Awards	2000	"Без обмана"	Viewer's Choice	Nominated	
MTV Video Music Awards	2001	"Моя певица"	Viewer's Choice	Nominated	
Russian Flash Awards	2006	"Страху нет"	Animation	Won	
ZD Awards	1997	Themselves	Group of the Year	Nominated	
ZD Awards	1997	Ilya Lagutenko	Male Artist of the Year	Won	
ZD Awards	1998	Ilya Lagutenko	Male Artist of the Year	Nominated	
ZD Awards	1998	Themselves	Group of the Year	Nominated	
ZD Awards	1998	Themselves	Rock Act of the Year	Nominated	
ZD Awards	1999	Themselves	Rock Act of the Year	Won	
ZD Awards	1999	Themselves	Group of the Year	Nominated	
ZD Awards	2000	Themselves	Hall of Fame	Won	
ZD Awards	2003	Themselves	Rock Group of the Year	Nominated	
ZD Awards	2003	Themselves	Disappointment of the Year	Nominated	
ZD Awards	2003	Ilya Lagutenko	Male Artist of the Year	Nominated	
ZD Awards	2007	Амба	Album of the Year	Nominated	
ZD Awards	2007	Themselves	Group of the Year	Nominated	
ZD Awards	2008	Themselves	Group of the Year	Nominated	
ZD Awards	2008	Themselves	Rock Act of the Year	Nominated	
ZD Awards	2008	Ilya Lagutenko	Artist of the Year	Nominated	
ZD Awards	2008	8	Album of the Year	Nominated	
ZD Awards	2008	"Контрабанды"	Video of the Year	Nominated	
ZD Awards	2009	Themselves	Group of the Year	Nominated	
ZD Awards	2009	С новым годом!	Concert of the Year	Won	
ZD Awards	2010	Themselves	Group of the Year	Won	
ZD Awards	2010	Themselves	Rock Act of the Year	Nominated	
ZD Awards	2010	Ilya Lagutenko	Artist of the Year	Nominated	
ZD Awards	2010	Редкие земли	Album of the Year	Nominated	
ZD Awards	2010	Live in Olympic Stadium	Concert of the Year	Nominated	
ZD Awards	2011	Live in Olympic Stadium	Concert of the Year	Nominated	
ZD Awards	2011	Ilya Lagutenko	Artist of the Year	Nominated	
ZD Awards	2011	Ilya Lagutenko	Male Artist of the Year	Nominated	
ZD Awards	2012	World Tour	Event of the Year	Nominated	
ZD Awards	2012	Themselves	Rock Group of the Year	Won	
ZD Awards	2013	Themselves	Rock Group of the Year	Won	
ZD Awards	2014	Themselves	Rock Group of the Year	Nominated	
ZD Awards	2015	Themselves	Rock Group of the Year	Nominated	
ZD Awards	2015	Пиратские копии	Album of the Year	Nominated	
ZD Awards	2017	Themselves	Rock Act of the Year	Nominated	
ZD Awards	2017	Морская. 20	Concert of the Year	Nominated	
ZD Awards	2018	Вечерний чай	Concert of the Year	Nominated	
ZD Awards	2018	Themselves	MegaBeat Award	Won	
ZD Awards	2019	Themselves	MegaBeat Award	Nominated	
ZD Awards	2020	Themselves	Group of the Year	Nominated	
ZD Awards	2020	Themselves	Innovator of the Year	Nominated	
ZD Awards	2020	После зла	Album of the Year	Nominated	
ZD Awards	2020	"Космические Силы"	Video of the Year	Nominated	
ZD Awards	2020	Ртуть Алоэ VR	Concert of the Year	Nominated	
Поколение Video Festival	1998	"Дельфины"	Best Shot	Won	

- 1997 The Best Still Image 1996 for Utekai (Slip Away) – the award from the Pokolenie Video Festival.
- 1997 The Best Rock Group 1997 – Ovation prize from the Russian Music Academy.
- 1997 The Best Group 1997, The Best Album 1997 for Morskaya (Nautical), The Best Song 1997 for Utekai (Slip Away), The Best Group 1998, The Best Video 1998 for Delfiny (Dolphins), The Best Video 1999 for Nevesta? (Bride?), The Best Musical Site 1999 – Russian music magazine Fuzz prize
- November 2002 Golden Disk according to the Meamories album sales in Latvia.
- 2002 Zolotoy Grammofon (Golden Gramophone) premium (for the most popular song at Russkoe Radio in 2002) was awarded for the song Eto po lyubvi (Based on Love).
- 2002 The Best Group 2002, The Best Song 2002 for Eto po lyubvi (Because of love) – the Poboroll prize from Nashe Radio.
- May 2004 Golden Disk according to the Pohititeli Knig album sales in Latvia.
- 2005 The Best Album 2005 for Sliyanie i Pogloshenie (Merger and Acquisition) – Russian music magazine Fuzz prize.
- 2006 For the contribution to rock-art – Russian music magazine Fuzz prize.
- 2006 Legend of MTV – MTV Russia Music Awards.
- 2008 The Best Album 2008 – Mumiy Troll, «8» – Chartova Duzhina
- 2008 The Best Music 2008 – Mumiy Troll, Contrabands – Chartova Duzhina
- 2008 Internet 2008 – Mumiy Troll, www.mumiytroll.com – Steppe Wolf
- 2008 CD 2008 – Mumiy Troll, «8» – Steppe Wolf
- 2009 The Best Group 2009 – Mumiy Troll – Chartova Duzhina

Awards and achievements
Preceded by Alsou with "Solo"	Russia in the Eurovision Song Contest; 2001	Succeeded by Prime Minister with "Northern Girl"
