= Afisha Picnic =

Outdoor festival held in Moscow, Russia

Afisha Picnic Festival Пикник «Афиши»
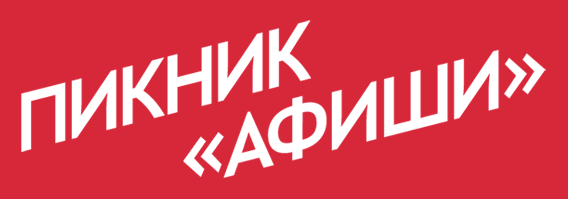
- Genre: Indie rock, indie pop, indietronica, alternative rock
- Dates: Late July
- Locations: Moscow, Russia
- Years active: 2005 - present
- Website: Afisha Picnic official website

The Afisha Picnic was a one-day outdoor festival held in Moscow, Russia, every summer. It takes place on the territory of Kolomenskoye, a former tsar's estate, now a state-owned historical, architectural and nature reserve museum, located 10 kilometres (6.2 mi) south-east of the city center. Since its start in 2004, the Afisha Picnic has followed the concept that mixes professional music festival featuring performances of international artists and local independent musicians, and urban-style event with all sorts of entertainment, such as designers’ market, gastronomic area, games and crafts, sports and amusements, lectures and workshops, and, on one occasion, even a dance floor on the rollerdrome. The festival is visited by 50,000 visitors that spread out over 1,000 acres (4.0 km^{2}) of land.

The festival was cancelled in 2020 and 2021 due to the COVID-19 pandemic and in 2022 due to the Russian invasion of Ukraine (2022–present).

== Stages ==
Music is the key element of the festival. The number of stages varies each year: there are a few main stages that host live acts and, depending on which up-to-date trends in music and contemporary culture are in the spotlight, a number of additional stages. The Main Stage features big international and Russian acts. Some headliners that performed at the Afisha Picnic are Courtney Love and Hole, Madness, Amanda Palmer, Kaiser Chiefs, Jamiroquai, The Future Sound of London, Marina and the Diamonds, MGMT, M83, Calla, Sons and Daughters, Buck 65, Beirut, Dengue Fever, Clinic, Múm, Dälek, Junior Boys, Martina Topley-Bird, DeVotchKa, Black Lips, The Teenagers, Someone Still Loves You Boris Yeltsin, HushPuppies and These New Puritans. Other stages showcase cutting edge indie and electronic performances, and feature a wide spectrum of genres from synth-pop, electro and disco to hip-hop and experimental electronica. Among headliners who have appeared on the other Afisha Picnic stages are Peaches, Tennis, Rainbow Arabia, Lo-Fi-Fnk, Shy Child, The Wombats, New Young Pony Club, Late of the Pier, Chromatics, Glass Candy, Minitel Rose, Fan Death and Telepathe.

== Alcohol policy ==
Alcohol is not sold or poured out anywhere at the Afisha Picnic, and it is forbidden to take alcoholic beverages to the festival. The festival follows a strict policy of not allowing any commercial sponsorship by companies that sell or produce alcohol or tobacco. This is done on purpose, to serve as an alternative to traditional rock festivals as well as to keep the festival accessible and safe for a wide audience, including teenagers and families with children.

== Going international ==
The Afisha Picnic is expanding each year, attracting a wider audience from all over Russia, and more attention from both the local and foreign media. With the breadth and caliber of programming across music and leisure continually diversifying, and the introduction of English navigation in 2010, Afisha Picnic is also strengthening its presence on the international arena of live music and festival industry. In 2011, a full bilingual version of the festival website was introduced.

== History ==
=== 2000s ===
2004

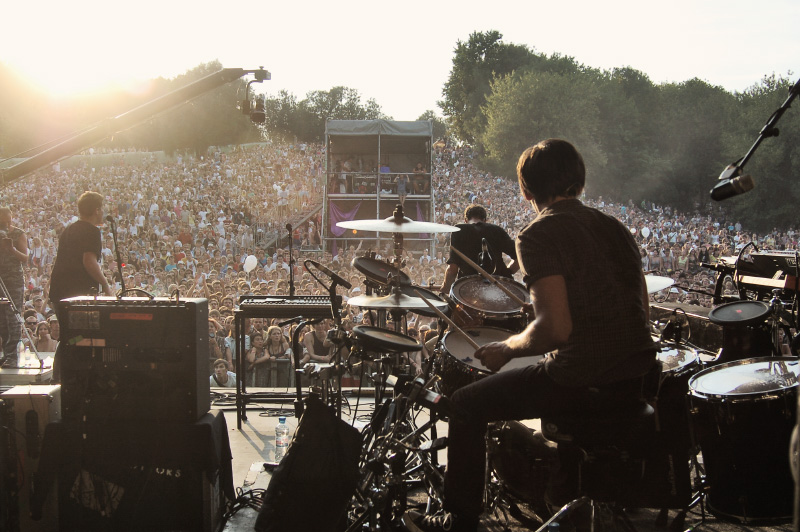
Editors performance

May 15, front alley of Luzhniki Stadium

Visited by 10,000 people.

Headliners: The Future Sound of London (UK), Laska Omnia (UK), Igor Vdovin (Russia), Foto Moto (Ukraine)

Special Memories: the first festival celebrated the five-year anniversary of the Afisha Magazine with one music stage and the first independent designers’ market in Moscow.

2005
July 30, Krasnaya Presnya park

Visited by 20,000 people.

Headliners: Sons and Daughters (UK), M83 (France), Žagar (Hungary), Magyar Posse (Finland), Markscheider Kunst (Russia), Esthetic Education (Ukraine), Netslov (Russia)

Special Memories: the theatre stage hosted experimental drama, contemporary dance and poetry readings, street orchestras performed on the park alleys, open cinema with FutureShorts and Soviet cartoons, the Thai massage bar, the hair design saloon, telescopes, masterclasses on graffiti, the Race Ground for karting and radio-controlled cars.

Special services: the wi-fi zone from Intel, the photo booths from Epson.

2006
July 29, Krasnaya Presnya park

Visited by 23,000 people.

Headliners: Calla (US), Buck 65 (Canada), Beirut (US), Dengue Fever (US), The Pinker Tones (Spain), Punk TV (Russia), Mujuice (Russia), Ska-Jazz Review (Russia), Messerchups (Russia)

Special Memories: old school djs dominating the Picnic dance scene with DJ Woody (UK), The Nextmen & MC Kwasi (UK), DJ Lucia P (Brazil), Epik Soundsystem (Russia) and Flammable Beats (Russia), that performed on two dance floors Guerilla Dances and Barge, the last one located on a real barge tied up to the bank of Moscow river front of the park, a stage with baroque music from the Saint Petersburg Earlymusic festival, short films from the Clermont-Ferrand International Short-film Festival, master-classes on pottery and glass-blowing.

Special Services: Rasta bikes for rent and bicycle parking, free wi-fi from Golden Telecom.

2007
July 28, Kolomenskoe

Visited by 50,000 people.

Headliners: Múm (Iceland), Junior Boys (Canada), Someone Still Loves You Boris Yeltsin (US), HushPuppies (France), Clinic (UK), Dälek (US), Mumiy Troll (Russia), Mujuice (Russia), Flëur (UKR).

Special Memories: nu-rave, a newly born music style, is celebrated with the appearance of Lo-Fi-Fnk (Sweden), Shy Child (US) and Russian acts such as Yogo-Yogo, a movie pavilion with premiere screening Zidane: A 21st Century Portrait documentary and cartoons from 2×2, the Pink Paradise beauty zone with spa, massage and pink fur on the floor, Nintendo Wii tournament, old Soviet gaming machines and squirt guns.

2008
July 19, Kolomenskoye

Visited by 50,000 people.

Headliners: DeVotchKa (US), Black Lips (US), Martina Topley-Bird (UK), The Teenagers (France), Dúné (Denmark), Late of the Pier (UK), Chromatics (US), Glass Candy (US), Leningrad (Russia), Dolphin (Russia), Peter Nalitch (Russia).

Special Memories: a record-breaking number of music stages and dance floors such as the Red Bull Music Academy, the Disco Rollerdrome, the Swimming Pool, the Dj School, as well as two internet-bars with free wi-fi and djs and a lecture hall.

2009
August 8, Kolomenskoye

Visited by 43,000 people.

Headliners: Madness (UK), Amanda Palmer (US), These New Puritans (UK), Kasta (RUS), Fan Death (US), Telepathe (US), Minitel Rose (France)

Special Memories: the first lomography exhibition in Russia organized by the Lomographic Society International, two lecture halls by the British Council and the edutainment web-site Theory and Practice, Charity Village that raised funds for various charity organizations with a special program of WWF eco-shorts, Kite festival, the largest twister in the history of Russia, wakeboarding and kicker tournaments, Paharganj Indian market with yoga classes, Bollywood films, etc.

Special Services: interactive navigation for Nokia N97 и 5800 XpressMusic, free internet from Yota, Motortaxi / free scooter transportation organized by Clevermoto.

=== 2010s ===
2010
July 31, Kolomenskoye

Headliners: Editors (UK), Hercules and Love Affair (USA), Metronomy (UK), Roots Manuva (UK), Music Go Music (UK), Janelle Monáe (US), Javelin (US), Mumiy Troll plays Ikra album (Russia), Auktyon (Russia), Megapolis (Russia)

2011
July 23, Kolomenskoye

Headliners: Courtney Love and Hole (USA), Kaiser Chiefs (UK), Peaches (USA) Marina and the Diamonds (UK), Rainbow Arabia (USA), Zemfira (Russia), Bravo (Russia), Mujuice (Russia).

Other performing musicians: Tennis (USA), Tamaryn (USA), The Wombats (UK), Motorama (Russia), New Young Pony Club (UK), CocknBullKid (UK), Sansara (Russia), Padla Bear Outfit (Russia), KAMP! (Poland), Manicure (Russia), Zorge (Russia), L.Stadt, On-The-Go (Russia), Moremoney (Russia), Miiisha (Russia), Friends of the Oval (USA), Narkotiki (Russia), Piano Boy (Russia), 19:84 (Russia), Cheese People (Russia), Meeting Fish (Russia), Xuman (Russia), Ifwe (Russia), Brandenburg (Russia), The :Paisley (Russia), Coockoo (Russia), The Retuses (Russia).

Special Memories: Topman Big Gig stage, DMT Stage inspired by the project 'Delay Menya Tocho' - afisha.ru paying tribute to Mumiy Troll, Nestea Swimming Pool, extended Market area hosting more than a hundred shops and labels, Alfa Paradiso Beach - an island with Brazilian dancers and colonial-style cafe, Kids town 'V Lesu', best mono-performances by Praktika Theatre, The Pavilion "Olympic Britain" by British Council, Barbecue quarter, comprehensive talks from Polytechnical Museum covering a wide range of topics, Kenzo Wild House. Poland was a special guest at the Afisha Picnic 2011.

With organizers hailing the biggest crowds yet at the festival, Afisha Picnic has established itself as a don’t-miss event for any serious Moscow culture vulture. And the 2011 edition completed the event’s transformation from self-consciously ‘alternative’ to musical behemoth, creating a vibe more closely associated with the likes of Glastonbury

2012
July 21, 2012 in Kolomenskoye.

Headliners: Pet Shop Boys, Franz Ferdinand, Mika, Little Boots, Lauryn Hill, Mos Def, Fuck Buttons, Theophilus London, The Drums.

Other performing musicians: Aquarium, Messer Chups, Pompeya, Motorama, Stoned Boys, The Retuses, NRKTK, Oxxxymiron, The Melodies and Jack Wood.

Other Festival areas, stages and entertainment zones include: Market, Food Court, Polytechnical Museum Lecture Hall, EKSMO Open-air Library, Nestea Swimming Pool, Nintendo Mega Playground, HP Cool Capsules, Sony PlayStation field, Promsvyazbank Social Hub, and Coca-Cola Summer Beat stage.

2013
July 13, 2013 in Kolomenskoye.

Headliners: Blur, Bat for Lashes, Buzzcocks, La Roux, Splean, Aloe Blacc, George Clinton.

Other performing musicians: Sonic Death, Kira Lao, Tesla Boy, Glintshake, Jon Hopkins, L’One and others.

2014
July 19, 2014 in Kolomenskoye.

Headliners: Jamiroquai, Suede, MGMT, Glintshake, Sohn, Astronautalis

Other performing musicians: The Soul Surfers, On-The-Go, SBPCh, Therr Maitz, Myron & E, Kasta, Talib Kweli, Mulatu Astatke

2015
July 25, 2015 in Kolomenskoye.

Hedliners: Земфира, Hot Chip, Ivan Dorn, The Horrors, SBPCh, Nike Borzov, Kiesza

Summer Stage by Skoda The Gaslamp Killer, Mujuice, Scriptonite, Oddisee & Good Company, МОТ, BMB SpaceKid feat. MC CHECK, Mana Island, True Flavas

2016
July 30, 2016 in Kolomenskoye.

Main stage: The Chemical Brothers, Leningrad, Benjamin Clementine, Oxxxymiron, Neon Indian, Temples, Omar Souleyman

Summer Stage by S7: Skepta, Adrian Younge, Mujuice, Tesla Boy, Shawn Lee and the Soul Surfers, Manizha, Ne Tvoe Delo

Local Stage by Mastercard: Race To Space, Alyona Toymintseva, Naadya, Gayana

2017
July 29, 2017 in Kolomenskoye.

Main stage: Kasabian, Foals, Griby, Everything Everything, ГШ

Summer stage: A$AP Ferg, Luna, Husky, Orlando Julius & The Heliocentrics, Kito Jempere, On-The-Go, The Great Revivers

Air stage: 5'NIZZA, Antoha MC, ABRA, Constantine and others

2018
August 4, 2018 in Kolomenskoye.

Arcade Fire, Zemfira, Belle and Sebastian, Dolphin, King Gizzard & the Lizard Wizard, Monetochka, Rhye, AIGEL

2019
August 3, 2019 in Kolomenskoye.

Main stage: The Cure, Royal Blood, Pusha T, Mura Masa, Blossoms, SBPCh, Dayte tank (!), Eighteen, Antoha MC, Kazuskoma

Gazgolder Live stage: Basta, T-Fest, Gruppa Skryptonite, Matrang, Smoki Mo, Lucaveros, Vadyara Blues

== Other facts ==
In 2009, the film Stages (Uffe Truust, 2009), a documentary about the Danish band Dúné, was presented at the Copenhagen Documentary International Film Festival CPH:DOX. The film features performance of the band at the Afisha Picnic 2008 as well as night escapades on the Red Square.

The American band Calla shot a video for the song "Sanctify" from the last album Strength in Numbers (2007) during their performance at the Afisha Picnic 2006. The video was a collage of footage from international tours and studio sessions, the Picnic bits are those featuring live performance.
