= Kirill Sergeyev =

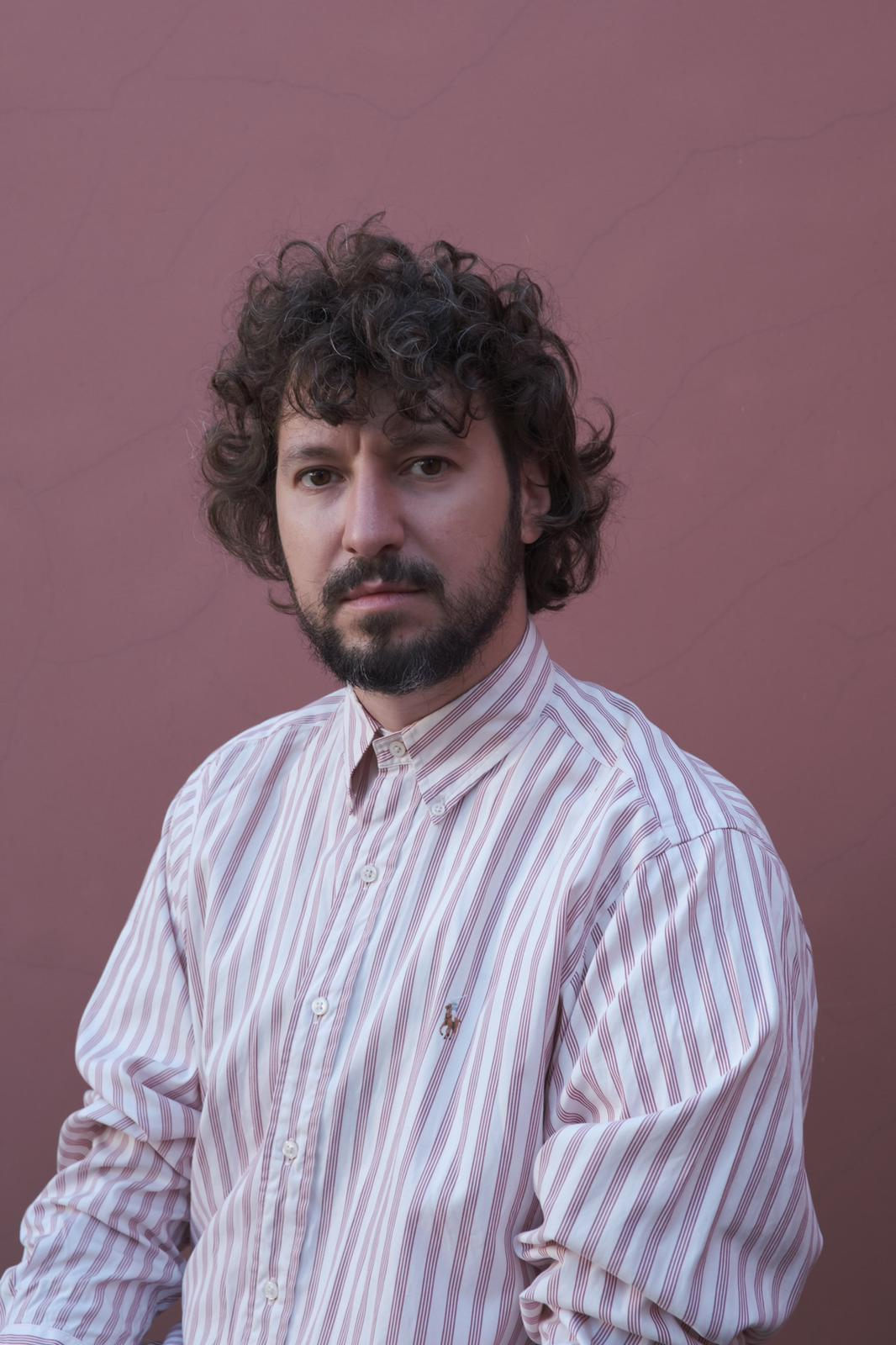

Background information
- Also known as: Kito Jempere
- Born: Kirill Yurievich Sergeyev; October 15, 1985 (age 41); Leningrad, Soviet Union
- Genre: electronic music
- Occupations: musician, song-writer, producer

Kirill Yurievich Sergeyev (best known as Kito Jempere; born October 15, 1985, Leningrad) is a Russian electronic musician, DJ, performer and producer. He is the member of the bands Uniquetunes, Saint Petersburg Disco Spin Club, Kito Jempere Band, Mancave and the leader of the solo musical project Toje Kito.

Sergeyev gained international fame under the pseudonym Kito Jempere in 2014. In Russia he became known after participating in an experimental concert of live electronic music on the new stage of the Alexandrinsky Theatre in 2015. Sergeyev performs solo as a DJ and as part of the bands with numerous concerts in Russia and abroad. As a DJ he prefers house, techno, trance, ambient music and other styles. A key feature of Sergeyev's work is the combination of electronic music with live orchestral performance.

== Biography ==
Kirill Yurievich Sergeyev was born on October 15, 1985, in Leningrad. He graduated from the Saint-Petersburg State University of Culture with a degree in Music Business Production. He also studied at the Variety and Jazz Department. Sergeyev spends most of his time in Saint Petersburg, where he composes and records his music. In addition, he produces bars, restaurants and major festivals. From 2013 to 2015, Sergeyev was the art director of Saint Petersburg bars Dom Beata and Beatnik. Since 2016, Sergeyev has been the art director of the Saint Petersburg restaurant Kuznya House located on New Holland Island. In 2021, he helped organize the Italian Holiday festival in Moscow, acting as a music curator.

Sergeyev is married, his wife's name is Anastasia. The couple has a son named Fedor.

== Career ==
=== Early life ===
Sergeyev began studying music at the age of six, learning to play the piano. From the age of ten, he wrote songs in Russian and English, and played guitar in school bands. Inspired by the work of Black Francis and the rock band Sonic Youth, in his teens Sergeyev founded his own band. As part of it he experimented with the creation of electronic music on the Intel 80486 computer.

=== DJ Kirill Sergeew and the Uniquetunes ===
In 2006, Sergeyev began performing as a DJ. Under the name DJ Kirill Sergeew, he played electronic music in Saint Petersburg nightclubs. At that time he also played the sampler as part of the Uniquetunes. Sergeyev was a permanent member of this band until 2012. Uniquetunes released three studio albums and one compilation of live performances, combining elements of nu jazz, trip-hop, indie rock and psychedelic music. The band also made a big European tour. The work of the Uniquetunes was praised by such musicians as Jaga Jazzist and Clutchy Hopkins. The group took part in such festivals as Open the Windows!, SKIF, Stereoleto Winter Session, BassTheWorld, Live! in the city and performed alongside leading Russian and foreign artists, including Red Snapper, Russian Circles, DJ Krush, Bonobo and Amon Tobin.

In 2009, the Uniquetunes received the Sergey Kuryokhin Award in the Electromechanics nomination as the best electronic music project. Together with the Uniquetunes Kirill Sergeyev composed music for Giuliano Di Capua's "Medea. Episodes". This play received the Grand Prix of the Sergey Kuryokhin Award in 2011.

=== Saint Petersburg Disco Spin Club ===
From 2010 to 2015, Sergeyev worked as a DJ under a new pseudonym – Saint Petersburg Disco Spin Club (SPDSC). The musician began to experiment in the genres of house and disco and in 2011 founded an improvisational band under the same name. The Saint Petersburg Disco Spin Club included Sergey Lipsky from the Simple Symmetry band, Grigory Dobrynin from On-The-Go, singer Yana Blinder, DJ Leonid Lipelis and others. Sergeyev continued to perform solo as a DJ and in 2013 released the album Contemporary Sound of Russia in collaboration with some members of the Saint Petersburg Disco Spin Club and other musicians. The album was released on the Glenview music label. Sergeyev became the A&R manager of this label in 2013.

In May 2013, Saint Petersburg Disco Spin Club took part in the Bosco Fresh festival held in Gorky Park as part of the Cherry Forest Open Art Festival. Saint Petersburg Disco Spin Club performed with Therr Maitz, Woodkid, Datarock, Motorama and other artists. In 2015, the band held an improvisational concert in one of the recording studios in St. Petersburg. At the same time in this studio the band recorded its live album.

=== Kito Jempere ===
In 2013, Kirill Sergeyev for the first time used the name Kito Jempere to record a track at Freerange Records, a record company owned by British DJ and producer Jamie Odell. Sergeyev said that while choosing this pseudonym he was inspired by the Japanese and Finnish languages. In 2014, Kito Jempere created his own record label Fata Morgana, where Sergeyev released his deep house solo album Objects. The musician described this album's style as "non-dance electronic music".

In 2015, Sergeyev made his debut with an improvisational concert of live electronic music. He performed on the new stage of the Alexandrinsky Theatre as part of the Open Rehearsal project. The musician's team experimented with using various objects as musical instruments, including a typewriter. Sergeyev performed with DJ Leonid Lipelis, SBPC leader Kirill Ivanov, IOWA drummer Ruslan Gadzhimuradov, multi-instrumentalist Anton Malinen, vocalist Artemy Gubnin, Sound Engineer Roman Urazov, as well as musicians Georgy Kotunov, Leon Sukhodolsky, Matvey Averin and Igor Shilov. Later Kirill Sergeyev invited Urazov, Gadzhimuradov, Averin and Lipelis to join the main part of the newly created Kito Jempere Band.

In 2016, the band was one of the headliners of the Present Perfect Festival in Saint Petersburg. In 2017, Kito Jempere Band recorded its first album Sea Monster. Ivanov, Kotunov, Sukhodolsky, Shilov and Malinen participated in the creation of this album as session musicians. The predominantly house compositions of the album combined elements of pop ballads and psychedelic music. Sea Monster, described by critics as a "Petersburg balearic", received positive reviews and worldwide interest. It was released in CD format in Japan, was aired on international radio stations BBC Radio 6 Music, NTS Radio London and was playing on DJ Tim Sweeney’s radio show in the US.

In July 2017, Kito Jempere Band took part in the Alfa Future electronic music festival in the Nizhny Novgorod region. In the same month, the band performed in Kolomenskoye Park in Moscow on the stage of the Afisha Picnic festival. Bands such as Kasabian, Foals, the Mushrooms, 5'nizza, A$AP Ferg, Husky also performed there. A year later, Kirill Sergeyev organized a concert on the main stage of New Holland Island in Saint Petersburg. Electronic musicians from Kito Jempere Band, Mujuice, Jimi Tenor and other performers took part in the concert as invited guests. The key feature of this concert was a symphony orchestra that performed arrangements of Sergeyev's electronic music.

In 2019, Kito Jempere Band took part in several major Russian festivals, including Stereoleto and Alfa Future People. At the Stereoleto festival, held by Tinkoff Bank in the Sevkabel Port art space, the musicians played together with Monetochka, Mumiy Troll and other artists.

In 2020, Kirill Sergeyev recorded another solo album under the name Kito Jempere – Yet Another Kito Jempere Album. This work was the result of Sergeyev's collaboration with a number of Russian and foreign electronic musicians, including Jimi Tenor, Richard Ter – the Red Snapper drummer, Mujuice, Miriam Sekhon, the New Composers and some members of Kito Jempere Band. The eclectic album, which combines compositions in the style of rap, trip-hop, minimal techno, jazz and French chanson, was praised by the critics. For Cosmonautics Day 2020, the New Composers and Kito Jempere released a premiere video for one of the songs from the new album. The live premiere of this album was postponed several times due to the global coronavirus pandemic. As of December 2021, the premiere is scheduled to take place at the Present Perfect festival in the summer of 2022.

Since the summer of 2020, the musician has been involved in the work of the Mancave band, which includes DJ Leonid Lipelis, guitarist Daniil Brod (also known for his participation in the Pompeya band), drummer Ruslan Gadzhimuradov and Grigory Nelyubin. The band presented their first album Berloga in August 2021 as part of the Jameson Yard x Strelka Bar pop-up project in Moscow.

In October 2021, Sergeyev released the mini-album Middle-Aged Hipster Crisis. In this work the musician for the first time used his own voice to record musical compositions.

In 2023, Kito Jempere announced his fourth studio album – Green Monster. The album resulted from Sergeyev’s cooperation with a range of musicians and sound engineers, including Tenor, Red Snapper drummer Rich Thair, Azari & III ex-vocalist Starving Yet Full, Lipelis, Curly Castro, SINDYSMAN, Urazov, Martin Iveson, and others. Green Monster was released on Dolby Atmos, stereo, vinyl, and cassette with accompanying visuals created in Midjourney. Combining hip-hop, jazz, and soundscapes, the collection received positive reviews and became the best album of the week according to Juno Daily. In April and June 2023, Kito Jempere released two music videos, Light Accent (for the album’s tracks Strong Accent and Light) and The Language of Love.

In April 2023, Kito Jempere, in collaboration with Alexandre Garese, made an announcement regarding the establishment of a music and art foundation.The foundation is intended to serve as a facilitator, fostering connections among artists. The foundation's mission is poised to have a far-reaching impact on the artistic community, promoting innovation and artistic expression worldwide.

=== Toje Kito ===
In November 2021, Kirill Sergeyev recorded his debut single under the new pseudonym Toje Kito. This track was recorded in Russian together with On-The-Go vocalist Yuri Makarychev.

== Discography ==
=== «Uniquetunes» ===
The following albums were released under Uniquetunes band brand:

=== Saint Petersburg Disco Spin Club ===
Several mini-albums, singles and recordings were realised under the Saint Petersburg Disco Club name:

Name	Details
I Need It (feat Lipelis)	Release date: May 7, 2012; Music Label: Teardrop; Format: digital distribution, phonograph record
Divine	Release date: June 2012; Music Label: What’s In The Box Records; Format: digital distribution, phonograph record
Love Spin	Release date: July 9, 2012; Music Label: Whiskey Disco; Format: phonograph record
I Never Leave You	Release date: July 10, 2012; Music Label: Conservation Department; Format: phonograph record
Contemporary Sound Of Russia, Vol. 1	Release date: 2013; Music Label: Glenview Records Inc.; Format: phonograph record, CD
Can't You See Me / Tender Melody	Release date: March 28, 2013; Music Label: Glenview Records Inc; Format: phonograph record
Nightdriving (feat The Legendary 1979 Orchestra)	Release date: April 30, 2013; Music Label: Legendary Sound Research; Format: phonograph record
Galernaya Live Sessions, Vol.1	Release date: May 29, 2013; Music Label: Is It Balearic? Recordings; Format: phonograph record
Live Sessions, Vol.2	Release date: November 4, 2019; Music Label: Emotional Response; Format: phonograph record

=== Kito Jempere ===
33 singles, including four full-length albums have been released under the name of Kito Jempere:

==== Albums ====
Name	Details
Objects	Release date: April 28, 2014; Music Label: Fata Morgana; Format: digital distribution, phonograph record
Sea Monster	Release date: April 2017; Music Label: Hell Yeah Recordings; Format: digital distribution, phonograph record, CD
Yet Another Kito Jempere Album	Release date: November 27, 2020; Music Label: Kito Jempere Records; Format: digital distribution
Green Monster	Release date: June 23, 2023; Music Label: Kito Jempere Records; Format: digital distribution, vinyl, cassette
Part Time Chaos Part Time Calmness	Release date: October 15, 2024; Music Label: Kito Jempere Records

==== Mini-albums (EP) and singles ====
- 2013 — «Confusion» (EP)
- 2015 — «Objects Remixes» (EP)
- 2015 — «Akio» (EP)
- 2015 — «Amended Wonders» (EP)
- 2016 — «Bah029»
- 2016 — «Loose Fits» (EP)
- 2016 — «I’m Saved»
- 2017 — «Super Sax Sounds» (EP)
- 2018 — «Damp Firecrackers» (EP)
- 2019 — «Uohha! / To Marvin»
- 2019 — «DB7 003»
- 2020 — «Your Ghost in Me» (EP)
- 2020 — «Time Traveler»
- 2021 — «思考気雲»
- 2021 — «Et Que Je Dorme»
- 2021 — «Sergio Leone»
- 2021 — «After The Storm»
- 2023 — «Language Of Love» with Adam Evald & Антоха МС
- 2023 — «Strong Accent» with Curly Castro, SINDYSMAN, Lovvlovver

=== Remix ===
From 2013 to 2021, Sergeyev, under the brand name Kito Jempere, released remixes of compositions by Russian and foreign artists, including Red Snapper (Blue Chest, 2015; B Planet, 2021), Mumiy Troll (Jimolost, 2019), Haddaway and Wolfram (12) ("My Love Is For Real", 2019).
