= Samoe Bolshoe Prostoe Chislo =

Russian indie music group

Samoe Bolshoe Prostoe Chislo Самое Большое Простое Число
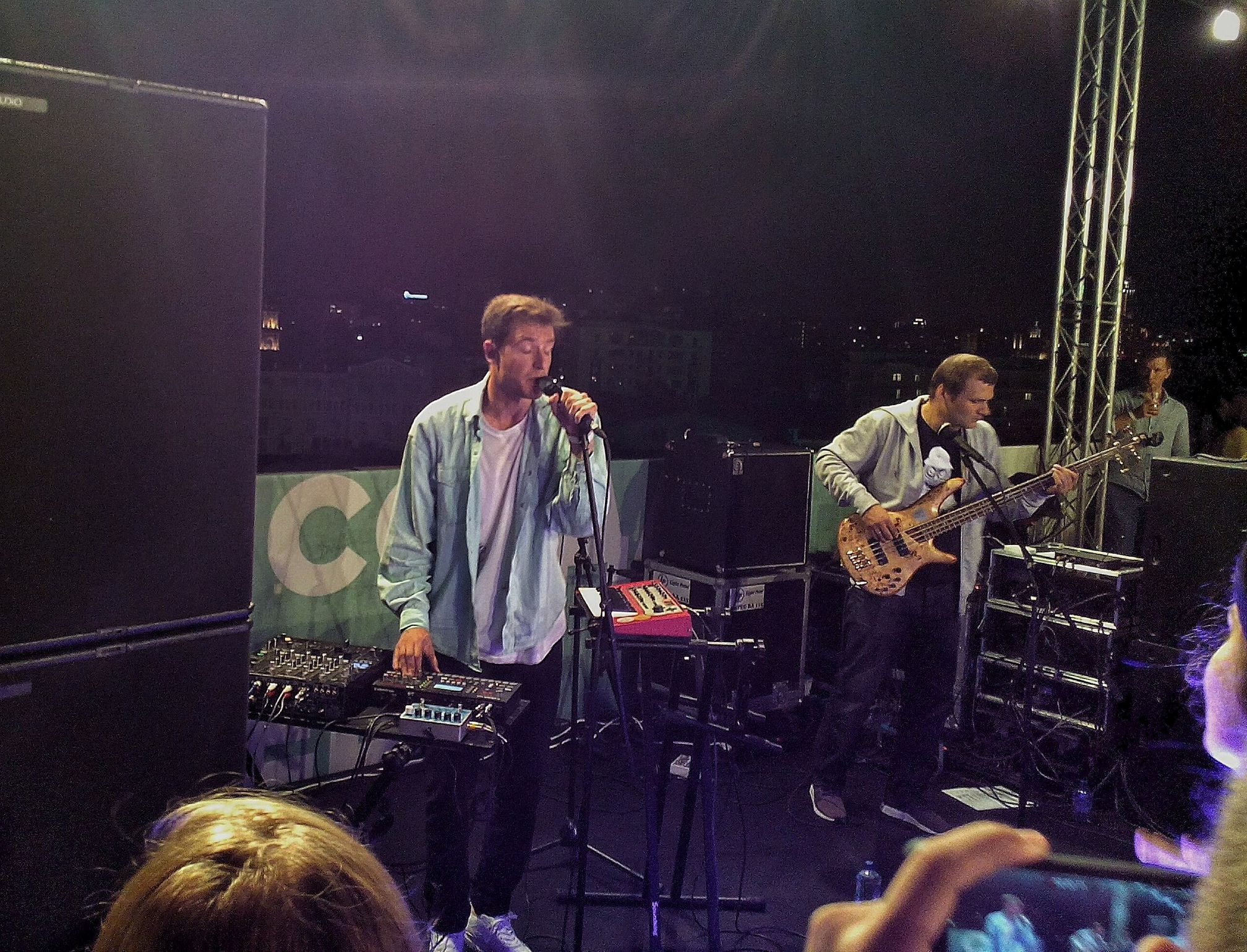
- Samoe Bolshoe Prostoe Chislo performing in 2016

Background information
- Also known as: СБПЧ
- Origin: Saint-Petersburg, Russia
- Genres: IDM; Ambient music; Indie rock; Electronica; Alternative hip hop
- Years active: 2006-present
- Members: Kirill Ivanov; Evgeniya Borzykh; Stanislav Astakhov
- Past members: Aleksandra Zakharenko; Aleksandr Zaitsev; Ilya Baramiya; Anton Khabibullin; Oleg Zanin

Samoe Bolshoe Prostoe Chislo (Russian: Самое Большое Простое Число, lit. 'The Largest Prime Number') is a Russian indie group formed in 2006 by Kirill Ivanov and the duo EU.

== History ==
In 2006, the journalist Kirill Ivanov met with the duo EU and showed them his musical material (at the time labeled as post-hip-hop, anti-hip-hop, deconstructivist hip-hop), which he had worked on in his free time. Ivanov first performed his material as part of 2H Company, a side-project of EU. The first performance in Moscow took place at the Avant Festival in 2006. In August, Ivanov performed at Nashestvie, after which the decision was made to record the new project's debut album.

Initially, the group was known as 2^{32,582,657} – 1, a representation of the largest known prime number at the time.

In 2007, the first album was finished and distributed through friends. The recording reached the famous musician and producer Oleg Nesterov, who officially released it on his label, Snegiri (Russian: Снегири, lit. 'Bullfinches').

A few years into the formation Samoe Bolshoe Prostoe Chislo, Kirill Ivanov continued to work as a journalist and did stories for the programs Glavnyi Geroi (Russian: «Главный герой», lit. 'Protagonist') on NTV and Bolshoi Gorod (Russian: «Большой город», lit. 'Big City') on STS. For a story on the Grushinsky festival for the latter program, Ivanov wrote a song that was performed at the festival by TV presenter Tatyana Arno with support from Aleksandr Zaitsev.

In 2008, the band members carried out the project SBPC-Orchestra (Russian: «СБПЧ-Оркестр») along with some musician friends. An album of the same name was recorded, with the participation of 17 different musicians, from Stas Baretsky to Larik Surapov (Russian: Ларик Сурапов), ObschezhitiE (Russian: ОбщежитиЕ), and Klever.

In the spring of 2009, the group returned to its status as a trio. SPBC moved away from its original genre, IDM: Ilya Baramiya took up the bass guitar, while Aleksandr Zaitsev became the guitarist and secondary vocalist, on equal footing with Ivanov. Some of the new material was performed at concerts and released as singles, but the group's third album was not released until November 12, 2011.

In 2012, the group released the album Lesnoi Orakul (Russian: «Лесной оракул», lit. 'Forest Oracle'), which was inspired by summertime sensations, especially stays at the children's camp "Kamchatka", where Kirill Ivanov had worked as a counselor from time to time. They also filmed a music video for the song "Idealnoe Mesto" (Russian: «Идеальное место», lit. 'Perfect Place'), the lead single from the album. The drummer Aleksandra Zakharchenko participated in the recording of the album.

The split album SPBC and Cassiopeia Sing Each Other's Songs (Russian: «СБПЧ и Кассиопея поют песни друг друга») was released in 2013 in a limited edition on red vinyl. It is the last recording to feature Alexander Zaitsev. After this, the group consisted for some time of Kirill Ivanov and Ilya Baramiya, who occasionally brought outside singers and musicians into their creative process.

On March 3, 2014, the album Ya dumayu, dlya etovo ne pridumali slovo (Russian: «Я думаю, для этого не придумали слово», lit. 'I think the word for this has not been invented') was released. On May 19, 2015, the album Zdes' i vsegda (Russian: «Здесь и всегда», lit. 'Here and always') was released.

In September 2016, the group released the album My - ogromnoe zhivotnoe, i my vas vsekh s'edim! (Russian: «Мы — огромное животное, и мы вас всех съедим!», lit. 'We are a huge animal, and we will eat you all!'), which was rated 7.5/10 by Afisha. A large-scale concert performance of the album took place in November in the Moscow venue Izvestiya Hall.

In 2017, "Vybroshu golovu - pust' dumaet serdtse!" (Russian: «Выброшу голову — пусть думает сердце!», lit. 'Dump your brain - let your heart think!') was released on the Internet, and the group appeared in the Russian film About Love. For Adults Only, performing the song "Tam" (Russian: «Там», lit. 'There').

In the spring of 2018, the group released the album My ne spali, my snilis' (Russian: «Мы не спали, мы снились», lit. 'We did not sleep, we dreamed'), in which singer and actress Zhenya Borzykh appeared as a full-fledged member of the group. In addition, the album featured Nadia Gritskevich, Thomas Mraz, and the Children's Television and Radio Choir of St. Petersburg. The album was produced by Aleksandr Lipsky, former keyboard player of the band Pompeya.

== Awards and nominations ==
- September 2008 — "GQ: Man of the Year" award — Winner in the category "Musician of the Year"
- December 2008 — Afisha magazine — Awarded best Russian-language album of the year («СБПЧ оркестр»)
- December 2011 — Time Out magazine includes the group's song "Zhivi khorosho!" (Russian: «Живи хорошо!», lit. 'Live well!') in its list of "100 songs that changed our lives"
- June 2014 — "Afisha-Wave": Best album of the first half of the year — Third place in reader poll (14,000 votes)
- June 2014 — Steppenwolf award — Winner in the category "Album of the Year" («Я думаю, для этого еще не придумали слово»)
- August 2014 — "Snob. Made in Russia" award — Nomination "Music"
- September 2014 — "GQ: Man of the Year" award — Nomination in "Musician of the Year"
- November 2014 — Jagermeister Indie Awards 2014 — Winner in categories "Group of the Year" and "Single of the Year"

== Discography ==
=== Studio albums ===
- Самое большое простое число (2007)
- СБПЧ Оркестр (2008)
- Флешка (2011)
- Лесной оракул (2012)
- СБПЧ и Кассиопея поют песни друг друга (2013)
- Я думаю, для этого не придумали слово (2014)
- Здесь и всегда (2015)
- Мы — огромное животное, и мы вас всех съедим! (2016)
- Выброшу голову — пусть думает сердце! (2017) [EP]
- Мы не спали, мы снились (2018)
- Наверное, точно (2019)
- Всё равно (2020)
- Со слов дерева записано верно (2021) [EP]
- Потерянное зеркальце (2021)
- Песни и музыка из сказки "Потерянное зеркальце" (2021)
- Ничего больше нет (2022)
- Животные пьют из луж (2024)

=== Singles ===
- Живи хорошо! (2010)
- Уменьшить себя, взявшись за угол (2011)
- СБПЧ 002 (2011)
- СБПЧ 003 (2011)
- Revoltmeter vs. СБПЧ (Самое большое простое число) & EU (Ёлочные игрушки) — Братское Сердце / White Heat (2011)
- Выходной (2014)
- Суперкит (2015)
- Люба (2016)
- Д-д-динозавр (2017)
- Море (Privet Vesna Remix By The Lcd Drmrs) (2018)
- Злой (2019)
- Кому (2019)
- Между строк (2022)
- Береги (2022)
- Зуб (2022)
- Значит (2023)

=== Remix collections ===
- Because You Don’t Know Russian (2014)

=== Music videos ===
- Рождество (2008)
- Это (2009)
- Живи хорошо! (2009)
- Блокада (2010)
- Втроём (2013)
- Секрет (2013)
- Идеальное место (2013)
- Свадьба (2013)
- Выходной (2014)
- Нельзя сказать короче (2014)
- Взвешен (2014)
- Стамбул (2015)
- Сёстры (2015)
- Ответ (2015)
- Море (2015)
- Суперкит (2016)
- 3 миллиарда ватт (2016)
- Люба (2016)
- Метеоры, кометы, болиды (2016)
- Sobaka (2017)
- Тайна (2017)
- Динозавр (2017)
- У нас есть всё (2018)
- Африка (2018)
- 1999 / 17:05 / Друг (2018) (мини-фильм)
- Комната (2019)
- Такси (2019)
- Злой (2019) (первый клип группы, набравший 1000000 просмотров на YouTube)
- Молодость (2019)
- Часы (2019) (второй клип группы, набравший 1000000 просмотров на YouTube)
- Нежно (2020)
- Король (2020)
- Прах (2020)
- Потерянное зеркальце (трейлер) (2021)
- Всё равно (2021)
- Береги (2022)
- Инопланетяне (2022)
