= Motorama =

Motorama may refer to:

- General Motors Motorama, an auto show from 1949 to 1961
- Motorama (film), a 1991 film
- Motorama (band), a Russian post-punk band
