= Therr Maitz =

Russian indie band

- Origin: Moscow, Russia
- Genres: Indie; pop; funk; disco
- Years active: 2004–present
- Website: http://therrmaitz.com

Therr Maitz (ter 'meɪts) is a Russian indie band, which brings together a mix of trip-hop, acid jazz, breakbeat, house, disco, funk and pop. It was founded by musician, producer, and composer Anton Belyaev in 2004.

Since 2011, Therr Maitz has been active in concert and touring, participating in major music festivals, releasing music, and participating in film and television projects.

The group was recognized with the award for Most Popular Russian Music Band at the "Event of the Year" ceremony in 2014. The band was also the best selling act on iTunes Russia and Apple Music Russia in 2015, and received the award for Best Russian Artist at the 2016 MTV Europe Music Awards.

== Current members ==
- Anton Belyaev (lead vocals, keyboards)
- Victoria Zhuk (vocals, songwriter)
- Ignat Kravtsov (drums)
- Dmitry Fomin (bass guitar)
- Dmitry Pavlov (guitar)
- Jorge Luis Nunez Palacio (percussionist)
- Ilya Kamaldinov (guitar)

== History ==
=== 1995–2006 ===
In 1995, while studying at Academic School of Music, Anton Belyaev hosted jam sessions on the interdenominational Christian radio station "New Life" in Magadan. During this time, Anton composed the track «The Flow».

In 1998 Anton Belyaev entered the Khabarovsk State Institute of Arts and Culture in the Pop and Jazz Art Department. During his studies Anton worked at various clubs of Khabarovsk as a musician and an art director. In 2004, as he became the art director of "Russia" club, where Anton Belyayev invited musicians: Dmitry Pavlov (guitar), Maxim Bondarenko (bass), Konstantin Drobitko (trumpet), Eugene Kozhin (drums) to play. The availability of technical resources in the club allowed Anton Belyaev to start creating music that would become the base for future Therr Maitz tracks. Anton created the tracks "The Flow" and "Paris Line" using the samples recorded in Magadan before 1998. Inspired by his purchase of a Rhodes Piano Mark II, Anton Belyaev recorded a song named "The Ocean", with the lead melody performed by Konstantin Drobitko (trumpet).

In 2005, Anton Belyaev signed a contract with a Japanese company for a series of club performances in Tokyo and Kyoto and moved with the musicians to work in Japan. In December 2005, promoter Sinisa Lazarevic opened the "Out Hall" club in Vladivostok and invited Therr Maitz to play at the opening. Afterwards, Dmitry Pavlov and Maksim Bondarenko moved to Moscow. Constantine Drobitko left the band, due to a work contract in Korea. Eugene Kozhin decided to stay in Khabarovsk. Anton Belyaev worked in Vladivostok (at the BSB and Out Hall clubs), and in 2006 he moved to Moscow.

=== 2006–2010 ===
From 2006 to 2010 Anton Belyaev worked as a musical producer with Tamara Gverdtsiteli, Igor Grigoriev, Maxim Pokrovsky and Polina Gagarina. Projects with Therr Maitz was placed on hold.

=== 2011—present ===
In May 2010 Therr Maitz released their first album, Sweet Oldies, which is a compilation of the tracks written during the early period of the band. As the album sold well, Anton Belyaev decided to reunite Therr Maitz.

In the fall of 2010 Anton Belyaev met Oleg Ingiozov (percussion, the TANTSUI project) and invited him to join the band. On 22 October 2010 in club Squat they had a gig. Afterwards, Dmitry Pavlov (Megapolis, Poles) and Maxim Bondarenko left the group, and Anton Belyaev started looking for new musicians. During the session recordings for Igor Grigoriev's track "Tango", Anton Belyaev met Nikolay Sarabyanov (guitar) (MAD DOG, Basta, Irina Bogushevskaya, Grishkovets and Bigudi, Tokyo, Machete, Batyrkhan Shukenov) and invited him to work with Therr Maitz. During recording sessions for Polina Gagarina, Anton Belyaev met with Artem Tildikov (bass with Zemfira, Noggano), who also joined Therr Maitz. Boris Ionov (drums Zventa Sventana, Guru Groove Foundation, Basta, Vladimir Presnyakov, Polina Gagarina) replaced Oleg Ingiozov in the spring 2011. The first concert with the new line-up was held on Friday, May 13, 2011, in Cargo Bar on Red October. Ilya Lukashev (Zemfira, Elka, Grishkovets and Bigudi, Zventa Sventana) was invited act as the sound-engineer for the concert. Victoria Zhuk (Los Devchatos) was invited to sing as well. As a result, the present band lineup was formed.

In 2011 Therr Maitz performed in one of the largest festivals in Russia Usad'ba Jazz, the annual Kazantip Republic international festival, the MIGZ international festival of music and media art. In 2012 in Tomsk the band participated in the Red Rocks festival supported by Sberbank Russia and which coincided with the Olympic Games in Sochi.

In May 2013 in Gorky Park Therr Maitz performed at The Bosco Fresh festival, which was a part of open-air festival Cherry Wood, alongside other indie-rock acts such as WOODKID, Datarock, Motorama. On June 12, 2013, the annual Maxidrom festival organized by Radio Maximum was held. 30 seconds to Mars was the headliner of the festival, and Therr Maitz was invited to play as a warm up act. Right after Maxidrom, Therr Maitz went on tour to the Russian Far East where they performed twice within the Red Rocks festival (in Khabarovsk and Vladivostok), and also performed in some additional club concerts. On July 27, 2013, Therr Maitz participated in the Gipsy parking electronic music festival, headlined by the American musician Nicolas Jaar.

The popularity of Therr Maitz sharply increased after the success of its frontman Anton Belyaev in the second season of the Russia's version of "The Voice" (2013). The debut single "Make It Last", released on February 13, 2014, was on top of the iTunes singles chart in Russia for a week. Later, the song appeared in the soundtrack to the «Some like it cold» movie. On February 20, 2014, Therr Maitz appeared on the Evening Urgent broadcast live from Sochi where the Winter Olympic Games taking place, and the single "Feeling Good Tonight" was played for the first time live on air. On May 12, Therr Maitz was featured for a third time on Evening Urgant and performed the song "Stop Quiet". On May 15, Therr Maitz gave a concert where they presented songs from their upcoming album. On the same day, the album became available for preorder on iTunes, and two versions of "Feeling Good Tonight" (the radio version and UNKLE remix) were released as instant gratification tracks for immediate download. The radio version was the leader of week, having topped the iTunes charts within a day after release. On a roll, the first single "Make It Last" also returned to the charts. On May 16 Therr Maitz became the first Russian band ever to have three songs at the top of the iTunes chart simultaneously.

Starting in June 2014 the band went on a Russian tour to promote their upcoming album. In a month, Therr Maitz visited over 10 cities and played the festival season in Russia by taking part in all the largest open-air festivals in the country: Usad'ba Jazz, Wild Mint, ParkLive, Stereoleto and The Afisha Picnic (with Jamiroquai as headliners). Having returned to Moscow, Therr Maitz started to work on a new acoustic program for a concert on December 4, 2014, in Crocus City Hall. On September 19, 2014, right after their concert in 16 tons in honor of for Anton Belyaev's birthday, the band launched a reward crowdfunding campaign on the planeta.ru website. During the next three months, fans had a chance to take part in the creation of a Therr Maitz documentary — Moviecorn – consisting of video of a concert by Therr Maitz in Ray Just Arena club on May 15, a documentary-style shooting of behind-the-scene band life, and other special bonuses. On December 22, 2014, the campaign was successfully completed. Funds raised went to the creation of the movie Moviecorn, and its release.

On December 4, 2014, the band performed a unique acoustic concert at Crocus City Hall accompanied by a string orchestra from London. The orchestra was conducted by Sally Herbert. New string arrangements of well-known Therr Maitz songs (Feeling Good Tonight, Make It Last, Stop Quiet, See you) and covers of worldwide hits were made for the acoustic concert. The concert also featured the premiere of the song "Robots".

Three months later, on March 4, 2015, Therr Maitz released their second studio album named UNICORN on iTunes. Tracks on the album were recorded at different studios in London, Moscow and Rio de Janeiro, and were mixed at the Therr Maitz private studio in Moscow. During the last two months of work on album, many tracks were almost completely re-recorded, including earlier singles such as "Make It Last", "Feeling Good Tonight" and "Stop Quiet". Right after its release, in a few hours, album was in first place on iTunes charts in Russia. The album contained fifteen songs, one remix, made by UNKLE, and a digital booklet. It was physically released on 1 June 2015. The album was also issued on vinyl.

In spring 2015 Anton Belyaev took part as a producer in the Russian version of The X Factor project called "Main Stage". The band performed their single “Make It Last” from the Unicorn album during one of the episodes.

On August 9, Therr Maitz performed “Make it Last” during the FINA World Championships 2015 Closing Ceremony.

The official music video for "Found U" video released on September 24, 2015, had over 1.5 million views on YouTube during its first week. The video for the song Harder (Live at Ray Just Arena) was released on the same date becoming the first official video from the upcoming documentary "Moviecorn".

On October 8, 2015, Therr Maitz played a new two-hour electronic program that included new tracks as well as their most popular singles. Their second concert at Crocus City Hall was accompanied by the State Symphony Orchestra Novaya Rossiya (artistic director – chief conductor Yury Bashmet) and followed by a light show.

In 2015, Therr Maitz went on a Russian tour of over 20 cities, including Nizhny Novgorod, Vladivostok, Sochi, Ekaterinburg, Novosibirsk, Krasnoyarsk, Kazan, Samara, Yaroslavl, with sold out acoustic and electronic concerts in Saint Petersburg, Irkutsk, Rostov-on-Don, Khabarovsk, Voronezh. Besides the Russian cities, Therr Maitz also played the major cities of Azerbaijan (Baku), Belorussia (Minsk), Moldova (Chișinău), Latvia (Riga), Abkhazian Sukhum and Erevan in Armenia, Bulgaria and Cyprus.

On October 15, 2015, Therr Maitz made their Great Britain debut in London's Under The Bridge Club.

Therr Maitz's official video to the song “Doctor” was released on December 24, 2015, guest starring Anton Belyaev's wife Julia. It took four and half years to complete the video. "Doctor" is filmed in black and white, with each color signifying either the male or female parts of the video. Anton Belyaev represents the male part of the video, shot in 2011. The female part features a bold "anti-ballet" improvisation by his wife, Julia Belyaeva, using her perennial Wushu, yoga and ballroom dancing experience in 2015. "Doctor" was the first track Anton started to work on after he had met his future wife.

In December 2015, iTunes Russia announced Therr Maitz as the "Best Artist"of the year.

On May 6, 2016 Therr Maitz released "365". The single reached the top of the alternative iTunes charts within one day of release, beating The Red Hot Chili Peppers, Radiohead and Coldplay. On the next day, the track reached the top of the Google Play charts, where it held for one week.

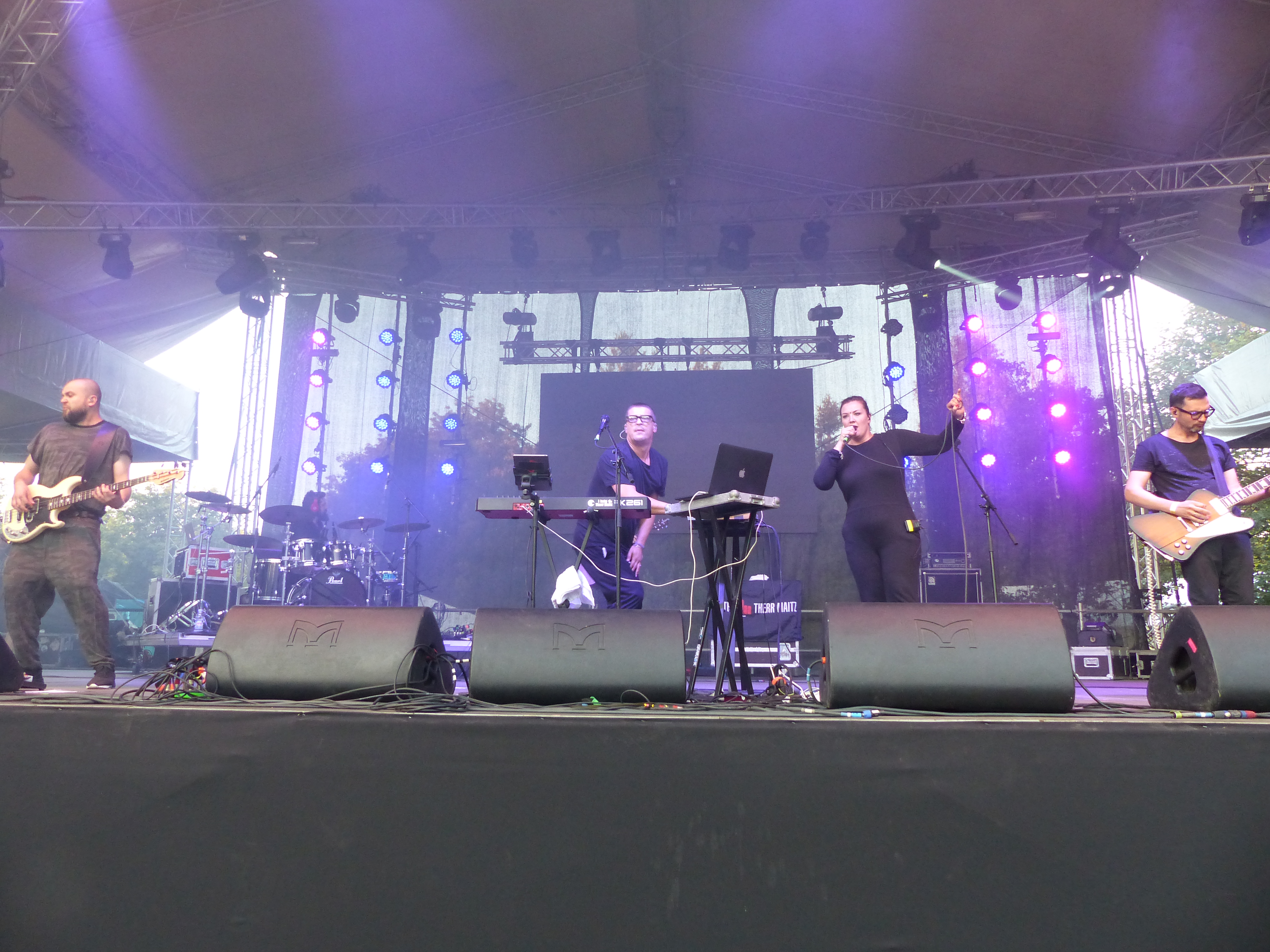
Therr Maitz at Sziget Festival 2016.

On August 5, 2016 Therr Maitz released an acoustic mini-album "Tokyo Roof". It includes 4 songs recorded on the roof of a Tokyo skyscraper. For more than a week the album held first place in the iTunes alternative music chart and almost for two weeks led the top alternative albums in Google Play

On August 13, Therr Maitz performed at Europe's biggest festival Sziget in Budapest.

On October 7, Therr Maitz released a single and music video for "My Love Is Like". On the day of its release, the video hit the top of video charts in Russian iTunes, where it stayed for 6 days. The song "My Love Is Like" also held first place on the alternative charts for a week. For the first 24 hours, the video for "My Love Is Like" scored more than 1 million views on YouTube in Russia. Over the next 4 days, this figure rose to 2 million, and after a few weeks the number of views exceeded the mark of 4 million. The main roles in the video were played by Victoria Zhuk (Therr Maitz vocalist) and Boris Ionov (Therr Maitz drummer). The choreography in the video was staged by the mentor of the show "Dances" on the Russian TNT channel – Miguel and the choreographer of his team Katya Reshetnikova; the roles were performed by the participants of the show "Dances". In addition to the video itself, Therr Maitz released a movie about the creation of the video from backstage in a 360-degree format.

In 2016, Therr Maitz actively collaborated with the TNT channel: the song "365" was included in the soundtrack of the series "Univer", and the songs "Harder", "Feeling Good Tonight" and "My Love Is Like" were performed in the show "Dances". The track "My Love Is Like" Therr Maitz was performed live: the final gala concert of the third season of the show "Dances" opened with the band's performance, accompanied by choreography from Miguel.

In addition, to the original choreography, a second dance was choreographed for the song "My Love Is Like" for the show "Comedy Woman".

In June 2016 Therr Maitz launched their own collection of glasses with Russian brand Harry Cooper. Each model in the product range has a name of one of Therr Maitz' songs. The glasses became very popular, and collaboration of the band with Harry Cooper is still active.

On January 7, 2017, Therr Maitz released a live video for "Robots" – a recording from a concert at Crocus City Hall, where the song was presented and performed, accompanied by a string orchestra from London.

On May 22, 2017, the single and the video to «Undercover» were released. The song was first performed during the concert in November 2016, and only in the middle of January Anton and Julia shared the news that they are expecting a baby boy. While working on the song Anton decided that music can also help other children – those, who are left behind. That's how the idea of charity aimed release was born. The project was organized together with Sony Music Entertainment and charity fund «Bureau of Good Deeds» - and all the funds raised from the track sale will be donated to the orphans.

On June 30, 2017, Therr Maitz performed at Atlas Weekend – the largest festival in Ukraine, held in Kyiv, and on August 5 the band took part in Granatos Live festival in Vilnius.

In October 2017 the drummer Boris Ionov and the bass guitarist Artem Tildikov left the band.

On February 14 Therr Maitz launched pre-orders for new album "Capture" with the song and the video "Container".

On February 14, 2018, the movie "Led" (Ice), in which Anton Belyaev was one of the composers, came out. On February 25, 2018, the track "Power" was released as an individual single. On March 8, 2018, in the Adrenaline-Stadium club Therr Maitz played a big solo concert, accompanied by an orchestra, with Dmitry Selipanov as a conductor. The large-scale light show for the concert was made by the studio Sila Sveta. On August 10, 2018, Therr Maitz celebrated their 7th anniversary since foundation of Moscow membership. Open-air festive concert took place at design-factory "Flacon". On September 14, 2018, Therr Maitz performed at Passionskirche in Berlin. During the performance they showcased new album "Capture". On September 27, 2018, Therr Maitz took part at 20-th anniversary of MTV. They performed with tracks My love is like and Power in collaboration with Polina Gagarina.

On November 17, 2018, Therr Maitz members took part as speakers at educational forum for musicians Waveforum. On December 7, 2018, Therr Maitz performed at Big concert hall "Oktyabrsky" (Saint-Petersburg). The concert was accompanied with orchestra led by Dmitry Selipanov.

In June 2019 Nikolay Sarabyanov (guitar) left the band. He was replaced by Dmitry Pavlov, who actually played in the very first Therr Maitz' membership.

On August 22 Therr Maitz performed at the opening ceremony of WorldSkills championship in Kazan with a new version of their track "Undercover". On April 16, 2021, Therr Maitz released the track and music video "Superstar" in one song, as well as a lyric video. On May 15, 2021, Therr Maitz performed at the opening ceremony of the XXIX All-Russian Student Art Festival "Russian Student Spring" at Nizhny Novgorod Stadium. On August 28, 2021, FC "Krasnodar" showed to the audience its new anthem, written by Hollywood composer Hans Zimmer. Arrangement of the anthem was done by Anton Belyaev.

On September 3, 2021, Therr Maitz played at Lenmosti festival, where Anton Belyaev also performed at an open-talk. On March 25, 2022, Therr Maitz released a music video for the track "Future Is Bright", and on December 9 the song was officially released on streaming platforms.

On February 5, 2023, it was announced that Anton Belyaev will be the mentor of the new season of the show "The Voice" on Channel One.

2023 Releases:

· June 13, 2023 — "Zemlya / Znaesh" (Land / You Know) (Therr Maitz & Yolka), (LAB with Anton Belyaev).

· July 11, 2023 — "Nichego ne govori / Fantazyor" (Don't Say Anything / Dreamer) (Azamat Musagaliev & Therr Maitz), (LAB with Anton Belyaev).

· August 22, 2023 — "Therr Maitz. LAB with Anton Belyaev", singles ("That Wave", "Help Us").

· December 12, 2023 — "Tvori dobro" (Create Good) (Therr Maitz & Zivert).

Major Concerts 2024:

· January 5, 2024 — Saint Petersburg, "Big Christmas Concert with Orchestra and Choir".

· May 31, 2024 — Moscow, VTB Arena: LAB show with Anton Belyaev featuring musicians of Therr Maitz, a choir, and an orchestra.

2024 Releases and Soundtracks:

· April 26, 2024 — "Prekrasnoye dalyoko" (Beautiful Far-Off) (Therr Maitz, HOR & OpensoundOrchestra) — soundtrack for the film "One Hundred Years Ahead".

Major Concerts and Festivals 2025:

· May 31, 2025 — Moscow, VTB Arena: LAB show with Anton Belyaev (featuring Therr Maitz musicians).

· August 7, 2025 — Moscow, Luzhniki Stadium, "MTS Live Leto" stage: Anton Belyaev's LAB show with a choir, orchestra, and guests.

· April 18, 2025 — Lineup announcement for the "Planeta K-30" festival (Therr Maitz among the participants).

2025 Releases:

· April 11, 2025 — "Vechno molodoy (LAB with Anton Belyaev)" (Forever Young) — Sergey Bobunets & Therr Maitz.

· April 25, 2025 — "Kaleidoskop" (Kaleidoscope) (LAB Live with Anton Belyaev).

· February 8, 2025 — "Mimokhodom" (In Passing) (Anastasia Sadkovskaya & Therr Maitz).

· July 22, 2025 — "Found U (Remix)" — Therr Maitz & James Lo Scott.

· March 28, 2025 — Zoloto & Anton Belyaev (Therr Maitz): new version of "Kabriolet" (Convertible).

== LAB with Anton Belyaev ==
At the end of 2019, the musicians took part in Anton Belyaev's LAB show. This is a project about contemporary music, the participants of which are musicians of Ther Maitz and a guest artist.

All three seasons of the project were exclusively released on streaming services and TV. The first season was released on Yandex.Air, the second on KinoPoisk, and the third season was part of the TNT network and later added to the Premier online cinema catalog. The musical numbers of the LAB show are published on Ther Maitz official YouTube channel.

Participants of the first season

- Jah Khalib
- Monetochka
- Polina Gagarina
- FEDUK
- Alexander Revva
- Levan Gorozia
- Valery Syutkin
- Oleg LSP
- Lyubov Uspenskaya
- Leonid Agutin

Season 2 contestants:

- Basta
- Zivert
- Ivan Urgant
- Noize MC
- Charlot
- Lolita
- Lev Leshchenko
- Elena Temnikova
- Gruppa Skryptonite

In the last episode the audience was in for a surprise. As a guest were Therr Maitz, in which Anton Belyaev is the frontman.

Season 3 participants

- Gruppa Skryptonite
- Leonid Agutin
- Slava Marlow
- Little Big
- Ilya Lagutenko
- Ivan Dorn
- LJ
- Lolita
- FEDUK
- Kirill Bledny
- Semyon Slepakov
- Marina Kravets

== Awards and achievements ==
In 2014 the band was recognized as the most popular Russian band according to the annual national award "Event of the Year".

In 2015 Therr Maitz became the best performer of the year on Russian iTunes and Apple Music.

On November 6, 2016, Therr Maitz were recognized as the best Russian artist according to the 2016 MTV Europe Music Awards.

On October 25, 2017, Therr Maitz received the 2017 Moda Topical Magazine Breakthrough of the Year Award for Band of the Year.

In 2021, Therr Maitz participated in the National Selection for Eurovision 2021 along with Manizha and duo 2Mashi. The band presented the song "Future Is Bright".

On February 5, 2023, it was announced that Anton Belyaev will be the mentor of the new season of the show "The Voice" on Channel One.

== Discography ==
Sweet oldies (2010)

- The Ocean
- Paris Line
- Sensitive Tune
- The Flow
- Web
- Get Together
- It Goez On
- Silver Spell
- Move
- Stupid
- Umge
- Without
- Heart

Make it Last — Single (2014)

- Make it Last

Feeling Good Tonight — Single (2014)

- Feeling Good Tonight (Radio Edit)
- Feeling Good Tonight (UNKLE Reconstruction)
- Feeling Good Tonight (Too Long Rip)
- Feeling Good Tonight (U Can Sing / Instrumental)

Unicorn (2015)

- Manta Walking Down the Street
- Found U
- Feeling Good Tonight (Radio Edit)
- Feel Free
- Seconds of Luv
- Stop Quiet
- Hard Lights
- Follow
- Doctor
- Make It Last
- Harder
- Earth
- Feeling Good Tonight
- Feeling Good Tonight (UNKLE Reconstruction)
- Feeling Good Tonight (Porno Cheap Rip)

365 – Single (2016)

- 365

Tokyo Roof – EP (2016)

- Silver
- 365 (Acoustic)
- Manta (Acoustic)
- Taken

My Love Is Like – EP (2016)

- My Love Is Like
- My Love Is Like (MrRenedekart Remix)
- My Love Is Like (Billy Rubin Remix)
- My Love Is Like (Rodion Kononov Remix)
- My Love Is Like (All Mode Remix)

TM: Remixes – EP (2017)

- My Love Is Like (Atlaxsys Remix)
- 365 (Atlaxsys Remix)

Undercover – Single (2017)

- Undercover

=== Power – Single (2017) ===
- Power

=== Container – Single (2018) ===
- Container

=== Superstar – Single (2021) ===
- Superstar

=== Future Is Bright – Single (2022) ===
- Future Is Bright
