= Julia Mayorova =

Russian-Ukrainian photographer and director

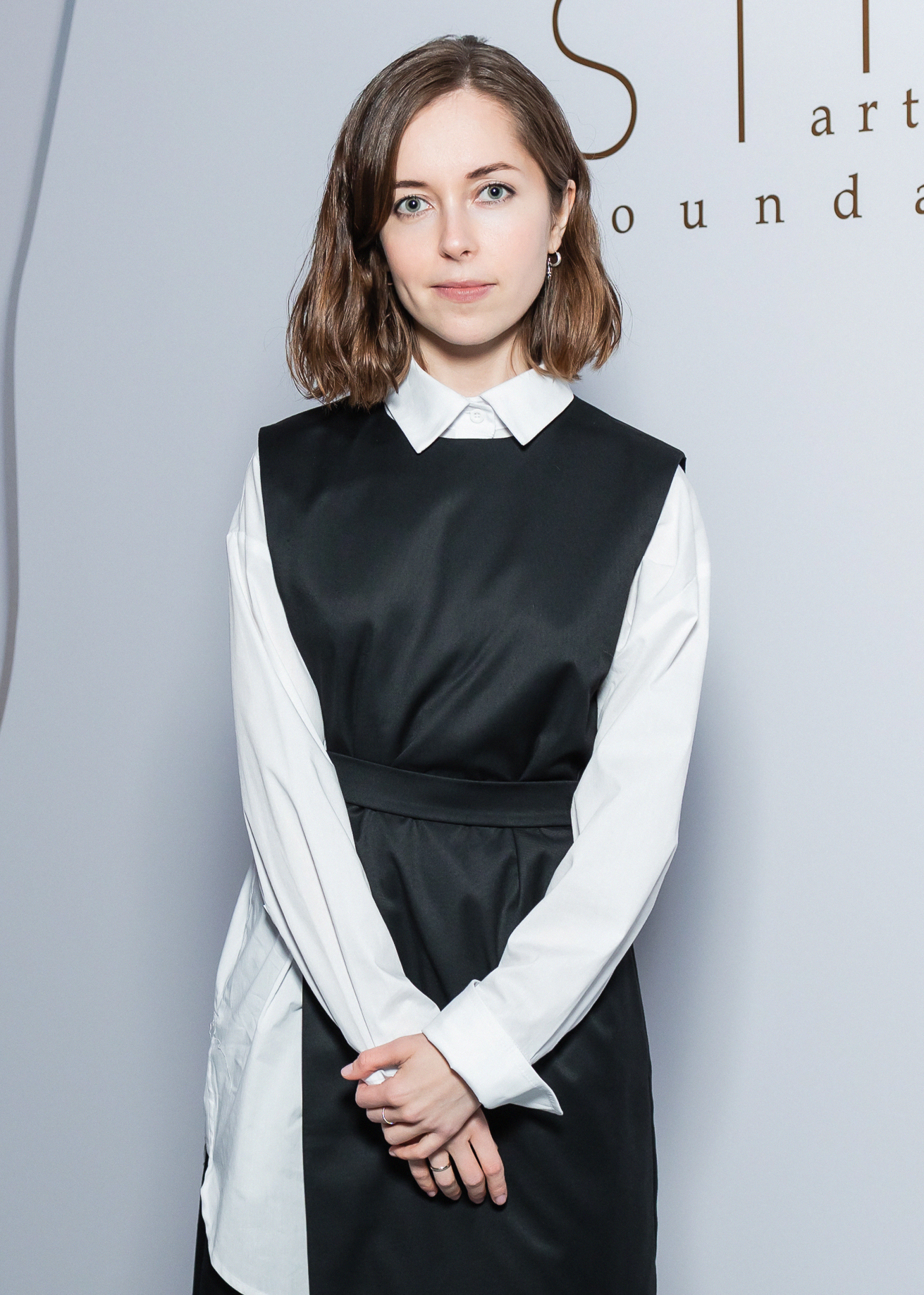
- Born: Yulia Alexandrovna Mayorova; July 26, 1992 (age 32); Makiivka, Ukraine
- Education: Moscow State University
- Known for: Photography

Julia Mayorova (born July 26, 1992) is a Russian-Ukrainian photographer and director. She specializes in portrait photography.

Mayorova collaborated with Louis Vuitton, Apple, Estée Lauder, Chanel, Omega and other brands. She also worked with Jennifer Lopez, Nicole Kidman, Cindy Crawford, Shia LaBeouf, Karlie Kloss, Abel Ferrara, George Clooney, John Galliano, as well as with Russian celebrities, including Monetochka, Mujuice, Ivan Urgant and Elena Temnikova.

== Biography ==
Mayorova was born on July 26, 1992, in Makiivka, Ukraine. In 2002, she moved to Moscow, Russia with her family. Mayorova graduated from Moscow State University (MSU) with a degree in journalism.

She has been living in Los Angeles, United States since 2016.

== Career ==
Mayorova began practicing photography during her student years. She studied at The MSU Department of Advertising and Public Relations and attended classes at the Department of Photography. Besides that, Mayorova independently studied the theory of photography. In 2009, she began working as a society photographer, collaborating with Interview magazine.

In 2016–2017, she shot events that took place at the Garage Museum of Contemporary Art.

In March 2021, Mayorova collaborated with Apple for its "Women’s History month" campaign. For this project Apple invited female photographers to shoot on iPhone 12 for International Women's Day. The idea was to show how gender influences photography.

Mayorova's project mainly consisted of still life photos in a color scheme of gender-based colors – pink and blue.

In April 2021, the Multimedia Art Museum hosted the exhibition "Julia Mayorova. Silent Mode". Olga Sviblova became the curator of this event, which was part of the XII International Photobienniale "Fashion and Style in Photography — 2021".

“Silent Mode" was a collection of selected works by Julia Mayorova, which included portraits of Nicole Kidman, Mujuice, Monetochka, Takashi Murakami, Jennifer Lopez, Cindy Crawford, Karlie Kloss and others. The exhibition focused on the characters and revealed a moment of inner silence.

=== Publications ===
Mayorova's works have been published in such magazines as Vogue, Interview, Elle, Glamour, GQ, Esquire, Dazed, Marie Claire, Cosmopolitan and others.

=== Photo projects ===
Mayorova photographed people for advertising campaigns, magazines, album covers and other commercial projects, including:

- Omega advertising campaign featuring actresses Nicole Kidman, Cindy Crawford and model Alessandra Ambrosio;
- Louis Vuitton Fall-Winter'21 and 'LV Squad' ad campaign featuring Internet celebrities Emma Chamberlain and Charli D'Amelio;
- portraits of Abel Ferrara, American filmmaker;
- portraits of actor Shia LaBeouf, which were later published in GQ Russia;
- shooting model Maye Musk for Vogue Hong Kong;
- covers of the Mujuice album "Regress", his single "Time" and video clips "Sad Eyes" and "Time";
- shooting the singer Monetochka for Glamour and other magazines;
- cover for the "Dreamers" album by Pompeya.

=== Directing ===
In 2017, Mayorova directed the Mujuice music videos "Time" and "Sad Eyes". In April 2019, Mayorova directed and took part in the project of Dmitry Volkov and Pavel Pepperstein called "Freedom of Will. Illusion or Possibility". It was held in the Russian State Library as part of the annual "Library Night".

In 2021, Mayorova directed two advertising campaigns for Louis Vuitton.
