= Aigel (band) =

Russian electronic hip-hop duo

Aigel Аигел
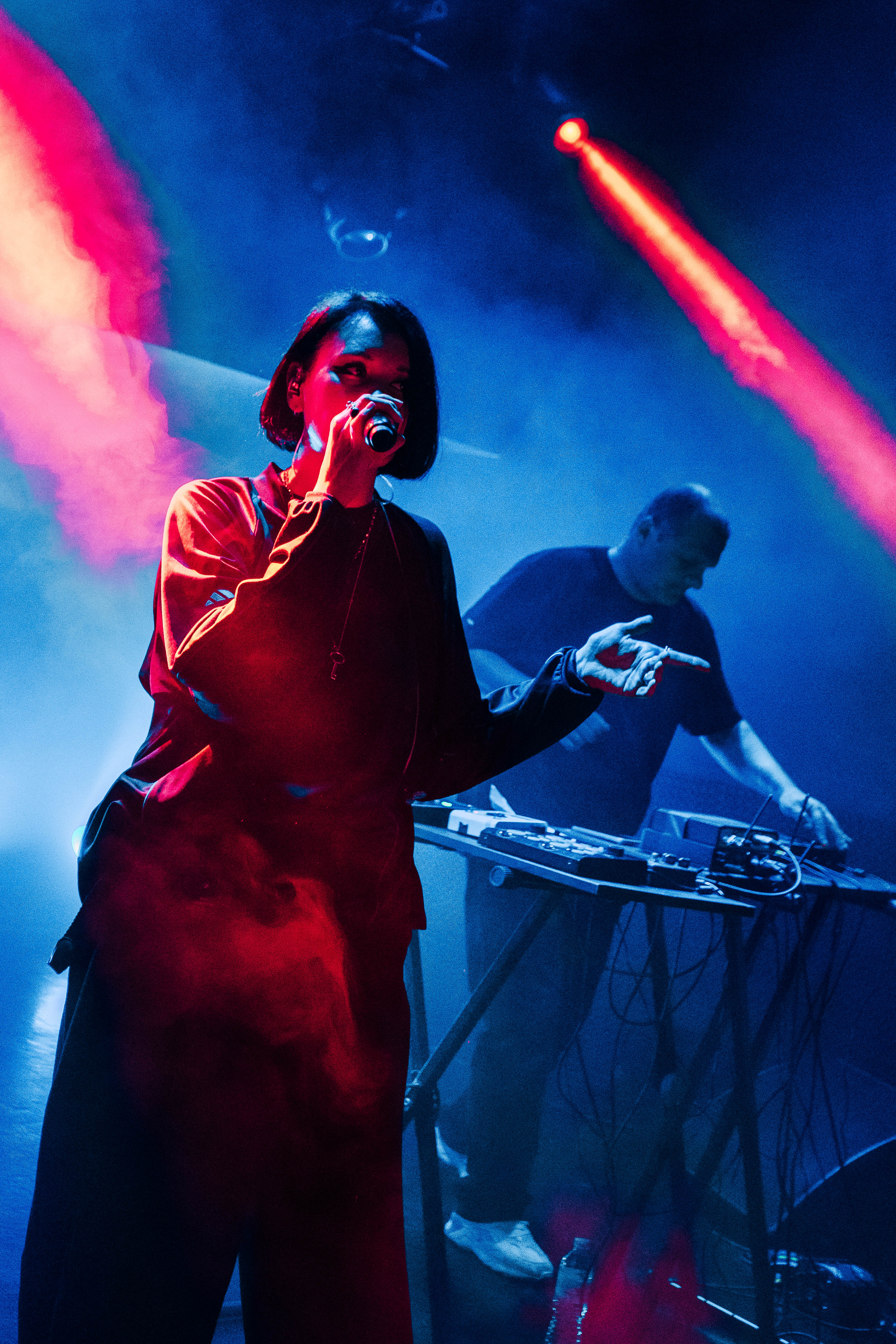
- Aigel performing live in May 2025

Background information
- Origin: Russia
- Genres: Hip hop; electronic; pop; techno-pop; house; trap; alternative
- Years active: 2016–present
- Label: A+ (2025)
- Members: Aigel Gaisina; Ilya Baramiya
- Website: https://aigel.band/

Aigel (stylised in all caps; Tatar: Аигел) is a Tatar-Russian electronic hip-hop duo, consisting of Aigel Gaisina, a poet from Naberezhnye Chelny, and Ilya Baramiya, an electronic musician from Saint Petersburg. Due to the Russian attack on Ukraine they have left their home country and are currently based in Berlin, Germany and Montenegro.

== Members ==
=== Aigel Gaisina ===
Gaisina was born on 9 October 1986 and lives in Naberezhnye Chelny. In 2023, she had to flee to Berlin (Germany), because she had protested against the Russian invasion of Ukraine. She is a professional voice actor.

Gaisina started writing songs in school and first performed on stage when she was 16. She released her debut album, Les (Russian: «Лес»), in 2003. In the mid-2000s, she gained recognition as a poet and translator of Tatar poetry in literary magazines. In 2013, Gaisina and Temur Khadyrov formed the experimental electronic group Tak Krasivo Temno.

=== Ilya Baramiya ===
Baramiya was born on 18 June 1973 and lives in Saint Petersburg. He is a sound engineer and producer. Baramiya started making electronic music in 1997 and has been a member of the groups Yolochniye Igrushki, 2H Company, and Samoe Bolshoe Prostoe Chislo. He was the curator of the "Contemporary Music and Sound Design" area at the Mayak School of Creative Industries.

== History ==
In the fall of 2016, Gaisina contacted Baramiya on social media with the idea of staging a play based on her poetry collection, Sud. Тhe idea evolved as Gaisina and Baramiya worked together, and they ended up forming the group Aigel. In the beginning of 2017, the group held their first concerts in Moscow and St. Petersburg.

On 10 April 2017, Aigel released their debut album, 1190. The title refers to Gaisina's partner's sentence, as he was supposed to spend 1190 days in prison.

On 6 August 2017, the EP Buş Baş (Tatar: «Буш Баш») was released. The title means "empty head" in Tatar.

On 25 August 2017, Aigel released the music video for "Tatarin", directed by Ilya Soloview. As of October 2017, the video had 1.5 million views on YouTube. As of June 2019, it had been viewed about 40 million times. On 9 October 2017, Aigel performed "Tatarin" on the late-night talk show Evening Urgant.

In 2018, Aigel released their second album, Muzyka (Russian: Музыка, lit. 'Music').

In June 2019, Aigel released the music video "Chiotkiy" (Russian: Четкий), directed by Ilya Soloview and starring Danila Kholodkov from Shortparis.

In August 2019, Aigel released their third album, Edem (Russian: Эдем, lit. 'Eden/Adam').

In March 2020, Aigel released the music video "You're Born", directed by Andžejs Gavrišs. Andrey Nikolaev, won the cinematography in a music video award at EnergaCamerimage Film Festival for his work on "You're Born".

In August 2020, Aigel contributed a track to the compilation album For Belarus, intended to support victims of repression in Belarus in connection with the 2020 protests, with proceeds from the album's sales going to the Belarus Solidarity Foundation.

In November 2020, Aigel released their fourth album, Pıyala (Tatar: Пыяла, lit. 'Glass'). All of the songs on Pıyala are in Tatar. The titular track received renewed attention when it was used in the television series The Boy's Word: Blood on the Asphalt in 2023, which led to fans posting their own performances of "Pıyala" translated into other minority languages online.

In September 2022, the band announced that they had been placed on a list of artists whose work was "not recommended" by the Russian government, due to their public opposition to the Russian invasion of Ukraine. Gaisina and Baramiya both left Russia permanently and continued creating music and performing abroad.

== Musical style ==
The group's lyrics mainly describe Gaisina's personal experiences related to her partner's trial and imprisonment and the expectation of his release. Since Gaisina and Baramiya live in different cities, most of their collaboration occurs remotely. Baramiya sends beats to Gaisina, and Gaisina writes lyrics and records her vocals. The musicians had not met in person or even spoken on the phone until their first concert.

Most of Aigel's songs were written by Gaisina specifically for performance to music, but some of the lyrics come from poems written earlier and then adapted to music. Baramiya has cited Run the Jewels as an influence.

== Discography ==
=== Studio albums ===
- 1190 (2017)
- Muzyka (Russian: Музыка, lit. 'Music')(2018)
- Edem (Russian: Эдем, lit. 'Eden/Adam') (2019)
- Pıyala (Tatar: Пыяла, lit. 'Glass') (2020)
- Killer Qız (2025)

=== EPs ===
- Buş Baş (Tatar: Буш Баш) (2017)
- RMX (2017)
- Ofigeno (Russian: Офигенно) (2020)

=== Guest appearances ===
- "Voodoo Doll" — Velial Squad featuring Aigel, from the 2019 album Golovu na plakhu (Russian: Голову на плаху)

=== Music videos ===
- "Tatarin" (Russian: «Татарин») (25 August 2017)
- "1190" (5 December 2017)
- "Prints na belom" (Russian: «Принц на белом») (15 May 2018)
- "Dukhi ognya" (Russian: «Духи огня») (5 October 2018)
- "Chetkii" (Russian: «Четкий») (7 June 2019)
- "Sneg" (Russian: «Снег») (6 September 2019)
- "Ono vydelyalo teplo" (Russian: «Оно выделяло тепло») (lyric video) (26 December 2019)
- "You're Born" (12 March 2020)
- "Dve nedeli" (Russian: «Две недели») (10 April 2020)

== Awards and nominations ==
Award	Year	Nominee(s)	Category	Result	Ref.
Austin Music Video Festival	2021	"You're Born"	Best Cinematography	Nominated	
Austin Music Video Festival	2021	"You're Born"	Best Director	Won	
Austin Music Video Festival	2021	"You're Born"	Best Narrative	Nominated	
Austin Music Video Festival	2021	"You're Born"	Video of the Year	Nominated	
Berlin Music Video Awards	2018	"Tatarin"	Best Editor	Won	
Berlin Music Video Awards	2018	"1190"	Best Cinematography	Nominated	
Berlin Music Video Awards	2020	"You're Born"	Best Director	Nominated	
Berlin Music Video Awards	2025	"Children's Sea"	Best Song	Nominated	

At the 2017 Jager Music Awards, Aigel won Video of the Year for "Tatarin".
