= HushPuppies =

French garage rock and indie rock band

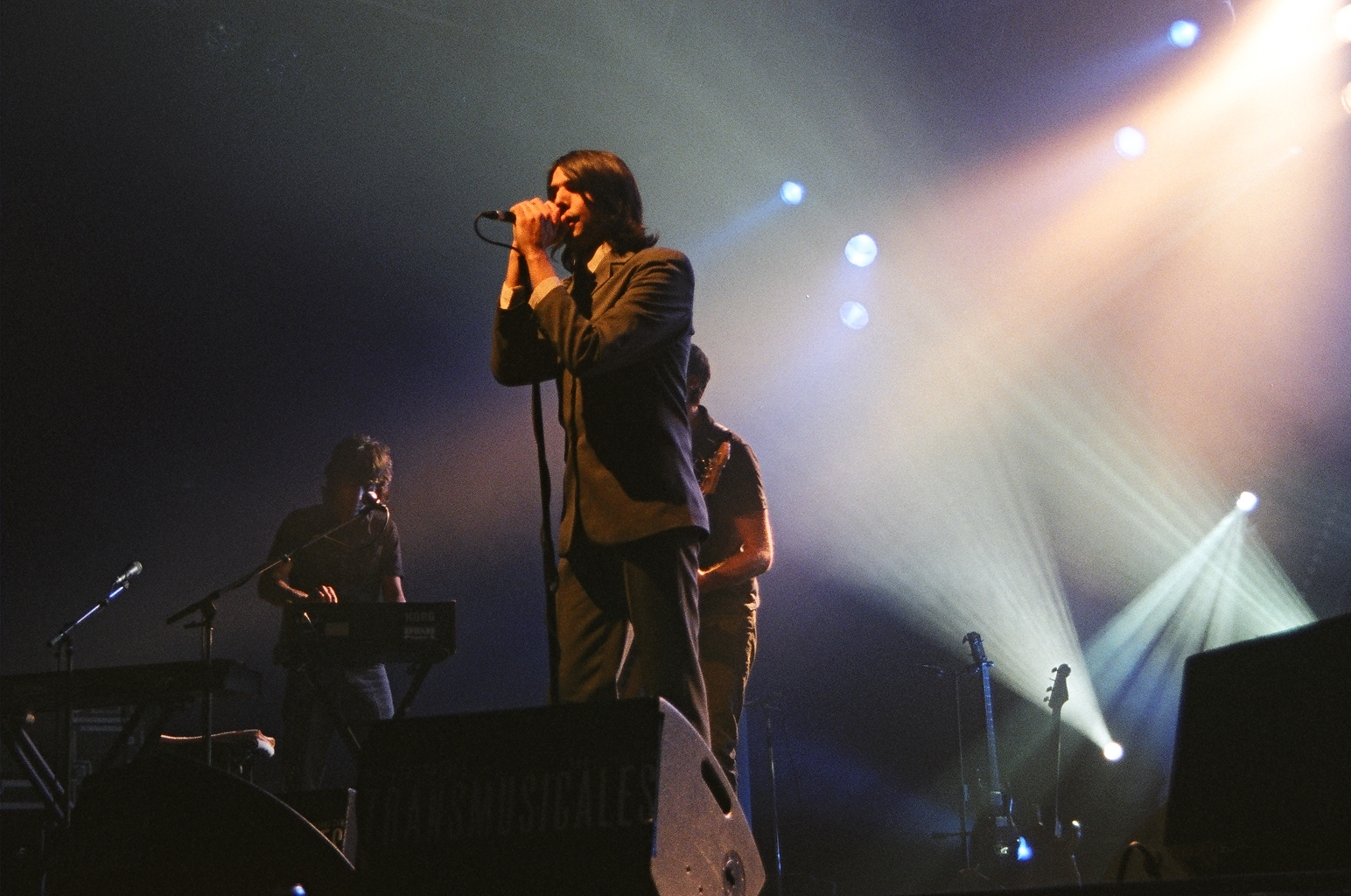
- HushPuppies at Trans Musicales 2004 in Rennes

Background information
- Origin: Paris, France
- Genres: Garage rock, indie rock
- Years active: 2003–present
- Label: Diamondtraxx
- Members: Olivier Jourdan; Cyrille Sudraud; Franck Pompidor; Guillaume Le Guen; Wilfried Jourdan
- Website: www.hushpuppiestheband.com

HushPuppies is a French garage rock and indie rock band influenced by the various bands of the 1960s. Members of the group live in Paris, France, although originate from Perpignan and Bordeaux.

== Members ==
- Singer: Olivier Jourdan
- Guitar: Cyrille Sudraud
- Drums: Franck Pompidor
- Bass guitar: Guillaume Le Guen
- Keyboard: Wilfried Jourdan (Olivier's brother)

== Biography ==
Four of the band's members - Franck, Cyrille, Wilfried and Olivier - grew up in Perpignan, where they formed a group with others called the Likyds. This group specialised largely in cover versions of 1960s garage rock songs. The band split with four members later reuniting in Paris where they met up with Guillaume Le Guen from Bordeaux. This led to the formation in 2002 of HushPuppies.

The band describe their influences as being 1960s groups such as The Kinks, The Who and Small Faces.

In April 2003, their first demo went on sale, followed by a 12 track live album Live @ House of Live. In 2004, two EPs were released. The Garden being their first public presentation.

The following year, the band's first album, The Trap, went on sale. On September 13, they played for a live concert on a London bus, in Paris with a French radio, Le Mouv. The album became an independent hit, selling more than 20,000 copies.

The band's second album, Silence is Golden, was released in November 2008.

In 2008, their song "You're Gonna Say Yeah!" was featured on the soundtrack of Guitar Hero World Tour.

The band's fourth album titled Bipolar Drift was released in 2011.

== Discography ==
=== EP ===
- HushPuppies EP - 2004
1. Natasha
2. Classic
3. HushPuppies
4. All I Know
- The Garden - 2004
1. HushPuppies
2. You And Me
3. Pale Blue Eyes
4. Automatic 6
- You're Gonna Say Yeah! - 2005
1. You're Gonna Say Yeah!
2. Packt Up Like Sardines in a Crushtin Box
- Single EP
1. I'm Not Like Everybody Else
2. CPPDCC (Ca Peut Plus Durer Comme Ca)
3. Packt Up Like Sardines in a Crushtin Box (Live)
- Bad Taste And Gold On The Doors EP - 2008
1. Bad Taste And Gold On The Doors (I want my Kate Moss) (Radio Edit)
2. Bad Taste And Gold On The Doors (I want my Kate Moss) (Cucumber Remix)
3. Bad Taste And Gold On The Doors (I want my Kate Moss) (Munk & Thelonious Remix)

=== Albums ===
- The Trap - 2005
1. 1975
2. Packt Up Like Sardines in a Crushtin Box
3. You're Gonna Say Yeah!
4. Marthelot 'N' Clavencine
5. Sorry So
6. Pale Blue Eyes
7. Comptine
8. Bassautobahn
9. Alice in Wonderland
10. Single
11. You & Me
12. The Trap
13. Automatic 6
- Silence Is Golden - 2007
1. A Trip To Vienna
2. Lost Organ
3. Moloko Sound Club
4. Bad Taste And Gold On The Doors
5. Love Bandit
6. Down, Down, Down
7. Fiction In The Facts
8. Lunatic's Song
9. Hot Shot
10. Broken Matador
11. Harmonium
- The Bipolar Drift - 2010/2011
1. Open Season
2. Okinawa Living Wage
3. Stop
4. Low Compromise Democracy
5. Zero One
6. Every Night I Fight Some Giant
7. Frozen Battle
8. A Dog Day
9. Poison Apple
10. Rodeo
11. Twin Sister

=== Live album ===
- Live @ House Of Live - 2003
1. Turn on the light
2. You ain't better
3. C song
4. Six feet under
5. Emma
6. Ça peut plus durer
7. All I Know
8. Natasha
9. Anybody's answer
10. HushPuppies
11. Classik
12. Behave
