= Stanislav Baretsky =

Russian musician (born 1972)

Stanislav Baretsky Станислав Барецкий
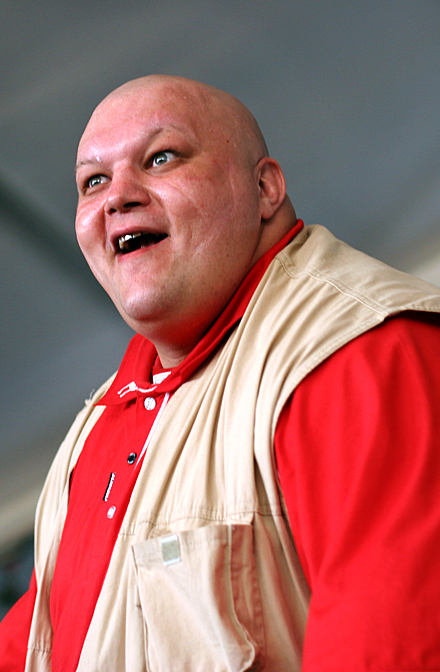

Background information
- Born: 8 March 1972 (age 54); Lomonosov, Leningrad, Russian SFSR, Soviet Union
- Genres: Turbo chanson Rock; Russian chanson Rap; Experimental music Electronic music Recitative; Intelligent dance music Performance art
- Formerly of: Leningrad (band)

Stanislav Valereyevich Baretsky (born 8 March 1972) is a Russian musician. He has worked with the groups Leningrad and EU.

== Biography ==
Baretsky worked as a gravedigger and security guard in the 1990s, later unsuccessfully running a cafe and market. He wrote poetry as a young man. In 2002 he made songs based on this work. In the period from 2003 to 2004 he recorded two solo albums, Цензура ("Censorship") and Цензура-2 ("Censorship-2"). Neither of these albums brought Baretsky stardom.

In 2004 he worked with the group named EU. They released an album in 2005, Электронщина (Elektronschina) featuring a stencil of his face on the cover. He performed at concerts with EU in Moscow and St Petersburg. He then worked with the group Leningrad, writing lyrics for a song.

Baretsky is best known for his aggressive and anti-west stances. He frequently picks fights on television shows and radio interviews, sometimes being invited specifically to cause trouble. Baretsky is vocally antiimport and anti anything he deems capitalistic. He often draws a crowd to witness him make these statements. In 2015, Baretsky drove his BMW into a field and lit it on fire to promote Russian industry. He announces that all imported goods are evil and they should be destroyed. He then burns his BMW and drives away in a Russian made Lada Kalina. Baretsky is also known for biting into beer cans and twisting them apart, spraying those around him.

== Creation ==
He began to write poetry at the age of 14, and only in 2002 decided to write songs based on them.

“In general, I never intended to write songs. And then we talked somehow with a sound engineer friend, Kolya. I have been writing poetry since I was fourteen, but I have never shown it to anyone. He says: “Let's try to record.” - “And who will sing?” - “Yes, you will sing.” I went to the microphone, gave out something ... Over the evening, we recorded two songs. And Kolya had garter on Radio Chanson. And bam, I’m somehow listening to the Chanson radio, and there is my song. I was just shocked."

In the period from 2003 to 2004 he recorded two solo albums published on the trap label: "Censorship" and "Censorship-2". Some of the songs were on the radio "Petrograd - Russian Chanson."

In 2004, his work became interested in the electronic duo "Christmas tree toys", located in the same city. They invited him to record an album and give concerts in clubs. The album "Electronschina" has become one of the most striking musical events of 2005. At the beginning of 2006, Baretsky had several successful performances in Ukraine with other musicians from the collection "Forbidden Variety" except for "Christmas Tree Toys", including with 2H Company; in Kyiv, the entrance to the concert had to be closed when 600 people gathered. On 7 March 2006, Stas performed at the Moscow club "Ikra" after the presentation of the album YOI "Warm Math" ("Warm Mathematics") and a performance by 2H Company; some listeners left the room.

Stas Baretsky made an indelible impression on me. I believe this is Viktor Tsoi of our time. And he holds the microphone, like Tsoi - slightly blocking the lower part of the face with his elbow and proudly raising his chin. Hokku man!

— Gleb Davydov

In addition to concerts with Christmas tree decorations in Moscow and St. Petersburg, Stas joined the concert of the Leningrad group, wrote lyrics for the songs Sky Heaven and Credit for the album Bread. According to Baretsky, he no longer speaks with Leningrad, because he doesn’t call Cords, but he doesn’t want to ask. While with the "Christmas tree toys", he believes that "they did not agree on the characters in terms of music", as the band’s musicians prefer to engage in creative experiments, and Baretsky suggested "stupidly make turbochanson and ride in clubs".

=== Brother 3 ===
In 2019, he announced his desire to make the film "Brother 3".

== Discography ==
- Цензура - Censorship - 2003
- Цензура-2 - Censorship-2 - 2004
- Электронщина - Elektronschina - 2005 (with EU (group))
- Тут по ящику нам дали (together with Andrei Erofeev) (not officially published)
- Романтик Блядь Коллекшн - Romantic Fucking Collection - 2011
- Дискотека - Discoteca - 2013
- Девяностые - Nineties - 2014
- Умереть за попсу! - 2015
- Нулевые - 2015
- Малиновый пиджак - 2015
- Турбодискотека - 2015

== Filmography ==
- 2-Асса-2 2009
- Жесть Миллионов - Zhest Million - 2010
- Шапито-шоу - Tent Show - 2011
- Литейный - Casting - 2011
- Give me your money- Little Big- 2015
- Brother 3 - 2020
