= Avant Festival =

Russian Music Festival

Avant Festival (Avantfest, Avant Fest, Фестиваль Авант) was an annual international music festival, which took place in Russia. The festival began in 2004 and ran until 2013 in various venues in Moscow.

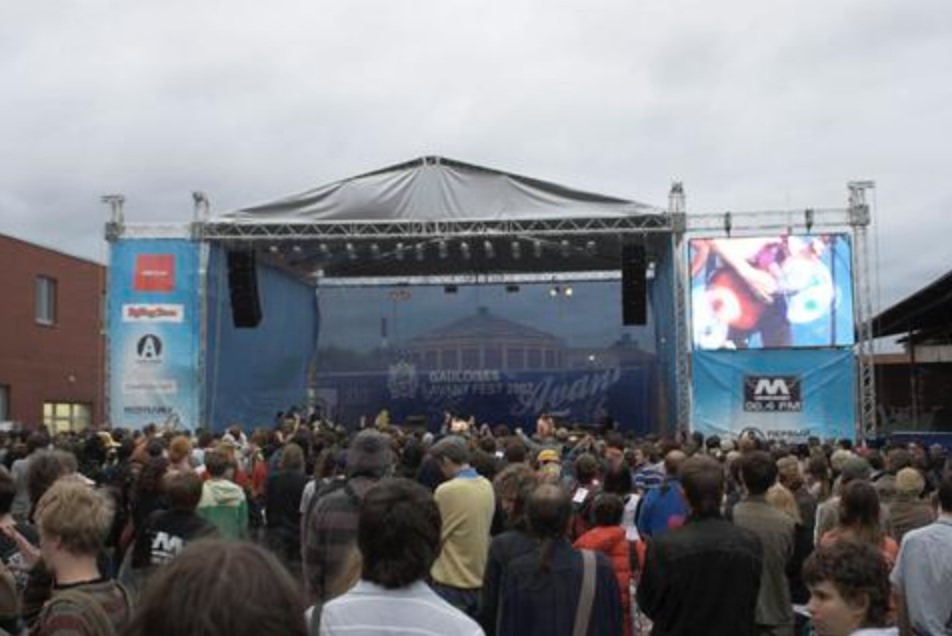
Avantfest 2007, Moscow

== Overview and history ==
Avantfest was held for the first time in Moscow in May of 2004. The headliners for the 2004 festival were Russian bands Tequilajazzz, Silence Kit and American band Xiu Xiu.

The British band HOOD was one of the main headliners of the 2005 festival, alongside Jamie Lidell and iconic Russian musicians Leonid Fedorov (frontman of the band АукцЫон) and Televizor.

In the later years the festival hosted numerous Russian indie bands and foreign acts, including Mudhoney, Explosions in the Sky, The Horrors, Yann Tiersen, Devendra Banhart, Swans, Liars, Patrick Wolf, Spiritualized, Chinawoman (Michelle Gurevitch), Arab Strap, Xiu Xiu, Tim Hecker, Deerhoof, The Notwist, Lali Puna, And you will know us by the trail of dead, Wire, Lou Rhodes, 65daysofstatic, Ladybug Transistor, Why?, Shitdisco, Asobi Sexu, I Am Kloot, Jarboe, We Have Band, CocoRosie, Oceansize, Luke Vibert, British Sea Power, etc. 2013 was the 10th year in a row that the festival was staged.

The festival promoted young Russian musicians and organized tours of foreign acts in Russia. Avantfest also organized several music venues in Moscow, among which were the venues "Aktovy Zal" (in 2006-2009) and AvantClub in the ArtPlay art cluster (in 2010-2011).

Avantfest organizing team also handled the booking and production of the Ahmad Tea Music Festival in Moscow in 2011 and 2012, which featured performances of Klaxons, Maximo Park, Anthony Hegarty, I am Kloot and Erland and the Carnival.

In 2016 Avantfest was held in the cultural center TEXTIL in the city of Yaroslavl, with Glintshake, Lucidvox, Ambidextrous, Kira Lao and other Russian bands. Silver Apples played at the festival's after-party at the Moscow club "16 Tons".

Avantfest held in Russia, should not be confused with the Avant Art Festival, which has been held in Poland since 2008.
