= Dayte tank (!) =

Russian rock band

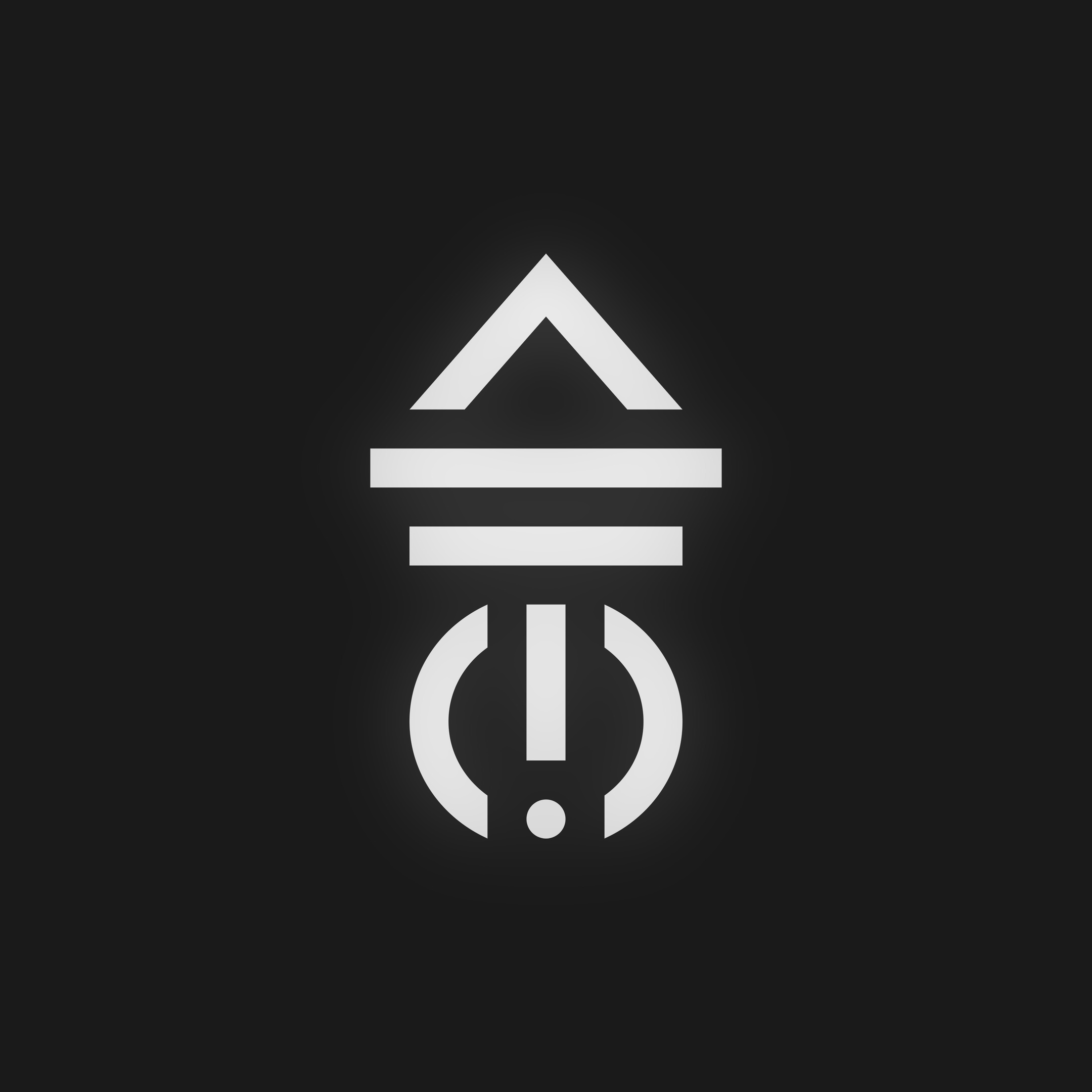
- Band logo

Background information
- Origin: Kolomna, Russia
- Genres: garage rock punk rock indie rock
- Years active: 2007–present
- Members: Dmitry Mozzhukhin; Maxim Kulsha; Sergey Akimov; Alexander Timofeev; Ilya Gerasimenko
- Website: http://daitetank.ru/

Dayte tank (!) (Russian: Дайте танк (!), romanized: Daite tank, lit. 'Give us a tank (!)', [ˈdaɪ̯tʲɪ ˈtank]) is a Russian rock band from Kolomna, founded by Dmitry Mozzhukhin and Alexander Romankin in 2007. Today, the collective consists of five musicians. Until 2011, the group was called "Give Us A Tank (!)". It comes from "giveusatank" - a cheat code from the video game GTA 3.

== Line-up ==
=== Current line-up ===
- Dmitry Mozzhukhin - vocals, guitar
- Maxim Kulsha - guitar
- Sergey Akimov - bass guitar
- Alexander Timofeev - saxophone
- Ilya Gerasimenko - drums

=== Former members ===
- Alexander Romankin - guitar
- Yuri Gaer - drums
- Victor Dryzhov - drums
- Anton Makarov - keyboard
- Mikhail Fomin - guitar

== Discography ==
=== Studio albums ===
==== As Give Us A Tank (!) ====
Date of Release	Title	Translation
2007	ДСП в головах	Particle board in the heads
2008	Дивный прибор	Wonderful device
2009	Дебют на светлой (EP)	Debut on the light

==== As Dayte tank (!) ====
Date of Release	Title	Translation
2011	Время собирать щебень	Time to collect rubble
2011	Альбом, который не считается	An album that doesn't count
2011	Универсамка	Universal female (a pun with Russian word “universam” — universal shop of self-service and “samka” - female)
2013	Сохранить как	Save as
2014	Интим	Intimacy
2015	Глаза боятся	The eyes are afraid
2016	Радио Огонь	Radio Fire
2016	Альбом для фортепиано (EP)	Album for piano
2017	См. рис. 1	See Figure 1
2018	См. рис. 2	See Figure 2
2018	На вырост (EP)	For growth (Russian phrase meaning clothes that will fit a person as they grow, generally meant for children)
2020	Человеко-часы	Man Hours
2021	Слова-паразиты	Parasite words (Russian phrase meaning "filler words")
2025	Хрупко	Fragile
2026	Радио Пепел	Radio Ash

=== Singles ===
Date of Release	Title	Translation
2013	Маленький	Young
2015	Паника	Panic
2020	Люди	People
2020	Крепость	Fortress
2020	Шанс	Chance
2025	Логика	Logic
2025	Эфир	On Air/Live
2025	Рекурсия	Recursion
2026	Песня	Song

=== Video ===
1. Впереди
2. Вуаля
3. Шалаш
4. Из земли
5. Love-love
6. Утро
7. Друг
8. Спам
9. Шум
10. Смешно
11. Я
12. Мы
13. Вы
14. Волна
15. Крепость
16. Шанс
17. Сказки

== Interviews ==
- Арс-Пегас (2012-02-12). "«ЛитВоск с АРСОМ-ПЕГАСОМ», выпуск №1". rusotv.org.
- Алиса Павлова, Стёпа Ботарёв (2015-09-24). "Дима Мозжухин: «Я только записывал и плакал»". modernrock.ru.
- "Поговорим про - "Дайте танк (!)" - МУЛЬТФИЛЬМЫ | ЗАПАД | ЛОКАЛИЗАЦИЯ". Хрущёвка. 2016-03-28.
- Сергей Коростелев (2016-06-20). "Дмитрий Мозжухин: «Я превратился в песню»". musecube.org.
- Галла Гинтовт (2018-03-25). "Как «Дайте танк (!)» брали у «Ады» интервью и наоборот". Сцена. Сторона. Archived from the original on 2020-02-20.
- Lisovskiy Mishan (2018-10-12). "Разговор с «Танком»". Издательский Дом «Новый Взгляд».
- Владимир Завьялов (2019-01-23). ""Я обычный»: лидер «Дайте танк (!)» о Коломне, русском роке и фестивале «Боль"". daily.afisha.ru.
- Юлия Тихомирова (2019-06-04). "Беседа с «Дайте танк (!)»". nevvod.ru.
- Олеся Гудыма (2019-06-12). "Солист группы «Дайте Танк(!)» Дмитрий Мозжухин о бесконечном детстве и игре во всех смыслах". НН Собака.ru.
- Кирилл Мишин (2019-11-08). "Солист группы «Дайте танк (!)» в Воронеже: «Всегда считал, что я чуть-чуть старик»". Комсомольская Правда.
