= EU (group) =

Russian electronic music group

EU Ёлочные игрушки
- Origin: Russia
- Genres: IDM; EDM
- Years active: 1997—2013
- Labels: Art-tek, PAUSE 2 Recordings, Legkie, Snegiri, Cheburec Records, Elektrus
- Members: Ilya Baramiya; Alexander Zaytsev
- Website: http://eumusic.bandcamp.com/

EU or Ёлочные игрушки ("Christmas tree decorations") is a Russian electronic music group, generally considered to be part of the IDM genre, formed in 1997 in Saint Petersburg, and consisting of Sasha Zaitsev and Ilya Baramiya.

They have also worked with Stanislav Baretsky.

== Partial discography ==
- Warm Math (Pause 2)
- Christmas Baubles and Their Strange Sounds (Lo Recordings)
- Tuner (Pause 2)
- Reframing (Pause 2)
- Электронщина (Electronschina) 2005
