= Monetochka =

Russian singer-songwriter (born 1998)

Monetochka Монеточка
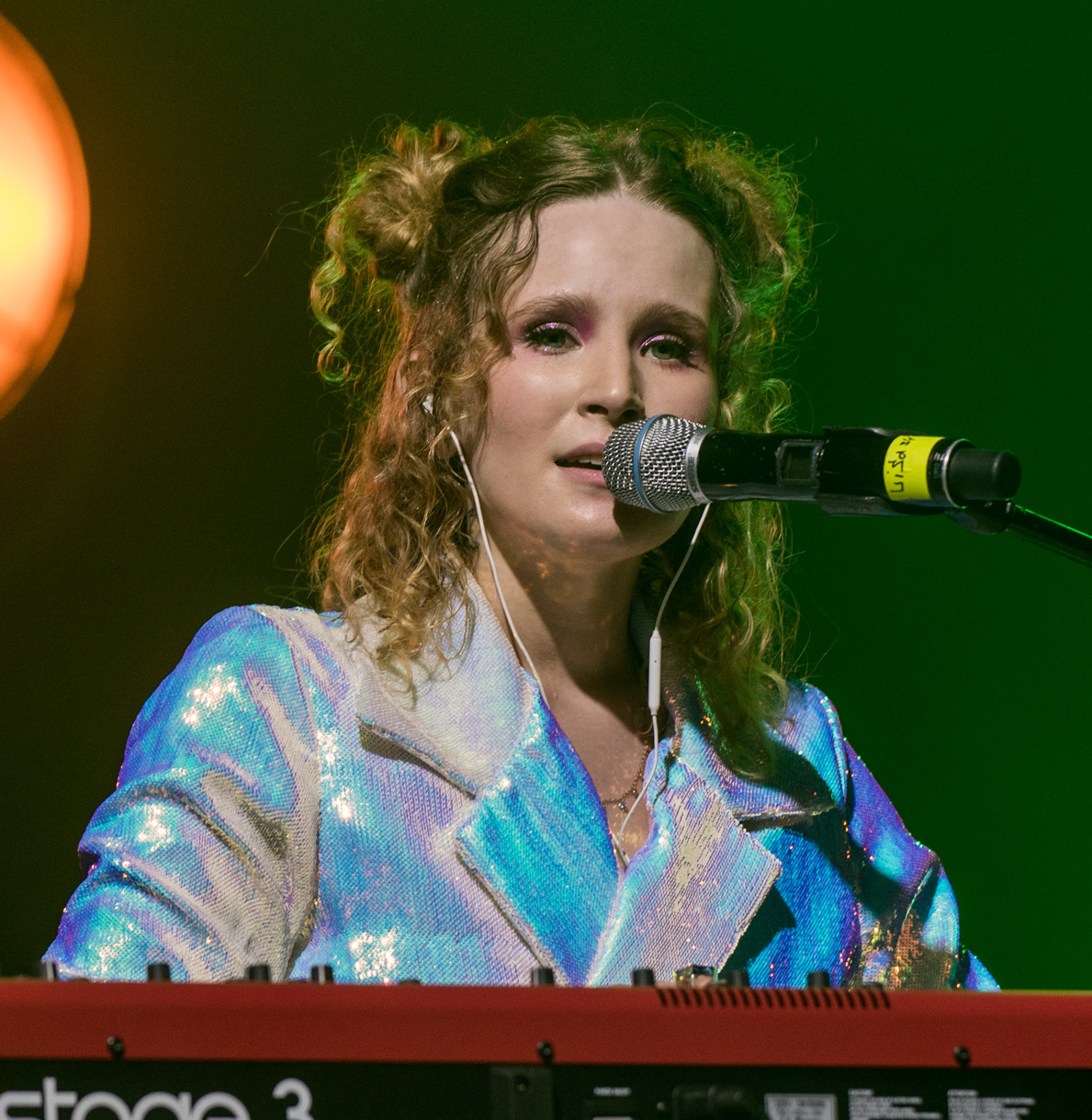
- Monetochka in 2019

Background information
- Also known as: Liza, Liza Moneta
- Born: Yelizaveta Andreyevna Gyrdymova; 1 June 1998 (age 28); Yekaterinburg, Russia
- Genres: Indie pop; alternative pop; pop rock; electronic; lo-fi
- Instruments: Vocals; keyboard
- Years active: 2015–present

Yelizaveta Andreyevna Gyrdymova (Russian: Елизаве́та Андре́евна Гырды́мова; born 1 June 1998), better known by her stage name Monetochka (Russian: Моне́точка, lit. 'Little Coin'), is a Russian pop rock singer-songwriter.

== Early life and education ==
Elizaveta Gyrdymova was born on 1 June 1998 in Yekaterinburg. Her father worked in the construction industry, and her mother in the tourism industry.

In 2005, she enrolled in a school with advanced studies of music, where she learned to play the piano. From childhood, Elizaveta enjoyed writing poetry and published her work on the site Stihi.ru as a teenager.

In 2014, she entered tenth grade at the Specialized Educational and Scientific Center of the Ural Federal University. In 2016, she enrolled in correspondence courses in film production at the Gerasimov Institute of Cinematography in Moscow. She chose the school because of her love of classic cinema.

Since September 2016, she has continued her studies, and her first internship was at the ETV channel in her native Yekaterinburg, where she released joint projects with the poet Alexandra Aksyonova. She then worked for some time as a producer at ETV.

== Musical career ==
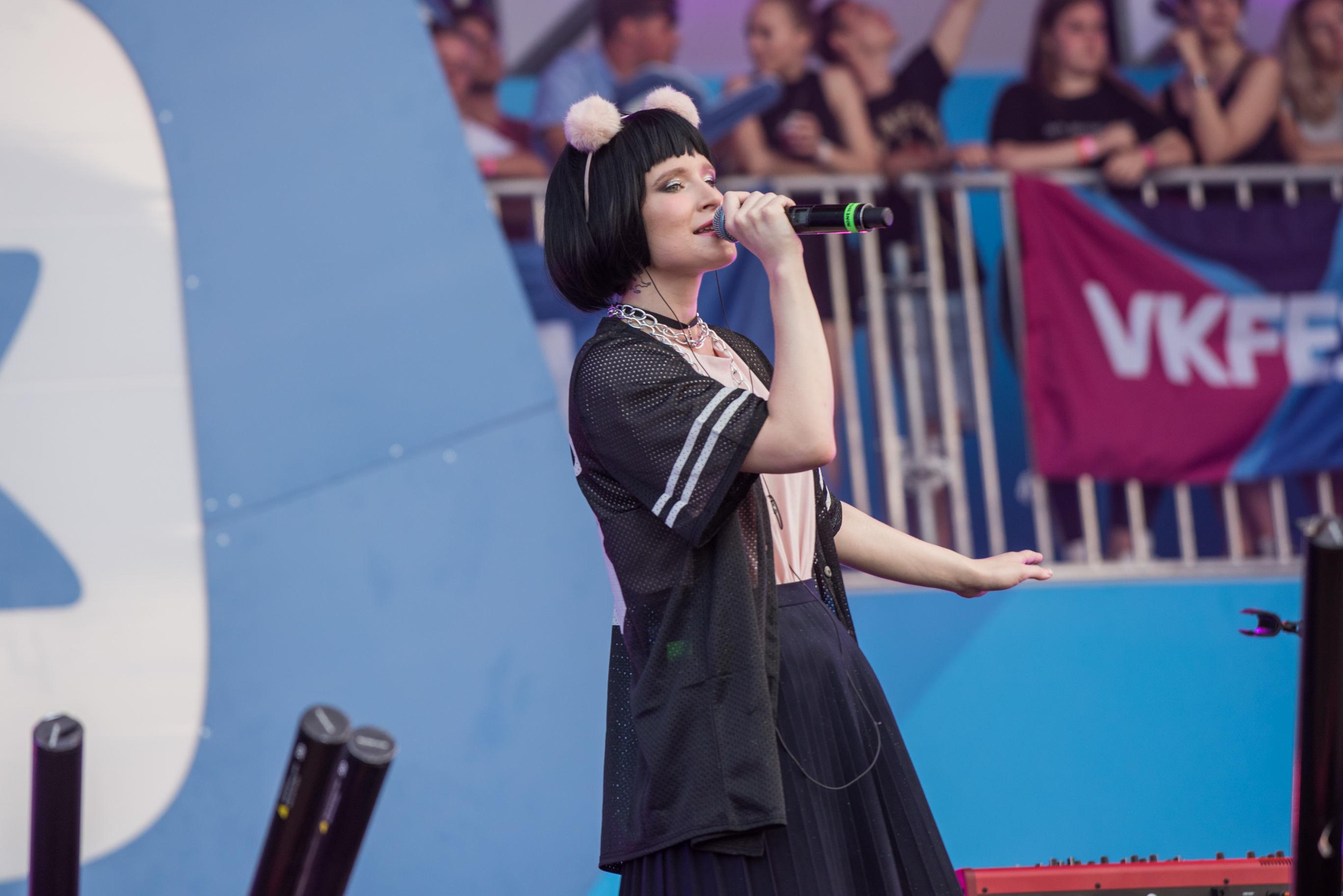
Monetochka performing at VK Fest 2018 in Saint Petersburg

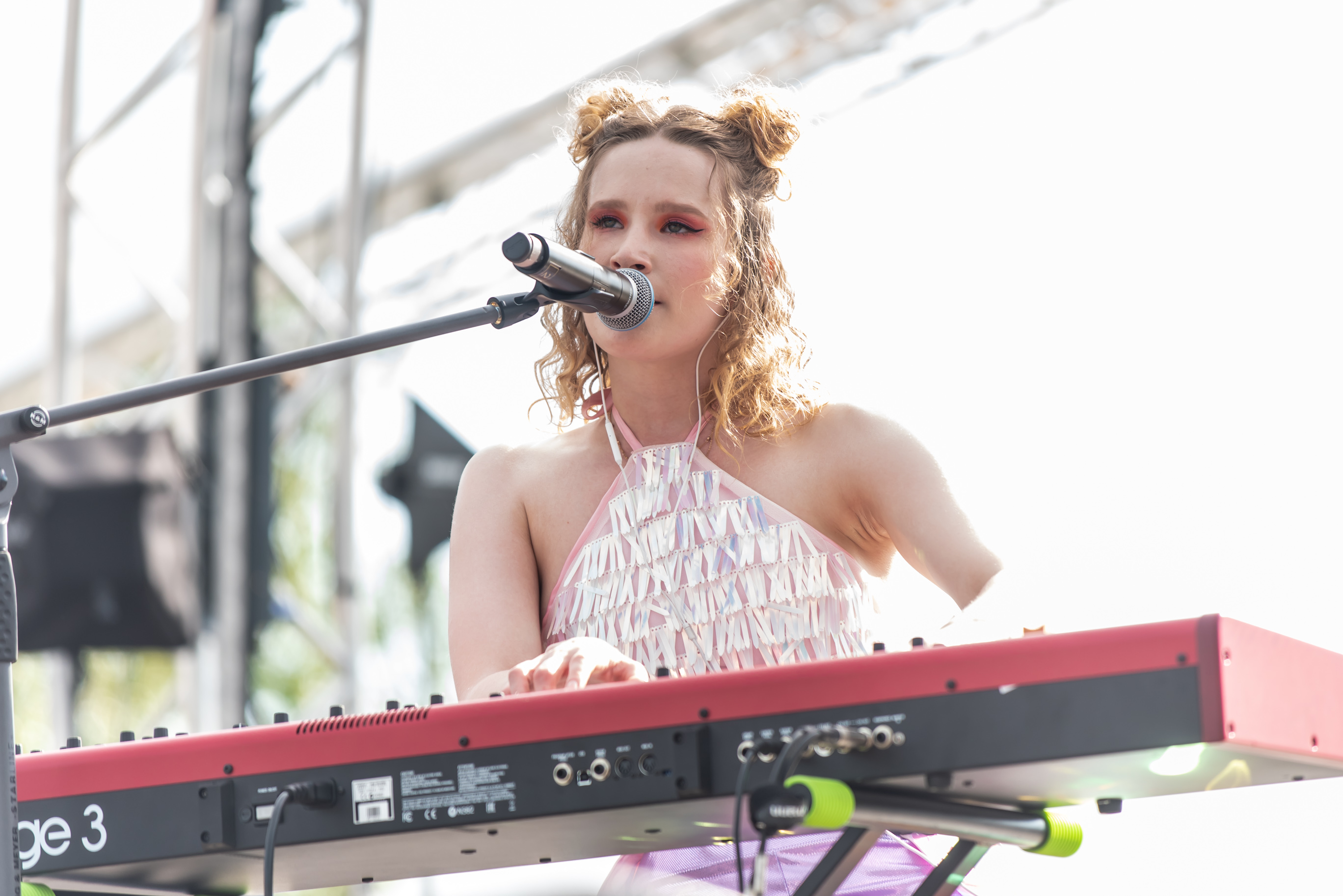
Monetochka performing at VK Fest 2019 in Saint Petersburg

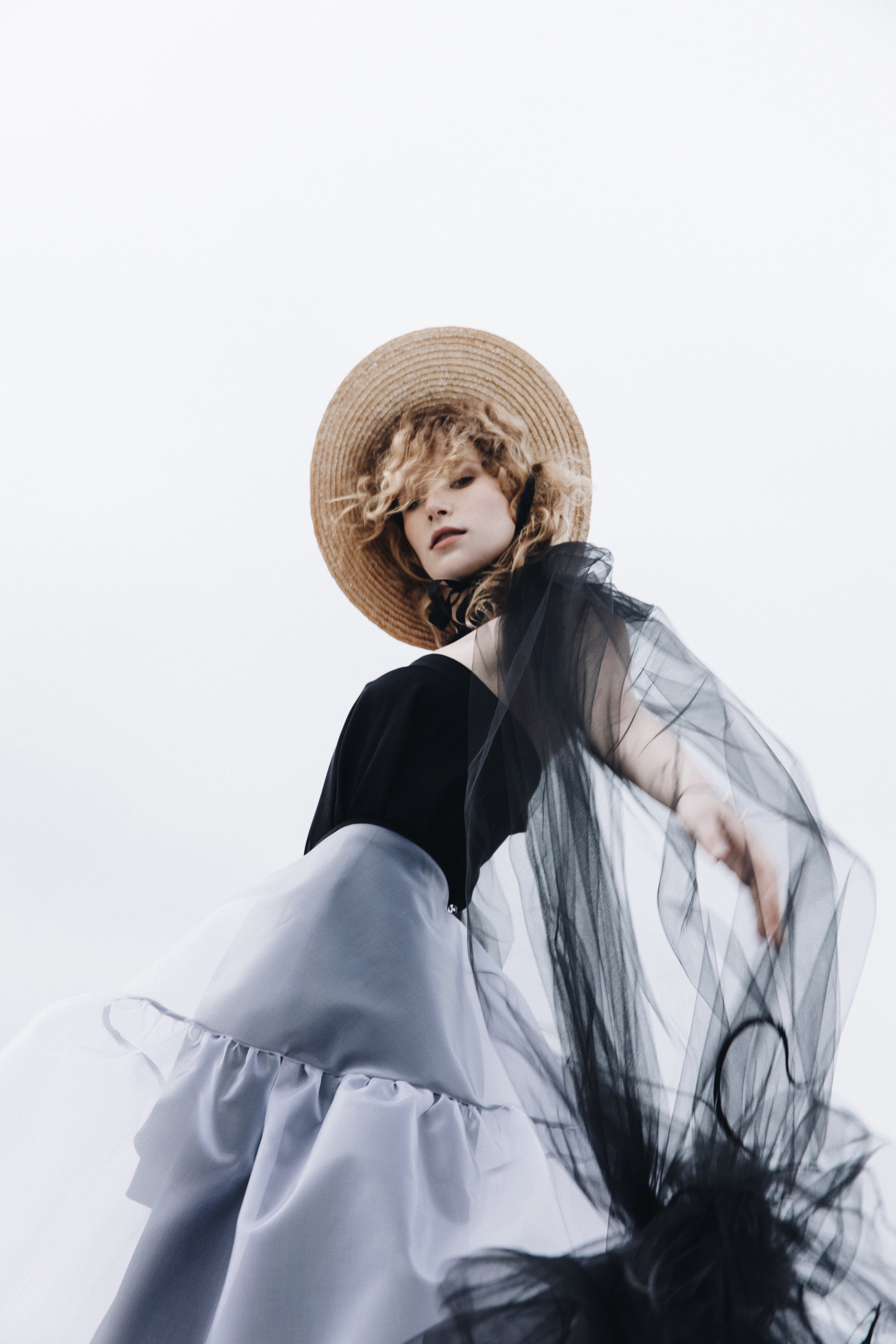
Shooting for concert posters by Julia Mayorova

At the end of 2015, Gyrdymova uploaded her first album, Psychedelic Cloud-Rap (Russian: «Психоделический клауд рэп», romanized: Psikhodelicheskiy klaud rep), to the social network VKontakte under the stage name Monetochka. She recorded the songs at home on a synthesizer. Soon after, she began uploading videos of her live performances to YouTube.

On 22 January 2016, she officially released Psychedelic Cloud Rap. The album was posted in one of the popular social network communities and quickly went viral. By the end of February, she had over 20,000 followers on her VKontakte page and received offers to give concerts and interviews.

In January 2017, Monetochka released the video for the song "Left for a Realist" (Russian: «Ушла к реалисту»). On 1 June 2017 the video for the song "Childfree" (Russian: «Чайлдфри»), recorded with Noize MC, was released. The song and video became the subject of a scandal. The Moscow lawyer Sergei Afanasyev wrote to the prosecutor's office to check "Childfree" for legal violations, claiming that the lyrics promoted teen suicide.

In 2017, Monetochka began to collaborate with the alternative R&B musician and producer Viktor "BTsKh" Isaev. Their first collaboration, the single "The Last Disco Party" (Russian: «Последняя дискотека», romanized: Poslednyaya diskoteka), was released on 31 October 2017.

On 25 May 2018, Monetochka released her first studio album, Coloring for Adults (Russian: «Раскраски для взрослых», romanized: Raskraski dlya vzroslykh), produced by Isaev. According to the press release, Coloring for Adults marked a new sound for Monetochka, "containing musical references to the 1980s and 1990s, contemporary club music, music from cartoons, and even folklore." The album contains multiple references to the late Soviet rock musician Viktor Tsoi, including a musical quote from the Kino song "I Want Change!" (Russian: «Хочу перемен!») and lyrics mentioning a "weary Tsoi".

On 28 May 2018, Monetochka performed the song "Every Time" (Russian: «Каждый раз») on the late-night talk show Evening Urgant. In his introduction, the host, Ivan Urgant, said that some critics considered Monetochka's new album "one of the major Russian-language albums of this year." On 1 June 2018, a concert presentation of the new album took place in Moscow.

On 2 October 2020, Monetochka released the studio album Arts and Crafts (Russian: «Декоративно-прикладное искусство», romanized: Dekorativno-prikladnoe iskusstvo).

In 2022, Monetochka toured with Noize MC, raising over €200,000 for a Polish charity that helped refugees resulting from the Russian invasion of Ukraine.

Monetochka's song "Monopoly" was used as a part of the soundtrack for the 2026 movie Spider-Man: Brand New Day. It was cut from the distribution of the film both in Ukraine (after complaints by activists that the public does not want to hear "a Russian singer") and in Russia where Monetochka's songs are prohibited, due to her status of "foreign agent".

== Critical reception ==
In a review of Psychedelic Cloud Rap on the InterMedia website, the music critic Alexei Mazhaev wrote that "in Liza's music, stiob is combined with sanity on the verge of cynicism", and "excellent command of words, a sense of language and accurate orientation in the signs of the times are seasoned with charming naivety."

According to music journalist Aleksandr Gorbachev (Meduza), despite the fact that Monetochka started off as an Internet meme, she did not share the formulaic path of short-lived celebrity. Comparing the singer's songs from Psychedelic Cloud Rap to the new songs of Coloring for Adults, Gorbachev notes that "the toylike childishness of Monetochka's early music has grown into something far more complex in this album."

The poet Vera Polozkova spoke about Monetochka's success in the following way: "This is absolutely a child telling you about what is happening around you, with such irreconcilability which you would never have dared to use yourself."

Maria Engström claims that "Monetochka’s album [Coloring for Adults] today is the only intelligible manifesto of the aesthetics of Putin’s fourth term in office."

The singer Zemfira called Monetochka's lyrics "excellent", but said she considered the singer's voice "repulsive".

Boris Barabanov named "Every Time" one of the 16 top songs of 2018 and wrote that by releasing Coloring for Adults, Monetochka "managed to break the framework of the independent scene and break into the mainstream."

=== Childfree and accusations of promoting suicide ===
On June 28, 2018, Moscow lawyer Sergei Afanasyev said that the prosecutor's office, at his request, began checking the song "Childfree" of Monetochka and Noize MC for, in his view, calls for adolescent suicide in the song, specifically in the following lyrics:

Listen to my advice in MP3 format: don't wait until you get old, rather die. It's a shame your parents aren't childfree. Burn in hell, burn in hell!

Vitaly Milonov, a deputy from United Russia, was also extremely outraged by this work and said in an interview that medical experiments should be carried out on Monetochka and Noize MC.

However, many famous people defended the performers, stating that one cannot judge the entire composition by a phrase taken out of context. For example, Mikhail Osadchiy, Vice-Rector for Science of the State Institute of Russian Language, spoke as follows:

If you carefully read the text, then in it you will see not propaganda for suicide, nor incitement to suicide, but ridicule of suicides committed due to influence by the media. The text, of course, is devoted to the negative impact of the information field of modern society on a person.

== Charts ==
In December 2016, Monetochka's track "Gosha Rubchinskiy" (Russian: «Гоша Рубчинский») was ranked 11th in The Flow's "50 Best Tracks of 2016."

In January 2017, Psychedelic Cloud Rap was ranked 6th in The Flow's "33 Best Russian Albums of 2016". Psychedelic Cloud Rap was 14th in the list of the 20 best Russian albums in Afisha Daily's "40 Albums of the Year" for 2016. In December 2017, "Poslednyaya diskoteka" was ranked 17th in The Flow's "50 Best Tracks of 2017."

In 2018, at the Jager Music Awards, Monetochka won in the categories "Group of the Year" and "Single of the Year" with the song "Every Time". All 10 songs from Coloring for Adults entered Yandex Music's Top 100 chart within three days of the album's release. The song "Nympho" received the highest ranking, reaching number one in the chart. In summing up the music of 2018, Yandex Music named Monetochka as the breakthrough artist of the year and noted that "Every Time" was one of the most streamed tracks across their markets. The Flow ranked Monetochka's tracks "90s" and "Every Time" in the 20th and first places, respectively, in their list of the 50 best tracks of 2018, and according to the results of a popular vote, Coloring for Adults came third among the best albums of 2018 and first among pop albums of the year.

== Personal life ==
In December, 2020 Monetochka married musician and producer Vitya Isaev (a.k.a. Victor Emelin). In May 2022 the couple left Russia for Lithuania.

In January 2023, due to her speaking out against the war in Ukraine, the Russian Ministry of Justice included Gyrdymova in the list of "foreign agents". In September 2024 a criminal case was opened against her for "evading the duties of a foreign agent". She went into exile and currently resides in Lithuania. In 2026, a Russian judge sentenced her in absentia to one year in prison.

== Discography ==
=== Albums ===
- 2016 — Psychedelic Cloud Rap (Russian: «Психоделический клауд рэп», romanized: Psikhodelicheskiy klaud rep)
- 2018 — Coloring for Adults (Russian: «Раскраски для взрослых», romanized: Raskraski dlya vzroslykh)
- 2020 — Arts and Crafts (Russian: «Декоративно-прикладное искусство», romanized: Dekorativno-prikladnoe iskusstvo)
- 2024 — Prayers. Jokes. Toasts (Russian: Молитвы. Анекдоты. Тосты, romanized: Molitvy. Anekdoty. Tosty)

=== Mini-albums ===
- 2017 — I'm Liza (Russian: Я Лиза, romanized: Ya Liza, lit. 'I'm Liza')

=== Singles ===
- 2016 — "Gosha Rubchinskiy" (Russian: «Гоша Рубчинский»)
- 2016 — "Capital" (Russian: «Капитал», romanized: Kapital)
- 2016 — "Trump Ace" (Russian: «Козырный туз», romanized: Kozyrnyy tuz)
- 2016 — "Left for a Realist" (Russian: «Ушла к реалисту», romanized: Ushla k realistu)
- 2016 — "Factory" (Russian: «Завод», romanized: Zavod)
- 2016 — "Hello, Angelina" (Russian: «Здравствуйте, Анджелина», romanized: Zdravstvuyte, Andzhelina)
- 2017 — "Daddy, forgive me" (Russian: «Папочка, прости», romanized: Papochka, prosti)
- 2017 — "Risa-chan" (Russian: «Риса-чан»)
- 2017 — "The Last Disco Party" (Russian: «Последняя дискотека», romanized: Poslednyaya diskoteka)
- 2018 — "There's Nothing I Want to Know Anymore" (Russian: «Не хочу ничего знать», romanized: Ne khochu nichego znat)
- 2018 — "At Dawn" (Russian: «На заре», romanized: Na zare) (Alyans cover)
- 2019 — "Fall into the Mud" (Russian: «Падать в грязь», romanized: Padat v gryaz)
- 2019 — "Burn Burn Burn" (Russian: «Гори гори гори», romanized: Gori gori gori)

=== Collaborations ===
- 2016 — Noize MC — "Childfree" (Russian: «Чайлдфри», romanized: Chayldfri)
- 2016 — Khan Zamai & Slava KPSS — Hype Train
- 2017 — Satana Pechyot Bliny (Russian: Сатана Печёт Блины) — "Selfie" (Russian: «Селфи», romanized: Selfi)
- 2018 — Satana Pechyot Bliny — "College Girl's Dream" (Russian: «Сон Студентки», romanized: Son Studentki)
- 2018 — Noize MC, Swanky Tunes — "People with Machine Guns" (Russian: «Люди с автоматами», romanized: Lyudi s avtomatami)
- 2018 — Kurtki Cobaina (Russian: Куртки Кобейна) — "DNA Threads" (Russian: «Нити ДНК», romanized: Niti DNK) (Bi-2 and Monetochka)

=== Videos ===
- 2017 — "Left for a Realist" (Russian: «Ушла к реалисту», romanized: Usha k realistu)
- 2017 — "Childfree" (Russian: «Чайлдфри», romanized: Chayldfri) (feat. Noize MC)
- 2017 — "Farewell, my Yekaterinburg!" (Russian: «Прощай, мой Екатеринбург!», romanized: Proshchay, moy Yekaterinburg)
- 2017 — "The Last Disco Party" (Russian: «Последняя дискотека», romanized: Poslednyaya diskoteka)
- 2018 — "Zaporozhets" (Russian: «Запорожец»)
- 2018 — "90s"
- 2018 — "DNA Threads" (Russian: «Нити ДНК», romanized: Niti DNK) (feat. Bi-2)
- 2019 — "Nympho" (Russian: «Нимфоманка», romanized: Nimfomanka)
- 2019 — "Fall into the Mud" (Russian: «Падать в грязь», romanized: Padat v gryaz)
- 2019 — "No Coins" (Russian: «Нет монет», romanized: Net monet)
