= Motorama (band) =

Russian rock band

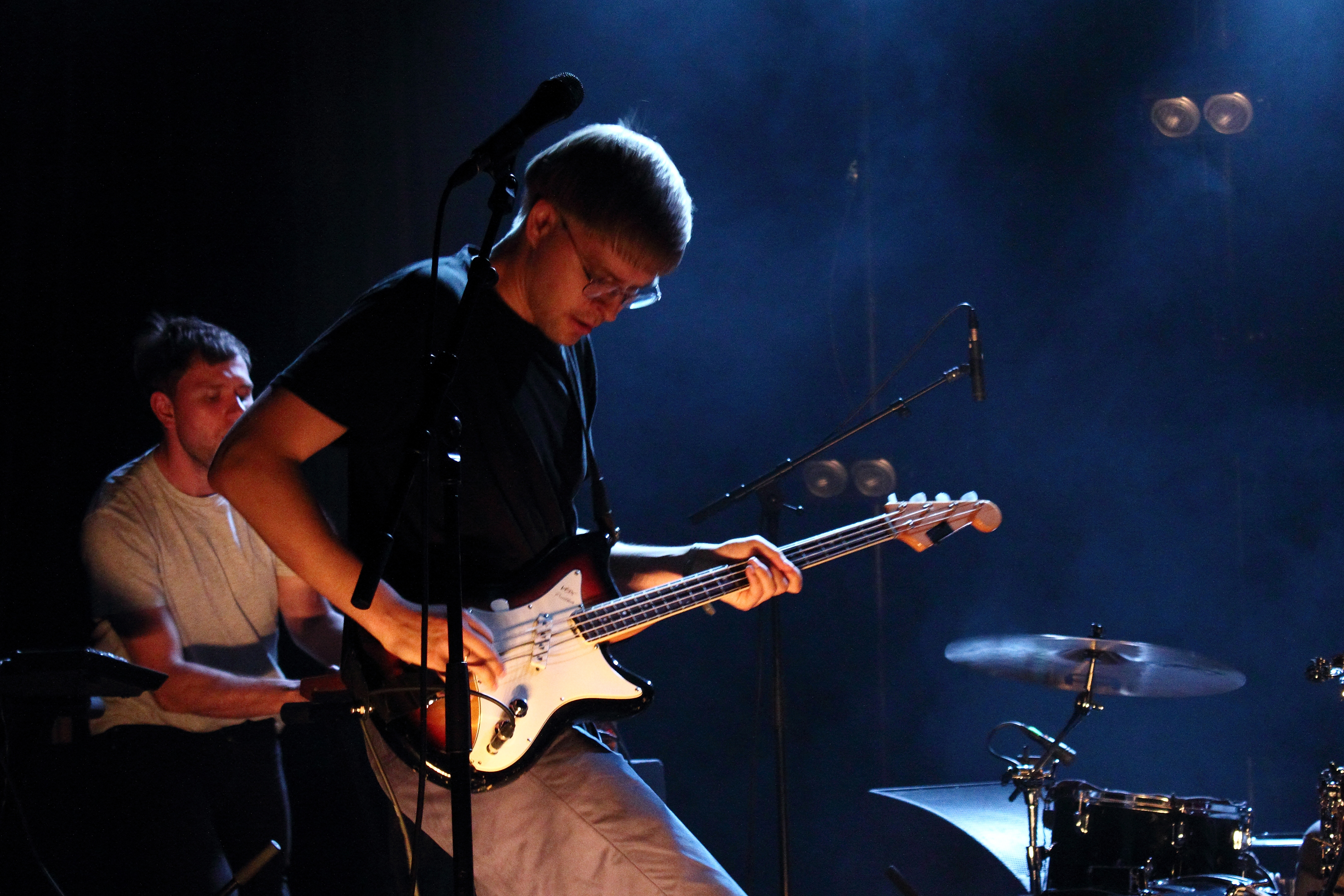

Background information
- Origin: Rostov-on-Don, Russia
- Genres: Post-punk, Indie rock, Indie pop
- Years active: 2005–present
- Label: I'm Home Records
- Members: Vladislav Parshin; Irina Parshina; Mikhail Nikulin (touring drummer)
- Past members: Vasily Yakovenko; Vadim Kvasov; Oleg Chernov; Maxim Polivanov; Evgeny Chervonny; Roman Belenky; Alexander Norets
- Website: wearemotorama.com

Motorama is a Russian post-punk band from Rostov-on-Don. The band was formed by Vladislav Parshin in 2005.

== Musical style and influences ==
The band performs songs in English. Vladislav Parshin’s musical interests are wide-ranging, spanning from Ennio Morricone’s western soundtracks and music from Soviet animated films to The Velvet Underground, Electrelane, Factory Records bands, and twee and Balearic pop in the vein of The Boat Club.

The vocals have often been compared with the voice of Ian Curtis, the frontman of the British band Joy Division. This, and the fact that Motorama played their first two mini-albums in a style close to the sound of classic post-punk, led to the fact that the group is often accused of copying Joy Division. Motorama’s singles demonstrate a more melodic and ghostly sound than Joy Division’s dark and fast paced punk.

These musicians also perform as the live lineup of Vladislav Parshin’s other project, Utro, a band in which he sings in Russian.

Vladislav Parshin and Irina Parshina formed another side-project, Leto v Gorode (Russian: Лето в городе, lit. 'Summer in the city'), in 2012.

== Discography ==
=== Albums ===
- Alps (2010)
- Calendar (2012)
- Poverty (2015)
- Dialogues (2016)
- Many Nights (2018)
- Before The Road (2021)
- Sleep, and I Will Sing (2023)

=== EPs ===
- Horse (2008)
- Bear (2009)

=== Singles ===
- Ghost (2009)
- One Moment (2011)
- Empty Bed (2011)
- Far Away From The City (2011)
- Winter At Night (2013)
- Eyes (2013)
- She Is There (2014)
- Special Day (2014)
- Heavy Wave (2015)
- Holy Day (2016)
- Mirror (2016)
- The New Era (2020)
- Today & Everyday (2020)
- Tomorrow (2022)
- Another Chance (2023)
- Caerus (2024)
