= Pompeya (band) =

Russian indie pop/rock band

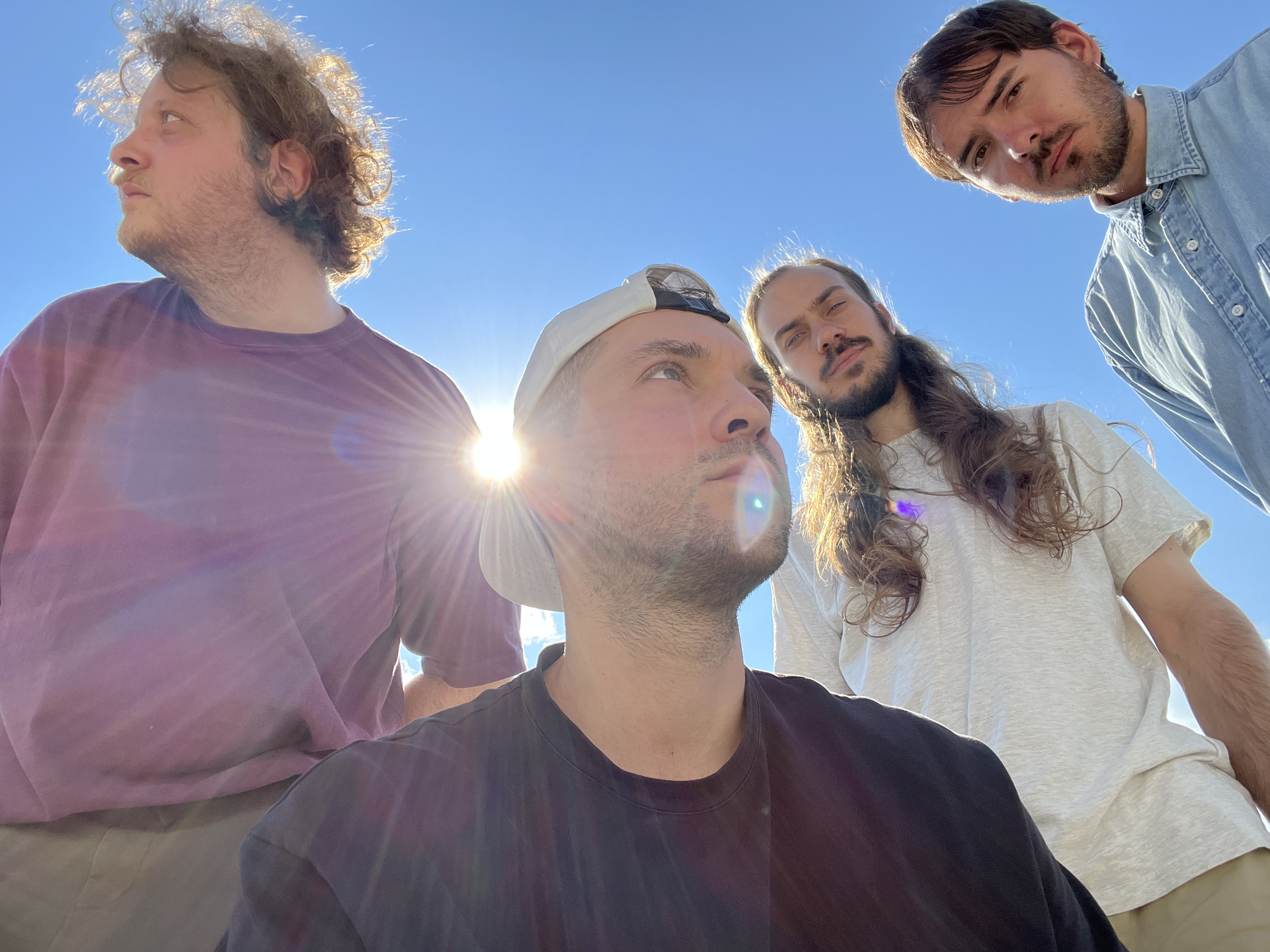

Background information
- Origin: Moscow, Russia
- Genres: Indie pop, indie rock, nu-disco
- Years active: 2006–present
- Label: Mishu Records
- Members: Daniil Brod; Denis Agafonov; Vlad Marushchak; Egor Bespalov
- Past members: Nairi Simonaian; Sasha Lipskiy; Dima Vinnikov

Pompeya is a four-piece indie pop and rock band based in Moscow, Russia. Their music is often described as bright and breezy, a mix of '70s disco, '80s new wave and '90s pop rock.

== History ==
The band formed in 2006 with members Daniil Brod, Denis Agafonov and Nairi Simonaian, and later, Sasha Lipsky. They self-released their debut EP Cheenese in Russia in 2010, followed by a full-length album Tropical in 2011. The band toured extensively in Eastern Europe.

Late in 2011, they recorded the 7 track EP Foursome at Bedrock Studios in Los Angeles, released in Russia in 2012. They played shows in the U.S. for the first time in 2012 at New York City clubs Mercury Lounge and Glasslands Gallery.

In 2013, their Tropical LP was re-released in the U.S. through Brooklyn label No Shame. The U.S. release of Tropical combined tracks from the original LP with the Foursome EP.

A Tropical remix album with tracks from producers Felix Da Housecat, Fred Falke and Jimmy Edgar was released in January 2014 through No Shame. This was followed by showcases at SXSW, a full U.S. tour, and the release of new singles from Pompeya's Night EP, which was fully released worldwide on 17 June.

== Discography ==
=== Albums ===
- 2011: Tropical
- 2013: Tropical (U.S. re-release)
- 2014: Tropical Remixed
- 2015: Real
- 2018: Dreamers
- 2020: Bingo
- 2025: Awesome

=== EPs ===
- 2010: Cheenese
- 2012: Foursome
- 2014: Night
- 2017: Domino
