= Mass media in Kazakhstan =

The mass media in Kazakhstan refers to mass media outlets based in Kazakhstan, a Central-Asian country that gained independence after the Dissolution of the Soviet Union, in 1991. The Constitution of Kazakhstan guarantees freedom of press, but privately owned and opposition media have been subject of censorship. In 2004 the International Federation of Journalists identified a "growing pattern" of intimidation of the media, and in 2012 several opposition media outlets were ordered to be shut down on charges of promoting "extremism".

All media must register with the Ministry of Culture, Information and Sports, with the exception of websites.

== History of mass media and freedom of the press ==
The media in Kazakhstan is "dominated by state-owned and pro-government outlets. Most major outlets are controlled by the government directly or indirectly," according to the BBC. Opposition newspapers and magazines were either closed or forced abroad, under threat of being fined. The most popular medium is television, with the government running the national networks. Kazakhs have access to Russian television stations through cable and satellite; on the internet, Russian social media are the most popular.

Reporters Without Borders noted in 2024 that "repressive reforms" have since 1997 seriously limited the freedom of the press in Kazakhstan, and stated that "the media landscape is now essentially a propaganda outlet for the Kazakh regime". More restrictions followed in 2022, after the 2022 Kazakh unrest. According to Reporters Without Borders, "The government pays private media to disseminate its propaganda. The government controls the appointment of top editors at state-owned and state-controlled media. The Ministry of Information itself serves as a media regulator."

Kazakhstan was ranked 122nd out of 180 countries in Reporters Without Borders' Press Freedom Index for 2022; it ranked 155th for 2021. In 2023, it ranked 134rd, and in 2024 142nd.

== Newspapers and magazines ==
A wide range of publications, mostly supportive of the government, are available. The authorities operates newspaper in Kazakh, and a regular national Russian-language newspaper. There were 990 privately owned newspapers and 418 privately owned magazines. Those supportive of the opposition face harassment and lawsuits.

Newspapers and magazines include:

- Kazakhstanskaya Pravda (state-run, in Russian), considered the official organ of the Council of Ministers
- Sovety Kazakstana (state-run, in Russian), the publication of the parliament
- Yegemen Qazaqstan (state-run)
- Ekspress-K (private, in Russian)
- Zhas Alash (private, opposition)
- Liter (private, daily)
- Vremya (private, in Russian)
- Karavan (private, weekly)

=== Intimidation and government-ordered closures ===
The opposition publication Respublika ran into serious difficulty after November 2001, when owners of printing presses refused to print the publication after a failed attempt by a government representative to buy a controlling stake in Respublika. (One owner found a human skull placed on his doorstep.)

The paper evaded a mid-March 2002 court order to stop printing for three months by printing under other titles, such as Not That Respublika. A decapitated dog was hung from Respublika building with a screwdriver sticking into its side and a note reading "there will be no next time"; the dog's head was left outside Irina Petrushova's home. Three days later, the newspaper's offices were firebombed and burned to the ground. In July, Petrushova was given an eighteen-month jail sentence on tax charges, but served no time after a judge ruled that the case fell under an amnesty. (Petrushova eventually left the country for Russia, where she continued to publish via the Internet, living apart from her family for their safety. In recognition of her work, she was awarded a 2002 International Press Freedom Award by the Committee to Protect Journalists, a US-based NGO.)

In May 2005 the Kazakh Information Ministry ordered the paper to be closed, accusing it of inciting ethnic hatred by publishing an interview with a Russian politician who made derogatory remarks about ethnic Kazakhstanis. The paper's deputy editor Galina Dyrdina claimed the closure was politically motivated, and vowed to appeal. The paper continued to be published under a variety of titles.

In November 2012, before the anniversary of the Mangystau riots, Kazakh authorities raided and searched Respublika's office and again suspended its publication while a verdict on criminal charges was still pending. On 21 November, Prosecutors moved to ban Respublika including eight newspapers and 23 Internet sites under its umbrella, along with the Vzglyad newspaper and its Internet sites for "propagating extremism". Reporters Without Borders described this as a "pretext" and said it would be the end of pluralism in Kazakhstan. A month later, the ban was ordered.

==== A magazine and two other newspapers ====
Other media experienced difficulties during the November 2012 case against media sources in Kazakhstan; Altyn Tamyr, Tortinshi Bilik and DAT (with its website—dat.kz—inaccessible as of December 2012).

==== International reaction to assaults on journalists ====
In 2012 the International Press Institute called for the government to investigate an assault on Ularbek Baitailaq—a contributor to opposition media DAT and Tortinshi Bilik, and archivist of the Kazakh National Archive). The Committee to Protect Journalists called for investigations into the assault of both Maksim Kartashov and Baitailaq.

== Television ==
Qazaqstan is the State Television Channel of Kazakhstan. Other country-wide television stations are Khabar and Yel Arna.

Gakku TV and Toi Duman are music channels dedicated solely to only airing music produced in Kazakhstan.

There are 116 private channels, including Channel 31, KTK and Perviy Kanal Evraziya.

== Radio ==
The state-owned Kazakh Radio broadcasts in official and Russian languages. A wide number of private radio stations are also available including Europa Plus, (Russian Radio), Hit FM, Radio Azattyq and Radio Karavan.

== Media websites ==
The country had 5.4 million internet users in 2011—up from 2010. "Twitter, Facebook and YouTube audience share is less than 0.4%", according to BBC in 2012.

The censorship of online publications has become routine and arbitrary.

In 2003 the state telecom firm KazakhTelecom was ordered to block access to a dozen websites it said were 'extremist'. The pages either supported the opposition or provided neutral news coverage.

In July, 2009, the government passed amendments to laws on the Internet which some critics claimed unduly restrictive. The law made internet content subject to existing laws on expression, such as criminal libel. It also widened the scope of 'banned media content' to cover political matters, such as coverage of the election campaign.

A broadcasting bill implemented in December 2011 was aimed at improving the content of the national media, and to 'protect' it from external influence. According to the government, the bill would “eliminate low quality content that inflicts psychological or emotional damage on views.”

The country had 5.4 million internet users and 362,000 Facebook users as of December 31, 2011.

=== Former media websites ===
- Guljan

== Lawsuits with governmental plaintiffs and defendants from media ==
In November 2012, Google, Facebook, Twitter, and LiveJournal were cited in a lawsuit filed by Kazakh prosecutors seeking to shut down opposition media outlets. The prosecutors demanded the websites stop publishing material from Kazakh opposition sources.

The following month a court in Almaty ruled that a number of opposition media outlets, such as the television channels Stan TV and K+ and newspapers Vzglyad and Respublika, had to close due to their "extremist" views. These were the same outlets who reported on the Mangystau riots in 2011.

=== Punishment for defaming a news agency ===
Increasingly, censorship is imposed by means of civil legal action, such as defamation suits. On 13 June 2005 a court in Almaty ordered former Information Minister Altynbek Sarsenbaev (the opposition leader assassinated in January 2006) to pay 1 million tenge ($7,500) in damages for 'defaming' Khabar news agency. Sarsenbaev was also ordered to publicly retract comments he made in an interview with the opposition newspaper Respublika. He had alleged that Khabar was part of a monopolistic media holding controlled by Dariga Nazarbayev. The case is believed to be in response to his resignation after the 2004 elections. At the time he stated "The election was not fair, honest, or transparent; the authorities showed that from the beginning they didn't want honest elections.

== Media-related legal code ==
Media watchdog groups such as ARTICLE 19 have voiced their concern over the government's moves in the past few years to silence the opposition. Recent changes in media-related laws in Kazakhstan appear to target non-governmental media outlets. Criticism of government employees can lead to lawsuits, and news laws against "extremism" have been used to shut down opposition media sources.

According to opposition source Adil Soz the Kazakh legal code is stringent on defamation, allowing even for cases where the defamation is true. "One can seek compensation for true statements damaging his/her reputation – for example, a government official who is of accused of abuse of State funds, can claim compensation even if the statement damaging his/her reputation is true". This also means that an Internet service provider could attract liability "by unwittingly providing access to insulting or defamatory information published through the Internet".

== See also ==
- Kazpost
- List of newspapers in Kazakhstan
- TV Channel 16/12
- List of journalists killed in Europe#Kazakhstan
