= Kolga (disambiguation) =

Kolga may refer to:

Places in Estonia

- Kolga, small borough in Kuusalu Parish, Harju County
- Kolga, Hiiu County, village in Käina Parish, Hiiu County
- Kolga, Tartu County, village in Nõo Parish, Tartu County
- Kolga, Võru County, village in Rõuge Parish, Võru County
- Kolga Bay
- Kolga River
- Kolga Nature Reserve in Varbla Parish, Pärnu County

Other

- 191 Kolga, Main belt asteroid, named after Kólga

== See also ==
- Kolka (disambiguation)
- Kolgaküla
