= Kolka =

Kolka may refer to:

- Kolka parish, an administrative division in Latvia
  - Kolka, Latvia, a village in Kolka Parish
- Cape Kolka, where the Baltic Sea and Gulf of Riga meet
- Kolka Glacier, a glacier in North Ossetia, Russia, near Mount Kazbek
- Kolka-Karmadon rock ice slide, a partial collapse of the Kolka Glacier

== See also ==
- Kolga (disambiguation)
