= Shahar (newspaper) =

- Type: Weekly newspaper
- Editor: Galymbek Zhumatov
- Founded: 2007; 18 years ago
- Language: Kazakh
- Headquarters: Pavlodar

Shahar (English: "City") is a Kazakh language newspaper published from Kazakhstan, Pavlodar.

== See also ==
- Media of Kazakhstan
- List of newspapers in Kazakhstan
