= Jimara =

Jimara may refer to:

- Mount Jimara, or Dzhimara, a mountain in Russia and Georgia
- Jimara, Georgia, a village in the historical region of Khevi, Georgia
- Jimara (leafhopper), an insect genus in the tribe Dikraneurini
- Jimara (constituency), a constituency in the Gambia; see List of NAMs elected in the 2022 Gambian parliamentary election
