= Kolka–Karmadon rock ice slide =

2002 landslide in North Ossetia–Alania

2002 Kolka–Karmadon rock ice slide
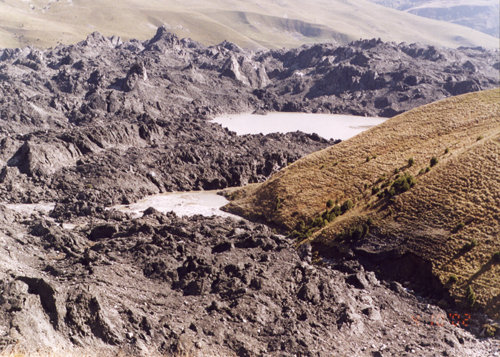
- Mass of ice and debris that buried the village of Karmadon and filled the surrounding basin
- Date: 22 September 2002
- Time: 16:08:35 (UTC)
- Location: Kolka Glacier and downstream basin; 42.73°N 44.4356°E
- Type: Glacier collapse resulting in Rock-ice avalanche
- Cause: Rockslide onto unstable glacier
- Deaths: 125+
- Property damage: 547 million ₽ (equivalent to $17.45 million / $31 million in 2023)

The Kolka–Karmadon rock-ice slide occurred on the northern slope of the Mount Kazbek massif in North Ossetia–Alania on the evening of 20 September 2002, following a nearly total collapse of the Kolka Glacier. It started on the north-northeast wall of Mount Jimara, 4,780 m (15,680 ft) above sea level, and seriously affected the valley of Genaldon and Karmadon. The resulting avalanche and mudflow killed more than 120 people, including a film crew of 27 people, among them Russian actor and director Sergei Bodrov Jr. While this type of avalanche is not uncommon, this particular event is considered extraordinary because of several aspects.

== Background ==
The Kolka glacier is known for its surges. Previously documented surges occurred in 1902 and 1969, with the 1902 event killing at least 32 people.

Before the slide the glacier was unstable due to either seismic (underground tremors), volcanic or meteorological (significant amount of snowfall in the previous years) factors or a combination of these, resulting in a large amount of subglacial water being present.

Immediately before the event mountaineers observed significant rockfall activity onto the glacier.

== Collapse ==
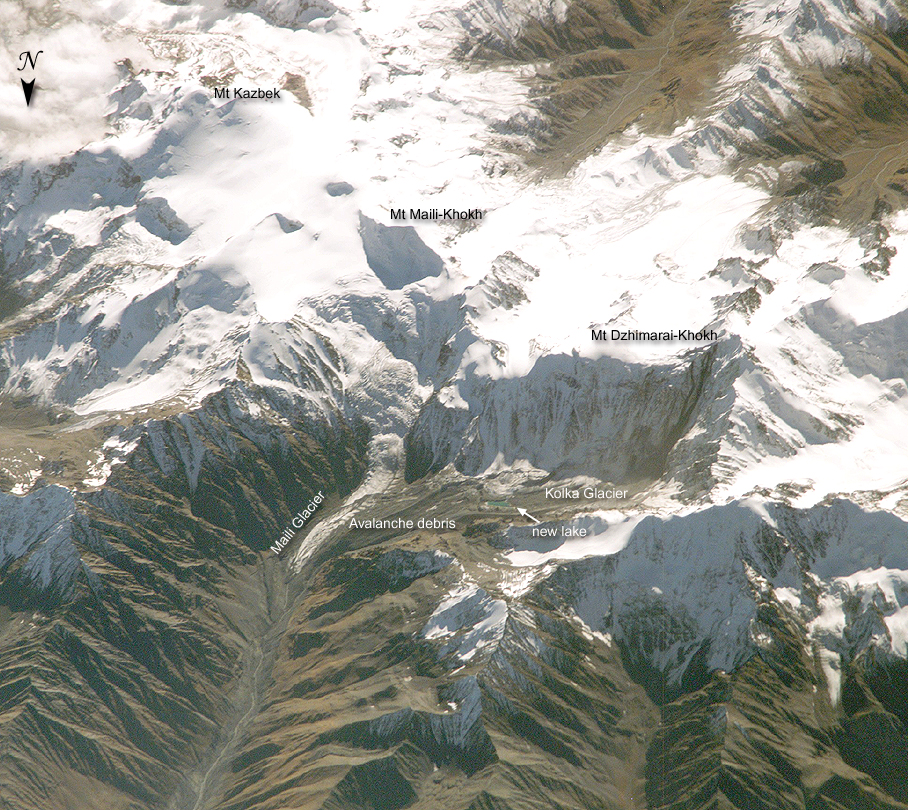
3D panorama of the affected region a month after the slide by NASA. The initial rockfall can be seen on the right.

The slide was started by an initial rockfall onto the glacier. This caused the glacier to be practically ejected from its basin resulting in its complete destruction and leaving behind an empty cirque, a phenomenon not previously observed anywhere else.

The loosened 150 m (490 ft) thick chunk of the Kolka Glacier traveled 32 km (20 mi) down the Karmadon Gorge and Koban Valley at over 100 km/h (62 mph). The outflow of mud and debris measured 200 m (660 ft) wide and 10 to 100 m (33 to 328 ft) thick. Even 10 km (6.2 mi) downstream the mass still surged 100 m (330 ft) up the narrow valley sides. (Note: The impacted vegetation was still visible on satellite imagery 20 years later.)

The main deposit had two distinct flows and finally settled at the Gates of Karmadon after covering a distance of 18 km (11 mi). The village Nizhniy Karmadon, along with several rest houses beside the river were obliterated.

== Aftermath ==
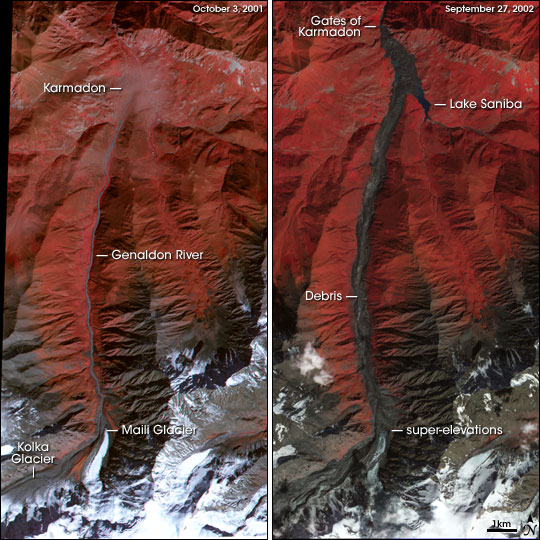
Satellite images, taken before and after the avalanche, show the vast extent of the disaster.

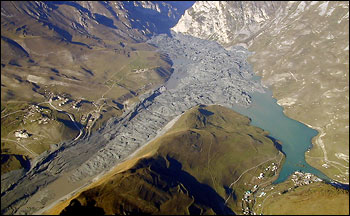
The outflow as seen from the air

Two villages along the gorge were under surveillance as flood waters backed up along the choked rivers. On September 25, a first round of explosives intended to break up the avalanche flow was unsuccessful in reducing flood waters lapping through the village of Gornaya Saniba.

The glacier reappeared two years later and started growing again.

== Notable victims ==
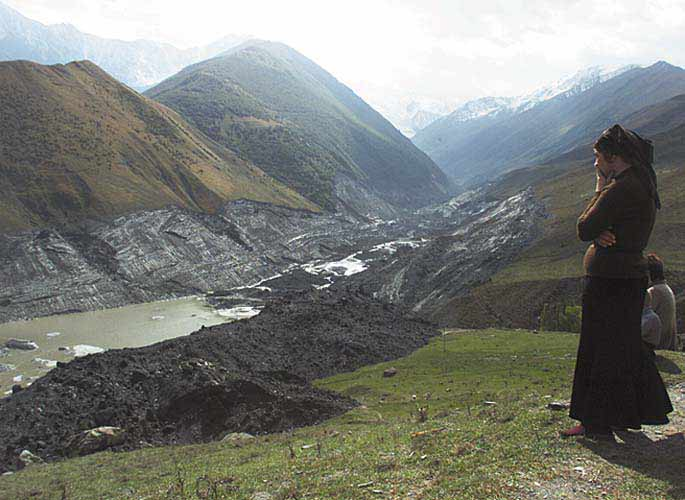
Residents looking down into the floodplain

- Sergei Bodrov Jr.
- Vladimir Kartashov
- Sergei Petniunas

== See also ==
- List of avalanches
- Glacier collapse
