= Kartashov =

Kartashov (masculine, Russian: Карташов) or Kartashova (feminine, Russian: Карташова) is a Russian surname. Notable people with the surname include:

- Alena Kartashova (born 1982), Russian wrestler
- Anatoly Kartashov (water polo) (1937–2005), Russian water polo player
- Anatoly Kartashov (cosmonaut) (1932–2005), Soviet cosmonaut
- Maksim Kartashov, Kazakh journalist
- Vladimir Kartashov (1957–2002), Russian artist
- Vyacheslav Kartashov (born 1966), Russian soccer player

== See also ==
- Anton Kartashev (1875–1960), Russian historian
