= Vladimir Kartashov =

Russian artist (1957–2002)

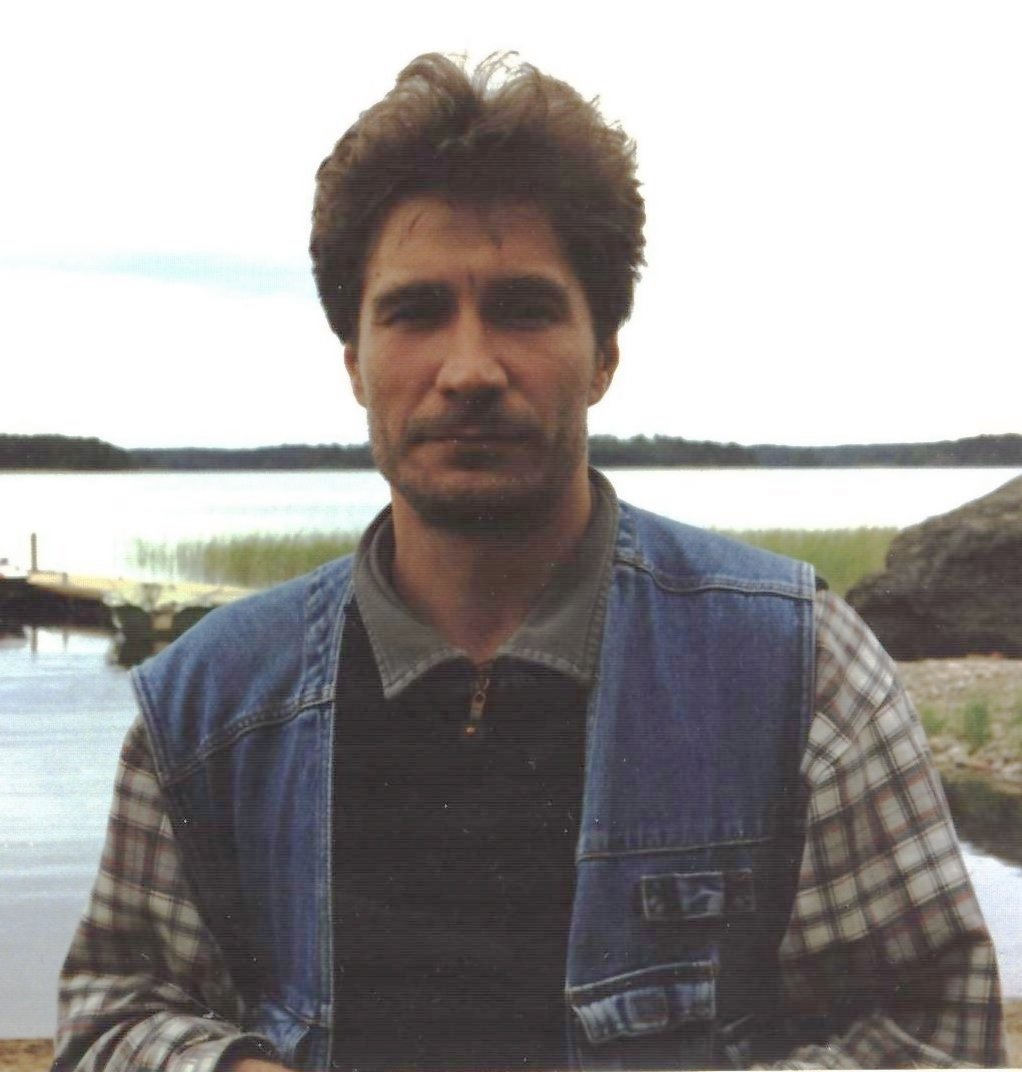

Vladimir Yurievich Kartashov (Russian: Владимир Юрьевич Карташов; 20 June 1957 – 20 September 2002) was a Russian artist and award-winning production designer. He was a twin brother of poet and artist Alexander Kartashov.

== Biography ==
Vladimir Kartashov was born on 20 June 1957 in Ivanovo, where his parents worked. In 1979 he graduated from the Tula Pedagogical Institute, Faculty of Chemistry and Biology. He worked as a school teacher, scenic designer in theatre. Until 1988 he lived in Tula, then moved to Leningrad.

He died on 20 September 2002 with the film crew of film Messenger (director Sergei Bodrov Jr.) in the collapse of the glacier "Kolka" in Karmadon Gorge of North Ossetia. Officially, he is considered missing.

== Creative work ==
In Tula, Kartashov supervised a group of artists called August. After moving to Leningrad, he became a member of the group Ostrov (literally the island). He had several personal and joint exhibitions with Alexander Kartashov in Tula, Moscow, St. Petersburg. His paintings are in private collections in Russia, Germany, the United Kingdom, Japan, and the United States.

Since 1992, Kartashov began working at Lenfilm after an invitation by Sergei Selyanov, then joined Selyanov's STW film company. He started work on a production of Fragments of Seraphim's Life (director Nikolai Makarov), which was never completed. His first job in film was Aleksei Balabanov's Zamok, an adaptation of Franz Kafka's The Castle. Kartashov won Nika Award for this work. Later, he once again collaborated with Balabanov on a set of cult movie Brat, and also worked with several arthouse and mainstream directors.

== Personal exhibitions ==
- 1987 — Tula
- 1988 — Wałbrzych
- 1988 — Tula
- 1989 — Polenovo (Tula oblast)
- 1991 — Moscow
- 1992 — St. Petersburg
- 1995 — Moscow
- 1995 — Tula
- 2006 — Tula
- 2007 — St. Petersburg

== Filmography ==
- 1994 — Zamok (directed by Aleksei Balabanov)
- 1997 — Brother (directed by Aleksei Balabanov)
- 1998 — Blokpost (directed by Aleksandr Rogozhkin)
- 1998 — Peculiarities of National Fishing (directed by Aleksandr Rogozhkin)
- 1999 — Boldinskaya Osyen' (short, directed by Aleksandr Rogozhkin)
- 2001 — Syostry (directed by Sergei Bodrov Jr.)
- 2002 — Gololyod (directed by Mikhail Brashinsky)
- 2003 — Carmen (directed by Aleksandr Khvan)

== Awards and nominations ==
- 1995 — Nika for best achievement in production design (for Zamok) - won
- 2003 — Golden Eagle for best achievement in production design (for Carmen) - posthumous, nominated

== Sources ==
- Vladimir Kartashov at IMDb
- Biography Artru.info (rus)
