= Lake Lohja =

Lake Lohja may refer to:

== Geography ==
- Lohjanjärvi, a lake in Finland
- Lake Lohja (Estonia), a lake in Estonia
