= 2018 arrest of WhatsApp group members =

Mass arrest in Kazakhstan

In 2018, the government of Kazakhstan made a mass arrest of nine Kazakh men who were members of a group chat for discussing Islam on the messaging app WhatsApp. Their arrest was determined to be in violation of international law by the Working Group on Arbitrary Detention. However, five of the men remain imprisoned, and the four that are no longer imprisoned still face restrictions. The five who remain imprisoned are: Beket Mynbasov, Samat Adilov, Nazim Abdrakhmanov, Ernar Samatov and Bolatbek Nurgaliyev.

== Background ==
Serious international concern has been given about the situation of human rights in Kazakhstan, in particular concerning freedom of religion and arbitrary detention. The founder of the WhatsApp Group, Bolatbek Nurgaliyev is a Salafi Muslim. He started the group, called "Ahli Sunnah Val Jamagat" on 2 December 2013. Between 2013 and 2018, the group grew to 171 members. Most of the messages in the group were sharing articles written by Islamic scholars. Kazakh authorities accused the group of encouraging terrorism, however an independent analysis by Adil Soz showed that messages on the server did not incite hatred or violence based on religion, nor the superiority of any religion. Nurgaliyev has said that he strongly opposes terrorist action.

== Legal proceedings ==
=== Arrest and trial ===
Nurgaliyev was arrested on October 27, 2018. Other members of the group were arrested October 27–28. Their trials ended on 5 August 2019, and the men were sentenced to prison time, ranging from 5–8 years. During the trial, "no evidence that any members of the group were ... advocating, encouraging or condoning acts of terrorism" was presented.

=== Imprisonment and further repression ===
There has been concern that some members of the group are being tortured and put in solitary confinement. Additionally, many of them have been forbidden from accessing the Koran, praying the namaz, or marking Eid al-Fitr while imprisoned, with disobeying prisoners given rotten food and threatened with extra jail time.

== International response ==
The United States Commission on International Religious Freedom recognized the men as religious prisoners of conscience.
