= Baksy =

Baksy may refer to:

- A 2008 film by Gulshat Omarova
- Slang for United States dollar
