= Alice Award =

Danish film award

- Awarded for: Best Female Director
- Country: Danish
- Presented by: Copenhagen festival

The Alice Award was a Danish film award presented annually at the Copenhagen International Film Festival to the Best Female Director. The award was named after Danish director Alice O'Fredericks (1899–1964) who, with 72 feature films, is the most productive film director in Danish cinematic history, and her 1950 film The Red Horses remains Denmark's greatest audience success.

The award was created by the international network of Women in Film and TV and presented at the Copenhagen festival for the first time in 2004. The intent of the award is to draw attention to the lack in the number of female directors in the industry, and to promote the diversity of viewpoint which women directors bring to the movies. The awards committee notes that in 2005 only 1 film out of the 31 Danish movies produced had a female director. The festival committee states that the award "can help to make talented female artists more visible in the international film environment and hopefully inspire other women."

The nominated films are judged by an independent panel of men and women from the Danish film industry and the cultural arts community.

== Award winners ==
Year	Film	Director	Country
2004	Schizo or Fifty-Fifty (Schiza)	Guka Omarova	Kazakhstan
2005	The Sleeping Child (L'enfant endormi)	Yasmine Kassari	Belgium
2006	Longing (film) (Sehnsucht)	Valeska Grisebach	Germany
2007	Sounds of Sand (Si le vent soulève les sables)	Marion Hänsel	Belgium; France
