= Freedom Is Paradise =

1989 film directed by Sergei Bodrov

Freedom is Paradise
- Directed by: Sergei Bodrov
- Written by: Sergei Bodrov
- Starring: Vladimir Kozyrev; Alexander Bureyev
- Cinematography: Yuri Skhirtladze
- Music by: Alexander Raskatov
- Production companies: Mosfilm, Creative Association "Rhythm"
- Release date: 1989
- Running time: 72 minutes
- Country: Soviet Union
- Language: Russian

Freedom Is Paradise (Russian: СЭР, acronym for Свобода Это Рай, Svoboda Eto Rai) is a 1989 Soviet Union film directed by Sergei Bodrov. It won the Grand Prix des Amériques, the main prize at the Montreal World Film Festival.

== Plot ==
The film follows 13-year-old Sascha, a half-orphan living in a reform school for troubled children in Alma-Ata, Kazakh SSR. Determined to find the father he has never met, Sascha repeatedly escapes from the institution, only to be caught and returned each time. During one of his attempts, he manages to travel as far as Arkhangelsk, where he locates the labor camp where his father is imprisoned. The camp commander allows Sascha to spend a single night with his father before he is sent back to the reform school the next morning.

The film's title, Freedom is Paradise, refers to the phrase "С.Э.Р." (an abbreviation of the Russian "Свобода — это рай") tattooed on Sascha's hand, a motto shared by many of the prison inmates.

== Cast ==
- Vladimir Kozyrev as Sasha Grigoryev
- Alexander Bureev as Father
- Svetlana Gaitan as Klava
- Vytautas Tomkus as Prison Camp Chief
- Valeria Prikhodchenko
- Sergei Bodrov Jr. as Juvenile Delinquent
- Igor Kosukhin (cameo)
- Sergey Shkalikov (cameo)
- Luiza Mosendz (cameo)

== Awards ==
1989 Montreal World Film Festival

- Grand Prix des Amériques

1990 Berlin International Film Festival

- Wolfgang Staudte Prize

1990 Nika Award

- Nominated for Best Sound (Vyacheslav Karasyov)

== Literature ==
- Adele Marie Barker: Consuming Russia. Popular Culture, Sex, and Society since Gorbachev. Duke University Press, 1999. ISBN 0822323133, p. 352.
- Anna M. Lawton: Kinoglasnost. Soviet Cinema in Our Time. CUP Archive, 1992. ISBN 0521388147, pp. 183–184.
