= A Yakuza's Daughter Never Cries =

2010 film directed by Sergei Bodrov

- Directed by: Sergei Bodrov; Gulshat Omarova
- Written by: Sergei Bodrov; Ganna Slutski; Yevgeny Frolov
- Produced by: Sergei Bodrov; Sergey Selyanov
- Starring: Vadim Dorofeev; Chika Arakawa; Tak Sakaguchi
- Cinematography: Sergey Trofimov
- Music by: Tuomas Kantelinen
- Production companies: CTB Film Company; Kinofabrika; Tengri Production
- Release date: 2010
- Running time: 81 minutes
- Country: Russia
- Language: Russian

A Yakuza's Daughter Never Cries (Russian: Дочь якудзы, romanized: Doch yakudzy) is a 2010 Russian comedy film directed by Sergei Bodrov and Gulshat Omarova. The film stars ten-year-old Japanese actress Chika Arakawa as Yuriko, the granddaughter of a powerful yakuza boss.

Filming initially took place in Japan, in the cities of Tokyo and Kyoto, and subsequently in Crimea, in the city of Kerch.

The film was presented on August 25, 2010, in Vladivostok at the "Pacific Meridian" film festival, serving as the festival's opening film. It was released in Russian cinemas on September 2, 2010; over the course of nearly two months in theatres, the film drew 70,762 viewers and grossed 11,192,396 roubles. It was released in Japanese cinemas on October 22, 2011.

Chika Arakawa received the Best Actress award at the 2011 Comedy Cluj International Film Festival.

== Plot ==
The film follows ten-year-old Yuriko, the granddaughter of a powerful Japanese yakuza boss. Due to a threat to her family's safety, she is sent to Italy. However, her plane makes an emergency landing in Russia because of bad weather. After being separated from her bodyguards while fleeing members of a rival yakuza group, Yuriko finds herself alone in an unfamiliar country. She meets Lyokha, a former car thief who has recently escaped from prison, and saves him. According to the Japanese concept of giri, Lyokha becomes bound to protect her. Together, they face threats from Japanese gangsters and Russian criminals.

== Cast ==
- Chika Arikawa as Yuriko Yamada
- Vadim Dorofeev as Lyokha Avdeev
- Sergei Garmash as Uncle Anton, colonel
- Irina Rozanova as Auntie Marfa
- Sergey Gazarov as Yakut
- Vitaly Khaev as Khokhol
- Irina Rakhmanova as Zinka, Lyokha's ex-fiancée
- Viktor Sukhorukov as Teacher
- Anna Mikhalkova as Bride
- Sergei Frolov as Bridegroom
- Artur Smolyaninov as Investigator
- Hirofumi Arai as Riki
- Yoshitaka Yamagami as Nakato
- Hideyuki Tsuchiya as Taji
- Tak Sakaguchi as Taku
- Takashi Asai as Asai, bodyguard Yuriko
- Naomasa Musaka as Yamada, Yuriko's grandfather
- Tetsuya Yoshida as Yamada's attorney
- Sakichi Sato as Police captain
- Akinori Ando as Young policeman
- Isao Karasawa as Killer
