= Respublika (Kazakh newspaper) =

- Type: weekly
- Founder: Irina Petrushova
- Founded: 2000
- Ceased publication: 2012
- Language: Russian
- Headquarters: Almaty
- Website: http://www.respublika-kaz.biz/

Respublika (Russian: Республика – деловое оброзение) or Golos Respubliki (Voice of the Republic) was a weekly Russian-language Kazakhstani newspaper. Founded by Irina Petrushova in 2000, the paper was known for its reporting on government corruption. It was ordered to shut down in 2002 and in May 2005 by the Ministry of Culture, Information and Sports, but continued to publish under a variety of titles. In late 2012, before the anniversary of the Mangystau riots, Kazakhstani authorities raided and searched Respublika's office and again suspended its publication, pending a verdict on criminal charges.

== History ==
Russian journalist Irina Petrushova founded Respublika in 2000. The weekly focused on covering business and economic issues in Kazakhstan, and frequently published stories highly critical of President Nursultan Nazarbayev's regime. The paper wrote about financial scandals and rampant nepotism and cronyism. Scandals the paper exposed included the granting of oil rights to one of Nazarbayev's relatives; the disappearance of funds for an airport in the capital, Almaty; and the Kazakhstani police forcing tourists off a plane so that Nazarbayev's daughter might fly alone. Respublika's most notable story was an exposé which revealed that Nazarbayev had stashed US$1 billion of the state's oil revenues in a Swiss bank account; the government stated that this had been an emergency fund used to rescue the national economy in 1998.

In November 2001, a government representative unsuccessfully attempted to buy a controlling stake in Respublika. In January 2002, Kazakhstani printers began to refuse to print the paper, one after a human skull was placed on his doorstep.

A mid-March 2002 court order to stop printing for three months was evaded by printing under other titles, such as Not That Respublika.

Petrushova bought a digital copier so that Respublika could do its own printing, but then the paper's offices became the target of intimidation and threats. On International Women's Day, a funeral wreath was mailed to Petrushova. On another occasion, a decapitated dog was hung from Respublika building with a screwdriver sticking into its side and a note reading "there will be no next time"; the dog's head was left outside Petrushova's home. Three days after the dog incident, the papers' offices were firebombed and burned to the ground. In July, Petrushova was given an eighteen-month jail sentence on tax charges, but served no time after a judge ruled that the case fell under an amnesty.

Petrushova eventually left the country for Russia, where she continued to publish via the Internet, living apart from her family for their safety. In recognition of her work, Petrushova was awarded a 2002 International Press Freedom Award by the Committee to Protect Journalists, a US-based NGO.

=== Closure on charges of extremism ===
In November 2012 Respublika was again ordered closed.

== See also ==
- Media in Kazakhstan
