= Prisoner of the Mountains =

- Theatrical release poster
- Directed by: Sergei Bodrov
- Screenplay by: Boris Giller; Arif Aliyev; Sergei Bodrov
- Story by: Boris Giller
- Produced by: Boris Giller
- Starring: Oleg Menshikov; Sergei Bodrov Jr.; Dzhemal Sikharulidze; Susanna Mekhralieva
- Cinematography: Pavel Lebeshev
- Edited by: Alan Baril; Olga Grinshpun; Vera Kruglova
- Music by: Leonid Desyatnikov
- Distributed by: Orion Classics
- Release date: 1996
- Running time: 98 minutes
- Countries: Russia; Kazakhstan
- Language: Russian

Prisoner of the Mountains (Russian: Кавказский пленник, romanized: Kavkazskiy plennik), also known as Prisoner of the Caucasus, is a 1996 Russian war drama film directed by Sergei Bodrov, based on the 1872 short story The Prisoner in the Caucasus by Leo Tolstoy. The film explores the clash between traditional Chechen culture and Russian military tactics during the First Chechen War, focusing on the personal struggle between two Russian soldiers and their Chechen captors.

The film received critical acclaim, winning a Crystal Globe at the 1996 Karlovy Vary International Film Festival. It was also nominated for an Academy Award for Best Foreign Language Film and a Golden Globe Award for Best Foreign Language Film.

Bodrov suggested to The New York Times that the film played a role in initiating peace talks between Russia and its neighbors, as it was screened to President Boris Yeltsin on a Sunday and discussions began the next day.

== Plot ==
During the First Chechen War, young Ivan Zhilin (played by Bodrov's son Sergei Bodrov Jr.) is conscripted into military service and finds himself in the mountains of Chechnya alongside battle-hardened Sergeant Sasha and another soldier. Their armored vehicle is attacked by Chechen fighters, resulting in Ivan and Sasha being taken captured and taken to a mountain aul, where they are imprisoned in a stable by village chief Abdul Murat. Abdul seeks to exchange them for his son, a rebel held by the Russians, as previous ransom attempts had failed.

Initial exchange attempts fail due to Russian deception and corruption, prompting Abdul to instruct Ivan and Sasha to write letters to their mothers, urging negotiations for their release. Over the following ten days, Ivan and Sasha earn respect in the village by performing tasks and defusing landmines. Their relationship with their guard, Hasan, warms, as does Ivan's bond with Abdul's daughter, Dina, who secretly provides them with food.

Ivan's mother negotiates with Abdul for their release, successfully arranging an exchange, unbeknownst to Ivan and Sasha. They attempt to escape, resulting in the death of Hasan and a shepherd. Sasha is subsequently executed, leaving Ivan alone in captivity. As preparations for the exchange progress, Abdul's son escapes and is killed, leading Abdul to plan Ivan's execution. Dina secretly sets Ivan free, but he refuses to flee to protect her.

Abdul shoots at Ivan but deliberately misses, letting him go. As Ivan walks away from the village, he sees a squadron of Russian military helicopters flying by, presumably to attack the village. He futilely waves and shouts at them, telling them to stop. The film ends with Ivan narrating: he returns home with his mother, haunted by the events and unable to forget those involved.

== Cast ==
- Oleg Menshikov – Sasha
- Sergei Bodrov Jr. – Ivan (Vanya) Zhilin
- Dzhemal Sikharulidze – Abdul-Murat
- Susanna Mekhralieva – Dina
- Aleksandr Bureev – Hasan
- Valentina Fedotova – Ivan's mother
- Aleksei Zharkov – Maslov

== Production ==
The Prisoner in the Caucasus was originally a more pro-Russian story. Bodrov, in adapting the original narrative for the movie, sought to make it more universal and appealing to a broader audience. Bodrov was inspired by the story since childhood and aimed to add depth by focusing more on a second soldier, a character less emphasized in the original. Overall, Bodrov infused the film with irony and realism, enhancing its impact.

=== Filming ===
The film was shot in Dagestan and Kazakhstan, with specific filming locations including the village of Richa in the Agulsky District, the village of Maraga in the Tabasaran District, and the old part of Derbent city. A scene portraying mountain dwellers relaxing and preparing shish kebabs was filmed near the Khuchnin waterfall in the Tabasaran district.

The film features many shots of the vast mountainous landscape, suggesting that the mountains’ emptiness serves as a large prison for the captives Vanya and Sasha.

== Reception ==
=== Critical response ===
Prisoner of the Mountains has an approval rating of 88% on review aggregator website Rotten Tomatoes, based on 25 reviews, and an average rating of 7.90/10.

=== Awards and nominations ===
Awards:

- European Film Award – Outstanding Single Achievement
- Karlovy Vary International Film Festival – Award of Ecumenical Jury
- Karlovy Vary International Film Festival – Crystal Globe
- Nika Awards – Best Actor (shared by Sergey Bodrov Jr. and Oleg Menshikov)
- Nika Awards – Best Director
- Nika Awards – Best Film
- Nika Awards – Best Screenplay

Nominations:

- Academy Award – Best Foreign Language Film (Russia)
- Golden Globe Award – Best Foreign Language Film (Russia)
- Nika Awards – Best Cinematographer
- Nika Awards – Best Sound Editing
- Satellite Awards – Best Motion Picture (Foreign Language)

== See also ==
- List of submissions to the 69th Academy Awards for Best Foreign Language Film
- List of Russian submissions for the Academy Award for Best Foreign Language Film

== Bibliography ==
- Grant, Bruce, ‘The Good Russian Prisoner: Naturalizing Violence in the Caucasus Mountains’, Cultural Anthropology, 20 (2005)
