= Guljan (site) =

Guljan.org (Russian: Гульжан) was a Kazakh news website. An opposition news source, it was owned by Gulzhan Yergaliyev. In July 2012, the website was reportedly subject to "massive hacking attacks over a week." It has since shut down.

== See also ==
- Media of Kazakhstan
