= Galymbek Zhumatov =

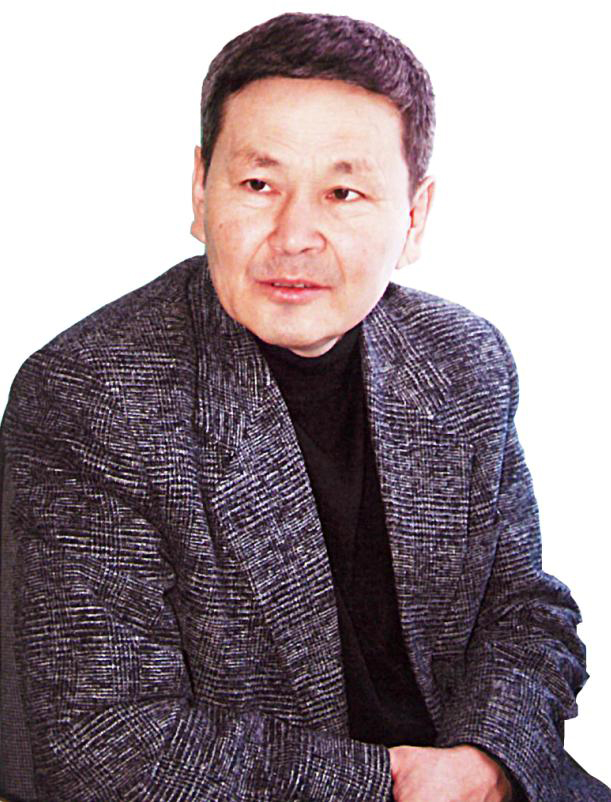
- Galymbek Zhumatov
- Born: 15 October 1952 Ulgili, Ertis District, Kazakhstan

Galymbek Zhumatov (Kazakh: Ǵalymbek Saǵymbaıuly Jumatov, Ғалымбек Сағымбайұлы Жұматов;) was born in Ulguli, Kazakhstan on 15 October 1952. He is a Kazakh writer, poet and member of the Union of Writers of Kazakhstan. He is also the founder of the newspaper Shahar.

== Life ==
Galymbek Zhumatov was born in the family of a veteran of the Second World War. His father Sagymbai Zhumatov participated in the Battle of Stalingrad and was seriously injured. After high school, he served in the Soviet Army. Service was held in Lviv. After serving in the Army, Zhumatov attended the Kazakh State University, Faculty of Journalism. After graduation, he began working in the regional newspaper "Kyzyl tu" (now Saryarka samaly), first as a correspondent, then as deputy editor. Between 1991 and 1995, he was the correspondent of the republican newspaper "Halyk kenesi." In 2007, Galymbek Zhumatov founded (Shaһar). It was the first commercial newspaper in the Pavlodar Region to be written in the state language. He now is the chief editor of the literary magazine "Nayzatas."

== Work ==
=== Writing style ===
Galymbek Zhumatov began his literary career as children's writer. His first book; "Трактор қалай жасалады?" ("How tractor built?") tells about the story of a boy who found himself on the Pavlodar tractor plant. This book was published in 1984. Two years later, he published a book "Ала көжек" ("The Motley Rabbit"), which brings the author fame. In addition to prose works Zhumatov writes poetry. In 2005 he released a collection of songs "Жеңіс жалауын желбіреткен" (Jeńis jalaýyn jelbiretken) about the collection of World War II veterans.

=== Works ===
- Traktor qalaı jasalady? (How tractor built?) (1984)
- Ala kójek (The Motley Rabbit) (1986)
- Jalǵas – jaýyngerdiń balasy (Jalǵas – son of war) (1992)
- Keń aýlaly úıdenbiz (Children of a large yard) (1992)
- Biz – 42 árippiz (We – 42 letters) (2003)
- Jeńis jalaýyn jelbiretken (Banner of Victory) (2005)
- Ana ósııeti (Memory of mother) (2006)
- Saǵynysh sazy (Melodies of longing) (2006)
- Kemeldi eldiń Kemeri (Kemer's Life) (2007)
- Máshhúr taǵlymy (Legacy of the Máshhúr Júsip) (2008)
- Sary beleń (Yellow time) (2008)
- Astanam ásem-asqaq án (Songs about Astana) (2008)
- Arnally aǵys (Life path) (2013)

=== Songs ===
- Jeńis joly (The path of victory) (2005)
- Maıdanger atalarǵa (Grandfathers-wars) (2005)

== Links ==
- Irtysh district library
