= Jimara, Georgia =

Jimara ჯიმარა
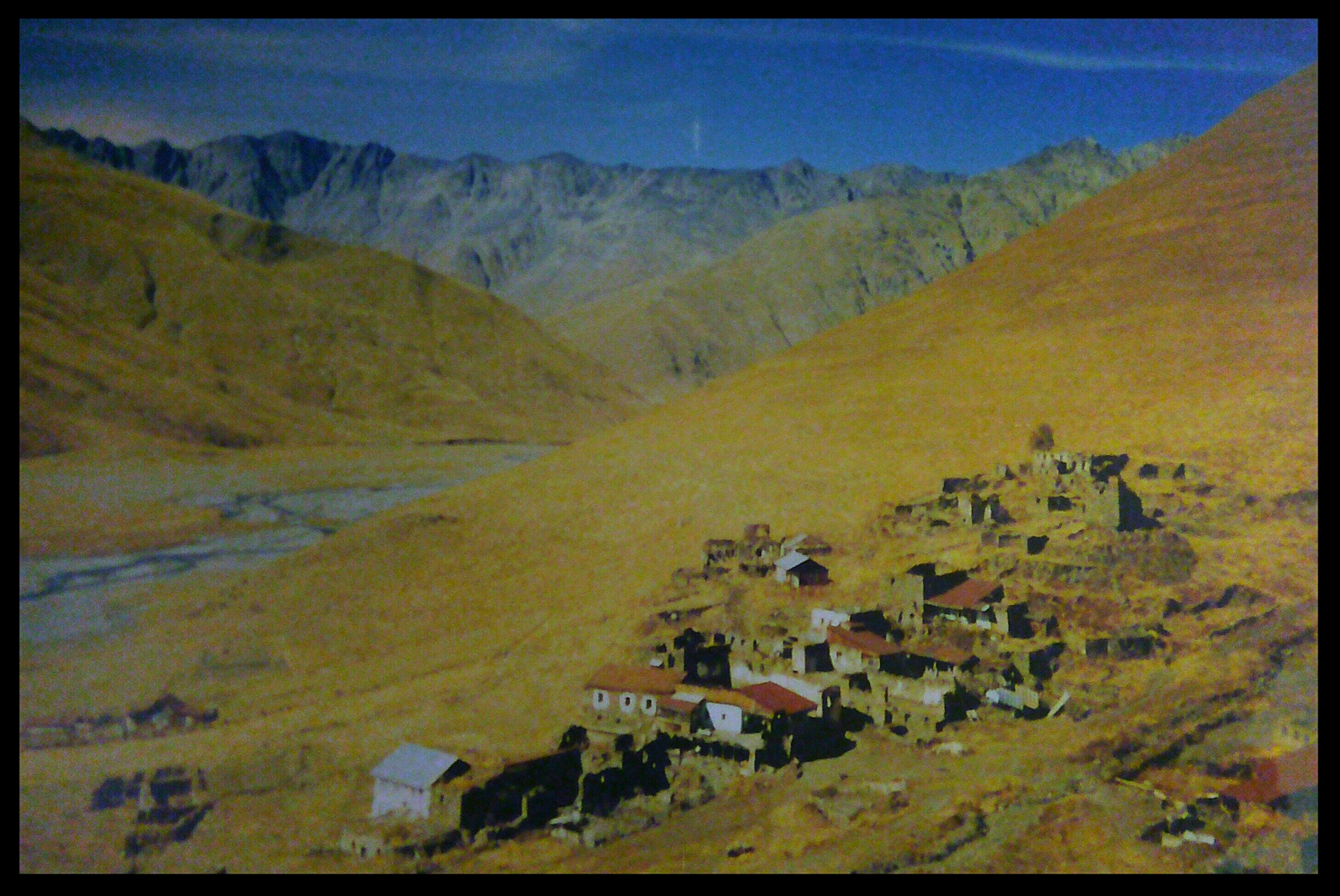
- Djimara

- Location within Georgia Location within Mtskheta-Mtianeti
- Coordinates: 42°38′18″N 44°19′56″E
- Country: Georgia
- Mkhare: Mtskheta-Mtianeti
- Municipality: Kazbegi
- Community: Kobi
- Elevation: 2,280 m (7,480 ft)

Population (2014)
  - Total: 0
- Time zone: UTC+04:00 (Georgia Time)

Jimara (Georgian: ჯიმარა) is a village in the historical region of Khevi, north-eastern Georgia. It is located on the confluence of the rivers Tergi and Djimaradoni, on the southern slopes of the Khokh Range. Administratively, it is part of the Kazbegi Municipality in Mtskheta-Mtianeti. Distance to the municipality center Stepantsminda is 42 km (26 mi).

== See also ==
- Mount Dzhimara

== Sources ==
- Georgian Soviet Encyclopedia, V. 11, p. 565, Tbilisi, 1987 year.
