= DAT (newspaper) =

DAT is a Kazakh newspaper. Along with Altyn Tamyr and Tortinshi Bilik, it is an opposition news source. The newspaper fell into difficulties during the November 2012 case against media sources in Kazakhstan; its website dat.kz as of December 2012 is inaccessible. Ularbek Baitailaq, an archivist of the Kazakh National Archive, has contributed articles to the resource.

== See also ==
- Media of Kazakhstan
