= Jas Alaş =

Almaty, Kazakhstan newspaper

- Native name: Жас Алаш
- Owner: Private
- Founded: 22 March 1921
- Language: Kazakh language
- Website: www.zhasalash.kz

Jas Alaş (Kazakh: Жас Алаш, lit. 'Young Alash') is a private opposition Kazakh language newspaper published in Almaty, Kazakhstan.

== History and profile ==
Jas Alaş was established on 22 March 1921. It is a nationalist newspaper named after Alaş movement. The paper is published in Kazakh twice per week, Thursday and Tuesday.

== See also ==
- Media of Kazakhstan
