= Gulshat Omarova =

Kazakhstani actor and director (born 1968)

- Born: Gulshat Diasovna Omarova; October 8, 1968 (age 57); Alma-Ata, Kazakh Soviet Socialist Republic
- Occupations: Actress, film director, screen writer
- Years active: 1984–present

Gulshat Diasovna Omarova (Kazakh: Гүльшад Диасқызы Өмарова, Gülşad Diasqyzy Ömarova; sometimes credited as Guka Omarova, born 8 October 1968) is a Kazakh film director, actress and screenwriter. She was born in Alma-Ata, Kazakh Soviet Socialist Republic and now lives in Rotterdam, Netherlands. In 2004, Omarova was presented the Alice Award for Best Female Director by the Copenhagen International Film Festival for her film, Shiza.

== Biography ==
Gulshat Omarova was born in Alma-Ata to a family of a journalist. Her father was the sports writer Dias Omarov and her mother worked in "Vechernyaya Alma-Ata". Her grandmother was the director of the High Mountain Ice Skating rink "Medeo" and her grandfather was a high official in the Kazakh Soviet Socialist Republic.

In 1984, when she was 14 years old girl, she started her career in the film called "Sladkiy sok vnutri travy" (Sweet juice in the grass), which was written and directed by Sergei Bodrov. After graduating from school at the Union of Cinematographers in Moscow, she met with Sergei Gerasimov, who was the Soviet film director, actor, screenwriter, playwright, teacher and professor. However, that year he was recruiting a group exclusively for children from Azerbaijan. He advised her to enter the next year.

In the same year, Sergei Bodrov, with difficulty knocked out a place for her through the State Film Agency. This year it was watched by Alexey Batalov's apprentice, but Batalov himself left for Baku. The apprentice really liked the will and aspiration of Gulshat, so they said that next year they could take her without exams. But she went back to Alma-Ata and entered the correspondence course in Journalism. After graduating from the Faculty of Journalism, she began working on television. She worked as an administrator, courier, auxiliary worker. Then she worked as an advertiser for "Philip Morris Kazakhstan".

Then Gulshat Omarova and Sergei Bodrov wrote the scenario for the film "Sisters", which was released in 2001. The first names of the film were “Belly dance”, then “Bandit's daughter”. Since the early 2000s, she lives with his son and husband in Netherlands, the city of Rotterdam. Sergei Bodrov in 2004 came out the picture Shiza, where Omarova presented her directorial debut, which was co-authored and co-produced by Bodrov.

In 2004 she was awarded the Alice Award for the film "Shiza" in the category "Best Female Director" at the Copenhagen International Film Festival and received an Oscar nomination for her 2007 film "Mongol".

== Education and career ==
From 1983 to 1986, Omarova, while still a schoolgirl, starred in the films "When You Are 12", "Sweet Juice Inside the Grass", "Non-Professionals", "Dina Nurpeisova". Then, she went to the Higher School of the Union of Cinematographers of Moscow and graduated.

After leaving school, in 1986–1988, she worked on television as an administrator and assistant director.

Then she entered the Faculty of Journalism at the Al-Farabi Kazakh National University and graduated in 1994. In her student years, she also combined work with study. Gulya worked on television as an assistant administrator, courier, and utility worker.

Then, she worked as an advertising specialist for "Tobacco" company.

She worked as a journalist on radio and television, took part in the filming of the films "Tick", "Podkop" (Kazakhfilm), and "Anomaly" (Kyrgyzfilm). From 1994 to 1997 she worked in the marketing department of "Philip Morris".

At the same time, she studied at the State Academy of Arts (namely, theater and cinema) with a degree in documentary film and television director. In 1998 she graduated from the academy.

== Filmography ==
Year	Film	Position	Notes
1984	Sladkiy sok vnutri travy	Actress	
1985	Non-Professionals	Actress	Kazakhfilm
1990	Klesh'	Actress	USSR
1991	Mama Rose	Actress	USSR
1992	Anomaly	Actress	Kyrgyzfilm
2001	Sisters aka Syostry	Story	
2004	Shiza aka Schizo or Fifty-Fifty	Director; Writer	Alice Award for Best Female Director
2007	Mongol aka The Rise to Power of Genghis Khan	2nd Unit Director; Casting Director	Film was nominated for Oscar for Best Foreign Film
2008	Baksy a.k.a. Native Dancer	Director; Writer	Kazakhstan, Russia
2010	A Yakuza's Daughter Never Cries	Director; Writer	
2016	Darkhan (Documentary)	Director	
