= Lake Lohja (Estonia) =

Lake in Estonia

- Lohja järv (Estonian)
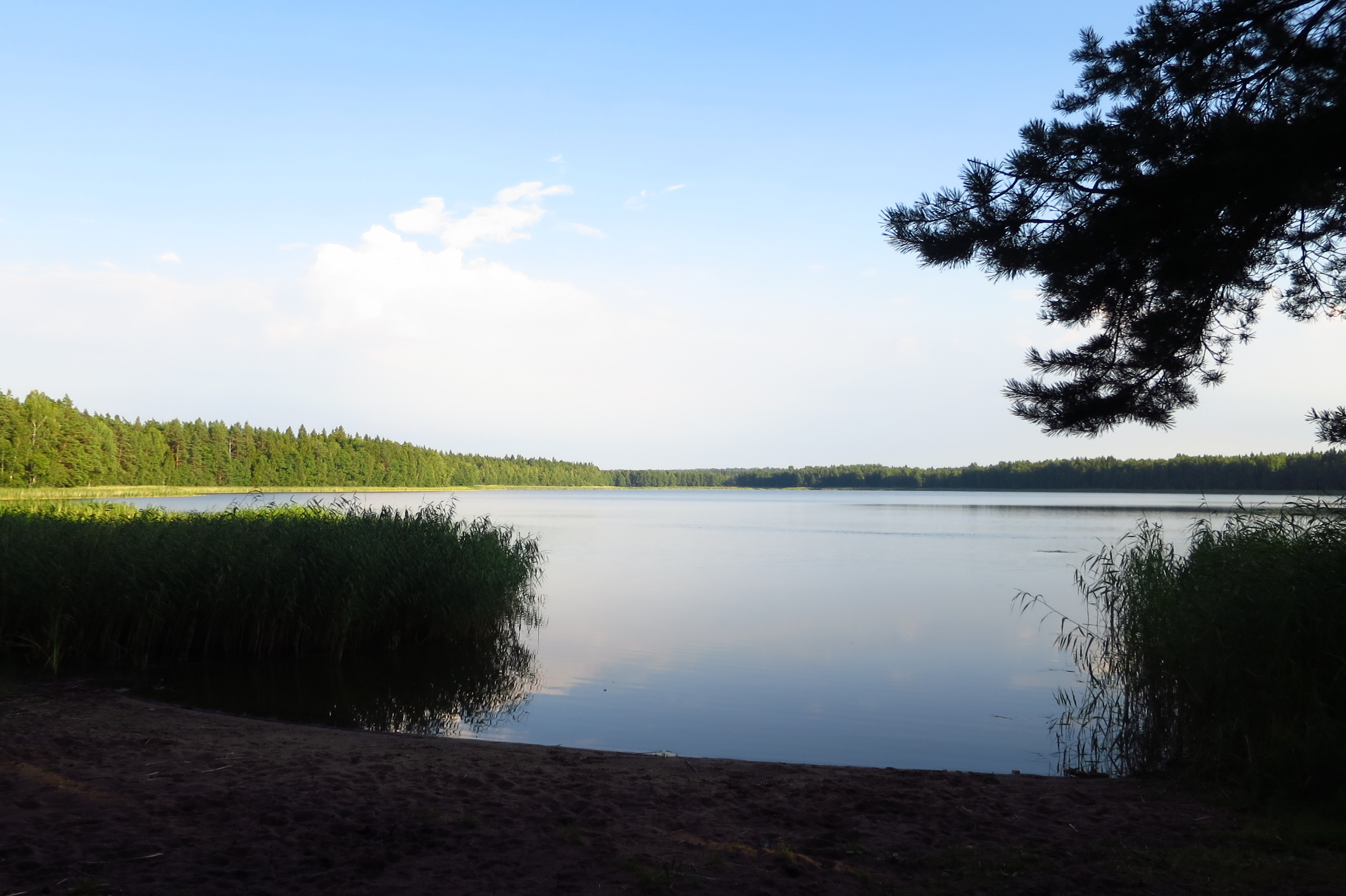

- Location within Estonia
- Coordinates: 59°32′50″N 25°41′30″E
- Basin countries: Estonia
- Max. length: 1,360 meters (4,460 ft)
- Surface area: 55.9 hectares (138 acres)
- Average depth: 2.1 meters (6 ft 11 in)
- Max. depth: 3.3 meters (11 ft)
- Water volume: 1,143,000 cubic meters (40,400,000 cu ft)
- Shore length^{1}: 3,460 meters (11,350 ft)
- Surface elevation: 5.4 meters (18 ft)
- ^{1} Shore length is not a well-defined measure.

Lake Lohja (Estonian: Lohja järv) is a lake in Estonia. It is mostly located in the village of Kolgaküla in Kuusalu Parish, Harju County, with a small part in neighboring Hara.

== Physical description ==
The lake has an area of 55.9 hectares (138 acres). The lake has an average depth of 2.1 meters (6 ft 11 in) and a maximum depth of 3.3 meters (11 ft). It is 1,360 meters (4,460 ft) long, and its shoreline measures 3,460 meters (11,350 ft). It has a volume of 1,143,000 cubic meters (40,400,000 cu ft).

== See also ==
- List of lakes of Estonia
