= Altyn Tamyr =

Altyn Tamyr is a Kazakh magazine. Along with DAT and Tortinshi Bilik, it is an opposition news source. Ularbek Baitailaq, an archivist of the Kazakh National Archive, has contributed articles to the resource.

== See also ==
- Mass media in Kazakhstan
