= Bear's Kiss =

- Directed by: Sergei Bodrov
- Written by: Sergei Bodrov; Carolyn Cavallero; Terrence Malick (uncredited)
- Starring: Rebecka Liljeberg; Sergei Bodrov Jr. Joachim Król
- Cinematography: Xavier Pérez Grobet
- Edited by: Mette Zeruneith
- Music by: Gia Kancheli
- Release date: 13 September 2002 (Italy)
- Running time: 101 minutes
- Countries: Germany; Sweden; Russia; Spain; France; Italy
- Languages: English; Italian; Spanish; Russian

Bear's Kiss is a 2002 dramatic fantasy romance film directed by Sergei Bodrov. It is based on an original script by Terrence Malick, who had previously attempted to fund the project multiple times. A German, Swedish, Russian, Spanish, French, and Italian co-production, the film was entered into the main competition at the 59th Venice International Film Festival.

The film has also been distributed under the titles Il bacio dell'orso (Italy), Le baiser de l'ours (France), Der Kuss des Bären (Germany), El beso del oso (Spain), and Медвежий поцелуй ("Medvezhiy potseluy") (Russia).

== Plot ==
A circus girl, Lola, raises a bear from cubhood. When she discovers that the bear, named Misha, can transform into a young man, a secret romance between the two ensues. Bodrov's son, Sergei Bodrov Jr., played Misha.

== Trivia ==
Swedish former actress Liljeberg stopped acting after her film Bear's Kiss and now works as a doctor after completing her residency at Södersjukhuset in Stockholm.

== Cast ==
- Rebecca Liljeberg as Lola
- Sergei Bodrov Jr. as Micha
- Joachim Król as Groppo
- Keith Allen as Lou
- Maurizio Donadoni as Marco
- Anne-Marie Pisani as Margarita
- Marcela Musso as Anna
- Ariadna Gil as Carmen
- Silvio Orlando as Ringmaster
