= Sisters (2001 film) =

2001 Russian film directed by Sergei Bodrov, Jr.

- Directed by: Sergei Bodrov Jr.
- Written by: Sergei Bodrov Jr. Sergei Bodrov; Gulshat Omarova
- Produced by: Sergei Selyanov
- Starring: Oksana Akinshina; Ekaterina Gorina; Roman Ageyev
- Cinematography: Valeri Martynov
- Edited by: Natalya Kucherenko
- Distributed by: Intercinema Art
- Release date: 10 May 2001
- Running time: 83 minutes
- Country: Russia
- Language: Russian

Sisters (Russian: Сёстры, translit. Syostry) is a 2001 Russian crime film directed by Sergei Bodrov Jr. It is notable as being his first and only film as director due to his death while filming his second film the year after. It was awarded Grand Prix for the Best Debut at the 2001 Kinotavr film festival.

== Plot ==
Sveta (Oksana Akinshina) and Dina (Ekaterina Gorina) are two half-sisters. Dina is spoiled and lives with her mother Natasha (Tatyana Kolganova) and father Alik (Roman Ageyev), who is a mid-ranking gangster, while Sveta lives with her grandma (Tatyana Tkach) in a more humble existence and wishes to be a sniper in the Russian Army.

Upon Alik's release from prison after doing some time for a robbery, some of his old associates demand him to pay them back some money he allegedly owes. When he refuses, they attempt to kidnap the two girls to try to intimidate him to give them the money. However they manage to escape, and go on the run from the mob through semi-rural Russia while their father attempts to sort affairs with the other gangsters.

== Cast ==
- Oksana Akinshina as Svetlana "Sveta" Malakhov
- Yekaterina Gorina as Dinara "Dina" Murtazaeva
- Roman Ageyevas as Albert "Alik" Murtazaev (dubbed by Mikhail Razumovski)
- Tatyana Kolganova as Natasha Murtazaeva
- Dmitry Orlov as Aleksandr Palych, ment
- Kirill Pirogov as a gangster who pursues the girls
- Aleksandr Bashirov as Seifullin
- Andrey Krasko as Misha
- Sergei Bodrov Jr. as Danila Bagrov

== Tagline ==
When you are eight years old, the whole world is against you. When you are thirteen years old, it's you against the whole world.

== Connections to the Brother films ==
Some believe that Sisters is the unofficial third entry in the Brother film series. Besides the title and the criminal themes, all three feature Sergei Bodrov Jr. onscreen: in Sisters he appears as a possibly mob-connected New Russian. In his last interview Bodrov confirmed that this was indeed a cameo of his Danila character from the Brother films, his way of "saying hello to Balabanov" rather than an attempt to continue the story.
