= Sergei Bodrov Jr. =

Russian actor (1971–2002)

- Сергей Бодров-младший
- Bodrov Jr. as Danila Bagrov in Brother 2
- Born: December 27, 1971; Moscow, Russian SFSR, Soviet Union
- Died: September 20, 2002 (aged 30); Karmadon Gorge, North Ossetia–Alania, Russia
- Years active: 1989–2002
- Spouse: Svetlana Mihailova (m. 1997)
- Children: 2, including Olga
- Father: Sergei Bodrov

Sergei Sergeyevich Bodrov (Russian: Сергей Сергеевич Бодров; December 27, 1971 – September 20, 2002), also known as Sergei Bodrov Jr., was a Russian actor and screenwriter who had lead roles in the films Brother, Prisoner of the Mountains, East/West and Brother 2. He was the son of the Russian playwright, actor, director and producer Sergei Bodrov. He died in the Kolka–Karmadon rock ice slide at the end of the second day of shooting of his film The Messenger.

== Early life ==
=== Childhood ===
Sergei Bodrov was born on December 27, 1971, in Moscow. His father is a film director, Sergei Bodrov, and his mother Valentina Nikolayevna was a fine art expert. His father was of mixed Russian, Tatar, and Buryat ancestry, while his mother had Belarusian roots. Sergei Bodrov Jr. believed that "childhood is the most important and the most amazing time in life." and what you'll become happens in the first sixteen years". Various publications report that Bodrov wanted to become a garbageman and drive an orange car.

Bodrov wrote about his early years and events which influenced his worldview in a "Composition on the Theme: Eight Events which Influenced Me, or How I Grew Up to Be a Good Person."

=== Education ===
Sergei Bodrov attended the special French-language School No. 1265. In December 2012, a memorial plaque was installed in the school in his memory.

Bodrov wanted to enroll in the Gerasimov Institute of Cinematography, but his father advised him that "cinema is a passion, and if you don't feel it you should either wait for it or forget about it forever." Instead, in 1989 he enrolled in the art history program in the history department of Moscow State University, graduating with honors in 1993. He remained at Moscow State University for postgraduate studies, although he already knew that he would not work in a museum or library. In his own words, at the university, he "learned to see beauty in the simple things around us".

After becoming an actor and television host he completed and defended his graduate thesis for his masters degree in 1998 entitled "Architecture in Venetian Renaissance Painting" and received the Candidate of Sciences degree. In 1991, while still a student, Bodrov studied art in Italy, where he found work as a lifeguard and earned money to support his travels around the country. When he was asked in an interview if his education was useful in his life, he answered: Of course. So you come to a city. What do you usually know about it? That there is a central square, some shops... And I know there is a painting in one of the museums and that you can spend the whole day in front of. And this day is added to your life.

== Career ==
=== Early roles ===
Sergei's first role as an actor was in Freedom is Paradise in 1989, directed by his father. He appeared on screen only for a few minutes, playing a minor lawbreaker who was waiting for a decision on his own fate while sitting next to the main hero of the film. During his university days, he also had a bit role as a bellhop in the 1992 movie White King, Red Queen.

=== Prisoner of the Mountains ===
In 1995, his father travelled to Dagestan for the filming of his movie Prisoner of the Mountains. Bodrov asked to go with him, prepared to do any available work. Unexpectedly, he became one of the featured actors, playing the conscript Vanya Zhilin, partnered with Oleg Menshikov who played the regular soldier Alexey Ryapolov. Bodrov received an award for best actor jointly with Menshikov at the Kinotavr cinema festival in Sochi.

Bodrov himself did not claim to be an actor: I always say everywhere: I'm not an actor, I'm not an actor, I'm not an actor. And I hear: "No, you're an actor". And I say that an actor is quite a different thing. Actors are different, it's a different temperament. A role for me is not a profession. It's something that you do.

=== Vzglyad ===
From October 1996 to August 1999, Bodrov was the host of the program Vzglyad on Channel One. He said that he left the show feeling it had given him a good schooling:I became acquainted with so many people, heard so many stories, read so many letters - it doesn't happen in other jobs. It had a very positive charge. Help two or three people and the telecast has done some good. But it has to be done responsibly.

In 1997 Sergei married Svetlana Mikhailova (author of the television projects "Wordsmiths" and "Canon"). In 1998 their daughter Olga was born, followed in 2002 by a son, Alexander.

=== Brother ===
During the 1996 Sochi film festival, Sergei Bodrov made the acquaintance of director Aleksei Balabanov, who invited him to the STW film studio. It was here that Brother was being filmed for release in 1997. Sergei played the starring role, Danila Bagrov. The movie was criticized by the media, accused of racism and Russophobia (as a film made for foreign audiences). Bodrov himself assessed his character in the following way: I know that Danila is often reproached for being primitive, simple and inarticulate. And in part, I agree with that. But a metaphor connected with him forms in my mind: I imagine people in a primitive chaos, who sit in their cave before the fire and do not understand anything else in their life except for the responsibility to eat and to reproduce. And suddenly one of them stands up and utters very simple words about how it is necessary to stand up for their friends, to respect women, to defend one's brother.

The music to the movie was composed by the Russian rock band Nautilus Pompilius, which Sergei himself enjoyed listening to.

It was through playing the lead role in Brother that "he became a matinee idol in 1997".

Despite some controversy, the movie received critical acclaim and won an award at the film festival in Sochi, a Special Jury Award and the FIPRESCI Award at the international festival in Turin, the same awards in Cottbus, and the Grand Prix in Trieste. Bodrov received the award for Best Actor at the movie festivals in Sochi and Chicago and got the "Golden Aries" prize.

The movie was regarded by many in Russia as culturally significant and for many of the younger generation, Bodrov's character Danila Bagrov became a hero and a role model.

=== Other roles ===
Over the course of 1998–1999, Sergei starred in two relatively minor films, the first was in Pavel Pavlikovsky's movie, a joint UK-Russia production, The Stringer, with British actress Anna Friel. Bodrov played Vadik Chernyshov, an impoverished 'stringer', who dreams of filming something to interest the western news channels. Friel played the role of Helen, a British media executive, as the two begin a romance against the backdrop of the world of journalism, and cultural differences, in the romantic thriller. The second was in Régis Wargnier's movie East/West, in which Sergei played Sasha, a neighbour of the central couple in the film, Dr Golovin and his French wife Marie, in a communal apartment during the Stalin era.

In 2000, the movie Brother 2 (Brat 2) was released, with Bodrov again playing Danila Bagrov. Critics attacked the movie as they had its predecessor, saying that it expressed racist ideas, threatened national security and insulted the Ukrainian and American nations. Bodrov responded: What was important for us was not to say that all Americans are jerks, but the opposite, that we are not freaks. This is a fairly simple idea, so it is strange that not everyone understands it. The Americans make movies about Russians where Schwarzenegger as a policeman tears off a mafioso's wooden leg and drugs fall out of it, and bears are walking in the streets. In other words, we [Russians] are complete lame-brains. So why don't we have the right make a joke at the expense of the Americans?

In 2001, Bodrov moved to California to take part in the shooting of his father's movie The Quickie. Sergei played Dima – the head of security for a rich American of Russian ancestry – Oleg (Mashkov). In Bodrov's free time during the filming of The Quickie, he wrote the screenplay for his first movie Sisters. His father suggested the idea of the movie to him and Bodrov Jr wrote the screenplay in two weeks; four days later filming began. The heart of the movie is a story of two sisters – Sveta (thirteen years old) and Dina (eight), who become inadvertent victims of their father's criminal past. Sergei played a small part, in a role without an available actor. The film opened on May 10, 2001. At a festival in Sochi, it received a Grand Prix award "for the best debut" and the young actresses received a jury award for their parts.

In the autumn of 2001, Bodrov became a host of the game show Last Hero. Sixteen people landed on an island near the coast of Panama and competed in various trials. The last participant to survive all the votes received the main prize of three million rubles. Bodrov conducted the game and provided the commentary. He gave his understanding of the telecast: I think that the subject of hunger and physical existence will emerge in front of them very seriously. But the true survival lies in how you're strong inside, how you can keep your humanity in inhuman conditions. And this is also related to me.

The shooting of Balabanov's movie War began in the spring of 2001. Bodrov had a role of short duration (he played captain Medvedev). The opening night was in 2002. The movie got the "Golden Rose" award at the Kinotavr festival and Bodrov received the Nika Award for the best supporting role.

Bear's Kiss directed by his father Sergei Bodrov opened on November 28, 2002. Bodrov played Misha, a bear who mystically transforms into a person. Sergei's love interest in the film is played by Rebecka Liljeberg.

=== The Messenger ===
In July 2002, Bodrov settled down to shoot his second film, with the working title The Messenger. He characterized the movie in the following words: "Philosophic-mystical parable about the life of two friends. They are romantics, travelers, and venturers. Of course, there will be bandits, hostages, in general, all that accompanies us in life. The movie is called 'The Messenger' and I'm like a coffee in a carton in it: the author of a screenplay, stage manager and performer of the leading role."

The film crew arrived in Vladikavkaz in September, and on September 20 were filming the scenes in a women's penal colony in Vladikavkaz where they intended to shoot the scenes of the main character's return from the army. At approximately 7 p.m., filming stopped due to poor lighting conditions. An ice slide then occurred, where a block of ice fell from Mount Jimara onto the Kolka Glacier, bringing with it mud and large boulders. This mudflow covered Karmadon Gorge, where the film crew were working. A massive search and rescue operation proved fruitless. 125 people were killed, including Bodrov.

== In popular culture ==
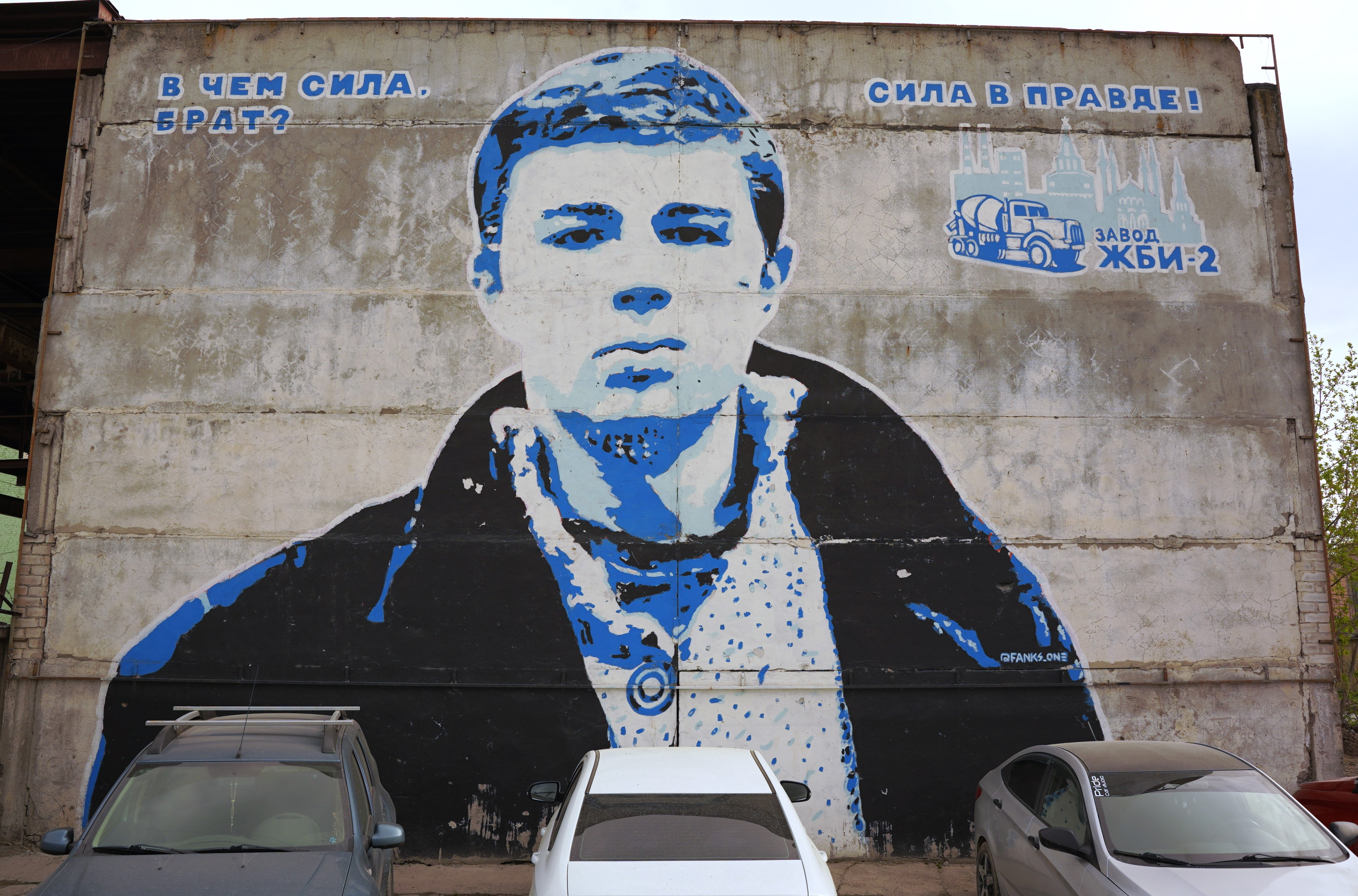
A Kazan mural of Bodrov's character in Brother

Reflecting Bodrov's stature as a cultural icon in Russia, there are several murals across the country, notably in Saint Petersburg, with Bodrov's image from the film Brother. There are also tours around Saint Petersburg to the filming locations of Brother.

== Filmography ==
Year	Name	Original name	Role
1986	I Hate You	Я тебя ненавижу	boy in the equestrian club
1989	Freedom is Paradise	СЭР (Свобода — это рай)	prisoner
1992	White King, Red Queen	Белый король, красная королева	postman
1996	Prisoner of the Mountains	Кавказский пленник	Ivan Zhilin
1997	Brother	Брат	Danila Bagrov
1998	The Stringer	Стрингер	Vadim
1999	East/West	Восток-Запад	Sasha Vasilyev
2000	Brother 2	Брат 2	Danila Bagrov
2001	The Quickie	Давай сделаем это по-быстрому	Dima
2001	Sisters	Сёстры	Danila Bagrov
2002	War	Война	Captain Medvedev
2002	Bear's Kiss	Медвежий поцелуй	Misha
2008	Morphine	Морфий	author of the script
Cancelled	Messenger	Связной	garbage man Alexey Semyonov (undercover FSB agent)

== See also ==
- Darya Jurgens
- Viktor Sukhorukov
