= Tortinshi Bilik =

Tortinshi Bilik (Kazakh: Төртінші Билік, Tórtinshi Bılik; literally: Fourth Estate) is a Kazakh newspaper. Along with DAT and the magazine Altyn Tamyr, it is an opposition news source.

== See also ==
- Media of Kazakhstan
