= Kolga Nature Reserve =

Protected area in Estonia

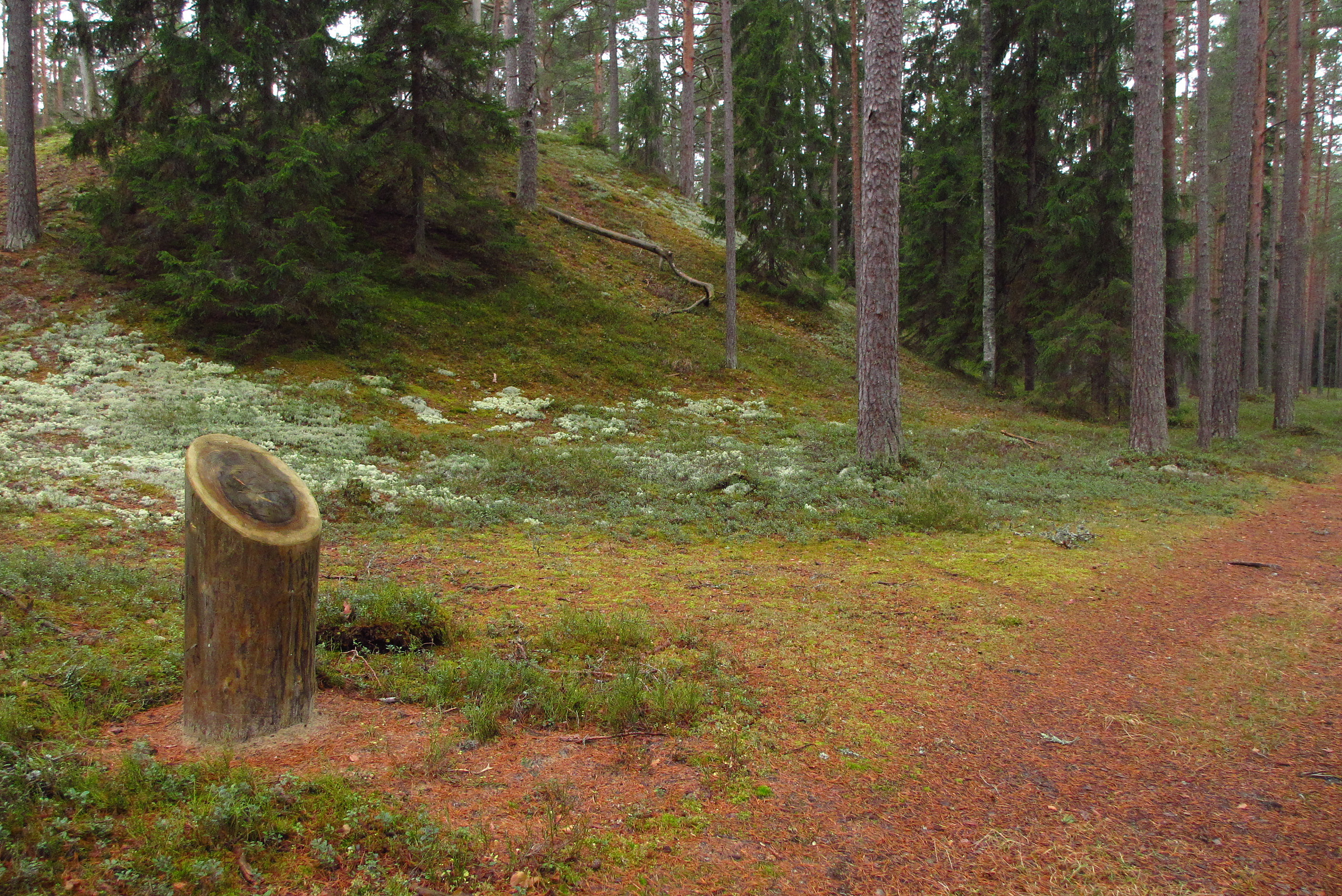

- Location within Estonia
- Location: Estonia
- Nearest city: Pärnu
- Coordinates: 58°23′09″N 23°50′03″E
- Area: 274 ha (680 acres)
- Established: 1991

Kolga Nature Reserve is a nature reserve situated in south-western Estonia, in Pärnu County.

Kolga Nature Reserve protects a number of sand dunes, overgrown with forests. The sand dunes were formed from sediments from the Baltic Ice Lake and Ancylus Lake, i.e. after the last ice age. Species in the nature reserve includes white-tailed eagle, eagle owl and pygmy owl. The flora includes several species of orchid.
