= Kolga, Võru County =

Village in Estonia

Kolga
- Village
- Location in Estonia
- Coordinates: 57°45′52″N 26°54′37″E
- Country: Estonia
- County: Võru County
- Municipality: Rõuge Parish

Kolga is a village in Rõuge Parish, Võru County in southeastern Estonia.
