= TV Channel 16/12 =

Information channel 16/12
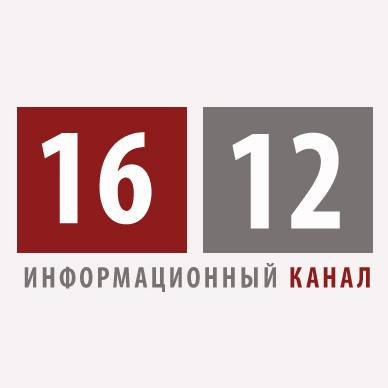
- Country: Kazakhstan
- Broadcast area: Worldwide; Internet

Programming
- Languages: Russian, Kazakh
- Picture format: 16:9, HDTV 720p

History
- Launched: 27 June 2013

Links
- Website: https://www.youtube.com/1612TV

TV channel 16/12 — is the only independent news TV channel in Kazakhstan.

== Persecution of the Channel ==
The Kazakhstan's authorities have repeatedly tried to stop the broadcasting of Channel 16/12. The Channel's employees were intimidated, arrested, their offices were searched and the equipment needed for their work seized. Specifically, in 2014, officers of the National Security Committee of Kazakhstan, along with law enforcement officers of Russia, burst into the office of the production company which was making videos for the TV Channel 16/12. They conducted a search, withdrew hard discs from the operating computers and took them away. Soon after that, a similar search was conducted in the Astana office of a company which was also making videos for the opposition channel. During the search, the equipment needed for their work was seized. Prior to this, Sanat Urnaliyev, journalist of TV Channel 16/12, and Viktor Gudz, the cameraman, were subjected to administrative arrest on a fake charge, along with a correspondent of Radio Azattyk, the Kazakh service of the Radio Liberty.

Other employees of the Channel were repeatedly subjected to administrative arrest on fake charges as well. For instance, Dmitri Schelokov was arrested for 15 days for appearing in front of the administrative Court building to support the arrested journalist Andrei Tsukanov. Prior to this, Dmitri Schelokov and Rinat Kibrayev had been arrested for 10 days for intending to take part in the meeting with Akim Akhmetzhan Yesimov arranged especially for Almaty bloggers. Apart from blocking the access for the journalists with no reasons offered, they were put behind the bars.

On 11 July 2014, the Almaty inter-district administrative court sentenced correspondent Andrei Tsukanov to 15 days of arrest for covering the protest action of flat letters against the arbitrariness of police officers. Tsukanov was detained when he was making video recording. During the arrest, the police officers beat Andrei and confiscated his press ID.
