= List of newspapers in Kazakhstan =

This is a list of newspapers in Kazakhstan.

== Newspapers ==
- Caravan — Russian language newspaper.
- Egemen Kazakhstan — Republic newspaper.
- Kazakhskaya Pravda — National newspaper of Kazakhstan.
- The Times of Central Asia — Independent newspaper covering Kazakhstan, Kyrgyzstan, Turkmenistan and Uzbekistan.
- Vremya — Russian language newspaper.
- Zonakz — Online newspaper Russian language.
- Vechernii Almaty — Daily official city newspaper in Almaty. Published in Russian language.
- Diapazon — Independent socio-political newspaper of Aktobe.
- Liter — Republican socio-political newspaper of Kazakhstan.
- Akmolinskaya Pravda — Social and political newspaper.
- Kursiv — Republican business weekly.
- Biznes and vlast — Business newspaper.
- Vechernyaya Astana — Socio-political, information newspaper.
- Delovoy Kazakhstan — Republican economic newspaper.
- Kapital — Business weekly.
- Novaya Gazeta. Kazakhstan — Russian language newspaper.
- Express-K — Republican socio-political newspaper.
- Kore Ilbo — Korean and Russian-language newspaper

== Magazines ==
- Forbes — Business magazine.
- Banki Kazakhstana — Financial magazine.
- Exclusive — Review and Analytical magazine.

== News agencies ==
- Ak Zhaik — News service English/Kazakh/Russian language .
- Khabar — State news agency.
- Tengrinews.kz — Information portal of Kazakhstan English/Kazakh/Russian languages.
- Kazakh TV — Kazakh TV news service, English/Kazakh/Russian languages.
- Bnews — News in Kazakhstan English/Kazakh/Russian languages.
- Kazinform — International news agency English/Kazakh/Russian languages.
- Astana Times — International news from Astana Times English/Kazakh/Russian languages.
- Interfax Kazakhstan — Information Agency Interfax Kazakhstan English/Kazakh/Russian languages.
- Qazaqstan — Kazakhstan state television channel English/Kazakh/Russian languages.
- Kazakhstan Today — Information portal of Kazakhstan English/Kazakh/Russian languages.
- Total — Information portal of Kazakhstan Kazakh/Russian languages.
- Aqparat — Information portal of Kazakhstan Kazakh/Russian languages.
- Zakon — Information portal of Kazakhstan Kazakh/Russian languages.
- 365info — Information portal of Kazakhstan Kazakh/Russian languages.
- Baq.KZ— Informational portal of Kazakhstan.
- Informburo — Kazakhstan news, Kazakh/Russian languages.
- NUR — Informational portal of Kazakhstan.
- LS — Information Agency of Kazakhstan.

== Other news sources ==
- Embassy of Kazakhstan to the US and Canada — up-to-date information on recent developments, as well as history, culture and traditions, of Kazakhstan; includes information about getting visas

== See also ==
- Media of Kazakhstan
