= Ularbek Baitailaq =

Kazakh archivist and journalist

Ularbek Baitailaq (Kazakh: Ұларбек Байтайлақ, Ūlarbek Baitailaq) is a Kazakh archivist and journalist. He is an employee of the Kazakh National Archive, and has contributed articles to the opposition papers DAT and Altyn Tamyr. In early August 2012 he was assaulted by four assailants and hospitalized.
