= Irina Petrushova =

Russian journalist, founder and editor-in-chief

- Born: 1965 (age 60–61) near Nizhny Novgorod
- Occupation: journalist
- Organization: Respublika
- Awards: CPJ International Press Freedom Award (2002)

Irina Albertovna Petrushova (Russian: Ирина Альбертовна Петрушова; born 1965) is a Russian journalist, founder and editor-in-chief of the weekly Respublika in Kazakhstan. After a series of stories exposing government corruption in Kazakhstan, her life was threatened and her paper firebombed. In 2002, she was awarded a CPJ International Press Freedom Award.

== Early life ==
Petrushova was born near Nizhny Novgorod in 1965. She is the daughter of Albert Petrushov, a reporter for the Russian Communist Party newspaper Pravda. Petrushov was known for his exposés of government corruption in Kazakhstan, including a story which ended the career of Kazakh Politburo member Dinmukhamed A. Kunayev.

In the early 1980s, Petrushova joined a journalism program at St. Petersburg State University that would allow her to work with her father. She later stated that traveling the country with him and seeing the impact that media attention could have on life in remote villages "made me positive that this is the thing I should do with my life."

Petrushova married a psychologist in 1984. The couple have two sons.

In 1992, Petrushova's father suffered serious brain damage when he was struck, apparently deliberately, by a car. His manuscript for a book on Kunayev was stolen while he was unconscious.

== Respublika ==
Founded in 2000, Petrushova's weekly Respublika focused on covering business and economic issues in Kazakhstan, and frequently published stories highly critical of president Nursultan Nazarbayev's regime. The paper wrote about financial scandals and rampant nepotism and cronyism. Scandals exposed the paper included the granting of oil rights to one of Nazarbayev's relatives; the disappearance of funds for an airport in the capital, Almaty; and the Kazakh police forcing tourists off a plane so that Nazarbayev's daughter might fly alone. Respublika's most notable story was an exposé which revealed that Nazarbayev had stashed US$1 billion of the state's oil revenues in a Swiss bank account; the government stated that this had been an emergency fund used to rescue the national economy in 1998.

In November 2001, a government representative unsuccessfully attempted to buy a controlling stake in Respublika. In January 2002, Kazakhstani printers began to refuse to print the paper, one after a human skull was placed on his doorstep. Respublika was also ordered by a Kazakhstani court to stop printing, but evaded the ban by printing under titles like Not That Respublika.

Petrushova bought a digital copier so that Respublika could do its own printing, but then the paper's offices became the target of intimidation and threats. On International Women's Day, a funeral wreath was mailed to Petrushova. On another occasion, a decapitated dog was hung from Respublika building with a screwdriver sticking into its side and a note reading "there will be no next time"; the dog's head was left outside Petrushova's home. Three days after the dog incident, the papers' offices were firebombed and burned to the ground. In July, Petrushova was given an eighteen-month jail sentence on tax charges, but served no time after a judge ruled that the case fell under an amnesty.

Petrushova eventually left the country for Russia, where she continued to publish via the Internet, living apart from her family for their safety. In recognition of her work, Petrushova was awarded a 2002 International Press Freedom Award by the Committee to Protect Journalists, a US-based NGO.

== In Russia ==
In Moscow, Petrushova edited the Assandi Times, a publication which has reported extensively on the United States Department of Justice investigation into allegations that president Nazarbayev and his allies had accepted US$78 million in bribes from American oil companies in 2000.

In April 2005 Petrushova was briefly detained in Volokolamsk near Moscow in Russia at the request of Kazakh authorities who sought her detention on charges of tax evasion and violating Kazakh citizenship laws. After Moscow prosecutors ruled that the statute of limitations had expired on the charges, Kazakhstan's request for her extradition was denied. Petrushova was released a few days later. She had also been detained on the same charges in St. Petersburg in 2004.
