= Stan TV =

Former Kazakhstan news outlet

Stan TV (Russian: Стан) was an Kazakh news outlet. In December 2012, the Bostandyk District Court in Almaty reportedly ordered Stan TV to halt news programming for alleged violation of "Kazakhstan's laws on extremism and national security".
