= Karmadon Gorge =

Gorge in the Caucasus, Russia

Karmadon gorge
- Genaldon gorge
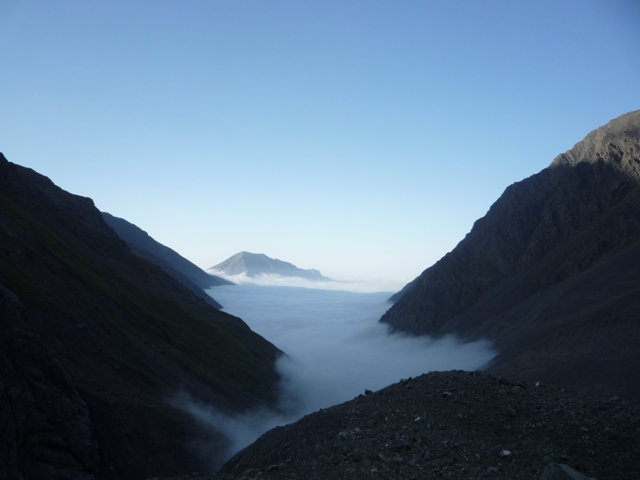
- Karmadon Gorge

Geography
- Country: Russia
- State: North Ossetia
- Coordinates: 42°51′23.18″N 44°31′25″E
- Interactive map of Karmadon gorge

Karmadon (Genaldon) gorge (Iron Ossetic: Гӕналгом) is a gorge in North Ossetia. The Genaldon river (Terek basin) of the Greater Caucasus mountain system flows in the gorge. In the upper reaches of the gorge there are two glaciers: Kolka and Mayli. It is located at altitudes from 750 m to 1200 m above sea level.

There are geothermal springs and mineral water outlets in the gorge and it serves as a place of rest for the residents of Vladikavkaz.

A popular climbing route to Mount Kazbek passes through the Karmadon gorge along the Mayli glacier.

== Collapse ==
On September 20, 2002, there was a rock ice slide of the Kolka glacier. A mass of snow, ice and stones moved along the gorge at a speed of over 180 km/h. As a result of the glacier's descent, the village of Verkhny Karmadon was completely destroyed, around 140 people died, including the film crew of the film "The Messenger", led by Sergei Bodrov Jr.

== Gallery ==
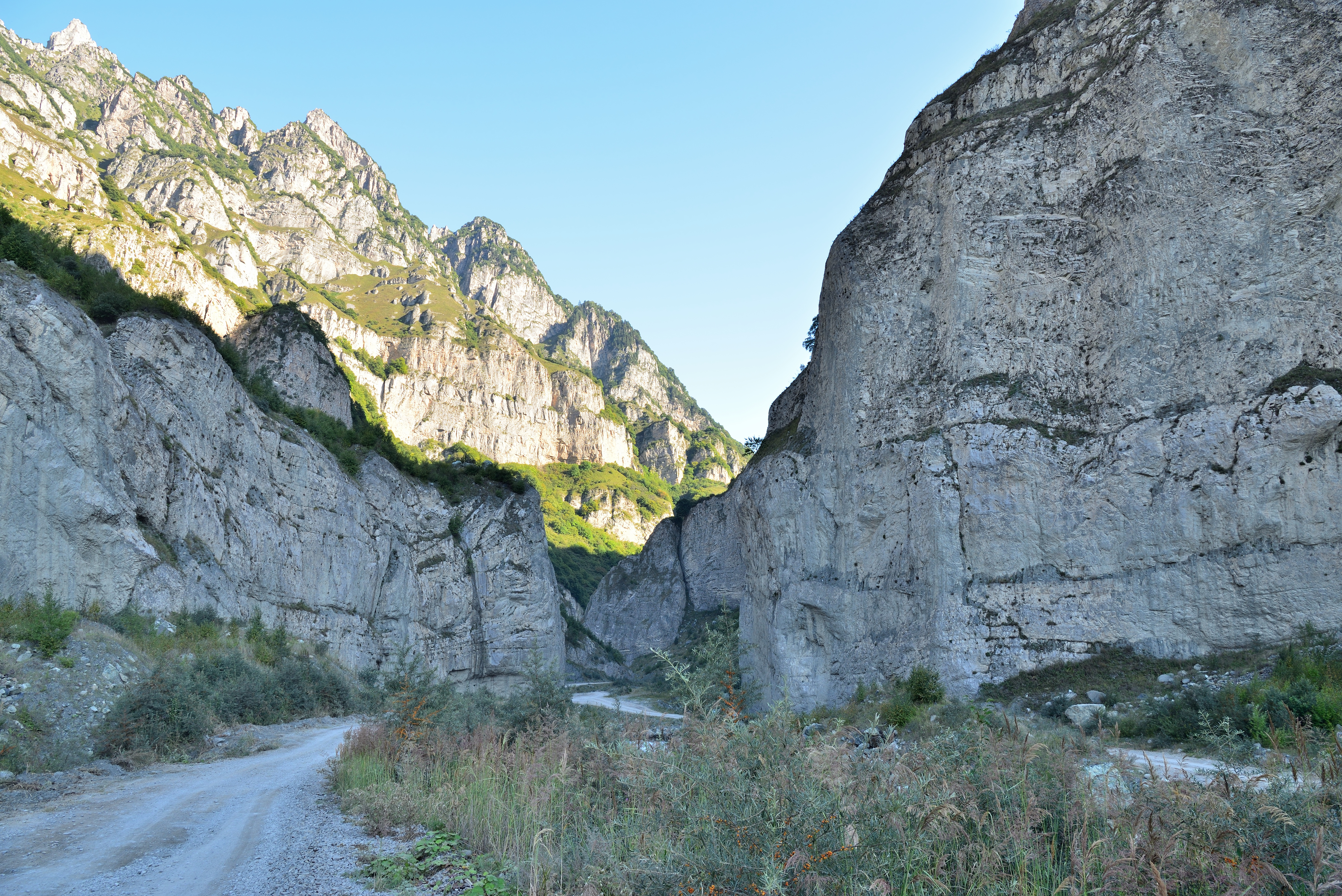
The narrowing of the walls of the gorge

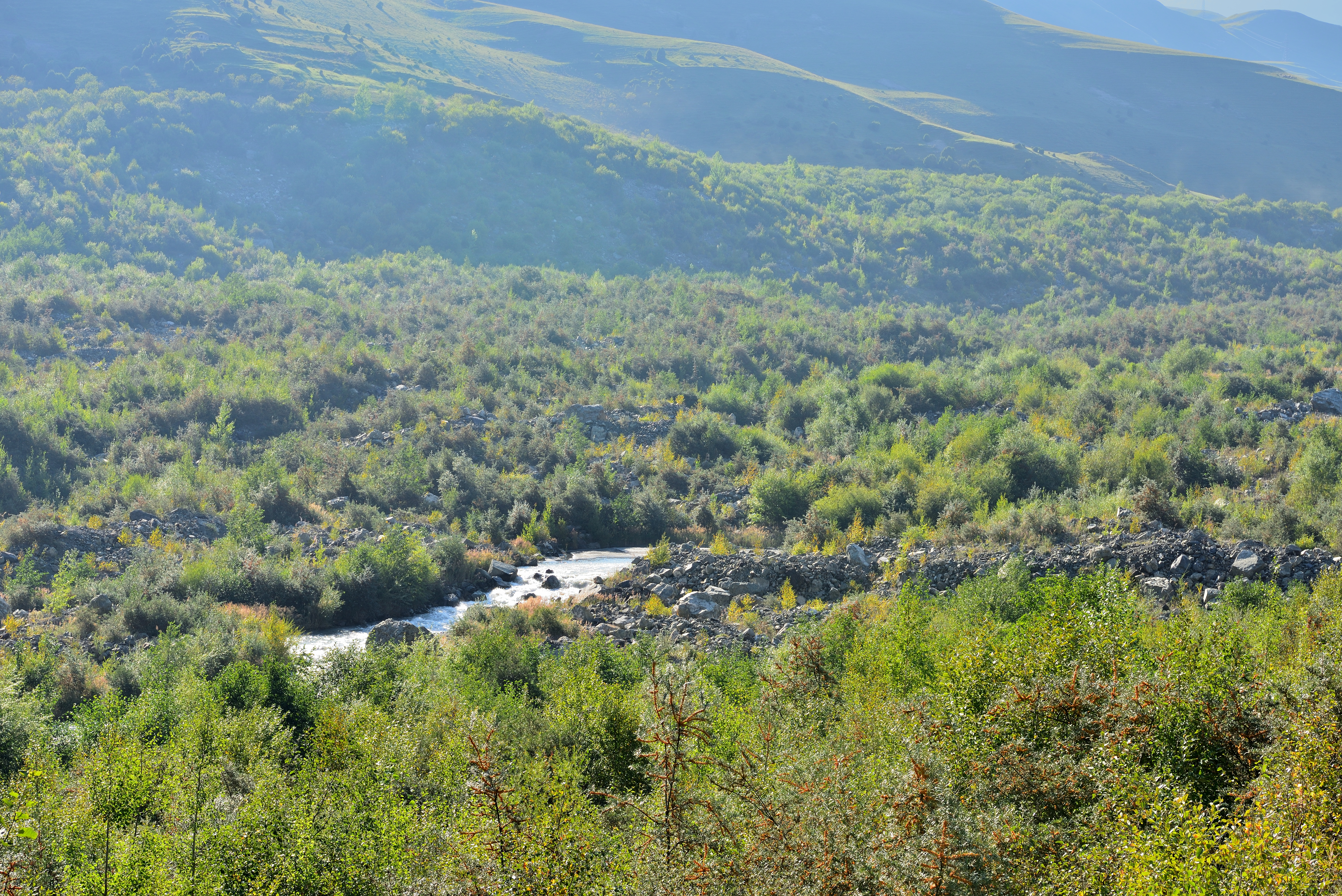
A section of the gorge covered with stones after the collapse of the Kolka glacier

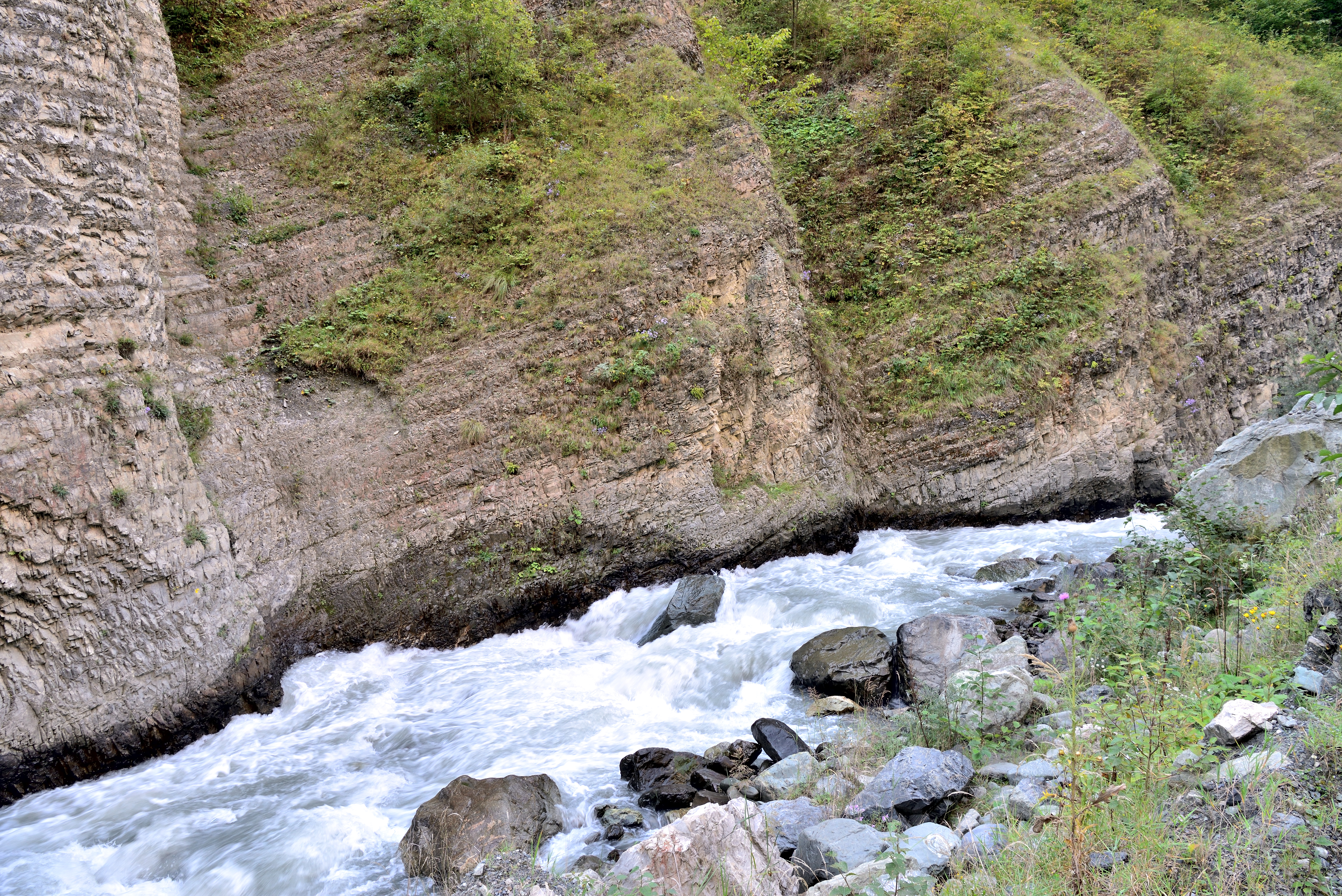
Traces of the glacier on the walls of the gorge

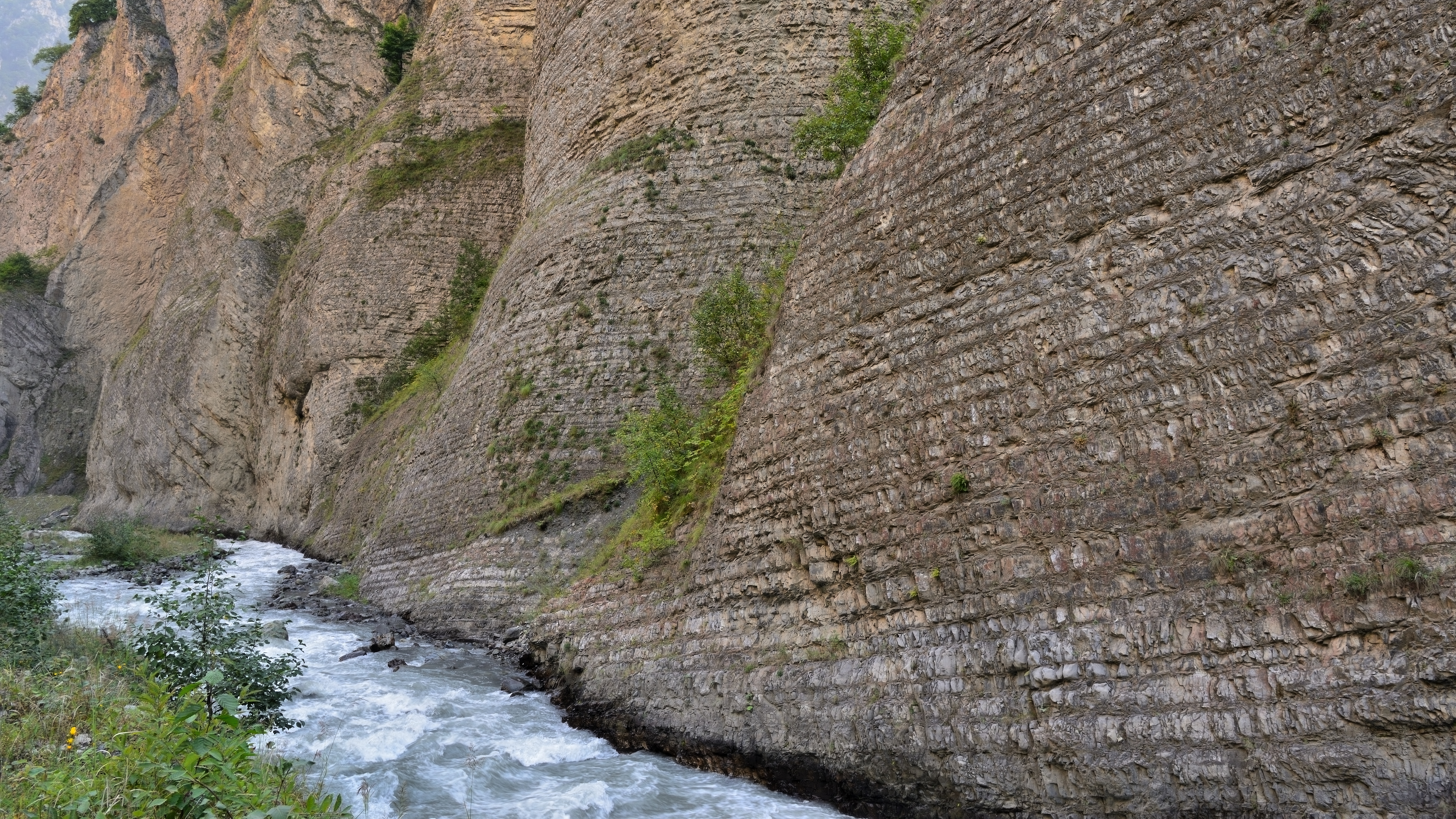
The walls of the gorge after the descent of the glacier

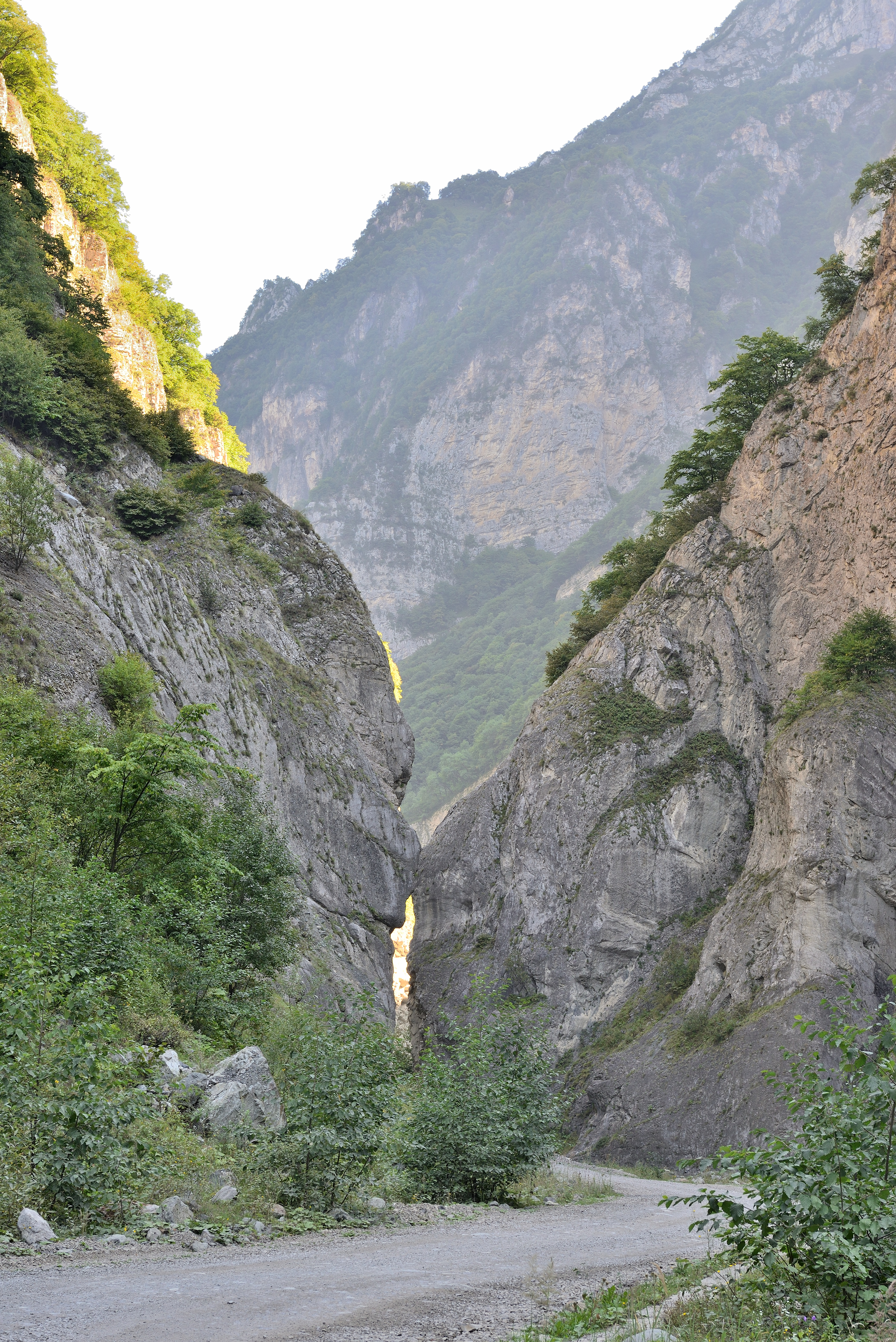
The narrowing of the walls of the gorge - the neck

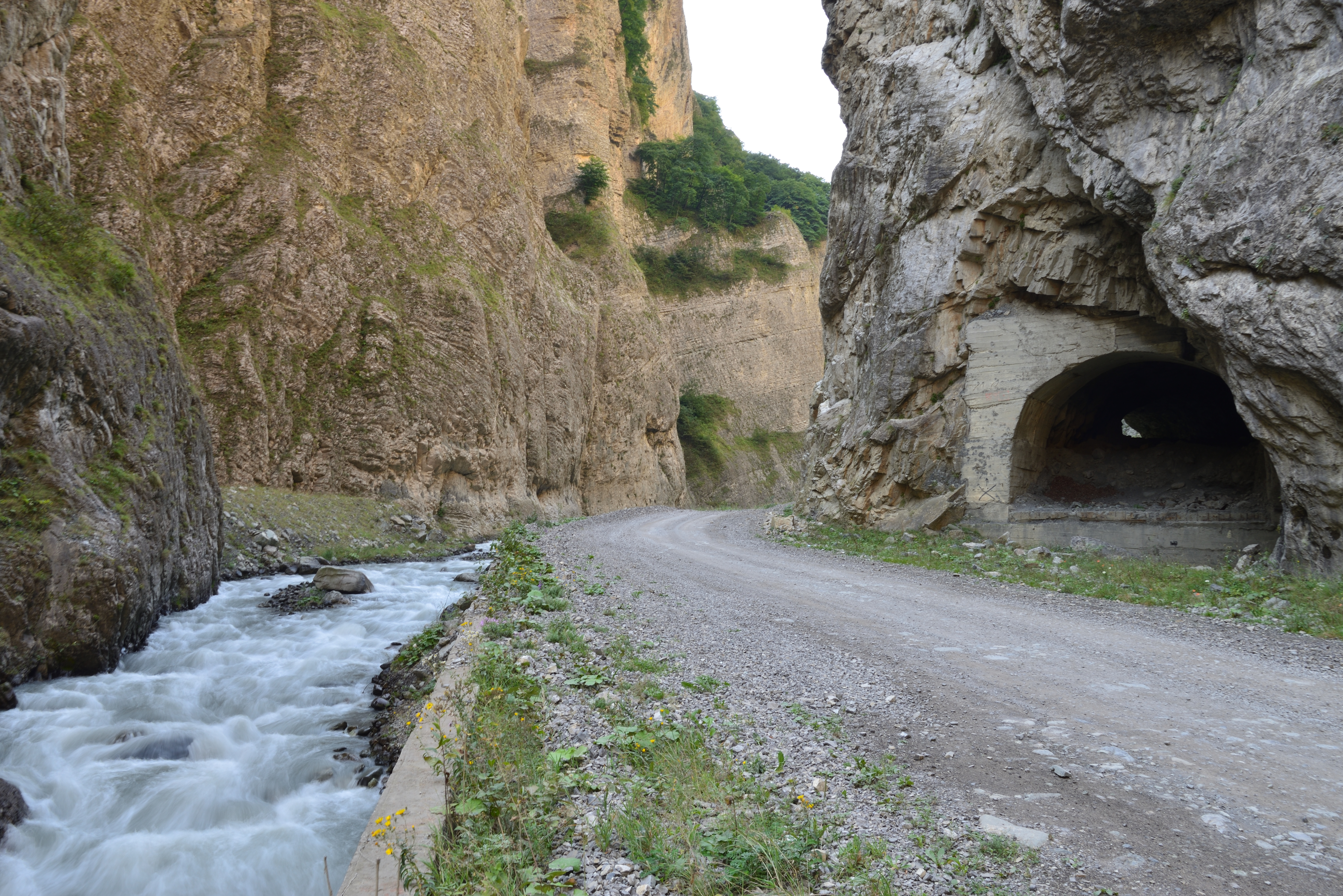
Section of the restored road in the gorge
