= Adil Soz =

Kazakh non-governmental organization

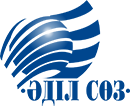
Adil Soz logo

Adil Soz, also known as the Adil Soz Foundation (Russian: Международный фонд защиты свободы слова "Адил Соз"), is a Kazakh non-governmental organization which deals with addressing corruption in Kazakhstani law and politics. Cited as a "media watchdog organization", it is the only NGO in Central Asia which belongs to the International Freedom of Expression Exchange (IFEX). The foundation is supported by USAID. Its main goal is "the establishment of an open civil society in Kazakhstan and free, objective and progressive journalism." The foundation attempts to protect journalists from government interference based on civil rights and freedom of speech, which is currently an issue in Kazakhstan. In 2008 it reported 122 incidents of harassment and violence against journalists from January to November 2008.

The International Foundation for Protection of Freedom of Speech “Adil soz” is a legal entity registered on April 12, 1999.

The Major priority of the International Foundation for Protection of Freedom of Speech “Adil soz” is the establishment of an open civil society with the promotion of objective journalism.

The main activity of the Foundation:

- Monitoring of Violations of Freedom of Speech.
- Legal activity. Two draft laws were fulfilled; judicial analysis of more 20 draft laws.
- Educational seminars “Legal protection of journalists and mass media”, “Ethnic standards and legal bases of activity of mass media”, “Linguistic safety of publications of mass media”.
- Preparation and publication for journalists. There was publication of books such as, “How to behave in court”, “The right for information”, “Cover not to incite”, “Your labour rights” and e.g.
- Legal advices of journalists and mass media. Write, call and ask.
- Legal representation of mass media’s in courts.
- Publication of monthly bulletin “Legislation and Practice of Kazakhstan’s Mass Media”
- Expertise of disputable materials in court disputes.

Foundation “Adil soz” implements the project “Protection of Democratic Principles in Central Asian States” in 2003—2007. NGO’s of Kyrgyzstan and Tajikistan (partners of the project) carry out monitoring of violations of freedom of speech and legal protection of journalists by method of the foundation “Adil soz”.

Since August 2007, “Adil soz” foundation implements the project “Ensure of legal guarantees of development in Central Asia”. The main component of the project is monitoring of Internet’s Network and violation of rights and its users in Kazakhstan.
