= Sergei Bodrov =

Russian-American film director, screenwriter, and producer

- Сергей Бодров
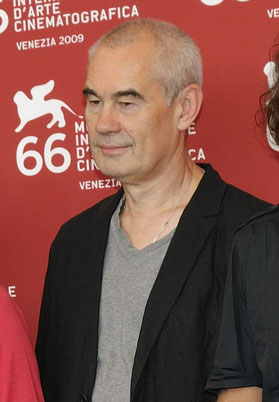
- Bodrov in 2009
- Born: Sergei Vladimirovich Bodrov; 28 June 1948 (age 78); Khabarovsk, Russian SFSR, Soviet Union
- Occupation: Film director
- Years active: 1974–present
- Spouse: Carolyn Cavallaro
- Children: Sergei Bodrov Jr.

Sergei Vladimirovich Bodrov (Russian: Серге́й Влади́мирович Бодро́в, IPA: [sʲɪrˈɡʲej bɐˈdrof]; born 28 June 1948) is a Russian-American film director, screenwriter, and producer. In 2003 he was the president of the jury at the 25th Moscow International Film Festival.

== Life ==
Bodrov was born in Khabarovsk, Russian SFSR, Soviet Union (now Russia). In the post-Soviet period he emigrated to the United States. His son, actor Sergei Bodrov, Jr. was killed in an avalanche in the mountains of the North Caucasus on 20 September 2002, while shooting a film titled The Messenger.

Bodrov was raised by his grandparents. His paternal grandmother was an ethnic Buryat, which influenced his decision to make the movie Mongol. His mother was Tatar, while his paternal grandfather was an ethnic Russian.

Bodrov currently has an apartment in Los Angeles and a ranch in Arizona. He is married to American film consultant Carolyn Cavallaro.

== Career ==
Bodrov was ones of the first group of directors under Glasnost to have more freedom to discuss topics in film that were previous made off limits by the government, and some banned films were finally able to be shown.

Bodrov originally went to school to be a space ship engineer, studying shuttle design, but in his third year he got kicked out of class due to his gambling addiction. He said the problem got so bad he robbed his grandmother, which he regretted so much that he stopped gambling after that.

He then got a job as an electrician at the government film studio, Mosfilm. He worked doing wiring on Andrei Tarkovsky films and eventually moved up to writing scripts for comedies. In 1985, he broke into directing with Sweet Juice of the Grass (1985), produced by Kazakhfilm Studios. It was screened in-competition for the 1985 Golden Leopard at the 38th Locarno Film Festival.

His second film The Non-Professionals (1985–87), was banned in the USSR for its references to the invasion of Afghanistan. In was only able to be viewed after the Fifth Congress of the Filmmakers Association of the USSR in 1986, which under Perestroika began to decentralize filmmaking in Russia and took the material efforts to "de-shelve" banned films. The Non-Professionals print was rediscovered in the government film censor's vaults in Kazakhstan. The film is about a group of young touring musicians in Kazakhstan facing the austerity of the times. The film conveys the "spiritual malaise of a generation deprived of a clear-cut role in society" and was compared to New Wave films of the 1960s.

Bodrov's next film was Freedom Is Paradise (С.Э.Р.-Svoboda eta rai, 1989), also set in Kazakhstan, and was produced by Mosfilm Studios. The film follows a 13-year-old boy in his cycle of incarcerations as he tries to cross the country to reach his father who is imprisoned in a labour camp. Bodrov was noted for his skill in selecting non-actors and the film mixes actors and non-actors alike. One such non-actor was Volodia Kozerev who was incarcerated in real life at a reform school for boys. After the filming Bodrov intervened on his behalf to get him paroled.

Bodrov's most famous film came in 1996 with Prisoner of the Mountains, about the 1990s Russian-Chechen war. It was nominated for both an Academy Award for Best Foreign Language Film and a Golden Globe. It is an avowedly anti-war movie about two Russian soldiers who are captured and held hostage by Chechens. Like many Russian directors of the era that wished to avoid overt political messages, Bodrov's film avoids dealing with the causes of the wars and its scale, instead focusing on humanist themes and compassion for Chechens and Russians. The war was still ongoing during production and the village in Dagestan where they filmed was only a two-hour walk from the war zone. For protection, Bodrov recruited locals men as guards and cast them in the film as Chechen guerrillas. This slightly backfired on Bodrov when one guard learned that the local girl cast in the movie was making more money than him. He demand his pay increase and threaten Bodrov at gun point. Afterwards, Bodrov said, "There were 24 hours of negotiation; by the end I was exhausted. We paid 10 percent of what he was asking. I'm quite an expert at these things." The film also feature the acting debut of Bodrov's son, Sergei Bodrov Jr.

As of 2008, Bodrov has directed 14 feature film and written or co-written all, but two. In 2008, he was honored at ShoWest, now called CinemaCon, for International Achievement Award in Filmmaking to accompany the U.S. release of this film Mongol.

== Awards ==
- Prisoner of the Mountains
  - Nika Award for Best Picture and Best Director.
  - Academy Award for Best Foreign Language Film nomination.
- Mongol
  - Nika Award for Best Picture and Best Director.
  - Academy Award for Best Foreign Language Film nomination.
- The Quickie
  - 23rd Moscow International Film Festival Golden St. George (nominated)

== Filmography ==
- Sweet Juice of the Grass (1985)
- The Non-Professionals (1987)
- Freedom Is Paradise (1989)
- Katala (1989)
- White King, Red Queen (1992)
- Prisoner of the Mountains (1996)
- Running Free (2000)
- The Quickie (2001)
- Bear's Kiss (2002)
- Shiza (2004)
- Nomad (2005)
- Mongol (2007)
- A Yakuza's Daughter Never Cries (2010)
- Seventh Son (2014)
- Breathe Easy (2022)
