= Kolgaküla =

Village in Estonia

Coordinates: 59°31′N 25°43′E

- Village
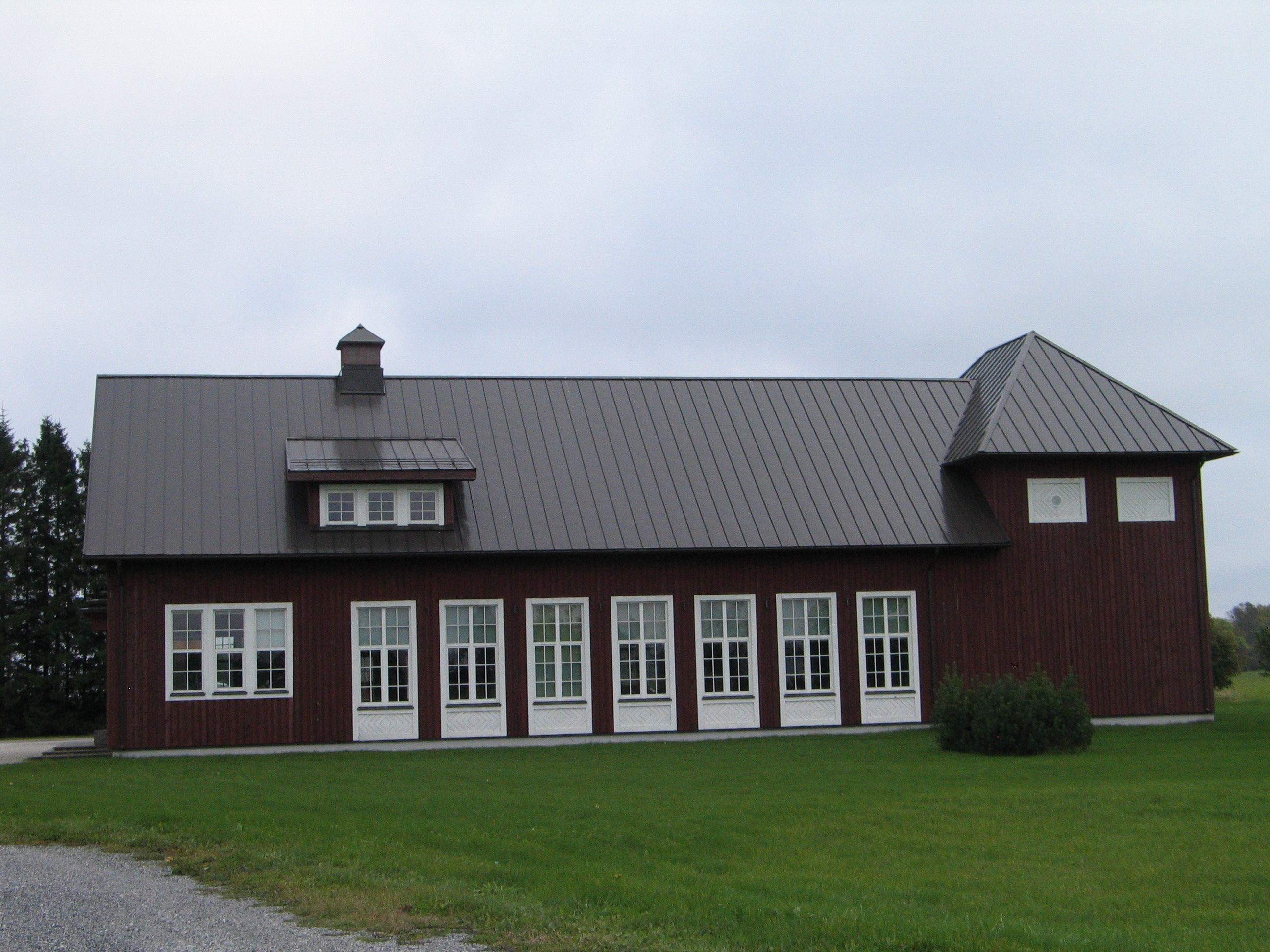
- Kolgaküla community house
- Interactive map of Kolgaküla
- Country: Estonia
- County: Harju County
- Parish: Kuusalu Parish
- Time zone: UTC+2 (EET)
  - Summer (DST): UTC+3 (EEST)

Kolgaküla is a village in Kuusalu Parish, Harju County in northern Estonia, on the territory of Lahemaa National Park. It is located about 5.5 km (3 mi) south of the town of Loksa. The Valgejõgi River passes Kolgaküla on its eastern side.
