= Maksim Kartashov =

Kazakhstani journalist

Maksim Kartashov (Russian: Максим Карташов) is a Kazakh journalist; a sports correspondent of Vremya weekly, chief editor of Hokkey Kazakhstana and a contributor to Express-K.

In August 2012, he was assaulted in Almaty at his flat.
