= Kolka Glacier =

Glacier in Russia

Kolka Glacier Хъолхъа
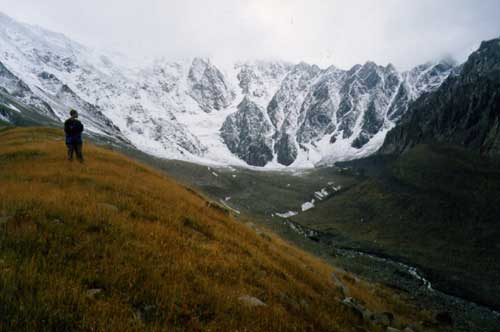
- Kolka Glacier in 2001.

- Location within Caucasus Mountains Location within North Ossetia–Alania Location within European Russia
- Interactive map of Kolka Glacier; Хъолхъа
- Type: Cirque / Valley / Hanging
- Location: North Ossetia–Alania, Russia
- Coordinates: 42°44′23″N 44°28′24″E
- Area: 2.47 km^{2} (0.95 sq mi) km^{2} (including the hanging parts)
- Length: 3,130 m (10,270 ft)
- Terminus: Moraine
- Status: Growing

Kolka Glacier (Iron Ossetic: Хъолхъа) is a glacier in North Ossetia, Russia, near Mount Kazbek, known for its surging properties. The most recent and the most powerful surge took place on 20 September 2002, resulting in the death of ca. 140 people.

== Morphology ==
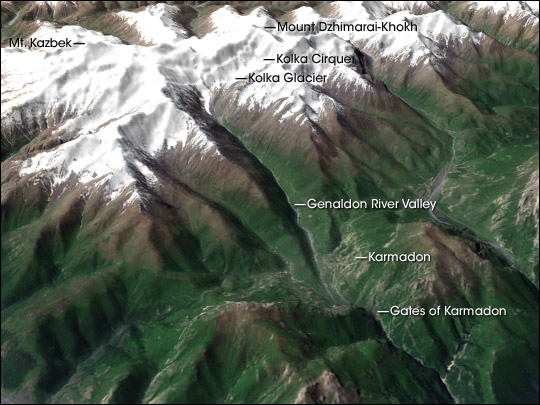
Topography of the glacier's surroundings.

There are only a small number of glaciers in the Genaldon River's basin, the largest being Maili at approximately 6.8 km^{2} (2.6 sq mi) in area. The Kolka Glacier, located next to Maili, is a cirque / valley glacier, with some hanging parts.

Kolka is fed by avalanches and collapses of firn and ice all year round. Its lowest and highest points are located at 3,000 m (9,800 ft) and 3,450 m (11,320 ft) above mean sea level respectively. More than two-thirds of the ablation zone's surface is covered by a morainal layer up to 1 m (3 ft 3 in) thick. This and other features, such as relatively gentle slopes, a deep cirque and the presence of a lateral moraine restricting the ice flow and forcing it to make a sharp turn, makes the glacier very prone to accumulation of subglacial meltwater.

== History of surges ==
Historically, the local population have been well aware of the dangers associated with the glacier, which is evident in the unusual locations of the auls. Most settlements of the Caucasus Mountains valleys were built on the valley floor, however, all the old auls of the Karmadon Valley were built on the valley slopes or even on the crests of the nearby ridges. More recently however, a number of settlements have been built on the valley floor.

=== 1902 surge ===
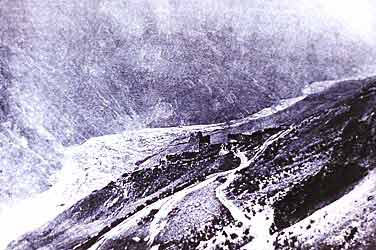
Aftermath of the 1902 surge near the Tmenikau aul.

The first well-documented surge occurred on July 3, 1902, in the midst of an unusually hot summer, when the mean temperature was 2.7 °C (36.9 °F) higher than normal. A series of heavy rains occurred in June and early July, filling the river basins with rain and melt water and by the middle of June, a tongue of the Kolka glacier was on the move. Loud crackling was heard in the nearby settlements and, at times, the Genaldon river was turned into a stream of black mud. By the end of June, the heavily cracked glacier tongue was seen in a narrow gorge next to the Maili glacier. The tongue then partially collapsed, temporarily damming the river. A pulp of ice, water and morainal material then formed a mudflow which streamed down the river's course, stopping near the Tmenikau aul high on the valley slope. The glacier, which was still on the move, then blocked the gorge causing it to fill up with meltwater.

A second mudflow surge occurred on July 6, 1902 when a 9 km (5.6 mi) stretch of the valley floor was buried underneath a mass of ice and rocks. Its thickness at times approached 50 m (160 ft), the scouring of the valley slopes reaching a height of 100 m (330 ft). The estimated volume of ice that was ejected into the valley, obstructing the gorge, was in excess of 100 million cubic metres (3.5×10^{9} cu ft). The mudflow speed averaged 60–70 km/h (37–43 mph), peaking at 100 km/h. At least 32 people died.

=== 1969 surge ===
Another notable surge started on September 28, 1969. Because its onset occurred during a colder season with minimal presence of meltwater in the glacier's basin, the event was not catastrophic. By October 4, 1969, Kolka's tongue again reached the Maili glacier, having moved 1.3 km (0.81 mi). After a month of relative calm, the glacier was on the move again by the beginning of November. A mass of fractured ice, 100–130 m (330–430 ft) thick, blocked the Upper Karmadon Springs and moved into the upper parts of the Genaldon valley, travelling at 20–50 m (66–164 ft) per day. By January 1970 it had stopped but, by then, the glacier had extended its length by 4.1 km (2.5 mi) and descended 800 m (2,600 ft).

=== 2002 surge ===
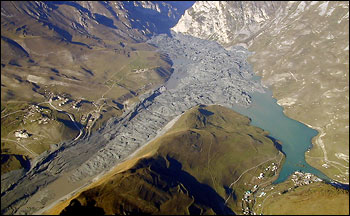
Aftermath of the 2002 surge.

The most catastrophic surge to date occurred on September 20, 2002, when a mass of ice, water and rocks streamed down a 4 km (2.5 mi) stretch of the valley with an icy mudflow traveling a further 12 km (7.5 mi). Ice within the debris began to melt almost immediately, creating new lakes and flooding some settlements which, contrary to the old traditions, had been built on the valley floor. The height of the mudflow peaked at 140 m (460 ft), with the height of the debris near the wall of the Skalisty Ridge reaching 100 m (330 ft). The village Nizhniy Karmadon, along with several rest houses beside the river were obliterated. At least 125 people died and many others were injured. The village has not been rebuilt.

The surge resulted in the complete destruction of the glacier leaving behind an empty cirque, a phenomenon not previously observed anywhere else. The large amount of subglacial water resulted in a surge so powerful, that the glacier was practically ejected from its basin. Nonetheless, it reappeared only two years later and was growing again.

== See also ==
- List of glaciers in Russia
