= Mount Dzhimara =

Mountain on the border of Georgia and Russia

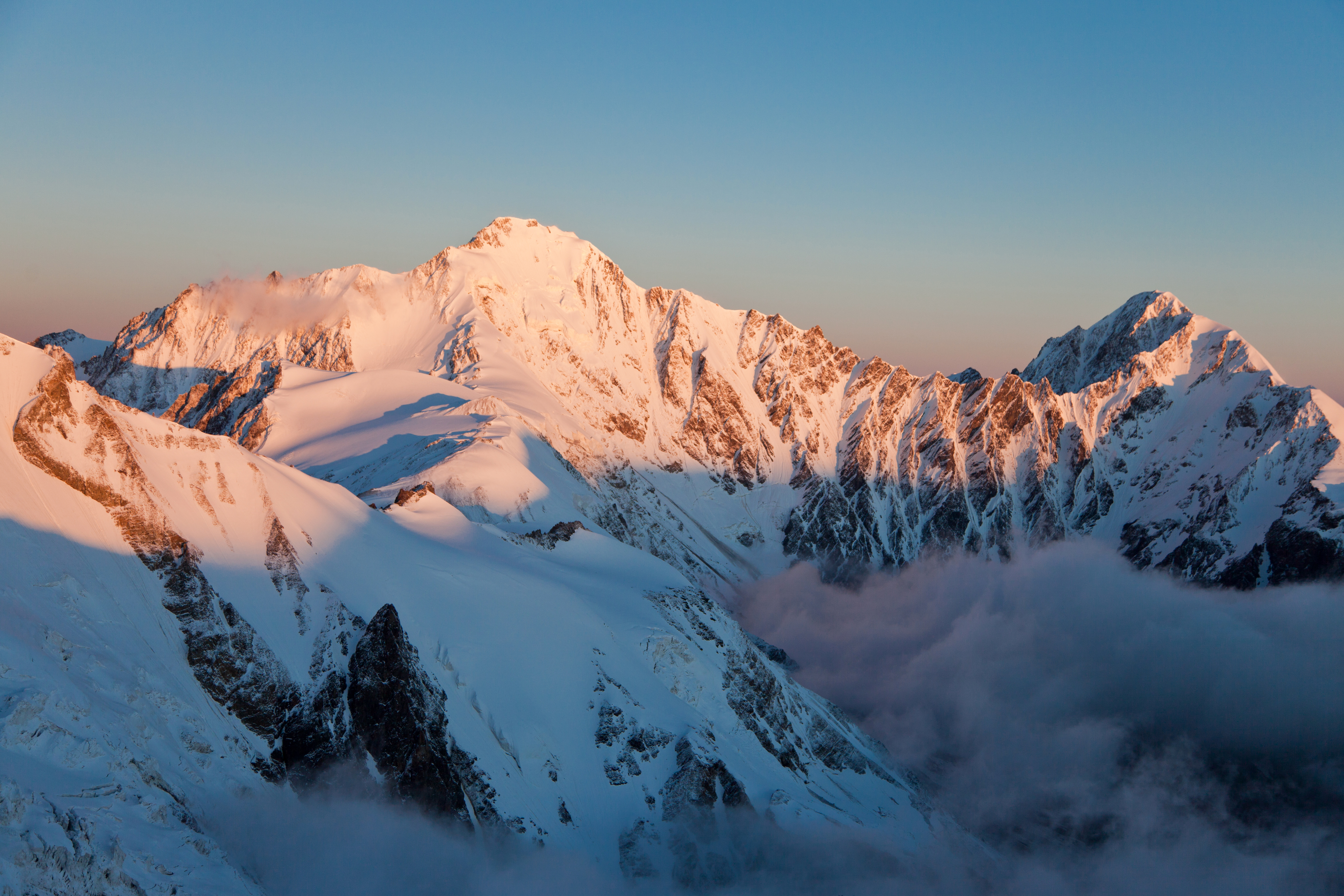
- Sunrise on Mount Dzhimara

Highest point
- Elevation: 4,780 m (15,680 ft)
- Prominence: 840 m (2,760 ft)
- Coordinates: 42°43′15″N 44°24′50″E

Naming
- Native name: Джимарайы хох (Iron Ossetic)

Geography
- Location within Mtskheta-Mtianeti Location within North Ossetia–Alania
- Location: North Ossetia–Alania, Russia / Kazbegi District, Georgia
- Countries: Georgia and Russia
- Parent range: Khokh Range (part of Caucasus)

Mount Dzhimara or Jimara (Iron Ossetic: Джимарайы хох — Džimarajy xox, Russian: Джимара, Georgian: ჯიმარა) is the second highest point of North Ossetia–Alania, a Russian republic, with an altitude of 4,780 meters (15,680 ft). It is located on the border between Russia and Georgia.

The mountain is located on the Khokh Range, 9 km (5.5 mi) to the west of Mount Kazbek.

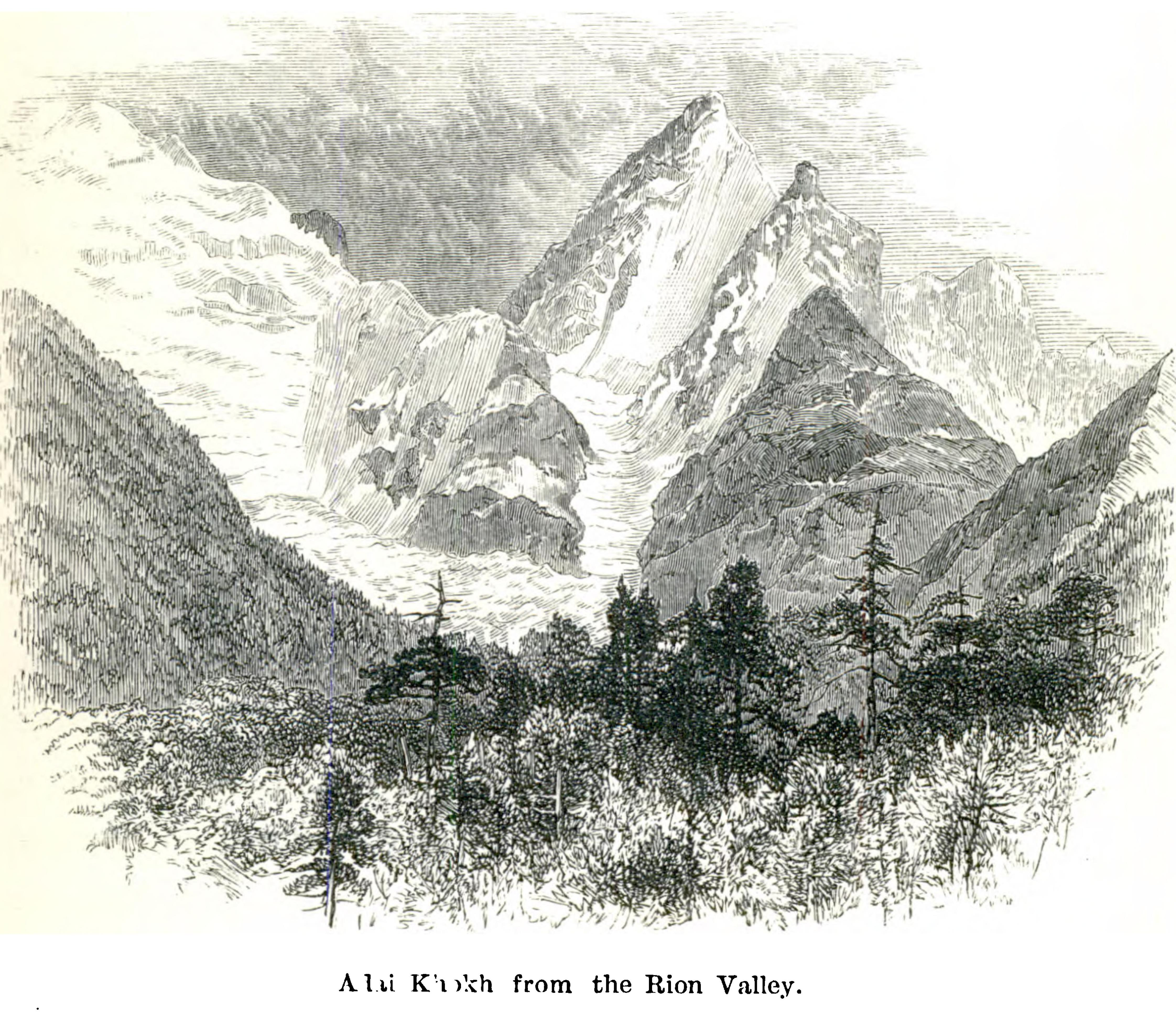
Adai Khokh from Rion valley. Douglas Freshfield (1845–1934) Travels in the central Caucasus and Bashan: including visits to Ararat and Tabreez and ascents of Kazbek and Elbruz

== See also ==
- Geography of Georgia
- Geography of Russia
