= Johann Goldammer =

Johann Georg Goldammer
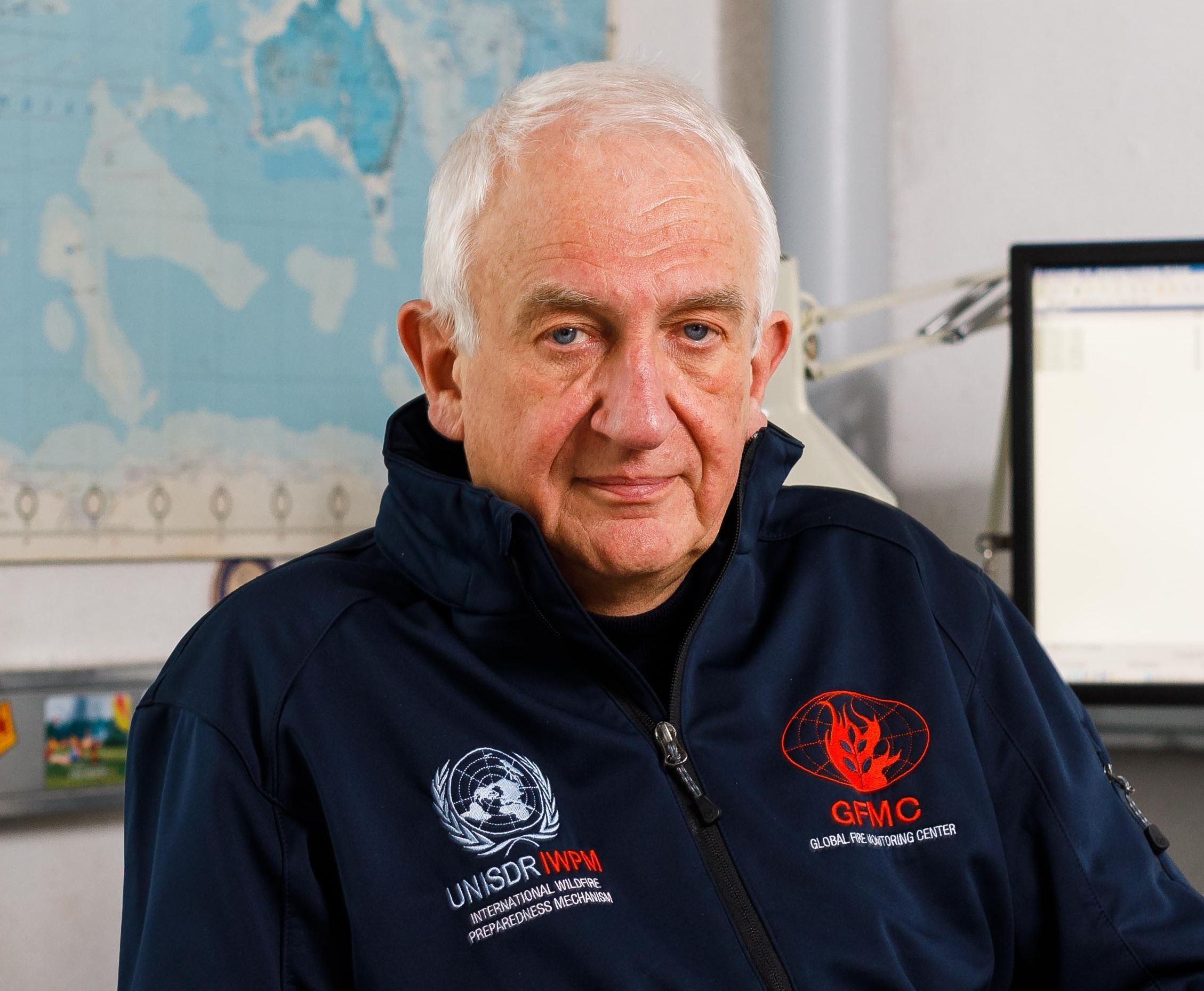
- Goldammer in 2017
- Born: 23 August 1949 (age 77); Marburg, West Germany
- Education: Freiburg University
- Known for: Research on global fire ecology Serving the Science-Policy-Practitioners Interface Establishment of the Global Fire Monitoring Center (GFMC) and the Global Wildland Fire Network
- Awards: National and International awards gfmc.online/intro/awards.html
- Scientific career
- Fields: Fire ecology
- Workplaces: Max Planck Institute for Chemistry
- Thesis: Sicherung des südbrasilianischen Kiefernanbaus durch kontrolliertes Brennen (Securing Pine Plantations in Southern Brazil by Prescribed Burning) (1983)
- Website: gfmc.online

Johann Georg Goldammer (born 23 August 1949) is director of the Global Fire Monitoring Center (GFMC), hosted by the Max Planck Institute for Chemistry (Mainz, Germany) and Freiburg University (Germany).

== Early life ==
Goldammer was born in Marburg (Germany), first son of Kurt Goldammer, professor for religious studies and history of religion and religious art at Philipps University of Marburg, and Inge Rodewald. His godfather Friedrich Heiler, was theologian and predecessor of his father. With his sisters Anna Katharina and Magdalena and his brother Christopher, he grew up in Marburg and Amöneburg and graduated at the Gymnasium Philippinum in Marburg in 1968. During the late 1960s, Oberforstmeister Dr. Johann Georg Hasenkamp, became his mentor motivating Goldammer to study forest sciences. In 1968, Goldammer was engaged in Israel in the reconciliation campaign between Germany and Israel in assisting recovery after the 1967 Six-Day War. He has been married to his wife Dorothea (née Knappe) since 1982 and they have a daughter, Katharina Jessica.

== Military career ==
In 1968, Goldammer joined the German Army. Transferred to the German Navy in 1969, he became member of Crew X/68. After graduation at the Naval Academy Marineschule Mürwik, including the serving on the training ships Gorch Fock and Deutschland he assumed duties as officer on minesweepers and minehunters. After terminating his active service in 1972, he served in the naval reserve and became the first reserve officer in the rank of Kapitänleutnant of the German Navy qualified for assuming the function of commanding officer of minesweepers and minehunters, initially on minesweeper Weilheim under supervision of Vice Admiral and Commander in Chief, German Navy, Lutz Feldt, followed by assignments of commanding officer of minesweepers and minehunters: Weilheim (1976), Konstanz (1976, 1980), Düren (1977), Marburg (1979, 1983), Koblenz (1981), Völklingen (1982), Ulm (1982) and Flensburg (1983). Towards the end of his naval career, he served as minesweeper / minehunter division commander and in the military attaché service. He was promoted to Frigate Captain (Fregattenkapitän) in 1993 and served the NATO Partnership for Peace (1997) and as honorary judge, German Armed Forces Military Court (2008). In 1985, he was awarded the Silver Cross of Honour of the German Armed Forces.

== Academic education and career ==
Between 1972 and 1977, Goldammer studied forest sciences at Freiburg University (Germany). His diploma thesis "Fire Ecology" was based on research in the USA (Tall Timbers Research Station) in 1974/75. Between 1977 and 1979 he joined the State Forest Service of Hesse (Germany) and qualified for State Forester (Assessor des Forstdienstes) in 1979. By returning to Freiburg University, he established the Fire Ecology Research Group in 1979. In 1983, he was awarded the degree of Doctor rerum naturalium (Dr. rer. nat.) (PhD in Forest Science) of Freiburg University based on his research "Sicherung des südbrasilianischen Kiefernanbaus durch kontrolliertes Brennen" (Securing Pine Plantations in Southern Brazil by Prescribed Burning), followed by Habilitation and appointment to adjunct professor for fire ecology (2001). In 1990, the Fire Ecology Research Group of Freiburg University merged with the Max Planck Institute for Chemistry and remained at the Airport Campus of Freiburg University since then.

== Scientific and application-oriented research ==
Goldammer initiated the first experiments and scientific publications on the use of prescribed fire in reducing wildfire hazard reduction in 1977 in Europe, followed by the use of prescribed fire in the maintenance and restoration of natural and cultural fire-dependent or otherwise adapted ecosystems and landscapes in the Eurasian region. He initiated, led or supported national and international research campaigns, notably under the frame of the Biomass Burning Experiment (BIBEX): Impact of Fire on the Atmosphere and Biosphere – a core project of the International Geosphere-Biosphere Programme (IGBP) International Global Atmospheric Chemistry (IGAC) project under the aegis of the Max Planck Institute for Chemistry initiated by Meinrat O. Andreae. Among other, BIBEX included the Southern African Fire-Atmosphere Research Initiative (SAFARI) for which he served as co-coordinator with Meinrat O. Andreae (1991-1996). Starting in 1991, he is serving as coordinator of the Fire Research Campaign Asia-North (FIRESCAN), which includes the 200-years Bor Forest Island Fire Experiment (1993-2192). With Nobel laureate Paul J. Crutzen he convened the Dahlem Conference "Fire in the Environment: The Ecological, Atmospheric, and Climatic Importance of Vegetation Fires" (1992). The publication was followed 20 years later by the White Paper on Vegetation Fires and Global Change directed to the United Nations and International Organizations (2013). Goldammer co-authored the Millennium Ecosystem Assessment for which UN Secretary General Kofi Annan was awarded the Zayed International Prize for the Environment 2005 and contributed to the "Second Assessment. Climate Change. A Report of the Intergovernmental Panel on Climate Change. Chapter 1: Climate Change Impacts on Forests" (1995), a report of the IPCC, which was awarded the Nobel Peace Prize in 2007.

== Achievements at the Science-Policy Interface (SPI) ==
On behalf of the Joint UNECE/FAO/ILO Committee on Forest Technology, Management and Training Goldammer in 1989 launched the first international thematic journal "International Forest Fire News" (IFFN) and served as editor until 2015. Between 1993 and 2014 he served as Leader of the UNECE/FAO/ILO Team of Specialists on Forest Fire, which supported UNECE Member States in developing national fire management policies and fostering cross-boundary cooperation in fire management. In 1998, Goldammer established the Global Fire Monitoring Center (GFMC) at the Max Planck Institute for Chemistry in cooperation with and located at Freiburg University. The start-up of GFMC was financed by the German Federal Foreign Office as a contribution to the UN International Decade for Natural Disaster Reduction (IDNDR). Since the early 1980s, Goldammer has worked with the United Nations family, multilateral and intergovernmental organizations and directly with more than 70 countries in supporting scientific-technical and policy advice for developing capacities and policies in landscape fire management. As former leader of the Working Group Wildland Fire of the UNISDR Inter-Agency Task Force for Disaster Reduction, Goldammer established the Global Wildland Fire Network and eight Regional Fire Monitoring / Fire Management Resource Centers throughout the continents. As a member of the UNDRR Science and Technology Partnership, Goldammer coordinates the UNISDR Wildland Fire Advisory Group (WFAG) and a Voluntary Commitment for the implementation of the Sendai Framework for Disaster Risk Reduction 2015-2030. At regional European level, the GMFC is serving as a Specialized Euro-Mediterranean Centre under the EUR-OPA Major Hazards Agreement of the Council of Europe. and supports the Wildfire Disaster Risk Reduction agenda of the Organization for Security and Cooperation in Europe (OSCE). GFMC is partner in the Partnership for Environment and Disaster Risk Reduction (PEDRR). In 2018, the prime minister of Greece, Mr. Alexis Tsipras, appointed Goldammer as Chair of the Committee on Perspectives of Landscape Fire Management in Greece. Starting in 1977, Goldammer has convened and co-organized numerous national, regional and international conferences and consultations. In 2023, he was appointed as a member of the Global Steering Committee WMO Vegetation Fire and Smoke Pollution Warning Advisory and Assessment System (VFSP-WAS). Based on the 2023 FAO and UNEP decision and with the support of the German government, the GMFC and its Global Wildland Fire Network and Regional Fire Management Resource Centers are transitioning to the FAO-led Global Fire Management Hub.

== Fire management and wildfire emergency response ==
Based on his scientific-technical advisory support in addressing fire management in Indonesia since 1985 and his intervention at the wildfire emergency in Ethiopia in 2000, he has supported international wildfire crisis management. In 2001, he has signed interface procedures with the United Nations Environment Programme (UNEP) / UN Office for the Coordination of Humanitarian Affairs (UN-OCHA), Joint Environment Unit, Emergency Services Branch and the Environmental Emergencies Center (EEC) and provides advisory support for preparedness and response to wildland fire emergencies. Starting in 2006, Goldammer and his team developed the EuroFire Competency Standards and Training Materials for fire management, which by 2023 are available in 22 languages. In context of community-based fire management, Goldammer and his team have developed guidelines for Defense of Villages, Farms and Other Rural Assets against Wildfires. Goldammer and GFMC are serving as Secretariat if the International Fire Aviation Working Group (IFAWG) and the International Wildfire Preparedness Mechanism. Goldammer has been deployed to international fire response and fire management missions in terrain contaminated by radioactivity and unexploded ordnance (UXO) in Ukraine and the Western Balkans and – on behalf of the UN Security Council, the OSCE and the Geneva International Discussions – to conflict and post-conflict regions of the South Caucasus including Nagorno-Karabakh, South Ossetia and Abkhazia

== Bibliography ==
Selected reviewed journal contributions and authored / edited books:

- Goldammer, J.G. 1979. Einsatz vom Kontrollierten Feuer im Forstschutz. Ein Vorversuch im Forstamt Breisach. Mit einer Einführung in die Grundlagen und Zielsetzungen des kontrollierten Brennens. Allg. Forst- und Jagdzeitung 150 (2), 41–44.
- Goldammer, J.G. 1988. Rural land-use and fires in the tropics. Agroforestry Systems 6, 235-252.
- Goldammer, J.G., and B. Seibert. 1989. Natural rain forest fires in Eastern Borneo during the Pleistocene and Holocene. Naturwissenschaften 76, 518-520.
- Goldammer, J.G. (ed.) 1990. Fire in the tropical biota. Ecosystem processes and global challenges. Ecological Studies 84, Springer-Verlag, Berlin-Heidelberg-New York, 497 p.
- Goldammer, J.G., and M.J. Jenkins (eds.) 1990. Fire in ecosystem dynamics. Mediterranean and northern perspectives. SPB Academic Publishing, The Hague, 199 p.
- Goldammer, J.G. (ed.) 1992. Tropical forests in transition: Ecology of natural and anthropogenic disturbance processes. Birkhäuser-Verlag, Basel-Boston, 270 p.
- Crutzen, P.J., and J.G. Goldammer (eds.) 1993. Fire in the environment: The ecological, atmospheric, and climatic importance of vegetation fires. Dahlem Workshop Reports. Environmental Sciences Research Report 13. John Wiley & Sons, Chichester, 400 p.
- Goldammer, J.G. 1993. Feuer in Waldökosystemen der Tropen und Subtropen. Birkhäuser-Verlag, Basel-Boston, 251 p.
- Intergovernmental Panel on Climate Change (IPCC). 1995. IPCC Second Assessment. Climate Change 1995. A Report of the Intergovernmental Panel on Climate Change. Chapter 1: Climate change impacts on forests (J.G. Goldammer, contributing author). WMO / UNEP, 63 p.
- Goldammer, J.G., and V.V. Furyaev (eds.) 1996. Fire in ecosystems of boreal Eurasia. Kluwer Academic Publ., Dordrecht, 528 pp.
- Clark, J.S., H. Cachier, J.G. Goldammer, and B.J. Stocks (eds.). 1997. Sediment records of biomass burning and global change. Springer-Verlag, Berlin-Heidelberg-New York, 489 pp.
- Goldammer, J.G. 1999. Forests on fire. Science 284, 1782-83.
- Ahern, F., J.G. Goldammer, and C. Justice (eds.). 2001. Global and regional vegetation fire monitoring from space: Planning a coordinated international effort. SPB Academic Publishing bv, The Hague, The Netherlands, 302 p.
- Goldammer, J.G., and C.de Ronde (eds.). 2004. Wildland Fire Management Handbook for Sub-Sahara Africa. Global Fire Monitoring Center and Oneworldbooks, Freiburg – Cape Town, 432 p.
- Goldammer, J.G. (ed.) 2013. Prescribed Burning in Russia and Neighbouring Temperate-Boreal Eurasia. A publication of the Global Fire Monitoring Center (GFMC). Kessel Publishing House, Remagen-Oberwinter, 326 p.
- Goldammer, J.G. (ed.). 2013. Vegetation Fires and Global Change. Challenges for Concerted International Action. A White Paper directed to the United Nations and International Organizations. Kessel Publishing House, Remagen-Oberwinter, 398 p.
- De Ronde, C., and J.G. Goldammer. 2015. Wildfire Investigation. Guidelines for Practitioners. A publication of the Global Fire Monitoring Center (GFMC). Kessel Publishing House, Remagen-Oberwinter, 131 p.
- Goldammer, J.G. 2021. Thirty Years International Wildland Fire Conferences: Review and Achievements of a Circumglobal Journey from Boston to Campo Grande. Biodiversidade Brasileira 11 (2), 2021, 6-52. DOI: 10.37002/biobrasil.v10i3.1743.
- Pasiecznik, N. and J.G. Goldammer (eds.). 2022. Towards fire-smart landscapes. Tropical Forest Issues 61. Tropenbos International, Ede, the Netherlands. xiv +191 pp. doi.org/10.55515/DVRK2501 (ISSN: 2958-4426).
- Goldammer, J.G. und J. Karns (Hrsg.). 2019. Carl Alwin Schenck. Memoiren 1868 bis 1887. Forstbuchverlag Kessel, Remagen-Oberwinter, 328 p.

== About ==
- A Scientist Tracks the World's Fires (The Wall Street Journal, 8 February 1999)
- Feuer-Management für Raumschiff Erde (Supposé Sanders. 2009)
- The Bor Forest Island Fire Experiment (ZDF/Arte, 1993)
- East of the Wind and West of the Rain (Interdisciplinary Studies in Literature and Environment 22.1, 155–163. Oxford University Press, 21 February 2015)
- Stifterverband Deutsche Wissenschaft (Association of Sponsors for Science in Germany): Forschergeist Feueroekologie (Science Spirit Fire Ecology) (30 January 2019)
- Im Zeitalter des Feuers (DIE ZEIT, 28 July 2022)

== Honors and awards ==
- United Nations Sasakawa Award for Disaster Reduction (2001)
- Golden State Medal, Baden Württemberg State (Germany) for "Merits for Rural Space, Agriculture, and Forestry" (2001)
- Medal of the Russian Government for "Saving and Multiplying the Forest Resources of Russia" (1999)
- Memorial Medals of the Federal Forest Agency, Ministry of Agriculture, Government of the Russian Federation, for the Merits in Protecting the Forests of the Russian Federation (2009) and the Aerial Forest Fire Center Avialesookhrana (2006, 2016, 2021)
- Honorary Doctor Degree, Mongolian State University of Agriculture (2007)
- Award El Batefuego de Oro (The Golden Fire Swatter), International Category, Spain (2008)
- Honorary Doctor Degree, National University of Life and Environmental Sciences of Ukraine (2013)
- Certificate of Honour, Ministry of Environment, Green Development and Tourism of Mongolia (2015)
- Mongolia National Emergency Management Agency (NEMA) State Medal Class III for Disaster Reduction (2015)
- Professor Niklas Gold Medal, Federal Ministry of Food and Agriculture, Germany (2020)
- Bintang Jasa Utama (Star of Service), President of Republic of Indonesia (2021)
- Honorary Doctor Degree, Aristotelion National University of Thessaloniki, Greece (2022)
- Cross of Merit of the Order of Merit of the Federal Republic of Germany (2024)
