= Couple from the Future =

- Theatrical release poster
- Directed by: Aleksey Nuzhnyy
- Written by: Yevgeny Kulik; Dmitry Baluev; Aleksey Nuzhnyy
- Produced by: Leonid Vereshchagin (ru); Anton Zlatopolskiy (ru); Rafael Minasbekyan; Nikita Mikhalkov; Aleksey Nuzhnyy
- Starring: Sergey Burunov; Mariya Aronova; Denis Paramonov; Darya Konyzheva
- Cinematography: Yuriy Korobeynikov
- Edited by: Avet Oganesyan
- Music by: Kirill Borodulev; Yevgeny Barkhatov
- Production companies: Studio TriTe; Russia-1
- Distributed by: Central Partnership
- Release date: March 4, 2021 (Russia)
- Running time: 104 minutes
- Country: Russia
- Language: Russian
- Box office: ₽>536.1 million; $8.4 million (Worldwide)

Couple from the Future (Russian: Пара из будущего, romanized: Para iz budushchego) is a 2021 Russian science fiction comedy-drama film written and directed by Aleksey Nuzhnyy, with a co-produced by Leonid Vereshchagin, Anton Zlatopolskiy, and Nikita Mikhalkov. The main roles were played by Sergey Burunov and Mariya Aronova.

It is scheduled to be theatrically released in Russia on March 4, 2021 by Central Partnership.

== Premise ==
The film is set in 2040. The action takes place in Nizhny Novgorod. The film tells about a couple who have been married for 20 years and want to divorce, but cannot, since it is very expensive. And suddenly they fall into the past, on the day when he proposed to her to marry him.

== Cast ==
- Sergey Burunov as Eugene 'Zhenya' Kurkov in 2040
  - Denis Paramonov as Eugene 'Zhenya' Kurkov in 2020
- Mariya Aronova as Alexandra 'Sasha' Zolotareva in 2040
  - Darya Konyzheva as Alexandra 'Sasha' Zolotareva in 2020
- Igor Tsaregorodtsev as Oleg, a gopnik for firewood in the village
- Georgiy Tokaev as Ivan, a man chopping wood
- Mikhail Orlov as Igor, Zhenya's uncle
- Serafima Krasnikova as Valentina Odnolyubova, Zhenya's classmate
- Karina Mishulina as Oksana Sinitsyna, an actress
  - Marina Volkova as Oksana Sinitsyna in 2020
- Sergey Styopin as Mikhal Mikhalych, director
- Seydulla Moldakhanov as a shepherd
- Pavel Misailov as a Russian police office
- Aleksey Nuzhnyy as himself, a casting directors of auditions
- Irina Gorbacheva as a computer (voice)

== Production ==
In August 2020, it became known that the Cinema Foundation approved support for the production of a new film was directed by Aleksey Nuzhnyy, who had previously directed the film I Am Losing Weight (2018).

The film was produced with the assistance of Nikita Mikhalkov's Studio TriTe and the Russia-1 network with the support of the Russian Cinema Fund Analytics.

=== Casting ===
Sergey Burunov and Mariya Aronova also had a pleasant time on the set, and acted exactly like a couple from the film. Both performers graduated from the Boris Shchukin Theatre Institute.

=== Filming ===
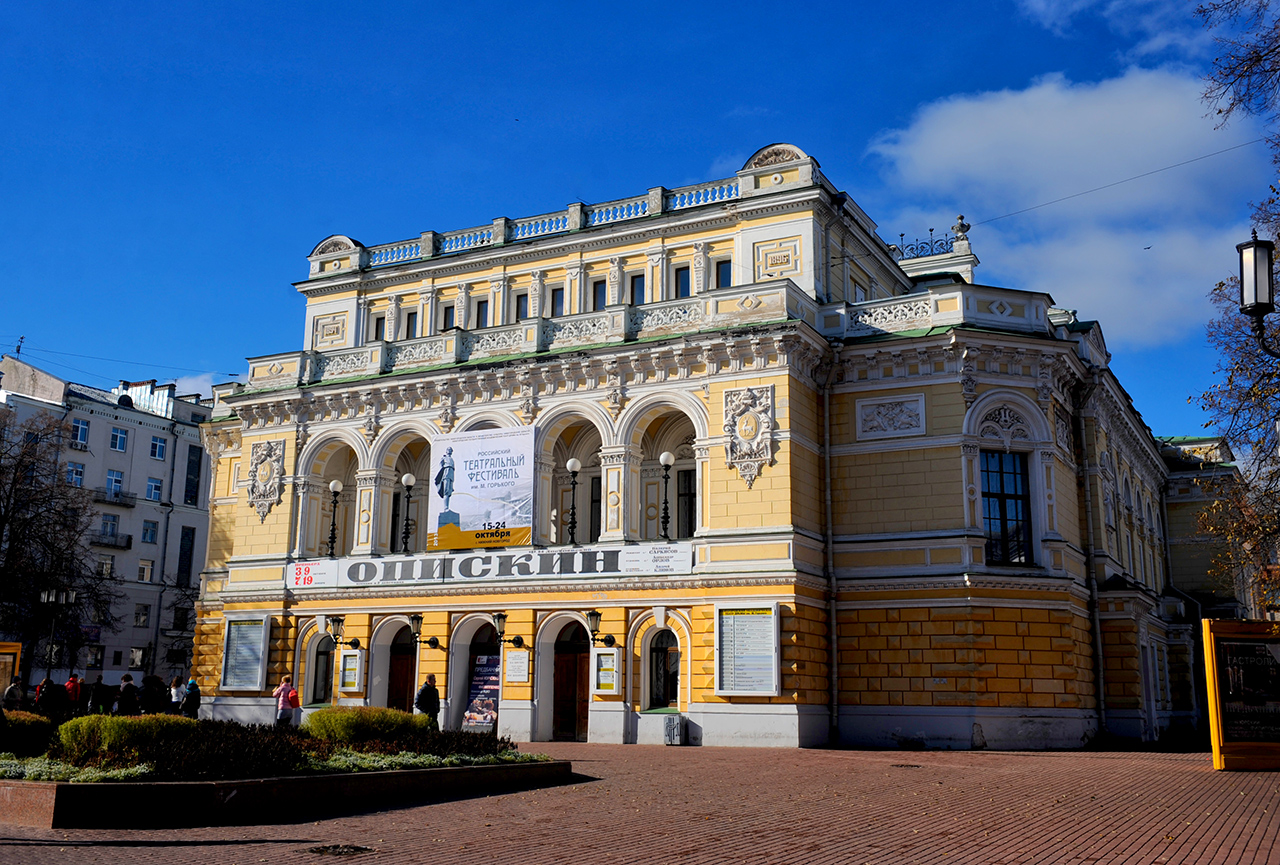
Nizhny Novgorod Drama Theater named after M. Gorky in Nizhny Novgorod.

Principal photography took place in September 2020 at the M. Gorky Nizhny Novgorod State Academic Drama Theatre, where the townspeople performed as extras in the city of Nizhny Novgorod. In October 2020, they were held in the administrative okrug of Moscow (Zelenograd).

== Release ==
=== Theatrical ===
The pre-premiere event was held on March 1, 2021 at the "Karo 11 October" cinema in Moscow, and will go on commercial screenings on March 4 of that year. The release of the film Couple from the Future on the big screens is scheduled for March 4, 2021 by Central Partnership.

== Reception ==
A review by KinoAfish noted: "The film Couple from the Future is a classic dramedy, but humor here gives way to matters of the heart, the tangled jungle of which the heroes will have to overcome in the course of the action."

A review by Russian Gazette noted that "the film is a combination of many genres, from rom-com to cyberpunk satire. The script of the film is built like a paradox."

The Yandex review commented: "Sergey Burunov came out more textured than in the recent The Relatives, and Mariya Aronova had an unforgettable performance."
