= Fire (2020 film) =

2020 Russian disaster film

- Theatrical release poster
- Directed by: Aleksey Nuzhnyy
- Written by: Nikolay Kulikov; Aleksey Nuzhnyy; Konstantin Mayer
- Produced by: Leonid Vereshchagin (ru); Anton Zlatopolskiy (ru); Rafael Minasbekyan; Nikita Mikhalkov; Aleksey Nuzhnyy; Sergey Kornikhin
- Starring: Konstantin Khabenskiy; Ivan Yankovskiy; Stasya Miloslavskaya; Anton Bogdanov; Viktor Dobronravov; Roman Kurtsyn; Tikhon Zhiznevsky; Irina Gorbacheva; Yuriy Kuznetsov; Andrey Smolyakov
- Cinematography: Mikhail Milashin
- Edited by: Avet Hovhannisyan
- Music by: Kirill Borodulev
- Production companies: Central Partnership; Russia-1; Studio TriTe; Cinema Fund
- Distributed by: Central Partnership; Shout! Studios (USA)
- Release date: December 24, 2020 (Russia)
- Running time: 131 minutes
- Country: Russia
- Language: Russian
- Budget: ₽550 million
- Box office: ₽926.8 million; $12.582.824 (Worldwide); $12.179.242 (Russia/CIS)

Fire (Russian: Огонь, romanized: Ogon), also known as No Escapes, is a 2020 Russian disaster film directed by Aleksey Nuzhnyy. A heroic story about firefighters and rescuers of the Aerial Forest Protection Service and the Ministry of Emergency Situations, who resist the merciless elements and turn out to be the only hope of people in trouble. The film includes real footage of forest fires in the Krasnoyarsk Territory.

It was theatrically released in Russia on December 24, 2020 by Central Partnership. The film grossed over 926.8 million rubles compared to a production budget of 550 million rubles and was crowned a commercial success.

== Plot ==
The film tells about firefighters and rescuers who stand in the way of a cruel element. Veteran firefighter Andrey Pavlovich Sokolov (Konstantin Khabenskiy) leads an elite team from the Aerial Forest Protection Service and the Ministry of Emergency Situations. The routine turns deadly when a forest blaze claims one of their own. Meanwhile, Sokolov discovers that his daughter Katya (Stasya Miloslavskaya) is seeing Roman Ilyin (Ivan Yankovskiy), a rookie firefighter from Moscow. To keep a close eye on his daughter and teach the newcomer the rigors of the profession, Sokolov forces Roman into the frontline crew.

Assigned to tackle a massive wildfire threatening a remote village, the group — including persuaded Roman — faces roaring flames, collapsing terrain, and fraught rescues. As the fire intensifies, Andrey must bridge trust with Roman under harrowing conditions. The villagers, besieged by fire, rely wholly on the crew’s heroic efforts. Sacrifices are made, and personal growth unfolds amid the inferno.

== Cast ==
- Konstantin Khabenskiy as Aleksey Pavlovich Sokolov
- Ivan Yankovskiy as Roman Ilyin
- Stasya Miloslavskaya as Ekaterina 'Katya' Sokolova
- Anton Bogdanov as Konstantin 'Kostik' Zhuravel
- Viktor Dobronravov as Pyotr Velichuk
- Roman Kurtsyn as Sergey Zotov
- Tikhon Zhiznevsky as Maksim Shustov
- Irina Gorbacheva as Zoya, a woman in labor
- Evgeniya Dmitrieva as Nina
- Yuriy Kuznetsov as Georgich
- Tatyana Bedova as Georgich's wife
- Viktor Sukhorukov as a pilot Okopych
- Andrey Smolyakov as Vladimir Gromov
- Aleksandr Oblasov as Valera, observer pilot
- Boris Dergachev as Pavel Borisov

== Production ==
The film was shot by Nikita Mikhalkov's Studio TriTe in collaboration with VGTRK Corporation and the television channel Russia-1, distributed by Central Partnership and supported by the Government Russian Cinema Fund.

=== Filming ===
Principal photography began from May to September 2019 in the Republic of Karelia forests and the Moscow Oblast, in the city of Taganrog, Rostov Oblast, in the city of Vsevolozhsk, Leningrad Oblast, and in the city of Vladimir, Vladimir Oblast. The film crew was consulted by specialists from the MChS and the Aerial Forest Protection Service in Siberia, who also provided unique air transport: Mil Mi-8 helicopters participated in the filming, Ilyushin Il-62, Antonov An-26 aircraft and multipurpose Beriev Be-200.

The ground photographs were taken by real rescuers and firefighters from the MChS and the Federal Agency for Forestry's Aerial Forest Protection Service. The scene of extinguishing a forest fire, in which the Beriev Be-200 seaplane was involved, was filmed simultaneously with six cameras.

== Release ==
It was released in the Russian Federation on December 24, 2020 by Central Partnership.
