= The Bremen Town Musicians (2023 film) =

- Theatrical release poster
- Russian: Bremenskiye muzykanty
- Directed by: Aleksey Nuzhnyy
- Written by: Aleksey Nuzhnyy; Igor Grinyakin (ru)
- Based on: Soyuzmultfilm's The Bremen Town Musicians and "Town Musicians of Bremen" by the Brothers Grimm
- Produced by: Leonid Vereshchagin (ru); Anton Zlatopolsky (ru); Nikita Mikhalkov; Aleksey Nuzhnyy
- Starring: Tikhon Zhiznevsky; Valentina Lyapina; Sergey Burunov; Mariya Aronova; Konstantin Khabensky; Yulia Peresild; Askar Nigamedzyanov; Irina Gorbacheva; Roman Kurtsyn; Dmitri Dyuzhev
- Cinematography: Igor Grinyakin
- Edited by: Kirill Piskarev
- Music by: Gennady Gladkov; Maxim Fadeev; Yuri Entin
- Production companies: Studio TriTe; Russia-1; Soyuzmultfilm; Central Partnership Productions; Sber (general partner); Cinema Fund
- Distributed by: Central Partnership
- Release dates: December 18, 2023 (Karo 11 October); January 1, 2024 (Russia)
- Running time: 116 minutes
- Country: Russia
- Language: Russian
- Budget: ₽1.200 billion
- Box office: ₽3.036 billion; $38.8 million

The Bremen Town Musicians (Russian: Бременские музыканты, romanized: Bremenskiye muzykanty) is a 2023 Russian musical fantasy film based on Brothers Grimm fairy tale Town Musicians of Bremen.

The film was directed by Aleksey Nuzhnyy, who co-wrote the script with Igor Grinyakin as co-author, is a live-action remake of Inessa Kovalevskaya's 1969 Soviet animated short film The Bremen Town Musicians and its 1973 sequel On the Trail of the Bremen Town Musicians, produced by the Soyuzmultfilm studio. It stars Tikhon Zhiznevsky as the title character, he tells the adventures of Troubadour, a group of traveling musicians, alongside Askar Nigamedzyanov as the Rooster, Irina Gorbacheva as the Cat, Roman Kurtsyn as the Dog, and Dmitri Dyuzhev will try to play the Donkey. The music and songs for the film were written by Maxim Fadeev together with Gennady Gladkov.

The Bremen Town Musicians premiered at the Karo 11 October in Moscow on December 18, 2023, and was theatrically released in Russia on January 1, 2024. It was released back-to-back with Central Partnership's Serf 2. The film grossed over 3 billion rubles at the box office and received mixed reviews from critics and audiences.

== Plot ==
A boy named Troubadour, with extraordinary musical talent, loses his mother early and comes to the city of Bremen, where he wants to sing in the square. He is caught by child robbers and brought to their chieftain, Louise, who expresses a desire to hear the Troubadour sing. Louise is impressed by the boy's talent and uses him to rob people while they are enchanted by the Troubadour's song. But one day the Ingenious Detective comes on the trail of the atamansha; she manages to escape, and the Troubadour is put in prison. Being released many years later, the Troubadour goes to the bridge, under which there used to be a den of robbers, to get even with Louise. The robbers are no longer there, and instead of them the man meets the anthropomorphic Dog, Donkey, Rooster and Cat – wandering musicians who, impressed by the Troubadour's playing of the electric guitar, take him into their group as a soloist.

The Troubadour and the Animals come to the square to perform at the Dreams music festival, which will be attended by the King, who is experiencing a tense relationship with his daughter, the capricious and ardent Princess. None of the contestants impresses the King, and only an impromptu song by the group "The Bremen Town Musicians" (as the Troubadour called himself and the animals) induces the Princess to go out onto the balcony, where she meets the Troubadour, and the group wins the competition. The King allows the Troubadour to dance with the Princess, albeit mockingly; During the dance, the Princess flirts with the Troubadour and forces him to kiss her, making it look like he was the initiator. For this, "The Bremen Town Musicians" are driven out of Bremen, and they travel through the forest, where they are pursued by robbers. During the chase, the Troubadour notices the Princess hidden in a chest and, with the help of the Cat, saves her from the robbers.

The Princess is glad to get out of the palace, but the Troubadour insists on returning her home. The Princess invites the animals to perform at a nighttime music festival, and they agree, despite the Troubadour's objections. Meanwhile, having discovered his daughter's disappearance, the King sends a Detective to search for her. On the way to the festival, the Bremen Men rehearse under the direction of the Princess, trying to come up with a song with which they will perform; In parallel, the Troubadour and the Princess eventually fall in love with each other. On stage the night before the performance, they almost kiss, but the Detective puts the Princess to sleep with a dart containing a sleeping potion and escapes with her. However, despite having completed his task, the King refuses to pay the Detective and taunts him.

The Troubadour is going to return to Bremen and save his beloved, but halfway he ends up in a den of robbers, where he meets Louise. He is angry at the woman because she used him and did nothing to free him, but the man's anger only impresses the chieftain. She agrees to help: she and the Troubadour arrange everything so that he supposedly "cleared the forest of robbers" (naturally, bringing them all with him as proof), and the gates of Bremen are opened. As soon as the King and his guards leave the city, the Troubadour enters the Princess's chambers, and the robbers seize power in the city. The Princess is frightened by this and becomes angry with the Troubadour, who realizes that Louise has used him again. The Troubadour finds himself in prison and repents before his mother, to whom he once promised to "sing from the bottom of my heart," but the Detective saves him and gets into the cell in his place.

Meanwhile, the Bremen Town Musicians take the stage with an incomplete lineup, and at first their performance does not delight the crowd, but the situation is saved by the appearance of the Troubadour. He admits that he is to blame for the chieftain's seizure of power and asks for help from the animals. Everyone except the Rooster agrees and together with the Troubadour they go to Bremen. The next morning, the robbers prepare to expel the Detective, the King and the Princess from the city using a mechanism called the "Royal kick". They are preparing to expel the Detective first, but right before the strike he suddenly disappears. The troubadour, the animals, the King and the Princess enter into battle with the robbers, but they are caught, and the King flies beyond the city wall. The "musicians" are about to be burned in their wooden cart along with the Princess, but the Rooster comes to their aid and puts out the fire. After this, Louise is expelled from Bremen, and she falls into a swamp, where she meets the King, to whom she confesses that she wants not to be feared, but to be loved.

The King marries the chieftain, and the Troubadour marries the Princess, and in honor of this a ball is held in the palace. The animals are sad, since they have already become attached to the Troubadour, and leave Bremen, but the Troubadour and the Princess catch up with them.

== Cast ==
- Tikhon Zhiznevsky as the Troubadour
  - Miron Provorov as the Troubadour as a child
- Valentina Lyapina as the Princess
- Sergey Burunov as the Silly King
- Mariya Aronova as Louise, the Atamansha of a gang of robbers
- Konstantin Khabensky as the Detective
- Yulia Peresild as the Troubadour's mother

Anthropomorphic animals

- Askar Nigamedzyanov as the Rooster
- Irina Gorbacheva as the Cat
- Roman Kurtsyn as the Dog
- Dmitri Dyuzhev as the Donkey

Other cast members

- Teresa Diuro as Afro girl
- Ekaterina Novokreshchenova as Sparkle
  - Santa Nuzhnaya as Sparkle as a child
- Nikita Nikitin as the Hook
- Arthur Ivanov as Dark, chief of the king's guard
- Igor Alekseev as Joseph, the king's guard
- Ilya Varankin as a guard
- Mikhail Konovalov as a guard
- Anton Krotov as the king's physician
- Ivan Filippov as the dwarf jester
- Stefan Petrov as the king's court artist
- Sergey Melkonyan as the king's treasurer
- Oksana Surkova as a seamstress
- Elizaveta Stolbova as a washerwoman
- Kirill Snegiryov as a dynamo electrician
- Mikhail Selivanov as a robber
- Nikolay Samsonov as a robber
- Anton Konovalov as a robber
- Kirill Frolov as a robber
- Anna Kramer as a robber woman
- Milena Nesterova as a lady-in-waiting
- Mariya Zhidkova as a lady-in-waiting
- Vladislav Kudryaev as a townsman
- Vasiliy Atanov as a townsman
- Deya Sibert as a townschild
- Gennadiy Iskortsev as a poet-whisperer
- Pavel Stont as a herald
- Bogdan Kiyashko as an Italian singer

== Production ==
=== Development ===
Since 2022, the studios "TriTe", created by film director Nikita Mikhalkov, and "Soyuzmultfilm" presented at the full-time defense of the "Cinema Foundation" an adaptation of the Soviet cartoon The Bremen Town Musicians (1969), announcing that Aleksey Nuzhnyy would become a director.

In January 2023, the Minister of Culture Olga Lyubimova announced that the film could receive support from the Ministry of Culture, intending to continue the "course towards family cinema" in connection with the box office success of the 2023 film Cheburashka, which collected more than 4 billion rubles in just over one week.

=== Casting ===
The main role is played by Tikhon Zhiznevsky, the star of the Russian film comic strip Major Grom. The actor embodied on the screen the image of the leader of the musical group Troubadour and his encounter with talking animals. The main contender for the role of the Rooster was initially Yuri Borisov, who dropped out of the project due to his busy schedule. The company Zhiznevsky on the set was made up of no less famous and talented actors – Borisov in the role of the Rooster was replaced by Askar Nigamedzyanov, Irina Gorbacheva, Roman Kurtsyn, and Dmitri Dyuzhev. The actors spent three hours doing makeup before filming. At first, Burunov refused the role of the King because, in his words, "he didn't understand how to play," but Nuzhnyy still managed to persuade the actor.

=== Filming ===
Principal photography began in the summer of 2023, taking place in the Republic of Dagestan, the Kabardino-Balkarian Republic, the Chechen Republic, the Republic of Ingushetia and the forests near Moscow region until August 2023. Two months before filming, a set of 100 houses, a city wall and a castle was built.

== Music ==
The Bremen Town Musicians (Original Motion Picture Soundtrack)

Soundtrack album by various artists
- Released: December 29, 2023
- Length: 37:23
- Language: Russian
- Label: The Bremen Town Musicians

At the time of the announcement, the creators had already received a license to process the original compositions by Gennady Gladkov, which were heard in the cartoon. The actors themselves sang songs and played musical instruments.

== Release ==
=== Marketing ===
The first teaser trailer of The Bremen Town Musicians was released on September 13, 2023. The video caused a mostly negative reaction from viewers: many noted the repulsive images of animals, which had an "uncanny valley" effect and were reminiscent of characters from the 2019 film Cats. Viewers also jokingly called the film an adaptation of the video game Hotline Miami (2012).

=== Theatrical ===
The Bremen Town Musicians held its world premiere took place on December 18, 2023, at the Karo 11 October cinema center on New Arbat Avenue in Moscow. On December 24, a special screening will take place at the Aurora cinema in Saint Petersburg, where the film will be presented by Zhiznevsky. The film was released in the Russian Federation on January 1, 2024, including in the premium CosMAX format. The distributor of the film was Central Partnership.

== Reception ==
=== Box office ===
On its first day, The Bremen Town Musicians collected 198.9 million rubles at the Russian box office, losing leadership only to another Central Partnership release, also released on January 1, the film Serf 2 (295 million). By January 4, the film's box office reached 1 billion rubles; according to the KinoNews portal, which calculated the film's budget without taking into account funds from the Russian Cinema Fund, the project began to make a profit from that moment. On January 9, collections exceeded 2 billion rubles.

== See also ==
- Cinderella (2021 film)
