= Angels of War (2026 film) =

- Directed by: Alexander Kott
- Written by: Mikhail Zubko; Igor Kagramanov; Elena Kvasova-Duffort
- Produced by: Anton Zlatopolsky; Vadim Vereshchagin; Natalya Kotkova; Irina Malysheva; Liliya Chekster; Irina Bark
- Starring: Tikhon Zhiznevsky; Roman Evdokimov; Viktor Dobronravov; Kseniya Treyster; Polina Agureeva; Yevgeny Sidikhin; Vadim Skvirsky
- Cinematography: Sergey Astakhov
- Production companies: Russia-1; Central Partnership Productions; Kinoprime Foundation; Masterskaya Film Company; Cinema Fund
- Distributed by: Central Partnership
- Release dates: April 16, 2026 (MIFF); April 23, 2026 (Russia)
- Running time: 110 minutes
- Country: Russia
- Language: Russian
- Budget: ₽749 million
- Box office: ₽359 million

Angels of War (Russian: Ангелы Ладоги, lit. 'Angels of Ladoga') is a 2026 Russian war drama film directed by Alexander Kott, it tells the story of the heroic deeds of iceboat sailors during the Siege of Leningrad. In November 1941, the heroes evacuate children across the thin ice of Lake Ladoga. The film stars Tikhon Zhiznevsky, Roman Evdokimov, Viktor Dobronravov, and Kseniya Treyster.

Angels of War was the opening film of the 48th Moscow International Film Festival, where it premiered on April 16, 2026. This film was theatrically released in Russia on April 23, 2026, by Central Partnership.

== Plot ==
The film takes place in 1941. Young sailors find themselves on thin ice. They must band together to survive and give hope to orphans from an orphanage.

== Cast ==
- Tikhon Zhiznevsky as Pavel Ukolov, an energetic and cheerful yachtsman who was a rival before the war and became a loyal comrade-in-arms of Pyotr Vetrov during the war.
- Roman Evdokimov as Pyotr Vetrov, an iceboat sailor, and Pavel Ukolov's partner
- Viktor Dobronravov as Captain Mikhail Kholin, a yachting coach who becomes the commander of a squad of iceboaters at the outbreak of the Great Patriotic War.
- Kseniya Treyster as Olga, a fragile but dedicated preschool teacher at an orphanage.
- Polina Agureeva as Nina, the curator of the Zoological Museum, a worker who cares for and maintains humanity in the midst of war.
- Yevgeny Sidikhin as Smetanin
- Vadim Skvirsky as Nikolai Ludewig, an engineer involved in the design and construction of an ice route across Lake Ladoga to save Leningrad.
- Arseny Semyonov as Sergei Orlyonok, an iceboat sailor
- Azamat Nigmanov as Kumbaev, an iceboat sailor
- Alexander Kononets as Stuzhev, an iceboat sailor
- Yegor Alimov as Mitya, a boy
- Andrey Merzlikin as a Soviet Major, and Mitya's father
- Dirk Martens

== Production ==
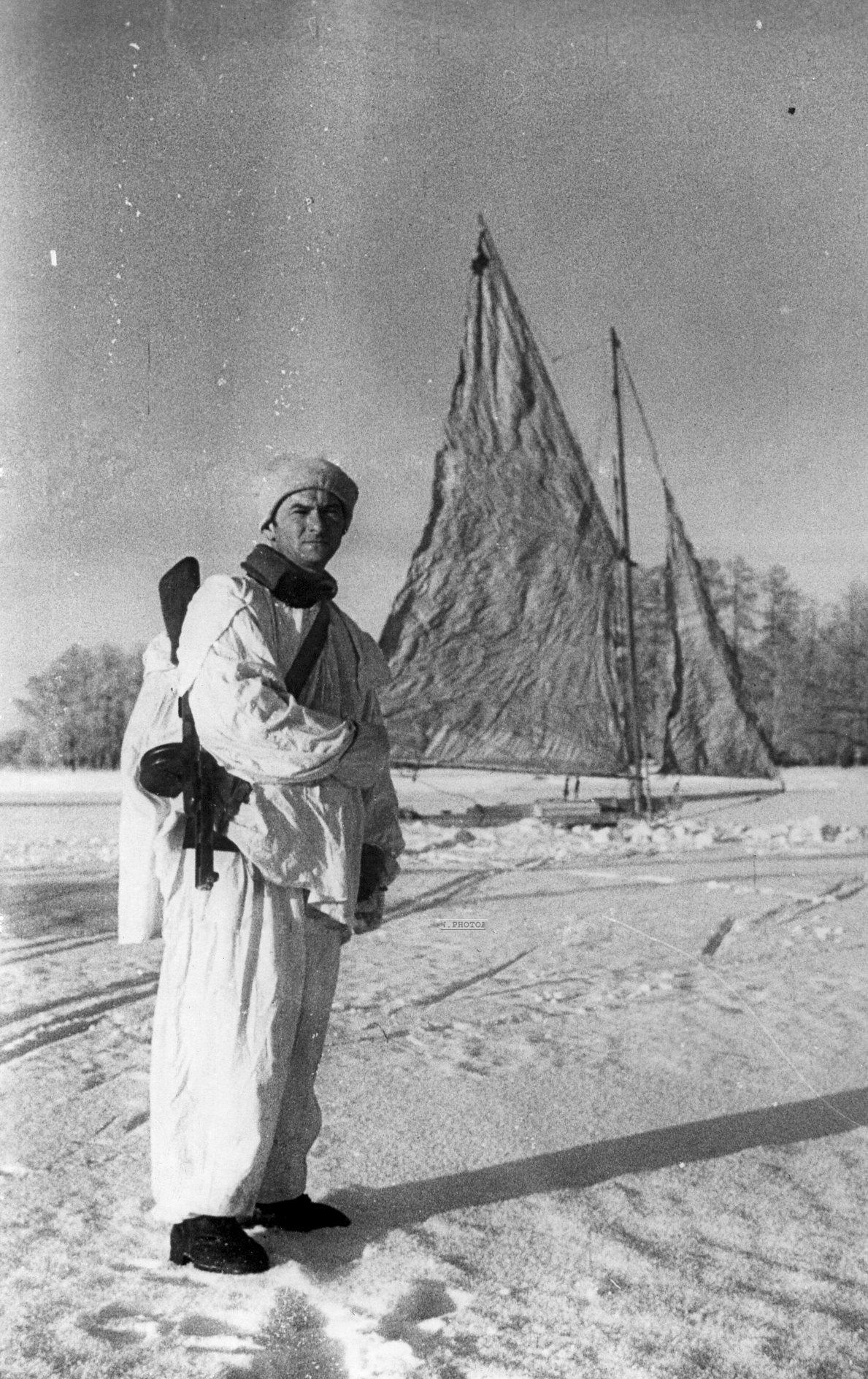
Leningrad athlete Lieutenant Sergei Gaskevich during patrol duty on an iceboat on the ice of the Gulf of Finland in December 1941.

The Masterskaya Film Company received support from the state-run Cinema Fund twice for its work on the Angels of War project, along with other organizations that announced they were producing feature films but were "not leaders in domestic film production". The Cinema Fund announced its support for the project in September 2023 and July 2024 (with additional funding).

In 2024, the production of the film, along with nine other film projects, was also supported by the St. Petersburg Committee for Culture.

In total, Angels of War received government support totaling 225 million rubles.

In preparing the film, its creators visited museums and archives, read literature, and met with veteran iceboaters who sailed the same type of iceboats used during the Great Patriotic War. Modern-day iceboaters—athletes from St. Petersburg—served as consultants for the film. With their assistance and based on the materials they studied, the film crew built a complete replica of a 1940s iceboat. Preliminary test shooting was conducted using this vessel (crewed by St. Petersburg iceboaters). Subsequently, other complete replicas of wartime iceboats were built.

=== Casting ===
By the time principal photography began, the cast had partially diverged from its initial appearance. However, Tikhon Zhiznevsky retained the lead role.

For the film, the iceboats were recreated based on the original drawings of sailing engineer Nikolai Ludewig, played by Vadim Skvirsky.

=== Filming ===
Principal photography began on February 1, 2025. They are held in Saint Petersburg and the Leningrad Oblast. According to Tikhon Zhiznevsky, they are being implemented "on a large scale".
