= Semyon Treskunov =

Russian teen actor (born 1999)

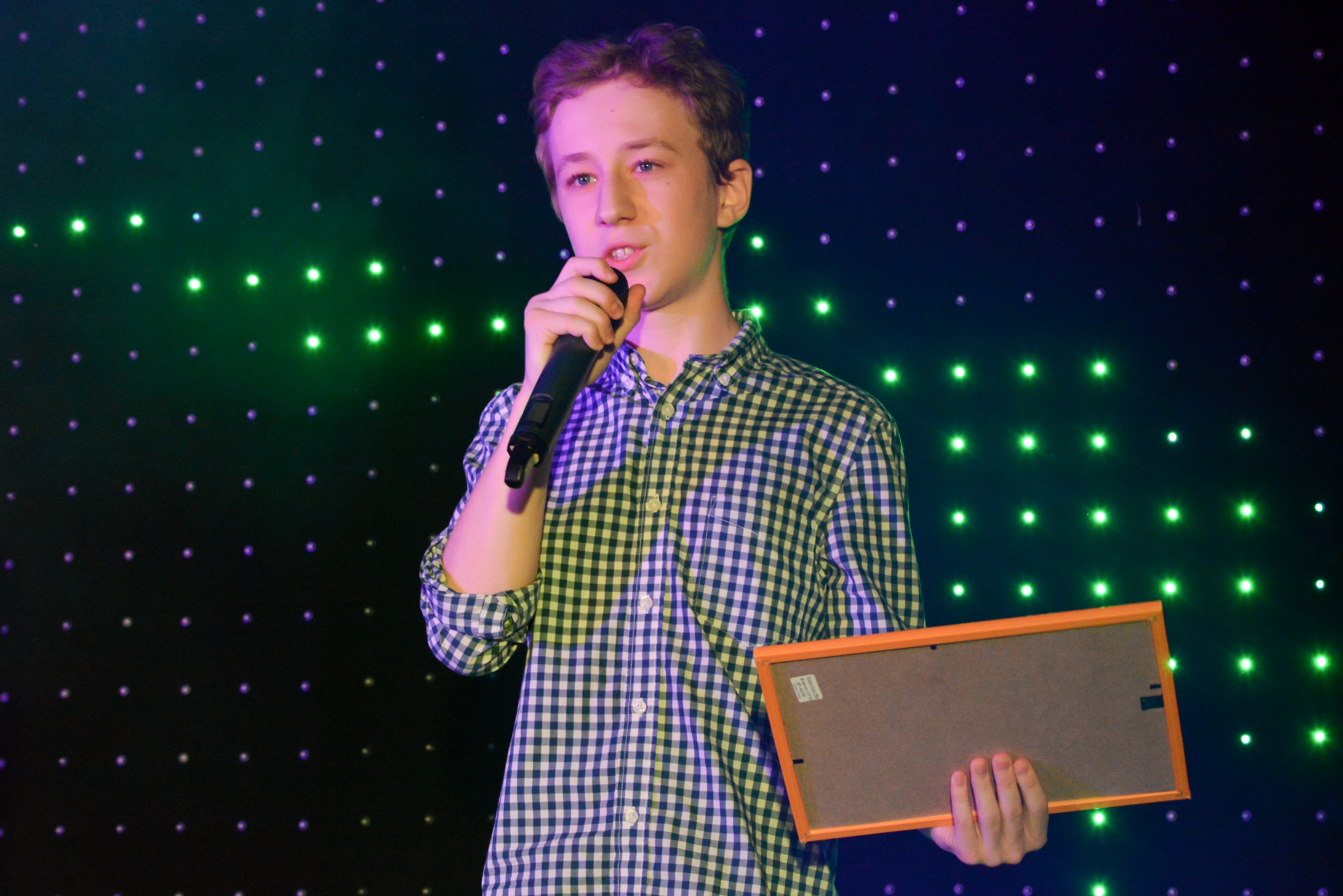
- Born: Semyon Alekseevich Treskunov; 14 November 1999 (age 26); Moscow, Russia
- Citizenship: Russia; Israel (since 2021)
- Occupation: Actor
- Years active: 2012–2021

Semyon Alekseevich Treskunov (Russian: Семён Алексе́евич Трескуно́в; born 14 November 1999) is a Russian-born Israeli actor who lives in Spain.

== Early life ==
Semyon Treskunov was born in Moscow. His mother, Marina Treskunova, is a regional representative of OWL children's magazine, and his father, Aleksey Treskunov, has his own company which does transfer graphics. At school the boy constantly participated in creative competitions, and also was fond of swimming. His parents played a great role in the choice of his career path and in the success he achieved.

== Career ==
Semyon's film debut took place in 2010. His mother took the 10-year-old Semyon for casting at MTS advertising, which he successfully passed. Before that, there was a year of vain attempts at various advertising castings. In the winter of 2011 he was offered the role of a substitute in the film State of Emergency (2012) by Vsevolod Benigsen. However, seeing Semyon, the director gave him the whole role, which was the first in his filmography. Then followed the role in the film The Night Guest (2011) by Stanislav Nazirov, where Semyon played the son of the main character Kirill.

In the summer of the same year he played in the criminal thriller Steel Butterfly (2012) by Renat Davletyarov in the small but prominent role of the homeless boy Karlik.

In the winter of 2012 came the anthology film Moms (2012), where Treskunov starred in the segment "Operatsiya Mama". Then followed a series of roles in various television series that went unnoticed. In the film I Give You My Word (2013) by Aleksandr Karpilovsky, Semyon played the main role - the pioneer Mishka Khrustalev. The picture was not successful at the big box office, but was warmly received by critics. In particular, the film itself and Semyon received many prizes at various film festivals. He also took part in the television series Traffic Light (2013–14) and Family Business (2014).

The picture directed by Vladimir Kott On the Bottom (2014), based on Maxim Gorky's eponymous play, was first shown in 2014 at the festival "Window to Europe" — in this film Semyon played Luka. The modernized adaptation got a mixed reception. The role of Semyon, did not go unnoticed and gathered mostly positive reviews.

In the summer of 2014, the shooting of the fantasy-comedy Ghost by Alexander Voitinsky was finished in Moscow, where Semyon acted opposite Fyodor Bondarchuk. The actor played the role of a "mama's boy" despised by classmates, who begins to pursue the ghost of a deceased aircraft designer. Work in this picture, released on the screens in March of next year, was recognized by film critics as a great creative achievement of Treskunov.

In 2016 the film The Good Boy was released, where Semyon played the main role. Other actors included Konstantin Khabensky and Mikhail Yefremov. The picture was praised by critics and it received the Grand Prix at the 27th Kinotavr.

== Selected filmography ==
Year	Title	Role
2011	The Night Guest	Kirill, the son of Tatiana
2012	Moms	Sasha, segment "Operatsiya "Mama"
2012	State of Emergency	Vasenka
2012	Steel Butterfly (ru)	Karlik 'Dwarf'
2013	I Give You My Word (ru)	Mishka Khrustalev
2013	Chagall - Malevich (ru)	Leva, the childhood
2014	Champions (ru)	Borya, young hockey player
2014	On the Bottom	Luka
2015	Argentina	Lyoshka Naidyonov
2015	Ghost	Vanya
2016	The Good Boy	Kolya
2017	I Give You My Word 3. Hello, adult life!	Mishka Khrustalev
2019	T-34 (film)	Vasiliy
2021	The Relatives	Sanya
2021	Russian South	Artem Dudin

=== Television ===
Year	Title	Role
2012	Mosgaz (ru)	Seryozha Tchebotar
2012	The Dark Side of the Moon	Redhead in childhood
2013	Studio 17 (ru)	Andrey
2013	Third World	Petka, the grandson of Maksim's grandfather
2013	Black cats (ru)	Romka, punks
2013-14	Traffic Light (ru)	Vanya Gurin, homeless child
2014	Family Business (ru)	Lyonya
2016	Bouncer	Artyom
2016	Sophia	Ivan Groznyy in his childhood
2017	Doctor Richter	
2017	Ivanov-Ivanov	Danila
2019	Grand	Stanislav
