= Tikhon Zhiznevsky =

Russian actor

- Тихон Жизневский
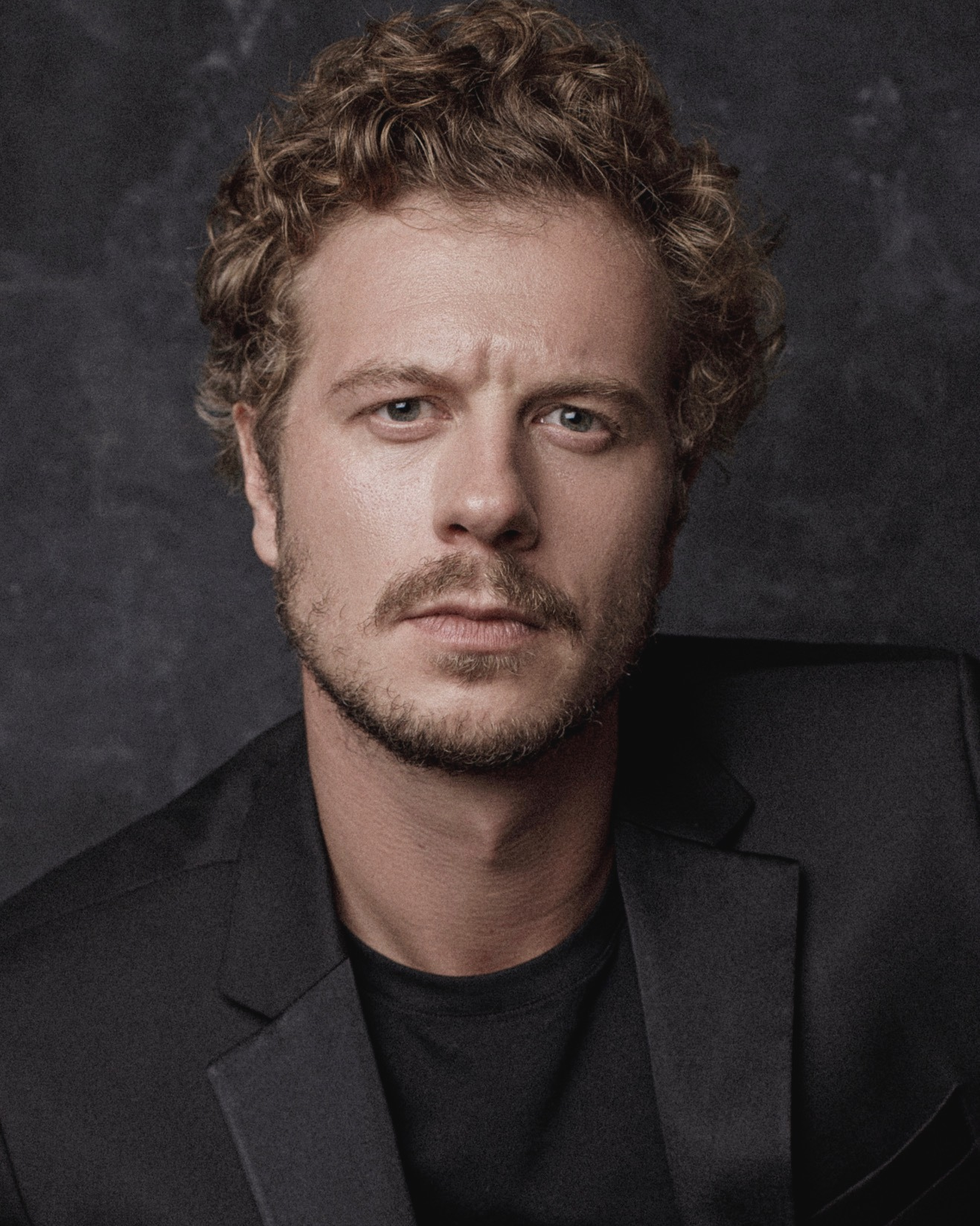
- Headshot of Tikhon Zhiznevsky
- Born: Tikhon Igorevich Zhiznevsky; August 30, 1988 (age 38); Zelenogradsk, Kaliningrad Oblast, RSFSR, USSR
- Citizenship: Russian
- Education: Alexandrinsky Theatre
- Occupation: Actor
- Years active: 2009-present
- Height: 1.91 m (6 ft 3 in)

Tikhon Igorevich Zhiznevsky (Russian: Ти́хон И́горевич Жизне́вский; born August 30, 1988) is a Russian cinematographic and theatre actor. He is mostly known for portraying the superheroic cop Igor Grom in the film Major Grom: Plague Doctor.

== Early life and education ==
Zhiznevsky was born in Zelenogradsk, Kaliningrad Oblast, Russian SFSR, Soviet Union (now Russia). In classes he studied in the theater class of the Kaliningrad Lyceum No. 49.

In 2005-2009 he studied at the Boris Shchukin Theatre Institute on the course Valery Fokin.

Since 2009, after graduating from theatrical institute, he became an actor of the Alexandrinsky Theatre in the city of Saint Petersburg.

In 2021, Zhiznevsky received the Advance Award as the best young actor according to The Hollywood Reporter Russia. The award ceremony took place within the framework of the 43rd Moscow International Film Festival.

== Selected filmography ==
List of film credits
Year	Title	Role	Notes
2006	Dikari	Vanya	
2009	Hooked on the Game		
2020	Fire	Maksim Shustov	
2021	Major Grom: Plague Doctor	Major Igor Grom	
2022	First Oscar	Ivan Maisky	
2022	Who's There?	Malinin	
2022	Raiders of the Lost Library	Ilya Arshinov	
2024	The Bremen Town Musicians	the Troubadour	
2024	A Killer's Mind	Timofey Volokh	TV series
2024	Major Grom: The Game	Major Igor Grom	
2024	Crime and Punishment	Dmitry Razumikhin	TV series
2026	Angels of War	Pavel Ukolov	
