= Raiders of the Lost Library =

- Directed by: Gleb Orlov
- Written by: Andrey Zolotarev
- Produced by: Vadim Vereshchagin; Vladimir Maslov; Natalya Shibanova; Elvira Dmitrievskaya; Ilya Burets; Vadim Sokolovsky; Murad Omarov; Binke Anisimov; Ibrahim Magomedov; Maksim Oleynikov
- Starring: Tikhon Zhiznevsky; Aleksei Serebryakov; Diana Pozharskaya; Artyom Tkachenko; Sergey Gazarov
- Cinematography: Vasily Grigolyunas
- Music by: Ryan Otter
- Production companies: Central Partnership Productions; IVI; Media Universal Event
- Distributed by: Central Partnership
- Release date: October 27, 2022
- Country: Russia
- Language: Russian
- Budget: ₽400 million
- Box office: ₽234 million

Raiders of the Lost Library (Russian: Либерея: Охотники за сокровищами, lit. 'Liberea: Treasure Hunters') is a 2022 Russian action-adventure film directed by Gleb Orlov. A film about the search for the legendary library of Ivan the Terrible. It was theatrically released on October 27, 2022, by Central Partnership.

== Plot ==
The construction of the Moscow metro turns into an unexpected find: an old book cover is pulled out from under the rubble. Its main value is by no means in gold and precious stones, with which it is generously decorated, but in the message encrypted in its drawings and inscriptions. The artifact proves that the legendary library of Ivan the Terrible also known as Liberea exists, and the map showing the way to it is right in front of you. However, the extraordinary find is forgotten for many years.

Dozens of years later, the book cover ends up in the hands of the unlucky young man Ilya Arshinov. The guy does not even suspect what he became the owner of. Powerful forces begin to hunt for Ilya Arshinov. To save himself, he has to team up with his estranged father who knows exactly how to handle the old book cover, and a philologist Arina, who is able to decipher the artifact's ciphers. Now this trinity, without looking back, embarks on a dangerous adventure in order to uncover the secret of the legendary Liberea once and for all. They will visit the most dangerous and mysterious corners of the country: from Vologda and Naryan-Mar to the Kremlin dungeons.

== Cast ==
- Tikhon Zhiznevsky as Ilya Arshinov
- Aleksei Serebryakov as Arkady
- Diana Pozharskaya as Arina Koreneva
- Artyom Tkachenko as Max
- Sergey Gazarov as Kuchevsky
- Andrey Trushin as Igor
- Pavel Gaiduchenko as Sapieha

== Production ==
The project was directed by Gleb Orlov has started filming "The Treasure of Ivan the Terrible" in Moscow, produced by the ANO "Media Universal Event", the largest film companies "Central Partnership" and the online cinema "IVI" worked on its implementation with the support of the Cinema Fund. According to the press service of the Central Partnership film company, the script for the film was written by Andrey Zolotarev.

Filming took place from October to November 2021 in Moscow. Filming locations will take place at the Kirillo-Belozersky Monastery in the town of Kirillov, Vologda Oblast near the city of Vologda, the town of Naryan-Mar, Nenets Autonomous Okrug, and the metropolitan metro in Moscow, as well as in the vicinity of the Moscow Kremlin.
