= Envelope (film) =

- Directed by: Aleksey Nuzhnyy
- Written by: Aleksey Nuzhnyy
- Starring: Kevin Spacey; Alanna Ubach; David Meunier; Anthony Skordi; Cody Caira; Mike Dirksen
- Release date: May 2, 2012 (USA)
- Country: USA
- Language: English

Envelope is a 2012 American short film directed by Aleksey Nuzhnyy and stars Kevin Spacey. It is inspired by true events of Soviet publicist and writer Yevgeny Petrov.

== Plot ==
Yevgeny Petrov, the Soviet Union writer and journalist has an unusual hobby: since the age of six, he writes fake letters to other countries. Every time, he chooses different fake names for his addresses. The envelopes come back, but beautified with colorful foreign stamps and postmarks. Throughout his lifetime, he accumulates letters from many countries worldwide, leaving only New Zealand before his collection is complete.

One day, to his shock, the envelope from New Zealand does not return, but instead a reply arrives from his made-up friend (who was not supposed to exist), even containing a photo of them, and stating that they actually spent 3 days together. Those were the days Yevgeny thought he spent in coma in a hospital. Immediately afterwards, KGB arrests Yevgeny, suspecting his seemingly harmless letters to be a secret correspondence.

Yevgeny is then sent to Moscow for interrogation, boarding an airplane. Before the plane lifts off, Petrov's wife receives the second letter from New Zealand. This reply mentions that during those 3 days, Yevgeny claimed that it was safe for him to swim, as he was destined to die on an airplane. This then happens in real life as the plane crashes.

== Cast ==
Cast	Role
Kevin Spacey	Yevgeny Petrov
Alanna Ubach	Tanya
Anthony Skordi	Pavel
David Meunier	Lieutenant
Cody Caira	Lieutenant's Assistant
Mike Dirksen	Lieutenant's Assistant
