= Sergey Burunov =

Russian actor

- Сергей Бурунов
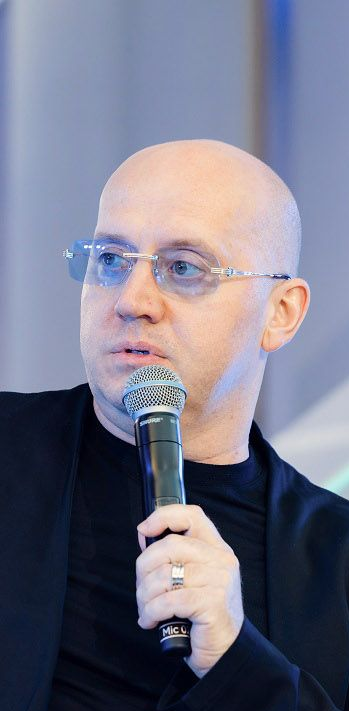
- Sergey Burunov in August 2025.
- Born: Sergey Aleksandrovich Burunov; 6 March 1977 (age 49); Moscow
- Occupations: Actor, voice actor, parodist, tv host
- Years active: 1998–present
- Awards: TEFI (2019)

Sergey Aleksandrovich Burunov (Russian: Серге́й Алекса́ндрович Буруно́в) is a Russian actor.

== Career ==
He has appeared in more than 60 films since 2002. Burunov is known for his performances in the parody TV show Big Difference and multiple works as a voice actor, especially known for being the official Russian voice of Leonardo DiCaprio (in 2004–2021), Adam Sandler (in 2008–2015) and Johnny Depp (in 2009–2018).

== Filmography ==
| Year | Title | Role | Notes |
|---|---|---|---|
| 1998 | Composition for Victory Day | passenger of the plane | |
| 2005 | My Fair Nanny | real estate agent (episode 77) | |
| 2006 | The Island | adjutant | |
| 2008 | S. S. D. | director | |
| 2009 | Help Gone Mad | burglar | |
| 2009 | Hooked on the Game | Boris | |
| 2010 | Burnt by the Sun 2: Exodus | prisoner | |
| 2011 | What Men Still Talk About | Sigmund Freud | |
| 2011 | Fairytale.Is | Geokhim | |
| 2012 | Cinderella | Boris Makarovich | |
| 2012 | The Kitchen | major of the Federal Migration Service Pyotr Lanovsky (episode 16) | |
| 2013 | Sherlock Holmes | Tom Taylor | |
| 2015 | Dukhless 2 | Major General Sergey Sergeyevich Shokhin | |
| 2015 | The Untriable | Boris Abramovich Berezovsky | |
| 2015 | Ghost | school counselor | |
| 2016 | Friday | Igor Strizhevsky | |
| 2016–2020 | Policeman from Rublyovka | lieutenant-colonel Vladimir Sergeyevich Yakovlev | |
| 2016 | The Groom | Erofeev | |
| 2017–present | The Ivanovs vs. The Ivanovs | Anton Ivanov | |
| 2017 | The Last Warrior | Vodyanoy | |
| 2017 | Life Ahead | Oleg Viktorovich | |
| 2018 | House Arrest | Deputy Mayor Pavel Osipenko | |
| 2018 | Anyone But Them | Professor Xavierov (deleted scene) | |
| 2019 | Gold Diggers | Igor Dolgachov | |
| 2021 | The Last Warrior: Root of Evil | Vodyanoy | |
| 2021 | The Relatives | Pavel Kornaukhov | |
| 2021 | Couple from the Future | Zhenya from 2040 | |
| 2021 | The Last Warrior: A Messenger of Darkness | Vodyanoy | |
| 2023 | The Boy's Word: Blood on the Asphalt | Kirill Suvorov, Vova and Marat's father | |
| 2023 | The Bremen Town Musicians | the King | |
| 2025 | Alice in Wonderland | the Caterpillar | |
| 2026 | Buratino | Healer Mantis | |

== Voice roles ==
=== Russian dubbing ===
Leonardo DiCaprio:

- 2004 – The Aviator as Howard Hughes
- 2008 – Revolutionary Road as Frank Wheeler
- 2010 – Shutter Island as Teddy Daniels
- 2012 – Django Unchained as Calvin J. Candie
- 2013 – The Great Gatsby as Jay Gatsby
- 2013 – The Wolf of Wall Street as Jordan Belfort
- 2015 – The Revenant as Hugh Glass
- 2019 – Once Upon a Time in Hollywood as Rick Dalton
- 2021 – Don't Look Up as Dr. Randall Mindy

Adam Sandler:

- 2008 – You Don't Mess with the Zohan as Zohan
- 2011 – Just Go with It as Danny Maccabee
- 2012 – Hotel Transylvania as Count "Drac" Dracula
- 2012 – That's My Boy as Donny Berger
- 2015 – Pixels as Sam Brenner
- 2015 – Hotel Transylvania 2 as Count "Drac" Dracula
- 2018 – Hotel Transylvania 3: Summer Vacation as Count "Drac" Dracula

Johnny Depp:

- 2009 – Public Enemies as John Dillinger
- 2011 – The Tourist as Frank Tupelo
- 2012 – Dark Shadows as Barnabas Collins
- 2014 – Transcendence as Will Caster
- 2015 – Black Mass as Whitey Bulger
- 2018 – Fantastic Beasts: The Crimes of Grindelwald as Gellert Grindelwald

Matthew McConaughey:

- 2003 – How to Lose a Guy in 10 Days as Benjamin Barry
- 2006 – Failure to Launch as Tripp
- 2008 – Tropic Thunder as Rick "The Pecker" Peck

Simon Pegg:

- 2007 – Hot Fuzz as Nicholas Angel
- 2011 – Paul as Graeme Willy

Channing Tatum:

- 2008 – Step Up 2: The Streets as Tyler Gage
- 2009 – G.I. Joe: The Rise of Cobra as Conrad Hauser / Duke
- 2013 – White House Down as John Cale

Steve Carell:

- 2013 – Despicable Me 2 as Gru
- 2015 – Minions as young Gru
- 2017 – Despicable Me 3 as Gru

Mark Wahlberg:

- 2014 – Transformers: Age of Extinction as Cade Yeager
- 2017 – Transformers: The Last Knight as Cade Yeager

Other films:

- 2007 – Ratatouille as Remy (Patton Oswalt)
- 2007 – Transformers as Captain William Lennox (Josh Duhamel)
- 2008 – The Incredible Hulk as Emil Blonsky (Tim Roth)
- 2010 – Hot Tub Time Machine as Adam Yates (John Cusack)
- 2011 – Gnomeo & Juliet as Paris (Stephen Merchant)
- 2012 – The Impossible as Henry (Ewan McGregor)
- 2012 – The Lorax as Aloysius O'Hare (Rob Riggle)
- 2012 – Seven Psychopaths as Billy Bickle (Sam Rockwell)
- 2013 – The Counselor as Westray (Brad Pitt)
- 2014 – The Monuments Men as Lt. James Granger (Matt Damon)
- 2014 – The Nut Job as Surly (Will Arnett)
- 2014 – Dumb and Dumber To as Lloyd Christmas (Jim Carrey)
- 2016 – The Angry Birds Movie as King Leonard Mudbeard (Bill Hader)
- 2017 – Quo Vado? as Checco Zalone (Checco Zalone)
- 2017 – The Death of Stalin as Nikita Khrushchev (Steve Buscemi)
- 2018 – Peter Rabbit as Benjamin Bunny (Colin Moody)
- 2019 – The Angry Birds Movie 2 as King Leonard Mudbeard (Bill Hader)
- 2021 – Peter Rabbit 2: The Runaway as Benjamin Bunny (Colin Moody)
- 2022 – The Amazing Maurice as Maurice (Hugh Laurie)

Video games:

- 1999 – The Longest Journey as Crow
- 2006 – Dreamfall: The Longest Journey as Crow
- 2007 – The Witcher as Jaskier
- 2008 – Lost: Via Domus as Elliott Maslow
- 2011 – The Elder Scrolls V: Skyrim as Cicero / the Black Door / Azzadal / Valdar / Wyndelius Gatharian / Headless Horseman / Garuk Windrime / the Dunmer Ghost / the Enthralled Wizard / the Ghost of Old Hroldan / the Nightingales guard / Thalin Ebonhand / the Shadow / the Mistman / Fenrig / Haknir Death-Brand / Holgeir
- 2011 – The Witcher 2: Assassins of Kings as Jaskier
- 2015 – The Witcher 3: Wild Hunt as Jaskier
- 2020 – Call of Duty: Black Ops Cold War as Dimitri Belikov / Emerson Black

=== Russian language films ===
- 2009–2013 – Mult lichnosti as Vladimir Pozner / Nikita Mikhalkov / Gennady Zyuganov / Sergey Lavrov / Dmitry Medvedev / Dick Advocaat / Viktor Yushchenko / Guus Hiddink / Stas Mikhaylov / Sergey Sobyanin / Grigory Leps / Fyodor Bondarchuk / Nicolas Sarkozy / Alexander Lukashenko / Sergey Bezrukov / Viktor Yanukovych
- 2010 – Space Dogs as the sheep dogs
- 2013 – Sherlock Holmes as Dr. Watson (Andrei Panin)
- 2014 – Kidnapping, Caucasian Style! as Shurik (Dmitrijus Šarakojis)
- 2018 – Sobibor as the narrator
- 2020 – Space Dogs: Return to Earth as Uncle Yasha
- 2020 – Horse Julius and Big Horse Racing as Sultan Rashid
- 2021 – Upon the Magic Roads as the Tsar (Mikhail Yefremov)
- 2023 – Wish of the Fairy Fish as Bayun the Cat
