= Ghost (2015 film) =

- poster
- Russian: Призрак
- Directed by: Aleksandr Voytinskiy
- Written by: Oleg Malovichko; Andrei Zolotarev
- Produced by: Sergey Selyanov; Aleksandr Voytinskiy
- Starring: Fedor Bondarchuk; Semyon Treskunov; Yan Tsapnik; Kseniya Lavrova-Glinka
- Music by: Ivan Burlyaev; Maxim Koshevarev
- Distributed by: STV; Nashe Kino; Molniya Pictures
- Release date: March 26, 2015
- Running time: 109 minutes
- Country: Russia
- Language: Russian
- Budget: RUB 150 million

Ghost (Russian: Призрак, romanized: Prizrak) is a 2015 Russian comedy film directed by Aleksandr Voytinskiy and starring Fedor Bondarchuk and Semyon Treskunov.

The film has earned about 383 million Russian rubles. This was the first Russian film to use Dolby Atmos technology.

== Plot ==
Yesterday Yuri Gordeev was an ambitious aircraft designer, a ladies' man, and on the verge of his triumph. His plane YG-1 was supposed to be a real breakthrough in domestic aviation, capable, in particular, of taking off from a 100-meter runway. But today, no one sees or hears about him, and a rival business smoothly causes Yuri's company to close. That is because Yuri drove while inebriated, got into a car accident, died and became a ghost.

Seventh grader Ivan Kuznetsov (callname - Tyulen'), or Vanya for short, was always in an empty place. A victim of an overprotective mother, the object of ridicule from classmates, he is afraid to even talk to a girl with whom he has been in love for a long time. Yuri has one week to complete his life's work and to raise his new aircraft into the air, while Vanya is the only one who can see and help him.

== Cast ==
- Fedor Bondarchuk — Yury Gordeyev
- Semyon Treskunov — Vanya Kuznetsov
- Yan Tsapnik — Gena, Yuri's best friend
- Kseniya Lavrova-Glinka — Vanya's Mother
- Igor Ugolnikov — Polzunov, Yuri's rival business
- Anna Antonova — Lena, Yuri's bride
- Anee Petrosyan — Polina
- Alexei Lukin — Stas
- Sergey Burunov — the school counselor

== Production ==
During the filming actor Yan Tsapnik broke his leg, and after this it was written into the script and was entered in the final scenes of the film.

The aircraft of YUG-1, which is designed by Yuri Gordeyev, was made entirely using the computer graphics company Main Road Post. This was because none of the most modern and highly technical counterparts could convey all the uniqueness of this aircraft.
