= Aleksey Nuzhnyy =

Russian film director, screenwriter, producer and actor

- Алексей Нужный
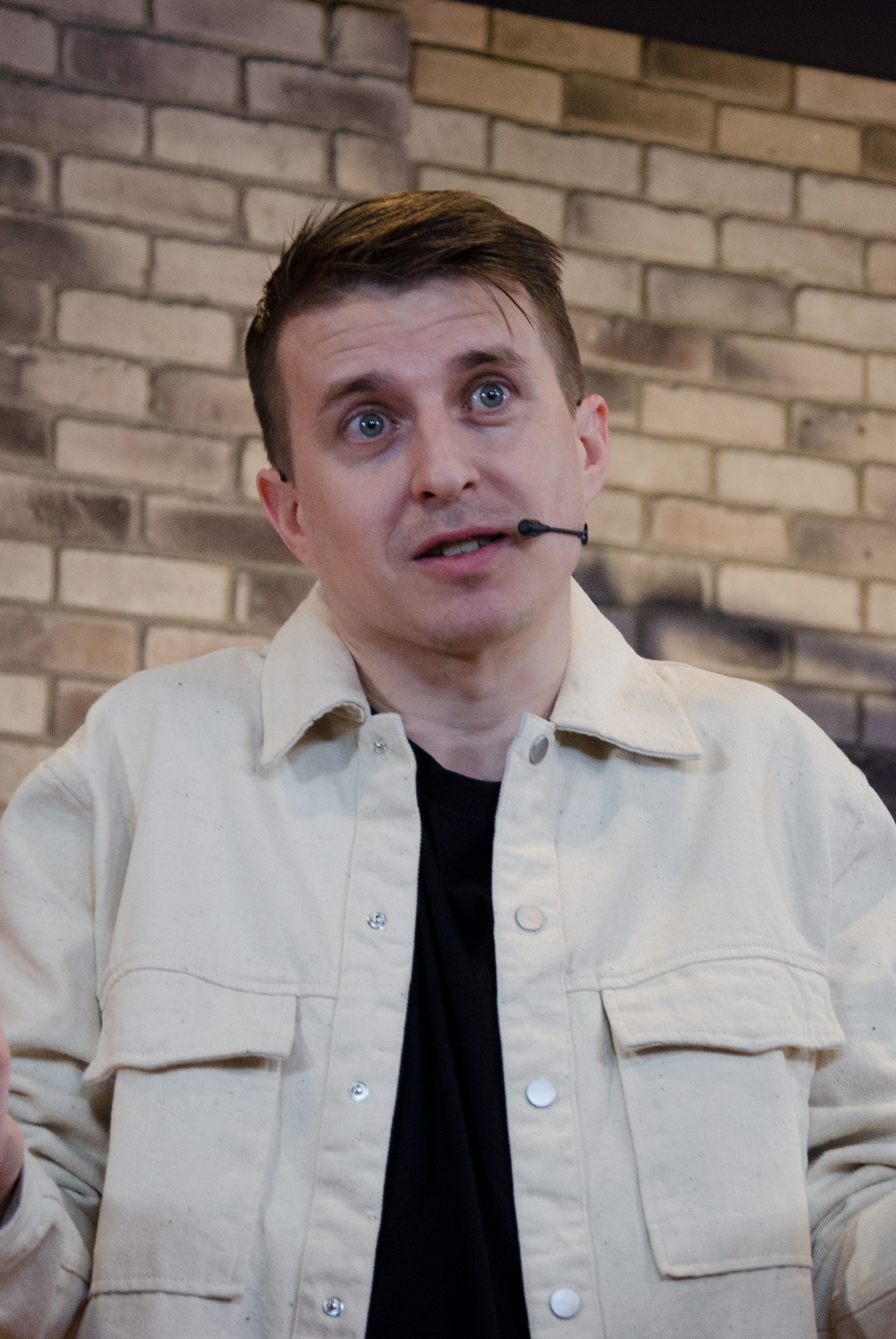
- Born: Aleksey Nikolayevich Chernomazov; 16 May 1984 (age 42); Yoshkar-Ola, RSFSR, USSR
- Citizenship: Russian Federation
- Occupations: Film director; screenwriter; producer; actor

Aleksey Nikolayevich Nuzhnyy né Chernomazov (Russian: Алексе́й Никола́евич Ну́жный; born 16 June 1984) is a Russian film director, screenwriter, producer and actor.

== Biography ==
=== Early life ===
Nuzhnyy was born in Yoshkar-Ola, Russian SFSR, Soviet Union (now Russia), studied at the New York Film Academy.

In 2012, Aleksey Nuzhnyy wrote and directed the short film Envelope with Kevin Spacey in the title role. The film The Rooster (ru), released in 2015, received the main prize of the International Street Cinema Festival (ru), the prize for the best screenplay at the Shorter Festival and the Grand Prix of the VideoLike Film Festival.

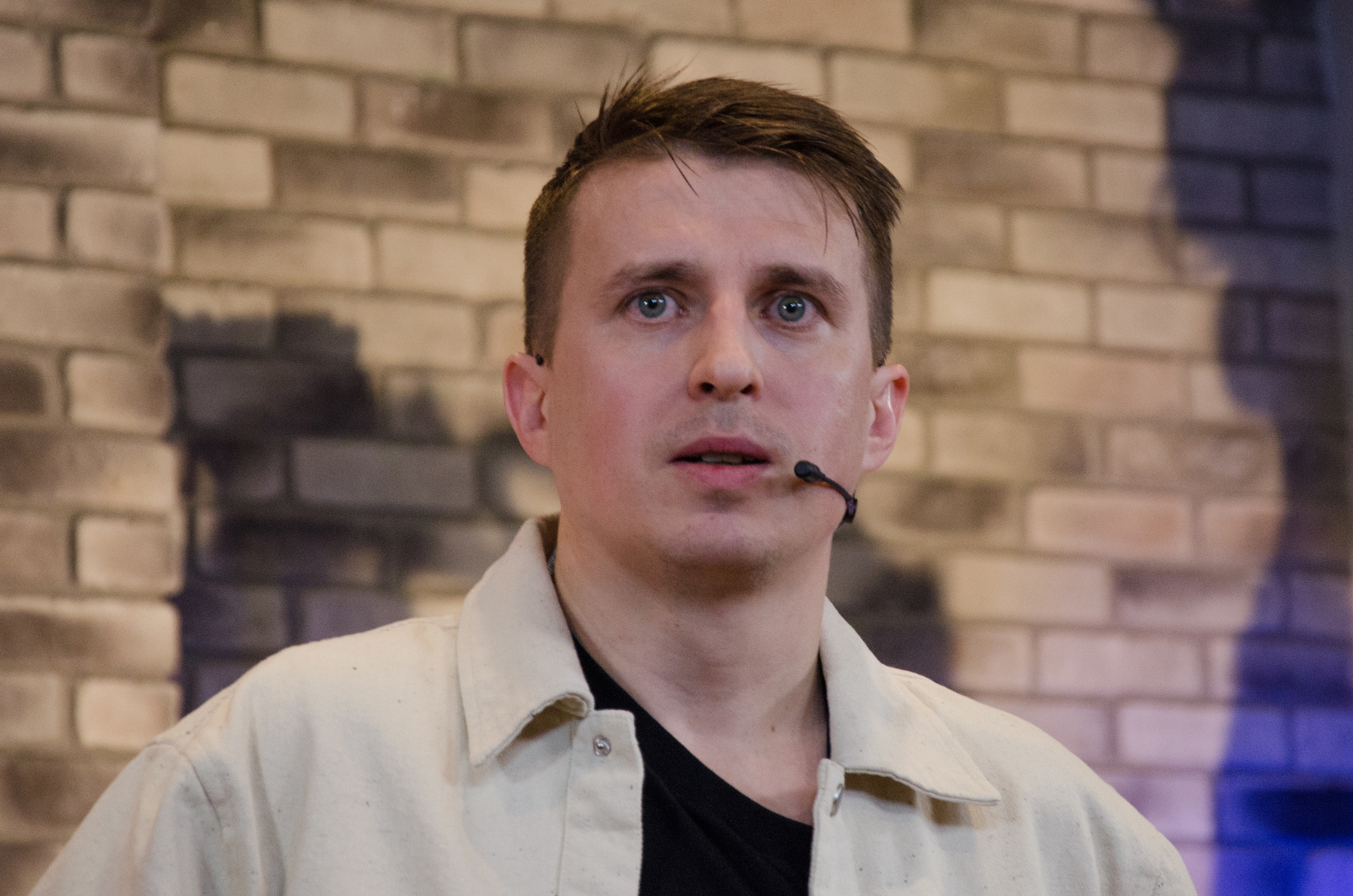
A master class by director Aleksey Nuzhnyy at the Ostankino Higher School.

== Filmography (selected) ==
- Envelope (2012)
- Yolki 6 (2017)
- I Am Losing Weight (2018)
- Loud Connection (2019)
- Obratnaya svyaz (2020)
- Fire (2020)
- Couple from the Future (2021)
- The Bremen Town Musicians (2023)
- How Ivan Found Himself in a Fairytale (2026)
