= T-34 (film) =

2019 film by Aleksei Sidorov

- Theatrical release poster
- Directed by: Aleksey Sidorov
- Written by: Aleksey Sidorov
- Produced by: Ruben Dishdishyan (ru); Anton Zlatopolskiy (ru); Len Blavatnik; Nelly Yaralova; Nikita Mikhalkov; Leonid Vereshchagin (ru); Yuliya Ivanova; Nikolay Larionov
- Starring: Alexander Petrov; Vinzenz Kiefer; Viktor Dobronravov; Irina Starshenbaum; Anton Bogdanov; Yuri Borisov; Semyon Treskunov; Artyom Bystrov
- Cinematography: Mikhail Milashin
- Edited by: Dmitry Korabelnikov
- Music by: Vadim Maevskiy; Aleksandr Turkunov; Ivan Burlyaev; Dmitriy Noskov
- Production companies: Mars Media Entertainment; AMedia; Russia-1; Studio TriTe; Cinema Fund; Mosfilm; Burnish Creative; Welldone Production
- Distributed by: Central Partnership
- Release date: January 1, 2019 (Russia)
- Running time: 139 minutes
- Country: Russia
- Language: Russian
- Budget: ₽600 million (US$10,000,000)
- Box office: ₽2 billion (US$37,410,850)

T-34 (Russian: Т-34) is a 2019 Russian war film written and directed by Aleksey Sidorov. The title references the T-34, a World War II-era Soviet medium tank used on the Eastern Front during World War II. The film narrates the life of Nikolai Ivushkin, a tank commander who gets captured by the Germans. Three years later, he begins to plan his ultimate escape, alongside his newly recruited tank crew. It stars Alexander Petrov as Junior Lieutenant Ivushkin, with Viktor Dobronravov, Irina Starshenbaum, Anton Bogdanov, Yuri Borisov, Semyon Treskunov, and Artyom Bystrov.

T-34 was released in Russia by Central Partnership on January 1, 2019. The film was released to generally positive reviews, with critics praising the production quality and visual effects. It was successful commercially, grossing 2.2 billion rubles (about $32 million) against a production budget of 600 million rubles, after a week in cinemas. It is in second place on Russia's biggest blockbusters list with over 8.5 million viewers and 2 billion rubles, and is currently the tenth-highest grossing Russian film of all time.

Russian TV Channel Russia-1 has broadcast it every year since release on Victory Day.

== Plot ==
In November 1941 on the Eastern Front of World War II, Red Army Junior Lieutenant Nikolai Ivushkin is assigned to command a damaged T-34-76 tank whose commander was killed. His orders are to delay the Germans' advance the defense of the Soviet Union with only one tank and supporting infantry. Nikolai and his crew lay an ambush for a platoon of German panzers commanded by Heer Hauptmann (Captain) Klaus Jäger. They destroy six panzers, but in a final duel with Jäger's command vehicle, both tanks are disabled, Nikolai and driver Stepan Vasilyonok are captured and the rest of the crew is killed.

In 1944, Jäger, now a Standartenführer (SS-Colonel), receives permission from Reichsführer-SS Heinrich Himmler and Heer General Heinz Guderian to recruit an experienced tank crew from Soviet POWs in a concentration camp to act as opponents for training the 12th SS Panzer Division Hitlerjugend. Jäger selects Nikolai through the camp's interpreter, a female prisoner named Anya. When Nikolai refuses, Jäger threatens to kill Anya and he agrees. By suggesting it as a means of escape, he convinces three prisoners to become his crew: driver Vasilyonok, loader Serafim Ionov, and gunner Demyan Volchok. Their first task is to clean the dead crew from a newly captured T-34-85. They unexpectedly find live shells and hand grenades in a hidden reserve rack. While burying the previous crew, they hide the munitions in a cairn on the edge of the training ground. When Jäger orders anti-tank mines laid throughout the training ground, Anya provides Nikolai with a stolen map of the minefield and convinces Nikolai to let her escape with them.

Nikolai and his crew retrieve the munitions before the training exercise, and create a smoke screen to mask their movements. Their first armour-piercing shell knocks out a Panther tank, and they blow up the observation tower, killing most of the occupants. The T-34 storms through the car park, crushing staff cars and breaking through the main gate. They pick up Anya at a bus stop outside the camp and head for Czechoslovakia and the Red Army's lines. They escape an encounter with an anti-tank gun with only a dented turret.

As night falls Nikolai suggests abandoning the tank and splitting up. The crew insists on staying together with the tank. Hearing German vehicles before dawn, Nikolai sends Anya away on foot and plans to meet her further east. Jäger tries to spot the T-34 from a Fieseler Storch plane, then prepares an ambush with four Panthers in Klingenthal. When the T-34 reaches the town, it disables the first Panther by skipping solid shot into its underbelly. Surrounded by the other three German tanks, Volchok disables one with a grenade. Vasilyonok crashes the T-34 through a building, flanking another Panther and killing it with a point-blank shot. The resulting explosion stuns the T-34 crew and another Panther takes aim. Volchok fires the gun of the German tank he captured disabling the third Panther but Jäger returns fire and Volchok is badly wounded.

Jäger and Nikolai emerge from the cupolas of their tanks, and Jäger throws down his glove, inviting Nikolai to a duel. They face off outside the town over a narrow stone bridge and both tanks are heavily damaged. The T-34 rams Jäger's tank toward the bridge's edge. The commanders disembark to duel with pistols, and Nikolai spares Jäger. They shake hands, but when Nikolai tries to pull Jäger to safety, Jager refuses capture, instead committing suicide by allowing himself to fall from the bridge, with his tank landing on him afterwards.

Abandoning their T-34, the crew reunites with Anya they carry the wounded Volchok towards the Russian lines.

The film ends with a dedication to the Red Army tank crews of the Great Patriotic War.

== Cast ==
- Alexander Petrov as Junior Lieutenant Nikolay Ivushkin, tank officer in the Red Army
- Vinzenz Kiefer as SS-Standartenführer Klaus Jäger SS-Officer former Heer Officer with the rank of Hauptmann in the Wehrmacht
- Viktor Dobronravov as Sergeant Stepan Vasilyonok, tank driver
- Irina Starshenbaum as Anya Yartseva, a translator in a concentration camp
- Yuri Borisov as Serafim Ionov, loader of the T-34-85 (1944)
- Anton Bogdanov as Demyan Volchkov "Volchok", tank gunner (1944)
- Artur Sopelnik as Red Army man Ivan Kobzarenko, loader of the T-34-76 (1941)
- Pyotr Skvortsov as Andrey Lykov, machine gunner (1941)
- Semyon Treskunov as Red Army man Vasiliy Teterin "Teterya", lorry driver
- Guram Bablishvili as Starshina Guram Gabuliya, commander of the infantry squad
- Danila Rassomakhin as Vasechkin
- Artyom Bystrov as Captain Mikhail Korin
- Wolfgang Cerny as Wolf Hein, tank sniper
- Dirc Simpson as Grimm, the camp commandant
- Joshua Grothe as Thielicke

=== Rest of cast listed alphabetically ===
- Mike Davies as Generalinspekteur der Panzertruppe Heinz Guderian
- Igor Khripunov as Lapikov
- Robinson Reichel as Reichsführer-SS Heinrich Himmler
- Yaroslav Shtefanov as Makeev, machine-gunner
- Anton Shurtsov as Chief of staff
- Christoph Urban as Schlozer
- Alexandr Zaporozhets as Petya
- Elena Drobysheva as Nikolay Ivushkin's mother

== Production ==
=== Development ===
On September 10, 2015, it was announced that the Mars Media film company would start production of the high-budget war action drama T-34. Later, producer Leonard Blavatnik, an investor, owner of Amedia and Warner Music Studios, joined the project and chose this film from a large number of proposals, which was also due to personal motives (as Blavatnik's grandfather was a Red Army soldier) and other reasons - the best young artists, a first-class film crew and the successful experience of a partner, Mars Media, and personally Ruben Dishdishyan.

=== Filming ===
The shooting process of T-34 started on 23 February and continued for 61 days. Some scenes were shot in Moscow, Kaluga and Moscow regions, others in the Czech Republic, Prague, Kačina (library), Loket, Rudolfinum and Terezín. For the picture, more than 25 scale sceneries were built, among them a Russian village and a prisoner of war camp.

Five military-historical consultants took part in the making of the film.

=== Pre-production ===
In the film, several real T-34 tanks were remade and updated for the film. The film also used several German and Soviet vehicles, such as the Sd.Kfz. 251 half-track. The Panther tanks with Zimmerit paste were made from T-55 tanks distinguishable by the five large roadwheels.

Production designer Konstantin Pagutin spent a whole month building an entire village in a field near the village of Starlkowka, Kluj County, although the houses were destroyed at the beginning of the film, each one was designed in its own particular style, including hand-picked decorations and props.

== Release ==
The film was scheduled to be released on December 27, 2018, in cinemas, but instead the picture was released on January 1, 2019, five days later than the planned date. Central Partnership hired a conversion to IMAX format.

=== Marketing ===
T-34 premiered at Comic-Con Russia 2018, the most attended Russian festival of pop culture, which took place in Moscow from 4 to 7 in October and once again beat attendance records, was held by the Central Partnership company.

== Reception ==
=== Box office ===
On the first day of release, the Russian box office amounted to 111,335,337 rubles.

=== Call for censorship ===
The Ukrainian Embassy in the U.S. called on local American cinemas to ban the film because they saw it as justifying and promoting Moscow’s hostile foreign and security policy.

=== Critical response ===
The film received mixed reviews. On the review aggregator Kritikanstvo, it holds a rating of 5.5/10 based on 26 reviews.

Some publications after the release of the trailer and the premiere of the film wrote about the similarity of the story with the plot of the 1965 Soviet war film The Lark, noting that T-34 cannot be considered a remake of The Lark: both the method of presentation and the general outline of the narrative, and the ending of these two films are very different.

According to film critic Anton Dolin, the authors made a high-budget military blockbuster, almost clearing it of the propaganda and ideological component: "This film about the Great Patriotic War successfully managed to avoid patriotic propaganda". The creators do not pretend that the T-34 is a picture of real events, at its core it is "a pure fantasy adapted for teenagers". The critic notes the schematic plot and the weak development of the characters. "This is exemplary fearlessness, this programmatic heroism is a little embarrassing. At first, you don’t understand in what way. And then you remember what T-34 is building up its genealogy for: Soviet films about the war. In the best of them, the adversaries were not the Germans, as here, but the war as such. In Fate of a Man, Ivan's Childhood, The Cranes Are Flying, Ballad of a Soldier, and Trial on the Road, for all the differences, there was one conceptual similarity: they showed how a person retains his humanity through the desire for peace and memory about him. The universe of T-34 is arranged in a fundamentally different way. It is given to a total never-ending war in which comforting simplicity reigns: there are our guys, there are the enemies, and the enemies must be beaten to a victorious end. There is no pain and bitterness, instead only excitement and frenzy of gamers at a video-game championship".

Novaya Gazeta critic Larisa Malyukova reflected on the role of tanks in modern Russian cinema; Sidorov took into account the shortcomings of the "tank" films of 2018 Tankers and Tanks (ru) - "In his picture, the propaganda itch was partly tamed by uncomplicated adventures and vigorous battles, seasoned with humor, and reddened by love bliss". Like Dolin, Malyukova compares the picture with Soviet films on a military theme: "In those films, the Faulkner idea was beating with a living pulse: one cannot come from a war as a winner. They were aware of the global catastrophe, which was for our people the Second World War. In the latest domestic movie war, one cannot find the author's point of view. Instead of resorting to myth, there is mythologization of history. Instead of the anti-war spirit - the motto is “We can repeat it!”, a call to achievement. Instead of a brutal clever enemy we see complete idiots. The romanticization of war, the feeling of the ease of victory covers the screen".

The critic Valery Kichin wrote in Rossiyskaya Gazeta that one cannot form an idea of what the Great Patriotic War is in reality: "According to the plot, this is a legend like Bumbarash or The Elusive Avengers, restyled as a script for a computer game called T-34. That is, the spectacles are primarily effective and exciting. The dashing adventurous plot, the conditional situation of the action, the peculiar beauty even in the process of destruction. Yes, this is a movie about the feat of arms of the very folk hero who, as you know, rides, rides, doesn't whistle, but doesn’t let go. And the authors, undoubtedly, were inspired by the style of the adventure game: they use game techniques that are well-known to the modern viewer, and the wonderful feeling that the characters have several lives accompanies the entire film. And the actors here are not so much acting as playing: at the moments of the most implausible plot somersaults, a sly spark of cheerful excitement slips in their eyes. This sincerity removes all claims: people who went through a real front filmed military classics, now people with combat experience in video-games have come, they have different skills and ideas about the war".

Evgeny Bazhenov, a YouTube video blogger and reviewer of Russian films, (known by his pseudonym BadComedian) criticized the film in his video review. He argued the film was historically unreliable and justified Nazism, concentration camps in the film are shown harmless, and SS Klaus is shown as almost a positive character, which offends the memory of the heroes of the Great Patriotic War than perpetuates it.

=== Accolades ===
Award	Date of ceremony	Category	Recipient(s)	Result
Golden Eagle Award	January 24, 2020			
Golden Eagle Award	January 24, 2020	Best Motion Picture	Aleksey Sidorov, Anton Zlatopolskiy, Ruben Dishdishyan, Len Blavatnik, Leonid Vereshchagin and Nikita Mikhalkov	Nominated
Golden Eagle Award	January 24, 2020	Best Director	Aleksey Sidorov	Won
Golden Eagle Award	January 24, 2020	Best Adapted Screenplay	Aleksey Sidorov	Won
Golden Eagle Award	January 24, 2020	Best Leading Actor	Alexander Petrov	Nominated
Golden Eagle Award	January 24, 2020	Best Leading Actress	Irina Starshenbaum	Nominated
Golden Eagle Award	January 24, 2020	Best Supporting Actor	Viktor Dobronravov	Nominated
Golden Eagle Award	January 24, 2020	Best Cinematography	Mikhail Milashin	Nominated
Golden Eagle Award	January 24, 2020	Best Sets and Decorations	Konstantin Pakhotin	Nominated
Golden Eagle Award	January 24, 2020	Best Costume Design	Ulyana Polyanskaya	Nominated
Golden Eagle Award	January 24, 2020	Best Film Editing	Dmitry Korabelnikov	Nominated
Golden Eagle Award	January 24, 2020	Best Sound Engineer	Aleksey Samodelko	Nominated
Golden Eagle Award	January 24, 2020	Best Visual Effects	Algus Studio	Won

== See also ==
- The Lark (1965 film), a Soviet film about a T-34 tank and its crew who escape from a German training ground
- White Tiger (2012 film)
- Fury (2014 film) an American film about a Sherman tank crew
