= Aerial Forest Protection Service (Russia) =

Russian government agency

- Центральная база авиационной охраны лесов „Авиалесоохрана“»

Agency overview
- Formed: 18 March 1958; 68 years ago
- Headquarters: Ulitsa Gor'kogo, 20, Pushkino, Pushkinsky District, Moscow Oblast, 141200 Russia
- Parent agency: Federal Agency for Forestry
- Website: aviales.ru

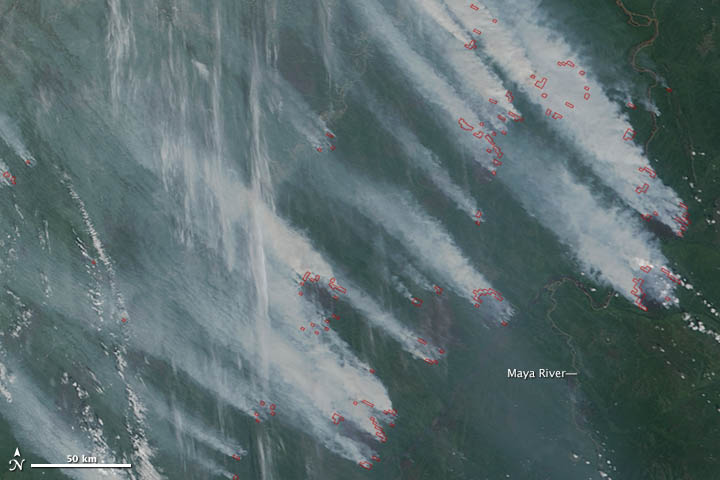
Satellite image of a forest fire in Russia

The Aerial Forest Protection Service (Russian: Федеральное бюджетное учреждение «Центральная база авиационной охраны лесов „Авиалесоохрана“», or in its acronym Авиалесоохрана, or Avialesookhrana) is a Russian government agency charged primarily with the aerial management of forest fires. It is considered a branch of the Russian Federal Forest Service. It is famous for the creation and use of smoke jumpers; paratroopers who drop using parachutes down into villages in the path of the fire to warn residents and to provide them with help in evacuation procedures. Smoke jumpers also jump directly into forest fires to help the officials in extinguishing the fires. Until 2007, the Avialesookhrana was the only Russian organization charged with handling forest fires. They are also credited with helping the Republic of Mongolia and Cuba create their own forest-fire prevention agencies.

== History ==
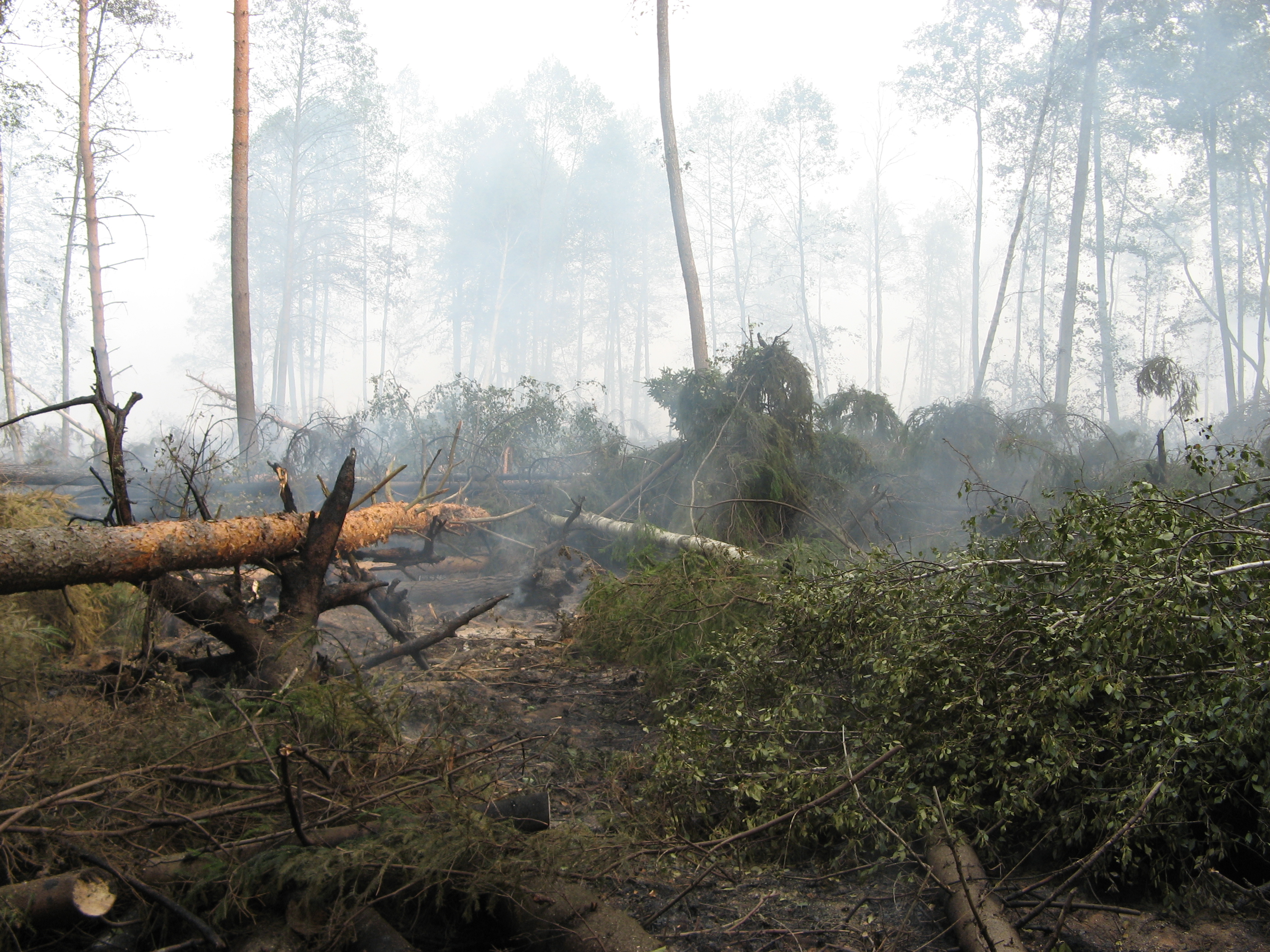
Forest fire near Roshal town 13 August 2010

On 7 July 1931, using the U-2 (BY-2) plane, the first aviation expedition of the Avielesookhrana to fight forest fires in the Nizhny Novgorod region was launched from a station in Uren; this was the first flight in which the U-2 (BY-2) plane had been used to detect a forest fire. The expedition was headed by G. G. Samoilovich of the Lesoaviatsionnoy (Forest Aviation) section of the Leningrad Forestry Research Institute, along with employees S. P. Rumyantsev, G. Stadnitskii, and V. Antipin. One year later in 1932, under the guidance of M. Simsk, the agency conducted experiments in the Shatura district of the Moscow region using chemical bombs to combat forest fires from the air; this was the first use of Aerosil drops. In 1934 the agency published a guide on protecting forests from wildfires, compiled by S. P. Rumyantsev; it included the advantages of an aerial wildfire defense, Rumyantsev's administrative process, and instructions on cartography, communication, airfields, etc. The first experiments in using explosives to combat wildfires were undertaken that same year under the direction of P. P. Serebrennikov of TSNIILH (now the All-Russian Research Institute for Silviculture and Mechanization of Forestry) in the Yegoryevsk district of the Moscow region.

The Avialesookhrana first began experimenting with paratroopers in 1934 under the direction of G. A. Mokeeva. Initially, these smokejumpers landed in populated areas to alert local communities, and mobilize local fire-fighting services to combat the wildfires; these experiments were very successful.

The agency replaced their outdated PO-2 and W-2 aircraft with the multipurpose An-2 in 1952, and have used it since. This new plane allowed the Avialesookhrana to carry both smokejumpers and aerial fire-retardants in the same craft, significantly reducing the time it took to effectively suppress a wildfire.

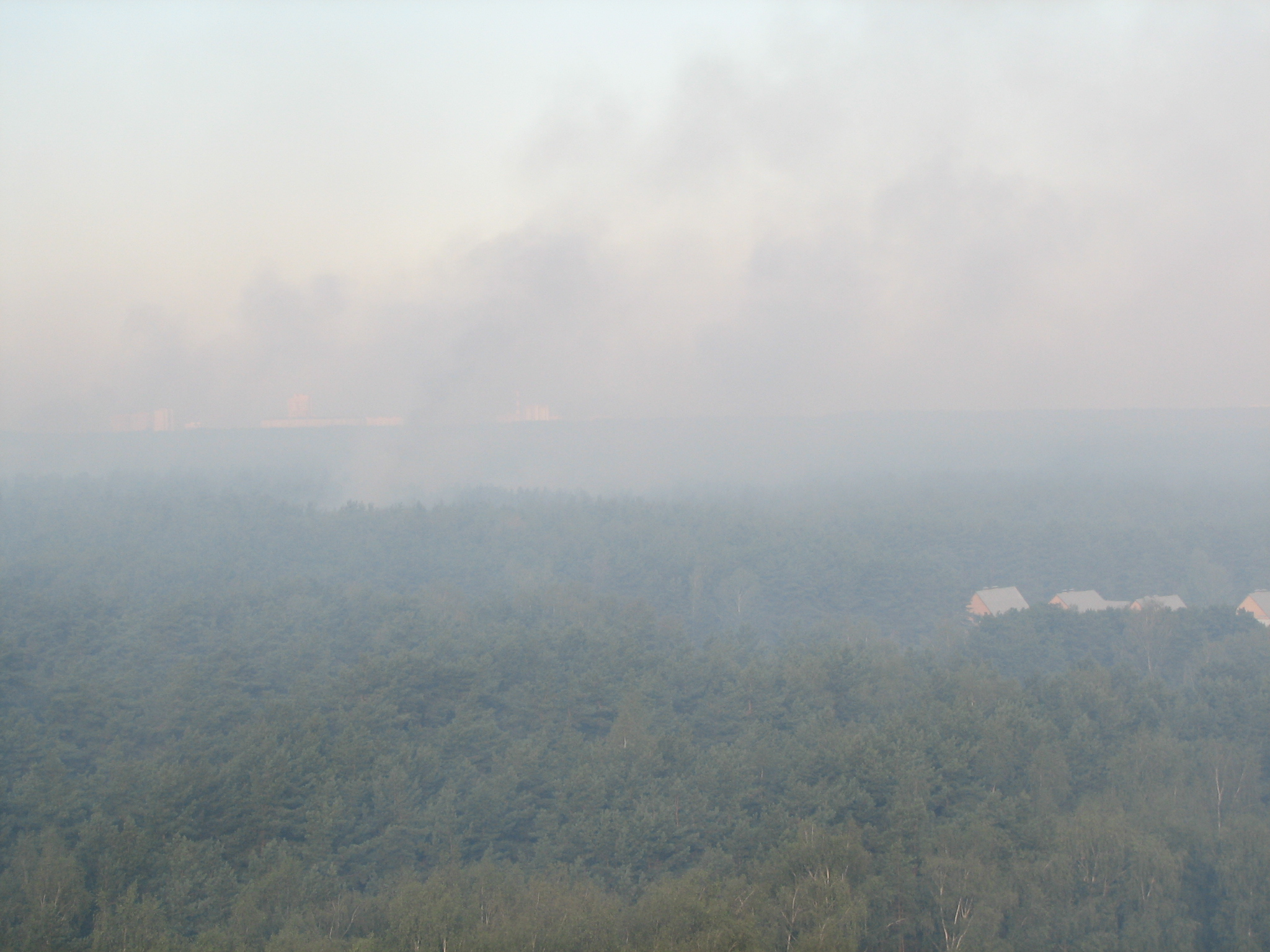
Ostrovtsy forest fires 2010

From 16 to 24 August 1954, in Zagorsk, the first successful tests using the Mi-4 helicopter to perform the maintenance tasks of forestry were conducted. During the tests, Mi-4 helicopters were used to patrol the forests and flown to forest fires. This resulted in a new professional category: "commando-fire".

On 18 March 1958, the governing body for all of the data collected by the aerial surveillance of the forests (the Far East, Transbaikal, Western Siberia, West of the Urals, Irkutsk, Krasnoyarsk, Primorsky, North, Urals, Yakutia) was established at a central air base. On July 1, 1959, this central base was transferred to the General Directorate of Forestry and Forest Protection of the Council of Ministers of the RSFSR. the total protected area was 547 million hectares.

22 June 1962 saw the completion of tests of a special release mechanism drum (SS-B) for dropping material from a helicopter hovering over the clearings in the forest, making it possible to deliver people and supplies directly to the edge of a forest fire. In 1978 an engineer for Science and Technology Laboratory, N. Pushkarev, developed the descender roller (SS-P), which is more secure. A further development from this, the SU-P, is in use today.

In 2005, a system was developed and put in place for the remote monitoring of forest fires by the Federal Forestry Agency (FFA-ISDM). Work on the creation of this system was carried out by a consortium of institutes of the Russian Academy of Sciences, Forestry Agency, RosHydromet and other organizations with the participation of Avialesookhrana. The system ISDM-FFA operates on a national scale in real time using satellite data and GPS technologies to create daily reporting and decision-making.

In 2007, the forest protection air bases – branches of FGU "Avialesookhrana" – were eliminated. Instead, they have been reorganized as specialized state budgetary or autonomous agencies, subordinate to the executive authorities of the Russian Federation.

== Functions ==
Under the provisions of the Forest Code (federal law on 4 December 2006), FGU "Avialesookhrana" is responsible for:

- Monitoring fire danger and consequences of fires.
- Participation in monitoring the use of public authorities of the Russian Federation delegated powers in the field of forest relations.
- Evaluating the effectiveness of the use of subsidies allocated to the subjects of the Russian Federation to carry out the delegated powers in terms of forest fire protection.
- Forest fire monitoring forest in the Moscow region.
- Training and retraining of specialists in the field of monitoring and protection of forests.

== Department heads ==
- Nikolai Danilin: 18-03-1958 – 30-05-1960
- Viacheslav Podolski: 06-01-1960 – 05-03-1978
- Nikolai Andreev: 04-05-1978 – 02-10-2000
- Nikolai Kovalev: 02-10-2000 – December 2011
- Andrey Kalinin: December 2011 – July 2015
- Vladimir Grishin: July 2015 to present
