= I Am Losing Weight =

2018 Russian sports comedy film

- Theatrical release poster
- Directed by: Aleksey Nuzhnyy
- Screenplay by: Nikolay Kulikov; Alexey Nuzhny; Konstantin Mayer
- Produced by: Sergey Kornikhin; Nikolay Kulikov; Aleksey Nuzhnyy; Alena Kremer; Ekaterina Kononenko; Ilya Naishuller
- Starring: Aleksandra Bortich; Irina Gorbacheva; Yevgeny Kulik; Roman Kurtsyn; Sergey Shnurov
- Cinematography: Kirill Klepalov; Evgeny Kolskiy
- Edited by: Avet Oganesnyan
- Music by: Dmitriy Lanskoy; Dmitriy Emelyanov
- Production companies: Droog Drooga; Versus Pictures
- Distributed by: Universal Pictures International (UPI)
- Release date: March 8, 2018 (Russia)
- Running time: 102 minutes
- Country: Russia
- Language: Russian
- Budget: $1.7 million ₽87 million
- Box office: $10 million ₽633 million

I Am Losing Weight (Note: Released as I’m Losing It on English-speaking markets.) (Russian: Я худею, romanized: Ya khudeyu) is a 2018 Russian sports comedy film directed by Aleksey Nuzhnyy. The film stars Aleksandra Bortich, Irina Gorbacheva, Yevgeny Kulik and Roman Kurtsyn.

The premiere of the film in Russia took place on March 8, 2018, the gross for the first day of the rental amounted to 1.9 million dollars - as of mid-March this was the best achievement among Russian films of 2018, and for the first four days - up to 5.8 million dollars, which brought the film to the ninth place of the weekly ranking.

== Plot ==
The action takes place in Nizhny Novgorod. Anya Kulikova only loves food and her boyfriend - athlete Zhenya. But Zhenya is not pleased with Anya because she has put on a lot of weight and he decides to leave her. But Anya does not give up and sets a goal to get rid of excess weight. And Kolya Barabanov is there to help her, an overweight man obsessed with the healthy way of living.

== Cast ==
- Aleksandra Bortich as Anna "Anya" Kulikova
- Irina Gorbacheva as Natalia "Natasha"
- Yevgeny Kulik as Nikolai "Kolya" Barabanov
- Roman Kurtsyn as Yevgeny "Zhenya ", coach for swimming
- Yelena Valyushkina as Olga, Anya's mom
- Mikhail Orlov as Semyon, friend of Olga
- Sergey Shnurov as Sergey Kulikov, Anya's father
- Anna Kotova as Diana, Sergey's wife
- Alexander Ptashenchuk as Dimas, Natasha's husband, DJ
- Valeria Dergileva as Christina
- Andrey Trushin as fitness instructor
- Oleg Kassin as Grisha, combine operator
- Anna Ichetokina as laughing woman
- Alena Ermolaeva as Alena

== Production ==
Aleksandra Bortich had to gain and lose 20 kg over the course of the making of the film.

The authors of the film offered the main role to Irina Gorbacheva, but she did not want to gain weight.

Producer Ilya Naishuller played a smoked guest at a party - for this, he spent the whole shooting day on the couch with a blurred look and a bong in his hands.

Before starting work on the film, director Aleksey Nuzhnyy and screenwriter Nikolay Kulikov lost 28 and 20 kg, respectively.

Work on the script went on for two and a half years. During this time, the authors interviewed a large number of girls and women who are concerned about the topic of losing weight, so that everything in the film is as truthful as possible. There were 17 draft scripts in total.

=== Filming ===
The filming period was divided into two blocks. In the first block - May and June 2017 - Aleksandra Bortich was shot in full. After that, there was a break when Aleksandra Bortich switched to strict nutrition and trained 7 days a week. For a month and a half she lost weight and filming resumed.

Aleksandra Bortich herself performed many tricks in the film: she climbed from the balcony to the balcony on the eighth floor, jumped from the pier into the water at a temperature of less than 10 degrees, ran out of the burning bath in a burning sheet.

=== Criticism ===
According to film critic Anton Dolin (ru), despite the predictable plot, overkill with views of the city to pop music and the not very appropriate role of Sergey Shnurov, all the "shortcomings are fully paid for by the merits" of the film.

== Release ==
The film was released in the Russian Federation by Universal Pictures International on March 8, 2018.

== Reception ==
The film received mostly positive reviews, acting of Bortich and the script received praise.

=== Box office ===
The fees for the first day of rental amounted to 110 million rubles - as of mid-March this is the best achievement among Russian films in 2018, and for the first four days - up to 331 million rubles ($5.8 million), which brought the film to the ninth place of the weekly world rating. By early August, total fees exceeded 630 million rubles ($10 million).
