= Preschool teacher =

Person who is employed to teach preschool-aged children

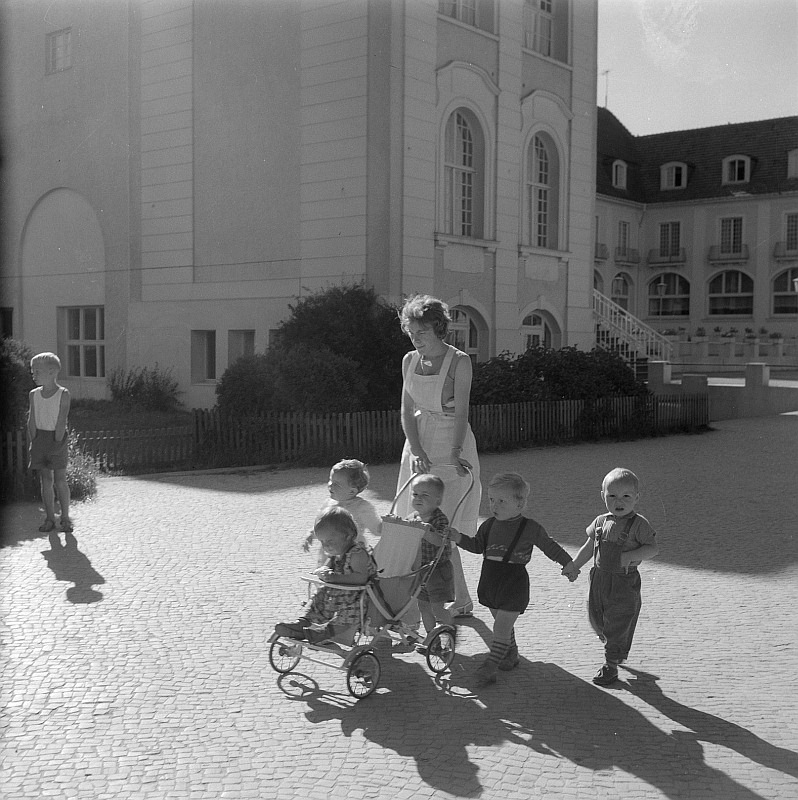

Description
- Competencies: Child development, classroom management, lesson planning, communication, observation, first aid
- Education required: Varies by jurisdiction; typically a certificate, diploma, or degree in early childhood education
- Fields of employment: Preschools, nursery schools, childcare centres, kindergartens, early learning programs
- Related jobs: Kindergarten teacher, childcare worker, teaching assistant, special education teacher

In early childhood education, a preschool teacher is an educator who works with children younger than 5 years old (before kindergarten). Some provide a 10-month school year program, while others provide a full year.

A preschool teacher provides daytime childcare for children under 5 years old, focusing on play-based learning and early childhood development. Childcare and after-school programs vary, and are offered within unlicensed childcare centres, licensed childcare centres, or home-based facilities. Attendance for children in preschool is not mandated as it is not a publicly funded educational program accessible to all. There are costs involved and usually sought after by working parents until the child reaches school age.

Some jurisdictions have implemented an Act aimed towards regulating childcare and bring cohesiveness to the field of childcare. Legislation provides a framework for the regulation of child care programs, including training requirements for staff, health and safety standards, staff-child ratios, space requirements, nutritional standards, and access to outdoors.

Preschool teachers ensure the safety of the children in their care while creating a nurturing setting for children to develop their cognitive, social and emotional skills. Childcare settings also provide routines and structure in preparation for children’s future academic success once children age out of day-time child care and enter the elementary education system, either publicly funded or a private system.

Licensing and qualifications for preschool teachers vary based on regions/countries. It is recommended (but not mandated) for preschool teachers to have post-secondary education (preferably in early years development). Some programs are accredited from a regulated and approved Institution while others are from private sector educational institutions.

Dependent upon the legislation in geographical areas, preschool teachers may require a license from their regulatory body the form of a Child Development Accreditation (CDA) or formal college education in early childhood or a related subject.

The term "preschool" refers to instruction in non-public arenas such as licensed preschools, childcare centers, family day care centers, home day care centers, center-based programs, federal programs like Head Start, and full or part-day private child centers or day care centers sponsored by religious bodies.
