= Dalem Konferenzen =

Founded in 1974, the mission of the Dahlem Konferenzen was "to promote the interdisciplinary exchange of scientific information and ideas, to stimulate international cooperation in research, and to plan and organize workshops on topics of international interest and suitable for an interdisciplinary approach." Topics were drawn from the natural, physical and social sciences and the humanities. Its name derived from the Berlin suburb of Dahlem, home to the Free University of Berlin, several Max Planck Institutes, scientific federal institutes, and museums.

== Background ==
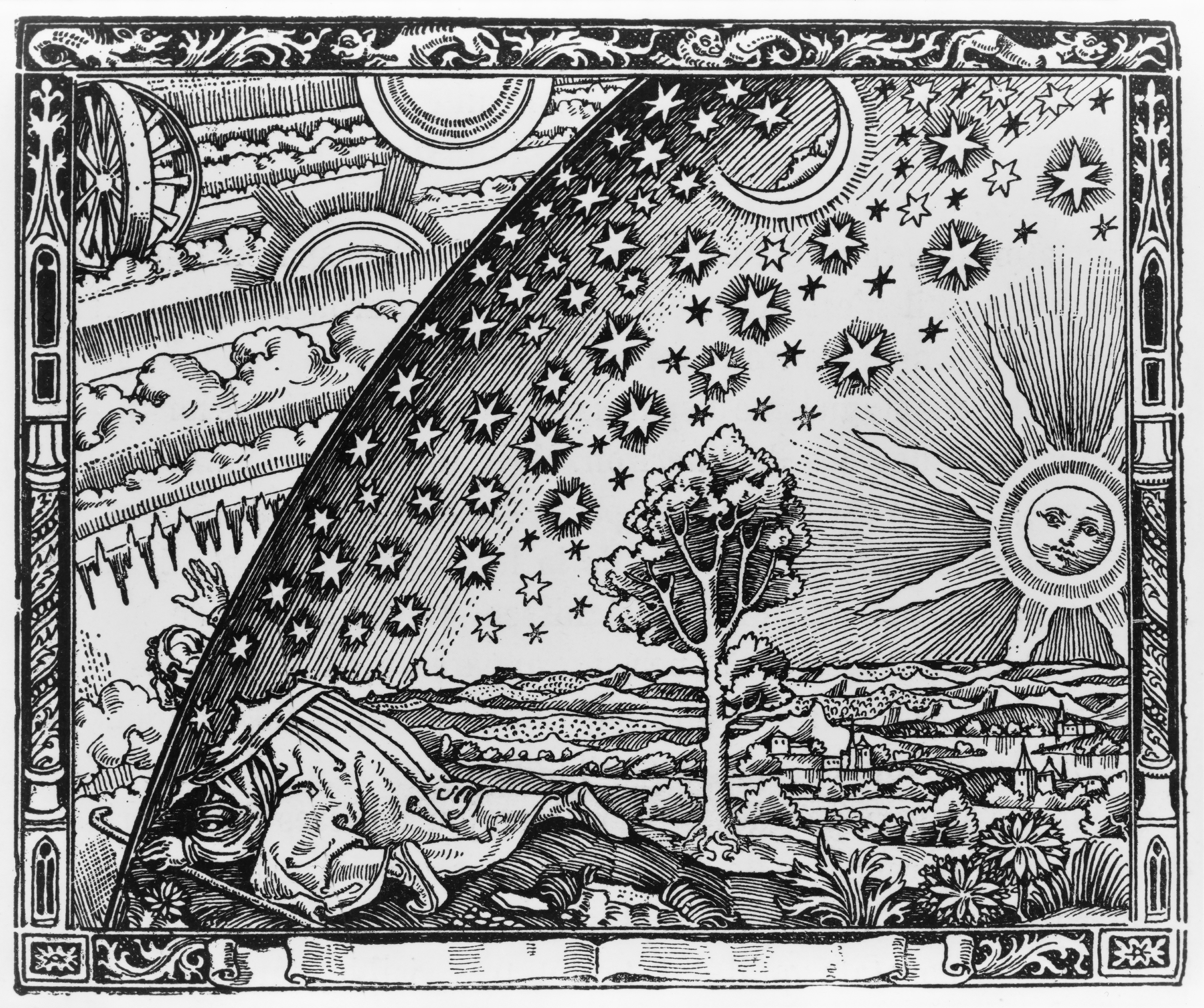
Flammarion engraving, Paris 1888, for Flammarion's 1888 L'atmosphère : météorologie populaire (p. 163). Used as the Dahlem Konferenzen logo.

In the 1970s, when the city of Berlin was still divided, an initiative began within Germany's scientific community to draw scholars back to Berlin. This led to the establishment of the Dahlem Konferenzen in 1974, founded by the Stifterverband für die Deutsche Wissenschaft (the science foundation of German industry, trade, and commerce). Funding was provided by the Stifterverband and the Deutsche Forschungsgemeinschaft (the German research foundation). Initially financed by the Stifterverband as a 5-yr project group, two funding extensions were granted due to its initial success. In 1989, however, the Stifterverband needed to find a permanent home for the Dahlem Konferenzen. Resolving this was complicated by the German Reunification in 1989, with staff facing termination. Ultimately, Dahlem Konferenzen was integrated into the Free University of Berlin in 1990.

Silke Bernhard served as its founding director from 1974 to 1989, followed by Jennifer Altman (interim, 1990–1991), Klaus Roth (1991–2000), and Julia Lupp (2000–2006). In 1987, Dahlem Konferenzen celebrated its 50th workshop and by 2010 it had convened 100 workshops.

After Reunification, the Free University struggled to finance the workshops. In addition, tension developed between the Scientific Advisory Board of the Dahlem Konferenzen and university administrators, when the university made changes to the original mission. The Board felt that these changes would compromise the international reputation of the series. To push forward these changes, university administrators removed Julia Lupp in 2004, and many prominent scientists on the Board resigned in protest. Although Lupp was later reinstated in a modified role, under the supervision of Prof. Dr. Werner Reuter, the changes remained in place and concerned scientists began to search for alternatives.

In 2006, the influential neuroscientist Prof. Dr. Wolf Singer and Lupp established the Ernst Strüngmann Forum within the Frankfurt Institute for Advanced Studies. As Singer stated at the time: "I felt the Dahlem Conference was not what it used to be, so I started looking for financing for a new forum." "The Ernst Strüngmann Forum took off like a phoenix rising from the ashes. Since then, it has embedded itself within the scientific community, earning the reputation as the place where intellectual dead ends are overcome, where new ways of conceptualizing issues are grasped, and where future collaborations are created” (from The History of Neuroscience in Autobiography, vol. 9, p. 476).

The Free University of Berlin discontinued the workshops in 2012. The exact circumstances of this decision are not known.

== Format ==
Originally, each workshop followed the Dahlem Workshop Structure. In her opening statements, Silke Bernhard would encourage participants "to discuss what you don't know." A number of participants were asked to write background papers, which reviewed the field rather than individual work. Lectures were not given. Small group discussions marked the week-long meeting and resulted in group reports that reflected "the current knowledge in the field and suggestions for future research."

Results of each workshop were published in an edited volume by the following publishers: Abakon Verlagsgesellschaft, Verlag-Chemie, Springer, Wiley & Sons, Dahlem University Press, MIT Press and deGruyter.

Originally, the workshops took place in the Europa Center, located downtown in West Berlin next to the Kaiser Wilhelm Memorial Church. Later venues included the Villa Linde, the Japanese Embassy in the Tiergarten, the Harnack House, and various buildings at the Free University of Berlin.

The Dahlem Workshop Structure underwent change over the years, most notably as of 2004.

== Conferences ==
A list of all conferences is available. Some years were missed.

Year	Topic	Organizers
2012 (102)	Opto Genetics: Challenges and Perspectives	Example
2011 (101)	Knowledge Domination and the Public in Africa	Richard Rottenburg, Sandra E. Greene, Vinh-Kim Nguyen, Muna Ndulo
2010 (100)	New Approaches in Economics after The Financial Crisis	C. Jaeger, D. Colander, Th. Lux, D. Mangalagiu
2009 (99)	Infection, Inflammation and Chronic Inflammatory Disorders: Common and Divergent Solutions to Problems at the Host Environment Interface	S. Ehlers, S. Kaufmann
2008 (98)	Is there a Mathematics of Social Entities?	C. Jaeger, R. Klein
2007 (97)	The Globalization of Knowledge	J. Renn
2005 (96)	Integrated History and Future of People on Earth	R. Costanza et al.
2005 (95)	The Dynamic of Fault Zones	Mark Handy et al.
2004 (94)	Heuristics and the Law	C. Engel, G. Gigerenzer
2004 (93)	Microcircuits: The Interface between Neurons and Global Brain Function	S. Grillner
2003 (92)	Attachment and Bonding: A New Synthesis	C.S. Carter, L. Ahnert
2003 (91)	Towards Earth System Analysis	H.J. Schellnhuber, P.J. Crutzen, W.C. Clark
2002 (90)	Genetic and Cultural Evolution of Cooperation	P. Hammerstein
2001 (89)	Energy and Mass Transfer in Marine Hydrothermal Systems	P. Halbach, V. Tunnicliffe
2001 (88)	Global Desertification: Do Humans Cause Deserts?	F Reynolds, M.J. Stafford Smith
2000 (87)	Coping with Challenge: Welfare in Animals Including Humans	DM Broom
2000 (86)	Rational Decision-making in the Preservation of Cultural Property	NS Baer, F. Snickars
1999 (85)	Science and Integrated Coastal Management	B. B. von Bodungen, RK Turner
1998 (84)	Simplicity and Complexity in Proteins and Nucleic Acids	H. Frauenfelder, J. Deisenhofer, PG Wolynes
1998 (83)	Simplicity and Complexity in Proteins and Nucleic Acids	H. Frauenfelder, J. Deisenhofer, PG Wolynes
1998 (82)	Integrating Hydrology, Economic Dynamics, and Biogeochemistry in Complex Landscapes	J. D. Tenhunen, P. Kabat
1997 (81)	The Eradication of Infectious Diseases	W. R. Dowdle, D. R. Hopkins
1997 (80)	Mechanistic Relationships between Development and Learning: Beyond Metaphor	T. J. Carew, R. Menzel, C. J. Shatz
1996 (79)	Saving our Architectural Heritage: The Conservation of Historic Stone Structures	N. S. Baer, R. Snethlage
1995 (78)	The Evolution of the Universe	S. Gottlöber, G. Börner
1995 (77)	Regulation of Body Weight: Biological and Behavioral Mechanisms	C. Bouchard, G. A. Bray
1994 (76)	Upwelling in the Ocean: Modern Processes and Ancient Records	C. P. Summerhayes
1994 (75)	Aerosol Forcing of Climate	R. J. Charlson, J. Heintzenberg
1994 (74)	Molecular Aspects of Aging	K. Esser, G. M. Martin
1993 (73)	The Role of Nonliving Organic Matter in the Earth's Carbon Cycle	R. G. Zepp, G. M. Martin
1993 (72)	Flexibility and Constraint in Behavioral Systems	R. J. Greenspan, C. P. Kyriacou
1993 (71)	Cellular and Molecular Mechanisms Underlying Higher Neural Function	A. I. Selverston, P. Ascher
1992 (70)	Durabiliy and Change: The Science, Responsibility, and Cost of Sustaining Cultural Heritage	W. E. Krumbein
1992 (69)	Acidification of Freshwater Ecosystems: Implications for the future	C. E. W. Steinberg, R. F. Wright
1992 (68)	Twins as a Tool of Behavioural Genetics	T. J. Bouchard Jr., P. Propping
1991 (67)	Fire in the Environment: The Ecological, Atmospheric, and Climatic Importance of Vegetation Fires	P. J. Crutzen, J. G. Goldammer

Source: Free University Berlin
