= Roman Kurtsyn =

Russian actor

- Born: Roman Dmitrievich Kurtsyn; 14 March 1985 (age 40); Kostroma, Russian SFSR, Soviet Union
- Occupation: Actor
- Years active: 2008–present
- Spouse: Anna Nazarova
- Children: 1

Roman Dmitrievich Kurtsyn (Russian: Рома́н Дми́триевич Ку́рцын; born 14 March 1985) is a Russian actor.

== Selected filmography ==
Year	Title	Role	Notes
2017	Have Fun, Vasya!	Maks	
2018	I Am Losing Weight	Zhenya	
2020	Fire	Sergey Zotov	
2022	Eleven Silent Men	Alexei Khomich is a Soviet goalkeeper	
