= The Relatives =

- Theatrical release poster
- Directed by: Ilya Aksyonov
- Written by: Zhora Kryzhovnikov; Aleksey Kazakov
- Produced by: Ilya Stewart; Pavel Burya; Aleksey Kazakov; Zhora Kryzhovnikov; Murad Osmann
- Starring: Sergey Burunov; Irina Pegova; Semyon Treskunov; Elizaveta Gyrdymova; Nikita Pavlenko; Katerina Bekker; Anna Ukolova; Sergey Shakurov
- Cinematography: Anton Zenkovich; Mikhail Solovyov
- Edited by: Yuriy Karikh; Anton Anisimov
- Music by: Igor Matvienko
- Production companies: Columbia Pictures; Hype film; TNT; Ministry of Culture of Russia
- Distributed by: Sony Pictures Releasing CIS
- Release date: February 11, 2021 (Russia)
- Running time: 100 minutes
- Country: Russia
- Language: Russian
- Box office: ₽473 million; $7,708,826

The Relatives (Russian: Родные) is a 2021 Russian tragicomedy road film directed by Ilya Aksyonov. It was released on February 11, 2021, by the Russian division of Sony Pictures Releasing.

== Plot ==
The film tells about a man who gets the opportunity to fulfill his dream and goes with his family to the Grushinsky festival to perform there with his song. Exciting adventures and trials await them along the way.

== Cast ==
- Sergey Burunov as Pavel Kornaukhov, a father
- Irina Pegova as Natalia Kornaukhova, a mother
- Semyon Treskunov as Alexander 'Sanya' Karnaukhov, a son
- Elizaveta Gyrdymova as Anastasia 'Nastya' Kornaukhova, a daughter
- Nikita Pavlenko as Bob Karnaukhov, a son
- Katerina Bekker as Sonya, Sanya's wife
- Anna Ukolova as Olga Savostina, Pavel's school love
- Sergey Shakurov as Mikhail Kornaukhov, a grandfather
- Pavel Vorozhtsov as an invalid
- Dmitriy Rusakov as a salesperson of a music store
- Eleonora Ilchenko as Zoya, aunt
- Larisa Krupina as Masha, aunt

== Production ==
=== Filming ===
In the summer of 2020, they filmed in the Moscow Oblast and Tver Oblast.

== Release ==
On February 8, 2021, the premiere of the film took place at the cinema "Karo 11 October" in Moscow.

The film was released in the Russian Federation on February 11, 2021, by Sony Pictures Productions and Releasing.
