= Irina Gorbacheva =

Russian theater and film actress (born 1988)

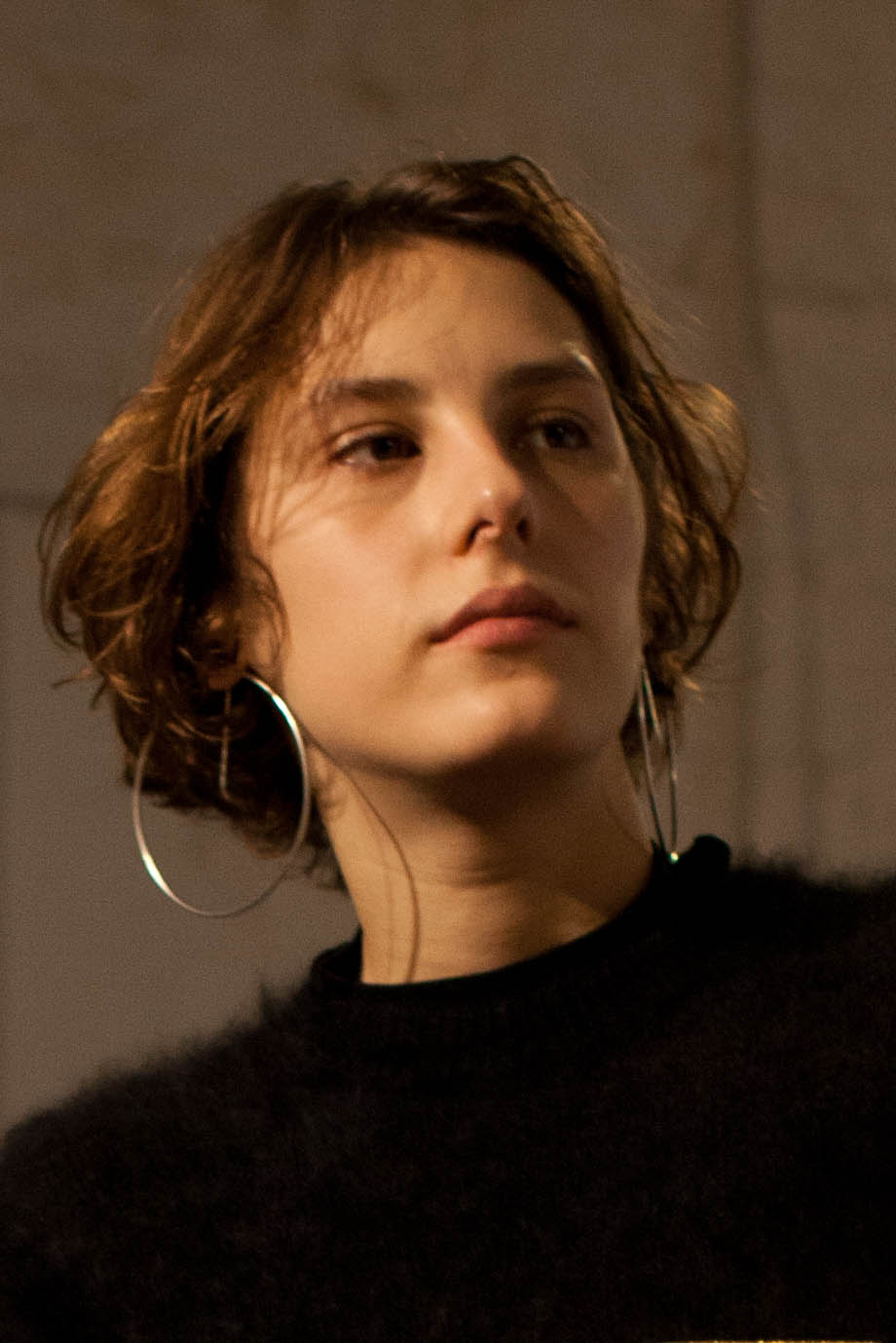
- Gorbacheva in 2017
- Born: Irina Anatolievna Gorbacheva; 10 April 1988 (age 38); Mariupol, Ukrainian SSR, Soviet Union
- Occupation: Actress
- Years active: 2008–present
- Height: 1.84 m (6 ft 0 in)
- Spouse: Grigory Kalinin
- Awards: Golden Eagle Award (2018); Nika Award (2018)

Irina Anatolievna Gorbacheva (Russian: Ирина Анатольевна Горбачёва; born 10 April 1988) is a Russian theater and film actress.

== Biography ==
Gorbacheva was born in Zhdanov, Ukrainian SSR, now Mariupol, Ukraine. In 2006-2010 she studied at the Boris Shchukin Theatre Institute, the course of Rodion Ovchinnikov. During her studies, Irina was involved in the performances of the Vakhtangov Theater. After graduation, she took part in the interns' troupe of Pyotr Fomenko Workshop.

In January 2024, in an interview to the Youtube channel "Madonna Mur" Gorbacheva said that she feels herself Russian and not Ukrainian, supported the Russian invasion of Ukraine and said that she helps to the refugees from the Donetsk and Luhansk People's Republics to Russia.

== Personal life ==
In March 2015, she married Russian actor dubbing Grigory Kalinin. They divorced in 2018.

== Filmography ==
=== Films ===
List of film credits
Year	Title	Role	Notes
2010	Compensation	Lena	
2015	A Midsummer Night's Dream	Helena	
2016	I Know How to Knit	Vasya	
2016	Ballerina	Madame Regina Le O	Dubbing
2017	Arrhythmia	Katya	
2017	Icaria	Head Performer	
2017	Loving Vincent	Louise Chevalier	Dubbing
2018	A Rough Draft		
2018	I Am Losing Weight	Natasha	
2018	Coach	Lara	
2018	Story of One Appointment	Sophia Tolstaya	
2018	Ralph Breaks the Internet	Yesss	Dubbing
2018	Kilimanjaro		
2019	The Angry Birds Movie 2	Zeta	Dubbing
2019	Loud Connection	Alina	
2020	Obratnaya svyaz	Alina	
2020	Fire	Zoya	
2021	Couple from the Future	IRI	
2023	Breath	Elena Kolesnikova	
2024	The Bremen Town Musicians	Cat	
2024	The Tinderbox	Alkonost \ Gamayun	
2025	Alice in Wonderland	Alice's mother \ the Queen of Hearts	

=== TV series ===
List of television credits
Year	Title	Role	Notes
2013	Shores of My Dreams	Vika	
2013	Two Winters and Three Summers	Nastya Gavrilina	
2015	The Young Guard	Juliana Gromova	
2019	Chicks	Zhanna	
