= Federal Agency for Forestry =

- Федеральное агентство лесного хозяйства России (Рослесхоз)
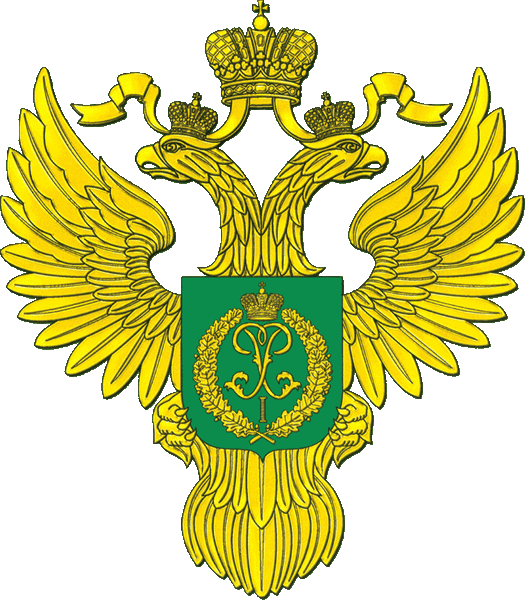
- Emblem

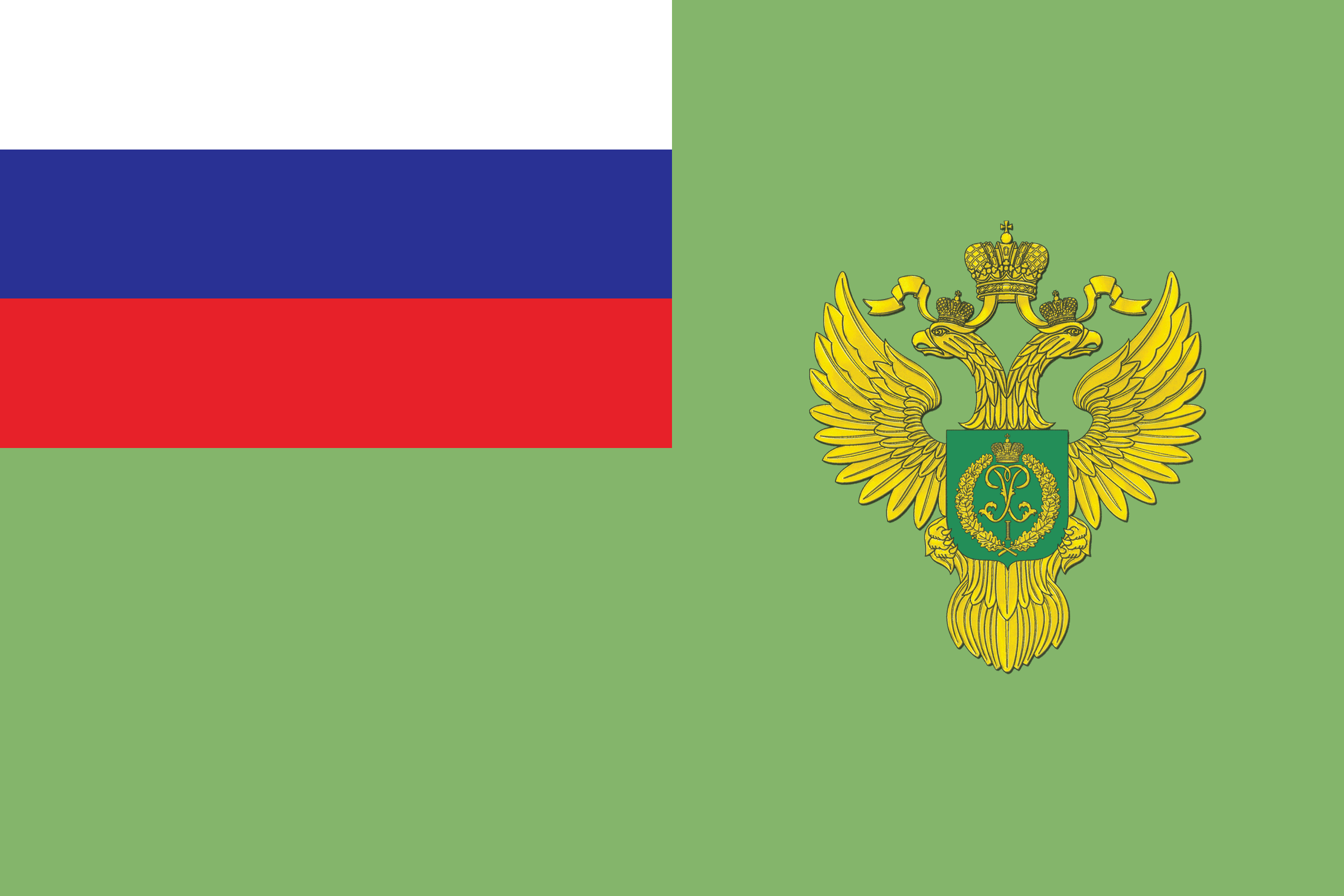
- Flag

Agency overview
- Formed: 27 March 2004; 22 years ago
- Headquarters: Pyatnitskaya ulitsa, 59/19, Moscow, Russia
- Agency executive: Ivan Sovestnikov
- Parent agency: Ministry of Natural Resources and Environment
- Website: Rosleshoz.gov.ru

The Federal Agency for Forestry (Rosleskhoz; Russian: Федеральное агентство лесного хозяйства России (Рослесхоз), romanized: Federal'naya agentstvo po nedropol'zovaniyu) is a federal body that exercises oversight over forestry in the Russian Federation. It was formed on 2004 as part of Russia's Ministry of Natural Resources and Environment.
