= Asymmetry (Karnivool album) =

Studio album by Karnivool
- Released: 19 July 2013
- Genre: Progressive rock; alternative metal
- Length: 67:01
- Label: Density; Cymatic
- Producer: Nick DiDia

Karnivool chronology
Sound Awake (2009)	Asymmetry (2013)	In Verses (2026)

Deluxe edition
- Deluxe edition (Australia)

Singles from Asymmetry
- 1. "We Are" Released: 14 June 2013; 2. "Eidolon" Released: 1 November 2013

Asymmetry is the third studio album by the Australian rock band Karnivool. It is their first release in over four years, since Sound Awake (2009). It was released on 19 July 2013. The album's first single, "We Are", was released, along with an accompanying music video, released on 14 June 2013.

At the J Awards of 2013, the album was nominated for Australian Album of the Year.

== Production ==
After extensive worldwide touring in support of their second album, Sound Awake, Karnivool took a break in 2010 so that vocalist Ian Kenny could work with his other band, Birds of Tokyo. The band would reconvene in 2011, when they would alternate between working on writing new music and performing on their "Melodias Frescas" tour through Australia. The band wrote the album over a two-year span, and then recorded it over a three-month span. The band worked with American music producer Nick DiDia. Drew Goddard said about the album title: "Asymmetry to me is about two sides of the coin and the beauty in imperfection. Also about seeing beyond duality".

== Promotion and release ==
On 14 June 2013, the band announced that the album would release on 19 July 2013, and would be followed by a national tour to support the release. The first studio track from the album to be heard was "The Refusal", which was first played on radio station Triple J on 19 May 2013. The band revealed their first single on 2 June 2013 at Perth's State of the Art festival. On 14 June 2013, the band released the music video for "We Are", which was directed by Chris Frey.

== Reception ==
Professional ratings
Aggregate scores
Source	Rating
Metacritic	82/100
Review scores
Source	Rating
Sputnikmusic	3.2/5
VH1	8/10

The album received generally positive reviews, with review aggregator Metacritic, assigning an average score of 82 out of 100, based on five reviews. New Noise Magazine gave Asymmetry a positive review, saying "Asymmetry literally takes what we know from Karnivool – the Tool influenced soundscape, throbbing metal riffs and fantastic structural passages – and kicks them up a notch. Way up a notch. I can honestly say that this is one of the best Karnivool releases that I’ve ever heard and that’s saying a great deal." The AU Review gave the album 8.9 out of 10, stating that "the fantastic metal riffs and punishing drumbeats that are scattered in amongst the quieter, almost contemplative moments on the record really make it shine and stand out amongst the other Karnivool records..." The Music gave the album a positive review, saying that "Asymmetry is challenging and complex yet intricate and delicate at times. It is not an easy listen but that is not what you would expect from a band of this depth. This album demands contemplation and deserves it." LifeMusicMedia also praised the album, arguing that "Asymmetry is likely to be the most rewarding, innovative release of the year." VH1 has rated the album 8/10, stating that "Asymmetry is exactly the album Karnivool needed to put out, and more so, an album that will cement them as pioneers of the ‘progressive’ faction."

== Track listing ==
All tracks are written by Karnivool.

Asymmetry
No.	Title	Length
1.	"Aum"	2:22
2.	"Nachash"	4:50
3.	"A.M.War"	5:18
4.	"We Are"	5:55
5.	"The Refusal"	4:54
6.	"Aeons"	7:18
7.	"Asymmetry"	2:36
8.	"Eidolon"	3:45
9.	"Sky Machine"	7:49
10.	"Amusia"	0:54
11.	"The Last Few"	5:15
12.	"Float"	4:17
13.	"Alpha Omega"	7:57
14.	"Om"	3:51

=== Deluxe edition DVD track listing ===
1. "Simple Boy"
2. "Goliath"
3. "Shutterspeed"
4. "C.O.T.E."
5. "New Day"
6. "Fear of the Sky"
7. "Deadman"
8. "All I Know"
9. "Umbra"
10. "Themata"
11. "Set Fire to the Hive"
12. "Roquefort"
13. "Change"

Note

- The DVD was released with the deluxe version of the album and was recorded at The Forum Theatre in Melbourne, Australia on 26 June 2009.

== Personnel ==
- Ian Kenny – lead vocals
- Drew Goddard – guitar, backing vocals
- Mark Hosking – guitar, backing vocals
- Jon Stockman – bass guitar, vocals on The Refusal
- Steve Judd – drums, percussion

== Charts ==
=== Weekly charts ===
Chart (2013)	Peak position
Australian Albums (ARIA)	1
Finnish Albums (Suomen virallinen lista)	37
German Albums (Offizielle Top 100)	44
New Zealand Albums (RMNZ)	31
Swiss Albums (Schweizer Hitparade)	45
US Independent Albums (Billboard)	50
US Heatseekers Albums (Billboard)	8

=== Year-end charts ===
Chart (2013)	Position
Australian Albums (ARIA)	91

== Certifications ==
Region	Certification	Certified units/sales
Australia (ARIA)	Gold	35,000^{^}
^{^} Shipments figures based on certification alone.
