= List of Russian films of 2013 =

A list of films produced in Russia in 2013 (see 2013 in film).

== 2013 ==
	Title	Russian title	Cast and Crew	Genre(s)	Notes
January 24	Ticket to Vegas	Билет на Vegas	Director: Gor Kirakosian; Ivan Stebunov, Ingrid Olerinskaya, Vladimir Yaglych, Nataliya Nozdrina, Mikhail Galustyan	Comedy	
February 20	Winter Journey	Зимний путь	Director: Lubov Lvova, Sergey Taramaev; Cast: Aleksey Frandetti, Evgeniy Tkachuk	Drama	
February 21	Metro	Метро	Director: Anton Megerdichev; Cast: Sergei Puskepalis, Anatoly Bely, Svetlana Khodchenkova	Disaster	
February 28	Sex Competition	Что творят мужчины!	Director: Sarik Andreasyan; Cast: Tair Mamedov, Roman Yunusov, Konstantin Kryukov	Comedy	
February	Hard to be a God	История арканарской резни / Трудно быть богом	Director: Alexey German Sr. Cast: Leonid Yarmolnik	Art house drama	Based on the book of the same name by Strugatskies
March 18	Enough	Хватит - новый русский фильм	Director: Ockert Potgieter		
April 11	Ku! Kin-dza-dza	Ку! Кин-дза-дза	Director: Tatyana Ilina; Cast: Nikolai Gubenko, Andrei Leonov	Science fiction, animation	animated version of Kin-dza-dza! (1986)
April 18	Legend № 17	Легенда №17	Director: Nikolai Lebedev; Cast: Danila Kozlovsky, Vladimir Menshov, Svetlana Ivanova	Biography, Drama, Sport	Official website
May 1	The Treasure of Lake Kaban	Сокровища О. К.	Director: Dmitriy Korobkin; Cast: Alexey Vorobyov, Maria Kozhevnikova, Elvira Ibragimova, Anora Khalmatova	Adventure, Comedy	
June 2	Weekend	Weekend	Director: Stanislav Govorukhin; Cast: Maksim Matveyev, Viktor Sukhorukov, Yulia Peresild, Yekaterina Guseva	Crime, Drama, Mystery	
June 6	Gagarin: First in Space	Гагарин. Первый в космосе	Director: Pavel Parkhomenko; Cast: Yaroslav Zhalnin, Mikhail Filippov, Olga Ivanova, Vadim Michman, Vladimir Steklov	Biography, Drama	
June 22	The Rehearsals	Репетиции	Director: Oksana Karas; Cast: Nikita Efremov	Drama	
August 8	The Major	Майор	Director: Yuri Bykov; Cast: Denis Shvedov, Yuri Bykov, Irina Nizina, Ilya Isaev	Action, Crime, Drama	
September 19	One Particular Pioneer	Частное пионерское	Director: Aleksandr Karpilovskiy; Cast: Semyon Treskunov, Egor Klinaev, Anfisa Vistingauzen, Svetlana Ivanova	Comedy, Family	
September 30	The Role	Роль	Director: Konstantin Lopushansky; Cast: Maksim Sukhanov, Aleksandr Efremov, Maria Järvenhelmi	Drama	
October 10	Stalingrad	Сталинград	Director: Fyodor Bondarchuk; Cast: Pyotr Fyodorov, Dmitriy Lysenkov, Alexey Barabash, Andrey Smolyakov Yanina Studilina Maria Smolnikova	Action, Drama, War	considered as Russia’s first big-budget IMAX and 3D movie.
October 16	About a wife, a dream and another...	Про жену, мечту и еще одну...	Director: Alexander Pozhenskiy; Cast: Alexandra Kulikova, Konstantin Yushkevich	Dramedy	A date. Maria and Vasin do not realize that in a parallel world they have a different life. Wonderful life, where well formed what they seem to be lacking today...
October 24	Gorko!	Горько!	Director: Zhora Kryzhovnikov; Cast: Yuliya Aleksandrova, Anastasiya Dobakhova, Sergei Svetlakov	Comedy	
November 7	The Geographer Drank His Globe Away	Географ глобус пропил	Director: Alexander Veledinsky Cast: Konstantin Khabensky, Elena Lyadova, Anna Ukolova, Evgeniya Khirivskaya	Adventure, Drama	
November 14	The Three Musketeers	Три мушкетёра	Director: Sergei Zhigunov; Cast: Yuri Chursin, Alexei Makarov, Pavel Barshak, Rinal Mukhametov	History, adventure	will be released in both versions: Film and TV Miniseries
December 5	Dark World: Balance	Тёмный мир: Равновесие	Director: Oleg Asadulin; Cast: Mariya Pirogova, Pavel Priluchniy, Aleksandr Ratnikov	Twelve-series television	sequel for Dark World
December 26	Ivan Tsarevich and the Gray Wolf 2	Иван Царевич и Серый волк 2	Director: Vladimir Toropchin; Cast: Nikita Yefremov, Aleksandr Boyarskiy, Tatyana Bunina, Mikhail Boyarsky	Animation, Family	Melnitsa Animation Studio
December 26	Yolki 3	Ёлки 3	Directors: Olga Kharina, Dmitry Kiselyov, Levan Gabriadze among others. Cast: Ivan Urgant, Sergey Svetlakov, Pyotr Fyodorov	Comedy	
February 5, 2015	The Invisibles	Невидимки	Director: Sergey Komarov; Cast: Ilya Lyubimov, Yekaterina Guseva, Andrei Merzlikin	Comedy, fantasy	
2015	Arventour	Арвентур	Director: Irina Evteeva; Cast: Sergey Dreyden, Vladimir Koshevoy, Valentin Tszin, Yan Nam	Animation, Fantasy, Mystery	(2015)

== See also ==
- 2013 in film
- 2013 in Russia
