= The Siren Tower =

Australian musical group

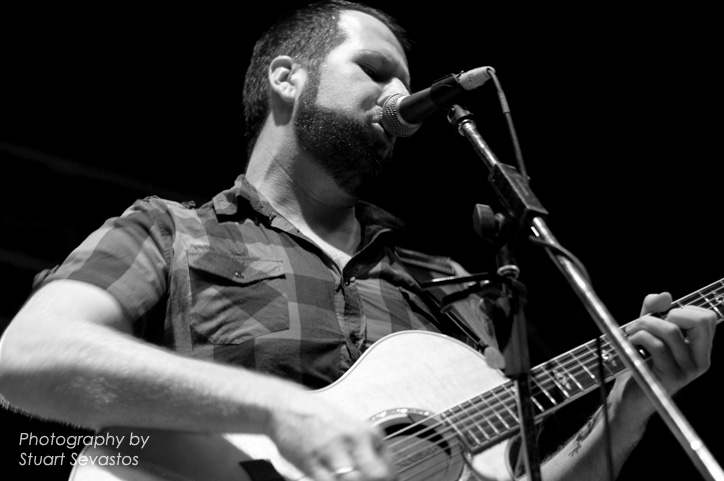

Background information
- Origin: Perth, Australia
- Genres: rock, folk, country
- Years active: 2008–present
- Label: Independent
- Members: Grant McCulloch; Brody Simpson; Mark McEwen
- Past members: Gareth Hughes; Clay Smith
- Website: thesirentower.com

The Siren Tower are a rock, folk and country band from Perth, Australia, formed in 2008 by former Heavy Weight Champ singer-guitarist Grant McCulloch and former Antistatic drummer Brody Simpson. After establishing a sound and direction, the pair recruited Clay Smith on guitar and Gareth Hughes on bass; shortly after, Mark McEwen took over guitar duties, seeing Smith move to guitar and keyboard.

In mid-2009, the band released its debut, a double A-side consisting of the tracks "Letter From The Edge of the Earth" and "The Bridgehouse". They then began work on their debut album, A History of Houses. In March 2011, "Floods", the first single from A History of Houses, was released and was later nominated for WAM Song of the Year. In November 2011, The Banishing of William McGuiness, the second single from A History of Houses, was released and was later short-listed in its category in the Australian Songwriters Association's Songwriting Contest; also the video for the song was selected for inclusion on the 2012 WAMi Festival DVD. In December 2011, both Smith and Hughes left the band to pursue other musical projects. In March 2012, the third single from A History of Houses, All Things Will Change, was released. The album A History of Houses was released on 29 June 2012 through Firestarter Distribution to positive reviews in the Australian press.

== History ==
After retiring his former Perth-based group Heavy Weight Champ in 2007, singer-guitarist Grant McCulloch was on musical hiatus; this changed at the beginning of 2008 when Antistatic drummer Brody Simpson became a free agent. The pair had designs on creating something removed from the heavy rock sound of their previous acts. After lengthy discussions, it was decided the new project would explore the acoustic material McCulloch had been writing and pursue sounds borrowing from the folk, country and roots genres to complement their rock leanings.

McCulloch and Simpson spent six months working on new material. In mid-2008 Clay Smith joined the band on guitars and Gareth Hughes on bass. The band moved into a room at R+R Studios in Perth, recently vacated by Karnivool, and began fleshing out their first songs; it was during this period that the band would settle on The Siren Tower as their moniker.

In November 2008, the band played their debut show at Perth's Rosemount Hotel, supporting Will Stoker and the Embers. A few months later, in only their third performance, The Siren Tower played main support to Birds of Tokyo in front of a sold out Metro City crowd on the Wild Eyed Boy Tour.

The band entered Underground Studios in Perth in June, 2009 to record two tracks for a double A-side release, Letter From The Edge of The Earth and The Bridgehouse. The sessions were engineered by Voltaire Twin's drummer Matt Giovannangelo. In August 2009 the band launched the double A-side to a sold out Amplifier Bar in Perth. Drum Media had this to say of the release..."This band was always going to be good, it was only ever a question of how good they were going to be, and if their double a-side single is anything to go by – the answer is bloody good."

In mid-2009, Mark McEwen of the Perth band, Nix, was added on guitar, while Smith moved to keyboard/guitar.

In November 2009 The Siren Tower won Stagebound, a competition to award a West Australian act a slot on the 2010 Southbound Festival. The band joined the bill which included headliners such as Yeah Yeah Yeahs, Grizzly Bear, Major Lazer and other national and international acts.

Throughout 2009-2010 the band continued working in their permanent room at what was now The Henhouse Rehearsal Studios in Perth, building their debut album, A History of Houses. In October 2010 the band entered Underground Studios again, this time with co-producer, Forrester Savell (Karnivool, Dallas Frasca, Birds of Tokyo, The Butterfly Effect) to begin recording the album. After a month of tracking, Savell returned to his native Melbourne to start work, mixing the first tracking sessions, while the band continued to record in Perth. McCulloch, Simpson and McEwen joined Savell at Sing Sing studios in Melbourne in early 2011 for additional tracking sessions, before McCulloch and McEwen joined Savell again for the final sessions a month later. The album was mastered by Tom Coyne (Adele, Joss Stone) at Sterling Studios in New York in March 2011.

In February 2011, the band entered Perth's Kingdom Studios to film and music video for "Floods", the first single taken from A History of Houses. Award-winning cinematographer Jim Frater produced the video along with Grant McCulloch and The Siren Tower. "Floods" was released in March 2011. The band played its first shows on the Australian East coast in August 2011 launching the single before returning home to launch in Western Australia. In September 2011, "Floods" was nominated for WAMi Song of the Year.

In August 2011 the band shot a music video for "The Banishing of William McGuiness", the second single from A History of Houses, in and around the old period homes found in the Fairbridge Village in Pinjarra, Western Australia. The video was directed by Tim Brade and produced by The Siren Tower. The video would later be selected for inclusion on the 2012 WAMi Festival DVD. The Siren Tower released "The Banishing of William McGuiness" in November 2011 and held launches throughout November and December in Perth, Melbourne and Sydney. In December "The Banishing of William McGuiness" was short-listed in its category in the Australian Songwriters Association's Songwriting Contest.

In September 2011, both Smith and Hughes left the band to pursue other musical projects, leaving McCulloch, Simpson and McEwen. It was agreed for the immediate future, session musicians would be brought in for live purposes.

The band entered the old Chidlow Town Hall outside of Perth in early February 2012 to film a live version of All Things Will Change, the third single taken from A History of Houses. The video was created by McCulloch, Simpson and McEwen, who took turns operating the camera and playing. The single was launched at Rosemount Hotel in March 2012.

In April 2012, The Siren Tower began releasing weekly videos entitled A History Of..., a 12-part series looking at the conception and production of their debut album A History of Houses. Each episode looked at the story of a particular song on the album. The series was recorded and edited by McCulloch, McEwen and Simpson.

Ahead of 29 June release date of A History of Houses, The Siren Tower played album launches in Melbourne, St Kilda, Bunbury and Perth in June 2012.

A History of Houses was released on 29 June 2012. Zoo magazine had this to say of the release: "With grunt, guts and gravitas, and driven by a heavy acoustic feel, it's hands down the most quintessential Aussie record we've heard since the golden eras of Cold Chisel or Paul Kelly. We shit you not – musically, it stands toe-to-toe Oz rock's greats... Best new band? No f**kin question. We need more stars, this is a straight up classic – *****"

== Discography ==
=== Studio albums ===
- A History of Houses (June 2012, independent)

=== Extended plays ===
- "Double A-side – Letter From The Edge of the Earth, The Bridgehouse" (August 2009, independent)

=== Singles ===
- "Floods" (March 2011)
- "The Banishing of William McGuiness" (November 2011)
- "All Things Will Change" (March 2012)
