= Persona (Karnivool EP) =

EP by Karnivool
- Released: 1 March 2001; 15 December 2005
- Recorded: August, September, December 2000
- Length: 33:49
- Label: Sic Squared
- Producer: Forrester Savell; Karnivool

Karnivool chronology
Karnivool (1999)	Persona (2001)	Themata (2005)

Alternative Cover
- 2005 reissue

Persona is the second EP by the Australian rock band Karnivool. The disc was originally released on 1 March 2001 via Sic Squared Records, selling 2,000 copies. It was re-released on the band's own label on 12 December 2005 via MGM Distribution, whilst the band were touring for their album Themata. The re-release reaching #1 on the AIR Charts Top 20 Singles (Independent Distribution) chart. The re-release featured a different inkblot cover. In 2006, the EP was nominated for 'Best Performing Single/EP' at the inaugural Australian Independent Record Labels Association (AIR) Awards. The EP was subsequently released in the United States on 24 April 2007.

== Track listing ==
No.	Title	Writer(s)	Length
1.	"Fade"	Ian Kenny, Drew Goddard, Jonathon Stockman, Raymond Hawking	4:51
2.	"Da-Reka" (featuring Grant McCulloch)	Kenny, Goddard	6:18
3.	"Headcase"	Kenny, Goddard, Stockman, Hawking	5:13
4.	"Featherweight"	Kenny, Goddard	8:20
5.	"Some More of the Same"	Kenny, Goddard	9:06
Total length:			33:49

== Personnel ==
Karnivool

- Ian Kenny – lead vocals
- Drew Goddard – guitar, backing vocals
- Jonathon Stockman – bass
- Raymond Hawking – drums

Additional

- Grant McCulloch – vocals (track 2), graphic design, layout
- Forrester Savell – producer, engineer, mastering
- Aidan Barton – mastering
- Lukas Best – artwork (2001 release), graphic design, layout
- Joey Kapiteyn – artwork (2005 release)
- Cassie Alp – photography
- Dennis Radacic – photography
