= Dykhaniye =

Breath
- Directed by: Roman Karimov
- Written by: Andrey Goncharov; Roman Karimov; Sergey Torchilin
- Produced by: Nadezhda Guselnikova; Eduard Iloyan; Sergei Mayevsky
- Starring: Irina Gorbacheva; Anton Batyrev; Daniil Vorobyov; Andrey Karako; Vera Shpak; Yevgeniya Khrapovitskaya; Dmitry Pavlenko
- Cinematography: Vladimir Bashta
- Release date: June 22, 2023 (Russia)
- Country: Russia
- Language: Russian

Breath (Russian: Дыхание, romanized: Dykhaniye) is a Russian drama film directed by Roman Karimov. This film was theatrically released on June 22, 2023.

== Plot ==
The film is about a talented businessman who goes to the hospital to help his mother cope with the coronavirus and prepare for the impact of the pandemic.

== Cast ==
- Irina Gorbacheva as Kolesnikova
- Anton Batyrev as Viktor Likhachyov
- Daniil Vorobyov as Shutov
- Andrey Karako
- Vera Shpak as Marina
- Yevgeniya Khrapovitskaya as Katya Shutova
- Dmitry Pavlenko as Osipenko
