= All at Once =

All at Once may refer to:

- All at Once, a Japanese pop duo
- All at Once (The Airborne Toxic Event album), 2011
- All at Once (Screaming Females album), 2018
- "All at Once" (The Fray song), 2007
- "All at Once" (Whitney Houston song), 1985
- "All At Once", a song by Madison Beer from F1 the Album, 2025
- All at Once (2014 film), a Russian comedy film
- All at Once (2016 film), an American drama film
