= Ilya Naishuller =

Russian musician and filmmaker (born 1983)

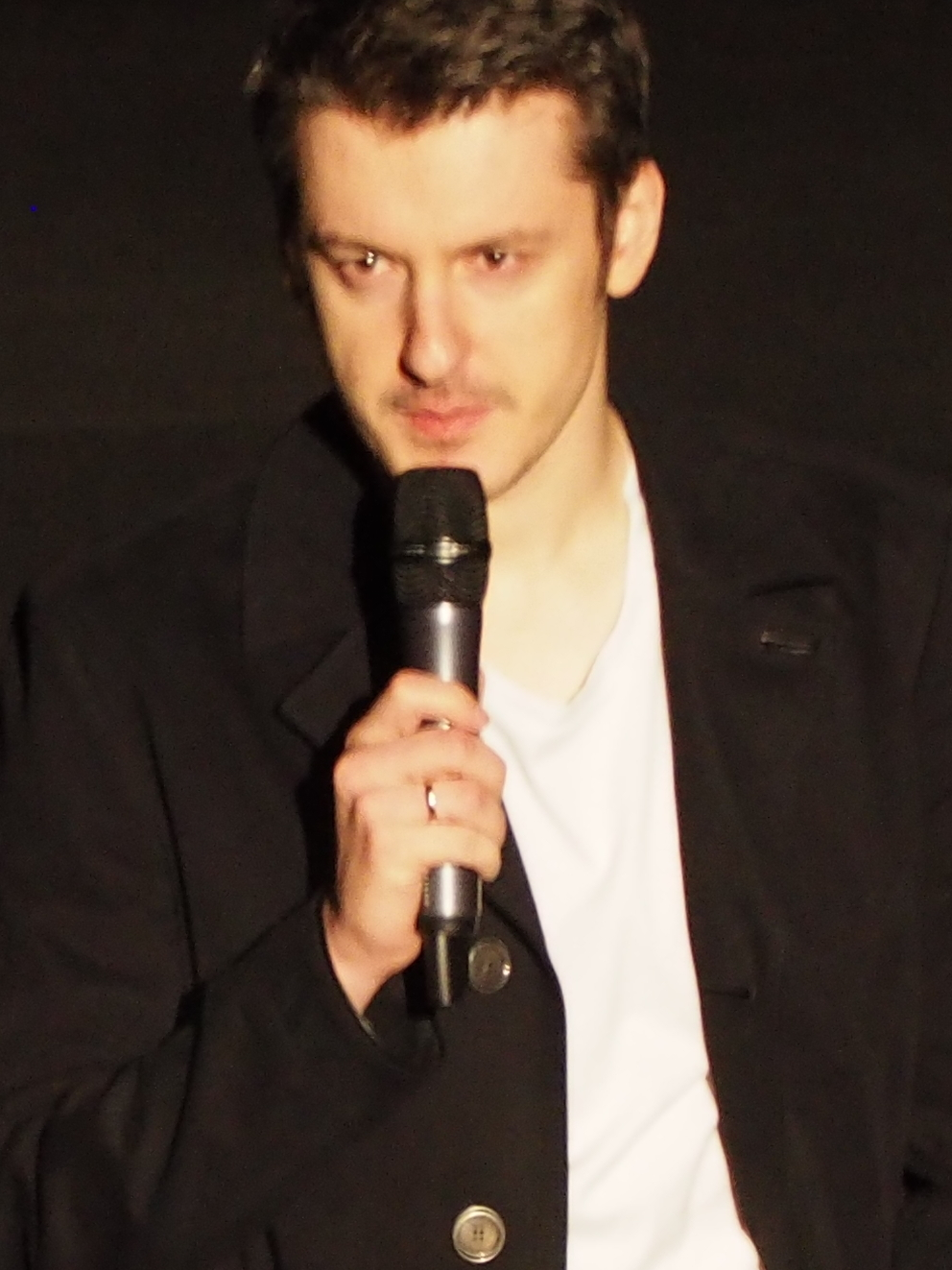
- Naishuller at the Toronto International Film Festival in 2015
- Born: November 19, 1983 (age 42); Moscow, Russian SFSR, Soviet Union (now Russia)
- Occupations: Filmmaker; Musician
- Years active: 2008–present
- Notable work: Nobody; Hardcore Henry; Co-founder of Biting Elbows
- Spouse: Darya Charusha (m. 2010)
- Musical career
- Genre: Rock
- Instruments: Vocals; Guitar

Ilya Viktorovich Naishuller (Russian: Илья Викторович Найшуллер; born November 19, 1983) is a Russian film director and musician. He is known for directing the action films Hardcore Henry (2015) and Nobody (2021). He is also the founder of the film production company Versus Pictures and the indie rock band Biting Elbows.

== Early life ==
Naishuller was born in Moscow, the son of a surgeon mother, Tatyana Rusakova, and an "oligarch" businessman father, "one of the richest people in Russia in the early 1990s", Viktor Naishuller, of Jewish background. From the ages of seven to fourteen he lived in London and attended a private school.

After returning to Russia, he graduated from the British International School (Moscow) in Yasenevo District, Moscow. He dropped out of the All-Russian Research Institute of Television and Radio Broadcasting. He studied at the New York University Tisch School of the Arts and met several filmmakers that he would collaborate with later. Naishuller left school to pursue music. He did not complete his higher education.

== Career ==
In 2008, he founded the rock band Biting Elbows as lead singer and guitarist. In 2011, they released the EP Dope Fiend Massacre and their debut album Biting Elbows.

In 2011, he directed and edited the music video for The Stampede, a song featured in Dope Fiend Massacre EP. The music video was shot entirely in POV, it also serves as inspiration and build-up for Bad Motherfucker, another music video for the hit single. It was released in 2013, quickly becoming a viral online hit, accumulating over 150 million views. The video caught the attention of Hollywood agents and talents, notably by filmmaker Darren Aronofsky.

In 2015, Naishuller directed the independent feature film Hardcore, later renamed Hardcore Henry. It stars Sharlto Copley, Danila Kozlovsky, Haley Bennett, and Tim Roth. It was produced by Timur Bekmambetov, Inga Vainshtein Smith, and Ekaterina Kononenko. It was filmed entirely in POV as well. Naishuller is credited as screenwriter, director, producer and acted as one of the people playing the titular character. The film premiered at the Toronto International Film Festival in 2015 and won the festival's People's Choice Award. It was released theatrically by STXfilms on April 8, 2016. It went on to gross $14.3 million USD, in the US. Simultaneously, a comic book was released titled "Hardcore Akan #1", written by Naishuller, Brian Phillipson, and Will Stewart. It is a prequel to the film and provides the backstory for Akan, a villain in the film.

In 2016, he directed the music video for "False Alarm" by The Weeknd; it stars Kristine Froseth and Damion Poitier. In 2017, he directed the music video for Kolshchik by Russian rock band Leningrad, it won the Berlin Music Video Awards in 2017, while taking the first place for the "Best Concept" category. He has also directed 3 other music videos for the band, that being Voyage, Ju-Ju, and Tsoi.

In 2021, Naishuller directed Nobody, an American action film written by Derek Kolstad. It stars Bob Odenkirk, Connie Nielsen, Aleksei Serebryakov, RZA and Christopher Lloyd. It premiered as theaters in the United States were starting to reopen, following the initial COVID-19 outbreak. Nobody debuted at #1 at the US Box Office in its opening weekend.

Naishuller worked as the motion capture director for the 2024 video game S.T.A.L.K.E.R. 2: Heart of Chornobyl. He also provided his voice and likeness for the character of Nimble.

He directed Heads of State, written by Josh Appelbaum, André Nemec, and Harrison Query. It stars Idris Elba, John Cena, and Priyanka Chopra. Heads of State was released on July 2nd, 2025 on Prime Video.

== Personal life ==
In summer 2010, he married actress Daria (Darya) Charusha.

== Filmography ==
=== Film ===
Director

| Year | Title | Notes |
|---|---|---|
| 2015 | Hardcore Henry | Also writer, producer and cinematographer |
| 2021 | Nobody | |
| 2025 | Heads of State | |
| TBA | Road House 2 | Post-production |

Actor

| Year | Title | Role |
|---|---|---|
| 2014 | All at Once | Armourer |
| 2015 | Hardcore Henry | Timothy / Higher-Self Merc / Henry |
| 2021 | Nobody | Hitman Anatoly |
| 2021 | The Execution | Suspect |
| 2022 | Young Man | Bank manager |
| 2025 | Heads of State | Polish cop |

Other credits

| Year | Title | Notes |
|---|---|---|
| 2016 | The Medic | A piece from Saatchi & Saatchi's 25x25 - a collection of 1 minute shorts directed by the participants of the last 25 years of the New Director's Showcase |
| 2018 | I Am Losing Weight | Producer |
| 2020 | The Marathon of Desires | Producer and co-writer |
| 2022 | Young Man | Producer |
| 2023 | Centaur | Producer |

=== Music video ===
| Year | Artist | Title | Director | Producer | Ref. |
|---|---|---|---|---|---|
| 2010 | Biting Elbows | Dope Fiend Massacre | Yes | No | |
| 2011 | Biting Elbows | The Stampede | Yes | No | |
| 2012 | Biting Elbows | Toothpick | Yes | No | |
| 2013 | Biting Elbows | Bad Motherfucker | Yes | No | |
| 2016 | The Weeknd | False Alarm | Yes | No | |
| 2017 | Leningrad | "Кольщик" (Kolshchik) | Yes | No | |
| 2017 | Leningrad | "Вояж" (Voyage) | Yes | No | |
| 2018 | Leningrad | "Жу-Жу" (Ju-Ju) | Yes | No | |
| 2018 | Leningrad | "Цой" (Tsoi) | Yes | No | |
| 2018 | Leningrad | "Золото" (Gold) | No | Yes | |
| 2019 | Biting Elbows | Heartache | Yes | Yes | |
| 2019 | Biting Elbows | Control | Yes | Yes | |
| 2021 | Serj Tankian | Elasticity | No | Yes | |
| 2021 | Biting Elbows | Boy is Dead | Yes | Yes | |

=== Video games ===
| Year | Title | Voice role | Notes |
|---|---|---|---|
| 2024 | S.T.A.L.K.E.R. 2: Heart of Chornobyl | Nimble | Also likeness |
