= Petrunin =

Petrunin (Russian: Петру́нин; masculine) or Petrunina (Russian: Петру́нина; feminine) is a Russian last name shared by the following people:

- Daniil Petrunin (born 1999), Russian association football player
- Nikolay Petrunin (1976–2022), Russian politician
- Yefim Petrunin, actor who played Mitya in Have Fun, Vasya!, a 2017 Russian comedy movie
