= Park Live Festival =

Annual international music festival

Park Live
- Genre: Rock · Alternative rock · Pop · Indie · Electronic · Synth-pop · Heavy metal · Psychedelic rock · Punk rock
- Dates: The last weekend in June (2013–2015); July 9, July 10, 2016 (2016); July 5, 2017 (2017); July 27, July 28, July 29, 2018 (2018); July 12, July 13, July 14, 2019 (2019); July 17, July 18, July 19, 2020 (2020)
- Locations: Russia, Moscow, Luzhniki Olympic Complex (2022— ) Russia, Moscow, Gorky Park (2018 — 2019); Russia, Moscow, Arena CSKA (2017); Russia, Moscow, Otkrytie Arena (2015–2016); Russia, Moscow, All-Russia Exhibition Centre (2013–2014) Ukraine, Kyiv, concert clubs "Stereo plaza", "SENTRUM" (2014)
- Years active: 2013–present
- Founders: CA "Melnitsa"
- Website: park.live

Park Live (Russian: Парк Лайв) is an annual international music festival, which takes place in Moscow, Russia. The main point of festival is to bring "pop-culture heroes of our time" to Russia.

== 2013 ==
The first festival was held at the All-Russia Exhibition Centre for three days from June 28 to 30. The event was headlined by Limp Bizkit, The Killers, and Zemfira. In addition, on the night of June 29–30, Park Live Night was held at the Chemical Stage, located in the pavilion of VDNKh No. 20 "Chemical Industry" from 23 p.m. to 6 a.m. the next day.

The festival attracted around twenty-five to thirty thousand visitors.

	Moscow			
Year	Date	Headliner	Cosmos Stage Acts	Chemical Stage Acts
2013	Friday, June 28	Limp Bizkit	Limp Bizkit; Louna; Poets of the Fall	–
2013	Saturday, June 29	The Killers	The Killers; Mumiy Troll; Justice; White Lies; Crystal Fighters; Anna Pingina	Everything Is Made in China; Tomorrow's World; Ladytron
2013	Saturday, June 29, Night	Pendulum	–	Pendulum (DJ-set & Verse); DJ Fresh & Messy MC; Robin Axford; Denis A
2013	Sunday, June 30	Zemfira	Zemfira; Paramore; Crystal Castles; Within Temptation; NOFX	Biting Elbows; Emika; Iamamiwhoami; Trentemøller; Moremoney

== 2014 ==
=== Moscow ===
The 2014 festival was held at All-Russia Exhibition Centre for three days from the June 27 to 29. The event was headlined by Marilyn Manson, The Prodigy, and Deftones.

	Moscow			
Year	Date	Headliner	Cosmos Stage Acts	Chemical Stage Acts
2014	Friday, June 27	Marilyn Manson (cancelled)	Marilyn Manson; Skillet; The Hardkiss	DJ Kazaryan
2014	Saturday, June 28	The Prodigy	The Prodigy; Enter Shikari; Hollywood Undead; Anacondaz; Морекорабли	Die Antwoord; Savant; Dope D.O.D. Therr Maitz; DJ Oguretz; Каспий; Volga; Robin Axford; DJ Algorythmik
2014	Sunday, June 29	Deftones	Deftones; Mastodon; Wolfmother; Karnivool; Philip H. Anselmo & The Illegals; Sedmaya Rasa	Lykke Li; Moderat; Yann Tiersen; Wild Beasts; SunSay

=== Kyiv ===
Kyiv held its own event in-line with the Park Live festival on the same dates. Initially, the festival was planned to be held at the Expocenter of Ukraine three days in a row, but due to the unfavorable political situation in the city, then a decision was made to change the format of the festival in Kyiv. The event was to be held at the Stereo Plaza concert club on June 26 and 27. The headliner of the first day was to be the Deftones and the headliners of the second day were to be Enter Shikari and Wolfmother.

Also on June 28 and 29 concerts of two previously planned groups (Wild Beasts and Skillet), as well as a special guest deTach, were to be held at the Sentrum and Stereo Plaza clubs as part of the Park Live Kyiv festival.

	Kyiv		
Year	Date	Headliner	Acts
2014	Thursday, June 26	Die Antwoord	Die Antwoord
2014	Friday, June 27	Deftones	Deftones; Enter Shikari; Wolfmother
2014	Saturday, June 28	Wild Beasts	Wild Beasts
2014	Sunday, June 29	Skillet	Skillet; Detach

== 2015 ==
In 2015, Park Live festival was held in Moscow at the Otkritie Arena stadium on June 19. The headliner of the day was the famous British band Muse. This was the first time the festival has reduced the number of days from three to one.

Year	Date	Headliner	Acts
2015	Friday, June 19	Muse	Muse; Incubus; Triggerfinger; Jack Action

== 2016 ==
=== Moscow ===
In 2016, the festival was again held in Moscow at the Otkrytie Arena stadium on July 9 and 10. The American rock band Red Hot Chili Peppers became the headliner of the first day of the festival, and the American singer Lana Del Rey became the headliner on July 10.

Year	Date	Headliner	Acts
2016	Saturday, July 9	Red Hot Chili Peppers	Red Hot Chili Peppers; Splean; The Kills; Nothing But Thieves
2016	Sunday, July 10	Lana Del Rey	Lana Del Rey; John Newman; Passenger; Two Door Cinema Club

== 2017 ==
In 2017, the festival was held in Moscow at the VEB Arena stadium on July 5. The headliner of the day was the American rock band System of a Down.

Year	Date	Headliner	Acts
2017	Wednesday, July 5	System of a Down	System of a Down; Three Days Grace; Twin Atlantic; Louna

== 2018 ==
In 2018, the festival changed its venue again. This time it was held on the territory of the Gorky Park on July 27, July 28 and 29. The headliner of the first day was a French DJ and producer David Guetta, the headliner of the second day was the British band Gorillaz (for the first time in Russia), the headliner of the third was Massive Attack. Ticket sales began on November 30, 2017.

On the second day of the festival, Gorillaz's performance was interrupted due to a thunderstorm and heavy rain.

Year	Date	Headliner	Acts
2018	Friday, July 27	David Guetta	David Guetta; Sofi Tukker
2018	Saturday, July 28	Gorillaz	Gorillaz; Kaleo; Tove Lo; Little Dragon
2018	Sunday, July 29	Massive Attack	Massive Attack; Bonobo; Tricky; Young Fathers

== 2019 ==
In 2019, the festival was held on the territory of the Gorky Park on July 12–14. The headliner of the first day was the British rock band Bring Me the Horizon, the headliner of the second day was Thirty Seconds to Mars, the headliner of the third was Die Antwoord. Ticket sales began on December 14, 2018.

On March 5, 2019, The Prodigy, which was supposed to become the headliner of the third day, announced the cancellation of all its concerts, including in Russia, in connection with the death of lead singer Keith Flint. On March 15, Park Live festival organisers announce new festival headliner – band from South Africa Die Antwoord.

Year	Date	Headliner	Acts
2019	Friday, July 12	Bring Me the Horizon	Bring Me the Horizon; Nothing But Thieves; SWMRS
2019	Saturday, July 13	Thirty Seconds to Mars	Thirty Seconds to Mars; Rag'n'Bone Man; AJR; Pale Waves
2019	Sunday, July 14	Die Antwoord	Die Antwoord Fever 333 Missio; MØ

== 2020 ==
The 2020 edition of the festival was cancelled due to the coronavirus pandemic.

The festival was originally scheduled to be held on July 17–19. My Chemical Romance was announced as headliners as part of their worldwide reunion tour.

Due to the cancellation, the 2021 edition was scheduled to take place over eight days, with artists originally announced for 2020 to perform in 2021 if possible.

== 2021 ==
The 2021 edition of the festival was cancelled due to the coronavirus pandemic.

== 2022 ==
In 2022, the Park Live festival was cancelled due to the Russian invasion of Ukraine after the event was already scheduled. The festival was to be held on the territory of the Luzhniki Olympic Complex on June 16–19 and July 7–10/14-17.

Year	Date	Headliner	Acts
2022	Friday, June 17	My Chemical Romance	My Chemical Romance; Sum 41
2022	Sunday, June 19	Placebo	Placebo
2022	Friday, July 8	Gorillaz	Gorillaz; Grandson
2022	Saturday, July 9	Deftones	Deftones; Fever 333; Poppy
2022	Sunday, July 10	Iggy Pop	Iggy Pop; Frank Carter and the Rattlesnakes
2022	Thursday, July 14	Five Finger Death Punch	Five Finger Death Punch
2022	Friday, July 15	Slipknot	Slipknot; Bullet For My Valentine
2022	Saturday, July 16	The Killers	The Killers; Royal Blood
2022	Sunday, July 17	TBA	Enter Shikari
