= HWC =

HWC or H.W.C. may refer to:

- Harwich Town railway station, a British railway station, station code
- Heavy Weight Champ, a defunct Australian heavy rock band
- Homeless World Cup, a football tournament
- Human–wildlife conflict
- "HWC" (song), a 2003 song by Liz Phair
