= Inadequate People 2 =

- Directed by: Roman Karimov
- Written by: Roman Karimov; Yana Lebedeva
- Produced by: Sergey Torchilin; Andrey Shishkanov; Roman Karimov
- Starring: Ilya Lyubimov; Ingrid Olerinskaya; Yevgeny Tsyganov; Mariya Goryacheva; Nikita Sanayev
- Cinematography: Anton Zhabin
- Edited by: Anna Tishkina; Svyatoslav Korolyov; Tatyana Magay
- Music by: Mikhail Chertishchev
- Production company: Trio Film
- Distributed by: MEGOGO Studios
- Release date: December 10, 2020 (Russia)
- Running time: 135 minutes
- Country: Russia
- Language: Russian

Inadequate People 2 (Russian: Неадекватные люди 2, romanized: Neadekvatnye lyudi 2) is a 2020 Russian romantic comedy-drama film directed by Roman Karimov, a sequel to the 2010 film Inadequate People.

It was theatrically released in Russia on December 10, 2020 by MEGOGO Studios.

== Plot ==
Christina lives with Vitaly, but their views on the world do not coincide. She devotes a lot of time to household chores, while he, meanwhile, is more and more at work, especially after a new assistant appeared in his office.

== Cast ==
- Ilya Lyubimov as Vitaly
- Ingrid Olerinskaya as Christina
- Yevgeny Tsyganov as Pavel Kozlov
- Mariya Goryacheva as Sonya
- Nikita Sanayev as Artyom
- Roman Khan as Iskhan
- Artyom Tsukanov as Nikolay
- Andrey Beburishvili as German
- Aleksey Goman as Denis
- Alexandra Bulychyova as Valeriya
