= Heavy Weight Champ =

Australian hard rock band

- Left to right: Luke Copeland, Dean Miller, Grant McCulloch

Background information
- Origin: Perth, Western Australia, Australia
- Genres: Hard rock
- Years active: 1999–2008
- Labels: Sic Squared/Phantom; MGM
- Past members: Brad Alexander; Dean Miller; Grant McCulloch; Luke Copeland

Heavy Weight Champ, sometimes written or seen as HWC, was an Australian heavy rock band from Perth formed in 1999. The founders were drummer Dean Miller, vocalist/lead guitarist Brad Alexander and vocalist/guitarist Grant McCullough, soon joined by bass guitarist Luke Copeland. The group released two extended plays, Two Triple Zero (August 2000) and Grey Filters (August 2002) and one studio album, Lo-Fi Funeral (8 May 2006), before disbanding in 2008. The band's early sounds were influenced by Tool, Deftones and Pearl Jam.

== History ==
Heavy Weight Champ's founding members, Brad Alexander (guitar/vocals), Dean Miller (drums), and Grant McCulloch (vocals/guitar) had played in several rock venues in Victoria in the early 1990s. In the later 1990s, whilst part of the alternative rock band Meld, they relocated first to Melbourne and then to Perth. After advertising for an additional member bass guitarist Luke Copeland joined the band, but in mid-1999 Alexander quit and returned to Victoria leaving HWC without a main guitarist. After auditioning numerous local players it was decided that instead McCullough would take over on lead guitar and the band would continue with just three members.

From later 1999 Heavy Weight Champ took part in several local competitions, including the Grosvenor Hotel's "Twenty Minutes of Fame" competition, before representing Western Australia at the National Campus Band Competition finals in Sydney. The band placed third in the competition, winning studio time. Heavy Weight Champ recorded their first extended play, Two Triple Zero, at Perth's Pinnacle Studios with producer Forester Savell. The five-track EP was released in August 2000 and appeared on the Australian Independent Record Companies Association charts Top 20 for almost a year.

HWC, supported by Karnivool, undertook a national tour in 2001 before returning to songwriting in 2002 and further developing their 'heavy sound'. Working with Jarrad Hearman from Watt Studios HWC trialled new tracks and in August 202 released a six-track EP called Grey Filters that gained them a nomination at the 2003 WAMi Awards.

== Lo-Fi Funeral and disbanding ==
Heavy Weight Champ began working on their debut studio album, Lo-Fi Funeral, in late 2005 at Perth Loop Studio with Jarrad Hearman as their producer. Material was recorded, tracked and mixed throughout November and December before the final mix sessions took place at Melbourne's Sing Sing Studios in March 2006. Their lead single "This Revolution" was released to radio in April, followed by the album release on 8 May 2006. Lo-Fi Funeral enjoyed critical and market acclaim.

Heavy Weight Champ played its final performance on 14 December 2007 in Perth before disbanding in early 2008. Singer-songwriter-guitarist Grant McCullough then formed The Siren Tower.

== Discography ==
=== Extended plays ===
Two Triple Zero

- Released: August 2000
- Format: CD
- Label: sic squared (Australia)/Phantom Music (sic002)
- Producer: Forrester Savel
- Tracks: "Two Triple Zero", "Down", "The Melancholy Overture", "Breach", "It Falls Away"

Grey Filters

- Released: August 2002
- Format: CD
- Label: sic squared (Australia)/MGM Distribution (sic010)
- Producer: Jarrad Hearman
- Tracks: "Filters (single edit)", "Grey (single edit)", "It Falls Away (live)", "The Melancholy Overture (live)", "Filters", "Grey"

=== Albums ===
Lo-Fi Funeral

- Released: 8 May 2006
- Format: CD
- Label: sic squared (Australia)/MGM Distribution (SIC017)
- Producer: Jarrad Hearman
- Singles: "This Revolution"

=== Other recordings ===
- Live set 06 - Live set broadcast on Triple J in 6 September, tracks performed were Worth Your Weight in Gold, Part Two: The Effect and Olympiad - as yet unreleased
- Bipolar - Demoed for the Lo-Fi Funeral sessions, as yet unreleased
- The Sic Sessions: Volume 1 – a two-disc split album with audio tracks and video by HWC, Subtruck and Headshot, released 2003.
- Live set 04 - Recorded for the Sic Sessions Volume One album, a collaboration between Heavy Weight Champ, Subtruck and Antistatic. Live tracks released on this album were Filters, Breach and Two Triple Zero
- Jeri Ryan - Demoed for the Two Triple Zero sessions and released on the 2000 Next Big Thing compilation

=== Videography ===
- Down – Directed by Chris Frey, released 2000
- Filters live – Directed by Andrew Ewing, released 2004
- Worth your Weight in Gold – Directed by Grant McCulloch, released 2006
- This Revolution – Directed by Grant McCulloch, released 2006
