= Londongrad (TV series) =

Russian crime comedy television series

- Genre: Crime comedy
- Written by: Mikhael Idov; Andrey Ryvkin; Elena Vanina; Lily Idova; Owen Matthews; Alexandra Smilyanskaya; Galina Rubinstein
- Directed by: Dmitriy Kiselev (1-4 episodes); Vitaly Shepelev (5-8 episodes); Vlad Nikolaev (9-16 episodes); Kirill Kuzin (17-28 episodes
- Starring: Nikita Yefremov; Ingrid Olerinskaya; Pavel Ilyin; Sergey Rost
- Composer: Vadim Nekrasov
- No. of seasons: 2
- No. of episodes: 28

Production
- Executive producers: Galina Sytsko; Georgi Rozinov; Vladimir Neklyudov
- Producers: Vyacheslav Murugov; Alexander Kessel
- Production locations: London, United Kingdom
- Cinematography: Denis Panov; Evgeny Kolskiy
- Running time: 48 minutes
- Production company: Sputnik Vostok Production

Original release
- Network: STS
- Release: 7 September – 22 October 2015

Londongrad (Russian: Лондонград) is a Russian crime comedy television series, the first series on Russian television to be shot in the capital of the United Kingdom.

The television series was created by Sputnik Vostok Production, commissioned by STS.

== Plot ==
Londongrad is a special agency which solves any problems that Russian people might face in the capital of the United Kingdom for a hefty fee; starting from ordinary tourists who lost their luggage, to the children of major officials arrested for mixing up the Winston Churchill monument with a public toilet. The owner and only employee of the agency is 27 year old Misha Kulikov (Nikita Yefremov), a mathematics genius and former Oxford student who dropped out five years ago and now takes up any orders as a kind of "fixer". But Russian clients of Kulikov in London have problems more of the domestic type than of criminal...

== Cast ==
- Nikita Yefremov as Misha Kulikov, founder and senior partner of the agency "Londongrad"
- Ingrid Olerinskaya as Alisa Zagorskaya, daughter of an oligarch, junior partner of the agency "Londongrad"
- Pavel Ilyin as Stepan Sysoev, driver of the agency "Londongrad"
- Sergey Rost as Boris Brikman, lawyer and main client of the agency
- Regina Miannik as Jeanne Brickman, Boris's wife, former model and aspiring actress
- Eugene Morozov as Oleg Dorokhov, Misha's friend from Oxford
- Kirill Dubrovitsky as Viktor Zagorsky, Alisa's father, a major Moscow construction businessman
- Alexander Ilyin as Alexey, Zagorsky's aide
- Andrei Kaverin as Alexey Danilin, a young and successful businessman, Zagorsky's main competitor
- Sergei Yushkevich as Gleb Tsygankov (man in a raincoat), Misha's mysterious creditor
- Artem Osipov as Pavel Kulikov, Misha's older brother, talented programmer from St. Petersburg
- Yelena Valyushkina as Pasha and Misha's mother, teacher from Manchester
- Sergei Lanbamin as Gennady Akimov, resident of the Foreign Intelligence Service at the Russian Embassy in the UK
- Nikita Panfilov as Vadim Komarov, chef at the restaurant "Less", friend of the agency
- Maria Zykova as hacker Sasha / FIS agent "Viktoria"
- Lev Prygunov as the tailor at the shop "Beretta", retired Foreign Intelligence Service resident and Akimov's mentor
- Gosha Kutsenko as Alexander Khanin, a popular writer
- Maksim Vitorgan as Sergey Oleinikov, junior cultural attaché at the Russian Embassy in the UK
- Vitali Kishchenko as Konstantin Agranovich, top manager of the conglomerate Neftrosekspo
- Dina Korzun as Maya Alksne, a nurse from Riga
- Alika Smekhova as Lidia, head of the escort agency
- Kirill Käro as Anton Chagin, a Russian buisnessman
- Evgeniya Dmitrieva as Margarita, an accompanist and friend of Stepan's
- Aleksandr Yatsko as Kirill Savenko, owner of a football club
- Alexander Kuznetsov as Ivo Andrews (Ivan Andreyev), a British dandy and a "former Russian"
- Yekaterina Volkova as Mary, Ivo Andrews's wife

== Ratings ==
The series premiered successfully on the STS channel. The first episode of Londongrad was watched by every fifth Moscow resident. The project, according to TNS Russia, became the leader in its slot in Moscow among all TV channels, with a share of 20.9% in the audience of 10-45 and a share of 27.5% among viewers aged 11 to 34. In the category of viewers older than four years old, the first season started with a rating of 2.5 and a share of 8.7, by the beginning of the second season the rating had dropped to 1.7, and the share had dropped to 5.4, after which the series ceased to be in the top 10 programs of STS. The reason for the decreased viewer interest was that the ruble dropped after the first season (1-16 episodes) and for financial reasons the rest of the episodes were no longer shot on location.
