= In Verses =

Studio album by Karnivool
- Released: 6 February 2026
- Genres: Progressive metal; progressive rock
- Length: 63:17
- Label: Cymatic
- Producer: Forrester Savell

Karnivool chronology
Asymmetry (2013)	In Verses (2026)

Singles from In Verses
- 1. "All It Takes" Released: 10 December 2021; 2. "Drone" Released: 26 June 2025; 3. "Aozora" Released: 16 September 2025; 4. "Opal" Released: 2 December 2025; 5. "Animation" Released: 27 January 2026

In Verses is the fourth studio album by the Australian rock band Karnivool, released on 6 February 2026 through Cymatic Records. It is their first album in thirteen years, following Asymmetry (2013).

At the 2026 ARIA Music Awards, it won Best Hard Rock/Heavy Metal Album.

The album was shortlisted for the 2026 Australian Music Prize.

== Background ==
In May 2019, Karnivool revealed that they had been in the process of recording their fourth studio album at Foxhole Studios in Perth.

== Promotion and release ==
On 10 December 2021, Karnivool released the single "All It Takes", produced by Forrester Savell. It is the band's first studio release since Asymmetry in 2013.

In late June 2025, Karnivool released the stand-alone single "Drone", their first new music since 2021's "All It Takes". The track was produced by longtime collaborator Forrester Savell and described by the band as "the sound of Karnivool entering a new era—a slow-cooked journey forged in the studio's heat, where every note was tested and tempered". Issued ahead of the band's Ad Complementum Australian tour, "Drone" was promoted as the first preview of their long-gestating fourth studio album. Said album, In Verses, was officially announced in September 2025. A music video for the song "Opal" was released on 17 December 2025 alongside the announcement that the album would be released on 6 February 2026.

== Track listing ==
All tracks are written by Drew Goddard, Mark Hosking, Steve Judd, Ian Kenny, and Jon Stockman; "Reanimation" written with Guthrie Govan.

In Verses track listing
No.	Title	Length
1.	"Ghost"	6:25
2.	"Drone"	4:59
3.	"Aozora"	6:26
4.	"Animation"	4:58
5.	"Conversations"	8:01
6.	"Reanimation" (featuring Guthrie Govan)	7:21
7.	"All It Takes" (2025 remastered version)	5:28
8.	"Remote Self Control"	5:40
9.	"Opal"	6:09
10.	"Salva"	7:50
Total length:		63:17

== Personnel ==
Credits adapted from Tidal.

=== Karnivool ===
- Drew Goddard – guitar
- Mark Hosking – guitar
- Steve Judd – drums
- Ian Kenny – vocals
- Jon Stockman – bass guitar

=== Additional contributors ===
- Forrester Savell – production, mixing, mastering
- Owen Thomas – engineering
- Guthrie Govan – guitar solo on "Reanimation"
- Mitch Finglas – additional string arrangement on "Opal"
- Charlotte Jacke and Lucy Warren – strings on "Opal"
- Michelle Smith – harp on "Opal"
- Grant Scroggie – bagpipes on "Salva"

== Charts ==
Chart performance for In Verses
Chart (2026)	Peak position
Australian Albums (ARIA)	1
Austrian Albums (Ö3 Austria)	44
Belgian Albums (Ultratop Flanders)	81
Belgian Albums (Ultratop Wallonia)	171
French Physical Albums (SNEP)	67
French Rock & Metal Albums (SNEP)	11
German Albums (Offizielle Top 100)	17
New Zealand Albums (RMNZ)	36
Scottish Albums (Official Charts)	28
Swiss Albums (Schweizer Hitparade)	21
UK Albums Sales (OCC)	16
UK Rock & Metal Albums (Official Charts)	2
