= Anyone but Them =

2018 film by Aleksandr Boykov

- Theatrical release poster
- Directed by: Aleksandr Boykov
- Written by: Aleksandr Boykov; Roman Nepomnyaschy; Andrei Kutuza
- Produced by: Maksim Rybakov
- Starring: Polina Maksimova; Yulia Khlynina; Denis Buzin; Sergey Yakimovich; Sergey Dubrov; Daniil Steklov; Yevgenia Turkova; Daria Khramtsova
- Cinematography: Aleksei Kupriyanov
- Edited by: Anton Novoseltsev
- Music by: Denis Surov; Anton Novoseltsev
- Production companies: Art Pictures Studio; BB Production / Promotion
- Distributed by: Central Partnership
- Release date: October 25, 2018
- Running time: 90 minutes
- Country: Russia
- Language: Russian
- Budget: $3.6 million
- Box office: $1 million

Anyone but Them (Russian: Только не они, romanized: Tolko ne oni) is a 2018 Russian sci-fi comedy film directed by Aleksandr Boykov. It stars Polina Maksimova and Yulia Khlynina.

== Plot ==
A group of deadbeat teenagers, among whom are Mathematician, Blonde, Rocker, Major, Loser and Psycho, wake up after a wild party and discover that the world has suddenly become different. They understand that they overslept the beginning of the apocalypse and find themselves in a dilapidated and deserted city, where danger lurks at every turn. But now the fate of all mankind is in their hands, and the guys have no choice but to join forces in the face of imminent danger.

Each of the characters has their own specific set of skills and talents, but each of them also have their own weaknesses. Soon after awakening, the gang discovers that they are not alone in the city. A bloodthirsty and invulnerable monster starts to hunt them, as well as a whole army of unknown thugs. They try to run away, but after a while they have to stop and engage in a fierce fight in order to prove themselves as heroes.

== Cast ==
- Polina Maksimova as a Blonde
- Yulia Khlynina as a Bitch
- Denis Buzin as a Psycho
- Sergey Yakimovich as Botan, a Mathematician guy
- Igor Yasulovich as Botan's grandfather, a scientist
- Sergey Dubrov as a Rocker
- Daniil Steklov as a Major
- Vladimir Steklov as Mayor, Major's father
- Yevgenia Turkova as a Loser
- Sergey Belogolovtsev as Loser's father
- Daria Khramtsova as a brutal girl
- Alexander Semchev as precinct
- Sergey Rost as gangster
- Maxim Konovalov as bandit leader
- Nikita Tarasov as psychologist
- Alexey Dmitriev as gangster
- Alexey Dadaev as Monster Understudy
- Andrey Amshinsky as alcoholic
- Yegor Sheremetyev as security guard
- Sergey Burunov as Professor Xavierov (only in the trailer, scene with him not include in film)

== Production ==
The shooting took place in the summer of 2014 in the Samara Region (Samara, Togliatti) and partially in Moscow.
