= Biting Elbows =

Russian indie rock band

- Origin: Moscow, Russia
- Genres: Indie rock, alternative rock, alternative metal
- Years active: 2008–present
- Label: Mystery of Sound
- Members: Ilya Naishuller; Ilia Kondratev; Alexei Zamaraev
- Past members: Garik Buldenkov
- Website: bitingelbows.com

Biting Elbows is a Russian indie rock band that was formed in 2008 in Moscow.

In 2012, they were an opening act for Guns N' Roses and Placebo's concerts in Moscow, played at Maxidrom. In 2013, they played at Park Live Festival.

The band is perhaps best known for its music videos for the songs "The Stampede" and "Bad Motherfucker". The videos, directed by frontman Ilya Naishuller, went viral because of their first-person perspective, special effects, and action. Naishuller directed a full-length first-person action/sci-fi/adventure film written by himself, Hardcore Henry (2015), starring Sharlto Copley and Danila Kozlovsky. Biting Elbows wrote the songs "My Woman" and "For the Kill" for the film's soundtrack, the former being featured in their second album, Shorten the Longing, which was released on June 26, 2020. Three other songs from the album ("Control", "Alone", and "Other Me") were featured in the Director's Cut edition of the video game Death Stranding which was released on September 24, 2021. The video game's designer Hideo Kojima referred to Naishuller as "a genius artist of 21st century music and video".

== Discography ==
=== Studio albums ===
Title	Album details
Biting Elbows	Released: November 13, 2011; Labels: Self-released; Formats: CD, digital download
Shorten the Longing	Released: June 26, 2020; Labels: Self-released; Formats: digital download, LP

=== Extended plays ===
Title	Details
Dope Fiend Massacre EP	Released: August 10, 2011; Labels: Self-released; Formats: CD, digital download
Bad Motherfucker	Released: March 12, 2013; Labels: Self-released; Formats: CD, digital download

=== Singles ===
Title	Year	Album
"The Stampede"	2011	Dope Fiend Massacre EP
"Bad Motherfucker"	2013	Bad Motherfucker
"Bullied Boy"	2015	non-album singles
"For the Kill"	2016	non-album singles
"Love Song"	2017	non-album singles
"Anarchy"	2018	non-album singles
"Heartache"	2019	Shorten the Longing
"Control"	2019	Shorten the Longing
"Ring The Bells"	2026	non-album single
