= Antistatic (band) =

Australian alternative/hard rock band

Background information
- Origin: Perth, Western Australia, Australia
- Genres: Alternative rock, hard rock
- Years active: 2003–2007
- Label: Sic Squared Records
- Past members: Drew; Basin; Brody
- Website: Official website

Antistatic were an Australian rock band formed in late 2003 in Perth, Western Australia.

== Highlights ==
=== 2003 ===
- Supported Queensland heavy metal outfit Sunk Loto on the Perth leg of their Between Birth and Death tour.

=== 2004 ===
- Nominated for four WAMi Awards - 'Best Heavy Rock/Metal Act', 'Best Video Clip', Best Drummer' and 'Best Record Label'.
- Represented Western Australia in the finals of the Australian National Campus Band Competition in Lismore, New South Wales.
- Selected to play at the 2004 WAMi Weekender Festival.
- Released debut EP, Still Life Portrait on Sic Squared Records.
- Supported The Butterfly Effect on the Perth leg of their national tour.
- Performed live at the Perth leg of the Big Day Out.

=== 2005 ===
- Supported Cog and The Butterfly Effect on the Western Australian leg of their national 'Bread & Circuses' tour.
- Supported End of Fashion.
- Performed together with Shihad, Frenzal Rhomb, Karnivool and 28 Days.
- The video clip for "Underwhelmed" screens on ABC TV's 'Rage'.

=== 2006 ===
- Selected as Triple J's next crop feature artist for Australian Music Month (November).
- Recorded and released the second EP Stand Up in Disguise.
- The video clip for "Stand Up in Disguise" screens on ABC TV's 'Rage'.
- Supported Karnivool and Blindspott on their national tour of Australia.
- Performed live at the Perth leg of the Big Day Out.
- Performed at the 2006 WAMi Saturday Spectacular alongside Gyroscope and Snowman.

=== 2007 ===
- Antistatic lands their first international support with US band Stone Sour, featuring Slipknot vocalist Corey Taylor.
- Nominated for the 2007 WAMi Awards for "Stand Up in Disguise" in the category of 'Most Popular Video'.
- Broke up in late 2007.
- Drummer Brody Simpson went on to form The Siren Tower.

== Press ==
Antistatic have received significant press coverage in magazines such as Xpress Rockus, and airplay of the band's latest single, "Stand Up in Disguise", on radio stations nationwide, including Nova in Perth, Melbourne and Sydney.

== Discography ==
- Still Life Portrait (EP) Sic Squared Records (2004)
- Stand Up in Disguise (EP) Sic Squared Records (2006)
