= Themata (album) =

Studio album by Karnivool
- Released: 7 February 2005
- Recorded: 2004; 2002 for "L1FEL1KE"
- Studio: Planet Studios, Perth; Metropolis Audio, Melbourne "L1FEL1KE" recorded at Pinnacle Studios, Perth
- Genre: Progressive metal; progressive rock; nu metal; alternative metal
- Length: 48:52
- Label: Bieler Bros.
- Producer: Forrester Savell; Karnivool

Karnivool chronology
Persona (2001)	Themata (2005)	Sound Awake (2009)

Singles from Themata
- 1. "L1FEL1KE" Released: September 6, 2002; 2. "Shutterspeed" Released: February 2005; 3. "Themata" Released: July 2005

Themata is the debut studio album by the Australian rock band Karnivool. The album was released independently on 7 February 2005, and was distributed via MGM Distribution. The album was released in the United States on 10 April 2007 via Bieler Bros. Records and in the UK on 7 May 2008 on the Happy Go Lucky label.

Three singles were released from the album, "L1FEL1KE" in 2003, "Themata" and "Shutterspeed", both in 2005.

== Composition ==
Metal Hammer said that Themata "clicked with a subculture that was barely post-nu metal, resurrecting [the progressive metal genre] for one last gasp with a Tool-inspired twist". Lead guitarist Drew Goddard played most of the drums on Themata, as well as contributing to the songwriting. The album's songs were composed in a combination of dropped-B and standard E tuning. Metal Forge magazine said that the album's songwriting demonstrated "a whole new spectrum of sophistication, with maturity and a growing confidence evident throughout". "Roquefort" features elements of funk, while "L1FEL1KE" shows influence from nu metal. Rolling Stone India said that the album's sound was defined by "Odd-time signatures, buzzing riffs and jagged guitar lines, soaring and harmonized vocals [and] cerebral writing". In a review of the band's later album, Sound Awake, AllMusic categorized the sound of Themata as "alternative/nu metal", while Rolling Stone India categorized the album's sound as "progressive rock/metal".

"Roquefort" was initially supposed to be recorded with a horns section, but the band did not have time to do this during the recording of the album. Harry Angus and Kieran Conrau of the Cat Empire later recorded trumpet and trombone respectively for the single version of "Roquefort". This version has been played live on a few occasions, including at Rock-It 2005, during the Triple J Hottest 100 on 26 January 2007, and at the 2010 Melbourne Big Day Out.Drew Goddard said the following regarding "Change", stating "'Change' wasn’t originally conceived as a two part song.

We had written about 60% of "Change" as a whole piece and were desperately trying to finish it in preproduction for inclusion on Themata, as we thought it was shaping up to be an absolute cracker. Due to the nature of the song, the time needed to spend on it and the time we didn’t have we decided do the thing that annoyed everyone so much, and chop it at the peak of the climax, and then finish the 2nd part for inclusion the next album. The title "Change" seemed fitting as this was the last song (mostly) written during the Themata sessions and almost signaled what we thought could be a change of direction on the next album.… It seems we were pretty spot on going by the general feel of the new material. It just wouldn’t have found its place on Themata.

== Reception ==
Professional ratings
Review scores
Source	Rating
Melodic.net	4/5 stars
The Metal Forge	8/10 stars
Metal Storm	7/10
PopMatters	6/10

Themata received generally positive reviews upon release.

Metal Storm wrote that the album is better than most nu metal albums of the time, but also stated that the album would only find success with fans of the genre and criticized some parts of the album for a lack of originality.

A more mixed review came from Andrew Blackie of PopMatters. Blackie praised the band's musical style for not following the retro rock sound of other Australian bands such as Jet, Wolfmother, and the Vines. Outside of opener "C.O.T.E." and closing track "Change (Part 1)", the review called the album "a mess of unmemorable riffs and the dull experimental slab here and there" and unfavorably compared Kenny's vocals to Fred Durst.

In a retrospective review to coincide with the album's 10th anniversary, Nick Hartman of Happy Magazine praised the band's ability to merge different metal trends of the '90s and '00s together into a coherent style. However, Hartman also noted that Themata was "a sore thumb" in the band's discography due to the more progressive rock/metal shift on later releases.

== Track listing ==
All tracks are written by Karnivool (Ian Kenny, Drew Goddard, Mark Hosking, and Jon Stockman).

No.	Title	Length
1.	"C.O.T.E."	5:50
2.	"Themata"	5:40
3.	"Shutterspeed"	3:46
4.	"Fear of the Sky"	5:16
5.	"Roquefort"	4:38
6.	"L1FEL1KE"	4:40
7.	"Scarabs"	2:10
8.	"Sewn and Silent"	4:12
9.	"Mauseum"	3:54
10.	"Synops"	4:53
11.	"Omitted for Clarity"	0:20
12.	"Change (Part 1)"	3:28
Total length:		48:52

== Charts ==
Chart (2015)	Peak position
Australian Albums (ARIA)	41

== Certifications ==
Region	Certification	Certified units/sales
Australia (ARIA)	Gold	35,000^{‡}
^{‡} Sales+streaming figures based on certification alone.

== Release details ==
Region	Date	Label	Format	Catalog
Australia	7 February 2005	Independent/MGM Distribution	CD	KARN001
United States	20 November 2007	Bieler Bros.	CD	70015
United States	20 November 2007	Bieler Bros.	Digital	
United Kingdom	7 May 2008	Happy Go Lucky	CD	070015

== Personnel ==
Karnivool

- Ian Kenny – lead vocals
- Drew Goddard – guitar, drums, backing vocals, string arrangements
- Mark Hosking – guitar, backing vocals
- Jon Stockman – bass, unclean vocals

Additional

- Ray Hawkins – drums on track 6
- Paul David-Goddard – spoken word on track 6
- Emma Green – spoken word on track 6
- Novac Bull – additional vocals on track 2
- Leigh Miller – string arrangements on track 2
- Eve Silver – string arrangements on track 8
- Ezekiel Ox – whistling and castanets on track 5

String section

- Eve Silver
- Elise Turner
- Georgina Cameron
- Lathika Vithanage
