= Sound Awake =

Studio album by Karnivool
- Released: 5 June 2009
- Recorded: Blackbird / Kingdom Studios, Perth, Western Australia
- Genres: Alternative metal; progressive metal; progressive rock
- Length: 72:10
- Label: Cymatic
- Producer: Forrester Savell

Karnivool chronology
Themata (2005)	Sound Awake (2009)	Asymmetry (2013)

Singles from Sound Awake
- 1. "Set Fire to the Hive" Released: 28 April 2009; 2. "All I Know" Released: 9 November 2009

Sound Awake is the second studio album by the Australian progressive rock band Karnivool, released in Australia on 5 June 2009. At the J Awards of 2009, the album was nominated for Australian Album of the Year.

At the 2010 West Australian Music Industry Awards, the album won Most Popular Album.

== Recording ==
The album follows a four-year gap since their debut studio album Themata in 2005. Sound Awake was produced by Forrester Savell (The Butterfly Effect, Dallas Frasca) and recorded at Perth's Blackbird and Kingdom Studios over several months. It was later mixed at Melbourne's Sing Sing Studios and mastered by Tom Coyne (DJ Shadow, The Roots) at Sterling Sounds in New York City.

== Composition ==
Karnivool – "New Day"
A 28 second sample of Karnivool's "New Day", featuring an instrumental hard rock section that abruptly transitions into a verse.

AllMusic wrote that "The core of alternative/nu metal that brought the group success on its debut album, Themata, still holds throughout the bulk of [Sound Awake], but there are little touches of something else." The songs on Sound Awake are longer than those on Themata, and more in common stylistically with progressive rock than any of the band's previous work. In an interview, bassist Jon Stockman describes the differences between Sound Awake and the band's previous album, Themata:

The main difference would be that the bulk of Themata was written by Drew and arranged by a few of us whereas both the writing and arranging for Sound Awake was much more of a collaborative effort from everyone. In addition to that, a lot of Themata was written straight to a recording session before ever being played as a band, whereas we pretty much wrote most of the Sound Awake in a jam-room environment.

— Jon Stockman

== Release ==
The name of the album was conceived by Drew Goddard and the album cover artwork was undertaken by graphic designers, Joe Kapiteyn and Chris Frey.

We originally wanted a foldout design but found that the standard book worked better with the number of artwork pictures that we had in mind. In the end, the final cover was a mixture of input from all the band and Joe.

— Jon Stockman

The album was released on 5 June 2009 through Cymatic Records and distributed by Sony Music Australia. The first single from the album, "Set Fire to the Hive", was released prior to it, on 28 April 2009, with a video being released on 8 May. The second single, "All I Know", was released on 9 November 2009, along with an accompanying music video.

Sound Awake was played as the 'feature album' on radio station Triple J. They played the entire album, one song per day, with some songs featuring short spoken introductions by members of the band. On 17 July 2009 it was nominated for a J Award – 'Australian Album of the Year'.

== Reception ==
Professional ratings
Review scores
Source	Rating
AllMusic	4/5 stars
Bloody Disgusting	4/5 stars
Kerrang!	4/5 stars
Sputnikmusic	4.5/5 stars
Metal Storm	4.35/5 stars

Adam Greenberg of Allmusic felt that often the band sounded too similar to the work of Tool, writing, "when Karnivool are simply innovating and trying out new elements, they turn out to be quite capable. They just need that last push to make the album really something special." Jacob Royal of Sputnikmusic complimented Karnivool's experimentation and musicianship, writing that many of the tracks build in dynamics well and feature complex percussive arrangements from drummer Steve Judd. He considered "Illumine" and "Simple Boy" among the weakest points of the album, but praised most of the other featured songs. Jonathan Barkan of Bloody Disgusting compared Sound Awake to the work of Tool, Porcupine Tree, Muse and The Mars Volta, "while still being able to sound original and unique". Heavy metal news website Metal Storm left a positive review, describing the album as "stunning...varied and regularly expansive, yet grounded and avoiding musical excess".

The album debuted at number two on the ARIA Album Charts on 15 June 2009, behind The Black Eyed Peas' The E.N.D.. It was also the top independent release in Australia, debuting at number one on the AIR Charts. The album received Gold certification for sales in Australia, and in 2012 was voted the #1 album of the years 2000–2009 by Heavy Blog Is Heavy.

== Track listing ==
All tracks are written by Karnivool

Sound Awake
No.	Title	Length
1.	"Simple Boy"	5:47
2.	"Goliath"	4:37
3.	"New Day"	8:20
4.	"Set Fire to the Hive"	4:28
5.	"Umbra"	7:50
6.	"All I Know"	4:53
7.	"The Medicine Wears Off"	1:49
8.	"The Caudal Lure"	6:16
9.	"Illumine"	5:12
10.	"Deadman"	12:04
11.	"Change (Part 2)"	10:47

Notes "Deadman" does not run until 12:04, it stops at 10:08, and after 4 seconds of silence, at minute 10:12 begins a hidden track: it is a re-recorded version of the closing song from Themata, "Change (Part 1)", which then segues into "Change (Part 2)". The re-recorded version of "Change (Part 1)" contains vibraphone instead of the ambience found on the Themata version, and only runs for 1:57, compared to the Themata version, which run to 3:28. It also contains slightly modified lyrics from the original.

== Personnel ==
Credits are adapted from the album's liner notes.

Band

- Drew Goddard – guitar, backing vocals
- Ian Kenny – vocals, acoustic guitar on "Change"
- Jon Stockman – bass
- Mark Hosking – guitar, backing vocals
- Steve Judd – drums, percussion

Additional musicians

- Grant McCulloch – additional vocals on"Deadman"
- Jason Bunn – viola on "Umbra"
- Javin Sun – additional vocals on "Goliath"
- Jessop Maticevski-Shumack – additional vocals on "Goliath"
- Jules Pacy-Cole – additional vocals on "Goliath"
- Louise Conray – additional percussion on "Simple Boy" and "Change"
- Prue Glenn – conductor
- Sam Pilot Kickett – didgeridoo on "Change"
- Talfryn Dawlings – additional vocals on "Goliath"
- Zak Hanyn – additional vocals on "Goliath"

Production

- Chris Frey – concept and design
- Dave Parkin – mixing on "The Medicine Wears Off" and "The Caudal Lure"
- Forrester Savell – producer and mixing
- Karnivool – producer
- Nicole Norelli – photography
- Mick Rafferty – mix assistant
- Tom Coyne – mastering

== Charts ==
=== Weekly charts ===
Chart (2009)	Peak position
Australian Albums (ARIA)	2

=== Year-end charts ===
Chart (2009)	Position
Australian Albums (ARIA)	82

== Certifications ==
Region	Certification	Certified units/sales
Australia (ARIA)	Gold	35,000^{^}
^{^} Shipments figures based on certification alone.
