= Hostel (2021 film) =

2021 Russian drama film directed by Roman Vasyanov

- Theatrical release poster
- Directed by: Roman Vasyanov
- Written by: Roman Vasyanov; Ekaterina Bogomolova; Pavel Selukov; Darya Selukova; Alexei Ivanov
- Based on: A Hostel on Spilled Blood by Alexei Ivanov
- Produced by: Artyom Vasilyev; Igor Mishin
- Starring: Gennady Vyrypaev; Irina Starshenbaum; Marina Vasilyeva; Nikita Yefremov; Ilya Malanin; Yuliya Aug
- Cinematography: Aleksandr Aleksandrov
- Edited by: Sergey Ivanov
- Production companies: Kinopraym; Metrafilms; Columbia Pictures
- Distributed by: Sony Pictures Releasing
- Release dates: June 2021 (Shanghai International Film Festival); 2021 (Russia)
- Running time: 122 minutes
- Country: Russia
- Language: Russian

Hostel (Russian: Общага, romanized: Obschaga) is a 2021 Russian teen drama film written and directed by Roman Vasyanov, adaptation of Alexei Ivanov's novel A Hostel on Spilled Blood (ru). It stars Gennady Vyrypaev, Irina Starshenbaum, Marina Vasilyeva, Nikita Yefremov, and Ilya Malanin.

It is unrelated to the 2005 American film series of the same name by Sony's subsidiary Screen Gems. The film premiered in June 2021 at the 24th Shanghai International Film Festival. The premiere took place online on September 26, 2021, at the online cinema Kion (ru) and KinoPoisk HD.

== Plot ==
The film is set in Sverdlovsk in 1984. A group of young people live in a hostel, and suddenly one student commits suicide, which radically changes the lives of friends.

== Cast ==
- Gennady Vyrypaev as Pavel Zabelin (Zabela), a student
- Irina Starshenbaum as Nelly Karavaeva, a female student
- Marina Vasilyeva as Sveta Leushina, a female student
- Nikita Yefremov as Vanya Simakov, a student
- Ilya Malanin as Igor Kaminsky, a student
- Yuliya Aug as Olga Botova, the commandant of the hostel

=== Rest of cast listed alphabetically ===
- Alyona Mikhaylova as Kira Kolesnikova, a female student
- Aleksandr Kudrenko as Renat, Olga's husband, caretaker
- Yevgeny Serzin as Yan Gaponov, Komsomol organizer
- Mariya Ivaschenko as Ira
- Lyubov Konstantinova as Nadya
- Vitaly Isakov as an investigator
- Vladislav Stavropoltsev as Bumagin
- Kseniya Plyusnina as Dasha Gorokhova
- Konstantin Plotnikov as Zhenya Gorokhov
- Tatyana Trudova as Mila
- Kirill Frolov as Generozov
- Anna Levit as a girl

== Production ==
The film was directed by cinematographer Roman Vasyanov, who first appeared in a new capacity. According to him, he had long wanted to take part in the film adaptation of "Hostel on the Blood" (ru) as a cameraman, but due to the lack of a director he decided to take on this function. Vasyanov also became one of the authors of the script.
