= Ilya Lyubimov =

Russian actor

- Илья Любимов
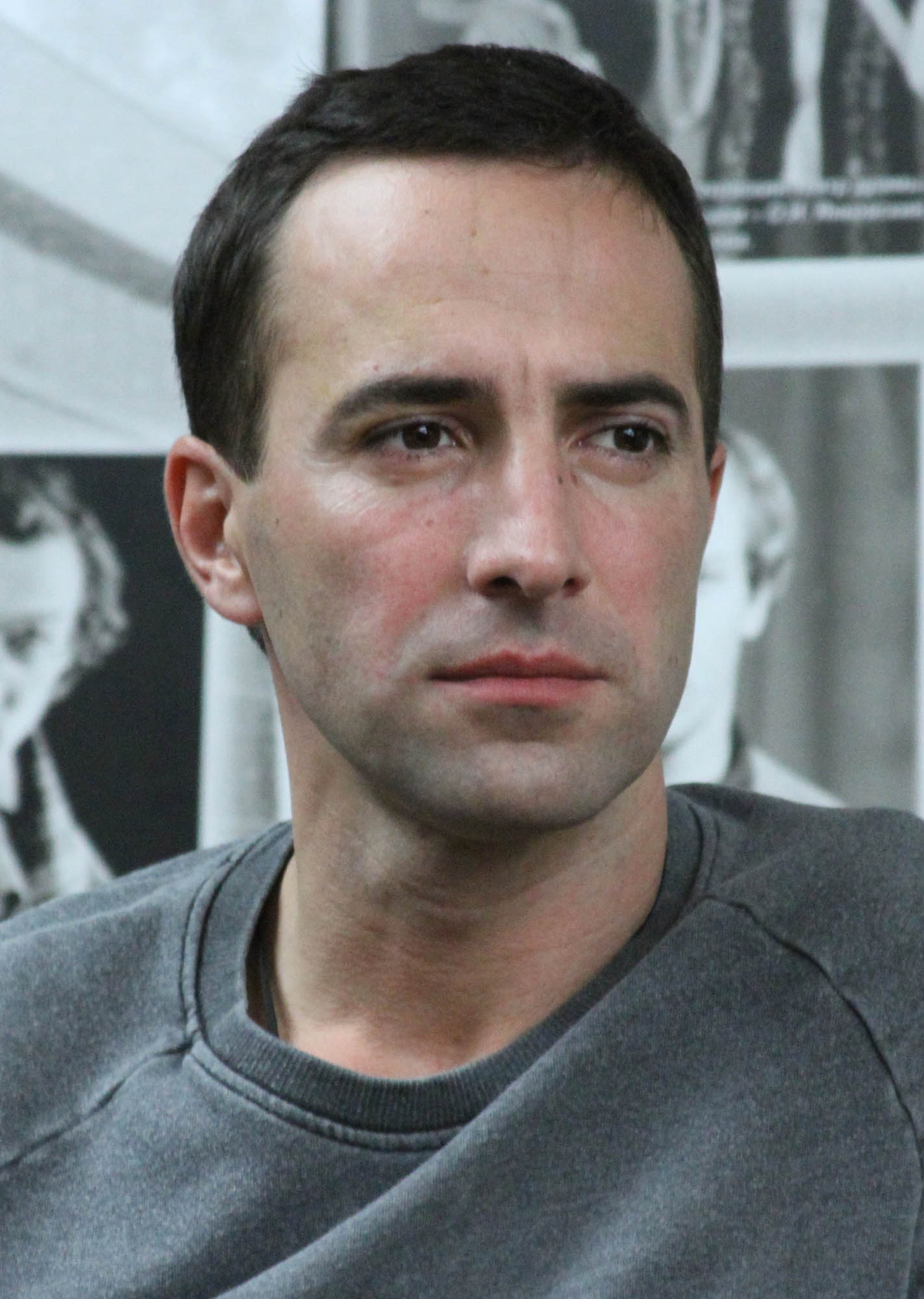
- Ilya Lyubimov is an actor
- Born: Ilya Petrovich Lyubimov; 21 February 1977; Moscow, RSFSR, USSR
- Occupation: Actor
- Years active: 1993–present

Ilya Lyubimov (Russian: Илья́ Петро́вич Люби́мов; born February 21, 1977) is a Russian theatre actor. He appeared in more than 60 films.

== Biography ==
Lyubimov was born in Moscow, Russian SFSR, Soviet Union (now Russia). In 1993 he entered the directing department of Russian Institute of Theatre Arts.

== Selected filmography ==
Year	Title	Role	Notes
2003	Bimmer	Kolya	
2010	Inadequate People	Vitali	
2020	Inadequate People 2	Vitali	
2020	Wolf	Leonid Goldman	TV
2025	The Poet; The Prophet. The Story of Alexander Pushkin	Vasily Zhukovsky	Post-production
