= Sergey Rost =

Russian actor and screenwriter (born 1965)

- Сергей Рост
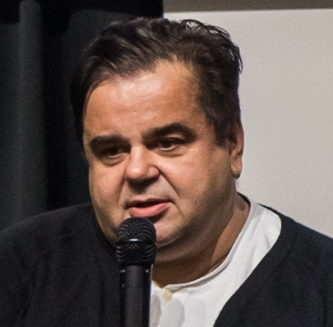
- Rost in 2017
- Born: Sergey Anatolyevich Titivin; March 3, 1965 (age 61); Leningrad, RSFSR, USSR
- Citizenship: Soviet Union (until 1991); Russia
- Occupation: Actor
- Years active: 1996–present

Sergey Anatolyevich Rost, né Titivin (Russian: Серге́й Анато́льевич Рост; Russian: Серге́й Анато́льевич Титивин; born March 3, 1965) is a Russian actor, screenwriter, television and radio.

== Biography ==
Born March 3, 1965, in a family of engineers Raisa Ivanovna (née Netkova) and Anatoly Fyodorovich Titivin. His mother hails from Ukraine, part of the family lives in Melitopol. Has Bulgarian roots. Named in honor of Sergey Yesenin. He graduated from the Leningrad Theatre Institute as a theater director.

I worked with Dmitry Nagiyev radio Modern.

Great popularity earned him a humorous program Look Out! Modern, In which he not only played both male and female roles, but also in collaboration with Anna Parmas wrote over 300 scripts to her. In January 2004, Look Out! Modern 2 was closed after the controversy erupted with the actor of the transfer Dmitry Nagiyev, who suggested growth remained now only a writer, and the role of the program, the project Nagiyev will be invited to perform stars of cinema and show business. Growth is not agreed with the partner offer. According to another version, the cause of the differences is the financial contradictions.

His wife Olga, by profession a journalist. Daughter Alisa (born March 13, 2011).

== Filmography ==
- 1996—1999: Look Out! Modern as different roles
- 1997: Purgatory as Bogdan Klyots
- 1999—2000: Full Modern! as different roles
- 1999: Streets of Broken Lights as Vitya
- 2001—2004: Look Out! Modern 2 as different roles
- 2001: Detectives as waiter
- 2002: Two Fates as photographer
- 2003: Mongoose as informant Suslikov
- 2005: Two Fates 2 as Edik
- 2005: The Right to Love as Mikhail Bondarev
- 2005: Queen of the Petrol Station 2 as DJ Accident
- 2007: When it Does Not Expect as Andrey
- 2007: Reserve Fear as Coyote
- 2008: Kings Can Do Everything as Vadim Gudashkin, hairdresser
- 2009: My as Garik
- 2009: Keys to Happiness as Producer
- 2010: Liteyny, 4 as Anton
- 2011: Trap for Pinocchio (was not completed)
- 2011: Last Minute as Georgy Alexandrovich, film director
- 2011: Secrets of Investigation as Stanislav Valeryevich Alsufiev
- 2011: Taxi as Valerik
- 2012: Baby as Barkov
- 2014: Univer. New Dorm as editor in chief
- 2014: Turn on the Turn as Nikolai Baskov's assistant
- 2015: Londongrad as Boris Brickman, lawyer
- 2015: SOS, Santa Claus, or Everything will come true! as Yakov Ilyich Scriabin
- 2015: Happiness is... as policeman
- 2016: Snoop as Arkady Vasilyevich Chubarov
- 2017: Saving Pushkin as publisher
- 2018: Story of One Appointment (episode)
- 2018: Anyone but Them as gangster
- 2018: Let's Get A Divorced! as landlord
- 2021: Vertinsky as Vladimir Solomatin

=== Voice ===
- 2001: Shallow Hal as Hal Larson (Russian voice)
- 2016: Police Department as director of the theater
