= Sic Squared Records =

Australian record label

- Founded: 1999
- Founder: Scott Adam
- Distributor(s): MGM Distribution
- Genre: Heavy rock
- Country of origin: Australia
- Location: North Perth, Western Australia
- Official website: Sic Squared Records Official Website

Sic Squared Records is an Australian independent record label established in 1999 to promote Western Australian heavy rock bands.

== History ==
Founded by Scott Adam, the label's debut release was by local band T-cells, the label gained nation recognition with the release of the hugely successful Heavy Weight Champ debut EP, Two Triple Zero in mid 2000.

With over a dozen releases so far, Sic Squared Records has assisted the musical careers of bands such as Local Pricks and Karnivool, releasing the band's Persona EP in March 2001, as well as putting out compilation albums featuring an array of unsigned local acts. Sic Squared Records are distributed nationally and internationally by MGM Distribution.

2004 saw new life breathed into Sic Squared Records with the appointment of a new manager for the label, Lukas Best, with a number of releases, Still Life Portrait by Antistatic, Ballbaring by Subtruck and 451 by Headshot. In April the label issued a compilation album, The Sic Sessions, Volume One, by Various Artists.

In 2005 and 2007 the label received nominations for 'Best WA Record Label' at the West Australian Music Industry Awards.

== Artists ==
- Antistatic
- Subtruck
- Headshot
- Heavy Weight Champ

== See also ==
- Lists of record labels
