= Ingrid Olerinskaya =

Russian actress and model (born 1992)

- Ингрид Олеринская
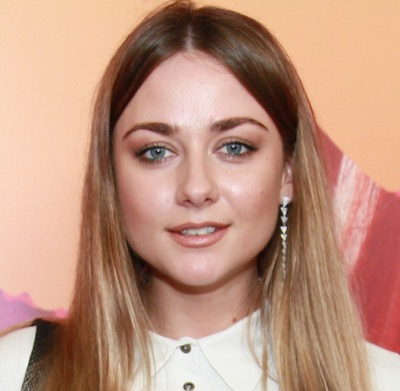
- Olerinskaya in 2021
- Born: Ingrid Andreevna Olerinskaya; March 14, 1992 (age 34); Ryazan, Russia
- Citizenship: Russian
- Occupations: Actress; model
- Years active: 2009–present

Ingrid Andreevna Olerinskaya (Russian: И́нгрид Андре́евна Олери́нская; born March 14, 1992) is a Russian actress and model who became famous after her debut in the film by Roman Karimov's Inadequate People (2011). She also starred in the 2015 television series Londongrad.

== Biography ==
Ingrid Olerinskaya was born in 1992 in Ryazan, Russia. Ingrid has a sister Paulina Olerinskaya.

Until 2007 she studied in Nizhny Novgorod in the general education high school, and then moved to Moscow. She graduated from high school at the International University in Moscow. Received Moscow State Pedagogical University (Moscow State Pedagogical University) at the Faculty of Geography. She is currently on leave for admission to the university theater.

== Filmography ==
- 2010: Inadequate People as Kristina
- 2015: Londongrad as Alisa Zagorskaya
- 2017: You All Infuriate Me as Karina (episode 8)
- 2020: Inadequate People 2 as Kristina
- 2022: Young Man as Lera

=== Voice ===
- 2020: Cyberpunk 2077 as Judy Alvarez (Russian voice)

== Awards ==
- Diploma For the Аctor's Duet on the Vyborg Film Festival Window to Europe (2010).
