= Heads of State (film) =

2025 film by IIya Naishuller

- Release poster
- Directed by: Ilya Naishuller
- Screenplay by: Josh Appelbaum; André Nemec; Harrison Query
- Story by: Harrison Query
- Produced by: Peter Safran; John Rickard
- Starring: John Cena; Idris Elba; Priyanka Chopra; Carla Gugino; Jack Quaid; Stephen Root; Paddy Considine
- Cinematography: Ben Davis
- Edited by: Tom Harrison-Read
- Music by: Steven Price
- Production companies: The Safran Company; Potboiler; Big Indie Pictures
- Distributed by: Amazon MGM Studios (via Prime Video)
- Release date: July 2, 2025
- Running time: 113 minutes
- Country: United States
- Language: English
- Budget: $158.4 million

Heads of State is a 2025 action comedy film directed by Ilya Naishuller. It stars Idris Elba as the British Prime Minister and John Cena as the President of the United States, two world leaders who are forced to work together after becoming targets of a foreign adversary. The supporting cast includes Priyanka Chopra, Jack Quaid, Paddy Considine, Stephen Root, and Carla Gugino.

The film was released worldwide on July 2, 2025, by Amazon MGM Studios via Prime Video.

== Plot ==
A joint team of MI6 agents and CIA officers, led by senior agent Noel Bisset, are in Buñol, Spain, during the La Tomatina festival, chasing Russian arms dealer Viktor Gradov. Bisset's team are ambushed and killed, and Gradov acquires a link to ECHELON, the global surveillance program used by the Anglosphere intelligence alliance Five Eyes.

Sam Clarke, the UK Prime Minister, receives a state visit from the newly elected United States President Will Derringer, a former action movie star. The two do not get along due to their differing views on leadership, and a public argument breaks out between them during a joint press conference. Their respective aides Quincy and Bradshaw convince them to fly to the upcoming NATO summit in Trieste together aboard Air Force One to present a united front to the world.

During the flight, Air Force One is shot down by Gradov's men. Clarke and Derringer escape using parachutes but are stranded in Belarus and presumed dead by the rest of the world. Realizing that someone in their inner circle has betrayed them to Gradov, the two journey to a safe house in Warsaw with CIA officer Marty Comer. Gradov's men, led by assassins Sasha and Olga, attack the safehouse. Comer kills the majority of the attackers before being shot in the head. Clarke and Derringer escape with the help of Bisset, who survived Gradov's attack in Spain.

Bisset tells Clarke and Derringer that the NATO summit has been derailed due to Gradov's hacker Hammond breaking in to the Echelon and leaking national security files to the public, exposing decades of espionage among various NATO members. Derringer also learns that Clarke and Bisset were in a relationship prior to Clarke running for office. The three embark for the summit in Italy by train, where they are attacked by another of Gradov's assassins. Hammond, tired of being forced to work for Gradov, kills the assassin but is mortally wounded. He instructs the trio to go to his former office in Zadar, Croatia, to find out who betrayed them. They locate old chat logs that implicate Derringer's aide Bradshaw. They are again attacked by Gradov's assassins, and Clarke is seemingly killed in an explosion.

Derringer and Bisset arrive in Trieste for the summit, where they learn that the real traitor is Vice President Elizabeth Kirk, who implicated Bradshaw as a false trail. The assassins working for her and Gradov chase Derringer and Bisset through Trieste. The two are saved by Clarke, who survived the explosion. Olga is killed when her grenade launcher goes off by accident during the chase, and the trio arrives at the summit in time to prevent the dissolution of NATO at the hands of Kirk. Derringer confronts her, but she is shot and killed by Gradov, whose assassins assault the summit. Bisset fights and kills Sasha, while Clarke and Derringer pursue Gradov, killing him when the latter throws a statue at his helicopter, causing it to crash.

Two months later, the relationships within NATO have been repaired, and Clarke and Derringer have become close friends. In a mid-credits scene, Comer is revealed to have survived the attack in Warsaw due to a metal plate in his head and is approached by Bisset while attempting to pick up women at a bar.

== Cast ==
- Idris Elba as Sam Clarke, the prime minister of the United Kingdom and a veteran of the British Army
- John Cena as Will Derringer, the president of the United States famous for his previous career as an action movie star
- Priyanka Chopra as Noel Bisset, a senior MI6 agent
- Jack Quaid as Marty Comer, a CIA officer and station agent in Warsaw
- Paddy Considine as Viktor Gradov, a Russian arms dealer
- Stephen Root as Arthur Hammond, a hacker for Gradov
- Carla Gugino as Elizabeth Kirk, the vice president of the United States
- Sarah Niles as Simone Bradshaw, White House chief of staff
- Richard Coyle as Quincy Harrington, Downing Street chief of staff
- Clare Foster as Cat Derringer, the first lady of the United States
- Katrina Durden as Olga the Killer, an assassin working for Gradov
- Aleksandr Kuznetsov as Sasha the Killer, an assassin working for Gradov
- Sharlto Copley as Thomas "Coop" Cooper, a CIA officer and Bisset's counterpart
- Adrian Lukis as Jack Gordon, a reporter
- Ingeborga Dapkunaite as Belarusian farmer
- Andrei Dementiev as Belarusian gopnik
- Steven Cree as Crasson, President Derringer's lead Secret Service agent
- Claudia Doumit in an unnamed cameo
- Dan Abrams as himself, a host of Dan Abrams Live

== Production ==
It was announced in October 2020 that Amazon Studios had picked up the project, which would star Idris Elba and John Cena, the pair having previously co-starred together in The Suicide Squad (2021). Two years later in October 2022, Ilya Naishuller was hired to direct the film. In April 2023, Priyanka Chopra joined the cast. Paddy Considine, Stephen Root, Carla Gugino, Jack Quaid, Sarah Niles and Richard Coyle would be added to the cast the following month.

Filming began in London in May 2023. Filming continued in Liverpool's St George's Hall in June 2023. Later in July and August, location shooting moved to Trieste for some chase scenes. In May 2024, additional scenes were shot in Belgrade, Serbia. The studio spent $189.7 million to produce the film, with the net budget being $154.8 million after a $31.3 million tax incentive return from the UK government.

== Release ==
Heads of State was released on Prime Video on July 2, 2025.

== Reception ==
On the review aggregator website Rotten Tomatoes, 68% of 114 critics' reviews are positive, with an average rating of 5.9/10. The website's consensus reads: "Heads of State's lighthearted handling of geopolitics may be too cute by half, but the comedic alliance between Idris Elba and John Cena remains strong in this slick action flick." Metacritic, which uses a weighted average, assigned the film a score of 57 out of 100, based on 19 critics, indicating "mixed or average" reviews.

Matt Zoller Seitz of RogerEbert.com gave the film two and a half out of four stars and wrote, "All in all, it's stupid fun, done with enough panache that its thin story and sometimes too-glib attitude doesn't hurt it too much."
