= Set Fire to the Hive =

Single by Karnivool

from the album Sound Awake
- Released: 28 April 2009
- Length: 4:29
- Label: Cymatic/Sony Music
- Songwriters: I. Kenny, M. Hosking, A. Goddard, J. Stockman, S. Judd
- Producer: Forrester Savell

Karnivool singles chronology
"Themata" (2005)	"Set Fire to the Hive" (2009)	"All I Know" (2010)

Music video
- "Set Fire to the Hive" on YouTube

"Set Fire to the Hive" is a song by Australian rock band Karnivool, released in April 2009 as the lead single from their second studio album, Sound Awake.

== Background ==
The song was debuted live at the Aeons Tour in 2008, was confirmed to be the first single on the band's MySpace and was released on 28 April 2009. The earlier-confirmed music video was released on 8 May 2009 and has received significant airplay on both Channel V and radio station Triple J.

The song peaked at #11 on the AIR Top 20 singles charts.

The song, musically, is substantially different from Karnivool's previous work. The song has been described as the 'black sheep' of the album, with guitarist, Drew Goddard acknowledging as much.

As a musician, I never like to be writing within a comfort zone, because you invariably write music which sounds comfortable. Set Fire To The Hive was something we wrote from a weird place, where we were all frustrated by external stuff, and you can hear it in the song – it’s like we’re all going ‘FAARRK!!’ It’s definitely the heaviest moment, the black sheep of the album.

— Drew Goddard

In an interview bassist Jon Stockman describes the song as being

it’s very much a direct kind of ’sonic’ call to arms, challenging people to look at how much control we have over our own society as well as our own lives and to remind people that we live in a democracy, and that that kind of system of government has certain rights that we should always be entitled to.

— Jon Stockman

== Music video ==
The music video for the song was released on YouTube on 8 May 2009 eleven days after the song's release on the band's MySpace profile. It is Karnivool's fourth official video, after Shutterspeed on YouTube (2005), Themata on YouTube (2005), and L1FEL1KE on YouTube (2003).

The music video features the band playing in what appears to be a cube. To match with the first line, "I don't know what's wrong, but I'm on fire", Ian Kenny's arm is on fire. With the first lyrics of the verse, "We're slaves, in this medicated cage", A bird cage appears on Ian Kenny's head.

== Track listings ==
=== Digital single ===
No.	Title	Writer(s)	Length
1.	"Set Fire to the Hive"	I. Kenny, M. Hosking, A. Goddard, J. Stockman, S. Judd	4:29

=== EP ===
No.	Title	Length
1.	"Set Fire to the Hive"	4:26
2.	"Themata"	5:46
3.	"Roquefort" (with Empire Horns)	4:48
4.	"Deadman" (Live at The Forum)	10:37
Total length:		25:37
