= All at Once (2014 film) =

- Directed by: Roman Karimov
- Written by: Roman Karimov
- Produced by: Ilya Buretz; Dmitry Nelidov
- Starring: Nikita Ost; Anton Shurtsov; Aleksandr Pal
- Cinematography: Alexander Tananov
- Music by: Stanislav Alexandrov
- Production company: Central Partnership
- Release date: 5 June 2014
- Running time: 93 min
- Country: Russia
- Language: Russian

All at Once (Russian: Всё и сразу, romanized: Vsyo i srazu) is a 2014 Russian black comedy film directed by Roman Karimov.

== Plot ==
Tim and Dan are loser friends from a provincial town. University life is behind them, they do not wish to work, there are no girls. The guys undertake to fulfill the task of a local bandit and start to work, taking with them a car mechanic Zhora, who is also a total failure. It is necessary for them to clearly stage a robbery of their own, fake drug courier. The role of the courier is accidentally given to the honest demobbed Vanya, son of the local authority – the "Persian", who obeys the local criminal authority, who is not aware of the permutations and promises.

== Cast ==
- Nikita Ost as Vanya
- Anton Shurtsov as Tima
- Aleksandr Pal as Den
- Yulia Khlynina as Motya
- Artyom Kostyunev as Zhora
- Ilya Naishuller as The Armourer
- Sergei Pakhomov as Tima's Uncle

== Awards and nominations ==
- Russian National Movie Awards — Best Russian Action of the Year (nom)
