= All I Know (Karnivool song) =

Single by Karnivool

from the album Sound Awake
- Released: 9 November 2010
- Length: 4:53
- Label: Cymatic/Sony Music
- Songwriter(s): I. Kenny, M. Hosking, A. Goddard, J. Stockman, S. Judd
- Producer(s): Forrester Savell

Karnivool singles chronology
"Set Fire to the Hive" (2009)	"All I Know" (2010)	"We Are" (2013)

Music video
- "All I Know" on YouTube

"All I Know" is a song by Australian rock band Karnivool. It is the second single released from the band's second studio album, Sound Awake.

== Background ==
"All I Know" was not the first name the song was under. In fact, it had several. When the song was first made, it was under the name "Rape". The band became dissatisfied with this, and changed the name to "Pear", which is an anagram of "Rape". Again the band did not like this, so they lengthened the name to "Pearogram". This is the name it was under when it was first previewed, along with other songs from the album, at live shows. Then, before the album's release, the name was changed one last time, to "All I Know".

== Music video ==
On 9 November 2009, a video was posted on YouTube for the single. In the video, the band members appear to be lost in a giant maze with snowflakes drifting down from the sky. All members are playing their separate instruments, while Ian Kenny is singing and wandering around in the maze. Once the song goes into the chorus, all the members except Ian appear together (whereas before they were wondering apart) and start jamming, while a black substance shoots up into the sky around them. All this is mixed with footage of water rushing down a section of the maze. This is how the video continues until the end, which shows Ian kneeling in front of what looks like a giant mirror. A transparent hand reaches out of the mirror, and just when Ian's hand is about to touch the other hand the song ends and the video fades out.

== Personnel ==
- Ian Kenny - vocals
- Drew Goddard - lead guitar
- Mark Hosking - rhythm guitar
- Jon Stockman - bass
- Steve Judd - drums
- Forrester Savell - production
