= The Rehearsals =

- Film poster
- Russian: Репетиции
- Directed by: Oksana Karas
- Written by: Oksana Karas; Keren Klimovsky
- Produced by: Nikolay Chilingarov; Yuriy Khrapov; Vasiliy Solovev
- Starring: Nikita Efremov; Aleksandra Vinogradova; Igor Yatsko; Yana Gladkikh; Irina Denisova
- Cinematography: Artyom Chernov
- Music by: Marina Sobyanina
- Production company: 2D films
- Release date: June 2013 (Moscow)
- Running time: 90 min.
- Country: Russia
- Language: Russian

The Rehearsals (Russian: Репетиции, romanized: Repetitsii) is a 2013 Russian drama film directed by Oksana Karas.

== Plot ==
The film tells about the theater artist Alexander and the successful actor Igor, who live together, but constantly postpone later resolving issues related to family life. Alexandra got tired of it and she started a new romance.

== Cast ==
- Nikita Efremov as Igor Gradsky
- Aleksandra Vinogradova as Aleksandra Sukhanova
- Igor Yatsko as director Dmitri Nikolayevich
- Yana Gladkikh as Sasha
- Irina Denisova as Inga
- Pyotr Fyodorov as actor Fedya Petrov
- Aleksandr Yatsenko as neighbour
- Sakhat Dursunov as doctor Ruben Mikhaylovich
- Tatyana Orlova as nurse
- Ramilya Iskander as Ramilya
