= Have Fun, Vasya! =

- Film poster
- Directed by: Roman Karimov
- Written by: Roman Karimov; Yana Lebedeva
- Produced by: Andrey Novikov; Aleksandr Kotelevskiy; Eduard Iloyan; Denis Zhalinskiy; Vitaly Shlyappo; Aleksey Trotsyuk; Roman Karimov; Ruslan Tatarintsev
- Starring: Efim Petrunin; Lyubov Aksyonova; Boris Dergachev; Sofya Raizman; Roman Kurtsyn
- Cinematography: Aleksandr Tananov
- Edited by: Olga Alekseyeva; Yana Lebedeva; Tim Pavelko
- Music by: Konstantin Chalykh; Roman Karimov
- Production companies: STS; Yellow, Black and White; Filmi Navsegda; Invada Film
- Distributed by: Central Partnership
- Release date: 14 February 2017
- Running time: 96 minutes
- Country: Russia
- Language: Russian
- Budget: ₽40 million
- Box office: $4 million

Have Fun, Vasya! (Russian: Гуляй, Вася!, romanized: Guläj, Vasä!) is a 2017 Russian comedy film directed by Roman Karimov. The main roles were performed by Efim Petrunin as Mitya and Lyubov Aksyonova as Vasya.

== Plot ==
Mitya (Efim Petrunin) accidentally proposes to Alisa (Svetlana Stepankovskaya), and the girl's father immediately sets the date for their wedding. The situation is complicated by the fact that Mitya still has not divorced from his ex – Vasya (Lyubov Aksyonova), and naturally he does not want to tell his bride and her father about this. Vasya is ready to agree to a divorce only after her still lawful husband fulfills a number of conditions; one of them is that he must present her to his bride.

Mitya finds a girl, Nastya (Sofya Rayzman), who agrees to appear before Vasya as the bride. Nastya's boyfriend Maks (Roman Kurtsyn), after learning about this gets furious at first, but then agrees to also take part in this affair in return for a considerable fee from Mitya. Then the events unfold in such a way that Mitya and Nastya fall in love with each other.

== Cast ==
- Efim Petrunin as Dmitriy 'Mitya'
- Lyubov Aksyonova as Vasilisa 'Vasya', Mitya's wife, from whom he demands a divorce
- Boris Dergachev as Pasha, Mitya's friend
- Sofya Rayzman as Nastya, a waitress
- Roman Kurtsyn as Maks, Nastya's husband, former boxer
- Svetlana Stepankovskaya as Alisa, the girl to whom Mitya has proposed
- Sergey Abroskin as Garik, Mitya's friend
- Vera Panfilova as Kira, Pasha's wife
- Anna Tsukanova-Kott as Nonna, Kira's friend
- Stanislav Tlyashev as Renat, taxi driver
- Olga Lebedeva as Alisa's mom
- Mikhail Khmurov as Alisa's dad
- Sofia Lebedeva as actress of the avant-garde theater
- Alexander Golubkov as Smirnov, paratrooper
- Maxim Derichev as Vladislav, security guard of the club
- Ekaterina Kabak as Helen, the girl in the club
- Nikita Savinkin as Vanya

== Reception ==
The film received generally positive response from critics. In 2021, a sequel titled Have Fun, Vasya! Date in Bali (ru) was released.

== Release ==
The film premiered on February 14, 2017 in theaters. The television premiere of the comedy is on August 29, 2017 on the STS (TV channel).
