= Nikita Yefremov =

Russian actor (born 1988)

- Никита Ефремов
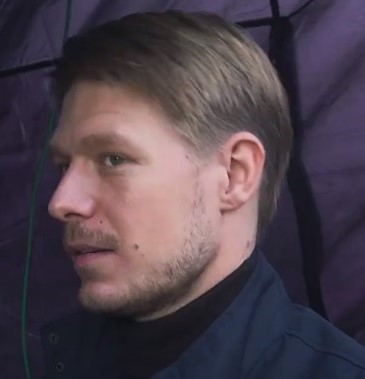
- Yefremov in 2019
- Born: Nikita Mikhailovich Yefremov; 30 May 1988 (age 38); Moscow, Russian SFSR, Soviet Union
- Education: Sovremennik Theatre
- Occupation: Actor
- Years active: 2004–present
- Spouse: Yana Gladkikh (m. 2014; div. 2015)
- Awards: 21st Golden Eagle Awards (2023)

Nikita Mikhailovich Yefremov (Russian: Никита Михайлович Ефремов; born 30 May 1988) is a Russian theatre actor, voice acting and dubbing actor, known for his roles in television series Londongrad (2015), The Thaw (2013) and in the film Cinderella (2012). He is a son of Mikhail Yefremov and a grandson of Oleg Yefremov.

== Biography ==
=== Early life and career ===
Nikita Yefremov was born in Moscow, Russian SFSR, Soviet Union. Nikita studied at the Physics and Mathematics Gymnasium, Gymnasium No. 1514 – Moscow Secondary School No. 52, and initially did not plan on becoming an actor, although he always participated in school plays. He graduated from the music school in violin, studied singing and also played the piano.

In 2005, he entered the Moscow Art Theater School, where he studied at Konstantin Raikin's course. During his studies he proved himself on the student stage and became the winner of the theater prize "Golden leaf 2009" in the nomination "Best male role" for the role of Chatsky in his theatrical performance Woe from Wit, directed by Viktor Ryzhakov. All the roles in the play were performed by the graduates of the acting course of Konstantin Raikin.

In 2009, Nikita Yefremov, a graduate of the Moscow Art Theatre School-Studio, was invited to several leading Moscow theaters. Of all the proposals, Nikita chose the Sovremennik Theatre, which was founded by his grandfather. His debut in this theater was the role of Gottfried Lenz in the play Three Comrades (the actor was introduced to the play on 1 October 2009, the day of the double anniversary of the performance (exactly 10 years ago the premiere took place and on this day the actors performed the play for the three hundredth time).

In 2023, he played the role of Tetris creator Alexey Pajitnov in the Tetris film released by Apple TV+.

== Filmography ==
Year	Title	Role	Notes
2009	Passenger	Baklanov	
2011	Ivan Tsarevich and the Gray Wolf	Ivan Tsarevich	Voice
2012	Love with Accent	Andrei	
2012	Cinderella	Pasha	
2013	Everything Began in Harbin	Georgiy Desnin	
2013	Ivan Tsarevich and the Gray Wolf 2	Ivan Tsarevich	Voice
2013	The Rehearsals	Igor	
2013	The Thaw	Oleg Yefremov	
2014	Kuprin. Duel	Georgiy Alekseyevich Romashov, second lieutenant	TV series
2015	Quiet Flows the Don	Dmitriy Korshunov	
2015	Londongrad	Misha Kulikov	TV series
2016	Ivan Tsarevich and the Gray Wolf 3	Ivan Tsarevich	Voice
2019	Ivan Tsarevich and the Gray Wolf 4	Ivan Tsarevich	Voice
2021	Hostel	Vanya Simakov	
2022	Ivan Tsarevich and the Gray Wolf 5	Ivan Tsarevich	Voice
2022	Intensive Care	Yegor Tikhonov	
2023	Tetris	Alexey Pajitnov	
2023	The Librarian	Aleksei Vyazintsev	TV series
