= Themata (song) =

Single by Karnivool

from the album Themata
- Released: 11 July 2005
- Length: 5:40
- Label: MGM Distribution
- Songwriter(s): Karnivool

Karnivool singles chronology
"Roquefort" (2005)	"Themata" (2005)	"Set Fire to the Hive" (2009)

"Themata" is a song by Australian rock band Karnivool. It was released in July 2005 as the third and final single from their debut album Themata, following the singles, "L1FEL1KE" and "Roquefort".

"Themata" is the first song by Karnivool to chart on Triple J's Hottest 100, where it reached #97 in 2005.

The song was covered by Australian Idol contestant Reigan Derry in 2006.

== Music video ==
The music video for the song was released with the song on 11 June 2005. It was Karnivool's second music video, after "L1FEL1KE" in 2003.

The music video features the band playing in a room with red curtains, with the band's trademark, a little bug with what appear to be glass eyes, flying around. Some lyrics of the song flash up on screen and disappear again. The video is about a minute shorter than the album track.

== Track listing ==
Single

No.	Title	Length
1.	"Themata"	5:47
2.	"Sleeping Satellite" (Tasmin Archer cover; vocals by Mark Hosking)	4:03

EP

No.	Title	Length
1.	"Themata" (radio edit)	4:43
2.	"Themata" (album version)	5:47
3.	"Sleeping Satellite" (Tasmin Archer cover; vocals by Mark Hosking)	4:03
4.	"Shutterspeed"	6:34

== Personnel ==
Karnivool

- Ian Kenny – lead vocals
- Drew Goddard – guitar, drums, backing vocals, string arrangements
- Mark Hosking – guitar, backing vocals, lead vocals on "Sleeping Satellite"
- Jon Stockman – bass

Additional

- Novac Bull – additional vocals
- Leigh Miller – string arrangements

String section

- Elise Turner
- Eve Silver
- Georgina Cameron
- Lathika Vithanage
