= All-Russian Research Institute of Television and Radio Broadcasting =

Research institute in Russia

- Established: 1945
- Location: Moscow, Russia
- Coordinates: 55.7874°N 37.4994°E

The All-Russian Research Institute of Television and Radio Broadcasting (VNIITR; Russian: Всероссийский научно-исследовательский институт телевидения и радиовещания (ВНИИТР) is an institute specializing in television broadcasting, magnetic video and sound recording, gramophone recording, radio broadcasting and radio broadcasting acoustics.

== History ==
The institute traces its history 1934. At that time, the Central Research Laboratory of Gramplasttrest (Russian: Грампласттрест) was created in the USSR. The laboratory was engaged in mechanical sound recording. Thanks to this work, it became possible to restore old mechanical records.

During the Great Patriotic War, the laboratory was engaged in the development of army sound broadcasting stations. These stations were engaged in propaganda of enemy troops. Since 1945, the All-Union Research Institute of Sound Recording (Russian: Всесоюзный научно-исследовательский институт телевидения и радиовещания) (VNAIZ) has grown out of the laboratory. In 1963, this institute was renamed the All-Russian Research Institute of Magnetic Recording and Technology of Radio and Television Broadcasting (VNIIRT), and in 1970 it was renamed the All-Russian Research Institute of Television and Radio Broadcasting (VNIITR). From 1979 to 1987 the general director was Sergey Ivanovich Nikanorov.

In 1996, the enterprise became an open joint-stock company.

== Activity ==
Since its establishment, the Institute of Television and Radio Broadcasting has been engaged in work in the field of magnetic sound recording, the use of recording to create broadcasts in radio broadcasting, television, and cinematography.

In the 1950s, the institute developed studio and report tape recorders, and in the 1960s and 1970s, the Kadr-1 and Kadr-3 video recorders. In 1980, the institute participated in television broadcasts from the 1980 Summer Olympics in Moscow.

In 1982–1984, the institute developed second-generation video recorders "Kadr-103SC", used for television broadcasting, in 1987 - devices for determining the parameters of magnetic tapes.

In the 1990s, the institute worked on issues of creating high-definition television, then on the development of television and radio broadcasting equipment: transcoders, switches, optical-mechanical devices for television cameras, etc.

Since 1994, VNIITR has been engaged in certification in the GOST R system.
