= Roman Karimov =

Russian composer

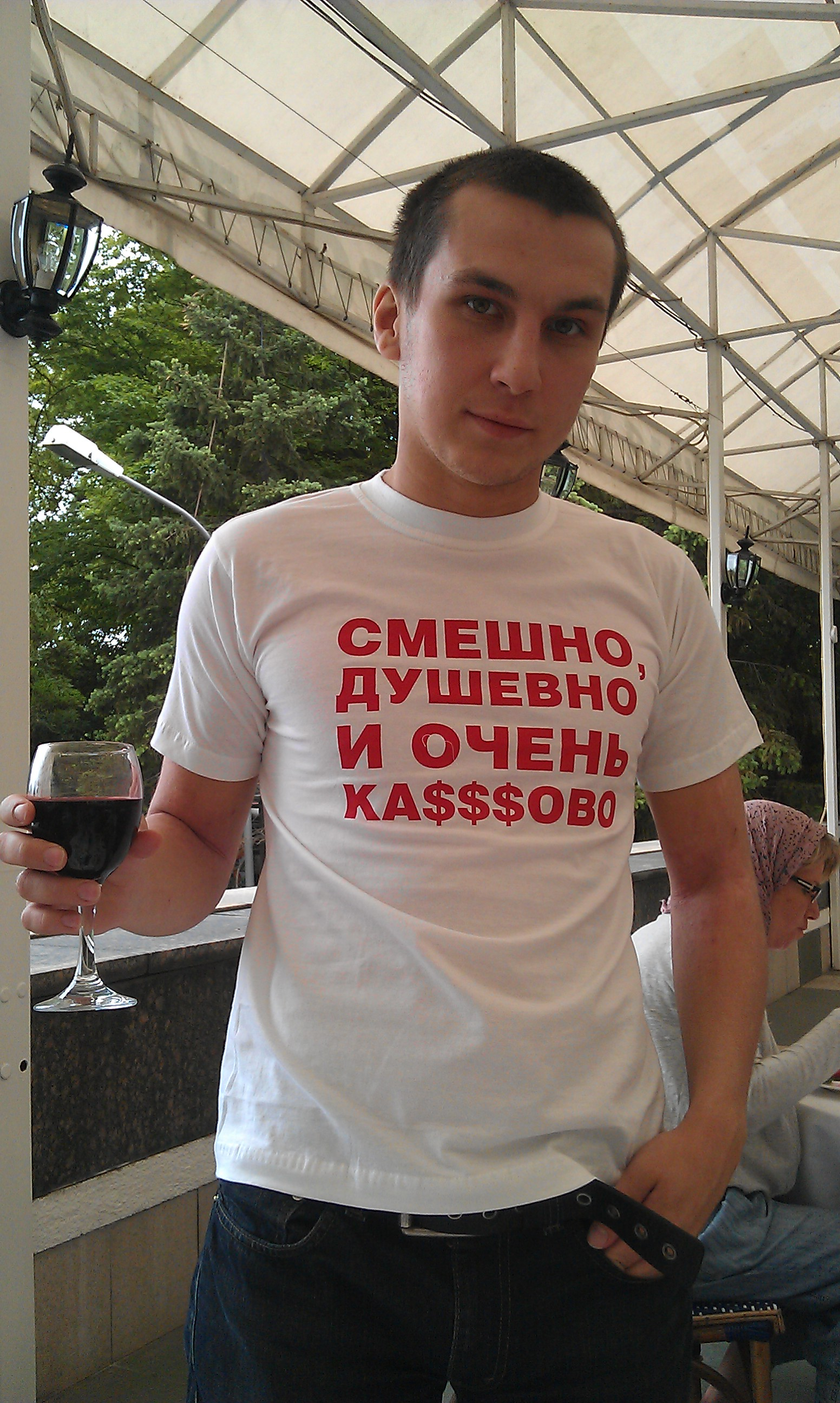
- Born: Roman Leonidovich Karimov; June 20, 1984 (age 40); Ufa, Soviet Union (now Russia)
- Citizenship: Russian Federation
- Occupation(s): film director, screenwriter, composer

Roman Leonidovich Karimov (Russian: Роман Леонидович Каримов, born June 20, 1984) is a Russian film director, screenwriter, composer, film editor and producer.

Year	Film	Director	Writer	Composer	Editor	Producer	Notes
2010	Inadequate People	Yes	Yes	Yes	Yes		
2011	Smithereens	Yes					
2013	All at Once	Yes	Yes		Yes		
2014	Startap	Yes					
2017	Have Fun, Vasya!	Yes	Yes	Yes		Yes	
2017	Black Water	Yes	Yes	Yes			
2020	Inadequate People 2	Yes	Yes			Yes	
2023	Dykhaniye	Yes	Yes				
