= Inadequate People =

- Film poster
- Directed by: Roman Karimov
- Written by: Roman Karimov
- Produced by: Mikhail Kukushkin; Andrey Tarasov; Anton Toroptsev
- Starring: Ilya Lyubimov; Ingrid Olerinskaya
- Cinematography: Ilya Ovsenev
- Edited by: Roman Karimov
- Music by: Roman Karimov
- Production companies: Paradise; Cinema Prime Film
- Release dates: August 2010 (Window to Europe); 13 January 2011
- Running time: 102 min.
- Country: Russia
- Language: Russian

Inadequate People (Russian: Неадекватные люди, romanized: Neadekvatnye lyudi) is a 2010 Russian romantic comedy-drama film directed by Roman Karimov, starring Ilya Lyubimov and Ingrid Olerinskaya.

== Plot ==
Thirty year-old man Vitaly tries to get away from worrying problems and mental discomfort by leaving the provincial town of Serpukhov and moving to Moscow, hoping to find internal harmony.

== Cast ==
- Ilya Lyubimov as Vitaly
- Ingrid Olerinskaya as Kristina
- Yevgeny Tsyganov as Psychologist

== Awards ==
- Window to Europe (2010)
  - Grand Prix Film Festival
  - Diploma of Russian Guild of Film Critics
  - Diploma - for the actor's duet (Ingrid Olerinskaya and Ilya Lyubimov)
  - Golden Boat Prize
  - Prize for the best screenplay from the Union of Journalists
