= Subtruck =

Australian musical group

Background information
- Origin: Perth, Western Australia, Australia
- Genres: Rock
- Years active: 1998–2007
- Label: Sic Squared Records
- Past members: Phil Bradley; Kris Goodwin; Robert Troup

Subtruck were an Australian heavy groove rock band that was formed in 1998 in Perth, Western Australia by singer and guitarist Phil Bradley, previously of The Jackals. The band split up in 2007.

== History ==
Subtruck released their debut eponymous EP in 2000 before signing to Sic Squared Records in 2001. Their first album for Sic Squared Records, Songs to Whistle at War, was released in 2002, and lead to their inclusion on several compilations including 'Left of Centre 2', 'S.L.A.M. 2002' and 'Foot in the Door'.

2003 saw them support iconic Australian alternative acts The Mark of Cain and the Lime Spiders on the West Australian legs of their respective national tours.

The band released their second album Ballbaring in 2004 to much acclaim, including a spot in Triple J's 'Full Metal Racket' DJ Andrew Haug's Top 5 Releases for 2004, and a nomination for 'Best Heavy Rock Act' at the 2004 WAMi Awards. The band toured nationally twice in 2005 and was again nominated for 'Best Heavy Rock Act' at that year's WAMi Awards.

The band's last album Pig Iron was released on 25 March 2006, with the band releasing a limited home edition DVD Get Trucked in December 2006.

After the band split in 2007, Phil Bradley, bassist Rob Troup and Phil’s son Jake Bradley formed the band BRUTUS in 2008.

== Members ==
- Phil Bradley – Vocals, guitar
- Kris Goodwin – Drums
- Robert Troup – Bass

== Discography ==
- Subtruck (EP) – 2000
- Songs to Whistle at War – Sic Squared (2001)
- Ballbaring – Sic Squared (2004)
- Pig Iron – Sic Squared (2006)
