= Dmitry Pavlenko =

Russian handball player

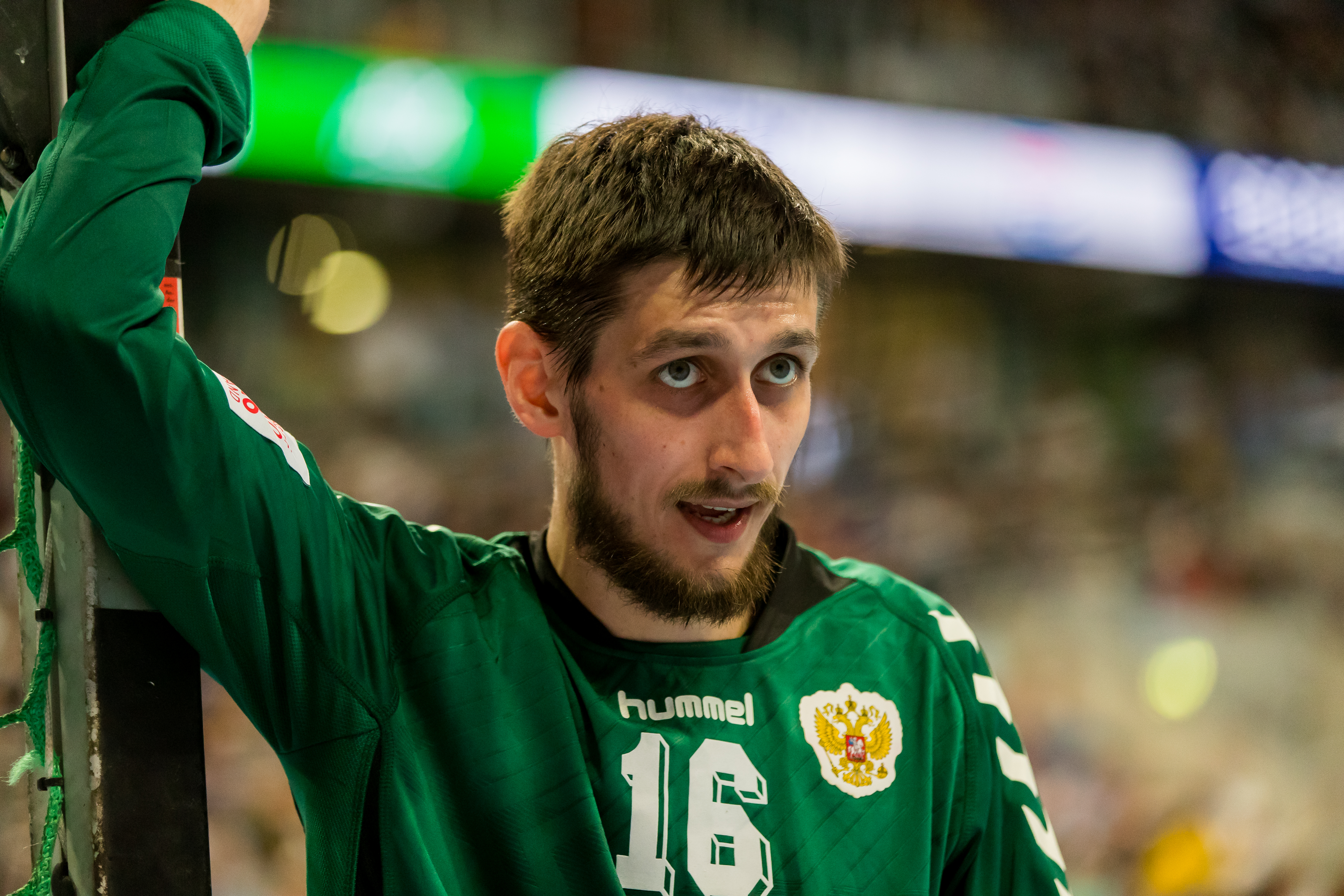
- Pavlenko in 2016

Personal information
- Nationality: Russian
- Born: 1 January 1991 (age 35) Zagorje ob Savi, Slovenia
- Height: 1.93 m (6 ft 4 in)

Sport
- Sport: Handball
- Position: Goalkeeper
- Current club: Chekhovskiye Medvedi
- Number: 12
National team
Years	Team	Apps	(Gls)
–	Russia	31	(0)

Dmitry Vladimirovich Pavlenko (Russian: Дмитрий Владимирович Павленко; born 1 January 1991) is a Russian handball player for Chekhovskiye Medvedi and the Russian national team.

He competed at the 2016 European Men's Handball Championship.
