= Karnivool =

Australian rock band

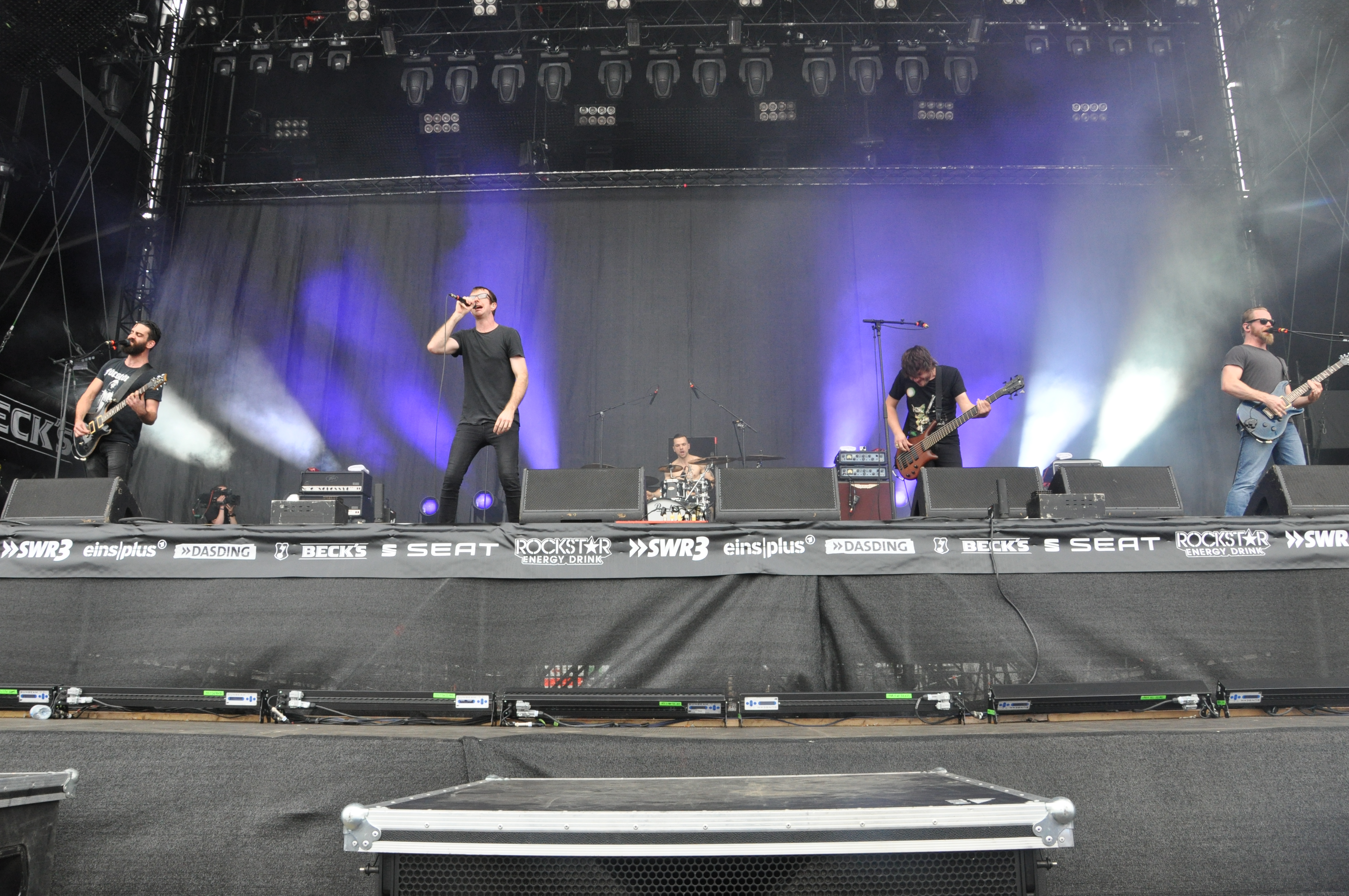
- Karnivool performing in 2014

Background information
- Origin: Perth, Western Australia, Australia
- Genres: Alternative metal; progressive rock; alternative rock; progressive metal
- Years active: 1998–present
- Labels: Sic Squared; Bieler Bros.; Cymatic; Density
- Spinoffs: Birds of Tokyo; Floating Me
- Members: Ian Kenny; Drew Goddard; Jon Stockman; Mark Hosking; Steve Judd
- Past members: Andrew Browne; Brett McKenzie; Ray Hawking
- Website: karnivool.com.au

Karnivool is an Australian rock band formed in Perth in 1998. Since 2004, the group has consisted of Ian Kenny on vocals, Drew Goddard and Mark Hosking on guitar, Jon Stockman on bass, and Steve Judd on drums. The band has released four studio albums to date: Themata (2005), Sound Awake (2009), Asymmetry (2013) and In Verses (2026).

== History ==
=== 1997–2003: Early years ===
Karnivool developed from a high school band formed in 1997 in Perth, Western Australia, which played parties using a set of cover versions of Nirvana and Carcass songs, with some original compositions also included. In 1998, lead singer Ian Kenny changed their set to entirely original songs, removed all of the early band members and officially named the band Karnivool, derived from a local anecdotal description that the original members were "a bunch of clowns".

Between 1998 and 2004, the band underwent a number of line-up changes. The original incarnation of Karnivool consisted of Kenny on lead vocals, Andrew 'Drew' Goddard on lead guitar, Andrew Brown on bass and Brett McKenzie on drums. In 2000, Brown was replaced by Jon Stockman and, shortly after, McKenzie also left and Ray Hawking joined on drums. Mark Hosking joined as rhythm guitarist in 2003 and in late 2004 Steve Judd replaced Hawking. The band's line-up remained unchanged thereafter.

In 1999 the band released its debut self-titled EP Karnivool. This consisted of four tracks: "Fool Me", "Konkrete Seed", "Box" and "Some More of the Same". This EP did not receive a significant amount of recognition, with many stores and archives listing their second EP Persona, released in March 2001, as their first record. Persona consists of four new tracks and a re-release of the song "Some More of the Same" from the first EP.

After releasing Persona, the band won the Western Australian State Final of the National Campus Band Competition and competed in the National Finals held in Hobart, Tasmania. In October 2001, the band were chosen to support the Rollins Band but, due to the Ansett collapse, Henry Rollins and his band were forced to cancel their Perth show. At the end of 2001, the band played a support set for Fear Factory.

=== 2004–2007: Themata ===
Goddard wrote the tracks for Karnivool's first album Themata and he stated that they played songs from Themata together as a band only after it was recorded. Produced by Forrester Savell, Goddard not only wrote all of the album's songs and played guitar, but also played drums on every track except "L1fel1ke", as Judd had not yet joined the band. Themata was released independently on 7 February 2005, and was distributed via MGM Distribution. On 23 August 2006, Karnivool signed a licensing deal with Bieler Bros. Records, a US indie label. The album was issued in the US on 10 April 2007 and in the UK on 7 May. The band also re-released the Persona EP on 12 December 2007, following the success of Themata.

Karnivool completed the 'Homeland Security Tour' shortly after the release of Themata. In late 2007, they played with the 'Great American Rampage Tour' in North America. During this time frame, Karnivool also contributed a cover of Gotye's song "The Only Way" to the album Mixed Blood, which contains covers and remixes of songs from Gotye's Boardface and Like Drawing Blood albums. It does not feature on any Karnivool albums. Goddard and Stockman also played guitar and bass respectively on the title track of the 2005 album Hold Your Colour, by Perth group Pendulum.

=== 2008–2010: Sound Awake ===
After touring in the US, Karnivool returned to Australia in 2008 and subsequently entered the studio to write their follow-up to Themata. Goddard stated that the new album Sound Awake would be a huge progression from Themata, while Stockman stated that the writing process of the new record was a collaborative effort by the band, in contrast to their previous work. Karnivool disclosed their new recording strategy for the second album: try to focus less on minute details and record a more natural-sounding album. The album was again produced and mixed by Savell.

In an interview with Rock photographer and writer Stephen Lane, guitarist Mark Hosking said the band had mixed the album at Sing Sing Studios in Melbourne, however, had recorded the tracking at locations all over Perth. This was done to save money, but also out of convenience due to other projects each band member had going at the time. The interview also revealed that the band had recorded drums first, then guitars, then bass, then synths, layers and so on. This was a diversion from the usual Drums, Bass, Guitar method in the past.

The band continued to tour Australia, including the Big Day Out tour, Pyramid Rock Festival, Southbound and Homebake. During their live performances for the Aeons Tour, they played some of the new songs from the album, such as "Goliath", "Deadman", "Pearogram" (All I Know) and "New Day". At Homebake in 2008 they debuted a fifth new song entitled "Set Fire to the Hive", which was confirmed as the first single from the album. The new songs were considered more mature, while still bearing resemblance to the band's previous work.

On 26 April 2009, the video for "Set Fire to the Hive" was released and on 9 May peaked at No. 11 on the AIR Top 20 singles charts. The album was released on 5 June 2009 and debuted at No. 2 on the ARIA Album Charts. and No. 1 on the AIR Charts. In October 2009, the album received Gold certification for sales in Australia.

The band toured Australia in support of Sound Awake, followed by shows in New Zealand skipping regional towns, and they took Perth band Sugar Army with them as support, and then the US to headline 'Third Eye Gathering' in Los Angeles. The band then toured the UK in September and October 2009. On 9 November 2009, Karnivool published a music video on YouTube for their second single "All I Know".

Sound Awake was released by Sony Music Independent Network/RED in the US and Canada on 16 February 2010. Karnivool followed the release with a co-headlining US tour with Fair to Midland.

After a successful tour of Europe and the US, Karnivool returned to Australia and announced the national 'New Day Tour'. Two Melbourne shows and a Sydney show quickly sold out, unprecedented in Karnivool's history, and further shows in Sydney, Melbourne, Brisbane and Perth were consequently announced. The band then temporarily ceased touring so that Kenny could tour with his other band Birds of Tokyo; however, touring resumed by December 2010.

On the back of Internet-based popularity, the band played its first ever show in India in 2010. The performance in Mumbai attracted 10,000 people and, as of July 2013, is the band's biggest show, with "fireworks and confetti cannons going off, and big movie screens on either side of the stage in this big amphitheatre and people singing along." Goddard explained the Indian experience, a result of file sharing and word-of-mouth, in a July 2013 interview:

That was incredible. We've played a lot of Western countries but to go to a place like India, you know, all we thought we had in common was cricket but I was very wrong. That was our first show there. We didn't even have a release or anything. We didn't even realise we had a following there, then we announced the show and all these messages started coming back through social media ... Having a beer in the hotel room afterwards, we were like "What the hell? Did that actually happen?"

=== 2011–2018: Asymmetry ===
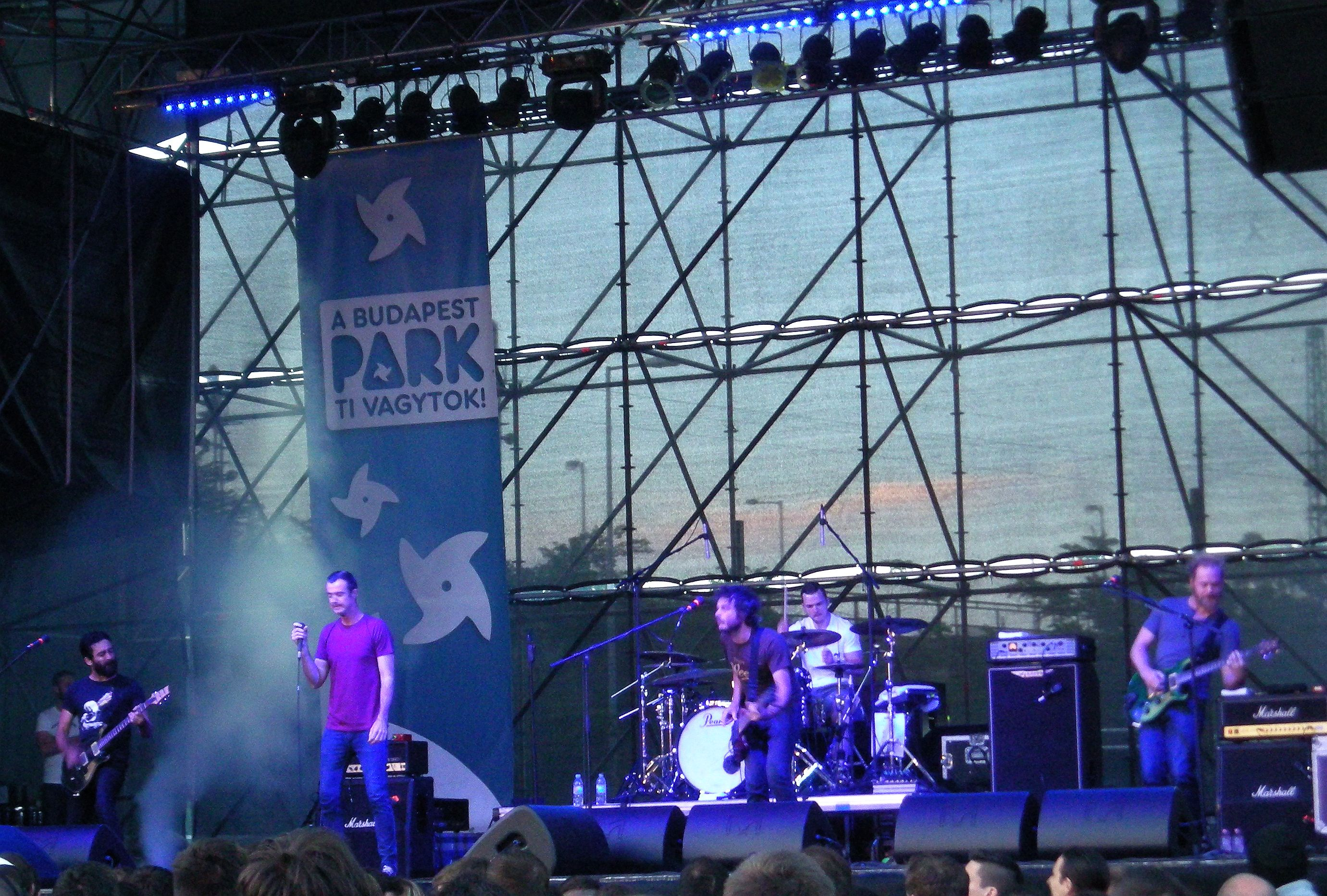
Karnivool performing in Budapest (2013)

Sometime after returning to Australia in September, the band planned to begin writing material for a third album. Hosking reiterated this, stating the band plans on demoing songs for the third album at this time, and described the material as, "...a departure from Sound Awake whilst still holding all the principles that make for a Karnivool album."

In March 2011, Karnivool announced three shows in their native Western Australia, commenting: "These shows will be the last of the Sound Awake era, as well as a possible pointer of things to come." At these shows they debuted a new song "The Refusal" and Goddard stated that the band was working in the studio on their third album. The tour continued throughout the rest of Australia, and later in the year the band toured India for the IIT Bombay cultural festival Mood Indigo in December 2011.

On 21 March 2012, the "Melodias Frescas" Australian tour was announced and the band confirmed that new material would be played during the tour. The band played 16 sold-out theatre shows around Australia, with support from Melbourne's Redcoats and Sydney instrumental group sleepmakeswaves.

The band returned to India in November 2012 for some additional shows and, during the same period, announced that they were recording their third album at 301 studios in Byron Bay, Australia. The band toured Australia again in December 2012, performing shows in Wollongong and Sydney before the Pyramid Festival for New Year's Eve.

In April 2013, the band announced that they had entered the mixing phase of the third album with producer Nick Didia, while on 16 May 2013, the band's management Fidelity Corporation stated: "Spending the night watching the new Karnivool doco and listening to the new Karnivool album."

On 19 May 2013, the studio version of "The Refusal" was premiered on Australian radio station Triple J—the song became available as a free download on the radio station's website the following day and members of the band's mailing list received the download later in the week. The band's first Australian show for the year was at Western Australia's "State of the Art" festival on 2 June 2013 at the Perth Concert Hall, and the festival's promotional material stated that a "global premiere" of the band's new single would occur at the event.

A music video directed by Chris Frey was filmed in April 2013, but the name of the song was not disclosed at the time that the production information was made available. On 14 June 2013, the Frey-directed music video was released and the song is called "We Are". The band also revealed the title, track list and cover art for their third album, entitled Asymmetry. Triple J aired the radio debut of the six-minute-long "We Are" on the "Doctor" programme and Kenny explained to one of the station's announcers: "Asymmetry really harks to what we try to do musically as a band. Light and dark. Exploration. Sometimes we go too far and we get lost, so we backtrack a bit and find exactly what we're looking for."

Speaking with Simon Collins of The West Australian newspaper, Goddard explained that the recording process is difficult for the band and despite efforts to try and shorten the duration between albums, the band has managed to release three albums in fifteen years:

It's something we grapple with all the time. We try to speed it up and make the frequency of album releases a lot faster. We're completely mystified by the songwriting process, and that's the bottom line for us - we don't know what we're doing. We don't. It feels like it's out of our control a lot of the time.

Asymmetry was released on 19 July 2013 and a deal was secured with Density Records for the US region. The album debuted in the number 1 position of the Australian ARIA chart.

Following the receipt of an ARIA award for Asymmetry (the first time the band has won an ARIA award), Goddard stated in a January 2014 interview that "it's [the ARIA award] just one of those things where it's almost like it validates us in other people's eyes." Goddard further explained that the album was created as a reaction to his perception of a current musical trend, whereby "even heavy progressive music to me is losing a lot of the human characteristics, gridlocking everything and cutting out all the air between the guitar, the strums, and all that". Goddard announced that the band would undertake a national Australian tour with Dead Letter Circus and sleepmakeswaves during January 2014. He and Mark Hosking appear in the 2014 documentary film Metal Down Under.

In January 2015, Karnivool played three festivals in India. Following that, the band embarked on their biggest ever headline tour of the UK and Europe in March/April 2015, with support from English act Monuments. In March 2015, the band announced the 'Themata Decade tour' celebrating 10 years since the release of their debut album, with 16 shows around Australia in April and May. Cairo Knife Fight was announced as the opening act.

=== 2019–present: In Verses ===
In May 2019, Karnivool revealed that they had been in the process of recording their fourth album. In February 2020, they announced an April tour for the 10th anniversary of Sound Awake, which was later postponed to March 2021 due to the COVID-19 pandemic. However, all tour dates outside of Western Australia were cancelled in February 2021, instead opting to livestream the remaining concerts.

On 10 December 2021, Karnivool released the single "All It Takes", produced by Forrester Savell. It is the band's first studio release since Asymmetry in 2013. In 2022, they headlined the Monolith Festival in Australia alongside Cog and were supported by acts such as Ocean Grove, Plini, Sleepmakeswaves, Reliqa and Yomi Ship.

In late June 2025 Karnivool released the stand-alone single "Drone", their first new music since 2021's "All It Takes". The track was produced by longtime collaborator Forrester Savell and described by the band as “the sound of Karnivool entering a new era — a slow-cooked journey forged in the studio’s heat, where every note was tested and tempered”. Issued ahead of the band’s Ad Complementum Australian tour, "Drone" was promoted as the first preview of their long-gestating fourth studio album. Said album, In Verses, was officially announced in September 2025. A music video for the song "Opal" was released on 17 December 2025 alongside the announcement that the album would be released on 6 February 2026.

== Musical style and influences ==
Influenced by Deftones and Tool, Karnivool originally formed as "a nu-metal inclined" project which was "melodically-inclined but blisteringly-technical" and categorized by "head-spinning time signatures and downtuned riff wizardry", before they reinvented themselves and expanded their sound. AllMusic said that Karnivool's sound combines "progressive rock, alternative rock, and metal influences". Metal Hammer said that Karnivool "pushed [Australian progressive metal] into the world's gaze. Their debut album, 2005’s Themata, clicked with a subculture that was barely post-nu metal, resurrecting [the progressive metal genre] for one last gasp with a Tool-inspired twist". Rolling Stone India classified Karnivool as a progressive rock band, defined by "odd-time signatures, buzzing riffs and jagged guitar lines, soaring and harmonized vocals [and] cerebral writing." AltSounds stated that Karnivool plays "semi progressive, alt-metal and have drawn comparisons with Tool due to this."

== Personnel ==
Current members

- Ian Kenny – lead vocals (1998–present)
- Drew Goddard – guitar, backing vocals (1998–present)
- Jon Stockman – bass, unclean vocals (2000–present)
- Mark Hosking – guitar, backing vocals (2003–present)
- Steve Judd – drums (2004–present)

Past members

- Andrew Brown – bass (1998–2000)
- Brett McKenzie – drums (1998–2000)
- Ray Hawking – drums (2000–2004)

Timeline

== Discography ==
=== Albums ===
Title	Details	Peak chart positions					Certification
Title	Details	AUS	FIN	GER	NZ	SWI	Certification
Themata	Released: 7 February 2005; Label: Bieler Bros./MGM (KARN001); Format: CD	41	—	—	—	—	ARIA: Platinum
Sound Awake	Released: 5 June 2009; Label: Cymatic/Sony (KARN004); Format: CD, DD	2	—	—	—	—	ARIA: Gold
Asymmetry	Released: 19 July 2013; Label: Density/Cymatic/Sony (KARN006); Format: CD, DD, LP	1	37	44	32	45	ARIA: Gold
In Verses	Released: 6 February 2026; Label: Cymatic/Sony; Format: CD, DD, LP	1	—	17	36	21	

=== EPs ===
Title	Details
Karnivool	Released: 1999; Label: Karnivool; Format: CD
Persona	Released: March 2001; Label: Sic Squared (Sic003); Format: CD

=== Singles ===
Title	Year	Album
"Lifelike”	2002	Themata
"Roquefort"	2005	Themata
"Themata"	2005	Themata
"Set Fire to the Hive"	2009	Sound Awake
"All I Know"	2010	Sound Awake
"We Are"	2013	Asymmetry
"Eidolon"	2013	Asymmetry
"All It Takes"	2021	In Verses
"Drone"	2025	In Verses
"Aozora"	2025	In Verses
"Opal"	2025	In Verses
"Animation"	2026	In Verses

=== Music Videos ===
- "Lifelike" (2005)
- "Themata" (2005)
- "Shutterspeed" (2006)
- "Set Fire To The Hive" (2009)
- "All I Know" (2010)
- "We Are" (2013)
- "Eidolon" (2013)
- "Opal" (2026)

== Videography ==
=== Video albums ===
List of video albums
Title	Album details
Decade of Sound Awake	Released: 10 December 2021; Label: Cymatic/Sony; Format: Blu-ray

== Awards and nominations ==
AIR Award

The Australian Independent Record Awards (commonly known informally as AIR Awards) is an annual awards night to recognise, promote and celebrate the success of Australia's independent music sector.

Year	Nominee / work	Award	Result
2006	"Persona"	Best Performing Independent Single/EP	Nominated
2006	themselves	Most Outstanding New Independent Artist	Nominated

APRA Awards

The APRA Awards are presented annually from 1982 by the Australasian Performing Right Association (APRA), "honouring composers and songwriters". They commenced in 1982.

Year	Nominee / work	Award	Result	Ref.
2010	"All I Know" (Andrew Goddard / Mark Hosking /Stephen Judd / Ian Kenny / Jonathan Stockman)	Song of the Year	Shortlisted	
2010	"Set Fire to the Hive" (Andrew Goddard / Mark Hosking /Stephen Judd / Ian Kenny / Jonathan Stockman)	Song of the Year	Shortlisted	
2014	"We Are" (Andrew Goddard / Mark Hosking / Stephen Judd / Ian Kenny / Jonathan Stockman)	Song of the Year	Shortlisted	

ARIA Music Awards

The ARIA Music Awards is an annual awards ceremony that recognises excellence, innovation, and achievement across all genres of Australian music.

Year	Nominee / work	Award	Result
2009	Forrester Savell for Sound Awake	Producer of the Year	Nominated
2013	Asymmetry	Best Hard Rock/Heavy Metal Album	Won
2013	Asymmetry Tour	Best Australian Live Act	Nominated
2026	In Verses	Best Hard Rock/Heavy Metal Album	Won

Australian Music Prize

The Australian Music Prize (the AMP) is an annual award of $50,000 given to an Australian band or solo artist in recognition of the merit of an album released during the year of award. It commenced in 2005.

Year	Nominee / work	Award	Result	Ref.
2026	In Verses	Australian Music Prize	Nominated	

J Awards

The J Awards are an annual series of Australian music awards that were established by the Australian Broadcasting Corporation's youth-focused radio station Triple J. They commenced in 2005.

Year	Nominee / work	Award	Result
2009	Sound Awake	Australian Album of the Year	Nominated
2013	Asymmetry	Australian Album of the Year	Nominated

National Live Music Awards

The National Live Music Awards (NLMAs) are a broad recognition of Australia's diverse live industry, celebrating the success of the Australian live scene. The awards commenced in 2016.

Year	Nominee / work	Award	Result
2016	Steve Judd (Karnivool)	Live Drummer of the Year	Nominated

West Australian Music Industry Awards

The Western Australian Music Industry Awards (commonly known as WAMis) are annual awards presented to the local contemporary music industry, put on by the Western Australian Music Industry Association Inc (WAM). Karnivool have won seventeen awards.

Year	Nominee / work	Award	Result (wins only)
2001	Karnivool	Most Popular Original Metal Act	Won
2002	Karnivool	Most Popular Local Original Metal Act	Won
2003	Karnivool	Most Popular Local Original Live Act	Won
2003	Karnivool	Most Popular Local Original Heavy Rock Act	Won
2005	Karnivool	Best Hard Rock/Metal Act	Won
2006	Karnivool	Best Hard Rock/Metal Act	Won
2006	Drew Goddard (Karnivool)	Best Guitarist	Won
2007	Karnivool	Most Popular Act	Won
2007	Karnivool	Most Popular Live Act	Won
2007	Karnivool	Best Hard Rock Act	Won
2007	Ian Kenny (Karnivool)	Best Male Vocalist	Won
2007	Andrew Goddard (Karnivool)	Best Guitarist	Won
2008	Karnivool	Most Popular Live Act	Won
2008	Karnivool	Best Hard Rock/Metal Act	Won
2010	Karnivool	Most Popular Live Act	Won
2010	Sound Awake	Most Popular Album	Won
2013	Karnivool	Best Metal / Heavy Act	Won
