= List of Russian films of 2010 =

The following films were produced in Russia in 2010 (see 2010 in film).

== 2010 ==
Title	Russian title	Director	Genre	Notes
The Alien Girl	Чужая	Anton Bormatov	Action	
Black Hunters 2	Мы из будущего 2	Alexander Samokhvaov	War, history, science fiction	Sequel to Black Hunters
Burnt by the Sun 2	Утомлённые солнцем 2	Nikita Mikhalkov	War film	Russia's highest production budget to date.
Dark World	Тёмный мир	Anton Megerdischev	Horror	The first Russian 3D film.
The Devil's Flower	Цветок дьявола	Ekaterina Grokhovskaya	Romantic fantasy	Olga Khokhlova, Sergey Krapiventsev, Oleg Sukachenko
Europe-Asia	Европа-Азия			
The Edge	Край	Alexei Uchitel	Drama	The movie was nominated for the 68th Golden Globe Awards. The film was selected as the Russian entry for the Best Foreign Language Film at the 83rd Academy Awards but it didn't make the final shortlist.
Fog	Туман	Ivan Shurhovetsky		A German-Russian war film.
Fortress of War	Брестская крепость	Alexander Kott	War	
Guys from Mars	Парень с Марса	Sergey Osipyan	Comedy	
Happy end	Счастливый конец	Yaroslav Chevaevsky		
The House of the Sun	Дом Cолнца	Garik Sukachov	Drama	
How I Ended This Summer	Как я провёл этим летом	Alexei Popogrebski	Drama	The movie was nominated for the Golden Bear at the 60th Berlin International Film Festival
In the Style of Jazz	В стиле jazz	Stanislav Govorukhin	Comedy	
Iron Lord	Ярослав. Тысячу лет назад	Dmitry Korobkin	Historical	
Ivanov	Иванов	Vadim Dubrovitsky	Drama	
Love in the Big City 2	Любовь в большом городе 2	Maryus Vaysberg	Romantic comedy	
Kandagar	Кандагар	Andrei Kavun		
Kiss Through a Wall	Поцелуй сквозь стену	Vartan Akopyan	Comedy	
Orange Juice	Апельсиновый сок	Andrey Proshkin	Comedy	
Our Russia. The Balls of Fate	Наша Russia. Яйца судьбы	Gleb Orlov	Comedy	
Soundtrack of Passion	Фонограмма страсти	Nikolay Lebedev		
The Phobos	Фобос	Oleg Assadulin	Horror	Produced by Fyodor Bondarchuk
Returning to the 'A'	Возвращение в «А»	Egor Konchalovsky	Drama	
Silent Souls	Овсянки	Aleksey Fedorchenko	Drama	
Skipped Parts	Детям до 16	Andrey Kavun	Drama	
Solar Eclipse	Солнечное затмение	Sergei Komarov		Drama
A Stoker	Кочегар	Aleksey Balabanov	Crime	
Yolki	Ёлки	Timur Bekmambetov, Yaroslav Chevazhevskiy, Ignas Jonynas, Dmitriy Kiselev, Aleksandr Voytinskiy	Comedy, Drama	
True Story. Legendary Trio	Живая История. Легендарная Тройка	Yuri Zanin	Documentary	A film based on a real-life story about a Soviet legendary hockey trio and the matches that made history.
To Live	Жить	Yuri Bykov	Drama	
Two	Двое	Anatoly Mateshko		A German-Russian World War II film.
What Men Talk About	О чём говорят мужчины	Dmitry Dyashchenko	Comedy	

== See also ==
- 2010 in Russia
