= The Dawns Here Are Quiet =

The Dawns Here Are Quiet may refer to:

- The Dawns Here Are Quiet (novel), a 1969 novel by Boris Vasilyev
- The Dawns Here Are Quiet (1972 film), a Soviet war drama film, based on the novel
- The Dawns Here Are Quiet (2015 film), a Russian war drama, based on the novel
- The Dawns Here Are Quiet (opera), a 1973 opera by Kirill Molchanov, based on the novel
