= Masha Mashkova =

Russian-American actress (born 1985)

- Маша Машкова
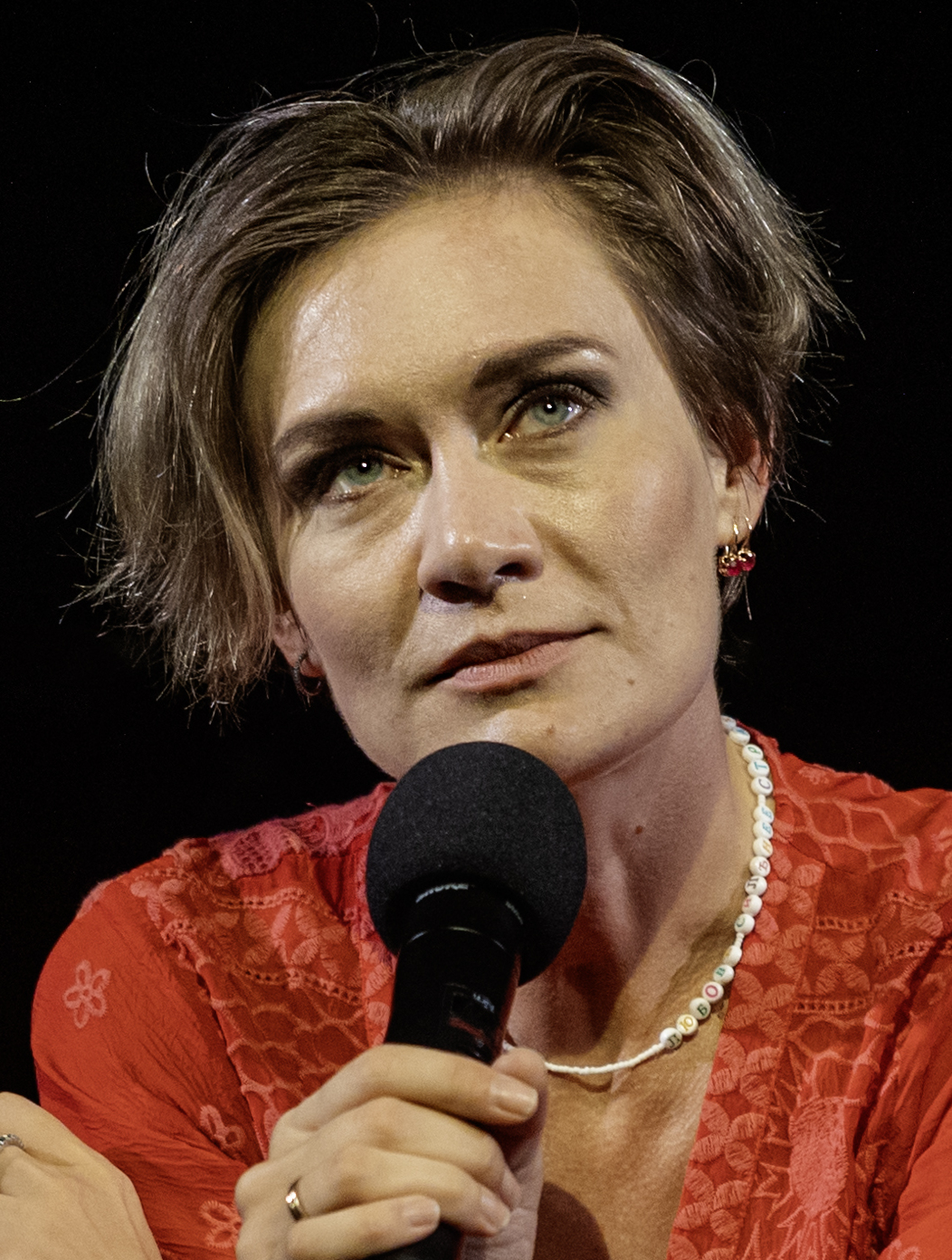
- Born: Maria Vladimirovna Mashkova; April 19, 1985 (age 41); Novosibirsk, Russian SFSR, Soviet Union
- Other name: Masha
- Citizenship: United States
- Education: Novosibirsk State Theater Institute
- Occupation: Actress
- Years active: 1997–present
- Spouses: Artem Semakin (m. 2006; div. 2009) Alexander Alexandrovich Slobodyanik (m. 2009)
- Children: 2

Maria Mashkova (Russian: Мария Машкова; April 19, 1985), known professionally as Masha Mashkova, is a Russian and American actress.

She began her career starring in Russian television series, such as Not Born Beautiful (2005–2006). In 2018, Mashkova made her British television debut in the BBC One crime drama, McMafia. She later made her American television debut in For All Mankind (2023), and later starred in the 2024 science fiction thriller film, I.S.S..

== Early life and education ==
Mashkova was born in Novosibirsk, the daughter of actors Vladimir Mashkov and Yelena Shevchenko, both in whom served in the Mayakovsky Theatre. From early childhood, when her parents left for Moscow to study at theatre universities, and until the age of eight, Mashkova lived in Novosibirsk with her grandmother Valentina, a teacher of ethics and aesthetics at a flight attendant school and grandfather Pavel, a pilot by profession. Her parents divorced when she was two years old. After divorcing, Mashkov continued to live with Mashkova and married for the second time. Shevchenko also remarried and gave birth to two sons, Nikita (b. 1994) and Vsevolod (b. 2002).

== Career ==
In 1992, Mashkova moved to live with her mother in Moscow, where at the age of seven, she first appeared on the stage. Mashkova played a small role on the stage of Mayakovsky Theatre in the play Victoria?. In 2002, when she was in the final eleventh grade of a secondary school with an ethno-cultural bias, in the same theater, she played the main role of Hilda in the play The Master Builder based on the play of the same name by Henrik Ibsen directed by Tatyana Akhramkova.

Mashkova made her film debut at the age of eleven in Vladimir Grammatikov's film A Little Princess (1997), in which she played the role of the mischievous girl Lavinia. In 1998, together with her mother, she starred in Maksim Pezhemsky's popular comedy film Mama Don't Cry, in the role of the hooligan Masha. In 1999, Valery Akhadov's film It is Not Recommended to Offend Women was released, in which Maria played the daughter of the main character.

In 2002, after graduating from high school with a silver medal, Mashkova entered the Plekhanov Russian University of Economics and the Shchukin School, but, having made sure that she could independently enter a theater university, she chose economics. After studying at the academy for two months, secretly from her parents, she decided to transfer to the acting department of the Boris Shchukin Theatre Institute. In 2006, she was accepted into the troupe of the Lenkom Theatre. She left in 2010, before the birth of her daughter.

From 2005 to 2006, Mashkova starred in the Not Born Beautiful, a Russian adaptation of Colombian telenovela, Yo soy Betty, la fea. She later had leading and supporting roles in a number of other Russian television series. She also starred in several feature films, notable action thriller Newsmakers (2009). In 2018, she made her British television debut with a recurring role in the BBC One crime drama, McMafia. After moving to the United States, Mashkova had a recurring role in the fourth season of Apple TV+ space drama series, For All Mankind and co-starred in the thriller limited series, Lady in the Lake. In 2024, she starred in the science fiction thriller film, I.S.S..

== Personal life ==
In 2005, Mashkova married Artem Semakin, a theater and film actor. They met on the set of Don't Be Born Beautiful. The marriage was annulled in early April 2009.

Mashkova's second husband is Alexander Alexandrovich Slobodyanik. Slobodyanik, who is the son of pianist Alexander Slobodyanik, was a musician, businessman, and the owner of a chain of stores selling musical instruments. He is now a screenwriter, film producer, and actor. Mashkova and Slobodyanik got married on September 2, 2009. They have two children. They live in the United States.

According to Masha Mashkova, who is close to her mother and who both reside in the United States, her father Vladimir Mashkov is a staunch supporter of Russia under Vladimir Putin and an ardent pro-Russia, pro-Putin, pro-Kremlin propagandist who firmly supports the Russian invasion of Ukraine. (Note: Masha Mashkov's father Vladimir Mashkov was banned from entering Latvia as of 24 March 2022 after he attended a pro-Russia, pro-Putin, pro-Kremlin ralley at Luzhniki Stadium in Moscow on 18 March 2022 during the Russian invasion of Ukraine to support the anniversary of Russia's occupation of Crimea.)

In 2022, Mashkova spoke out against the Russian invasion of Ukraine on CNN, and condemned her father's statements in support of the government of Vladimir Putin and the invasion. Consequently, she disowned her father.

In 2023, Mashkova became a U.S. citizen and legally changed her name to Masha Mashkova.

== Filmography ==
=== Film ===
Year	Title	Role	Notes
1997	A Little Princess	Lavinia Herbert	
1998	Mama Don't Cry	Masha	
2000	It is Not Recommended to Offend Women	Anyuta	
2004	Daddy		
2005	Mama Don't Cry 2	Olesya	
2007	Sedmoy lepestok		
2008	Closed Spaces	Vika	
2009	Newsmakers	Katya	
2010	Pro lyuboff		
2015	Faena: A Story of a Mother	Nadya	Short film
2016	Pobeg iz Moskvabada	Maria Lastochkina	
2016	Mafia: The Game of Survival		
2020	Igray so mnoy		
2024	I.S.S.	Weronika Vetrov	
2024	Limonov: The Ballad	Anna	Post-production
TBA	Debate	Maria	Post-production

=== Television ===
Year	Title	Role	Notes
2003	Next 2	Svetlana	Recurring role
2005–2006	Not Born Beautiful	Masha	Series regular, 200 episodes
2006	Talisman lyubvi	Stesha Kovrigina	Series regular, 60 episodes
2006	Vse smeshalos v dome...	Yulia	Series regular, 10 episodes
2009	Operatsiya 'Pravednik'	Lila	Television film
2011	Chyornaya metka	Zhanna	Television film
2011	Zabytyy	Lyudmila Mishina	4 episodes
2012	Moya bolshaya semya	Margarita	Series regular, 12 episodes
2012	Okhota na gaulyaytera	Mariya Osipova	Series regular, 10 episodes
2012	Veronika. Poteryannoe schaste	Zoya	Series regular, 16 episodes
2013	Idealnyy brak	Natalya	Series regular, 8 episodes
2013	Bednaya Liz	Elizaveta Sokolova	Television film
2018	McMafia	Masha	Recurring role, 5 episodes
2018	Lapsi	Vera	Series regular, 16 episodes
2018	Sveta s togo sveta	Sveta	Series regular, 35 episodes
2019	Solyonaya karamel	Polina	Television film
2020	Perevod s nemetskogo	Irina Voskresenskaya	Television film
2021	Krepostnaya	Rogneda Bezus	Series regular, 24 episodes
2022	YuZZZ	Polina	Series regular, 8 episodes
2022	Zhenshchina v sostoyanii razvoda	Vera	Series regular, 8 episodes
2022	Barentsevo more	Valentina	Series regular, 8 episodes
2023	For All Mankind	Svetlana Zakharova	Recurring role, 3 episodes
2024	NCIS: Hawai'i	Tatyana Sokolova	Episode: "Serve and Protect
2024	Lady in the Lake		
