= 1995 Airstan Ilyushin Il-76 hijacking =

1995 aircraft hijacking in Afghanistan

Coordinates: 31.503°N 65.851°E

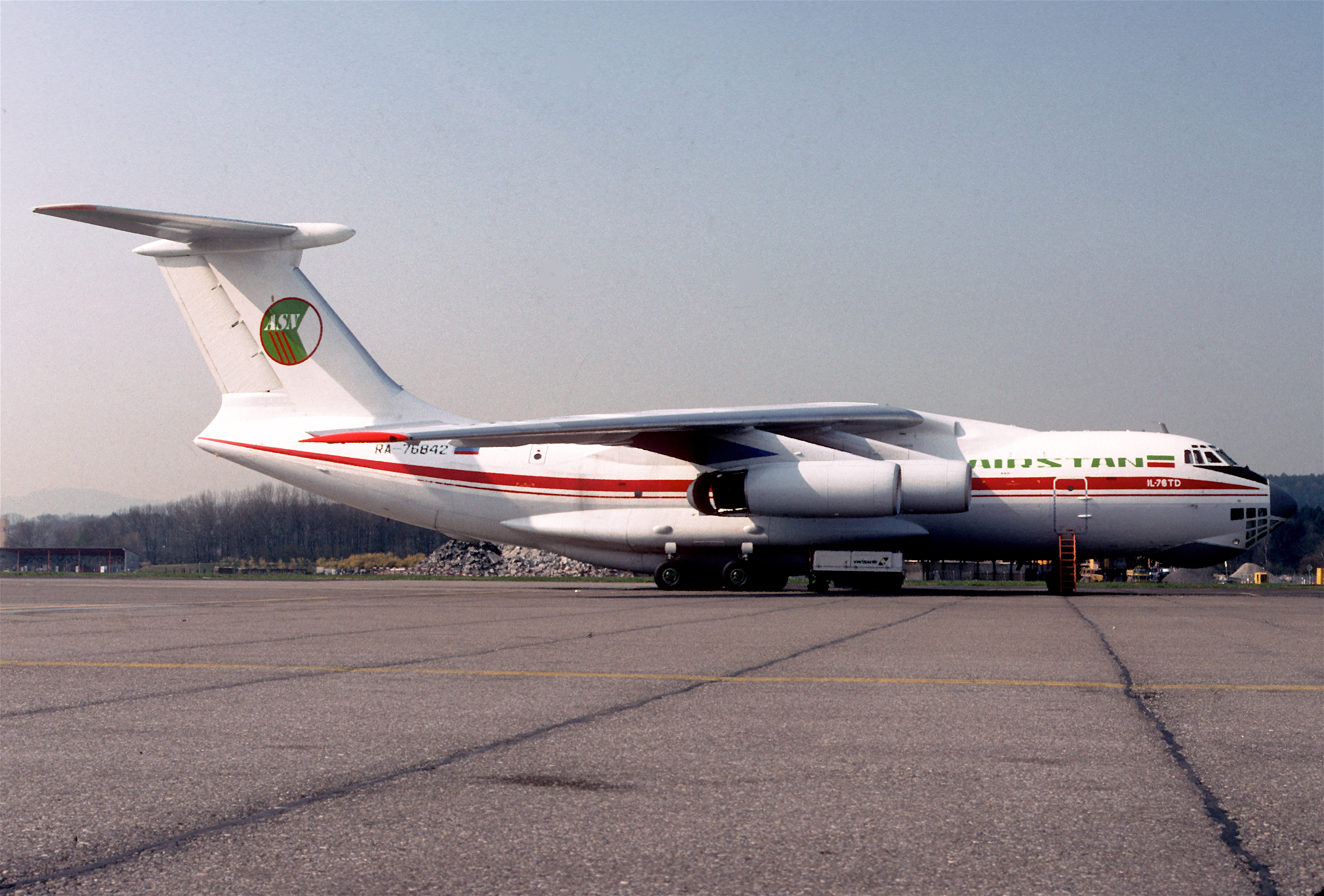
- RA-76842, the aircraft involved in the hijacking, seen in April 1995

Hijacking
- Date: 3 August 1995 – 16 August 1996
- Summary: Fighter interception and impound
- Site: Kandahar International Airport, Kandahar, Afghanistan

Aircraft
- Aircraft type: Ilyushin Il-76TD
- Operator: Airstan
- Registration: RA-76842
- Occupants: 7
- Passengers: 0
- Crew: 7
- Fatalities: 0
- Survivors: 7

The 1995 Airstan Ilyushin Il-76 hijacking took place on 3 August 1995, Taliban-controlled fighter aircraft intercepted an Airstan Ilyushin Il-76 transport aircraft, with seven Russian nationals on board, forcing it to land at Taliban-occupied Kandahar International Airport. The men were held prisoner for over a year before making their escape; after overpowering their captors they repossessed their aircraft, flying it to freedom towards Russia.

== Background ==
In 1995, Afghanistan was in a state of civil war. In late 1994, the Taliban movement sprang out of Kandahar and by early 1995 had taken control of most of the country south of Kabul, forcing other Afghan groups to abandon territory. In August 1995 the Russian crew of the Ilyushin Il-76 was working for Tatarstan-based Airstan, which was in turn leasing their plane to Rus Trans Avia Export, a Russian company based in Sharjah, United Arab Emirates. On board the plane were Russian nationals: Captain Vladimir Sharpatov, First Officer Gazinur Khairullin, Navigator Alexander Zdor, and 4 crew members not in the cockpit: Askhad Abbyazov, Yuri Vshivtsev, Sergei Butuzov and Viktor Ryazanov. They were transporting 30 tons of weapons from Albania to the besieged Afghan President Burhanuddin Rabbani.

== Capture and captivity ==
On 3 August 1995, a Taliban air force MiG-21 aircraft forced the Russian aircraft to land at Kandahar. Negotiations between the Russian government and the Taliban to free the men stalled for over a year and efforts by U.S. senator Hank Brown to mediate between the two parties broke down over a prisoner exchange. The Taliban stated that they would free the airmen if the Russians released Afghans held by the Russian government. However the Russians denied holding any Afghan citizens. Brown was able to get the Taliban to agree that the Russian crew should be allowed to maintain their aircraft. This request paved the way for their escape.

== Escape ==
The Russians had been planning their escape for over a year. After Hank Brown secured visits to their aircraft for the whole crew they not only did routine maintenance but secretly prepared it for flight. On each trip, the crew would be guarded by six Taliban guards but on 16 August 1996, half of the guards left the crew for afternoon prayers. Seizing the opportunity, the Russians overpowered the remaining guards and the pilot was able to start one engine from the auxiliary power unit (itself started with a battery). With one engine running, the remaining three could easily be started. The aircraft, with all seven of the crew aboard, quickly taxied down the runway. The Taliban tried to block the runway with a fire truck but the aircraft was able to take to the air, thus avoiding the obstacle. The escapees were able to quickly exit Taliban controlled airspace and charted a course to the United Arab Emirates. The crew's escape was greeted with excitement and relief by the Russians and Russian president Boris Yeltsin telephoned the crewmen to congratulate them as they flew to Russia on a Russian government aircraft.

== In popular culture ==
- In 2001 the men released a book about their ordeal, called Escape from Kandahar.
- Kandahar, a 2010 Russian film by Andrei Kavun details the Russian crew's ordeal in captivity and their escape.
- The story of this is included in Operation Man Hunt (ISBN 978-1-78747-545-8) by Damien Lewis

== Bibliography ==
Notes

References

- Associated Press (19 August 1996). "Daredevil airmen receive warm homecoming". The Register-Guard. Archived from the original on 22 September 2015.
- BBC Monitoring (29 October 2001). "Escape from Kandahar". BBC News. Archived from the original on 19 August 2010.
- Bratersky, Alexander (9 February 2010). "Afghan Escape Film 'Kandahar' Pulls in Crowds". The St. Petersburg Times. Archived from the original on 14 February 2010.
- Farah, Douglas; Braun, Stephen (2007). Merchant of death: money, guns, planes, and the man who makes war possible (2007 ed.). John Wiley and Sons. ISBN 978-0-470-04866-5. - Total pages: 308
- Pittsburgh Post-Gazette (19 August 1996). "7 Russians escape after year as hostages". Pittsburgh Post-Gazette. Archived from the original on 2 November 2022.
- Reeves, Phil (19 August 1996). "Russian airmen escape from Afghanistan". The Independent. Archived from the original on 19 August 2010.
- Washington Times (19 August 1996). "Russian hostages describe escape". The Washington Times. Archived from the original on 2 November 2022.
