= Roman Karmen =

Soviet cameraman and film director

- Роман Кармен
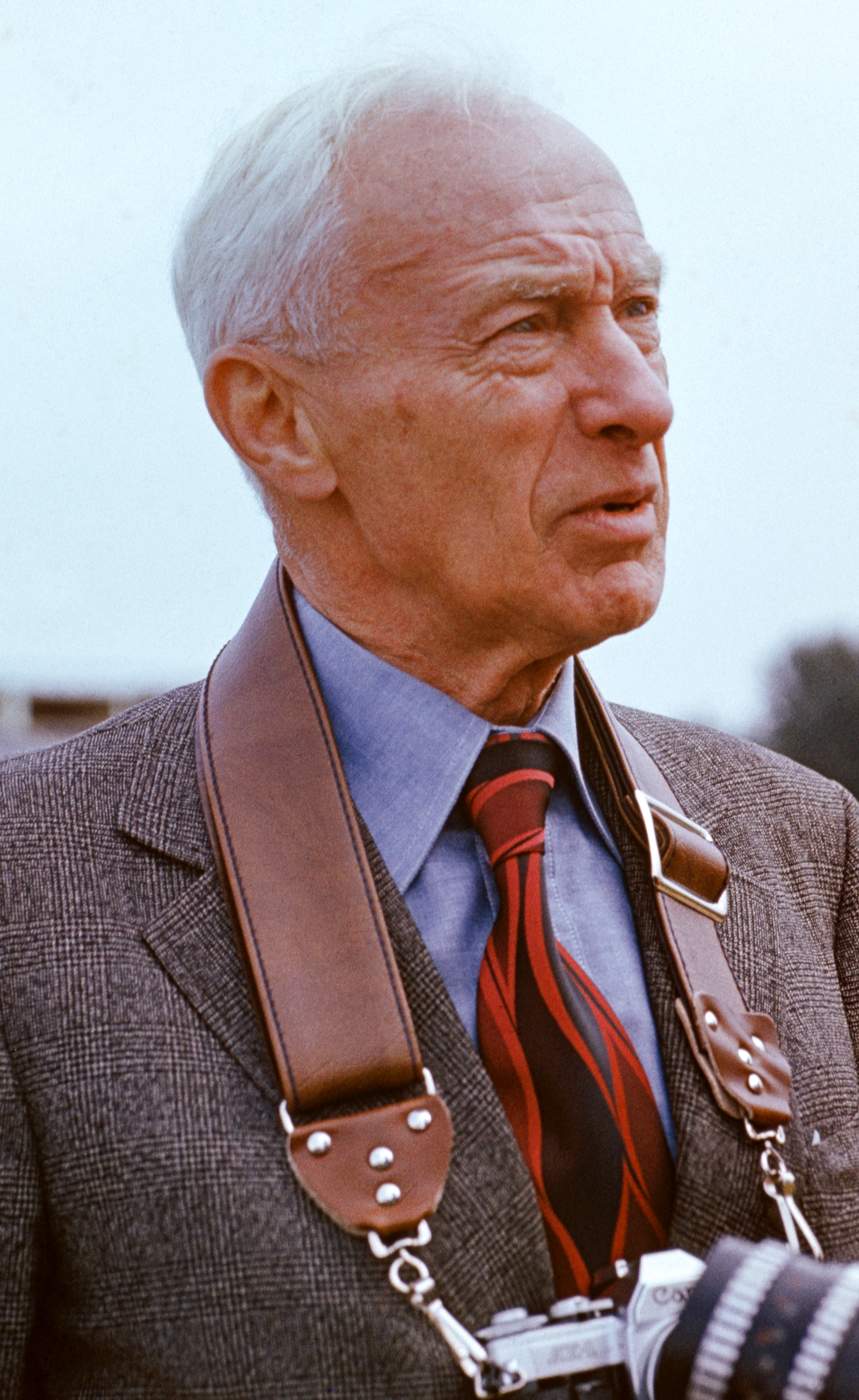
- Karmen in 1975
- Born: Efraim Leyzorovich Korenman; 30 November [O.S. 17 November] 1906; Odesa, Russian Empire (present-day Ukraine)
- Died: 28 April 1978 (aged 71); Moscow, Russian SFSR, Soviet Union
- Occupations: Film director; War cinematographer; Documentary filmmaker; Journalist; Screenwriter; Pedagogue; Publicist

Roman Lazarevich Karmen (Note: Russian: Роман Лазаревич Кармен, romanized: Roman Lazarevich Karmen; Ukrainian: Роман Лазарович Кармен, romanized: Roman Lazarovych Karmen) (30 November [O.S. 17 November] 1906 – 28 April 1978, born Efraim Leyzorovich Korenman) (Note: Russian: Эфраим Лейзорович Коренман, romanized: Efraim Leyzorovich Korenman) was a Soviet film director, war cinematographer, documentary filmmaker, journalist, screenwriter, pedagogue, and publicist.

== Biography ==
Karmen was born to a Jewish family in Odessa. His father was the writer Lazar Karmen (real name Leyzor Korenman) and his mother was the translator Dina Leypuner.

== Career ==
Karmen was a communist.

He documented the Spanish Civil War. Karmen also documented the battles for Moscow and Leningrad in World War II, the First Indochina War, and the rise of communism in Southeast Asia in the 1950s and in South America during the 1960s.

Karmen was also granted personal access to the emergence of communist leaders like Vietnam's Ho Chi Minh and Cuba's Fidel Castro, and Chile's socialist president Salvador Allende.

Karmen went to Yan'an in 1939, where he met Mao Zedong and other Chinese leaders and filmed during May and June 1939.

Among his well-known works are such films as Spain (1939); Moscow Strikes Back (1942); Leningrad in Struggle (1942); Berlin (1945); Judgment of the Peoples (1946, about the Nuremberg trials); A Tale of the Caspian Oil Workers (1953); Vietnam (1955); Morning of India (1956); Great Is My Country (1958 — the first Soviet panoramic film); Conquerors of the Sea (1959); The Burning Island (1961); The Great Patriotic War (1965); Grenada, Grenada, Grenada of Mine… (1968, together with K. M. Simonov); Comrade Berlin (1969); and The Burning Continent (1972).

== Style ==
Karmen's documentary methods were both influential and controversial; his renowned technical ability captured the emotion of war and the repetition of key shots and framings between film projects became a hallmark, but he would often blur the lines of cinéma vérité by restaging key battles, including the lifting of the siege of Leningrad (Leningrad in Combat, 1942), the Viet Minh victory at the Battle of Dien Bien Phu (Vietnam, 1955), and the 1956 landing in Cuba of militants led by Fidel Castro, re-enacted as a first person documentary.

In 2001, French documentary directors Dominique Chapuis and Patrick Barbéris produced a 90-minute film, titled Roman Karmen: A Cineast In The Revolution's Service. The following year Barbéris (his co-author Chapuis had died in late 2001) published the portrait Roman Karmen, A Red Legend.

== Filmography ==
De Castries' bunker in Вьетнам, 1955

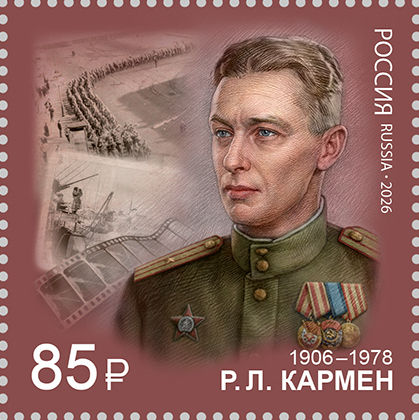
Karmen on a 2026 stamp of Russia

- 1939: Испания (Spain), about the Spanish Civil War
- 1942: Leningrad in Combat, about the siege of Leningrad
- 1942: Moscow Strikes Back, about the Battle of Moscow
- 1945: Fall of Berlin – 1945, about the Battle of Berlin
- 1946: Nuremberg Trials, about the Nuremberg trials. An English language version was made.
- 1953: Story of Caspian Oilmen, about the oil-industry workers of the Caspian region)
- 1955: Vietnam, about the Battle of Dien Bien Phu
- 1956: Утро Индии (Indian Morning)
- 1958: Great Is My Country, the first Soviet motion picture produced in Kinopanorama.
- 1959: Покорители моря (Conquerors of the sea)
- 1961: Пылающий остров (Blazing island), about the Bay of Pigs Invasion
- 1965: Великая отечественная (Great Patriotic War), 20th anniversary of the end of the German-Soviet War
- 1967: Гренада, Гренада, Гренада моя... (Grenada, Grenada, my Grenada…), co-directed with Konstantin Simonov, about the Spanish Civil War
- 1969: Товарищ Берлин (Berlin Kamarad)
- 1972: Пылающий континент (Blazing continent)
- 1976: Сердце Корвалана (Corvalán's heart), about the imprisoned general secretary of the Communist Party of Chile, Luis Corvalán

== See also ==
- The Unknown War (TV series)
- Konstantin Simonov
- Leni Riefenstahl
- Frank Capra
- Robert Riskin
- Pierre Schoendoerffer
- Europe Central

== Awards ==
- Lenin Prize (1960)
- USSR State Prize (1975)
- Stalin Prize first degree (1942)
- Stalin Prize second degree (1947)
- Stalin Prize third degree (1952)
- People's Artist of the USSR (1966)
- Hero of Socialist Labour (1976)
