= Kirill Molchanov =

Russian composer

Kirill Vladimirovich Molchanov (Russian: Кирилл Владимирович Молчанов; 7 September 1922 – 14 March 1982) was a Russian and Soviet composer.

He was appointed director of the Bolshoi, at the time political disfavour had fallen on the lead soprano Galina Vishnevskaya.

His works are in the Social Realist romantic tradition and were not warmly received when performed abroad.

== Works ==
=== Operas ===
Taken from:

- The Stone Flower (Каменный цветок) inspired by Pavel Bazhov's story of the same name, Moscow, 1950
- Dawn (Заря) on the play of Boris Lavrenyov "Rift" «Разлом», Moscow, 1956
- Via del Corno (Улица дель Корно) based on a novel by Vasco Pratolini, own libretto, Moscow, 1960
- Romeo, Juliet and Darkness (Ромео, Джульетта и тьма) based on the novel of Jan Otčenášek, own libretto. Leningrad, 1963
- The Unknown Soldier (Неизвестный солдат) own libretto. Voronezh, 1967
- Russian woman (Русская женщина) (on the novel by Yuri Nagibin "Petticoat Government" «Бабье царство» own libretto. Voronezh, 1969)
- The Dawns Here Are Quiet (Зори здесь тихие) on the novel by Boris Vasilyev own libretto, Frunze, 1973

=== Musicals ===
- Odysseus, Penelope, and others (Одиссей, Пенелопа и другие) inspired by Homer, own libretto, 1970

=== Works for soloist, chorus and orchestra ===
- Cantata poem "Song of Friendship" (lyrics by N. Dorizo, 1954)

=== Works for piano ===
- A cycle of Russian paintings (1953)

=== Works for voice and piano ===
- Cycle to words by the Cuban poet Nicolás Guillén (1956),
- Cycle to words by Langston Hughes (1958),
- Cycle to the words of Soviet poets (1961)
- Cycle to the words of Federico García Lorca (1963),
- Hiroshima Song (lyrics by modern Japanese poets, 1964)
- Black Box "Черная шкатулка", lyrics of the Czech writer Ludwig Ashkenazy, (1967)
- Love lyrics of contemporary poets from different countries, (1972)
- To the words of Sergei Yesenin (1972)
- The Sonnets of Petrarch (1974)
- Miniatures, lyrics of Bai Juyi, (1974)

Songs including:

- Here are the soldiers go (lyrics by Mikhail Grigorievich Lvovskii 1919-1994)
- Fires are so many gold (lyrics by N. Dorizo)

=== Theatre Music ===
To over 30 dramatic productions, including:

- "Mary Stuart" Schiller (Moscow Art Academic Theatre MAT, 1956)
- "Three Fat Men" Olesha (MAT, 1961)
- "Kola Bryunon" R. Rolland (MAT, 1972)

== Music for films ==
More than 30, including:

- Great is my Country Shyroka Strana Moya Rodnaya (1958)
- It Happened in Penkovo «Дело было в Пенькове» (1957)
- "Intractable" «Неподдающиеся» (1959)
- "On the Seven Winds" «На семи ветрах» (1962)
- "Shore" «Увольнение на берег» (1962)
- "Halt" «Полустанок» (1963)
- We'll Live Till Monday «Доживём до понедельника» (1968)
- The Dawns Here Are Quiet «А зори здесь тихие» (1972).

=== Ballets ===
- Macbeth
- Three Cards (Russian: Три карты, romanized: Tri karty)

== Recordings ==
- Macbeth, Ballet: Alexei Fadayechev, Nina Timofeyeva, staged by Vladimir Vasiliev, the Bolshoi theater orchestra conducted by Fuat Mansurov, D1115 Kultur.
