= Klebanov =

Klebanov is a surname. Notable people with the surname include:

- Anatoly Klebanov (1952–2011), Soviet water polo player
- Dmitri Klebanov (1907–1987), Ukrainian Soviet composer
- Eugene Klebanov (born 1954), Russian rugby player and coach
- Igor Klebanov (born 1962), American physicist
- Ilya Klebanov (born 1951), Russian politician
- Sam Klebanov (born 1965), Russian/Swedish film distributor and producer
