= Newsmakers =

- Film poster
- Directed by: Anders Banke
- Screenplay by: Sam Klebanov; Aleksandr Lungin
- Story by: Tin-Shing Yip; Hing-Ka Chan
- Based on: Breaking News by Johnnie To
- Produced by: Sam Klebanov; Aleksandr Lungin; Peter Hiltunen; Anna Katchko; Thomas Eskilsson; Magnus Paulsson
- Starring: Andrey Merzlikin; Yevgeny Tsyganov; Mariya Mashkova; Maksim Konovalov; Aleksey Frandetti; Pavel Klimov; Artyom Semakin; Sergey Garmash
- Cinematography: Chris Maris
- Edited by: Fredrik Morheden
- Music by: Anthony Lledo
- Production companies: Tandem Pictures; Illusion Film & Television; Kino Bez Granits; Solid Entertainment; Film i Väst
- Distributed by: Kino Bez Granits
- Release date: 7 May 2009
- Running time: 102 minutes
- Country: Russia
- Language: Russian
- Budget: $4 million

Newsmakers (Russian: Горячие новости, romanized: Goryachie novosti, Swedish: Polisstyrka X7) is a 2009 Russian action thriller film directed by Swedish director Anders Banke. It is a remake of the Hong Kong film Breaking News by Johnnie To.

== Plot ==
Moscow police officer Smirnov sets out to capture the violent gangleader Herman after a failed robbery. Meanwhile, Smirnov superiors are trying to find a way to better the reputation of the Moscow police. The young eager pr-girl Katya suggests that they should turn the capture of Herman into a reality show, showing off the police as action heroes. The situation gets complicated when Herman and his gang tries the same tactic. The situation soon escalates into a fullblown war, both in media and on the streets.

== Cast ==
- Andrey Merzlikin as Smirnov
- Yevgeny Tsyganov as Herman
- Mariya Mashkova as Katya
- Maksim Konovalov as Kley
- Aleksey Frandetti as Orda
- Pavel Klimov as Kolyan
- Sergei Vesnin as Kon
- Sergey Garmash as Killer
- Artyom Semakin as Valery
- Viktor Chepelov as Sanya
- David Stepanyan as Hamlet
- Oleg Chernigov as Mikhalych
- Pyotr Rytov as Polyakov
- Yuri Shlykov as Boldyrev
- Vladimir Mikhaliuk as Petrushin
- Grigory Baranov as Yura
- Ivan Sukhanov as Vadik
- Sonya Hilkevich as Sonya
- Aleksandr Raschupkin as Vovchik
- Sam Klebanov as Roman
- Loa Falkman as Tillström
- Pavel Stepanov as Traffic police officer
- Jurij Kruglov as Traffic police officer
- Pavel Misailov as Crying policeman

== Production ==
Anders Banke's horror/black comedy film Frostbite about a gang of teen vampires spreading fear in an arctic town in the far north of Sweden became the highest grossing independent film in Russia 2006, received very positive reviews and reached cult status. The Russian distributors of Frostbite where moving into producing their own films and asked Banke if he wanted to helm a Russian language remake of Johnnie To's film Breaking News and he agrees. Anders Banke who had learned Russian when he got a chance to study film on VGIK had no problem directing the Russian cast. Fittingly, Banke's frequent collaborator Chris Maris had also studied at VGIK. The film was shot in Trollhättan in Sweden and in Moscow. The film was shot on 35 mm like Frostbite as Anders Banke dislikes filming digitally.

== Music ==
The score was composed by Anthony Lledo and performed by the Danish National Chamber Orchestra. Leaders of Men by Joy Division is featured prominently in the film.

== Response and boxoffice ==
Despite an aggressive promotional campaign—producer Klebanov and the film's cast personally presented the film in nearly 20 Russian cities—the film enjoyed scant popularity among Russian audiences and film critics. The producers attributed film's lack of commercial success to its May release, suggesting that May's warm temperatures discourage people from going to the movies. Russians' current lack of interest in national cinema, the alleged absence of a star system in Russia, and—somewhat ironically—the film's insufficient promotion in the Russian media were also cited as culprits in the film's unfavorable commercial and critical reception.

Splash Magazine included the film on its Top Ten list from Tribeca Film Festival 2009 citing it as a must see.

Tiny Beam of Light also provided a positive review of the film praising the score and the entertainment value.
