= Yelena Shevchenko (actress) =

Russian actress

- Born: 23 October 1964 (age 61); Novosibirsk, Soviet Union
- Citizenship: United States
- Education: Novosibirsk State Theater Institute
- Occupation: Actress
- Years active: 1990–2020
- Spouses: Vladimir Mashkov (divorced) Igor Lebedev (divorced); Boris Palant (m. 2019)
- Children: 3, including Masha Mashkova

Yelena Pavlovna Shevchenko (Russian: Елена Павловна Шевченко; born 23 October 1964) is a Soviet-born American stage and film actress. She has starred in films in Ukraine and the United States.

== Biography ==
Shevchenko was born in the family of a pilots near Novosibirsk. Not yet graduating from school, she entered the Novosibirsk State Theater Institute. Shevchenko later received a certificate of secondary education at a school for working youth. At NSTI, Shevchenko attended the same course with Vladimir Mashkov, whom she soon married.

In 1985, Shevchenko had a daughter, Masha. After graduating from college in the same year, she went to Moscow, where her husband already lived. In the same year, Shevchenko entered the Lunacharsky State Institute for Theatre Arts, where she studied at the course of Andrey Goncharov and graduated in 1990.

Shevchenko's film debut took place in 1991, and one of her first films "Black and White" - was filmed in the United States in English. Thanks to this film, she was invited to the Mayakovsky Theatre, which was directed by Goncharov. After working in the theater for ten years, she left it.

== Personal life ==
Shevchenko has a daughter from her first marriage with Mashkov named Masha (born 1985) and two granddaughters Stefania and Alexandra. Shevchenko's second husband is Igor Lebedev, a graduate of the directing department of GITIS, currently the director of the Carmen-Video company. They have two sons, Nikita (born 1994) and Vsevolod (born 2002). In November 2019, she married her third husband, American lawyer Boris Palant.
