= His Name Was Not Listed =

- Directed by: Sergey Korotayev
- Written by: Oleg Antonov
- Based on: His Name Was Not Listed by Boris Vasilyev
- Produced by: Vladimir Mashkov; Aleksandr Zharov; Timur Vaynshteyn; Alexey Zemsky; Tina Kandelaki; Mikhail Pogosov; Marina Razumova; Boris Khanchalyan; Yevgeny Mishiev; Sergey Kosinsky; Andrey Tereshok; Danil Badreev; Elena Torchinskaya; Vladimir Shaposhnikov; Roman Elistratov; Oleg Blank; Vadim Epshtein; Elena Efimova; Oleg Selistra Jr.
- Starring: Vladislav Miller (ru); Alyona Morilova; Vladimir Mashkov
- Cinematography: Igor Grinyakin
- Edited by: Aleksandr Chudinov; Aleksey Kumakshin; Mariya Likhacheva; Anton Kovalev; Andrey Poluboyarinov; Margarita Smirnova
- Music by: Nikolai Rostov
- Production companies: Gazprom-Media; NTV; Temp Film Company; 1-2-3 Production; TROMEDIA; Oleg Tabakov Theatre; Cinema Fund; Government of Moscow
- Distributed by: Central Partnership
- Release dates: April 28, 2025 (Karo 11 October); May 1, 2025 (Russia)
- Running time: 120 minutes
- Country: Russia
- Language: Russian
- Budget: ₽1 billion
- Box office: ₽644 million

His Name Was Not Listed (Russian: В списках не значился, romanized: V spiskakh ne znachilsya) is a 2025 Russian war drama film directed by Sergey Korotayev about the Great Patriotic War, it is based on the novel His Name Was Not Listed by Boris Vasilyev. It stars Vladislav Miller, Alyona Morilova and Vladimir Mashkov.

The pre-premiere screening took place on April 28, 2025, at the Karo 11 October cinema center in Moscow. This film was theatrically released in Russia on International Workers' Day, May 1, 2025, by Central Partnership.

== Plot ==
The film takes place in 1941. Lieutenant Nikolai Pluzhnikov is assigned to the Brest Fortress on duty. And then, at 4 a.m., the war begins...

== Cast ==
- Vladislav Miller as Lieutenant Nikolai Pluzhnikov
- Alyona Morilova as Mirra
- Vladimir Mashkov as Sergeant Major Stepan Matveyevich
- Pavel Chernyshyov as Salnikov
- Yana Sekste as Aunt Khristya
- Vitaly Egorov as Svitsky
- Yevgeny Miller as Sergeant Fedorchuk
- Egor Manakov as Vasya Volkov
- Pavel Shevando as Lieutenant

== Production ==
=== Casting ===
As Vladislav Miller, who played the lead role of Nikolai Pluzhnikov, noted, the actors were specially made up to convey the "horrors of trench life during war" imprinted on the faces of the film's characters.

=== Filming ===
Principal photography in the fall of 2024, in the cities of Brest and Minsk, Belarus, and the region of Moscow Oblast. For the film, a replica of the Brest Fortress was built on the grounds of the Moskino cinema park in Moscow, and the interior of St. Casimir's Cathedral was also recreated. The filmmakers, for their part, are positioning it as "the country's premier film project". According to them, the film's budget was 1 billion rubles. The filming process was completed at the end of December 2024.

== Release ==
=== Theatrical ===
His Name Was Not Listed was the opening film of the 47th Moscow International Film Festival. A pre-premiere screening took place at the Karo 11 October cinema center on New Arbat Avenue in Moscow on April 28, 2025. The nationwide premiere of the film, timed to coincide with the 80th anniversary of Victory Day, took place on May 1, 2025.

The film flopped at the box office, resulting in losses amounting to hundreds of millions of rubles.

== See also ==
- I, a Russian soldier (1995 film)
