= Sherlock Holmes (2013 TV series) =

2013 TV series

- Official poster
- Шерлок Холмс; Sherlok Kholms
- Genre: Crime drama
- Created by: Ruben Dishdishyan; Based on the works of; Sir Arthur Conan Doyle
- Written by: Andrey Kavun; Leonid Porokhin; Oleg Pogodin
- Directed by: Andrey Kavun
- Starring: Igor Petrenko; Andrei Panin; Lyanka Gryu; Mikhail Boyarsky; Ingeborga Dapkūnaitė; Alexey Gorbunov
- Composer: Gary Miller
- Country of origin: Russia
- Original language: Russian
- No. of series: 1
- No. of episodes: 8 (list of episodes)

Production
- Executive producer: Ruben Dishdishyan 2.3
- Cinematography: Central Partnership
- Camera setup: Dolby Digital
- Running time: 704 minutes
- Production companies: Rossiya 1; Central Partnership
- Budget: About $ 650,000,000 US

Original release
- Network: Russia 1
- Release: November 18 – November 28, 2013

Sherlock Holmes (Russian: Шерлок Холмс, romanized: Sherlok Kholms) is a Russian television crime drama series based on the Sherlock Holmes detective stories by Arthur Conan Doyle and aired in 18 November 2013. It stars Igor Petrenko as Sherlock Holmes and Andrei Panin as Dr. Watson. Eight episodes were produced.

This is the last film role of Andrei Panin, who died before he was able to complete the dubbing of his lines as Dr. Watson. However, they were able to finish the film almost entirely using the sound recorded on set, with only a small contribution by another voice actor.

== Background ==
London in the 19th century is a grimy, dirty, dangerous place. Twenty-seven-year-old Sherlock Holmes (Igor Petrenko) meets with Dr. John Watson (Andrei Panin) - a veteran Army doctor who has just returned from the war in Afghanistan. They both live in cramped rented rooms in central London at a boarding house run by Mrs Hudson (Ingeborga Dapkūnaitė). Considering his young detective friend to be a genius, Watson decides to write about the detective's talent, and discloses the mysteries to the whole world in his stories, which often embellish events, based on the cynical advice of a veteran Publisher (Aleksandr Adabashyan) with a keen sense of what sells.

The real Holmes is an awkward, intense, nerdy younger man. His violin playing sounds terrible, and he is neither a martial arts expert nor a crack shot Dr Watson makes him out to be. In fact, he doesn't even own a gun. Sherlock Holmes smokes cigarettes, but Watson comes up with the idea of the famous pipe for effect. The trademark Sherlock Holmes hat and cape were made up by Watson, as was Holmes' upper-class background. Neither of them is well off.

The two are often invited to take part in investigations by an inspector from Scotland Yard, Inspector Lestrade (Mikhail Boyarsky), whose search for the perpetrator often comes to a standstill. The genius investigator and the Doctor confront extraordinary villains: Professor Moriarty (Alexey Gorbunov), charming Irene Adler (Lyanka Gryu), and others.

== Plot ==
The story begins when Dr. Watson, newly arrived and in search of lodging in London, runs into Holmes at the scene of a fatal accident, which Holmes immediately recognizes as murder. He ends up renting a room at Mrs Hudson's, next door to Holmes. Mrs Hudson is a younger and more attractive woman than Watson makes her out to be. She has taken a liking to Watson, but has a problem with Holmes who has no clear occupation and disturbs other tenants with his violin playing and science experiments.

Dr. Watson shortly gets involved in his new friend's life full of exciting and dangerous adventures and becomes his loyal sidekick. He is also trying to build a private medical practice, and to make a name for himself as a writer. His heroic war poetry is turned down by the publisher who convinces him to focus on writing detective stories instead.

== Production ==
"Holmes and Watson are characters which were screened, are screening and will be screened. I must say without exaggeration that this is like Hamlet. However, a director should venture upon this with something new of his own. Sherlock Holmes is literature for young people. Traditionally films are engaged in a search for the meaning of life, but this is a pure detective genre, adventure. In short, this is a direct test for professional self-determination"

— Andrei Kavun

The idea for a new Russian TV series about Sherlock Holmes was first announced in 2009, shortly before the release of Guy Ritchie's Sherlock Holmes. But the choosing of the director and actors was much delayed, and the première was therefore put off for 3 years. The official production of the series only began in 2011.

Andrey Kavun, who is known for his work on the film "Kandahar", was appointed director. Igor Petrenko was chosen for the role of Sherlock, and Andrei Panin was cast as Dr. Watson. For the role of Inspector Lestrade, Mikhail Boyarsky was chosen.

All surveys of Victorian England were held in eight months of filmings Russia, and the filmings were held in the vicinity of St. Petersburg - Vyborg, Kronstadt, Pushkin, Gatchina and Ivangorod. In total, the work on Sherlock Holmes, launched in September 2011, lasted 161 days of shooting. The filming was completed in May 2012 and the production was completed in late October 2012.

Influenced by Guy Ritchie's film, the role of the heroine, Irene Adler, was also expanded on during the show. Her love affair with Sherlock Holmes is one of the series' main storylines. She was portrayed by actress Lyanka Gryu. Kavun has also said he only plans to use the motives of the original stories, but will recreate the stories almost from scratch. The series will also assume that Watson's descriptions of the crimes have been embellished. Later he will try to adjust reality to his fantasies. As an example, Holmes' famous pipe will be replaced by cigarettes.

Unlike most adaptations of Sherlock Holmes, Sherlock in this adaptation is younger than Dr. Watson by 15 years., and the series was aired on channel Russia-1.

== Cast ==
- Igor Petrenko as Sherlock Holmes/Mycroft Holmes
- Andrei Panin as Dr. Watson
- Lyanka Gryu as Irene Adler
- Mikhail Boyarsky as Inspector Lestrade
- Ingeborga Dapkūnaitė as Mrs Hudson
- Alexey Gorbunov as Professor Moriarty
- Alexander Golubev as Reginald Musgrave
- Elizaveta Boyarskaya as Louise Bernett
- Leonid Yarmolnik as Branton
- Andrei Merzlikin as Helifax/Traut/Backley
- Igor Sklyar as Thaddeus Sholto
- Aleksandr Adabashyan as the editor
- Darya Jurgens as Jessica Kerry
- Anatoly Rudakov as Inspector Tracy
- Danila Shevchenko as Arthur Cadogan West
- Rina Grishina as Violet Westberry
- Svetlana Kryuchkova as Queen Victoria
- Oleg Feodorov as Kaiser Wilhelm II
- Mikhail Evlanov as Peter Small
- Sergey Migitsko as Philip McIntyre
- Semyon Strugachyov as Charles Gautier
- Yaroslav Boyko as Wicky
- Andrei Zibrov as Charlie Williams
- Aleksey Shevchenkov as Higgins
- Olga Krasko as Miss Baker
- Olga Volkova as Lady Emma Neligan
- Sergey Burunov as Tom Taylor
- Aleksandr Bashirov as Kerslake

== Episodes ==
| No. | Title | Directed by | Written by | Original release date | Viewers (millions) |
|---|---|---|---|---|---|
| 1–2 | "221B Baker Street" | Andrey Kavun | Oleg Pogodin, Leonid Porokhin | November 18, 2013 | N/A |
Dr. John Watson, a former military and medical officer, has just arrived in London after having been wounded during his service in Afghanistan. Alone without friends and family he starts looking for a flat, but he soon meets a stranger, a young man who seems to disturb the work of the local policemen from Scotland Yard as well as their chief, Inspector Lestrade. The young man describes himself as a private detective named Sherlock Holmes, together he and Watson decide to share a flat at 221B Baker Street. Watson however soon realises that he might be putting his life in danger by sharing a flat with his new friend. Loosely adapted from "The Adventure of Black Peter", "A Scandal in Bohemia", and "The Adventure of Charles Augustus Milverton".
| 3–4 | "Rock, Scissors, Paper" | Andrey Kavun | Oleg Pogodin | November 19, 2013 | N/A |
Peter Small, an old friend of Dr. Watson, dies while visiting Watson in his flat at Baker Street. Holmes tries to find the murderer, but begins to believe that Small was connected to a Band of Cabmen that have been committing crimes without ever being caught. The only clue to them is an old picture that was taken years ago, during their studies. But after Sherlock Holmes is visited by a young woman named Irene Adler comes in his flat, the picture is gone. Loosely adapted from The Sign of Four and "The Disappearance of Lady Frances Carfax".
| 5–6 | "Clowns" | Andrey Kavun | Leonid Porokhin | November 20, 2013 | N/A |
A photographer is killed by bomb explosion in central London, and Holmes has to find the connection between the stolen picture and the bombing. He soon learns of the kidnapping of Irene Adler and understands that he has to sacrifice something in exchange for her release. Loosely adapted from "The Adventure of the Bruce-Partington Plans" and "A Scandal in Bohemia".
| 7–8 | "The Mistress of Lord Maulbré" | Andrey Kavun | Leonid Porokhin | November 21, 2013 | N/A |
Four women have been murdered and while the police arrest a suspect and prepare to bring him to court, Holmes and Watson work around the clock to prevent his death. This is an original story.
| 9–10 | "The Musgrave Ritual" | Andrey Kavun | Leonid Porokhin | November 25, 2013 | N/A |
Holmes's friend, Sir Reginald Musgrave, asks for help. He is scared and on the verge of a nervous breakdown due to the fact that he is 33 years old which means he needs to pass a mystical rite of passage after which he would become the full owner of the entire heritage of the Musgrave family. Reginald's father was murdered during this same ceremony. In Musgrave Castle in Northern Scotland, Holmes and Watson discover an encrypted key to the treasures of Charles I of England which according to the legend lies hidden in the castle. Loosely adapted from "The Adventure of the Musgrave Ritual" and The Hound of the Baskervilles.
| 11–12 | "Halifax" | Andrey Kavun | Leonid Porokhin | November 26, 2013 | N/A |
After Watson has published his memoirs of Sherlock Holmes, he as well as his partner become more and more famous in London. Nevertheless, Sherlock and Watson are soon facing eviction from their apartment in Baker Street. Meanwhile, a redheaded Lord who has learned about Holmes's abilities decides to ask for help. On the same day, a remarkable incident occurs at the National Bank when a man named Ebenezer Buckley comes to trade a suitcase of banknotes for pure gold. When Buckley comes out of the bank, the police suddenly appear and kill him. Holmes makes the assumption that there is a direct link between the redheaded Lord and Mr. Buckley's death, and that the happenings are only part of a bigger, cunning plan of someone who wants to undermine the economy of the British Kingdom. Loosely adapted from "The Red-Headed League".
| 13–14 | "Holmes's Last Case" | Andrey Kavun | Leonid Porokhin | November 27, 2013 | N/A |
During a Christmas party taking place in the estate of Count Brachear, the organiser is killed under unknown circumstances. Holmes and Dr. Watson are called in to deal with the case. Watson is extremely surprised when Holmes manipulates the evidence and sets Inspector Lestrade on the wrong track. During the investigation Holmes receives a message from a mysterious woman, in fact it is a call for help from Irene Adler. Ignoring Watson's warnings, Holmes goes to find and rescue Irene, even though he knows that it could be at the cost of his own life. Loosely adapted from "The Final Problem".
| 15–16 | "The Baskerville Hound" | Andrey Kavun | Leonid Porokhin | November 28, 2013 | N/A |
Three years after Holmes's death, Dr. Watson is married to Mrs Hudson and his stories about the famous detective have been successfully reissued. A small memorial museum has opened in the house on Baker Street. But life is boring without incidents and cases. So when the doctor is approached by a young girl with a request to find out the reason for the death of her lover, Watson tries to solve the case. Soon he discovers that the murder was committed after the disappearance of secret documents. Watson realises that he needs a reliable partner, and surprisingly he finds one. Despite the title of the episode, it is not an adaptation of The Hound of the Baskervilles. The episode is primarily a loose adaptation of "The Adventure of the Bruce-Partington Plans" and "The Adventure of the Empty House".

== Reception ==
Kim Newman, reviewing the series for Sherlock Holmes Mystery Magazine, described Petrenko's Holmes as looking and acting "more like a revolutionary poet than a detective." While Newman notes where the series diverges from Doyle's canon, he sums "at the end, after all the reimagining, we come back to what is for this version - as for almost all other versions - the heart of the story, the comradeship of two admirable, difficult men in a world of crime, betrayal, love, honour, diabolic cunning and basic decency."

== See also ==
- Sherlock in Russia
