= Vladimir Mashkov =

Russian actor (born 1963)

- Владимир Машков
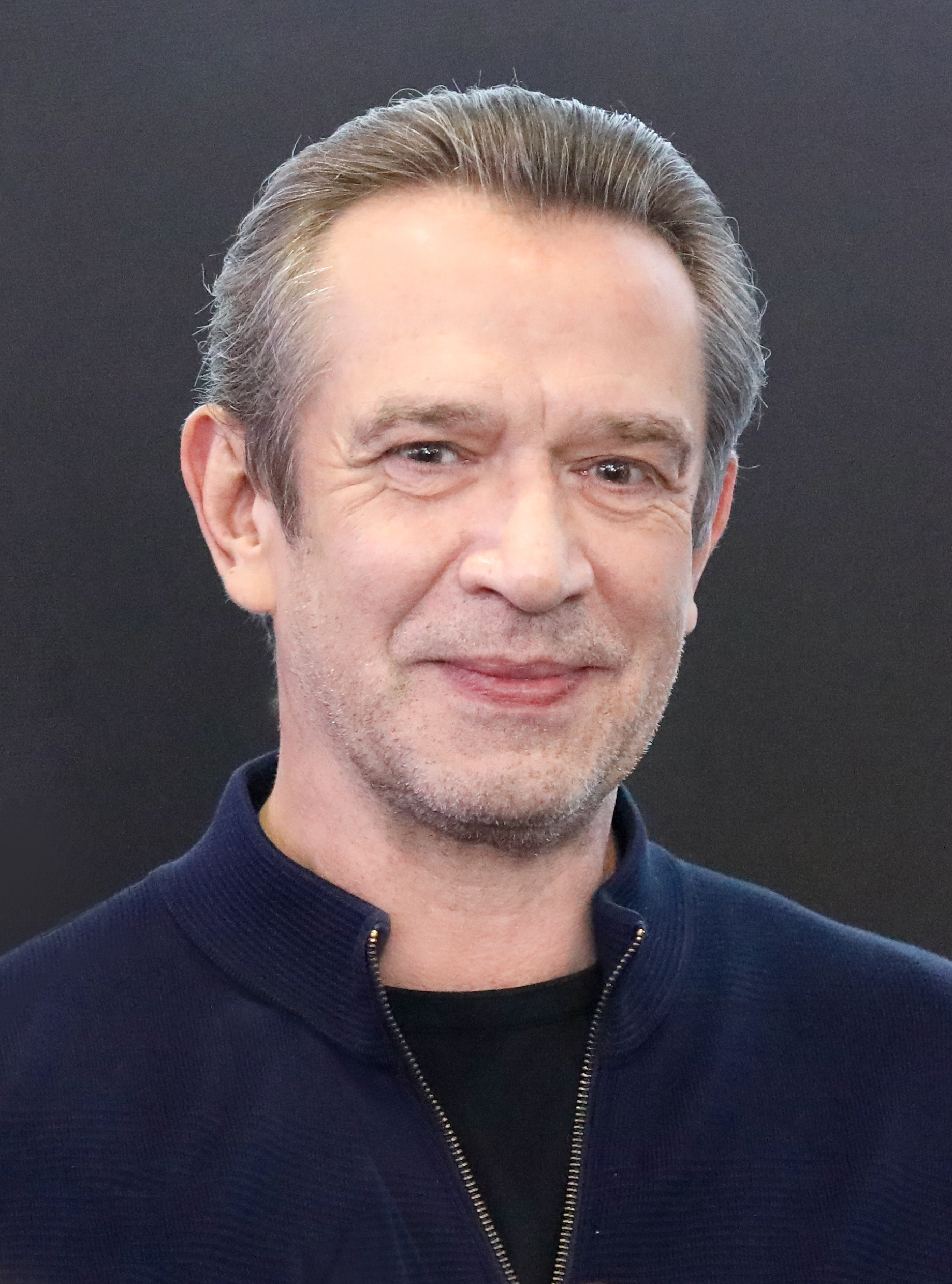
- Mashkov in 2024
- Born: Vladimir Lvovich Mashkov; 27 November 1963 (age 62); Tula, Russian SFSR, Soviet Union
- Education: Novosibirsk State Theater Institute
- Occupations: Actor; theatre director; film director; screenwriter; public figure
- Years active: 1989–present
- Awards: link= Order "For Merit to the Fatherland" link= Order of Honour (Russia) link= Honored Artist of the Russian Federation

Vladimir Lvovich Mashkov (Russian: Владимир Львович Машков; born 27 November 1963) is a Russian actor and theater director of cinema. He is known to Western audiences for his work in the 2001 film Behind Enemy Lines and the 2011 film Mission: Impossible – Ghost Protocol. Mashkov has also worked as a film director, producer and writer for the 2004 Russian film Papa.

According to his daughter Maria "Masha" Mashkova, who is close to her mother, and they both reside in the United States, her father Vladimir Mashkov is a staunch supporter of Vladimir Putin and an ardent pro-Russia, pro-Putin, pro-Kremlin propagandist who firmly supports Russia during the Russo-Ukrainian War. (Note: Vladimir Mashkov was banned from entering Latvia as of 24 March 2022 after he attended a pro-Russia, pro-Putin, pro-Kremlin ralley at Luzhniki Stadium in Moscow on 18 March 2022 during the Russian invasion of Ukraine to support the anniversary of Russia's occupation of Crimea.)

== Biography ==
=== Early life and education ===
Mashkov was born on 27 November 1963, in Tula, Russia, and raised in Novokuznetsk. His mother, Natalia (1927–1986), was a puppet theatre director, and his father, Lev Mashkov (1925–1987), was an actor.

He made his debut on stage as a child, took part in the productions of a school theater group, performed with his parents in the Novokuznetsk Puppet Theater. In the late 1970s, Mashkov entered the biological faculty of Novosibirsk State University, but studied there for only a year, after which he entered the Novosibirsk Theater School, from which in 1984 he was expelled because of improper behavior. In 1990, he graduated from the Moscow Art Theater School, studied at the course of Oleg Tabakov.

=== Career ===
In 1989–1990, he was an actor of the Moscow Art Theater named after A.P. Chekhov. Since 1990, he joined the troupe of the Oleg Tabakov Theater. He starred in the productions The Sailor's Silence (Abram Schwartz), The Inspector General (The Governor), The Myth of Don Juan (Don Juan), The Mechanical Piano (Platonov), Anecdotes (Ivanovich, Ugarov). Since 1992, Mashkov has also become one of the directors of the Tabakov Theater. He staged performances there of Star Time on Local Time (1992), Passion for Bumbarash (1992) and Death Room (1994). In the Satyricon Theater, he staged the play The Threepenny Opera (1996), in the Moscow Art Theater named after A.P. Chekhov - "No. 13" (2001).

In cinema, Mashkov made his debut in 1989 in the movie Green Goat Fire. After that came roles in the movies Do It – One! (1990), Ha-bi-Assi (1990), Casus improvisus (1991), Love on the Isle of Death (1991), Alaska, Sir! (1992) and Me Ivan, You Abraham (1993). However, in 1994, he was best known for his starring roles in Denis Yevstigneev's Limit and Valery Todorovsky's Moscow Nights films. In 1995, Mashkov also played the main role in Karen Shakhnazarov's melodrama American Daughter. One of the most notable works of this period was the role of Tolyan in the picture The Thief (1997), subsequently nominated for an Oscar. In 2000, he played the role of Emelian Pugachev in the historical film of Alexander Proshkin Russian rebellion.

In the early 2000s, Vladimir Mashkov starred in several Hollywood films: Dancing at the Blue Iguana (2000), 15 Minutes (2001), An American Rhapsody (2001) and Behind Enemy Lines (2001). Mashkov played the Russian millionaire Platon Makovsky, whose prototype was Boris Berezovsky, in Pavel Lungin's 2002 drama Tycoon. The next year, he appeared on television as merchant Rogozhin in the adaptation of Fyodor Dostoyevsky's novel The Idiot, directed by Vladimir Bortko.

In 1997, Vladimir Mashkov made his debut as a filmmaker with the New Year's romantic comedy The Orphan of Kazan. In 2004, he appeared in the role of director, screenwriter and producer of the film Daddy based on Alexander Galich's play The Sailor's Silence, in which he also starred Abram Schwartz.

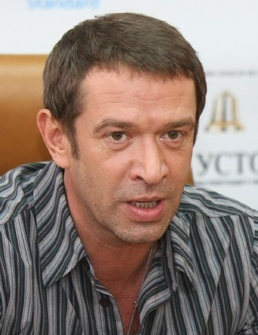
Mashkov at the Odesa International Film Festival in 2010

He starred in the 2005 adaptation of Boris Akunin's novel The State Counselor, next year he played in the action movie Piranha and the US television series Alias. In 2007, Vladimir Mashkov played detective David Gozman in the historical crime series Liquidation He portrayed the character of a hired killer in the 2008 film The Ghost. His next films were the role of the second pilot Seryoga in the action film based on real events Kandagar (2009) and the image of the machinist Ignat in Alexei Uchitel's drama The Edge (2010). In 2011, Vladimir Mashkov appeared in the American blockbuster Mission: Impossible – Ghost Protocol, where he played Russian agent Sidorov.

In 2015, the thriller TV series Rodina aired on television, directed by Pavel Lungin. Mashkov played officer Alexei Bragin, released from a long imprisonment, who appears to have defected. The disaster film Flight Crew by Nikolai Lebedev premiered in 2016, where Mashkov played experienced pilot Zinchenko. In 2017, the sports drama Going Vertical was released. In this film, Vladimir Mashkov starred in the role of coach of the Soviet basketball team, which at the 1972 Munich Olympics beat the seemingly invincible US team.

He was appointed as artistic director of the Oleg Tabakov Theatre in 2018.

=== Other activities ===
In 2011, at a festival of children's amateur doll theaters, named "Doll in Children's Hands" in Novokuznetsk, Siberia, Mashkov announced the establishment of the "Golden Lion" prize, named after Natalya Nikiforova (his mother). Prizes are given to those nominated Best Actor and Best Actress. The first award went to theater actress Galina Romanova, named an Honored Artist of Russia.

=== Politics ===
He is a member of the party United Russia, and was a delegate at the XXII Congress of the Party. He was a co-chairman of Putin's election headquarters during the 2024 presidential election.

In February 2022, he expressed support for the Russian invasion of Ukraine in an Instagram post on his official page. On 18 March 2022, Mashkov spoke at Vladimir Putin's Moscow rally commemorating the annexation of Crimea from Ukraine and supporting the Russian invasion.

In July 2022, the European Union imposed sanctions on Vladimir Mashkov in relation to the invasion. In 2024, a Ukrainian court sentenced Mashkov in absentia to ten years in prison for war propaganda and for encouraging the violation of Ukraine's territorial integrity. Authorities also confiscated his apartment in Odesa.

=== Grand Theft Auto IV ===
Mashkov claims he was in discussions with Rockstar Games to voice the character of Niko Bellic in Grand Theft Auto IV and that the character's appearance is based on him, specifically from his role of the Tracker in the 2001 movie Behind Enemy Lines, but he ultimately turned down the offer. Rockstar Games have not commented on Mashkov's claims.

== Personal life ==
Mashkov has been married four times and has one daughter, Maria, from his previous marriage to Yelena Shevchenko. In 2022, his daughter disowned him due to his support for the invasion of Ukraine. Mashkov, in turn, called his daughter a traitor.

In 2016, Forbes ranked him as one of the wealthiest Russian celebrities.

== Awards ==
- 1994 San Raphael Russian Cinema Festival: Blue Sail Award for Limita (1994)
- 1994 Sochi Open Russian Film Festival: Best Actor Award for Limita (1994)
- 1995 Geneva Film Festival: International Jury Prize for Limita (1994)
- 1995 Geneva Film Festival: Youth Jury Award for Limita (1994)
- 1997 Open CIS and Baltic Film Festival: Best Actor Award for The Thief (1997)
- 1997 Sozvezdie: Best Actor Award for The Thief (1997)
- 1998 Nika Awards: Best Actor Award for The Thief (1997)
- 2001 23rd Moscow International Film Festival: Silver St. George Best Actor Award for The Quickie (2001)
- 2004 26th Moscow International Film Festival: Audience Award for Papa (2004) (shared with Ilya Rubinstein)
- 2025 47th Moscow International Film Festival: Stanislavsky Award

== Filmography ==
=== Film ===
- Zelyonyy ogon' kozy (The Goat's Green Fire) (1989)
- Ha-bi-assy (1990)
- Do It – One! (1990)
- Lyubov na ostrove smerti (Love at the Death Island) (1991)
- Alyaska, ser! (Alaska, Sir!) (1992)
- Me Ivan, You Abraham (1993) .... Aaron
- Limita (1994) .... Ivan
- Katya Ismailova (1994) .... Sergey
- Amerikanskaya doch (American Daughter) (1995) .... Alexei
- Koroli i kapusta (Cabbages and Kings) (1996) (voice)
- Noch pered Rozhdestvom (1997) (voice) .... Devil
- The Thief (1997) ... Tolyan
- Sirota kazanskaya (Sympathy Seeker) (1997) .... Stall holder
- Sochineniye ko dnyu pobedy (Composition for Victory Day) (1998)
- Dve luny, tri solntsa (Two Moons, Three Suns) (1998) .... Alexei
- Mama (Mommy) (1999) .... Nikolai Yuryev
- Russkiy bunt (The Captain's Daughter) (2000) .... Yemelyan Pugachyov
- Dancing at the Blue Iguana (2000) .... Sacha
- 15 Minutes (2001) .... Milos Karlova
- An American Rhapsody (2001) .... Frank
- The Quickie (2001) .... Oleg
- Behind Enemy Lines (2001) .... Sasha
- Tycoon (2002) .... Platon
- Daddy (2004) .... Abraham Schwartz
- The State Counsellor (2005) .... Kozyr
- Piranha (2006) .... Mazur
- Piter FM (2006)
- The Ghost (2008) ... The Ghost (Domovoy)
- Kandahar (2010) ... Sergei
- The Edge (2010) ... Ignat
- Mission: Impossible – Ghost Protocol (2011) ... Anatoly Sidorov
- Raspoutine (2011) .... Nicholas II
- Pepel (Ashes) (2013) .... Igor Anatolievich Pietrov, former captain of the Red Army
- The Duelist (2016) .... Graf Beklemishev
- Flight Crew (2016)
- Going Vertical (2017)
- Hero (2019) .... Oleg Rodin
- Who's There? (2022) .... Pavel
- The Challenge (2023) .... Constructor Konstantin Volin
- His Name Was Not Listed (2025) .... Sergeant Major Stepan Matveyevich

=== Television ===
- Casus Improvisus (1991)
- Dvadtsat minut s angelom (1996)
- The Idiot (2003) .... Parfyon Rogozhin
- Alias (2005) .... Milo Kradic
- Liquidation (2007) .... David Markovich Gotsman
- Grigoriy R. (2014) .... Grigori Rasputin
- Rodina (2015) .... Naval Infantry colonel Alexey Bragin
- Raid (2017) .... Police officer Oleg Kaplan

=== Theatre ===
- My Big Land
- Biloxi Blues
- The Inspector General
- Don Juan

=== Director ===
==== Film ====
- Sirota kazanskaya (Sympathy Seeker) (1997)
- Papa (Daddy and Father) (2004)

==== Theatre ====
- A Star Hour By Local Time
- Passions for Bumbarash
- The Death-Defying Act
- The Threepenny Opera

=== Writer ===
- Papa (Daddy and Father) (2004)

=== Producer ===
- Papa (Daddy and Father) (2004)
