= Anders Banke =

Swedish director

Anders Banke (born 2 August 1969) is a Swedish director. He was born and raised in Ystad and developed an early interest in film. He was trained as a director at VGIK in Moscow and learned to speak Russian. There he met his friend and future collaborator Chris Maris. In 1998 he came across a horror comedy script written by Daniel Ojanlatva about a town north of the Arctic Circle being terrorized by vampires. Banke loved the idea and spent several years developing it with Ojanlatva. Since the Swedish Film Institute doesn't often approve of horror films or genre movies in general, Banke had a hard time pulling the film off. In the end, got funding from the Swedish Film Institute needed to attract other producers to the project in 2004 and production could begin. The film was Sweden's first vampire film.

The film did not hit at the box office as he thought it would, but became by far the most popular Swedish film that year, being sold to over 40 countries, which is far above the average of Swedish films. The success was especially big in Russia where it reached cult status and became the most profitable independent film of that year in Russia. The success led to Banke being offered the job of directing a remake of the Hong Kong film Breaking News, Gorjacije novosti or Newsmakers.

Anders Banke will direct a new Swedish horror comedy written by Daniel Ojanlatva called Ond Bråd Sommar. According to the writer of the movie the film will be filmed in 2012 or 2013.

Banke will direct a 16-part black comedy-horror TV-series called Chernobyl for Russian National TV channel TNT. Shooting starts summer 2012.

== Works ==
- Frostbite (2006)
- Newsmakers (2009)
- Chernobyl: Zone of Exclusion (2014)
- Warg (2016)
- Enemy Lines (2020)
