= Sympathy Seeker =

- Russian: Сирота казанская
- Directed by: Vladimir Mashkov
- Written by: Oleg Antonov
- Produced by: Evgeniy Golynskiy; Sergey Kozlov; Igor Tolstunov
- Starring: Yelena Shevchenko; Nikolay Fomenko; Valentin Gaft; Lev Durov; Oleg Tabakov
- Cinematography: Nikolay Nemolyaev
- Music by: Sergey Bondarenko
- Release date: 1997
- Country: Russia
- Language: Russian

Sympathy Seeker (Russian: Сирота казанская) is a 1997 Russian romantic comedy film directed by Vladimir Mashkov.

== Plot ==
Rural schoolteacher Nastya decides to search for the father she has never met, knowing only his first name, Pavel, and that he once met her mother at a Black Sea resort called the "Sunny" guesthouse. After publishing an unmailed letter from her mother in the newspaper, Nastya receives responses from three men who all believe they could be her father: a retired circus magician, a former astronaut, and a retired ship’s cook. All three arrive on New Year's Eve, each sharing stories of a summer romance with a wonderful woman named Galina. Tensions rise as they compete for Nastya’s paternity, prompting her fiancé, Kolya, to suggest showing them a photo of her mother. Fond of each man, Nastya pretends the photo is unavailable to spare their feelings, but Kolya doesn’t catch on and heads off on his tractor. Realizing her intentions en route, he returns with a large uprooted fir tree, accusing the men of selfish motives. Angered by Kolya’s accusations, Nastya sends him off to replant the tree, while the three men decide to set aside their rivalry and work together to prepare for the holiday celebration.

As the evening unfolds, Pavel the magician decorates the tree, Pavel the astronaut fixes the TV and builds a makeshift satellite dish, and Pavel the cook prepares a lavish New Year’s feast. When Kolya returns nearly frostbitten, they all help him warm up, and the group celebrates the New Year together. They dance, test their shared "genes" in quirky ways, and discover that Nastya is pregnant, imagining an adventure through space as a family. Later that night, the three men dream of fishing together under the fir tree, caring for Nastya’s future son, Pavlik. However, the next morning, they each come across Nastya’s family album and realize that, in their youth, they had each known a different "Galya". Heartbroken, they quietly leave, only to be stopped when Kolya blocks the train with his tractor. Realizing how much she values their newfound bond, Nastya invites them back into her life, grateful for their love and support as family, even if not by blood.

== Cast ==
- Yelena Shevchenko as Nastya
- Nikolay Fomenko as Kolya
- Valentin Gaft as Magician
- Lev Durov as Cosmonaut
- Oleg Tabakov as Cook
- Mikhail Filipchuk as Demendeyev (as Misha Filipchuk)
- Viktor Pavlov
- Fyodor Valikov as Watchman
- Lyudmila Davydova as Saleswoman
- Tatyana Rogozina as Attendant
- Vladimir Mashkov as Fyodor
