= Great Is My Country =

- Широка страна моя родная
- Directed by: Roman Karmen
- Music by: Kirill Molchanov
- Release date: 1958
- Running time: 90 minutes
- Country: USSR

Vast is my Native Land (1958), also known as Great Is My Country (Russian: Широка страна моя родная, romanized: Shiroka strana moya rodnaya) was the first film shot in the Soviet wide-screen film format known as Kinopanorama. The title was taken from the song of the same name by the Russian composer Isaac Dunaevsky, which is featured in the film. The film was directed by Roman Karmen, known for various documentary films produced in the Soviet Union. The music was composed by Kirill Molchanov, a noted composer of music for ballet and opera.

The Sovcolor film, which is 90-minutes in length, was premièred on 28 February 1958 at the Mir Kino Theatre in Moscow. The film was screened throughout the USSR. An edited version of the film was screened In June and July, 1958, at the Mayfair Theatre in New York City in conjunction with Soviet Trade Exhibition at the New York Coliseum.
