= The Cadets (TV series) =

Russian television series

The Cadets (Russian: Курсанты, romanized: Kursanty) is a 2004 Russian TV series about a class of Soviet artillery officer cadets going through training prior to their commissioning and entry into the Battle of Stalingrad during World War II (The Great Patriotic War). The ten part series are based on the memoirs of Pyotr Todorovsky and directed by Andrei Kavun.

The US DVD release of the series was done as two volumes with two discs in each volume.
