= Breaking News (2004 film) =

2004 Hong Kong film by Johnnie To

- Film poster

Chinese name
- Traditional Chinese: 大事件
- Simplified Chinese: 大事件
Transcriptions
Standard Mandarin
- Hanyu Pinyin: Dà Shì Jiàn
Yue: Cantonese
- Jyutping: Daai6 Si6 Gin2
- Directed by: Johnnie To
- Written by: Chan Hing-kai; Yip Tin-shing; Milkyway Creative Team
- Produced by: Johnnie To; Cao Biao
- Starring: Richie Jen; Kelly Chen; Nick Cheung
- Cinematography: Cheng Siu-keung
- Edited by: David Richardson
- Music by: Ben Cheung; Chung Chi-wing
- Production companies: Media Asia Films; China Film Group; Milkyway Image
- Distributed by: Media Asia Distribution
- Release date: 10 June 2004
- Running time: 90 minutes
- Country: Hong Kong
- Languages: Cantonese; Mandarin; English
- Box office: US$1,028,420

Breaking News (Chinese: 大事件) is a 2004 Hong Kong action film produced and directed by Johnnie To, and starring Richie Jen, Kelly Chen, and Nick Cheung. The film premiered out of competition at the 2004 Cannes Film Festival.

== Plot ==
The Hong Kong Police finds itself in a public relations crisis after a disastrous shootout and the scene of a police officer surrendering in apparent fear to the mobsters was captured and telecast by the local media. Inspector Cheung and his crew are assigned to the task of catching these mobsters, led by the intelligent and resourceful Yuan.

In the meantime, Superintendent Rebecca Fong leads an effort on the part of the Hong Kong Police to mislead the media and salvage the reputation of the police team. She sees the chance in a raid on the mobsters hiding out in an apartment, while Inspector Cheung leads his own team to search for the mobsters, with many gunfights breaking out in between.

At the same time, a group of hired killers led by a man named Chun are also hiding out in the same building. The hired killers mistake the police raid as something meant for them instead of Yuan and his group. Both Chun's group and Yuan's group split up in pairs amidst the chaos of the raid. Yuan and his partner Chung hide out in an apartment and accidentally rescue Chun and his companion. Yuan and Fong use the media to wage a propaganda war.

Yuan and Chun finally decide to create chaos. They escape from the apartment after using the remaining residents of the apartment as hostages and creating a diversion. Both groups unite and have a gunfight with the police, fatally killing most of the united group except for Yuan and Chun. The pair escape through a secret tunnel under the elevator but Cheung and Fong see through their trick and are able to catch up to Yuan. Yuan takes Fong as a hostage and goes to the place where Chun was supposed to assassinate his target, acting in Chun's place. But the assassination is made impossible as Cheung and other police officers follow Fong's tracker and rush to the scene. Fong says that she would not let this "show" be messed up in her hands. Yuan knows that the defeat is inevitable, so he decides to expose himself and is shot dead by the police. The police promotes Cheung and Fong as the heroes of this "show".

At the end of the story, the killer Chun takes Yuan's place in hijacking the cash withdrawal vehicle and is also shot dead.

== Cast ==
- Richie Jen as Yuen, an intelligent criminal
- Kelly Chen as Superintendent Rebecca Fong
- Nick Cheung as Senior Inspector Cheung of District Crime Squad
- Eddie Cheung as Chief Superintendent Eric Yeung
- Benz Hui as Sergeant Hoi, subordinate of Inspector Cheung
- Lam Suet as Yip, hostage
- You Yong as Chun
- Ding Haifeng as Lung
- Li Haitao as Chung
- Simon Yam as Asst. Commissioner Wong (special appearance)
- Alan Chui Chung-San as Chun's target
- Maggie Shiu as Inspector Grace Chow, Police Public Relation (special appearance)
- Wong Chi-wai as Wang
- Wong Wah-wo as White Hair

== Awards and nominations ==
Awards and nominations
Ceremony	Category	Recipient	Outcome
24th Hong Kong Film Awards	Best Film	Breaking News	Nominated
24th Hong Kong Film Awards	Best Director	Johnnie To	Nominated
24th Hong Kong Film Awards	Best Supporting Actress	Maggie Shiu	Nominated
24th Hong Kong Film Awards	Best Film Editing	David M. Richardson	Nominated
41st Golden Horse Awards	Best Feature Film	Breaking News	Nominated
41st Golden Horse Awards	Best Director	Johnnie To	Won
41st Golden Horse Awards	Best Film Editing	David M. Richardson	Won
41st Golden Horse Awards	Best Action Choreography	Yuen Bun	Nominated
41st Golden Horse Awards	Best Visual Effects	Stephen Ma	Nominated
41st Golden Horse Awards	Best Art Direction	Yee Chung-Man	Nominated
11th Hong Kong Film Critics Society Awards	Film of Merit	Breaking News	Won
10th Golden Bauhinia Awards	Top Ten Chinese-language Film	Breaking News	Won
7th Changchun Film Festival	Best Actress	Kelly Chen	Nominated
34th Sitges Film Festival	Best Director	Johnnie To	Won

== Remakes ==
A remake called Goryachie Novosti (international title: Newsmakers) has been shot in Russia. It is produced by Moscow-based Tandem Pictures and Gothenburg's Illusion Film and helmed by young Swedish director Anders Banke. The Russian/Swedish version of Breaking News was theatrically released in Russia and ex-USSR on 7 May 2009.

== See also ==
- List of Hong Kong films
- Johnnie To filmography
