= Hooked on the Game =

2009 Russian action film

- Directed by: Pavel Sanayev
- Written by: Pavel Sanayev; Aleksandr Chubaryan
- Produced by: Aleksandr Bondarev
- Starring: Sergei Chirkov; Marina Petrenko; Pavel Priluchny
- Cinematography: Vladislav Gurchin
- Music by: Ivan Burlyaev; Sergei Dudakov
- Production companies: Russian Film Studio "IVAN", STS
- Release date: November 26, 2009
- Running time: 97 minutes
- Country: Russia
- Language: Russian
- Budget: $3 500 000
- Box office: $3 742 376

Hooked on the Game (Russian: На игре, romanized: Na igre) is a 2009 Russian action film directed by Pavel Sanayev, it is an adaptation of the science-fiction comic book about to video gamers. It is based on Alexander Chubaryan's novel Games into Life.

The working title of the film was Gamers. In Search of a Goal, but it was changed to Hooked on the Game, due to the release of the movie Gamer starring Gerard Butler. In April 2010, the sequel Hooked on the Game: A New Level was released.

In the spring of 2012, STS hosted the premiere of the 8-episode television series Gamers, a continuation of the films Hooked on the Game and Hooked on the Game: A New Level.

== Plot ==
The film begins with a scene in the house of gangster authorities, Matvey and his friends. To them comes the young boy Vampire who states that he killed their guard and needs to talk with them.

The action is transferred to the month before. The city hosts a cybersports tournament, and the Grandmasters team (Vampire, Doc, Komar, Tall and Jan) wins this tournament. Vampire's girl, Rita (Marina Petrenko), takes the second place in auto racing. Additionally, Vampire's friend, Maxim, wins in a fighting game. Victor Pokrovsky, the president of the company "VIRTUS", gives the guys the first samples of the newest disks, which turn out to be experimental models of scientific development.

After starting the discs, the guys get the abilities associated with their gaming hobbies - the members of the Grandmasters team start to handle weapons with incredible skill, Rita becomes a professional driver, Max gets martial arts skills.

Maxim and his girlfriend Lena drink coffee in a restaurant, where a fight begins with Vazha's crew, Khizir's brother a criminal authority. Maxim with the help of acquired abilities defeats the attackers with surprising ease. Later, Maxim is seized by Vazha's people and taken to the factory of Khizir. Wanting to save their friend, the company of shooters led by Vampire breaks into the base and with the help of captured weapons destroys all of Khizir's fighters, as well as Khizir himself. They free Maxim and hide weapons at the dacha of Tall. Maxim responds with a categorical refusal on the offer to join the team.

A month passes. Doku does not have enough money, and he offers Vampire to "bet out" a criminal syndicate led by Matvey. The plan fails, and the guys have to kill the bandits. But at this time Rita is kidnapped by the FSB colonel Lebedev, in combination - the right hand of the oligarch Boris Sergeevich Gromov. Lebedev, through blackmail, forces the guys to work for special services and eliminate bandits.

In the first days, the guys feel all the buzz of a rich life, but when they perform the task of liquidating Sergei Zaritsyn, a businessman who makes the biggest deal with the Bolivian government, Vampire realizes that they work not for special services, but for criminals. He tries to convince Doc not to kill Zaritsyn, but Doc deceives Vampire and successfully completes the operation. At the escape from the battlefield, Rita and Tall are seriously wounded, but thanks to Vampire, everyone manages to leave. Upon arrival at Lebedev's base, Tall dies from blood loss.

== Cast ==
- Sergei Chirkov — Dmitry "Vampire" Orlov
- Marina Petrenko — Margarita "Rita" Smirnova
- Pavel Priluchny — Ruslan "Doctor" Avdeev
- Evgeny Kharlanov — Kirill "Komar" Komarenko
- Tikhon Zhiznevsky — Konstantin Tall
- Nodar Syradze — Jan Zac
- Aleksey Bardukov — Maxim
- Agnia Ditkovskyte — Lena
- Viktor Verzhbitsky — Boris Sergeevich Gromov
- Boris Tenin — Colonel Lebedev
- Igor Sklyar — Sergey Zaritsyn
- Mikhail Gorevoy — Victor Pokrovsky
- Mikhail Trukhin — Oleg Skolsky
- Sergey Burunov — Boris

== Production ==
The film was shot in Nizhny Novgorod. Most of the stunts were performed by the actors themselves.
