= Skipped Parts (2010 film) =

- Directed by: Andrey Kavun
- Written by: Oleg Malovichko
- Produced by: Valery Todorovsky; Vadim Goryainov; Leonid Lebedev
- Starring: Dmitry Kubasov; Pavel Priluchny; Lyanka Gryu; Anna Starshenbaum
- Cinematography: Serhiy Mykhalchuk
- Edited by: Alexey Bobrov
- Music by: Andrey Feofanov
- Production companies: Green Light Studio; Red Arrow
- Release date: 16 September 2010
- Running time: 89 min.
- Country: Russia
- Language: Russian

Skipped Parts (Russian: Детям до 16…, romanized: Detyam do 16..., lit. 'Children of 16') is a film in the genre of melodrama, which premiered on September 16, 2010. It is the third feature film directed by Andrey Kavun after the Piranha and Kandagar.

== Plot ==
School friends Maksim, Kiril, Dasha and Leya face the changes that come with adulthood. As they begin to experience love and sex, mistakes and disappointments, betrayal and self-sacrifice, they learn to build relationships and discover something new and not always pleasant in themselves.

== Cast ==
- Dmitry Kubasov as Kiril
- Pavel Priluchny as Maksim
- Lyanka Gryu as Darya
- Anna Starshenbaum as Leya
- Oleksiy Gorbunov as passenger

== Awards and nominations ==
- Russian Guild of Film Critics: Best Actress (Anna Starshenbaum) — nom
- Odesa International Film Festival: Best Film; People's Choice Award — win
- Window to Europe: Best Actress (Anna Starshenbaum) — win
