= Vladimir Sharpatov =

Russian airplane pilot

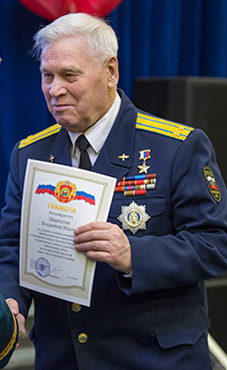
Sharpatov in 2016

Vladimir Ilyich Sharpatov (Russian: Влади́мир Ильи́ч Шарпа́тов, born March 21, 1940, Krasnogorkiy village of Zvenigovsky District, Mari El) is a civil aviation pilot and Hero of the Russian Federation (1996). An Ilyushin Il-76 cargo plane under his command made a forced landing at the airfield near Kandahar, Afghanistan, in August 1995. All seven Russian nationals on board were subsequently held captive by the Taliban for a year until they successfully escaped by flying their own plane out of Afghanistan in August 1996. Russian actor Alexander Baluyev played Vladimir Sharpatov in the 2010 film Kandagar.

== Biography ==
Sharpatov took evening classes at the Kazan Aviation Institute, and attended a local flying club, where he became a glider pilot. He then entered the Krasny Kut civil aviation flight school. In 1965, he graduated from flight school and was assigned to Tyumen, where he worked for several years. In 1971 Sharpatov entered the Saint Petersburg State University of Civil Aviation and upon graduation received the specialty of a pilot engineer. Since 1995, he worked as an instructor pilot for the Il-76 aircraft of the Aerostan airline in Kazan.

== See also ==
- List of Heroes of the Russian Federation
