= I.S.S. (film) =

2023 film by Gabriela Cowperthwaite

- Theatrical release poster
- Directed by: Gabriela Cowperthwaite
- Written by: Nick Shafir
- Produced by: Mickey Liddell; Pete Shilaimon
- Starring: Ariana DeBose; Chris Messina; John Gallagher Jr.; Masha Mashkova; Costa Ronin; Pilou Asbæk
- Cinematography: Nick Remy Matthews
- Edited by: Colin Patton; Richard Mettler
- Music by: Anne Nikitin
- Production company: Liddell Entertainment
- Distributed by: Bleecker Street
- Release dates: June 12, 2023 (Tribeca); January 19, 2024 (United States)
- Running time: 96 minutes
- Country: United States
- Language: English
- Budget: $13.8 million
- Box office: $6.6 million

I.S.S. is a 2023 American science fiction thriller film directed by Gabriela Cowperthwaite and written by Nick Shafir. The film stars Ariana DeBose, Chris Messina, John Gallagher Jr., Masha Mashkova, Costa Ronin, and Pilou Asbæk. It follows two groups aboard the International Space Station—one of American astronauts and the other of Russian cosmonauts—who fight each other for the control of the station after a war starts between their countries.

I.S.S. premiered at the 2023 Tribeca Film Festival, and was theatrically released in the United States on January 19, 2024, by Bleecker Street. It received mixed reviews from critics and grossed $6.6 million.

== Plot ==
NASA astronauts Kira Foster and Christian Campbell arrive at the International Space Station (ISS) and greet their colleagues, American Commander Gordon Barrett and Russian cosmonauts Weronika Vetrov and brothers, Nicholai and Alexey Pulov. Despite the cultural and political differences, they get along well, with the Russian and American men considering each other as brothers, and Gordon and Weronika having formed a romance. Kira views Earth from the space station for the first time with her coworkers, who explain the overview effect to her.

Later, she witnesses numerous nuclear explosions across the continental United States. Communications with the ground fail, but Gordon receives a coded message from the U.S. government indicating that the Russian military has initiated a nuclear attack on the U.S., and ordering him to take control of the ISS, "...by any means necessary." He discusses the message with Kira and Christian, and they suspect the Russians were given a similar order. They also find the station is orbiting too low and will fall to the Earth if aid does not arrive within 24 hours.

Nicholai tells the crew that a communications antenna is broken, requiring Gordon to go outside to fix it. While outside, Gordon tells Kira to keep the others away from the windows to spare them from the sight of Earth's surface in flames. Gordon untethers his space suit to reach the antenna, which he finds to be just fine. Alexey sabotages Gordon's communications with the ISS while Nicholai uses the station's robotic arm to swat him into space.

Enraged by the attack on Gordon, Weronika asks Kira, the only one she trusts, to depart in the Soyuz spacecraft with Alexey's research, a cure for radiation sickness. Weronika explains that whichever government obtains it will determine who survives the nuclear war. Weronika creates a distraction by threatening Alexey and Nicholai with destroying the station. Kira searches the Russian lockers for the research, asking for Christian's help locating "node zero". He says it does not exist, leading Kira to conclude Weronika lied. Kira and Christian find the cosmonauts in a tense standoff which ends with Christian striking Weronika in the back of the head, killing her.

The astronauts withdraw. Alexey refuses to kill the Americans, so Nicholai hunts for them alone while Kira and Christian hide. Alexey sees Gordon hanging onto a solar panel and uses the robotic arm to rescue him, then helps Kira evade Nicholai. A distraught Gordon becomes further agitated when he learns of Weronika's death, arming himself. Nicholai finds them but is tackled by Gordon, who locks them in another module where they fight. The others frantically work to open the hatch, but Gordon and Nicholai have already killed each other.

After the incident, Kira notices "NODE0" written over the door to the Japanese Experiment Module. She goes to confront Christian, and finds a Soyuz spacesuit and the Russian research in his sleep pod. Meanwhile, Christian quietly sabotages the station's life support system. Kira finds Christian and Alexey in the galley, and the Americans guardedly talk about the situation, then attempt to influence Alexey to take sides. When Christian senses Kira may not be on his side after all, he lunges at her with a kitchen knife, but Alexey jumps in the way, and the knife pierces Alexey's hand. Kira and Alexey work together to strangle Christian, killing him.

Kira treats Alexey's wound and Alexey restores life support. Communications are restored, allowing the station to stabilize. Both governments, sending several messages, request confirmation that the astronauts and cosmonauts have completed their respective missions to take control of the station. Kira and Alexey do not see the messages, having already boarded the Soyuz spacecraft with the research notes. As they descend toward Earth, Alexey asks where they are going, and Kira responds, "I don't know."

== Cast ==
- Ariana DeBose as Dr. Kira Foster, an American astronaut
- Chris Messina as Gordon Barrett, an American astronaut
- John Gallagher Jr. as Christian Campbell, an American astronaut
- Masha Mashkova as Weronika Vetrov, a Russian cosmonaut
- Costa Ronin as Nicholai Pulov, a Russian cosmonaut
- Pilou Asbæk as Alexey Pulov, a Russian cosmonaut

== Production ==
In December 2020, Nick Shafir's screenplay I.S.S. was included on that year's "Black List" of most-liked unproduced screenplays. In January 2021, it was announced that the film had been greenlit for production by LD Entertainment with Gabriela Cowperthwaite directing. Chris Messina and Pilou Asbæk were reported to star in the film. In February, it was reported that Ariana DeBose had also joined the cast. She auditioned prior to winning an Oscar for West Side Story. Cowperthwaite was impressed by the understated and nuanced approach DeBose took to the role. DeBose's background as a dancer helped with portraying the character in zero gravity.

Masha Mashkova was cast as Weronika after the original actress for the role dropped out upon getting sick and suggested Mashkova for the part. Costa Ronin was cast because Cowperthwaite had been impressed by his performance on The Americans. He improvised his line about the trees in Russia.

I.S.S. began filming at Screen Gems Studios in Wilmington, North Carolina, in February 2021. The set was designed to resemble the actual International Space Station. Cowperthwaite described it as "surreal" when Russia invaded Ukraine while the film was in post-production. She did not consider I.S.S. to be "a political movie" but did intend for it to show how "the brunt" of geopolitical conflicts "falls on the little people."

In the original script, Dr. Kira Foster was researching microbes instead of mice. Scott Kelly's memoir Endurance: A Year in Space, a Lifetime of Discovery was used as research for the film and inspired how the mice react to zero gravity.

Cowperthwaite said of the film, "I come from these earnest documentaries and dramas and stuff like that, but I love a fun ride. I’m a popcorn-chomping moviegoer...And so being able to be entrusted, with that world, that genre, whilst maybe bringing some of that humanity that I feel is more my tool set into it felt like a very fun challenge."

== Release ==
The world premiere of I.S.S. was held at the Tribeca Film Festival on June 12, 2023. In August 2023, Bleecker Street acquired the United States distribution rights. Theatrical release of the film in North America was on January 19, 2024. It was released in the United Kingdom on 26 April 2024.

The film premiered on Paramount+ with Showtime on June 3, 2024.

== Reception ==
=== Box office ===
When released in North America, the film made $1.2 million from 2,520 theaters on its first day and went on to gross $3 million from its opening weekend, finishing seventh at the box office.

=== Critical response ===
On the review aggregator website Rotten Tomatoes, 61% of 169 critics' reviews are positive, with an average rating of 6.0/10. The website's consensus reads: "Elevated by an appealing cast, I.S.S. wrings effective albeit familiar thrills out of character-driven drama in a claustrophobic setting." Metacritic, which uses a weighted average, assigned the film a score of 53 out of 100, based on 36 critics, indicating "mixed or average" reviews. Audiences polled by CinemaScore gave the film an average grade of "C−" on an A+ to F scale, while those polled by PostTrak gave it an 49% overall positive score, with 27% saying they would definitely recommend the film.

Reviewing the film for his Kermode and Mayo's Take channel on YouTube, Mark Kermode's summary critique was "It doesn't come up with much more than its central theme, but it's an enjoyable B movie in that it's a simple set up, it's convincingly played and directed with enough panache."

Derek Sante of KSNV wrote in his generally positive review: "This is an interesting thriller, though it has some plot problems. But it's entertaining enough, so I'll give it a B−."

Reviewing the film for The Observer, Wendy Ide gave it a 3/5 score and wrote, "While DeBose is impressive, the contrived plot of Gabriela Cowperthwaite’s movie hinges, somewhat preposterously, on rational, highly trained scientific minds devolving overnight into paranoid, murderous maniacs." Tim Robey of The Daily Telegraph was more critical in his review: "With a modest budget of $14m applied to a concept bursting with potential, the film bides its time sensibly enough, but then screws up every remaining phase of its mission."
