= The Unknown War (TV series) =

- Screenplay by: John Lord
- Directed by: Isaac Kleinerman, Roman Karmen
- Narrated by: Burt Lancaster
- Countries of origin: Soviet Union; United Kingdom; United States
- No. of episodes: 20

Production
- Producer: Fred Weiner
- Running time: 1040 min

Original release
- Release: 1 January – 22 June 1978

The Unknown War (Russian: "Великая Отечественная" (The Great Patriotic War) or "Неизвестная война" (The Unknown War) is an American documentary television series. The 20-part series documents the World War II conflict between Nazi Germany and the Soviet Union. The show was produced and syndicated for international distribution by Air Time International, and the executive producer was Fred Weiner. Each episode is about 48 minutes long, similar in format to The World at War documentary series. The footage was edited from over 3.5 million feet of film taken by Soviet camera crews from the first day of the war during Operation Barbarossa on 22 June 1941 through the Soviet invasion of Manchuria in August 1945. Most of these films have never been seen outside this documentary series.

The series is hosted by Academy Award winner Burt Lancaster, who spent three weeks in eight cities in the USSR for location filming. Film footage from Soviet archives comprises a major portion of the series, supplemented by film from both the United States and British archives. Appearing in exclusive interviews would be Russian Commanders like Georgi Zhukov and Vasily Chuikov. Other interviews shot for the series included Soviet general secretary Leonid Brezhnev and Averell Harriman, who was U.S. Ambassador to the Soviet Union during World War II.

The series was produced with Soviet cooperation after the release of The World at War. Fred Weiner believed that a TV series featuring never before seen footage of the battles on the Eastern front would be of great interest to viewers and worldwide TV stations. Released in 1978, The Unknown War promoted the scope of the Soviet participation against Nazi Germany. The program was purchased first by German TV and quickly thereafter by TV stations in New York and Boston. Eventually the program was purchased by approximately 75 American TV stations and over 50 foreign broadcasters. After the Soviet Union's invasion of Afghanistan in 1979, several American TV stations, responding to public outcry, temporarily halted airings. Later it returned to additional airings on cable, including A&E, the History Channel, and Hulu. The series was released on a 5-disc DVD set in 2011.

The documentary series was banned in Malaysia in August 1979 after a few episodes.

== Episodes ==
1. June 22, 1941
2. The Battle for Moscow
3. The Siege of Leningrad
4. To the East
5. The Defense of Stalingrad
6. Survival at Stalingrad
7. The World's Greatest Tank Battle
8. War in the Arctic
9. War in the Air
10. The Partisans
11. The Battle of the Seas
12. The Battle of Caucasus
13. The Liberation of Ukraine
14. The Liberation of Belorussia
15. The Balkans to Vienna
16. The Liberation of Poland
17. The Allies
18. The Battle of Berlin
19. The Last Battle of the Unknown War
20. A Soldier of the Unknown War

== Soundtrack ==
The series has a recurrent theme song " Toward the Unknown " written by Rod McKuen and "Birch-tree's dreams" ("Берёзовые сны") by G. Fere (Г. Фере) and V. Geviksman (В. Гевиксман).

== See also ==
- Alexandrov Ensemble soloists (song by Geviksman and Fere)
