= A Little Princess (1997 film) =

- Directed by: Vladimir Grammatikov
- Written by: Galina Arbuzova; Vladimir Zheleznikov
- Based on: A Little Princess by Frances Hodgson Burnett
- Produced by: Mikhail Litvak; Mikhail Zilberman
- Starring: Anastasia Meskova; Alla Demidova; Igor Yasulovich; Yegor Grammatikov; Lyanka Gryu
- Narrated by: Aleksey Batalov
- Cinematography: Aleksandr Antipenko
- Music by: Vladimir Davydenko
- Production company: Globe Film Studio
- Release date: 1997
- Running time: 88 minutes
- Country: Russia
- Language: Russian

A Little Princess (Russian: Маленькая принцесса, romanized: Malenkaya printsessa) is a 1997 Russian family drama film directed by Vladimir Grammatikov. It is based on the novel A Little Princess by Frances Hodgson Burnett.

== Synopsis ==
As the film opens in 1914 London, thick fog engulfs a London cab that drives through the city carrying Captain Crewe and his young daughter, Sarah. Captain Crewe has just returned from India. Sarah is unlike other children; she always thinks about things that are unusual.

Sarah's mother died when she was a baby, and her father has been called away for service. Sarah is left to be raised in a boarding house for noble maidens run by Miss Minchin, a cruel, selfish, and heartless woman.

On Sarah's birthday, news arrives from India that her father, Captain Crewe, has died. With the loss of her father, her status at the boarding house drops dramatically. She had previously been the best student and lived in a luxury apartment, but now she is sent to reside in the attic. She is forced to be a lowly maid alongside Becky, who soon becomes her confidant.

Unbeknownst to Sarah, Mr. Carissford has just arrived in London from India. He was a close friend and colleague of Sarah's father when they worked together in the diamond business. Mr. Carissford and his servant, Ram Dass, painstakingly sweep London in search of Sarah.

When they finally find her, they rescue her from the boarding house and inform Sarah that she has inherited her father's riches. Now, as part owner of her Father's powerful diamond business, Sarah returns to her prior status as a lady of great wealth.

With the holiday season approaching, Sarah invites everyone to a Christmas party. Miss Minchin tries to dissuade her sister, Amelia, and her pupils from going but they do not listen. In the end, even Minchin's favorite dog, tired of Miss Minchin's evil nature, runs off to the celebration.

== Cast ==
- Anastasia Meskova as Sara Crewe
- Alla Demidova as Miss Maria Minchin
- Igor Yasulovich as Carrisford, Captain Crewe's business partner
- Yegor Grammatikov as Captain Crewe, Sarah's father.
- Anna Terekhova as Miss Amelia Minchin, Maria Minchin's younger sister.
- Lyanka Gryu as Becky, Sara's best friend
- Tatyana Aksyuta as Miss Brown, bakerwoman
- Yekaterina Mikhaylovskaya as Ermengarde
- Sofia Timchenko as Lottie Legh
- Masha Mashkova as Lavinia Herbert
- Olesya Tretyakova as Annie, miss Brown's assistant
- Anna Dyakina as Jesse
- Victor Yanykov as Barrow, lawyer
- Ekaterina Morozova as Mariette, teacher
- Stepan Demeter as Ram Dass, Indian assistant of Mr. Carrisford
- Vladimir Grammatikov as an antiquarian
- Alexey Batalov as narrator (voice)

== Awards and nominations ==
=== Awards ===
- XVII Moscow International Film Festival for Children — Grand Gold Medal (Anastasia Meskova)
- Nika Award — Best Cinematographer (Aleksandr Antipenko)

=== Nominations ===
- Nika Award — Best Actress (Alla Demidova), Best Production Designer (Konstantin Zagorsky), Best Costume Designer (Regina Khomskaya)
- Kinotavr — Grand Prize
