= I, a Russian soldier =

- Directed by: Andrey Malyukov
- Written by: Elena Raiskaya
- Produced by: Leonid Sorochan; Andrey Malyukov
- Starring: Dmitry Medvedev; Milena Tskhovreba-Agranovich; Aleksey Buldakov
- Cinematography: Alexander Ryabov
- Edited by: Maria Sergeeva
- Music by: Eduard Artemyev
- Distributed by: Renaissance; Roskomkino
- Release date: 1995
- Running time: 100 minutes
- Country: Russia
- Language: Russian

I, a Russian soldier (Russian: Я — русский солдат, romanized: Ya, Russkiy soldat) is a 1995 Russian war film about a famous episode of the Eastern Front, the Defense of Brest Fortress, it is based on the novel His Name Was Not Listed by Boris Vasilyev.

== Plot ==
The film begins on June 21, 1941, one day before the German invasion. Lieutenant Nikolay Pluzhnikov, a former cadet in the border guards school, is posted at the border in Brest. Lieutenant Nikolay Pluzhnikov tours the city with another traveler, a Jewish woman named Mirra, who serves as a cook in the officer's canteen. She offers to lead him to his new service place, the Brest Fortress.

The next morning, the garrison at Brest comes under fierce attack by an invading Wehrmacht force. He, Mirra, and a group of soldiers under his command begin defending the Brest Fortress, in spite of extremely unequal odds.

The garrison makes several attempts to break out, but lack the numbers to do so. With the Soviet front collapsing, no reinforcements arrive as hoped. The defenders of the fortress are severely outgunned and outnumbered. Although the small, inexperienced force of Soviet soldiers in the opening hours of the battle were stunned by the surprise attack, running short of supplies, and cut off from the outside help, many of them held out much longer than the Germans expected. The Germans are forced to engage in vicious hand-to-hand fighting with the Soviet defenders. The defenders are slowly pushed back, with the Germans capturing key portions of the fort, including the headquarters.

Pluzhnikov and his men receive an order to reoccupy and secure the headquarters. A freshly-graduated cadet armed with only a TT pistol, Pluzhnikov, with several men assisting him, managed to successfully reoccupy the headquarters and eliminate one of the German machine-gun nests.

In spite of the valiant defense, the outnumbered Soviet soldiers are killed or mortally wounded one by one. Border guards, soldiers, and civilians who joined the defense are killed. His friend, Private Salnikov, saves Pluzhnikov from certain death, but loses his own life.

When the invaders bombard the fortress with artillery, Pluzhnikov takes cover in the basement where Mirra and three soldiers (starshina Stephan Matveevich, junior sergeant Fedorchuk and private Vasyliy Volkov) are waiting for the fighting to end. The group has hoarded a stockpile of food, ammunition and even water inside the basement. Pluzhnikov harshly condemns them for inaction and makes them come along for a recon mission. When the Germans spot them, they open fire, and Matveevich is severely wounded. Fedorchuk wants to give up and puts his hands up to surrender. Pluzhnikov catches him and shoots him as a traitor. Young private Volkov sees Pluzhnikov's cruelty and decides to flee during the night. Mirra and Stephan Matveevich do not wake Pluzhnikov to save the young private's life. The next morning, Stephan Matveevich realizes his wounds are gangreous and he will not survive. He heroically charges Germans holed in one of the fortress towers and thrust himself inside holding a grenade.

Pluzhnikov and Mirra survive together alone for weeks after. Pluzhnikov and Mirra grow close in their time together, ultimately falling in love. They hold a short ceremony as an informal marriage in the dark basement. Pluzhnikov continues to make sneak attacks on Germans and learns how to move silently and stealthily along the fortress corridors. Eventually, Pluzhnikov captures a German soldier and interrogates him. Not wanting his position to be compromised, Pluzhnikov moves to shoot the German. The soldier fell to his knees and begs Pluzhnikov to save him. He tells that he is from Austria and has a wife and three children. Pluzhnikov spares the man.

On a later raid, Pluzhnikov finds a pair of other survivors in the basements: sergeants Nebogatov and Klimkov. They want to leave the fortress for Białowieża Forest and join the partisans operating there. Pluzhnikov allows them to grab some ammunition and suggests they go to partisans together. He brings them to his and Mirra's basement. Nebogatov knew Mirra well before the war and says that she will not survive the partisan lifestyle. When Pluzhnikov says that he will not go without his wife, they begin to insult him and make mocking speculations about his and Mirra's sexual relations. Pluzhnikov furiously kicks them out from their basement but Mirra gives them ammo before they leave.

In autumn of 1941, a month or so after the invasion, Mirra discovers she is pregnant. Pluzhnikov persuades Mirra to leave the basement for the child's sake. He wants to send her to a group of local women, mobilized by Germans for works inside the fortress. Mirra tries to join them, but while some of the women agree to hide her, others call for the Hilfspolizei. One of the collaborators realizes that Mirra hides herself in the basement when he smells the dew on her clothes. He then beats her and her unborn child to death with his rifle stock.

In winter 1941, a high ranking German officer arrives at the fortress. Pluzhnikov tries to shoot him but only kills a couple of his guards, as his eyesight is deteriorating due to days spent in the dark basement. Germans continue to comb through ruins of the fortress but still don't dare to enter the basement.

Instead, the Germans decide to send a Jewish captive, former violinist Ruvim Svitsky from the Brest ghetto, inside the basement. He offers Pluzhnikov a chance to surrender and says if he refuses, Svitsky's family will be shot by Germans and the basement will be burned out by flamethrowers. He begs Pluzhnikov to surrender. Half-blind, exhausted, starving and mentally defeated, Pluzhnikov chooses to surrender to save the Svitsky and his family. Svitsky then tells Pluzhnikov of rumors circulating inside the ghetto about the German defeat outside Moscow but also adds "this is just rumors." Pluzhnikov realizes that his struggle was not for nothing, and the Motherland has not been defeated.

Lieutenant Pluzhnikov and Svitsky leave the basement, German soldiers immediately surrounding them. The German officer asks Pluzhnikov about his name and rank and orders Svitsky to act as a translator. Half-blind, exhausted and hoarse Pluzhnikov answers: "I'm a Russian soldier." Svitsky begs Pluzhnikov to say his real name and rank but he only repeats those words.

The German officer then orders his soldiers to salute the last Soviet defender of the Brest Fortress.

== Cast ==
- Dmitry Medvedev as Lieutenant Pluzhnikov
- Milena Tskhovreba-Agranovich as Mirra
- Aleksey Buldakov as Sergeant
- Albert Arntgolts as Ruvim Svitsky, violinist (voiced by Igor Yasulovich)
- Natalia Vysotskaya as Christa
- Pyotr Yurchenkov as Senior Sergeant Fedorchuk
- Alexander Pyatkov as Sergeant Tolya Nebogatov
- Dmitry Osherov as soldier Vasya Volkov

== Awards ==
- 1996 — Grand Special Prize at the International Film Festival Golden Knight in Minsk
- 1996 — Prize of Golden Lotus on the Pyongyang International Film Festival (North Korea)

== Other facts ==
- Boris Vasilyev, author of the novel, a negative attitude to this statement as "from the story could not do another series. In one series, you do not have time to show the main thing: how the boy grows from folk hero who is not afraid of anything, for it is death — deliverance from the torment of memories, grief, of all!"
- A screen adaptation of the novel were planning to do Leonid Bykov and Vadim Abdrashitov. For various reasons (early tragic death of Bykov's) and nationality of the main character (Mirra), it is up to the 90s failed.

== See also ==
- His Name Was Not Listed
