= Life on call =

2022 Russian drama series

- Genre: Crime drama Melodrama
- Written by: Aleksey Gravitskiy; Anna Kulayeva
- Directed by: Sarik Andreasyan
- Starring: Pavel Priluchny; Elizaveta Moryak
- Music by: Artashes Andreasyan (10 episodes, 2022); Artem Kazaku (20 episodes, 2022-2024); Manuk Kazaryan (20 episodes, 2022-2024)
- Country of origin: Россия
- Original language: Russian
- No. of seasons: 3
- No. of episodes: 30

Production
- Production location: Moscow
- Cinematography: Karen Manaseryan (10 episodes, 2022); Anatoliy Simchenko (10 episodes, 2023); Kirill Puntus(10 episodes, 2024)
- Camera setup: Single-camera
- Running time: 28–49 min
- Production company: Kion

Original release
- Network: Kion
- Release: September 25, 2022 – present

Life on call (Russian: Жизнь по вызову, romanized: Zhizn po vyzovu, transl. Life on call) Russian drama series directed by Sarik Andreasyan and released in the Kion online cinema in 2022.

On August 23, 2023, the documentary film "Life on Call. Doc", based on the personal stories of those for whom "Life on Call" is not a series, but reality.

On August 25, 2024, the documentary film "Life on Call. A Male View", which for the first time shows the attitude of clients towards the intimate services market.

== Plot ==
The main plot of the series is connected with the life of the escort industry in modern Russia. The main character Alexander Schmidt (Pavel Priluchny), nicknamed "Magic" - the owner of the elite escort agency of the same name - is faced with an attempted raider takeover of his business by very influential people acting anonymously. Throughout the film, Magic tries to figure out where the threat comes from and protect his business, while simultaneously dealing with problems that arise with wealthy clients and escort girls, as well as family problems associated with raising his growing daughter.

== Cast ==
- Pavel Priluchny – Alexander Schmidt ("Magic"), owner of an escort agency
- Vasilina Yuskovets – Alina Shmidt, daughter of Magic
- Oleg Kamenshchikov – "Fisherman", Schmidt's assistant
- Victoria Bogatyreva – Galina, administrator
- Natalia Rudova – Elena, lawyer
- Lisa Moryak – Nastya, escort
- Nikita Kologrivyy – Anton, Nastya's brother
- Kirill Zhandarov – Zimin, Major of the Investigative Committee
- Aleksandr Yatsko – Ruzhinsky, businessman
- Vladimir Sychev – Konov, client
- Alexey Kirsanov – Vadik, brothel owner
- Anna Churina – Natasha, Ruzhinsky's wife
- Mikhail Bogdasarov – Menzhidov, oligarch, client
- Mikhail Gorevoy – Barinov, client
- Sergey Komarov – Ratkevich, businessman
- Margarita Shabardygina – Dasha, Alina's friend
- Evgenia Yarushnikova – Irene, realtor
- Olga Smirnova – Victoria, escort girl
- Anna Glaube – Angela, Nastya's friend, who runs the brothel
- Alexander Dyachenko (actor) – Gradov, businessman
- Yanina Studilina – Katya, Schmidt's ex-wife
- Ellina Bandeeva – Tanya, escort girl
- Alexey Grishin – Captain Semenov

== List of seasons ==
| Season | Series | Broadcast period |
|---|---|---|
| 1 | 1—10 (10 episodes) | August 25 - October 20, 2022 |
| 2 | 11—20 (10 episodes) | September 1 - October 28, 2023 |
| 3 | 21—30 (10 episodes) | August 30 - October 25, 2024 |

== Criticism ==
Even before the release of the series, Forbes Life editor Sophia Brontwein spoke sharply negatively about it, calling the series:

"one of the highest quality and outdated projects about prostitution", also pointing out that "his main idea is to offend women."
