= Lyanka Gryu =

Russian actress (born 1987)

Lyanka Gryu Лянка Грыу
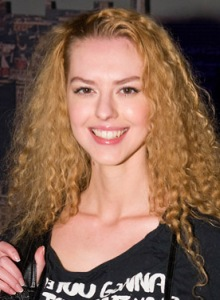
- In Moscow (2009)
- Born: Lyanka Georgievna Gryu ' 22 November 1987 (age 38); Moscow, RSFSR, USSR
- Citizenship: Russian
- Occupation: Actress
- Years active: 1992–present
- Spouse: Mikhail Vaynberg (2010–2022)
- Children: 1
- Awards: Rolan Bykov Award

Lyanka Georgievna Gryu (Russian: Ля́нка Гео́ргиевна Гры́у, Romanian: Leanca Gheorghievna Grâu; born 22 November 1987) is a Russian theater and film actress.

== Biography ==
Lyanka Gryu was born in Moscow, Russian SFSR, Soviet Union. Her father was Moldovan actor Gheorghe Grâu (Gryu). Her mother was Russian actress Stella Ilnitskaya. Her parents separated when Lyanka was a child, and the father no longer maintains ties with the family.

Gryu first appeared in film at four years old. At that time, her mother was finishing the Gerasimov Institute of Cinematography (VGIK) and together with the four-year old Lyanka lived in a dormitory. In the corridors of the institute, Lyanka was noticed by chance was offered a role in the short film One, based on a story by Ray Bradbury. The film received a large number of prizes in Europe as well as smaller festivals.

At the insistence of producers, Gryu worked under the stage name Lyana Ilnitskaya, a name the executives felt was more palatable to Russian audiences.

At the age of six, Gryu hosted a children's TV show called Tic-Tac.

Her first major role was Becky in the movie A Little Princess (1997) by director Vladimir Grammatikov. For her role in the film, Ilnitskaya won the prize for Best Actress at the Rolan Bykov Moscow International Children's Film Festival, and the prize for Best Actress at the Film Festival Orlyonok.

In 2000, Ilnitskaya was filmed by director Oleg Pogodin in Triumph: Diary of the Red, a story revolving around the main characters, children, playing adult games. The actress was 13 years old at the time. The film was never released.

At 18 years, before entering the acting department Gerasimov Institute of Cinematography (course of Vladimir Grammatikov) Gryu stopped using her stage name and began working as Lyanka Gryu.

Gryu's career bloomed in 2009, when she performed in two title roles: The Return of the Musketeers, or The Treasures of Cardinal Mazarin by Georgi Yungvald-Khilkevich, where she played the daughter of D'Artagnan Jacqueline; and the series Barvikha, where she played Evgeniya Kolesnichenko - a student from the "City" elite school. For the role of the daughter of D'Artagnan, Lyanka spent over 2 months in preparation, learning both horseback riding and fencing.

In summer 2011, Gryu was chosen for the role of Irene Adler in the new Russian series about the adventures of Sherlock Holmes with Igor Petrenko in the title role.

In 2016, Gryu performed in the US independent film Impossible Monsters by Nathan Catucci and FX's television series The Americans.

Gryu divorced after 11 years of marriage and has a son.

== Filmography ==
- 1992: One as Katya
- 1996: The Third Son as episode
- 1997: A Little Princess as Becky
- 1998: Who If Not Us as Irochka
- 2000: Triumph as Katya
- 2001: Detectives 4 as Lena
- 2001: Naked Nature as Ksyusha
- 2005: Popsa as Alisa
- 2005 / 2007: Doomed to Become A Star as Violetta
- 2006: Rogues as Nastya
- 2007: Experts as Inna
- 2009: The Return of the Musketeers, or The Treasures of Cardinal Mazarin as Jacqueline, the daughter of D Artagnan
- 2009: Barvikha as Zhenya Kolesnichenko
- 2010: Skipped Parts as Darya
- 2010: Heart to Heart as Zhenya
- 2013: In a Sport Only Girl as Jane
- 2013: Sherlock Holmes as Irene Adler
- 2014: The Pregnancy Test as Olga Olshanskaya
- 2017 / 2018: The Americans as Elina Sachko
- 2019: Impossible Monsters as Shayna
