= Kinopanorama =

Widescreen film format

Kinopanorama is a three-lens, three-film widescreen film format. Although Kinopanorama was initially known as Panorama (Russian: панорамный фильм, panoramnyy film) in the Soviet Union the name was later revised to include its current name prior to the premiere screenings in Moscow in 1958. In some countries, including Cuba, Greece, Norway and Sweden, it was usually marketed as Soviet Cinerama. When Great Is My Country and The Enchanted Mirror, were exhibited at the Mayfair Theatre in New York City in 1958, it was briefly advertised as Cinepanorama. Kinopanorama is for the most part identical in operation to that of Fred Waller's American-designed Cinerama format.

== Overview ==
Kinopanorama was developed between 1956 and 1957 by research technicians at the USSR Cinema and Photo Research Institute (also known as NIKFI). The chief designer of the prototype camera was Evsei Mikhailovich Goldovskii (1903–1971), the eminent Soviet inventor and scientist. The mechanical design of the first camera, which was designated as model SKP-1, evolved from the comprehensive research into other patents, each of which cited the invention of devices for the filming—and projection—of 'mosaic images' (moving and still), lodged with the United States Patent Office (dating from 1948 onwards) by, among others, Fred Waller and Richard C Babish of the Vitarama Corporation; Winton Hoch ASC; and, lastly, Paul Stanley Smith and George Wilber Moffitt, of the Smith-Dietrich Corporation), the co-inventors of Cinemiracle, a rival three-lens, three-film widescreen format. The Soviets accessed these patents without difficulty, as each was a matter of public record, available for sighting by prospective inventors and patent attorneys. The Soviets, on the other hand, did not publish or register their Kinopanorama camera with foreign patent offices.

There are various, albeit minor, technical differences in the film perforations between Kinopanorama, which at the time of its invention was milled to accept the Kodak Standard (KS 1866) 'positive perforation' 4740 short-pitch camera negative stock, and those of the Cinerama and Cinemiracle cameras. Cinerama and Cinemiracle employ Bell and Howell (BH 1866) 'negative perforation' 4740 short-pitch and Dubray-Howell long-pitch 'negative perforation', respectively, for their modified Mitchell cameras. It is believed that the prototype Cinerama camera number one, on display in the foyer of the National Media Museum in Bradford, West Yorkshire, UK, was originally milled for Dubray-Howell negative perforations, although this has never been confirmed.

The first Kinopanorama film, Vast is my Native Land, which in North America was titled Great Is My Country, was premiered on 28 February 1958, at the Mir Kino Theatre in Moscow. The event was profiled in The New York Times. The Enchanted Mirror, the second Kinopanorama film, received a special prize at the Brussels World's Fair known as Expo '58. Twelve Kinopanorama films were produced in the original three-lens format (plus an additional eight in single-negative Kinopanorama 70) until 1966. Opasniye Povoroty, the first dramatic film (released internationally in 1962) was produced with an improved Kinopanorama camera, known as the PSO-1960. This redesigned camera, of which six were manufactured, allowed for the use of interchangeable lens kits of focal lengths from 27 mm to 100 mm.

== Kinopanorama cinemas ==
Seven cinemas designed (or renovated) for the exhibition of 3-film (and later 70mm) Kinopanorama were built in the former USSR from 1958 onwards. The Mir Kino Theatre, which opened in Moscow on 28 February 1958, was followed by others in Leningrad and Kiev. A Kinopanorama cinema later opened in Paris, France. These cinemas employed equipment designed and manufactured in the Soviet Union.

As of 2023, the National Media Museum in Bradford, England is the only remaining cinema equipped to exhibit three-strip Kinopanorama.

== Relaunch ==
The Kinopanorama three-lens process was re-launched in 1993 by Fifth Continent Movie Classics in Australia. John Steven Lasher, the former record label executive, secured the purchase of PSO-1960 camera number six, which was restored by NIKFI technicians to working order.

A test film, known as Chastity, Truth and Kinopanorama (a pun on the title of Steven Soderbergh's Sex, Lies, and Videotape) was shot in Moscow in 1993 before the camera and crew were flown to Sydney. A short documentary film titled The Bounty was screened on 19 March 1995 at the Bradford Widescreen Festival.

In 1999, Fifth Continent and Vision 146 SARL produced a two-reel restoration of Opasniye Povoroty from the original Sovcolor camera negatives. The restoration was premiered in Dayton, Ohio, USA, at the New Neon Movies and was screened at the Pacific Theatres Cinerama Dome in Hollywood in October 2004, and at the Bradford Widescreen Festival on March 19, 2008. Further restoration of the remaining reels was cancelled by both companies due to high costs.

In 2006, Fifth Continent converted the PSO-1960 camera to accept camera negative stock milled for the BH 4740 'negative perforation'. This is because film stock is no longer milled for KS 'positive perforation'. In 2007, a crystal-sync motor replaced the original 24-volt DC variable speed motor as well as the 240-volt 3-phase 50-hertz sync motor.

== See also ==
- List of film formats
