= Daddy (2004 film) =

2004 film

- Film poster
- Directed by: Vladimir Mashkov
- Written by: Aleksandr Galich
- Starring: Vladimir Mashkov
- Cinematography: Oleg Dobronravov
- Release date: 26 June 2004
- Running time: 94 minutes
- Country: Russia
- Language: Russian

Daddy (Russian: Папа, romanized: Papa) is a 2004 Russian drama film directed by and starring Vladimir Mashkov. It was entered into the 26th Moscow International Film Festival.

== Plot ==
Abraham Schwartz, a bookkeeper living in a small town in Ukraine, makes everything possible to educate his son as a violinist and to send him to Moscow where the latter is educated, earns popularity and finds his love. But when the father comes to Moscow to see his son, the latter feels embarrassed of his "improper" origin, "ugly" look and behaviour. Soon a war erupts, and the home town is taken by Germans while the son serves in the army.

== Cast ==
- Vladimir Mashkov as Abraham Schwartz
- Egor Beroev as David
- Andrei Rozendent as David Schwartz, 12 Years
- Olga Krasko as Tanya
- Lidiya Pakhomova as Tanya, 12 Years
- Olga Miroshnikova as Hannah
- Kseniya Barkalova as Hannah, 12 Years
- Sergey Dreyden as Meyer Wolf
- Kseniya Lavrova-Glinka as Lyudmila Shutova (as Kseniya Glinka)
- Anatoly Vasilyev as Ivan Kuzmich Chernyshov
- Andrey Smolyakov as Odintsov
