= Pavel Priluchny =

Russian actor

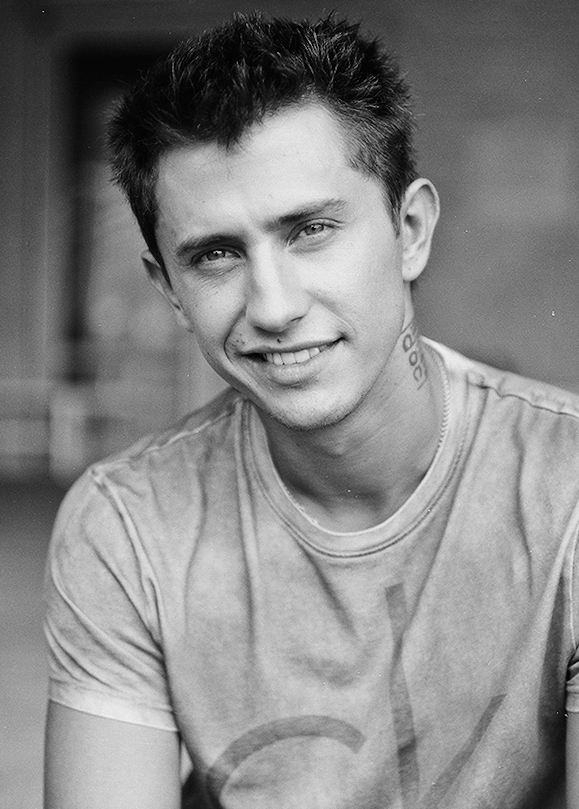
- Born: Pavel Valerievich Priluchny; 5 November 1987 (age 38); Chimkent, Chimkent Oblast, Kazakh SSR, USSR
- Occupations: Actor, TV host
- Years active: 2007–present
- Spouse: Agata Mutsenietse (m. 2011; div. 2020)
- Children: 3

Pavel Valerievich Priluchny (Russian: Павел Вале́рьевич Прилучный; born 5 November 1987) is a Kazakhstani-born Russian actor of theater and cinema, TV host, best known for his roles in the television series Silver Spoon and The Life and Adventures of Mishka Yaponchik.

== Biography ==
=== Early years and education ===
Pavel Priluchny was born in Chimkent, Chimkent Oblast, Kazakh SSR, Soviet Union (now Kazakhstan). His mother was a choreographer and his father a boxing trainer. Pavel spent his childhood and teenage years doing choreography and boxing. He studied at a theater school in Novosibirsk, and performed at the youth theater "Globus".

Pavel moved to Moldova when he was seventeen. He entered the Russian Academy of Theatre Arts, but because of a mistake in the paperwork, his name was not on the list of the candidates. Instead of waiting for the mix-up to be corrected, he decided to enter the Moscow Art Theater School (course of Konstantin Raikin. He studied there for only two years. Priluchny later finished his education in 2010 at GITIS (course of Sergei Golomazov).

Immediately after graduation, he was accepted into the troupe of the Moscow Drama Theater in Malaya Bronnaya. Then he worked at the Moscow Pushkin Drama Theatre and at the Bulgakov Theater (Bulgakov House).

=== Career ===
He received his first recognition after the release of the action movie directed by Pavel Sanayev Hooked on the Game (2009), where he played the role of "Doc". In early 2010, starred in the sequel "Hooked on the Game 2. A New Level."

In 2014, he starred in the television series Silver Spoon in the role of Igor Sokolovsky, a golden boy who unexpectedly has to work in the police.

In 2012, he co-starred in season one of Freud’s Method.

From 2 July to 19 August 2011 Pavel participated in the program "A Couple of Pinochets" on the NTV channel.

In the summer of 2011, he appeared in the music video "Everything is Decided" by Elvira T.

Since 2017, he is the host of entertainment show "Kings of Plywood" on the First Channel.

== Personal life ==
In 2009, he was romantically involved with Hollywood actress Nikki Reed.

Pavel was previously married to Latvian actress Agata Muceniece in 2011. He and his wife have a son and a daughter. In February 2020, the couple divorced.

In 2022, he voiced his support for the Russian invasion of Ukraine.

== Selected filmography ==
Year	Title	Role	Notes
2009	Hooked on the Game	Doctor	
2010	Hooked on the Game 2. The Next Level	Doctor	
2010	Skipped Parts	Maksim	
2011	The Life and Adventures of Mishka Yaponchik	Leonid Utyosov	(TV series)
2013	Dark world - Equilibrium	Sam	
2014-2018	Silver Spoon	Igor Sokolovsky	(TV series)
2017	Life Ahead	Mikhail	
2018	Frontier	Mikhail Shurov	
2021	Fib the Truth	older sister's ex-boyfriend	
2021	V2. Escape from Hell	Mikhail Devyatayev	
2022	Life on call	Alexander Schmidt (“Magic”), owner of an escort agency	(TV series)
2024	Kombinaciya	Alexander Iratov	(TV series)
