= Novosibirsk State Theater Institute =

Novosibirsk State Theatre Institute
- Новосибирский государственный театральный институт
- Former names: Novosibirsk State Theater School
- Established: 1960
- Location: Novosibirsk, Russia
- Website: ngti.ru

Novosibirsk State Theater Institute (NSTI) (Russian: Новосибирский государственный театральный институт, НГТИ) is a state institute located in Novosibirsk, Russia. It was founded in 1960.

== Training directions ==
There are four specialities in the Institute:

- Musical theater actor
- Dramatical theater and film actor
- Variety actor
- Drama director

== Student theater ==
NSTI has their own student theater.

== Alumni ==
- Yuriy Nazarov – Soviet and Russian theater and cinema actor
- Pavel Priluchny – Russian theater and cinema actor
- Andrey Zvyagintsev – Russian film director and screenwriter; graduated from the theater school in 1984
- Vladimir Mashkov – Soviet and Russian cinema actor and director
- Aleksei Maklakov – Soviet and Russian actor and singer

== Institute departments in Novosibirsk ==
- Revolution Street 6
- Lenin Street 24
- Yadrintsevskya Street 66
