= The Dawns Here Are Quiet (opera) =

Opera

The Dawns Here Are Quiet (Зори здесь тихие) is a 1973 Russian-language opera by Kirill Molchanov based on the novel by Boris Vasilyev. The opera was performed at the Mariinsky Theatre in February 2015.
