= Andrey Kavun =

Russian film director

- Андрій Кавун
- Born: Andrey Olegovich Kavun; 9 December 1969; Lviv, UkSSR
- Occupation: filmmaker

Andrey Olegovich Kavun (Ukrainian: Андрій Олегович Кавун; Russian: Андрей Олегович Кавун; December 9, 1969) is a Ukrainian film director and screenwriter, notable for historical drama film Kandahar. In 1999 he graduated from the directing department of VGIK (workshop of Vladimir Khotinenko).

== Filmography ==
Year	Name	Director	Screenwriter	Editor	Composer	Producer
1997	Kotovasiya		Yes			
1999	Turetsky's March		Yes			
2001	Enmity		Yes			
2002—2003	Russian Amazons		Yes			
2003	Railway Station	Yes				
2004	Team	Yes				
2004	The Cadets	Yes				
2006	Piranha	Yes				
2006	Your Honor	Yes				
2009	Kandagar	Yes	Yes			
2010	Skipped Parts	Yes				
2012	Sherlock Holmes	Yes	Yes			
2014	Yolki 1914	Yes				
