= Sam Klebanov =

Russian and Swedish film industry executive

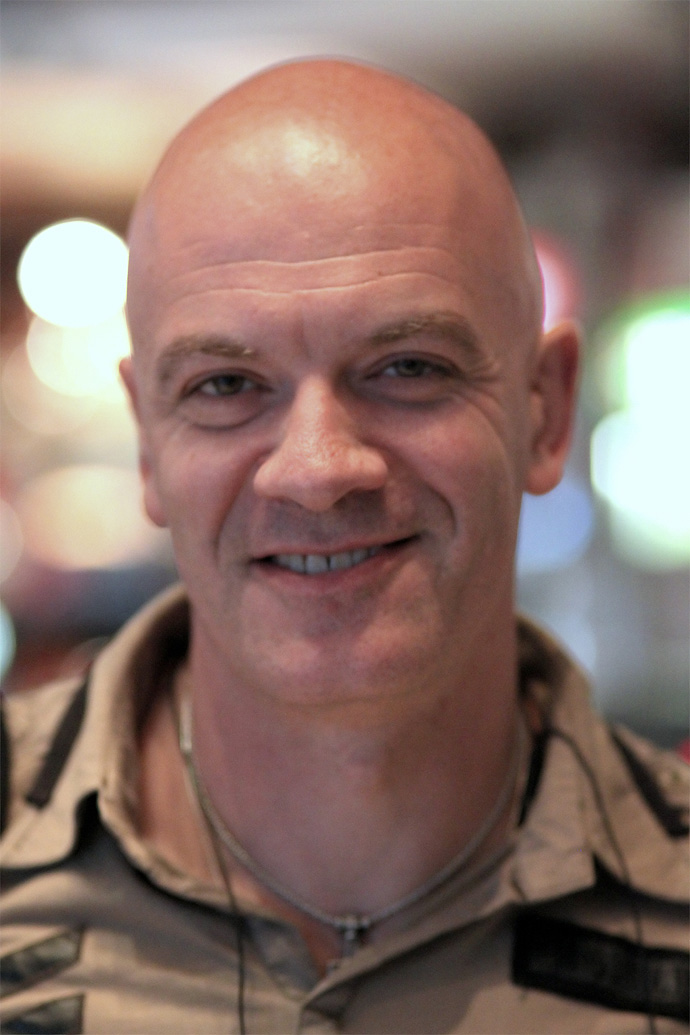
- Born: Samuil Yakovlevich Klebanov; April 14, 1965 (age 61); Leningrad, RSFSR, USSR
- Citizenship: Sweden
- Occupations: film producer film distributor television presenter
- Spouse: Irina Vinogradova
- Children: 1

Sam Klebanov (Russian: Сэм Клебанов, current name Samuel Klebanov (Russian: Самуил Яковлевич Клебанов); born April 14, 1965, Leningrad) is a Russian and Swedish film industry executive, film distributor, producer and TV host. In film business since 1996. In the early 2000s his company Cinema without Borders was the leading force of arthouse film distribution in Russia, in 2015 he also co-founded a Moscow-based distribution outfit Arthouse. Between 2001 and 2008, he was the author and host of the weekly show Magic of Cinema on the national TV channel Russia-K.

== Biography ==
Samuel Klebanov was born in Leningrad in 1965, but grew up and graduated from high school in Moscow. Between 1983 and 1985 he served in the Soviet Army in the OSNAZ (radio intelligence) forces on the territory of then GDR. In 1990 he graduated from the Moscow State University of Economics, Statistics, and Informatics, specializing in Applied Mathematics.

In 1991, after the August coup, he moved to Europe and settled in Gothenburg, Sweden and in 1997 became Swedish citizen. Between 1993 and 1997 he worked as a software developer and technical director in Swedish companies IFTECH Software AB and Software Engineering AB.

In 1996, he founded the company Maywin Media AB in Sweden to sell Scandinavian television programs and films to Russia and the CIS countries. In the same year he established the distribution company Cinema without Borders, which focused on releasing arthouse films in Russia. The first film, bought by him for the Russian release, was Hana-bi by Takeshi Kitano. After that, he began to plunge deeper into the world of the film industry. In the following years, the company Cinema without Borders became the leading player in the arthouse film distribution in Russia and the countries of the former USSR, releasing several hundred films theatrically and for home entertainment, including works by such directors as Takeshi Kitano, Ruben Östlund, Dardenne brothers, Michael Haneke, Alejandro González Iñárritu, Cristian Mungiu, Francis Ford Coppola, Kim Ki-duk, Park Chan-wook, Nuri Bilge Ceylan, Abdelatif Kechiche and many others.

Klebanov's sphere of interest is not limited to cinema alone. In 2013-2014 he was a regular columnist of the Russian version of the men's magazine GQ.

In the spring of 2015 he announced the launch of a new distribution outfit Arthouse in partnership with the American company Lorem Ipsum Corp. Under the new brand, Klebanov was going to continued to release independent and arthouse films in Russia in both theatrically and online, including such titles as Ruben Östlund's Force Majeure, Roy Andersson's A Pigeon Sat on a Branch Reflecting on Existence and Matthew Warchus' Pride.

In January 2016, Sam Klebanov left Arthouse and resumed independent film distribution activities under the brand Cinema without Borders. The most successful project of the revived Cinema without Borders was the release of Vitaly Mansky's documentary Under the Sun.

In the fall of 2017, Sam Klebanov, in partnership with software developer Pavel Rabetsky, founded a start-up Cinezen Blockchained Entertainment AB in Sweden. The company's goal was to create the world's first decentralized VOD (video-on-demand) platform based on block technology. The startup received seed financing from the Austrian-Israeli Venture Fund AltaIR Capital. In February 2018, at the European Film Market in Berlin, Cinezen announced signing of the first-ever licensing agreements for the online distribution of films using blockchain technology and put into circulation a new term BVOD (Blockchain Video-on-Demand). The launch of Beta-version of Cinezen's BVOD-platform was announced in October 2018.
