= Boris Vasilyev (writer) =

Russian writer (1924–2013)

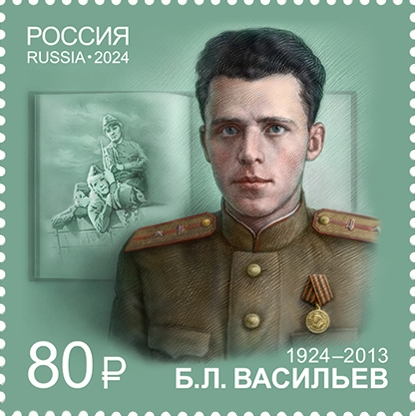
- Born: Boris Lvovich Vasilyev; 21 May 1924; Smolensk, Soviet Union
- Died: 11 March 2013 (aged 88); Moscow, Russia
- Occupation: Writer
- Years active: 1958–2013
- Spouse: Zorya Albertovna Vasilyeva
- Awards: Andrei Sakharov Prize for Writer's Civic Courage

Boris Lvovich Vasilyev (Russian: Борис Львович Васильев; 21 May 1924 – 11 March 2013) was a Soviet and Russian writer and screenwriter. He is considered the last representative of the so-called lieutenant prose, a group of former low-ranking Soviet officers who dramatized their traumatic World War II experience.

== Biography ==
Born into a family of Russian nobility. His father Lev Aleksandrovich Vasilyev (1892—1968) came from a dynasty of military officers; he served in the Imperial Russian Army and took part in the First World War in the rank of Poruchik before joining the Red Army. Vasilyev's mother Yelena Nikolayevna Alekseyeva (1892—1978) belonged to a noble Alekseyev family tree that traces its history back to the 15th century; her father was among the founders of the Circle of Tchaikovsky.

In 1941, Boris Vasilyev volunteered for the front line and joined a destruction battalion. He fought as part of the 3rd Guards Airborne Division up until 1943 when he was wounded in action and demobilized. After his World War II service, Vasilyev enrolled at the Malinovsky Tank Academy.

His short novel The Dawns Here Are Quiet was a Soviet bestseller, selling 1.8 million copies within a year after its publication in 1969. It was adapted for the stage and the screen; there is also an opera by Kirill Molchanov, and a Chinese TV series based on the story.

The Dawns Here Are Quiet was the first of Vasilyev's sentimental patriotic tales of female heroism in the Second World War ("Not on the Active List", 1974; "Tomorrow Was the War", 1984) which brought him renown in the Soviet Union, China, and other communist countries. Some of his books give a harsh picture of life in Stalin's Russia.

Vasilyev's short novel Do Not Shoot at White Swans (1973), a milestone of Russian-language environmental fiction, is sharply critical of "the senseless destruction of beautiful creatures and the exploitation of nature for personal gain". It was made into a 1980 Soviet film.

Vasilyev was awarded the USSR State Prize for 1975 and was a member of the jury at the 39th Berlin International Film Festival. In 1989, he quit the Communist Party but grew disillusioned with the Perestroika rather quickly. In October 1993, he signed the Letter of Forty-Two. Late in life, Vasilyev turned to historical fiction based on incidents from medieval Russian chronicles.

Vasilyev died on 11 March 2013 following the deaths of his wife and his adopted son earlier the same year. He was buried at the Vagankovo Cemetery near his wife.

== Selected filmography ==
Year	Title	Original title	
Year	Title	Original title	Notes
1964	Footprint in the Ocean	След в океане	with Kirill Rapoport
1966	Royal Regatta	Королевская регата	with Kirill Rapoport and Semyon Listov
1969	On the Way to Berlin	На пути в Берлин	with Kirill Rapoport and Yuri Chulyukin
1971	Officers	Офицеры	with Kirill Rapoport
1972	The Dawns Here Are Quiet	А зори здесь тихие	with Stanislav Rostotsky
1972	The Last Day	Самый последний день	with Mikhail Ulyanov
1976	One-Two, Soldiers Were Going...	Аты-баты, шли солдаты ...	with Kirill Rapoport
1980	Do Not Shoot at White Swans	Не стреляйте в белых лебедей	with Kirill Rapoport
1987	Tomorrow Was the War	Завтра была война	based on the novel
1988	Whose Are You, Old People?	Вы чьё, старичьё?	based on the novel
1995	I, a Russian soldier	Я — русский солдат	based on the novel
2009	Peraanmai	பேராண்மை	based on the novel, Indian film
2015	The Dawns Here Are Quiet	А зори здесь тихие ...	based on the novel
