= Kandagar =

2010 Russian film directed by Andrey Kavun

- Film poster
- Directed by: Andrey Kavun
- Screenplay by: Andrey Kavun
- Produced by: Valeriy Todorovskiy; Ilya Neretin
- Starring: Aleksandr Baluev; Vladimir Mashkov; Andrei Panin
- Edited by: Gabriella Cristiani
- Music by: Richard Horowitz; Darin Sysoev
- Release date: 4 February 2010
- Running time: 103 minutes
- Country: Russia
- Languages: Russian; Dari
- Budget: $7 million
- Box office: $15 million

Kandagar (Russian: Кандагар; also known as Kandahar) is a 2010 Russian historical action film detailing the escape of a Russian crew from the captivity of Taliban fighters in Afghanistan in 1996. The film stars some of Russia's most famous actors, Vladimir Mashkov, Andrei Panin and Alexander Baluyev. The movie is based on the Russian pilot Vladimir Sharpatov's diary. The film was released in Russia on April 4, 2010. The Andrey Kavun film is the first to depict Russians in Afghanistan after the Soviet withdrawal from the country.

== Background ==
On August 3, 1995 a Mikoyan-Gurevich MiG-21 from the Taliban's air force forced down a Russian Ilyushin Il-76 plane with seven Russian nationals on board. The aircraft was forced to land at a Taliban controlled airfield near Kandahar. The men were held prisoners for more than one year by the Taliban which controlled about half of Afghanistan at the time during the Afghan Civil War. The movie follows their captivity, day-to-day survival, and escape from the Taliban.

Unexpected negligence from Russian diplomats caused the prisoners to take steps toward their freedom themselves. The captain was forced to teach Taliban fighters to fly the plane, and the rest of the hostages were allowed to visit their aircraft for maintenance.

At some point the Russian crew worked out the escape plan, and during one of the maintenance visits for landing gear work, they were able to gain control over the plane. Despite interception efforts by Taliban base guards, which forced the aircraft to take off using only half of the runway, they were able to take off. The crew overcame several technical difficulties immediately after takeoff, finally gained a safe cruising altitude and speed, and managed to reach Sharjah.

== Cast ==
- Aleksandr Baluev – Vladimir Ivanovich Sharpatov, pilot
- Vladimir Mashkov – Serega, co-pilot
- Andrei Panin – Alexander Gotov, navigator
- Alexandr Golubev – Vitek, boardwriter
- Bohdan Beniuk – Roman Vakulenko, flight engineer
- Aleksandr Robak – Mark

== See also ==
- The 9th Company
