= Kvartet I =

Russian theater company

Kvartet I (/i/, Russian: Кварте́т И) is a Russian theater company founded in Moscow in 1993 by a group of graduates from the Russian Academy of Theatre Arts.Kvartet I also made several films.

The founding members of Kvartet I were: Kamil Larin, Rostislav Chait, Leonid Barats and Aleksandr Demidov.

== Filmography ==
Most movies were directed by Dmitry Dyachenko

- Election Day (2007)
- Radio Day (2008)
- What Men Talk About (2010)
- What Men Still Talk About (2011)
- Faster Than Rabbits (2014)
- Election Day 2 (2016)
- Wonderland (2016)
- What Men Talk About: The Sequel (2018)
- Speakerphone (2019)
- Storytelling (2020)
- Feedback (2020)
- What Men Talk About: Simple Pleasures (2023)
- A Day in Istanbul (2024)

=== Television and web series ===
- Money (2002)
- Kvartet I down the Amstel (2013)
- There's something missing in Borenka (2021)
