= Election Day (2007 film) =

- Russian: День выборов
- Directed by: Oleg Fomin
- Written by: Sergey Petreykov; Rostislav Khait; Leonid Barats
- Produced by: Nikolai Ulyanov; Oleg Beglov
- Starring: Kvartet I; Vasily Utkin; Mikhail Yefremov; Nonna Grishayeva; Maksim Vitorgan
- Cinematography: Vasily Sikachinsky
- Music by: Alexey Kortnev; Sergei Chekryzhov
- Production company: STAR-T
- Release date: 18 October 2007
- Running time: 125 min
- Country: Russia
- Language: Russian

Election Day (Russian: День выборов, romanized: Den vyborov) is a 2007 Russian political satire film directed by Oleg Fomin.

== Synopsis ==
The staff of a successful Moscow radio station are sent into the Volga region to assist in the promotion of a candidate for the local governor elections. They are assisted by the local theatre director, a fake priest, and their boss' connections.

== Cast ==
- Kvartet I:
  - Kamil Larin as Kamil, the electrician
  - Rostislav Khait as Slava, the journalist of the "Kind of radio"
  - Aleksandr Demidov as Sasha, the administrator of the "Kind of radio" and the campaign manager
  - Leonid Barats as Alex, the journalist of the "Kind of radio"
- Vasily Utkin as Igor Vladimirovich Tsaplin, a candidate for Governor of Samara Oblast
- Yevgeny Steblov as San Sanych, the director of the Petukhov Russian Regional Drama Theatre
- Mikhail Yefremov as "Father Innocent" (in fact con artist Mikhail)
- Nonna Grishayeva as Nonna, the host of the "Kind of radio"
- Maksim Vitorgan as Max, the host of the "Kind of radio"
- Mikhail Kozyrev as Mikhail Natanovich, the general producer of the "Kind of radio"
- Yelena Shevchenko as Viktoria, Emmanuil Gedeonovich‘s companion
- Yelena Knyazeva as Lyolya, Viktoria’s friend
- Anna Azarova as Anya, Mikhail's lover and secretary
- Aleksandr Semchev as Yemelyanov, the incumbent Governor of Samara Oblast
- Alexey Kortnev as Alexey Paramonov, the Cossack ataman
- Valery Barinov as Lieutenant General Ivan Burdun, commander of the "top secret" military base
- Pavel Abdalov as Boris, the manager of the liquor producer
- Mikhail Evlanov as Fedya, Boris's side-kick
- Sergey Chonishvili as Emmanuil Gedeonovich (voice only)
- Alexander Gurevich as Alexey Vitalyevich Alinkin, a candidate for Governor of Saratov Oblast
- Cameos:
  - Andrey Makarevich and Georgy Martirosyan (duo of non-commercial song Two Against The Wind)
  - Sergey Shnurov and Leningrad (The Innormals)
  - Bi-2 (Smoke On The Water)
  - Uma2rman (UpSideDown)
  - Valeriy Syutkin (the band of the furniture store Oliver Twist)
  - Seryoga (Nikola Sokol)
  - Ivanushki International (Ivan and Ushki)
  - Chaif (The Volga Bells Duo)
  - Dmitry Pevtsov, Yevgeny Stychkin, Marat Basharov and Oleg Fomin (The Dentists)
  - Marianna Maksimovskaya
  - Vladimir Kara-Murza Sr. (TV version only)

== Reception ==
=== Box office ===
Election Day has grossed US$6 149 746.

=== Critical response ===
Film.ru reviewer Valery Kichin called Oleg Fomin's film a really funny and really relevant comedy.

As noted by political consultant Igor Mintusov, it was filmed very talentedly and very well, there are many moments well captured in form. Although the reality is quite adequately shown there, there are few strategic ideas to be seen there.

According to Boris Nadezhdin, an unregistered candidate for the 2024 Russian presidential election, he had told some of the amusing political stories that would later become the basis for the plot of play and film to the Kvartet I himself.

== Sequel ==
- Election Day 2 (2016)
