= Leonid Barats =

Russian screenwriter, actor and director

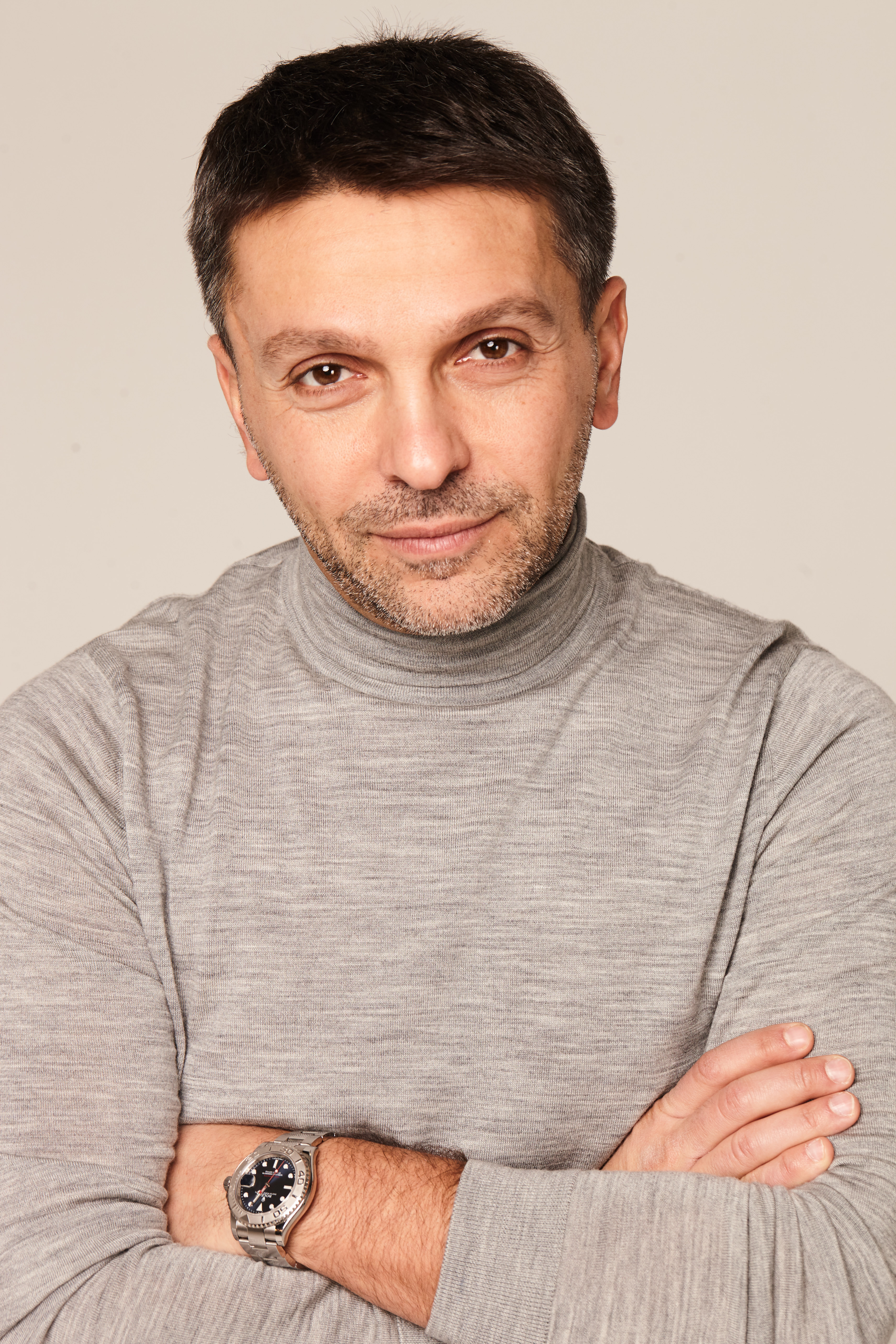
- Born: Leonid Barats; 18 July 1971 (age 54); Odesa, Ukrainian SSR
- Occupation(s): Actor, screenwriter, film producer

Leonid Barats (Russian: Леонид Григорьевич Барац; Ukrainian: Леонід Григорович Барац) is a Ukrainian and Russian actor, screenwriter and film producer. Merited Artist of the Russian Federation.

== Selected filmography ==
| Year | Title | Role | Notes |
|---|---|---|---|
| 2007 | Election Day | Lyosha | |
| 2008 | Radio Day | Lyosha | |
| 2010 | What Men Talk About | Lyosha | |
| 2011 | What Men Still Talk About | Lyosha | |
| 2019 | Speakerphone | Vadim | |
| 2020 | Feedback | Vadim | |
| 2023 | What Men Talk About. Simple Pleasures | | |
