= Perfect Strangers (2016 film) =

2016 Italian film by Paolo Genovese

- Theatrical release poster
- Italian: Perfetti sconosciuti
- Directed by: Paolo Genovese
- Screenplay by: Filippo Bologna; Paolo Costella; Paolo Genovese; Paola Mammini; Rolando Ravello
- Story by: Paolo Genovese
- Produced by: Marco Belardi
- Starring: Giuseppe Battiston; Anna Foglietta; Marco Giallini; Edoardo Leo; Valerio Mastandrea; Alba Rohrwacher; Kasia Smutniak
- Cinematography: Fabrizio Lucci
- Edited by: Consuelo Catucci
- Music by: Maurizio Filardo
- Production companies: Medusa Film; Lotus Production
- Distributed by: Medusa Distribuzione
- Release date: 11 February 2016 (Italy)
- Running time: 97 minutes
- Country: Italy
- Language: Italian
- Box office: $32.2 million

Perfect Strangers (Italian: Perfetti sconosciuti [perˈfɛtti skonoʃˈʃuːti]) is a 2016 Italian psychological comedy-drama film directed and co-written by Paolo Genovese. It was released in Italy on 11 February 2016.

The film was a critical and commercial success, winning the David di Donatello in the Best Film Category and grossing more than €16 million in Italy..

As of January 2024, the film was recognised as the most remade film by Guinness World Records, with productions in 24 different languages.

== Plot ==
On the evening of a total eclipse of the moon, which is said to make people more emotional, seven close friends gather for a dinner party. Early in the meal time, one of the friends, a relationship therapist named Eva, says that she is convinced that many couples would separate if they saw the messages on each other's phones. As the friends debate this contention, they agree - some of them reluctantly - to play a game. They will each place their phone on the table and they will share their messages and calls with the rest of the group.

At first, the game seems harmless; no one has anything to hide. Gradually, the calls and messages become more compromising. They reveal that one married woman is having an affair and that a man who has been pretending to have an absent girlfriend is not who he seems to be. As the calls continue, the network of lies and secrets become increasingly tangled. Almost no one at the table is spared. By the end of the night, the group's friendships, marriages, and romances have been shattered.

After the lunar eclipse ends, it turns out that the game Eva suggested never actually took place, since Rocco had refused to participate because he realized how dangerous it could be to play with one’s own secrets: The film thus showed what could have happened if the game had taken place.

== Cast ==
- Giuseppe Battiston as Peppe
- Anna Foglietta as Carlotta
- Marco Giallini as Rocco
- Edoardo Leo as Cosimo
- Valerio Mastandrea as Lele
- Alba Rohrwacher as Bianca
- Kasia Smutniak as Eva
- Benedetta Porcaroli as Sofia

== Reception ==
=== Box office ===
The film was number-one on its opening week in Italy, with US$3.7 million. It grossed $31.6 million at the box office.

=== Critical response ===
On Rotten Tomatoes, it has an approval rating of 77% based on reviews from 13 critics, and an average rating of 6.7/10.

=== Accolades ===
Year	Award/Festival	Category	Recipients	Result
2016	David di Donatello	Best Film	Paolo Genovese	Won
2016	David di Donatello	Best Director	Paolo Genovese	Nominated
2016	David di Donatello	Best Script	Paolo Genovese, Filippo Bologna, Paolo Costella, Paola Mammini, Rolando Ravello	Won
2016	David di Donatello	Best Actress	Anna Foglietta	Nominated
2016	David di Donatello	Best Actor	Marco Giallini	Nominated
2016	David di Donatello	Best Actor	Valerio Mastandrea	Nominated
2016	David di Donatello	Best Original Song	Perfetti sconosciuti by Bungaro, Cesare Chiodo and Fiorella Mannoia	Nominated
2016	David di Donatello	Best Editing	Consuelo Catucci	Nominated
2016	David di Donatello	Best Sound	Umberto Montesanti	Nominated
2016	Bari International Film Festival	Tonino Guerra Award for Best Scriptment	Paolo Genovese	Won
2016	Tribeca Film Festival	Best Screenplay	Paolo Genovese, Filippo Bologna, Paolo Costella, Paola Mammini, Rolando Ravello	Won
2017	Vilnius International Film Festival	Audience's Favourite Film	Paolo Genovese	Won

== Remakes ==
Country	Original title	English title	Release date	Note
Greece	Τέλειοι Ξένοι	Perfect Strangers	15 December 2016	
Spain	Perfectos desconocidos	Perfect Strangers	1 December 2017	Directed by Álex de la Iglesia.
Turkey	Cebimdeki Yabancı	Stranger in My Pocket	2 February 2018	
France	Le Jeu	Nothing to Hide	17 October 2018	Directed by Fred Cavayé.
South Korea	완벽한 타인	Intimate Strangers	31 October 2018	
Hungary	BÚÉK	Happy New Year	6 December 2018	Directed by Krisztina Goda.
Mexico	Perfectos desconocidos	Perfect Strangers	25 December 2018	
China	来电狂响	Kill Mobile	29 December 2018	
Russia	Громкая связь	Loud Connection	14 February 2019	A sequel, Obratnaya svyaz, was released in 2020.
Armenia	Անհայտ բաժանորդ	Unknown Subscriber	5 September 2019	
Poland	(Nie)znajomi		16 September 2019	
Germany	Das perfekte Geheimnis		31 October 2019	
Vietnam	Tiệc trăng máu	Blood Moon Party	23 October 2020	
Japan	おとなの事情 スマホをのぞいたら		8 January 2021	
Slovakia, Czech Republic	Známi neznámi		5 August 2021	
Romania	Complet necunoscuți	Perfect Strangers	24 September 2021	
Netherlands	Alles op tafel	Perfect Strangers	4 November 2021	
Israel	זרים מושלמים	Perfect Strangers	11 November 2021	Directed by Lior Ashkenazi.
Egypt, Lebanon, United Arab Emirates	أصحاب ...ولا أعزّ	Perfect Strangers	20 January 2022	Released by Netflix.
Norway	Full dekning		25 February 2022	
Indonesia	Perfect Strangers		20 October 2022	Released by Amazon Prime Video.
Azerbaijan	Geri dönənlər		28 December 2022	
Iceland	Villibráð	Wild Game	6 January 2023	
Denmark, Iceland	Hygge!		26 October 2023	
India	Khel Khel Mein		15 August 2024	
Finland	Täydelliset vieraat		19 September 2025	
Brazil	Perfeitos Desconhecidos		7 November 2025	
Estonia	Täiuslikud võõrad		16 January 2026	Filmed simultaneously in Vilnius.
Lithuania	(ne)tobuli melagiai	Perfect Strangers	25 September 2026	Filmed simultaneously in Vilnius.
Latvia	Perfektie	The Perfect Ones	13 February 2026	Filmed simultaneously in Vilnius.
Thailand	เพื่อนรัก เพื่อนลับ	Behind the Screens	23 July 2026	

As of December 2017, remakes were underway in Qatar and Sweden.

In February 2017, The Weinstein Company acquired the rights to an English-language remake. In December 2019, Issa Rae was announced to write, star in, and produce the US remake with Spyglass Media Group, a subsidiary of Lantern Entertainment, which acquired the assets of The Weinstein Company after its bankruptcy. In December 2023, producer Tarak Ben Ammar revealed that his Eagle Pictures was working on the remake with Italian filmmaker Carlo Carlei set to direct the film. Rae was no longer attached to star.

Having been remade 24 times, the film was recognized as the most remade film in Guinness World Records. In 2025, Genovese said he had a "conflicting relationship" with the remakes, naming the Spanish remake as "the worst" and the Korean one as his favourite.

The Indian films Loudspeaker (2018), 1001 Nunakal (2022) and Ring Ring (2025) have been accused to have plagiarised Perfect Strangers. 12th Man (2022) was inspired by Perfect Strangers.

== Stage adaptations ==
A number of Spanish-language stage adaptations of Perfect Strangers have been produced. An Argentine adaptation directed by Guillermo Francella premiered in March 2018. A Spanish version adapted by David Serrano and Daniel Guzmán and directed by Guzmán premiered on 26 September 2018. A Uruguayan production premiered in April 2019. A Peruvian adaptation premiered on 9 October 2019. A Mexican production premiered in November 2019. A Colombian production premiered in March 2022.

An Israeli adaptation opened at the Habima Theatre on 22 November 2018. Two Slovene adaptations opened in 2019 and 2023, respectively.

An Italian adaptation, directed by Genovese himself, in his theatrical debut, premiered on 10 February 2023.

A Bosnian adaptation, directed by Lajla Kaikčija premiered in May 2024, in Sarajevos Kamerni teatar 55 (Chamber Theater 55).

An English-language adaptation written and directed by Robert O'Hara, titled Shit. Meet. Fan., premiered off-Broadway at MCC Theater on 10 October 2024.
