= Obratnaya svyaz =

Feedback
- Directed by: Aleksey Nuzhnyy
- Written by: Leonid Barats; Rostislav Khait; Sergey Petreykov
- Produced by: Leonid Barats; Ruben Dishdishyan; Rostislav Khait
- Starring: Leonid Barats; Irina Gorbacheva; Rostislav Khait; Mariya Mironova; Kamil Larin; Aleksandr Demidov
- Cinematography: Yuri Korobeynikov
- Edited by: Avet Oganesyan
- Production companies: amedia(ru); Mars Media Entertainment; Strela; Columbia Pictures
- Distributed by: Sony Pictures Releasing
- Release date: December 17, 2020
- Country: Russia
- Language: Russian

Feedback (Russian: Обратная связь, romanized: Obratnaya svyaz) is a 2020 Russian comedy film directed by Aleksey Nuzhnyy. It was theatrically released in Russia on December 17, 2020.

== Plot ==
The company of seven friends gathers together again in a house outside the city in order to celebrate the New Year. The holiday will give them a lot of surprises.

== Cast ==
- Leonid Barats as Vadim
- Irina Gorbacheva as Alina
- Rostislav Khait as Boris
- Mariya Mironova as Eva
- Kamil Larin as Lev
- Aleksandr Demidov as Dima
