= Emmanuil Vitorgan =

Russian actor

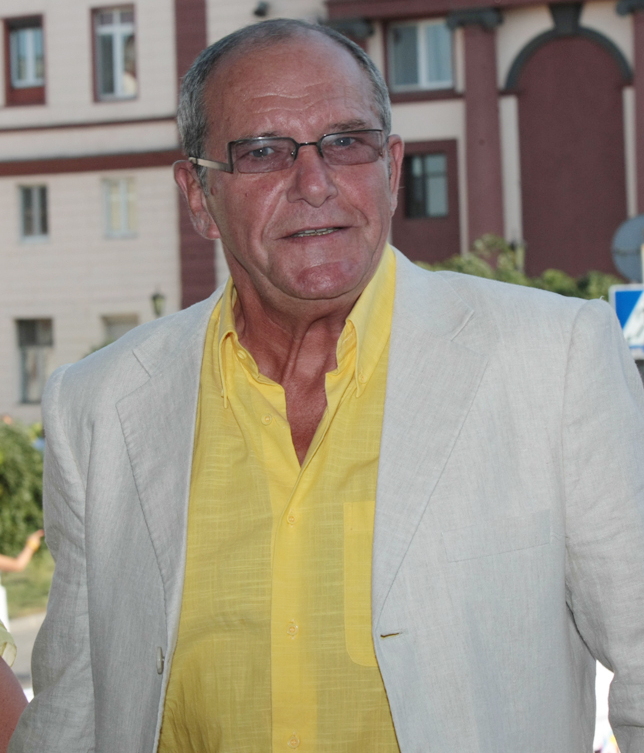
- Born: Emmanuil Gedeonovich Vitorgan; 27 December 1939 (age 86); Baku, Azerbaijan Soviet Socialist Republic
- Years active: 1962 — presents
- Spouse: Irina Mlodik
- Website: vitorgan.ru

Emmanuil Gedeonovich Vitorgan (Russian: Эммануи́л Гедео́нович Виторга́н; born 27 December 1939) is a Soviet, Russian film and theater actor, Honored Artist of the RSFSR (1990). People's Artist of Russia (1998). He acted in over a hundred films.

== Personal life ==
- First wife — actress Tamara Rumyantseva (born in 1936), the marriage broke up in 1970.
  - Daughter Ksenia Rumyantseva.
    - Grandchildren — Alexander and Nikita. Great-grandchildren - Mark and Alisa.
- Second wife — actress Alla Balter (1939–2000).
  - Son Maksim (1972) — film and theater actor, married to Ksenia Sobchak.
    - Grandchildren — Polina, Daniil and Platon.
- Third wife — Irina Mlodik (born in 1962).
  - Daughter Ethel (2018).
  - Daughter Klara (2019).

== Selected filmography ==
- 1960 — A Man with the Future as miner
- 1971 — King Lear as servant / Edgar (voice)
- 1980 — Star Inspector as Douglas Kober
- 1982 — Charodei as Viktor Kovrov
- 1983 — Anxious Sunday as Igor Chagin
- 1985 — Battle of Moscow as Yefim Fomin
- 1990 — Frenzied Bus as Mr. Anouk, a member of the Israeli Foreign Ministry
- 1991 — Anna Karamazoff as Prokudin-Gorsky, director
- 1992 — Weather Is Good on Deribasovskaya, It Rains Again on Brighton Beach as Jack
- 2003 / 2004 — Poor Nastya as Prince Pyotr Dolgoruky
- 2004 — Children of the Arbat as Sergey Spigelglas
- 2004 — Neznayka and Barrabass as Barrabass
- 2008 — Radio Day as Emmanuil Gedeonovich, owner of radio station
- 2010 — Sea Rex (Russian voice)
- 2011 — Svaty (TV) as Alexander Berkovich
- 2012 — Sklifosovsky (TV) as Mikhail Breslavets
- 2014 — Black Rose as Colonel Gromov
- 2014 — Yolki 1914 as Alexey Trofimovich
- 2016 — Friday as Sergei Dubravin
