= What Men Talk About =

- О чём говорят мужчины (O chyom govoryat muzhchiny)
- Directed by: Dmitriy Dyachenko
- Written by: Leonid Baratz; Sergei Petreykov; Rostislav Khait
- Produced by: Alexander Nakhimson; Sergei Petreykov; Rostislav Khait; Leonid Baratz; Aleksandr Tsekalo
- Cinematography: Yuri Lyubshin
- Music by: Bi-2
- Production company: Kinokompaniya Kvadrat
- Distributed by: Central Partnership
- Release date: March 4, 2010
- Country: Russia
- Languages: Russian; Ukrainian
- Box office: US$12.8 million

What Men Talk About (Russian: О чём говорят мужчины) is a 2010 Russian comedy written and directed by Dmitriy Dyachenko, filmed in the genre of road movie based on the Russian play Conversations middle-aged men have about women, movies and aluminum forks with the participation of the actors of the comic theatre "Quartet E". What Men Talk About is the third film adaptation of the theatre "Quartet". After a successful theatrical release, What Men Still Talk About was announced. In April 2010, the film began licensing issued on DVD by The Mystery of Sound.

== Plot ==
What Men Talk About? Of course, women. But also about work, money, cars, football ... but in general about women. And if they have two days when they escape from their offices and families, to get away from all the cares and commitments – two days, eventful and adventurous – you can be sure that this time they will have time to discuss a lot of things ... And More. From these conversations – we know for sure – many women learn about themselves a lot of new things. Four friends are going to go to Odesa for the concert of a famous Russian band Bi-2. Two of them, Alexey and Sasha, have problems in the morning: one can not deal with things around the house, the other – cannot get rid of the annoying customers at work. When, finally, they join their other friends who already left, Camille and Slava, they begin to talk about all sorts of things. Thus, the first day on the road passes. They spend the night in a hotel village ‘Beldyazhki’. The next day, the heroes continue to talk about life, passing through Kyiv, where they buy paintings by Tishchenko and at the same time discussing modern art. By the end of the movie 4 men get into a car accident, but still make it in time for the concert. "What Men Talk About" – this is the third, and by far, the best film of the cult theater "Quartet". Four middle-aged friends receive an invitation from their friend in Odesa to come to him for his birthday, and at the same time attend a concert of a famous Russian group "B-2". Each of them, like all of us, has a difficulty with time. One has work, the second – has his wife and children, the third – has both work and family, but still, with great a difficulty, they manage to escape for a few days. They sit in the car and go to the long journey. On the road, they have many adventures, many of which can knock a person out of a rut. But when you have people next to you with whom you can talk about everything, all the hardships of life become insignificant ... And real men are known to have a lot of different topics for discussion. Work, parties, money, music, clubs, and of course – women. If a man is still single, he is concerned about the issue – whether to get married. And married ones concern whether they can cheat on their wife.

== Cast ==
- Leonid Baratz – Lyosha
- Aleksandr Demidov – Sasha
- Kamil Larin – Kamil
- Rostislav Khait – Slava
- Nonna Grishayeva – Slava's imaginary wife
- Yelena Podkaminskaya – Nastya, Lyosha's wife
- Veronica Amirkhanova – Lisa, Lyosha's eldest daughter
- Valeria Godnaya – Eva, Lyosha's youngest daughter
- Natalia Sigova – Grandma 1
- Valentina Zubchenko – Grandma 2
- Maria Bondarenko – Grandma 3
- Maksim Vitorgan – Romeo
- Yulia Pyznar – Juliet
- Fyodor Dobronravov – a man who is in love with a sausage
- Sergei Nikonenko – the captain of the ship
- Maksim Nikitin – captain's assistant
- Nina Ruslanova – hotel administrator
- Jeanna Friske, Andrey Makarevich, Oleg Menshikov, Vasily Utkin, Bi-2 – cameo

== Music ==
The soundtrack to What men talk about

No.	Title	Length
1.	"Scandal"	3:30
2.	"River of Love"	4:08
3.	"Eternal ghostly counter""	5:11
4.	"Fair Bride"	5:27
5.	"Black Day"	3:44
6.	"Hit home"	7:34
7.	"When we become snow"	4:24
8.	"Faun Dj"	4:15
9.	"Her eyes (from William Shakespeare)""	4:52
10.	"Falling Snow"	4:04
11.	"Tango"	3:38
12.	"Fair Ska"	5:34
13.	"David Bowie"	4:55

== Release ==
The Russian premiere took place on March 4, 2010. During the first, the film collected 109 million rubles, thus becoming one of the leaders of the domestic box office. Total film has collected 679.5 million rubbles.

== Reception ==
Reception of What Men Talk About by Russian film critics was overwhelmingly positive, it received no negative reviews and rated 8.9/10 on average.

Julia Ioffe of Slate wrote that film illustrates attitudes about sexual liberation for men in Moscow.
