= O chyom govoryat muzhchiny. Prostye udovolstviya =

- Russian: О чём говорят мужчины. Простые удовольствия
- Directed by: Mikhail Polyakov
- Written by: Sergey Petreykov; Leonid Barats; Rostislav Khait
- Produced by: Eduard Iloyan; Denis Zhalinsky; Vitaly Shlyappo
- Starring: Rostislav Khait; Leonid Barats; Kamil Larin; Aleksandr Demidov; Mikhail Politseymako; Maksim Vitorgan; Garik Kharlamov; Dmitry Nagiyev
- Cinematography: Yana Rits
- Release date: February 2, 2023 (Russia)
- Country: Russia
- Language: Russian

O chyom govoryat muzhchiny. Prostye udovolstviya (Russian: О чём говорят мужчины. Простые удовольствия; lit. 'What Men Talk About. Simple Pleasures') is a Russian comedy film directed by Mikhail Polyakov. It was theatrically released on February 2, 2023.

== Plot ==
Old friends meet to drink champagne and talk about the personal. Aleksey tries to understand whether female friendship is real, Kamil wonders if it is possible to fire the one you consider your best friend, Slava remembers his first love, and Alexander talks about the loss of his dad and the need to have fun, no matter what. Walking around the center of Moscow, they also discuss the problems of screwing in light bulbs and candid photos on social networks.

== Cast ==
- Rostislav Khait
- Leonid Barats
- Kamil Larin
- Aleksandr Demidov
- Mikhail Politseymako
- Maksim Vitorgan
- Garik Kharlamov
- Dmitry Nagiyev
