= Karina Razumovskaya =

Russian theater and film actress (born 1983)

- Карина Разумовская
- Born: Karina Vladimirovna Razumovskaya; March 9, 1983 (age 43); Leningrad, RSFSR, USSR
- Occupation: Actress
- Years active: 2004-present

Karina Vladimirova Razumovskaya (Russian: Кари́на Влади́мировна Разумо́вская, born 9 March 1983) is a Russian theater and film actress.

== Biography ==
Karina Razumovskaya was born in Leningrad, Russian SFSR, Soviet Union (now Saint Petersburg, Russia) As a young girl in 1989, she made her debut in the film "Slowing Down in the Heavens". When she finished school, she entered the Russian State Institute of Performing Arts after which, in 2004, began working at the Tovstonogov Bolshoi Drama Theater.

== Personal life ==
She plays the guitar. Razumoskaya is married, and her husband is named Artyom.

== Filmography ==
Year	Title	Original Title	Role	Notes
1989	Slowing Down in the Heavens	Торможение в небесах		episode
1991	Act, Manya!	Действуй, Маня!		episode
2002	Purely for life	Чисто по жизни		TV series
2002	The Ark	Ковчег	Katya	
2003	A Tale of Spring Conscription	История весеннего призыва	Sveta	TV movie
2004	Sisters	Сёстры	Rita	TV mini-series
2004	Twins	Близнецы		TV series
2004	A Family Exchange	Родственный обмен	sisters Vera and Olya	TV series
2005	Adjutants of Love	Адъютанты любви	Olga Lopukhina	TV series
2006	There, Where Love Lives	Там, где живёт любовь	Marina Komarova	TV movie
2006	All Mixed-Up At Home	Всё смешалось в доме	Ksenia Maliukova	TV series
2006	Schedule of Fates	Расписание судеб	Polina	TV mini-series
2007	The Silver Samurai	Серебрянный самурай	Guide Nadya	TV
2008	I call on my door	Позвони в мою дверь	Polina	TV movie
2008	Blessed	Блаженная	Aleksandra	
2008	On the contour of the face	По контуру лица	Ona	Short
2008	Vicissitudes of life	Превратности судьбы	Anna Alekseeva	TV movie
2009	My	Мой	Sveta Sveshnikova	TV mini-series
2009	Kamenskaya: The sponsors	Каменская: Соавторы	Lena Safronova	TV movie
2009	House for two	Дом для двоих	Nastya Safonova	TV movie
2014-2018	Silver Spoon	Мажор	Captain Victoria Rodionova	TV series
2020	Zoya	Зоя	Praskovya Kulik	
2026	Be Gentle with Yourself	К себе нежно	Nadya	
