= Olga Medynich =

Russian theater and film actress (born 1981)

- Ольга Медынич
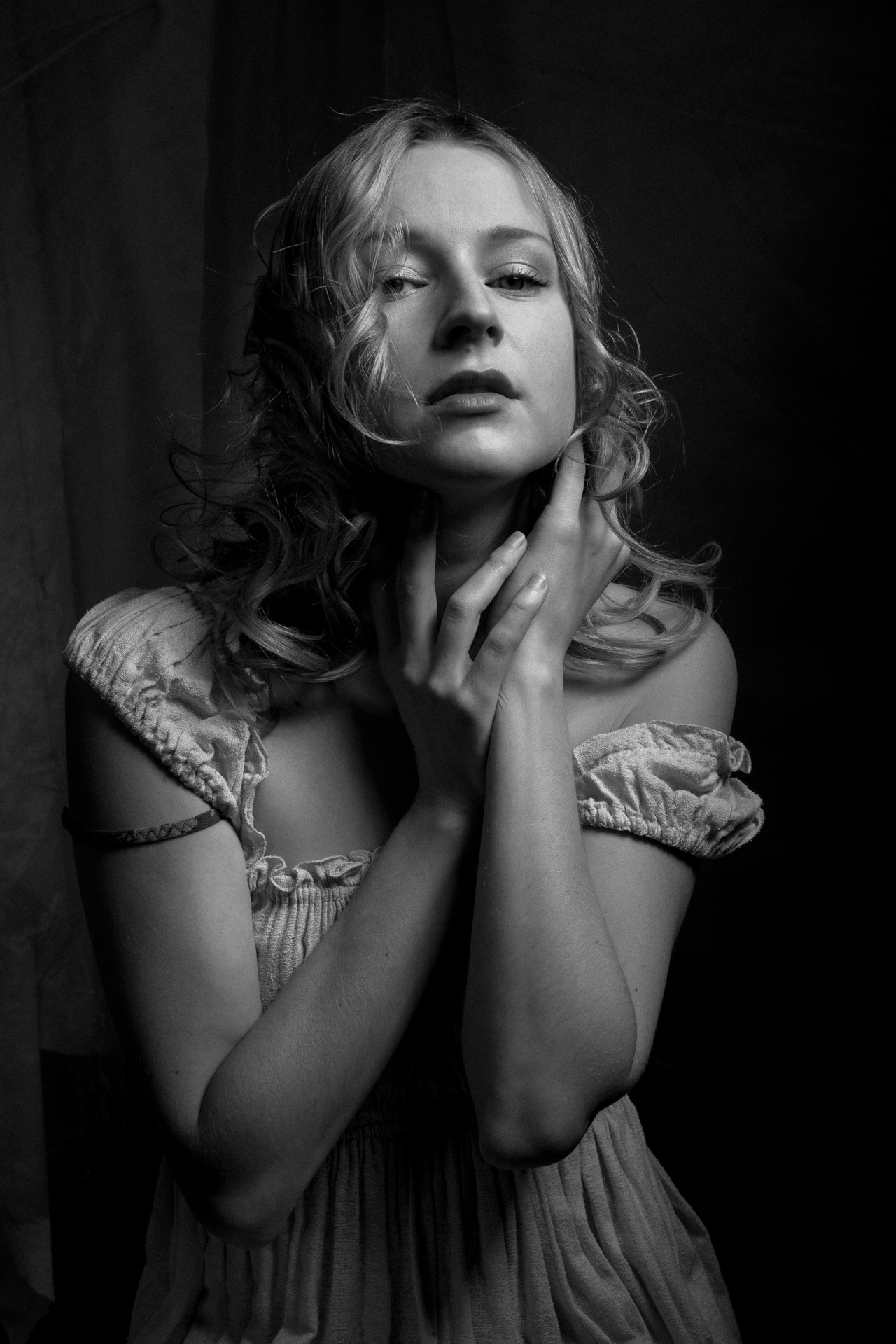
- Olga Medynich in 2009
- Born: Olga Vladimirovna Medynich; 16 December 1981 (age 44); Leningrad, RSFSR, USSR
- Occupations: Actress; parody
- Years active: 2003–present

Olga Vladimirovna Medynich (Russian: Ольга Владимировна Медынич; born 16 December 1981) is a Russian theater, parody, and film actress.

== Biography ==
Olga Medynich was born in Leningrad, Russian SFSR, Soviet Union (now Saint Petersburg, Russia). Olga Medynich graduated from the Saint Petersburg State Theatre Arts Academy in Actress Puppet Theater, the course Nikolai Naumov. She performed in the student plays Biography by Max Frisch and Winter's Tale by William Shakespeare, where she performed the role of Hermione, Pauline, Loss and Time.

In 2003, for the execution of clownery performance Hanger, the actress was awarded the diploma The Muse of St. Petersburg, and a year later won the 2nd prize at the Moscow Variety Contest named after Brunow. After the Winter's Tale Semyon Spivak invited her into the company of the Youth Theatre on the Fontanka, where in 2004 she made her debut in the play Story of Kai and Gerda.

She has been a member of the cast of the Russian sketch shows Women's League and Big Difference. Medynich has also acted in several movies and TV shows.

== Filmography ==
- Big Difference (2008-2014, TV)
- All Inclusive (2011)
- Catherine the Great (2015, TV)
- Life Ahead (2017)
- The Vampires of Midland (2021)
- Matthew Passion (2023)
- Macron (2024)
- Be Gentle with Yourself (2026)
