= Stéphane De Groodt =

Belgian comedian, actor and former racing driver

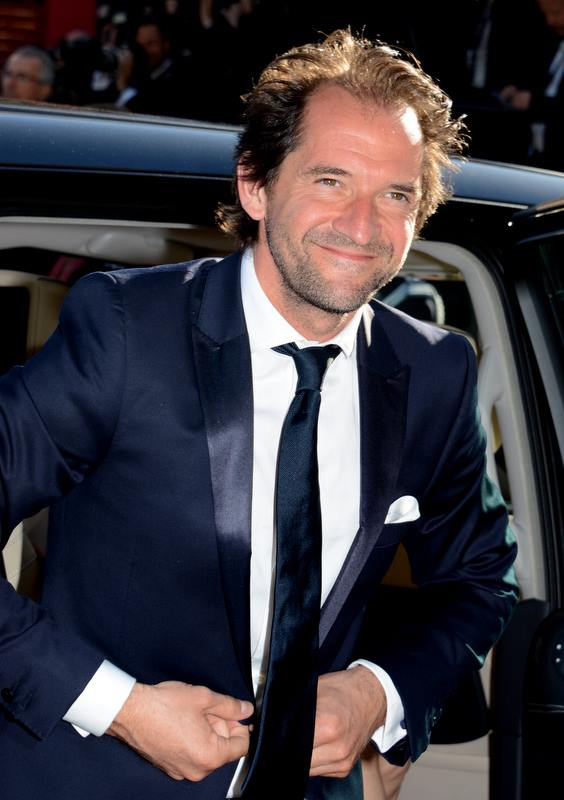
- Stéphane De Groodt at the 2013 Cannes Film Festival
- Born: 3 March 1966 (age 60); Brussels, Belgium
- Occupations: Actor, humorist, racing driver
- Years active: 1997–present (actor)
- Notable credit(s): File dans ta chambre Faux Contact; Boulevard du Palais; Mes amis, mes amours, mes emmerdes... Fais pas ci, fais pas ça
- Height: 5 ft 10 in (1.78 m)

Stéphane De Groodt (born 3 March 1966) is a Belgian comedian, humorist and former racing driver.

== Life and career ==
=== Early life and education ===
Stéphane De Groodt is the son of an engineer at Texaco and a housewife who took care of handicapped children. Dyslexic, he had a chaotic schooling, which soon translated his will towards comedy. He did not obtain any educational degree and decided to become a comedian as well as a racing driver. His parents later bought him a racing driver suit and a crash helmet.

De Groodt then went through several small jobs, including as a barman, journalist, marketing assistant, editor and advertiser, while entering the field of the competition. He did stand-up comedy in the evenings on stage while dedicating the weekends to auto racing.

=== Auto racing career ===
While cooking meals to sell at restaurants, De Groodt attended the auto racing school of La Châtre near Châteauroux where he met the Belgian racing driver Eric van de Poele. He was a professional racing driver from 1985 to 2000, and rose to fame especially with Formula Renault, Formula 3000, Porsche Supercup at the 2001 Spa 24 Hours, and at the Belgian Procar in which he received the title of Champion of Belgium in BMW Compact Cup. In 2000, he left the auto racing competition to become a full-time comedian.

=== Television and radio career ===
De Groodt created the series File dans ta chambre, broadcast since 14 January 2002 on channels RTBF, Canal+ Belgique and France 2, and in which the texts are co-written by his wife Odile d'Oultremont. The series are small episodes in which he portrays Lucien, a totally uncultivated father attempting to answer the questions asked by his 10-year-old son Clovis about a definition or an expression. At the end of every episode, his son answers that he thought it meant something else, which is in fact the real sense of the definition or meaning of the expression. After that, the father does not believe his son and orders him to go to his room, which is the reference to the title of the series.

In September 2012, De Groodt featured every Sunday on the program Le Supplément on Canal+ with Maïtena Biraben, in which he presented a column of a few minutes titled Retour vers le futur. This column functions the same way than the one he presented until 2012 on the program La Matinale on Canal+ and also with Maïtena Biraben and Caroline Roux, where he talked about his meeting with famous characters with a humoristic tune and a mixture of word plays and puns. He also presented a courrier des téléspectateurs (French for "mail of the viewers"), imaginary and funny. He pursued this column weekly on RTL with Stéphane Bern on the radio program À la bonne heure where he commented on fake mail from improbable authors.

In September 2013, after having left RTL, De Groodt joined France Inter on the radio program Comme on nous parle with Pascale Clark every Thursday, where he presented a column of a few minutes titled Mes mails, in which he commented on a number of fake E-mails addressed to France Inter and Pascale Clark.

=== Acting career ===
De Groodt began his acting career playing a number of roles in many television series such as Faux Contact and a recurring role in the French crime series Boulevard du Palais from 1999 to 2007. He then played supporting roles in a number of minor films, but also in well-known films like Asterix at the Olympic Games (2008) and Asterix and Obelix: God Save Britannia (2012). In 2010, he replaced Serge Hazanavicius for the role of the veterinary François Kleber in the series Mes amis, mes amours, mes emmerdes... at the beginning of the second season. In 2013, he played a guest role in the sixth and seventh season of series Fais pas ci, fais pas ça, in which French actress Frédérique Bel also had a recurring role since the fourth season.

De Groodt then played a more important role in the choral comedy Barbecue (2014) alongside Franck Dubosc and Florence Foresti. In 2015, he played his first main role in the comedy-drama Paris-Willouby with Isabelle Carré. Two years later, he played one of the main roles in the romantic comedy L'Un das l'autre (2017) alongside Louise Bourgoin. In 2018, he returned playing in the team comedy Nothing to Hide, which was one of the biggest film successes of the year with nearly two million viewers, and in which he played alongside Bérénice Bejo and the former Miss Météo Doria Tillier.

== Personal life ==
De Groodt married in 2014 the novelist and screenwriter Odile d'Oultremont, with whom he has been since 2000. They are now separated. After having co-written the series File dans ta chambre broadcast on France 2, they continue to collaborate professionally.

== Filmography ==
Film

- Mauvais Genres (2001) ... Pryzuski
- Trois petites filles (2004) ... inspector
- Casablanca Driver (2004) ... patient
- Pour le plaisir (2004) ... café owner
- 25 degrés en hiver (2004) ... working inspector
- Saint-Jacques... La Mecque (2005) ... priest of Navarrenx
- Asterix at the Olympic Games (2008) ... Numéric
- Baby blues (2008) ... Sacha
- Une chaîne pour deux (2008)
- Le Siffleur (2010) ... Martial
- Sans laisser de traces (2010) ... Kazinski
- Asterix and Obelix: God Save Britannia (2012) ... stadium decurion
- Chez nous c'est trois ! (2013) ... Gabriel
- Barbecue (2014) ... Alexandre
- Do Not Disturb (2014) ... Pavel
- Les Gazelles (2014) ... M. Hublot
- Paris-Willouby (2015) ... Maurice Guilby
- Fanny's Journey (2016) ... Jean
- Chacun sa vie et son intime conviction (2017)
- Nothing to Hide (2018) ... Vincent
- The Butcher's Daughter (2021) ... Miguel Amestoy
- Bigbug (2022) ... Max

Television

- Faux Contact (1997–2000) ... adjutant Stéphane Coelenbier
- Boulevard du Palais (1999–2007) ... Pascal Jagot (season 1 to 9)
- Joséphine, ange gardien (Episode : "La vérité en face") (2002) ... The receptionist
- Mon voisin du dessus (TV film) (2003) ... Rémi
- Mon vrai père (TV film) (2004) ... Alain Perini
- Petit Homme (TV film) (2005) ... Grégoire
- Je hais les vacances (TV film) (2007) ... Étienne
- Vive les vacances ! (2009) ... Christophe
- Joséphine, ange gardien (Episode : "Police Blues") (2009) ... Commander Levasseur
- Tombé sur la tête (2010) ... Bertrand
- 35 kilos d'espoir (2010) ... Marc
- Mes amis, mes amours, mes emmerdes... (2010) ... François Kleber
- Merci patron (TV film) (2011) ... François
- Le Sang de la vigne (2013) ... Cluzel (1 episode)
- Fais pas ci, fais pas ça (2013) ... Pierre-Henri Delage (season 6)

== Publications ==
- Stéphane De Groodt; Christophe Debacq (2013). Plon (ed.). Voyages en absurdie (in French). Paris. p. 160. ISBN 978-2-259-22246-4.
- Stéphane De Groodt; Christophe Debacq (2014). Plon (ed.). Retour en absurdie (in French). Paris. p. 200. ISBN 978-2-259-22797-1.
- Stéphane De Groodt (2015). Plon (ed.). Le Livre de la jongle (in French). p. 214. ISBN 978-2-259-24326-1.
- Stéphane De Groodt (2016). Place des éditeurs (ed.). Aller-retour en absurdie (in French). Paris. p. 209. ISBN 978-2-259-25238-6.
- Stéphane De Groodt (2019). Éditions de l'Observatoire (ed.). L'Ivre de mots (in French). Observatoire Editions de l'. p. 237. ISBN 979-10-329-0426-8.
