= Anxious Sunday =

- Directed by: Rudolf Fruntov
- Written by: Boris Medovoy; Rudolf Fruntov; Anatoliy Levitov
- Starring: Klara Luchko; Emmanuil Vitorgan; Aleksandr Belyavsky
- Cinematography: Konstantin Suponitsky
- Music by: Mikhail Ziv
- Production company: Mosfilm
- Release date: 1983
- Running time: 86 minutes
- Country: Soviet Union
- Language: Russian

Anxious Sunday (Russian: Тревожное воскресенье, romanized: Trevozhnoye voskreseniye) is a 1983 disaster film directed by Rudolf Fruntov.

== Plot ==
A Liberian tanker called "Ghent" is moored in the port of a Black Sea city. A repair team is sent to the ship, consisting of three experienced locksmiths and a young trainee, to repair a minor malfunction. During the repair, a fire breaks out aboard the ship that leaves the workers and mechanics trapped in the ship's hold. The locksmiths and the mechanic are experienced men and surround the intern with care and support. When he faints, they gently hold him in their arms. However, the spill of oil threatens to ignite and cause catastrophe for the entire port. To help the local firefighters, a convoy of fire trucks from Belodolsk is dispatched, but the road to it is blocked by a heavy panel truck that has turned over due to a dangerous maneuver performed by the driver.

The Soviet firefighters who arrive have the difficult task of rescuing the men from the ship. The head of the fire detachment, Lieutenant Colonel Chagin, makes a risky decision to blow up the ship's side in order to straighten the dangerous tilt of the ship. The fire is followed by the chairman of the city executive committee, Anna Golovina, whose son is one of the workers trapped in the hold. Having learned about this, she decides not to disclose this but is engaged in the evacuation of children's institutions. Captain Zemtsov, experiencing a family drama, makes his way to the workers locked in the hold. Learning that Golovin is ill, he uses a device and gets on the deck of the ship, but, after being poisoned due to smoke, Captain Zemtsov loses consciousness. He is taken out and taken to the hospital. Chagin pierces the broadside straightening the bank. The arriving Belodolsky convoy begins a successful foam attack, extinguishes the fire on the ship and saves all the blocked workers.

== Cast ==
- Klara Luchko as Anna Golovina, the chairman of the city executive committee
- Emmanuil Vitorgan as Igor Chagin, lieutenant colonel of internal service, chief of the fire brigade
- Aleksandr Belyavsky as Major of Internal Service Istomin, Deputy of Chagin
- Sergey Martynov as Sergey, foreman of ship repair workers
- George Korolchuk as captain Zemtsov
- Ruben Simonov as Karen Maloyan, Port Fire Officer
- Tatyana Tashkova as Tanya Zemtsova
- Tatyana Bozhok as Lena Chagina
- Vsevolod Safonov as Monsieur Marcinel, the captain of the tanker "Gent"
- Sergei Balabanov as Konstantin Vyalikh, son of Golovinoy
- Viktor Zozulin as Paul Namur, tanker mechanic
- Lev Polyakov as Chyolobov, the chief of the port fire protection
- Alexander Yanvaryov as Peter Gontar, ship repairman
- Romualdas Ramanauskas as member of a foreign delegation
- Olga Kataeva as Kira, sergeant of internal service, mistress of Chagin
- Viktor Kosykh as Kolya, ship repairman
- Vladimir Litvinov as navigator of the tanke
- Mikhail Bocharov as on duty at the fire station
- Inna Vykhodtseva as head of a kindergarten
- Daniil Netrebin as Colonel of Internal Service Komigin, Head of the Fire Department of the Department of Internal Affairs
- Olga Sirina as Karen's wife
- Victor Shulgin as episode
