= All Inclusive (2011 film) =

- Directed by: Edouard Radzyukevich
- Written by: Alexander Malenkov
- Produced by: Yuri Minzyanov; Vladislav Ryashin
- Starring: Mikhail Bespalov; Marina Aleksandrova; Nonna Grishayeva; Roman Madyanov; Fyodor Dobronravov
- Cinematography: Denis Panov
- Music by: Arkady Ukupnik
- Production company: Paradise
- Release date: June 9, 2011
- Running time: 93 minutes
- Country: Russia
- Language: Russian
- Box office: $6 103 256

All Inclusive (Russian: All inclusive, или Всё включено!) is a 2011 Russian crime comedy film directed by Edouard Radzyukevich.

== Plot ==
The life of Andrei (Mikhail Bespalov), owner of an expensive and in-demand veterinary clinic for pets in Rublyovka, is a success. Moreover, he is not deprived of attention from beautiful female owners of cute little animals. But a passionate night with oligarch's wife Evelina (Nonna Grishayeva) changes everything: the jealous husband Edik (Roman Madyanov) very intelligibly explains that he will turn the sweet life of the successful businessman upside down. The only way out is to escape from the country. Andrei leaves for Turkey for an all-inclusive resort, not suspecting that it includes much more than seems at first glance. Behind him on the heels follows the German killer Rudolf (Eduard Radzyukevich), and the sunny beaches become the most important test in life.

== Cast ==
- Mikhail Bespalov as Andrey / Veniamin Pyatnitsa
- Marina Aleksandrova as Anna
- Nonna Grishayeva as Evelina
- Roman Madyanov as Eduard Petrovich Budko, the oligarch
- Fyodor Dobronravov as Peter
- Eduard Radziukevich as Rudolf
- Anna Ardova as Galya
- Andrey Kaykov as Borya
- Miroslava Karpovich and Denis Yasik as newlyweds
- Olga Medynich as Natasha
- Maria Deniakina as Marianna Vladimirovna
- Grigory Siyatvinda as Karaduman
- Galina Konshina as woman who keeps repeating: "Valera, I'm here!"
- Eugene Voskresensky as psychiatrist
- Ella Merkulova as Border Guard
- Anton Shavrin as Vitalik
- Elena Shvets as 1st blonde
- Mariya Kiselyova as 2nd blonde
- Petar Zekavitsa as German
- Masha Malinovskaya as Masha (cameo)
- Anfisa Chekhova as Anfisa (cameo)
- Victoria Daineko as Vika (cameo)
- Alexei Ryzhov as member of the group Diskoteka Avariya (cameo)
- Nikolay Timofeev as member of the group Diskoteka Avariya (cameo)
- Alexey Serov as member of the group Diskoteka Avariya (cameo)
