= Nomad (2005 film) =

- Theatrical release poster
- Directed by: Sergei Bodrov; Ivan Passer
- Written by: Rustam Ibragimbekov
- Produced by: Ram Bergman; Pavel Douvidzon; Rustam Ibragimbekov
- Starring: Kuno Becker; Jay Hernandez; Jason Scott Lee; Mark Dacascos
- Cinematography: Dan Laustsen; Ueli Steiger
- Edited by: Ivan Lebedev; Rick Shaine
- Music by: Carlo Siliotto
- Distributed by: The Weinstein Company
- Release dates: November 11, 2005 (Kazakhstan); September 7, 2006 (Russia)
- Running time: 112 minutes
- Countries: Kazakhstan; Russia
- Languages: Russian; Kazakh
- Budget: N/A
- Box office: $3,088,685

Nomad: The Warrior (Kazakh: Көшпенділер, Köşpendiler) is a 2005 Kazakh historical epic film written and co-produced by Rustam Ibragimbekov and directed by Sergei Bodrov and Ivan Passer.

The film had a budget of USD 34 million, which was invested by the government of Kazakhstan to be used in the film production, making it the most expensive Kazakh film ever made. Its production involved approximately 13,000 units of prop weapons, 150 Kazakh and Dzungar yurts, more than 20 principal characters, around 300 supporting roles, and about 2,000 extras. The film’s presentation took place on 6 July 2005 in Astana, with the participation of the President of Kazakhstan, Nursultan Nazarbayev.

It was released on March 16, 2007, in North America, distributed by The Weinstein Company. Two versions of the film were shot: one in Kazakh by Temenov for distribution in Kazakhstan and one in English by Passer and Bodrov for distribution worldwide.

The film was Kazakhstan's official entry for Best Foreign Language Film for the 79th Academy Awards, but it did not make the final shortlist. It was also the last film that Passer directed before his death in 2020.

== Plot ==
Nomad is a historical epic set in 18th-century Kazakhstan. The film is a fictionalized account of the youth and coming-of-age of Ablai Khan, a Khan of the Kazakh Horde, as he grows and fights to defend the fortress at Hazrat-e Turkestan from Dzungar invaders during the Kazakh-Dzungar Wars.

== Cast ==
- Kuno Becker as Mansur
- Jay Hernandez as Erali
- Jason Scott Lee as Oraz the Wise
- Ayan Yesmagambetova as Gaukhar
- Mark Dacascos as Sharish
- Archie Kao as Shangrek
- Tungyshbay Jamanqulov as Abilqair
- Doskhan Joljaqsynov as Galdan Ceren
- Yerik Joljaqsynov as Barak
- Dilnaz Akhmadieva as Hocha
- Aziz Beishenaliev as Ragbat

== Release dates ==
The Kazakh language version of Nomad premiered in Kazakhstan on 6 July 2005.

The film was released in the United States on March 16, 2007 (limited release) and March 30, 2007 (wide release).

І том “Алмас қылыш” (баспа “Шығыс-Батыс”, София, 2006)

ІІ том “Жанталас” (баспа “Шығыс-Батыс”, София, 2007)

ІІІ том “Хан Кене” (баспа “Шығыс-Батыс”, София, 2008)

== Reception ==
=== Critical response ===
Nomad has an approval rating of 6% on review aggregator website Rotten Tomatoes, based on 16 reviews, and an average rating of 4.4/10. On Metacritic, the film has a weighted average score of 49 out of 100, based on 7 critics, indicating "mixed or average reviews".

Variety critic Leslie Felperin, who viewed the film at the Locarno Film Festival wrote that, "nearly every tenge (Kazakhstan's local currency) and euro from French-based co-production partner Wild Bunch is visible on screen, judging by pic's elaborate costumes, sets and cast of a thousand or so — real people not digitally generated extras", and that co-directors "Passer and Bodrov, assisted by (per credits) 'local director' Talgat Temenov, have enough skill to make Nomad compelling by dint of old-school sincerity and sheer spectacle. [...] [the cast shows] the necessary displays of athletic prowess and toothsome looks, particularly from the virile Becker".

In the United States, it was a box office bomb, as the film was only able to scrape $79,123. While most of the critics enjoyed the cinematography and the action scenes, they criticized the film for rudimentary acting, confused directing and, for some critics who saw the English version, poor dubbing. The critics especially noted that the film had very poor screenwriting, for lines such as a scene between Mansur (Kuno Becker) and Gauhar (Ayan Yesmagambetova):
Mansur: 'You have the scent of the moon.'
Gauhar: 'Does the moon have a scent?'

=== Awards and nominations ===
In addition to being Kazakhstan's entry in the race for the Academy Award for Best Foreign Language Film, Carlo Siliotto received a Golden Globe Award nomination for Best Original Score.

== See also ==
- List of most expensive non-English language films
- List of historical drama films of Asia
- Ten Great Campaigns
- Dzungar Khanate
- Kazakh Khanate
- Kazakh-Dzungar Wars
- List of submissions to the 79th Academy Awards for Best Foreign Language Film
- List of Kazakhstani submissions for the Academy Award for Best Foreign Language Film
