= Intimate Strangers (2018 film) =

- Theatrical release poster
- Hangul: 완벽한 타인
- Hanja: 完璧한 他人
- RR: Wanbyeokhan tain
- MR: Wanbyŏkhan t'ain
- Directed by: Lee Jae-kyoo
- Written by: Bae Se-young
- Produced by: Lee Yong-nam; Park Chul-soo; Park Jun-seo
- Starring: Yoo Hae-jin; Cho Jin-woong; Lee Seo-jin; Yum Jung-ah; Kim Ji-soo; Song Ha-yoon; Yoon Kyung-ho
- Cinematography: Kim Sung-an
- Edited by: Shin Min-kyung
- Music by: Mowg
- Production companies: Film Monster Co. Drama House
- Distributed by: Lotte Entertainment
- Release date: 31 October 2018
- Running time: 116 minutes
- Country: South Korea
- Language: Korean
- Budget: ₩5.8 billion
- Box office: US$39.7 million

Intimate Strangers is a 2018 South Korean comedy-drama film directed by Lee Jae-kyoo and written by Bae Se-young, based on the 2016 Italian film Perfect Strangers. It features an ensemble cast that includes Yoo Hae-jin, Cho Jin-woong, Lee Seo-jin, Yum Jung-ah, Kim Ji-soo, Song Ha-yoon and Yoon Kyung-ho. The film was released in South Korea on 31 October 2018.

== Plot summary ==
Lifelong friends and married couple Seok-ho and Ye-jin, invite their close friends over for a housewarming dinner. They end up playing a game where they must share all new incoming messages and calls on their cell phones. Initially starting lightly, the game gets more and more uncomfortable as hidden truths start to surface, making them start to feel more like strangers.

== Cast ==
- Yoo Hae-jin as Tae-soo
- Cho Jin-woong as Seok-ho
- Lee Seo-jin as Joon-mo
- Yum Jung-ah as Soo-hyun, Tae-soo's wife
- Kim Ji-soo as Ye-jin, Seok-ho's wife
- Song Ha-yoon as Se-kyung, Joon-mo's wife
- Yoon Kyung-ho as Young-bae
- Ji Woo as So-young, Seok-ho and Ye-jin's daughter

=== Special appearance ===
- Lee Soon-jae as Young-bae's father (voice)
- Ra Mi-ran as Kim So-wol (voice)
- Jo Jung-suk as Yeon-woo (voice)
- Kim Min-kyo as Min-soo (voice)
- Jo Dal-hwan as Det. Kang Kyung-joon (voice)
- Lee Do-kyung as Ye-jin's father (voice)
- Jin Seon-kyu as Facebook's guy (voice)
- Choi Yu-hwa as Chae-young (voice)
- Jung Suk-young as Joon-mo's friend (voice)

== Production ==
Principal photography began on 27 December 2017 and concluded on 12 February 2018.

== Release ==
Intimate Strangers was released on 31 October 2018, alongside Hollywood films Bohemian Rhapsody, Halloween and The House with a Clock in Its Walls. On 6 November 2018, the film was reported to have been sold to 44 territories, with release dates in Australia and New Zealand on 8 November, the United States on 9 November, and Singapore on 22 November.

== Reception ==
=== Critical response ===
Yoon Min-sik from The Korea Herald gave a mixed review and wrote, "Though it starts off dull, the film quickly heats up -- both in terms of fun and drama. This is largely due to quality acting from most of the cast. The mundane lines seemed generic, and the characters were stereotypical. However, these were small problems compared with how the film ended, which left me feeling confused about how I felt about the film."

=== Box office ===
The film topped the local box office during its opening day, attracting 273,972 attendees with US$1.5 million gross, the biggest opening day for a 2018 comedy. On 3 November, the film surpassed 1 million admissions, the fastest comedy to hit the milestone in 2018. The film surpassed its break-even point at 1.8 million admissions on 5 November.

During its opening weekend, the film topped the local box office with US$9.3 million gross from 1,173,171 attendees, leaving Bohemian Rhapsody in second place. It is the second biggest opening weekend for a local 2018 film, behind Along with the Gods: The Last 49 Days. On 6 November, the film surpassed 2 million admissions, becoming the third fastest local 2018 film to surpass the milestone.

As of 30 December 2018, the film grossed US$39.7 million from 5,292,649 total attendance.

== See also ==
- Perfect Strangers (2017), Spanish remake of Perfect Strangers
- Nothing to Hide (2018), French remake of Perfect Strangers
- Loud Connection (2019), Russian remake of Perfect Strangers
