= Be Gentle with Yourself =

- Directed by: Ivan Kitaev
- Written by: Darya Gratsevich; Olga Primachenko
- Based on: Love yourself tender. A book about self-appreciation and self-care by Olga Primachenko
- Produced by: Olga Filipuk; Darya Gratsevich; Darya Kaplya; Vladimir Maslov
- Starring: Karina Razumovskaya; Artyom Tkachenko; Alisa Konashenkova; Olga Medynich; Pelageya Nevzorova; Lyudmila Artemeyva; Leonid Bichevin
- Cinematography: Maksim Smirnov
- Music by: Aleksandr Kamensky
- Production companies: Plus Studio; Zoom Production
- Distributed by: Cinema Atmosphere
- Release date: March 5, 2026 (Russia)
- Running time: 108 minutes
- Country: Russia
- Language: Russian

Be Gentle with Yourself, also known as Love Yourself Tender (Russian: К себе нежно) is a 2026 Russian romantic comedy-drama film directed by Ivan Kitaev, it's an adaptation of Olga Primachenko's bestseller of the same name about the importance of bringing order to one's inner world.

This film was theatrically released on March 5, 2026, by Cinema Atmosphere Film Distribution.

== Plot ==
Nadya is a highly qualified otolaryngologist, but by the age of forty, she realizes she barely knows herself. At work, she studies her patients' senses every day, but it's as if she's stopped perceiving her own emotions, or has never truly heard them.

Two years ago, her husband, Boris, left her, unable to cope with the monotony of their lives, but the divorce was never finalized. Nadya is raising her daughter, Olivia, and still lives in her mother-in-law's apartment.

She needs change: it will help her see that the world is full of love. Six "lessons of tenderness" appear in Nadya's life—each one will be a step toward finding herself, reclaiming her voice, and the birth of new hope.

== Cast ==
- Karina Razumovskaya as Nadya, an otolaryngologist
- Artyom Tkachenko as Boris, Nadya's ex-husband
- Alisa Konashenkova as Olivia, Nadya's daughter
- Olga Medynich as Dasha, Nadya's boss
- Pelageya Nevzorova as Vita, Nadya's friend
- Lyudmila Artemeyva as Tamara, Boris's mother, Nadya's mother-in-law
- Leonid Bichevin as Vyacheslav
- Aleksandra Veleskevich as a hotel employee
- Elena Makhova as a patient
- Vladislav Tsenyov as a swimming coach
- Vasily Brichenko as Kostya
- Denis Rubin as a veterinary clinic administrator
- Anna Yeshchenko as Nadezhda
- Marta Nosova as a yoga instructor
- Anton Lebedev as a waiter
- Olga Primachenko as a customer
- Pavel Nagay as Dima

== Production ==
The film Be Gentle with Yourself was produced by the film companies "Plus Studio" and "Zoom Production", together with the publishing house "Eksmo".

In September 2023, the Plus Studio film company and Yandex Production Center announced their intention to adapt Olga Primachenko's hit book Love yourself tender. A book about self-appreciation and self-care (2020). The film rights were transferred to the film company. Throughout all stages of production, editors from Eksmo Publishing House and the book's author oversaw the film and assisted with the script. During filming, the filmmakers partially worked in the Krasnodar Krai, using urban and natural locations in the region.

=== Casting ===
Olga Primachenko not only served as the project's literary consultant but also played a small cameo role. She also narrated the therapeutic podcast Be Gentle with Yourself, which the characters listen to.

=== Filming ===
Filming began in August 2025 and took place in the Krasnodar Krai.
