= Paris-Willouby =

- Theatrical release poster
- Directed by: Arthur Delaire; Quentin Reynaud
- Written by: Arthur Delaire; Quentin Reynaud; Baya Kasmi (collaboration)
- Produced by: Xavier Rigault; Marc-Antoine Robert
- Starring: Isabelle Carré; Stéphane De Groodt; Alex Lutz
- Cinematography: Yannick Ressigeac
- Edited by: Anita Roth
- Production company: 2.4.7. Films
- Distributed by: Mars Films
- Release dates: 26 August 2015 (Angoulême); 20 January 2016 (France)
- Running time: 83 minutes
- Country: France
- Language: French
- Budget: $4.6 million
- Box office: $378.000

Paris-Willouby is a 2015 French dramatic comedy film written and directed by Arthur Delaire and Quentin Reynaud in their directorial debut. The film stars Isabelle Carré, Stéphane De Groodt and Alex Lutz.

== Plot ==
A blended family set off on a road trip for a funeral.

== Cast ==
- Isabelle Carré as Claire Lacourt
- Stéphane De Groodt as Maurice Guilby
- Alex Lutz as Marc Lacourt
- Joséphine Japy as Lucie Guilby
- Solal Forte as Alexandre le Tallec
- Aminthe Audiard as Prune Guilby
- Jennifer Decker as Angélique
- Daniel Hanssens as Human Resources VP
- Maëva Youbi as Julie Duché
- Guy Marchand as Police officer 1
- Quentin Reynaud as Police officer 2
- Arthur Delaire as receptionist
- Jean-Benoît Ugeux as the priest
