= Paragraph 78 =

- Film poster
- Directed by: Mikhail Khleborodov
- Written by: Mikhail Khleborodov (screenplay); Ivan Okhlobystin (novel)
- Produced by: Yusup Bahshiev
- Starring: Gosha Kutsenko; Vladimir Vdovichenko; Anastasia Slanevskaya
- Cinematography: Sergey Kozlov
- Music by: Tobias Enhus
- Distributed by: MB Productions; Central Partnership
- Release dates: 22 February 2007 (Part I); 29 March 2007 (Part II)
- Running time: 95 minutes (part I); 90 minutes (part II)
- Country: Russia
- Language: Russian

Paragraph 78 (Russian: Параграф 78, romanized: Paragraf 78; also stylized as: § 78) is a Russian film by Mikhail Khleborodov released in 2007. The film was split into two parts Paragraph 78, Punkt 1 released on February 22, 2007, and Paragraph 78, Punkt 2 released on March 29, 2007. The screenplay was based on a 1995 story by Ivan Okhlobystin. Andrey Lazarchuk, the Russian writer of the modern turborealism literature style, wrote a novel based on this film (February 2007).

== Plot ==
The movie is set a future where soft drugs are legalized, Bowling is Olympic sport, and countries such as the Asian Union and the United Pan-American States have appeared. An assault group under the command of Gudvin (Gosha Kutsenko) breaks apart because of his conflict with Skif (Vladimir Vdovichenkov).

Five years later Lisa (Anastasiya Slanevskaya) has left Skif and is married to Gudvin. Russia, the Asian Union and The United Pan-American States have signed a disarmament treaty, but keep a close watch one another.

A state of emergency is declared at one of Russia's secret and, per international treaties, prohibited laboratories on an island in the Arctic Ocean, causing an emergency beacon to begin broadcasting, creating the risk of discovery by the other nations. To prevent this from happening, Gudvin assembles his former group. By that time Spam (Anatoliy Beliy) is jailed, Luba (Stanislav Duzhnikov) works in that same prison as a warden, Festival (Grigory Siyatvinda) is engaged in commerce of banned drugs (lysergic acid), Pai (Aziz Beishenaliev) works in a casino, and Skif ruins himself with drink.

Together they depart to that island to penetrate the base and stop the emergency beacon.

== Cast ==
- Gosha Kutsenko as Gudvin
- Vladimir Vdovichenkov as Skif
- Grigory Siyatvinda as Festival
- Anastasiya Slanevskaya as Lisa
- Stanislav Duzhnikov as Luba
- Aziz Beishenaliev as Pai
- Anatoliy Beliy as Spam
- Yusup Bakshiyev as Doktor
- Mikhail Yefremov as Prison commander

== Critics ==
- The film was heavily criticised for a strong resemblance to a number of films, including Resident Evil, Doom, Phantom Force, Dragon Fighter and Aliens.
- The film was heavily packed by product placement as the recent Russian films Night Watch and Day Watch. This includes Russian Channel One, Fan chips, Men's Health magazine, Pikador ketchup, Mail.ru service, Radio Maximum, Golden barrel beer, Grand Prix vodka, Wrigley's Spearmint, Qtek S110, Creative player, Panasonic notebook, etc.
