= Matthew Passion (film) =

- Theatrical release poster
- Directed by: Sergey Ilin
- Written by: Sergey Ilin; Igor Rybin
- Produced by: Ivan Kapitonov; Svyatoslav Podgayevsky; Georgy Shabanov; Tatyana Serebrennikova; Margarita Migranova; Eduard Iloyan
- Starring: Denis Vlasenko; Valeriia "Valeri" Zoidova; Timofey Tribuntsev; Aleksey Rozin; Olga Medynich
- Cinematography: Duglas Machabeli
- Music by: Ivan Sintsov
- Production companies: QS Films; START Studio; Yellow, Black and White; Channel One; STS; Ministry of Culture
- Distributed by: National Media Group Film Distribution
- Release date: October 19, 2023 (Russia)
- Running time: 120 minutes
- Country: Russia
- Language: Russian
- Budget: ₽60 million
- Box office: ₽80 million; $877.696

Matthew Passion (Russian: Страсти по Матвею, romanized: Strasti po Matveyu) is a 2023 Russian coming-of-age romantic comedy drama film written and directed by Sergey Ilin. Young stars Denis Vlasenko and Valeriia Zoidova in a touching love story between a young altar boy and a daring artist.

Matthew Passion was theatrically released in Russia on October 19, 2023, by National Media Group Film Distribution.

== Plot ==
Matthew is a young man who dreams of becoming a good priest, following in his father’s footsteps, but for now, he diligently performs the duties of an altar server. His father expects him to marry soon, a necessary step before ordination, but his girlfriend Liza refuses to become a "matushka" (priest's wife). Despite efforts, including an attempt at using an Orthodox dating service, Matthew’s search for a suitable partner proves challenging.

One day, Matthew meets Agatha, a daring and spontaneous artist hired to paint icons in the church, who has little connection to the church or its teachings. Though their personalities and values appear incompatible, they develop a deep and unexpected bond. Their relationship, however, is tested by Agatha’s controlling boyfriend, Robert, and Matthew’s struggles with the expectations of his family and faith.

At Agatha’s birthday party, Matthew takes a public stand against Robert’s treatment of her, leading to a series of events that bring the two closer. Agatha even dyes her hair green in a moment of rebellion, pushing Matthew further from his father’s strict path. Attempting to meet his father’s expectations, Matthew asks Agatha to pose as his fiancée, but this ruse quickly unravels, resulting in her dismissal from the church.

When Matthew learns that Agatha is under pressure to consider an abortion, he is torn between his feelings for her and his religious convictions. In a climactic moment, he rushes to the hospital to express his love and belief in the sanctity of their unborn child. Although Agatha cannot hear his words, she sees his devotion. About a year later, Matthew, still serving as an altar server, sees Agatha again in church, where she shows him her newborn from afar, signaling the silent yet powerful connection they still share.

== Cast ==
- Denis Vlasenko as Matthew Tikhomirov (also tr. Matvey Tikhomirov), an altar boy
- Valeriia "Valeri" Zoidova as Agatha (also tr. Agata), a tattoo artist
- Timofey Tribuntsev as Theodore (also tr. Fyodor), a priest
- Aleksey Rozin as John (also tr. Ioann), Matthew's father
- Olga Medynich as Anna, Matthew's mother
- Anar Khalilov as Major Robert, a young millionaire
- Olga Bodrova as Barbara (also tr. Varvara)
- Aleksandr Mizev as Cyrus (also tr. Kir)
- Valeria Chelovechkova as Liza
- Katerina Kuchma as Maria
- Mikhail Orlov as Misha
- Ekaterina Novokreshchenova as Sasha
- Vasilisa Semashkova as Svetlana
- Ivan Kravchenko plays himself as a bartender

== Production ==
The film marks the directorial debut of Sergey Ilin. In an interview, Ilin mentioned that he drew upon personal impressions from his youth, infusing the film with authenticity. The script was written by Igor Rybin, and the creators aimed to portray the life of an Orthodox community within modern society, addressing the real-world issues faced by parishioners.

The film crew, led by Ilin, visited over 200 churches across the Moscow Oblast and Moscow, seeking locations that would enhance the film's realism.

=== Casting ===
Particular attention was given to ensuring the authenticity of the priests' behavior and character portrayals. Actors Aleksey Rozin and Timofey Tribuntsev participated in rehearsals specifically designed to bring their characters closer to the everyday lives of Orthodox clergy.

== Release ==
The premiere screening of the film Matthew Passion took place on October 11, 2023 at the capital’s Khudozhestvenny cinema. The film was presented by the leading actors. The wide release took place on October 19, 2023.
