= Story of One Appointment =

2018 film directed by Dunya Smirnova

- Directed by: Avdotya Smirnova
- Written by: Pavel Basinsky; Anna Parmas; Avdotya Smirnova
- Produced by: Oksana Barkovskaya; Anatoly Chubais; Sergey Selyanov
- Starring: Aleksey Smirnov; Filipp Gurevich; Yevgeny Kharitonov; Irina Gorbacheva; Lukasz Simlat
- Cinematography: Maksim Osadchy
- Edited by: Yulia Batalova
- Music by: Basta; Aleksey Golubenko
- Production company: STV Film Company
- Distributed by: WDSSPR
- Release date: 6 September 2018
- Running time: 112 min.
- Country: Russia
- Language: Russian

Story of one Appointment (Russian: История одного назначения, romanized: Istoriya odnogo naznacheniya) is a Russian historical drama film directed by Avdotya Smirnova. It stars Aleksey Smirnov, Yevgeny Kharitonov and Irina Gorbacheva. The premiere of the film in Russia was on 6 September 2018.

== Plot ==
In the Tula Oblast's infantry regiment, a place where the high-ranking officer, Lieutenant Grigory Kolokoltsev serves, a heinous crime takes place. Following a thorough investigation, a soldier is identified as the culprit and subsequently brought before a drumhead court-martial to face trial and, ultimately, execution.

Driven by his strong conviction in progressive ideals, Lieutenant Kolokoltsev is determined to seek help from an unexpected source – none other than Count Tolstoy. Deeply moved by the impassioned plea for justice, Count Tolstoy commits himself wholeheartedly to the cause, vowing to fight tirelessly to protect the innocent soldier from the clutches of an unfair and unjust destiny.

== Cast ==
- Aleksey Smirnov as Grigory Kolokoltsev
- Filipp Gurevich as Vasily Shabunin
- Yevgeny Kharitonov as Leo Tolstoy
- Irina Gorbacheva as Sophia Tolstaya
- Lukasz Simlat as Kazimir Yacevich
- Sergey Umanov as Aleksandr Matveyevich Stasyulevich
- Elizaveta Yankovskaya as Tatyana Andreevna Bers
- Alexei Makarov as Sergey Tolstoy
- Anna Mikhalkova as Anna Ivanovna
- Igor Zolotovitsky as Nikolay Ilyich
- Andrey Smirnov as Apollon Kolokoltsev
- Gennady Smirnov as Pyotr

== Awards ==
- Sochi Open Russian Film Festival: Best Screenplay, People's Choice Award
- Sakhalin International Film Festival: Audience Choice Grand Prix
- Golden Eagle Award: Best Screenplay
- Nika Award: Best Screenplay
