= Vasily Utkin =

Russian journalist and sports reporter (1972–2024)

- Василий Уткин
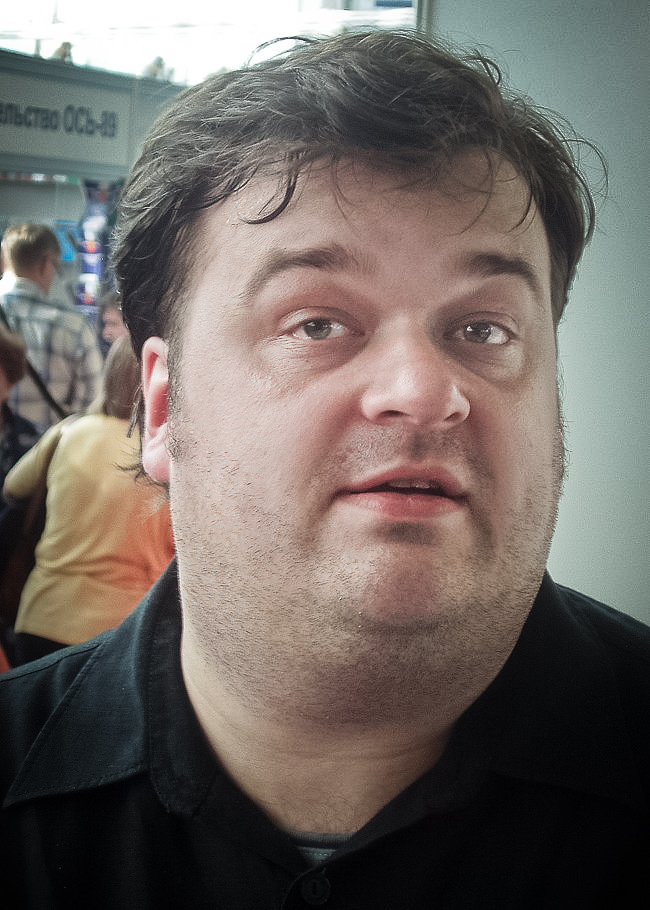
- Utkin in 2008
- Born: 6 March 1972; Balashikha, Moscow Oblast, Soviet Union
- Died: 19 March 2024 (aged 52); Moscow, Russia
- Occupations: Sports commentator; journalist; author

Vasily Vyacheslavovich Utkin (Russian: Василий Вячеславович Уткин; 6 March 1972 – 19 March 2024) was a Russian sports commentator and reporter, author, host, television and radio presenter, entertainer, and actor.

He gained popularity in the mid-1990s as a football commentator for NTV and NTV Plus and as a sports journalist, hosting the TV program The Football Club, which he released on his own YouTube channel until the last days of his life. Winner of the TEFI award in the category "Best Sports Commentator" in 2004 and 2005.

From 1 September 2010 to 31 August 2015, he was editor-in-chief of NTV Plus sports channels. From 2014 to 2015, he hosted the entertainment game show Big Question on the STS. From 1 November 2015 to 5 February 2016, he was an employee of Match TV. From 3 March 2016 to 13 May 2017, he was a commentator for Eurosport.

He was former co-owner of Sports.ru website. As an actor he collaborated with Kvartet I. He was the owner of the media football club Egrisi.

According to a number of colleagues, players, and the media, Utkin created the language and identity of modern sports journalism in Russia, and was the most talented and recognizable Russian-speaking football commentator of his time.

== Career ==
Utkin was appointed chief editor of the sports channels of NTV Plus on 1 September 2010, and was in place until the restructuring to Match TV.

Utkin left Match TV after refusing to work with Tina Kandelaki in 2015. In 2020, his views on the poor governance of Russia were attacked by television host Vladimir Solovyov.

Utkin was also known for his shocking actions and statements, some even causing international scandals.

Utkin was assaulted twice in his career for outspoken views, in 2001 and 2019. The latter he linked to former Russia national team head coach Stanislav Cherchesov.

Utkin was also an occasional actor who played the part of a candidate for Governor Igor Tsaplin in Kvartet I's play Election Day and follow-up movies Election Day (2007) and Election Day 2 (2016).

Even though he did not strongly oppose the Russian annexation of Crimea, in 2022, he spoke out against Russian invasion of Ukraine.

== Death ==
Vasily Utkin died at the Pirogov Hospital in Moscow, on 19 March 2024, at the age of 52. The preliminary cause of death was a pulmonary embolism. At the time of his death, 6-foot-7-inch-tall (201 cm) Utkin weighed more than 440 pounds (200 kg).

On 21 March, before the start of a friendly football match between the Russian and the Serbian national team, fans honored the memory of the commentator with a minute of silence.
