= Don't Play the Fool... =

Не валяй дурака
- Directed by: Valeri Chikov
- Produced by: Aleksei Shachnev
- Starring: Mikhail Yevdokimov; Lev Durov; Valeri Zolotukhin
- Cinematography: Timur Zelma
- Edited by: Galina Dyakonova
- Music by: Konstantin Shevelyov
- Release date: 1997
- Running time: 97 minutes
- Country: Russia
- Languages: Russian, English, Japanese

Don't Play the Fool ... (Russian: Не валяй дурака...) is a Russian comedy film by Valeri Chikov. It shows unlight relations between the USSR and the United States after the Cold War, with a tragicomic side.

== Plot ==
The action takes place simultaneously in the Russian North, the United States, and Moscow in the early to mid-1990s[* 1]. The Americans decide to make sure that there really is a diamond deposit in the area of the Arkhangelsk village of Krasny Serp, and send there a submarine under the command of a black veteran (Kevin McGuire), who in his youth accompanied Allied convoys during World War II. At the same time, in the village of Krasny Serp, the blacksmith Filimon (Mikhail Evdokimov) and his friend, the clerk Pasha Gus (Sergei Agapitov), quarrel over a bullet-riddled hat, and the chairman Petya Khorkov (Yuri Olennikov) calls a rally with a proposal to return the village to its pre-revolutionary name of Mindyukino (the period of collectivization in the USSR). In addition, the long-awaited TV repairman (Sergei Rubeko) arrives in the village. Having fixed the TV in Filimon's house, the TV repairman goes to Ivan Tarataikin (Valery Zolotukhin) and, while doing the repairs, asks why Filimon's son Vasya (Grigory Siyatvinda) is black. Ivan tells the story of the birth of Polina (Olga Ostroumova), Filimon's wife.

As a diversionary tactic, the Americans throw a 200-liter barrel of alcohol to the shore, and Filimon soon fishes it out. In a few minutes, a group of men gathers in Filimon's barn, and Zina Tarataikina (Tatyana Kravchenko) runs in there looking for her husband. At her suggestion, the village decides to hold a folk festival, in which, against their will, all the American submariners gradually become involved. As is customary for such festivals, there is a mass brawl and a fire (the huge barn belonging to Filimon, where the festival was taking place, burns down). And the black veteran (he also landed on the shore) found his daughter and grandson, born in the family of Filimon.

Having noticed suspicious activity of the American submarine in the area of the Kola Peninsula (which even made news on TV), Lubyanka begins an investigation. In the neighboring village of Khomutovo, fishermen also caught a barrel, but one of them was afraid that it might contain biological weapons and called the police. The barrel was sent to Moscow by plane (accompanied by a "TV repairman" who came to the village, who turned out to be an FSB captain), and there, after analyzing the contents, they found out that it contained ordinary alcohol, only American-made. Having realized what was going on[4], the FSB sends special forces to the village of Krasny Serp by helicopter, but the Americans safely sail away.

Filimon appears in court, where he is convicted under Article 206 of the Criminal Code of Russia[5] for causing unrest in the village, which prevented anyone from going to work, stopped the work of the farm and the machine shop, and stopped milking the cows. He is sentenced to 2 years of suspended imprisonment and is required to reimburse the cost of 200 liters of alcohol to the local winery (as it turned out, the factory actually lost a barrel during transportation (it was caught by Filimon), and the "American" barrel floated further downstream and was caught in Khomutovo). The verdict caused indignation among the residents of Krasny Serp, especially the obligation to reimburse the damage to the winery. Pasha makes peace with Filimon and promises to deliver the two liters of vodka he lost his bet on after the bathhouse.

After the trial, Filimon catches firewood and catches another barrel of alcohol, this time thrown in by Japanese submariners.

In the epilogue, the voice-over narrator reports that the following summer Polina visited her father in America, and Filimon was not allowed in because of his criminal record, Ivan Tarataikin died while testing his helicopter. Milkmaid Klava (Anastasia Zavolokina) married Petya Khorkov and gave birth to triplets. Pasha also works in the office, recently he stepped on a nail again and is on sick leave, and the village of Krasny Serp was renamed Mindyukino.

== Cast ==
The cast of the film:

- Mikhail Yevdokimov as Filimon
- Lev Durov as Grandfather
- Valeri Zolotukhin as Vanya Taratakin
- Olga Ostroumova as Polina
- Vladimir Kashpur as General
- Semyon Altov as member of Expedition
- Valeri Chikov
- Grigory Siyatvinda as Vasya
- Tatyana Kravchenko as Zina
- Alexander Pyatkov as Kutusov
- Sergei Agapitov as Pashka Goos
- Yuri Oleinikov
- Andrei Nikolaev
- Alexander Wigdorov
- Scott Kinninhaim
- Austin Ti Smot
- Kevin McGuire
