= Forsaken (2018 film) =

- Directed by: Aleksandr Kulikov
- Written by: Mikhail Raskhodnikov; Olga Rashodnikova; Aleksey Petrukhin
- Produced by: Aleksandr Karpov
- Starring: Andrey Smolyakov; Anna Banshchikova; Maksim Vitorgan; Grigory Siyatvinda; Yuriy Tsurilo; Aleksandr Kulikov; Yevgeniya Shipova
- Cinematography: Sergey Pavlov
- Edited by: Ilya Andrashnikov
- Music by: Sergey Dudakov; Sergey Nemirovskiy
- Production companies: Muravey Production; Russian Film Group; Soyuz Marins Group
- Distributed by: Luxor Film
- Release date: November 8, 2018
- Running time: 91 minutes
- Country: Russia
- Language: Russian

Forsaken (Russian: Пришелец, literally "Extraterrestrial"), a.k.a. Forsaken: Mission Mars, Mission Mars and Stranded On Mars, is a 2018 Russian science fiction psychological thriller directed by Aleksandr Kulikov. Originally known as "Martian", the movie bears striking similarities to Ridley Scott's 2015 film, and, despite having a different ending, was heavily criticized in Russia and worldwide. It received generally negative reviews.

== Plot ==
In the near-distant future, a space expedition consisting of four astronauts is sent to Mars by Roscosmos. Three of the crewmembers return to Earth, leaving their captain, Alexander Chapaev, alone on Mars. He starts counting his days on the planet, aided only by a still working radio communication with Earth, as well as a robotic drone to keep him company. On Earth, all efforts to bring Alexander back home turn into quarrels between the government and the space agency, until a private investor proposes his help. However, it soon turns out to be a hoax, since the company sending Alexander subsistence for survival decides to turn his broadcast into a reality show, and is not interested in getting the astronaut back to Earth at all. Bereft of his family, Chapaev starts having mind-boggling hallucinations and meets an entity who is revealed to be a sentient Mars lifeform. The film ends with Chapaev not knowing what is real and unreal anymore, while it is hinted that the whole mission was staged only to raise TV ratings among viewers.

== Cast ==
- Andrey Smolyakov as Aleksandr Kovalyov
- Anna Banshchikova as Anna
- Maksim Vitorgan as Pyotr Novikov
- Grigory Siyatvinda as Grisha Star
- Yuriy Tsurilo as Alexey Alexeyevich
- Aleksandr Kulikov as Aleksandr Chapaev
- Yevgeniya Shipova as news correspondent
- Boris Moiseev as Roman Randolf
- Maksim Surayev as Maksim Surayev

== Reception ==
The film was a clear box office bomb, grossing only around 15 million Russian rubles ($206,000 US) on a 350 million ruble ($4,800,000 US) budget. It was considered the worst-grossing movie in Russian film history, until it was surpassed by Spitak within the same year. Fond Kino released a statement in 2019 in which it officially apologized for having allocated taxpayer income money for the production of this film. In Russia, this is not the first time a federal body has allocated taxpayer money for movies that bomb at the box office, and the gesture itself is infamously considered by Russians to be a part of government corruption.
