= Grigory Siyatvinda =

Russian actor (born 1970)

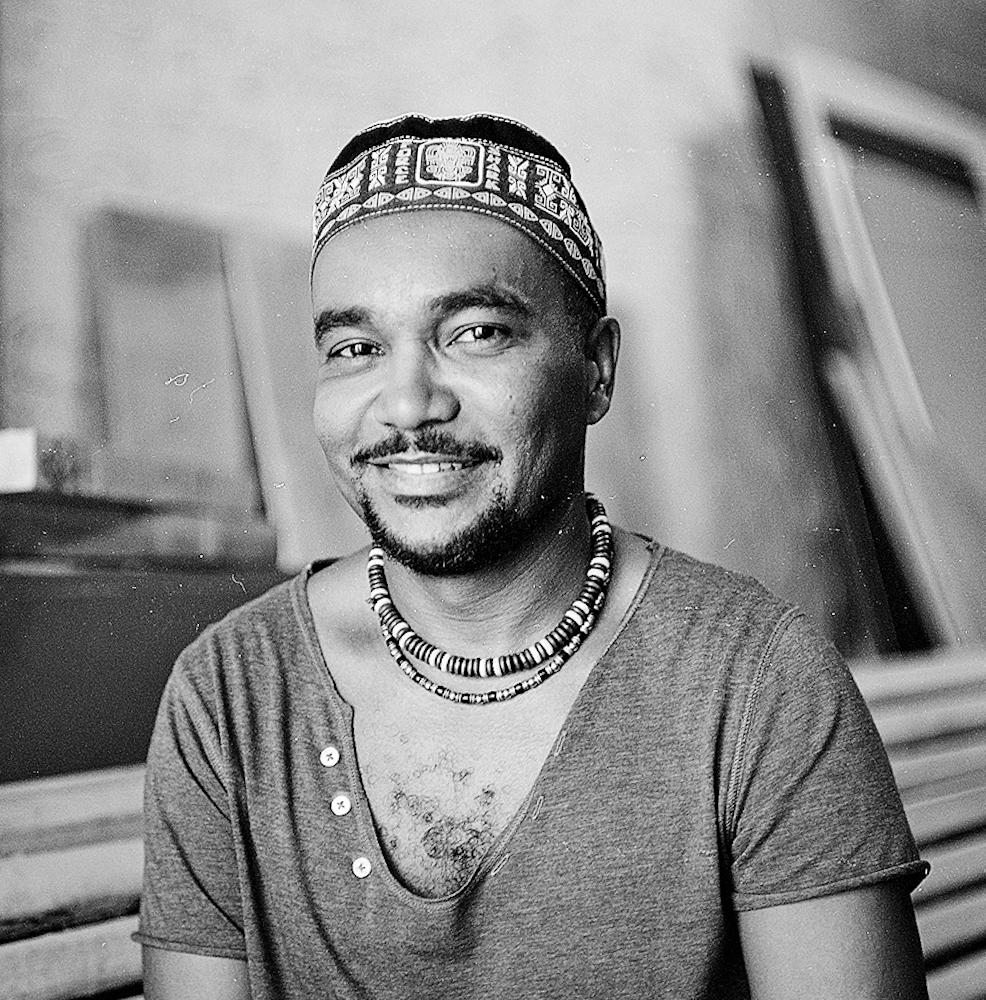
- Born: Grigory Davidovich Siyatvinda; 26 April 1970 (age 56); Tyumen, RSFSR, USSR
- Citizenship: Russian
- Occupation: Actor
- Years active: 1994–present
- Spouse: Alexandra Siyatvinda

Grigory Davidovich Siyatvinda (Russian: Григорий Дэвидович Сиятвинда; born 26 April 1970) is a Russian actor. He has been awarded the Merited Artist of the Russian Federation in 2006 and the State Prize of the Russian Federation laureate in 2004.

== Biography ==
Siyatvinda was born into a mixed-race family in Tyumen, Russian SFSR, Soviet Union (modern-day Tyumen Oblast of Russia). His mother was a native of Tyumen and his father, David Siatwinda, was a medical student from Zambia. Due to a mistake in his birth certificate, Grigory's surname transformed into Siyatvinda. After two and a half years, the family moved to Zambia. When Siyatvinda turned five, his parents divorced. Siyatvinda and his mother returned to Tyumen where he was raised by his stepfather, a well-known Tyumen artist Anatoly Kvasnevsky. Siyatvinda identifies as a Russian. When he was twelve, he began attending drama school.

After secondary school, he studied engineering cybernetics at Tyumen State Oil and Gas University but dropped out within a year. He served in the Soviet Army armoured corps. Later, he took acting courses from Alla Kazanskaya in the Boris Shchukin Theatre Institute. As a student, he began performing at the Vakhtangov Theatre and, upon graduation in 1995, became an actor of the Satyricon theatre where he continues to act.

He performed in many classical plays such as The Threepenny Opera, Hamlet, Macbeth, A Profitable Position, and Masquerade. He also performed in some modern plays including the role of Toby in Martin McDonagh's A Behanding in Spokane. In 2004, he was awarded the State Prize of the Russian Federation for his distinguished stage performance. Noteworthy roles he played at the Moscow Pushkin Drama Theatre include Max in Tom Stoppard's The Real Thing and Glum the giant in Grigori Gorin's The House That Swift Built. At the Moscow Art Theatre, he notably performed in the rock play Rebels.

Siyatvinda's debuted in film in the tragicomedy Don't Play the Fool... in 1997. He rose in popularity in 2005 after his performance in Aleksei Balabanov's black comedy Dead Man's Bluff playing failed criminal, Eggplant, alongside Sergei Makovetsky and Anatoly Zhuravlyov. Afterwards, he acted in films and television series such as Deadly Force 6 and Paragraph 78. He also played Mikhail Jackovich in the sitcom Kitchen and its two spinoffs: Hotel Eleon and Grand. In 2003, Siyatvinda hosted Morning at NTV on the NTV TV channel. He appeared in the first season of ice show contest Ice Age. Siyatvinda is married to Russian dancer and choreographer Tatiana Siyatvinda.

== Selected filmography ==
- Don't Play the Fool... (1997) as Vasya
- Dead Man's Bluff (2005) as Eggplant
- Deadly Force 6 (2005) as Ngubiev
- Paragraph 78 (2007) as Festival
- All Inclusive (2011) as Karaduman
- Fairytale.Is (2011) as Sprehshtalmeyster
- Kitchen (2015–2016) as Mikhail Jackovich
- Hotel Eleon (2016–2017) as Mikhail Jackovich
- Forsaken (2018) as Grisha Star
- Grand (2018–present) as Mikhail Jackovich
- Desperate Shareholders (2022) as Leonid
