= Nonna Grishayeva =

Russian actress (born 1971)

- Нонна Гришаева
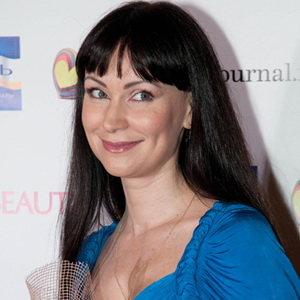
- Nonna Grishayeva in 2010
- Born: Nonna Valentinovna Grishayeva; July 21, 1971 (age 55); Odesa, Ukrainian SSR, Soviet Union
- Occupations: Actress, comedian, singer
- Years active: 1992–present
- Spouse(s): Anton Dyorov (m. 1994–2001; 1 child); Aleksander Nesterov (m. 2006–present; 1 child)
- Children: Anastasia Dyorova (born 1996); Ilya Nesterov (born 2006)
- Parent(s): Valentin Grishayev, Margarita Grishayeva
- Website: Official website

Nonna Valentinovna Grishayeva (Russian: Но́нна Валенти́новна Гриша́ева; born 21 July 1971) is a Soviet and Russian actress of theater, film and television, master parody, TV presenter and singer. She's Honored Artist of Russia (2006).

== Biography ==
She lives and works in Moscow.

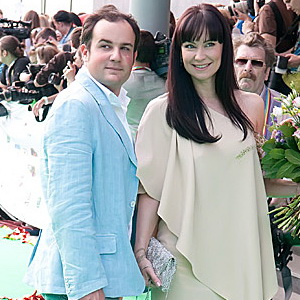
Nonna Grishaeva with spouse Alexander Nesterov at the award ceremony Muz-TV 2011.

== Filmography ==
Year	Title	Role	Notes
1992	Risk Without Contract	Lena	
1995	Moscow Holidays	technician, in love with Grisha	
1996	Police Story 4: First Strike	Natasha Rekshynskaya	
1998	The Countess de Monsoreau	Gertruda	TV series
2001	A Place on Earth		
2002	Line protection	Irina	TV series
2002	Secret Power	Nastya	
2004	Nadezhda spent the last	Tatiana	TV series
2005-2006	Luba, children and the plant ...	Anastasia Pryakhina	TV series
2006	Asiris Nuna		
2006	Money Day		
2007-2013	Daddy's Daughters	Lyudmila Sergeyevna Vasnetsova, mom	TV series
2007	Election Day	Nonna	
2008	Photographer	Alena, girlfriend Molchanovy	TV series
2008	Radio Day	Nonna	
2008	New Rate	flower-girl	
2009	All Inclusive	Evelina	
2010	What Men Talk About	Slava’s imaginary wife	
2010	Irony of Love	Psikhoanalitik	
2010	On the Edit	wife of deputy Solomatina	
2010	Troubadour		(Short)
2011	All inclusive, или Всё включено	Evelina	
2012	Cinderella	Feya / Agniya Barto	
2012	One more Karloson!	Yelena Aleksandrovna	
2012	A man with a guarantee	Irina Soboleva, the owner of shopping center	
2013	Planes	Tanya	Animated movie
2013	Return of Pinocchio	Malvina (voice)	Cartoon
2013	All inclusive 2	Evelina	
2013	How to catch a feather Firebird	The Fright (voice)	Cartoon
2014	Faster than rabbits	Sveta, wife Garik	
2014	Belka and Strelka: Lunar Adventures	Belka (voice)	Cartoon
2014	Trumpeter	Svetlana	
2015	Nepridumannoe life	Volgina	TV series
2015	Urgent marry	Alisa	
2015	Sofia		
2016	From bottom of vertices		
2016	Election Day 2		
2019	Fixies vs. Crabots	Erica (voice)	3D Cartoon
