= Life Ahead =

2017 Russian comedy film

- Directed by: Karen Oganesyan
- Produced by: Karen Oganesyan
- Starring: Egor Koreshkov; Olga Medynich; Pavel Priluchny; Denis Shvedov; Artur Smolyaninov; Yulia Alexandrova; Valeria Kozhevnikova; Maksim Vitorgan; Aleksandr Pal; Svetlana Khodchenkova
- Cinematography: Vasily Grigolyunas
- Production companies: Glavkino; KARGO; NTV
- Release date: 2017
- Running time: 86 minutes
- Country: Russia
- Box office: $1,890,639

Life Ahead (Russian: «Жизнь впереди») is a 2017 Russian comedy film directed by Karen Oganesyan. The story follows a group of former classmates of 11 “B” who reunite 15 years after graduation at the funeral of one of their peers. The film stars Egor Koreshkov, Olga Medynich, Pavel Priluchny, Denis Shvedov, Artur Smolyaninov, Yulia Alexandrova, Valeria Kozhevnikova, Maksim Vitorgan, Aleksandr Pal and Svetlana Khodchenkova.

The film premiered in Russia on 5 October 2017.

== Plot ==
Class 11 “B” reunites in Yaroslavl for the first time in 15 years at the funeral of their former classmate. For them, the gathering becomes a chance to briefly return to the past.

During the memorial, secrets about the classmates’ lives are revealed. Lyudmila, who moved to Europe, turns out to be a stripper, while Galina, a once-promising student who moved to Moscow, is unhappy in her personal life and dreams of having a child. Her friend Alla, the mother of several children, offers Galina her own husband Vladimir as a sperm donor.

Mikhail, a wealthy "major", arrives with a Black prostitute and begins behaving erratically after getting drunk.

Grigory Kiselev and Igor become embroiled in a conflict over a sex worker on their way to the memorial. After later crashing their car en route to the restaurant, they eventually reconcile.

Gennady kidnaps Lyuda, ties her up, and takes her to the middle of a lake in a boat to confess his love, but he falls overboard and Lyuda rescues him.

== Cast ==
- Egor Koreshkov as Sergey Tyulenev, gynecologist
- Olga Medynich as Maria
- Pavel Priluchny as Mikhail
- Denis Shvedov as Igor, bandit
- Artur Smolyaninov as Grigory Kiselev, Igor’s best friend
- Valeria Kozhevnikova as Alla
- Yulia Alexandrova as Galina, Alla’s best friend
- Maksim Vitorgan as Vladimir, Alla’s husband
- Aleksandr Pal as Gennady
- Svetlana Khodchenkova as Lyudmila, a stripper
- Elizaveta Martinez Cardenas as Klara
- Sergey Burunov as Oleg Viktorovich, P.E. teacher
- Ilya Khvostikov as Sergey Trushanin
- Artyom Semakin as Andrei Osokin
- Vladimir Danai as Georgy
- Yulia Volkova as singer in a restaurant

== Production ==
The lake rescue scene featuring Aleksandr Pal and Svetlana Khodchenkova was filmed without stunt doubles, with both actors entering the cold water in October. Valeria Kozhevnikova participated in filming while eight months pregnant.

== Release ==
Life Ahead was released on 5 October 2017. In Russia and CIS countries, it was viewed by 453,520 people, earning 109,241,136 rubles (US$1,890,639).

== Reception ==
Critic Yevgeny Ukhov noted parallels between Oganesyan’s film and Kiss Them All! by Zhora Kryzhovnikov. He writes: “ The novellas (the film is clearly divided into four large segments) are connected unevenly and sloppily—suggesting either the writers’ haste or loss of interest in the characters… To the finale, it seems that short films were hastily inserted into the main script… To make films of this kind requires special skills, and few possess them.”
