= Nothing to Hide (2018 film) =

2018 film directed by Fred Cavayé

- Film poster
- French: Le Jeu
- Directed by: Fred Cavayé
- Written by: Fred Cavayé
- Based on: Perfetti Sconosciuti by Paolo Genovese
- Produced by: Pietro Valsecchi; Camilla Nesbitt; Stéphane Célérier; Valérie Garcia
- Starring: Bérénice Bejo; Suzanne Clément; Stéphane De Groodt
- Cinematography: Denis Rouden
- Edited by: Mickael Dumontier
- Music by: Christophe Julien
- Production companies: Medset Film; Mars Films; France 2 Cinéma; C8 Films
- Distributed by: Mars Distribution
- Release date: 17 October 2018
- Running time: 90 minutes
- Country: France
- Language: French
- Budget: $8.8 million
- Box office: $13.2 million

Nothing to Hide (French: Le Jeu, lit. 'The Game' French pronunciation: [lə ʒø]) is a 2018 French dramatic comedy film written and directed by Fred Cavayé, adapted from the 2016 Italian film Perfect Strangers by Paolo Genovese.

== Plot ==
A group of longtime friends and their respective wives meet up one evening for a dinner party hosted by Marie and Vincent. A rare lunar eclipse is also expected to occur on the same evening. At the dinner table, after hearing of Ben's questionably humorous story of a woman who found out about her husband's extramarital affairs only upon his death after looking through the messages on his unlocked mobile phone, the group starts discussing their phone lock settings and sharing information on their phones with their spouses. To spice up the dinner, Marie then suggests a game where everyone surrenders their phones to the centre of the table and any messages, emails, or calls received on anyone's phone would have to be shared with everyone else. As the game progresses, more secrets begin to unravel, casting doubts on their friendships and marriages.

== Cast ==
- Bérénice Bejo as Marie
- Suzanne Clément as Charlotte
- Stéphane De Groodt as Vincent, Marie's husband
- Vincent Elbaz as Thomas
- Grégory Gadebois as Ben
- Doria Tillier as Léa, Thomas' newly-wedded wife
- Roschdy Zem as Marco, Charlotte's husband
- Fleur Fitoussi as Margot, the daughter of Marie and Vincent

== See also ==
- Perfect Strangers (2017), Spanish remake of Perfect Strangers
- Intimate Strangers (2018), South Korean remake of Perfect Strangers
- Loud Connection (2019), Russian remake of Perfect Strangers
- 12th Man (2022), 1001 Nunakal (2022), Khel Khel Mein (2024) - Indian films loosely based on Perfect Strangers
