= Maksim Vitorgan =

Russian actor and director

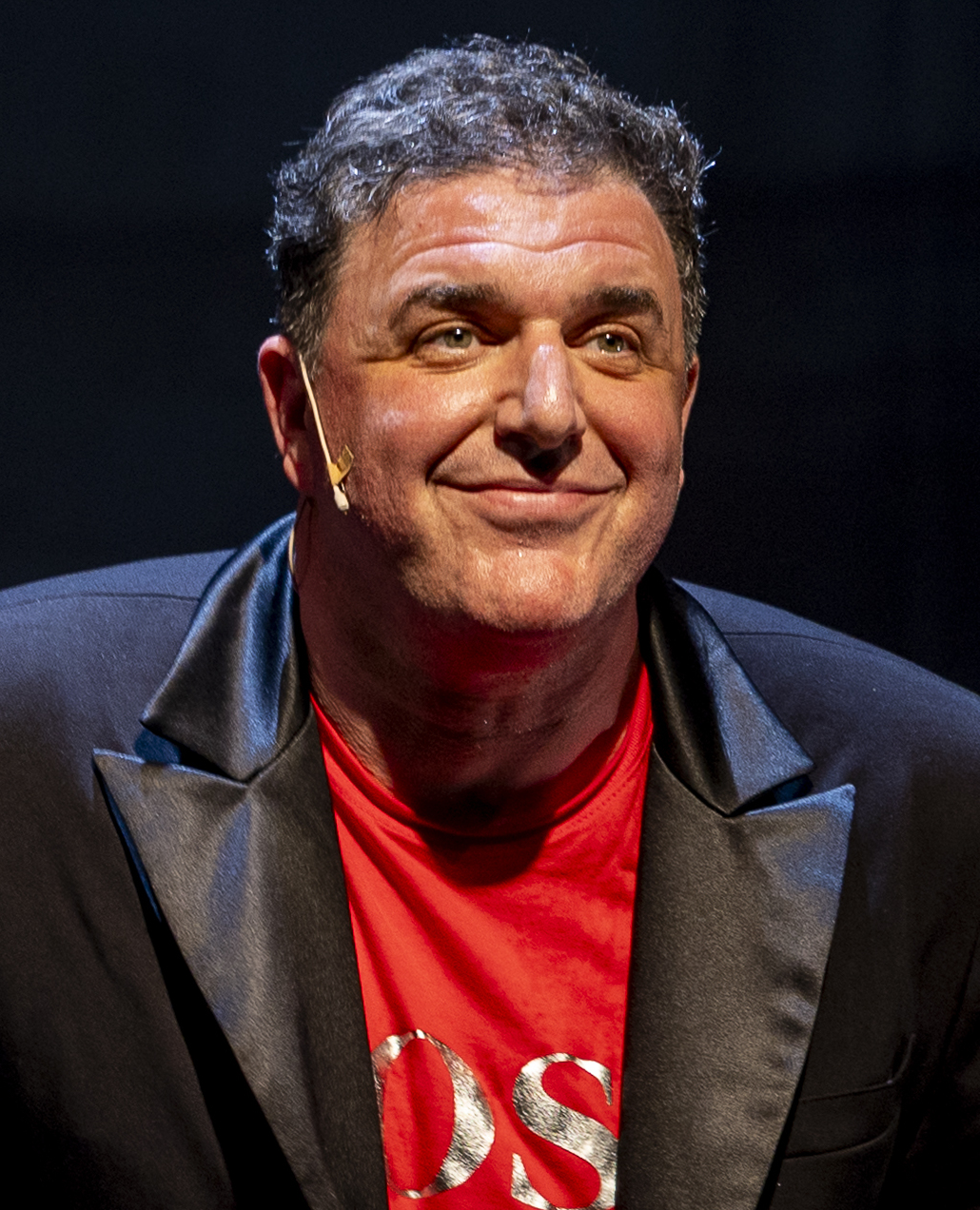
- Vitorgan in 2025
- Born: Maksim Emmanuilovich Vitorgan; September 10, 1972 (age 54); Moscow, Russian SFSR, Soviet Union
- Citizenship: Russia; Israel
- Occupations: Actor, theatre and television director, television and radio presenter
- Years active: 1994–present
- Parent(s): Emmanuil Vitorgan; Alla Balter

Voice of Maksim Vitorgan
Interview on Echo of Moscow, 26 February 2012

Maksim Emmanuilovich Vitorgan (Russian: Максим Эммануилович Виторган; born 10 September 1972) is a Russian actor of theatre, film, television, and voice acting, as well as a theatre and television director and a television and radio presenter.

== Early life and education ==
Vitorgan was born in Moscow into a family of actors, the son of Emmanuil Vitorgan and Alla Balter. He studied at Moscow School No. 20 with advanced English instruction and graduated from the Russian Institute of Theatre Arts (GITIS) in 1993, where he studied under Irina Sudakova.

== Career ==
After graduating, Vitorgan joined the Moscow Youth Theatre, appearing in classical productions such as The Storm and The Execution of the Decembrists. In 1999, he joined the Lenkom Theatre, and later became a member of the Moscow Art Theatre troupe, performing in productions including Antigone, Crime and Punishment, and Quantity.

He has appeared in films since 1994 and gained wide popularity for his role as DJ Max in the comedy films Election Day, Radio Day, and What Men Still Talk About.

Vitorgan has also worked extensively in television as a director and presenter. He directed entertainment programs such as Neboluboy Ogonyok and served as host of Through the Mouth of a Child on Disney Channel Russia (2013–2014). In 2018, he became the host of the detective show Sherlocks on TV-3.

In 2018, he appeared in the award-winning drama The Man Who Surprised Everyone. In 2020, he played one of the leading roles in the television series Besprincipnye.

== Public views and activism ==
Vitorgan took part in the 2011–2013 Russian protests against election fraud.

In 2013, he publicly opposed Russia's so-called “anti-gay propaganda” law, calling it an attempt to divide society.

He supported Alexei Navalny during the 2013 Moscow mayoral campaign and later spoke out after Navalny's poisoning and imprisonment.

In February 2022, Vitorgan condemned the Russian invasion of Ukraine, calling it a disgrace, and expressed support for cultural figures labeled as “foreign agents” by Russian authorities.

In 2023, he was reportedly removed from the second season of the TV series Contact and replaced with a deepfake, allegedly due to his anti-war stance.

== Personal life ==
Vitorgan has been married three times. His first marriage was to actress Victoria Verberg, with whom he has two children. His third marriage was to television presenter and journalist Ksenia Sobchak (2013–2019); they have a son, Platon (born 2016).

From 2019 to 2023, he was in a relationship with actress Nino Ninidze.

== Selected filmography ==
- Composition for Victory Day (1998)
- Election Day (2007) – DJ Max
- Radio Day (2008) – DJ Max
- What Men Talk About (2010) – Romeo
- What Men Still Talk About (2011) – DJ Max
- Möbius (2013)
- Love Does Not Love (2014)
- Londongrad (TV series, 2015)
- Life Ahead (2017) – Vladimir
- Yana+Yanko (2017) – Igor
- Maximum Impact (2017)
- Forsaken (2018) – Pyotr Novikov
- Jumpman (2018)
- The Man Who Surprised Everyone (2018) – Professor
- Besprincipnye (2020) – Konstantin
- Contact (2021) – Alexander Padin
- BOOMERang (2021) – Seryoga
- Normalny tolko ya (2021) – Roma
- O chyom govoryat muzhchiny. Prostye udovolstviya (2023)

== Theatre ==
- Election Day – Quartet I Theatre
- Radio Day – Quartet I Theatre
- Crime and Punishment – Moscow Art Theatre
- Antigone – Moscow Art Theatre
