= Loud Connection =

- Theatrical release poster
- Directed by: Aleksey Nuzhnyy
- Written by: Leonid Barats
- Based on: Perfect Strangers by Filippo Bologna, Paolo Costella, Paolo Genovese, Paola Mammini and Rolando Ravello
- Produced by: Leonid Barats; Larisa Blazhko; Ruben Dishdishyan; Rostislav Khait
- Starring: Kamil Larin; Maria Mironova; Rostislav Khait; Irina Gorbacheva; Leonid Barats
- Cinematography: Mikhail Milashin
- Edited by: Avet Hovhannisyan
- Music by: Dmitry Emelyanov; Dmitry Lanskoy; Yuri Abbakumov
- Production companies: Mars Media Entertainment; Strela Film Studio; Columbia Pictures
- Distributed by: Walt Disney Studios Sony Pictures Releasing
- Release date: 14 February 2019
- Running time: 96 min.
- Country: Russia
- Language: Russian

Loud Connection (Russian: Громкая связь, romanized: Gromkaya svyaz) is a 2019 Russian comedy film directed by Aleksey Nuzhnyy. It is a remake of the 2016 Italian film Perfect Strangers (2016).

== Plot ==
Seven friends, gathered in a country house, jokingly begin the game-the participants must read aloud all the messages coming to them, and answer calls only on the speakerphone. They can not imagine what amazing revelations they have to make about each other.

== Cast ==
- Kamil Larin as Lev
- Maria Mironova as Eva, Lev's wife
- Rostislav Khait as Boris
- Irina Gorbacheva as Alina, Boris's wife
- Leonid Barats as Vadim
- Anastasia Ukolova as Yekaterina, Vadim's wife
- Aleksandr Demidov as Dmitry

== See also ==
- Perfect Strangers
- Perfect Strangers (2017), Spanish remake of Perfect Strangers
- Nothing to Hide (2018), French remake of Perfect Strangers
- Intimate Strangers (2018), South Korean remake of Perfect Strangers
