= Don't Heal Me =

- Russian theatrical release poster
- Directed by: Mikhail Marales
- Written by: Mikhail Marales; Mariya Mkrtychyova; Irina Udyakova; Elena Vakhrushevskaya
- Produced by: Elena Sever; Tatiana Statsman
- Starring: Ivan Yankovsky; Lukerya Ilyashenko; Aleksandr Demidov; Dmitry Nagiyev; Elena Sever; Pyotr Fyodorov; Daniil Vakhrushev; Natalya Tetenova
- Cinematography: Dmitriy Karnachik
- Music by: Aleksey Aygi
- Production companies: Russky Sever; Columbia Pictures
- Distributed by: Sony Pictures Releasing CIS
- Release date: January 14, 2021
- Running time: 88 minutes
- Country: Russia
- Language: Russian

Don't Heal Me (Russian: Не лечи меня, romanized: Ne lechi menya) is a 2021 Russian satirical film directed by Mikhail Marales. It was theatrically released in Russia on January 14, 2021.

== Plot ==
The film is about a trauma surgeon who constantly gets into trouble as a result of his kindness, but at the same time he maintains a positive outlook on life in spite of all enemies and circumstances.

== Cast ==
- Ivan Yankovsky as Ilya Tretyakov
- Lukerya Ilyashenko as Vera
- Aleksandr Demidov as Stepan Olegovich Kalugin
- Dmitry Nagiyev as Viktor Sergeyevich Popov
- Elena Sever as Oksana Valeryevna Sherman
- Pyotr Fyodorov as Vadim
- Daniil Vakhrushev as Maks Popov
- Natalya Tetenova as Tonya
- Yelena Panova as nurse
- Aleksandr Bashirov as a patient

== Awards ==
The film received three awards at the Solaris 2021 Film Festival - Best Comedy Film, Best Actor (Yankovsky) and Best Supporting Actor (Nagiyev).
