= Aziz Beishenaliev =

Kyrgyz actor from Kyrgyzstan

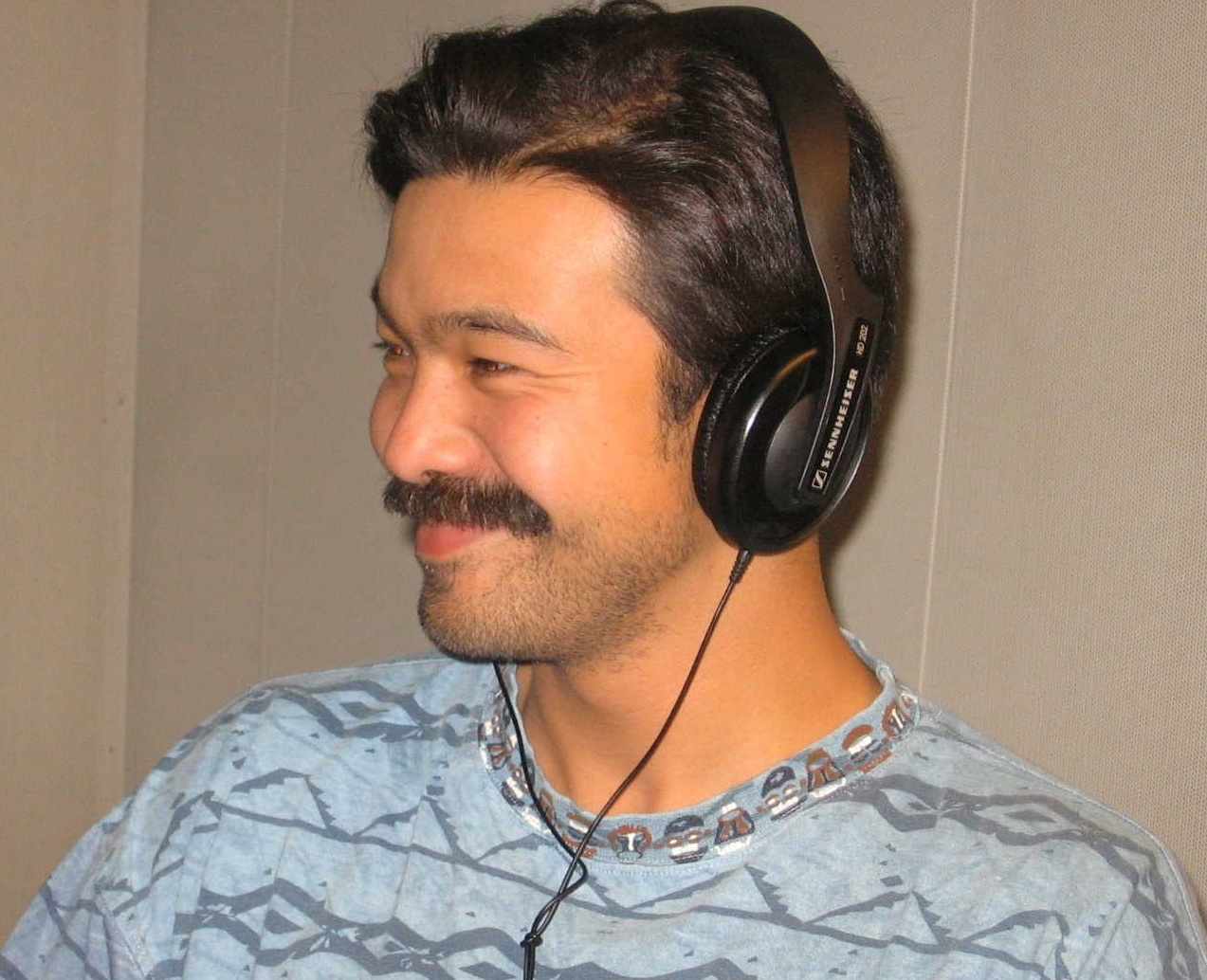
Aziz Beishenaliev 14.8.2006 Praga

Aziz Bolotovich Beishenaliev (Russian: Бейшеналиев Азиз Болотович) is a Kyrgyz actor from Kyrgyzstan. He was born on March 15, 1971. His father, Bolot Beishenaliev, is regarded as a prominent Kyrgyz film actor born in Kyrgyzstan.

From 1990 until 1992, he studied at Tashkent State University of Oriental Studies (Vostochka), Tashkent, Uzbekistan.

== Filmography ==
- Great Emir Temur (Буюк Амир Темур), Director: Isamat Ergashev, Bako Sadykov, Uzbekistan,1996
- Drongo (Дронго) TV series, Director: Zinovii Roizman, Russia, 2002
- Trio (Трио), Director: Aleksandr Proshkin, Russia, 2003
- The Jackpot for Cinderella (Джек-пот для Золушки), Director: Nikolai Stambula, Kazakhstan, 2004
- Wealth (Богатство), TV series, Director: Eldor Magomatovich Urazbayev, Russia, 2004
- The Great Dynasties (Великие династии), Director: Anna Melikian, Russia, 2005
- Mahambet's Match - The Red Woodworm (Меч Махамбета - Красная полынь), Director: Slambek Tauekel Kazakhstan, 2006
- Nomad: The Warrior (Көшпенділер, Köşpendiler), Director: Sergei Bodrov, Ivan Passer, Russia, Kazakhstan, 2006
- Birds of Paradise (Зымак кыстары Райские птицы), Director: Talgat Asyrankulov, Gaziz Nasyrov, Kyrgyzstan, Kazakhstan 2006
- Paragraph 78 (Параграф 78) Director: Mikhael Khleborodov, Russia, 2007
- Paragraph 78: Second movie (Параграф 78 - филм второй), Director: Mikhael Khleborodov, Russia, 2007
- Mustafa Shokai (Мустафа Чокай - Мустафа Шокай) Director: Satybaldy Narymbetor, Kazakhstan, 2008
- Fields, clowns, apples... (Поле, клоуны, яблоко ... ), Director: Șota Gomisoniia Russia 2008
- Semin (Семин), TV series, Director: Gennadi Baisak, Aleksandr Franskevich, Russia 2009
- The House near the Lake, (Дом на Озерной), Director Serik Aprymov, Russia, 2009
- Jumping Delfin Bottlenose, (Прыжок Афалины), Director: Eldor Magomatovich Urazbayev Russia, Kazakhstan, 2009
- The story of the pilot (История летчика), Director Yelena Nikolayeva, Arkadi Kaplun, Kazakhstan 2009
- The Liquidator (Лектор), Director: Vadim Shmelev Kazakhstan, 2010
- Special Doctor (Особенный доктор), Director: Sofia Vitver Kazakhstan, 2025
