= Radio Day (film) =

- Directed by: Dmitriy Dyachenko
- Written by: Leonid Barats; Sergei Petreikov; Rostislav Khait
- Produced by: Leonid Barats; Sergei Petreikov; Rostislav Khait
- Starring: Leonid Barats; Mikhail Kozyrev; Dmitry Maryanov; Kamil Larin; Nonna Grishayeva
- Cinematography: Maxim Trapo
- Music by: Aleksey Kortnev
- Production company: Central Partnership
- Release date: 20 March 2008
- Running time: 98 min
- Country: Russia
- Language: Russian

Radio Day (Russian: День радио, romanized: Den radio) is a 2008 Russian comedy film directed by Dmitriy Dyachenko.

== Plot ==
The film tells two intertwined stories: one about a small circus ship stranded without fuel in the Sea of Japan, and another involving an urgent crisis at the fictional radio station "Kak By Radio." As the station’s team scrambles to prepare for an imminent broadcast marathon, they discover their planned topic has been stolen by a competitor. In a burst of improvisation, they escalate the circus ship situation, claiming it holds a hundred rare animal species at risk, thus turning the incident into a supposed international crisis. A detailed list of endangered animals is hastily fabricated on the spot.

Radio hosts Nonna and Dima, along with technician Kamil (posing as an expert on rare animals), discuss the plight of the animals live on air, eventually getting tipsy as Kamil's participation hinges on the promise of a bottle. Throughout, the program director Misha and his team deal with various hiccups, including a fabricated interview with Brigitte Bardot, pieced together from a French audio course, and live performances from musicians supporting the "endangered" animals. As complications mount, Misha receives a call supposedly from the station owner informing him that an emergency rescue ship has been dispatched. Panic ensues as the team realizes that rescuers will only find a small circus troupe, not an endangered animal zoo. Fortunately, Misha’s connections resolve the misunderstanding. In the end, the marathon concludes successfully with the announcement of the animals' “rescue,” while the circus ship solves its own predicament independently.

== Cast ==
- Leonid Barats as Aleksei
- Mikhail Kozyrev as Mikhail Natanovich
- Dmitry Maryanov as DJ Dim
- Kamil Larin as Kamil
- Nonna Grishayeva as Nonna
- Aleksandr Demidov as Aleksandr
- Rostislav Khait as Slava
- Maksim Vitorgan as DJ Max
- Fyodor Dobronravov as captain
- Georgy Martirosyan as uncle Lyosha
- Klara Novikova as Mikhail's mother
- Sergey Mazayev as cameo
