= Maria Mironova =

Soviet and Russian actress

- Мария Миронова
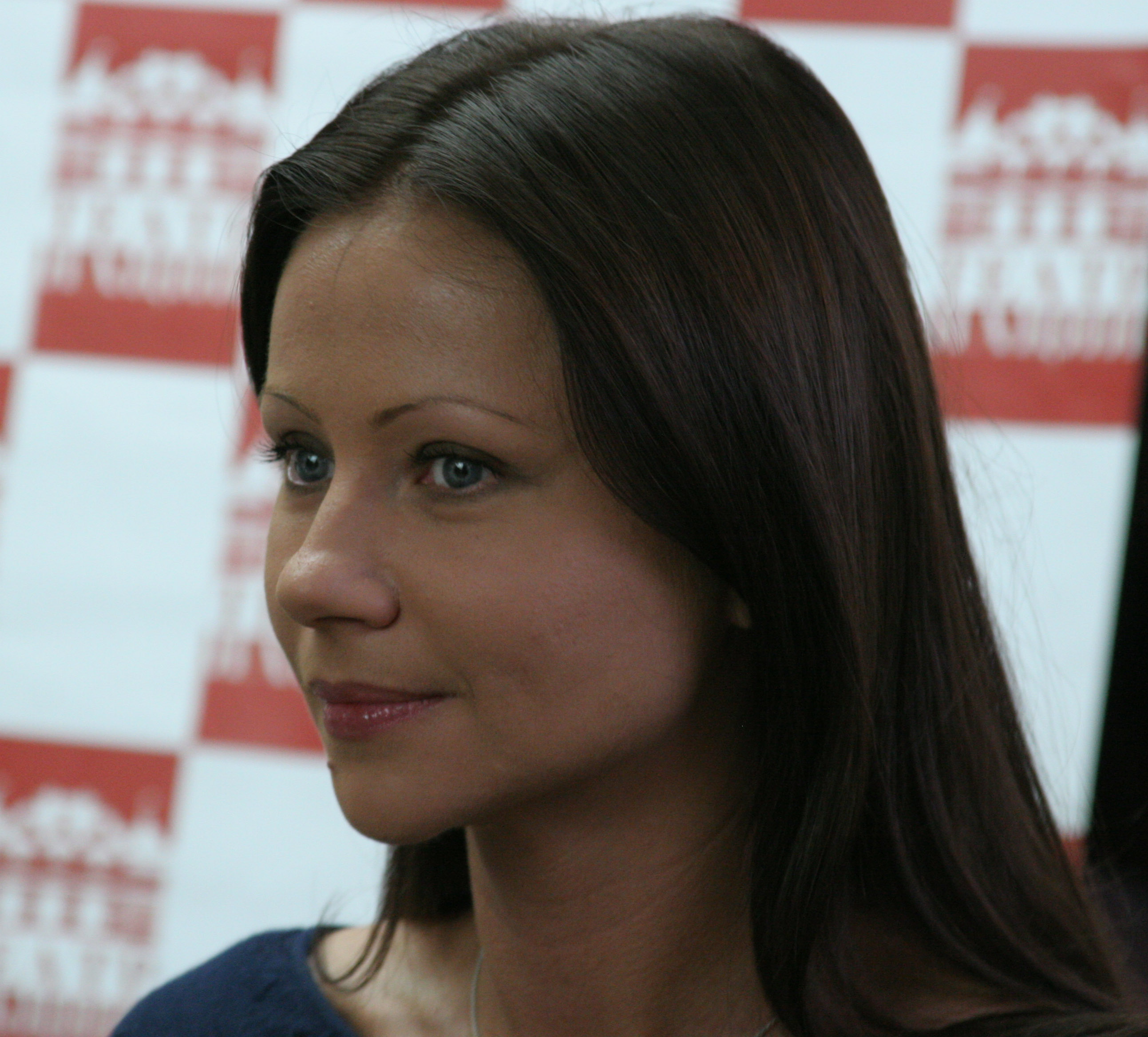
- Mironova in 2012
- Born: Maria Andreyevna Mironova; May 28, 1973 (age 53); Moscow, RSFSR, USSR
- Occupation: Actress
- Years active: 1981–present
- Title: Merited Artist of the Russian Federation (2006); People's Artist of the Russian Federation (2020)
- Children: 1
- Parent(s): Andrei Mironov; Yekaterina Gradova

Maria Andreyevna Mironova (Russian: Мари́я Андре́евна Миро́нова; born 28 May 1973) is a Soviet and Russian actress. She was named People's Artist of Russia in 2020.

== Biography ==
Maria was born on 28 May 1973 in Moscow, to actors Andrei Mironov and Ekaterina Gradova. After graduating from school, she entered The Vakhtangov Theatre Academy. In 1992, she gave birth to a son, Andrei. In 1993, she turned to Gerasimov Institute of Cinematography. Since 1997, she has been working at the Lenkom Theatre. Divorced since 2003.

== Public activity ==
Since 2008, co-founder and president of the Artist Foundation for the Support of Arts Professionals. Since 2008, a member of the art directorate of the Territory Festival.

Member of the Moscow Civic Chamber (2013). In the 2013 and 2018 Moscow mayoral elections, a campaign representative of candidate Sergei Sobyanin.

== Inclusion on list of persons who pose a threat to the national security of Ukraine ==
Mironova participated in the film "Sky", described as provocative and filmed on the territory of Occupied Crimea, which led to her inclusion on the list of individuals banned from entering Ukraine.

== Honours ==
She received the title of Meritorious Artist of the Russian Federation in April 2007. In April 2007 she also received the national Golden Mask theatre award in the Best Actress category for her performance as Phaedra in the play Phaedra: Golden Braid.

== Selected filmography ==
- The Wedding (2000)
- Tycoon (2002)
- Night Watch (2004)
- The State Counsellor (2005)
- The Fall of the Empire (2005)
- Space Race (TV series) (2005)
- Day Watch (2006)
- Earthquake (2016)
- Salyut 7 (2017)
- Loud Connection (2019)
- Robo (2019)
- Serf (2019)
- The Courier (2020)
- Sky (2021)
- The Doll Master (2022)
- Monastery (2022)
- Rodnina (2025)
