= What Men Still Talk About =

- Film poster
- Russian: О чём ещё говорят мужчины
- Directed by: Dmitriy Dyachenko
- Written by: Leonid Barats; Aleksandr Demidov; Rostislav Khait; Sergey Petreykov
- Produced by: Leonid Barats; Rostislav Khait
- Starring: Elena Babenko; Leonid Barats; Anatoliy Beliy; Sergey Burunov; Konstantin Chepurin
- Music by: Aleksey Kortnev
- Release date: December 30, 2011
- Country: Russia
- Language: Russian

What Men Still Talk About (Russian: О чём ещё говорят мужчины, romanized: O chyom eshchyo govoryat muzhchiny) is a 2011 Russian comedy film directed by Dmitriy Dyachenko.

== Plot ==
The characters spend almost the whole New Year's Day talking about women, about how difficult it is to communicate with those who are 20 years younger than you, how to quit your mistress correctly and how to prevent typical grammatical mistakes.

== Cast ==
- Elena Babenko
- Leonid Barats
- Anatoliy Beliy
- Sergey Burunov
- Konstantin Chepurin
- Rostislav Khait
- Kamil Larin
- Maksim Vitorgan
- Aleksey Makarov
- Vladimir Menshov
- Elena Podkaminskaya
- Denis Shvedov
