= Aleksandr Demidov =

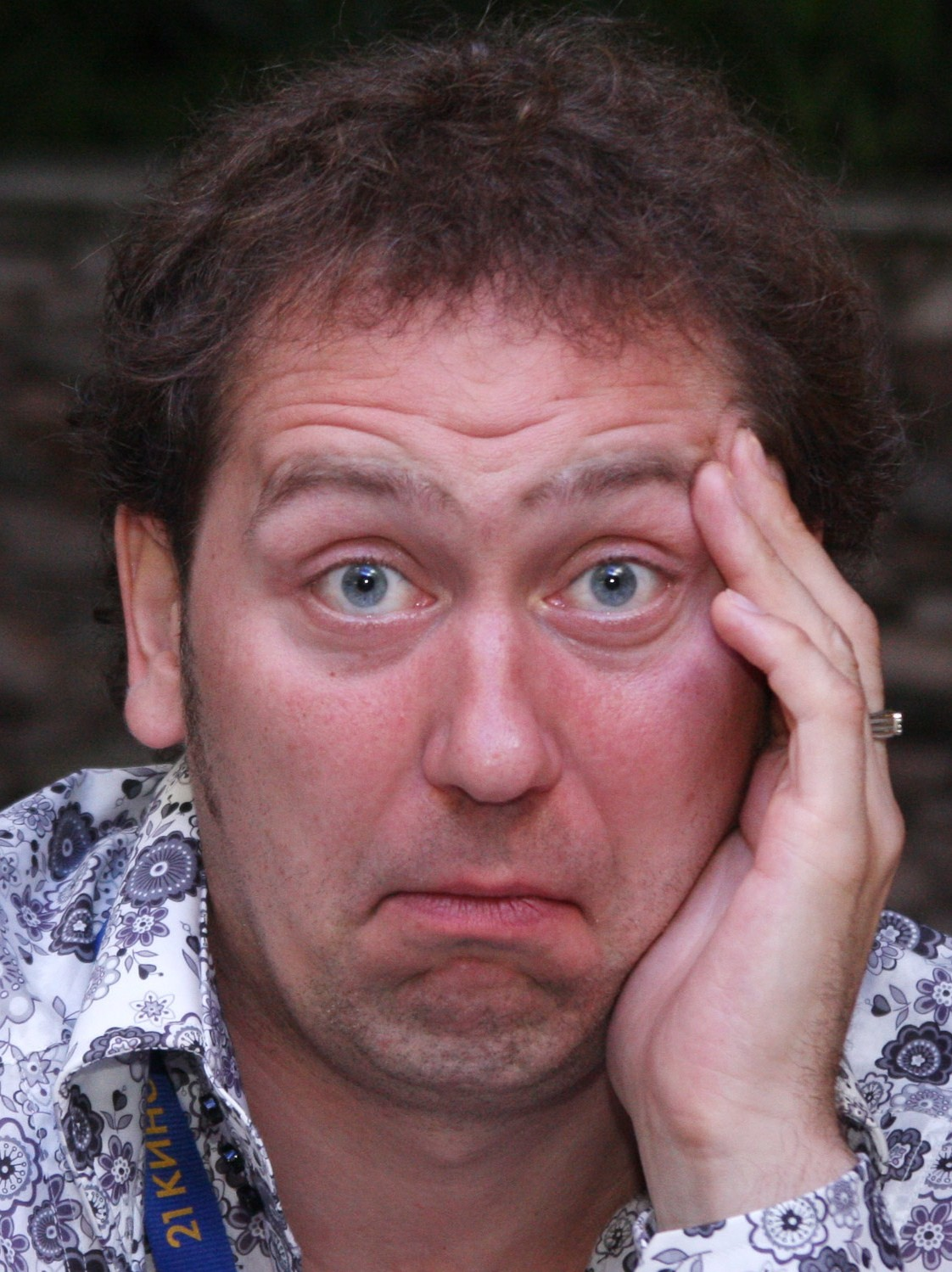
- Born: Aleksandr Demidov; 22 October 1970 (age 54); Yekaterinburg
- Occupation(s): Actor, screenwriter, camera operator, film producer

Aleksandr Demidov (Russian: Алекса́ндр Серге́евич Деми́дов) is a Russian actor, screenwriter, camera operator and film producer. Merited Artist of the Russian Federation.

== Selected filmography ==
Year	Title	Role	Notes
2007	Election Day	Sasha	
2008	Radio Day	Sasha	
2010	What Men Talk About	Sasha	
2019	Speakerphone	Dima	
2020	Feedback	Dima	
2021	Don't Heal Me	Stepan Olegovich Kalugin	
2023	What Men Talk About. Simple Pleasures		
