= Kamil Larin =

Russian actor

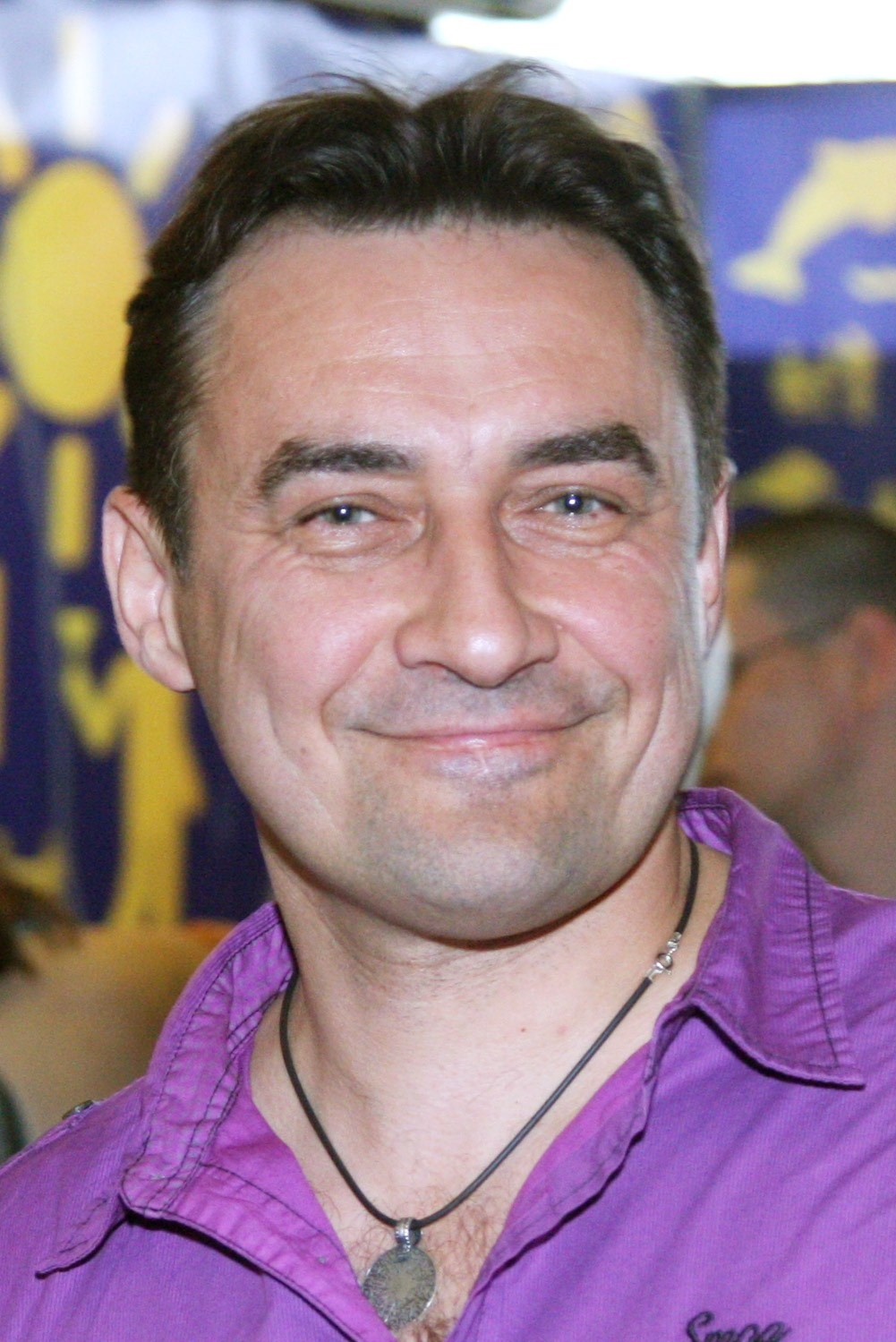
Kamil Larin

Kamil Shamil'yevich Larin (Russian: Камиль Шамильевич Ларин, Tatar: Камил Шамил улы Ларин; born 10 November 1966) is a Russian actor and one of the founders of comic theater Kvartet I. He became famous after the roles of electrician Kamil, named like him, in the performances of "Radio Day" and "Election Day" and in movies with the same names. He is an ethnic Tatar.

== Biography ==
Kamil Larin was born on 10 November 1966 in Volgograd, USSR, RSFSR. He graduated from an institute for energy in Volgograd.

In 1993 he graduated from the Russian Academy of Theatre Arts. There he met Alexandr Demidov, Leonid Baratz, Rostislav Khait, Sergey Petreykov. Together they founded the theater Quartet I.

Kamil is married to Galina Larina, and they have a son Yan Larin (born 25 February 1993).
