= Dunya Smirnova =

Russian screenwriter (born 1969)

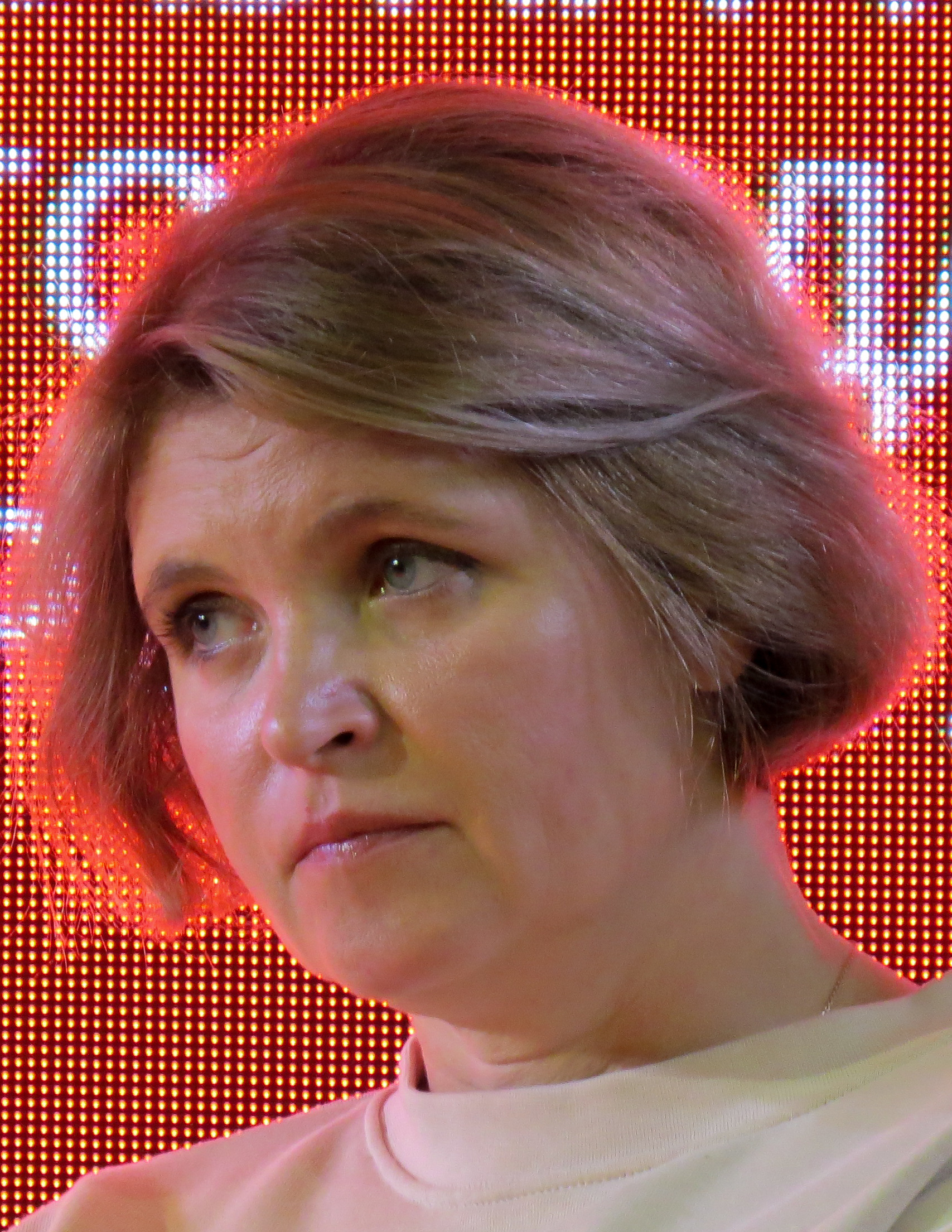
- Smirnova in 2018
- Born: Avdotya Andreevna Smirnova; 29 June 1969 (age 57); Moscow, Soviet Union
- Occupations: screenwriter, film director, TV presenter
- Years active: 1992–present

Avdotya (Dunya) Smirnova (Russian: Авдотья (Дуня) Смирнова; born 29 June 1969) is a Russian screenwriter, film director, producer, TV host and literary critic, winner of numerous awards and accolades, founder of the charity foundation Vikhod.

== Biography ==
=== Early years and family ===
Avdotya Smirnova was born to actors Natalya Rudnaya and Andrei Smirnov. Her grandfather Sergey Smirnov was a Soviet writer and historian.

Smirnova has been interested in cinema since childhood. When her father forbade her to enter Gerasimov Institute of Cinematography, she went to MSU Philology Department. After three years she transferred to GITIS, but didn’t finish her studies.

In 1987 and 1988, Smirnova worked at Mosfilm with Sergei Solovyov, in the meantime performing in punk-rock band Tupie and contributing to Urlait samizdat magazine. At age 20, Smirnova married Arkady Ippolitov and moved to Leningrad with him. In 1995, she was invited to Kommersant and emerged as a journalist, she contributed to Afisha, Vogue, Seans, and other magazines. For some time in the early 2000s she worked as a speechwriter for Union of Right Forces and Anatoly Chubais.

=== TV career ===
In 2002 to 2014, Smirnova co-hosted The School for Scandal with her long-time friend, Russian writer Tatyana Tolstaya. The program received TEFI award in 2003 in Best Talk Show nomination.

=== Screenwriter ===
Smirnova wrote her first screenplay in 1992. Together with Alexei Uchitel she created The Last Hero (Russian movie) about Kino leader Viktor Tsoi. In 1993, she wrote the Butterfly documentary, also in collaboration with Uchitel. In 1995, Gisele's Mania based on Smirnova’s screenplay was released. In 2000, Alexey Uchitel released His Wife's Diary based on Smirnova's screenplay. Smirnova was awarded at The Hartley-Merrill International Screening Competition.

Other movies written by Smirnova are The Stroll (2003), The Connection (2006), Gloss (2007), Fathers and Sons (2008), 9th of May: Personal Perspective. All films met mostly positive responses both by critics and the public.

=== Director ===
The Connection, released in 2006, became Smirnova's first experience as a director. Her comedy drama Two Days (2011) collected many awards but was much criticized for romanticizing the state officials as one of the protagonists and main hero in the movie was running for governor's post. In parallel with Smirnova's real life marriage to a top-ranking state official, critics perceived the film as an attempt to whitewash the image of the government employees.

In 2012, she released Kokoko, a movie co-written with Anna Parmas and directed by Smirnova. The tragicomedy about a Russian museum worker brought its main actress Anna Mikhalkova the Best Prize for acting at Kinotavr 2012 and numerous accolades for Smirnova.

In 2016, Smirnova became one of the directors of the Peterburg: only by love cinema almanac, a so-called love letter in a movie form to the cultural capital of Russia.

In 2018, Smirnova released The Story of a Single Purpose. The script is based on a true story that happened to 38-years old Leo Tolstoy.

In 2021, Smirnova released Vertinsky—an 8-series film about prominent Russian chansonnier Alexander Vertinsky.

In May 2025, Smirnova staged the play Beyond the Light at the Gesher Theatre in Tel Aviv. The production is based on a play written by Smirnova together with Marina Stepnova and stars Kseniya Rappoport in the lead role. The premiere was a great success, after which the play toured several cities across Israel. Currently, tours in Europe and the United States are being prepared.

=== Personal life ===
In 1990, Smirnova gave a birth to a son Danila Ippolitov with her then-husband Arkady Ippolitov. Danila had a career in beach soccer that ended in 2015. He graduated from Sergey Selyanov's course at the Saint Petersburg State Institute of Film and Television and currently works as a producer.

In 2012, Smirnova launched Vikhod charity foundation in St Petersburg. The foundation helps people with ASD in many aspects of their lives, it conducts educational, therapy, art and employment programmes. Since 2012, the foundation grew into a community with its own art studio, orchestra, training apartment of assisted living, etc. In the same year, she was awarded Woman of Year prize by GQ.

In 2012, Smirnova married Russian politician Anatoly Chubais.

In 2014, Smirnova signed an open letter of KinoSouz in support of Ukraine during the annexation of Crimea. In 2022, Smirnova signed an open letter to Vladimir Putin demanding to stop the 2022 Russian Invasion of Ukraine. In March 2022, she left Russia together with her husband Chubais, who resigned from the post of Special Presidential Envoy.
