= List of Russian films of 1996 =

A list of films produced in Russia in 1996 (see 1996 in film).

== 1996 ==
Title	Russian title	Director	Cast	Genre	Notes
Gisele's Mania	Мания Жизели	Aleksey Uchitel	Galina Tyunina	Drama	
Hello, Fools!	Привет, дуралеи!	Eldar Ryazanov	Tatyana Drubich	Comedy	
Inspector	Ревизор	Sergey Gazarov	Nikita Mikhalkov	Comedy	
Prisoner of the Mountains	Кавказский пленник	Sergei Bodrov	Oleg Menshikov	Drama	
The Little Cat	Котёнок	Ivan Popov	Andrei Kuznetsov	Adventure	
The Return of the Battleship	Возвращение «Броненосца»	Gennadi Poloka	Mikhail Urzhumtsev	Comedy	
Whoever Softer	Тот, кто нежнее	Abay Karpykov	Bopesh Jandaev	Drama	

== See also ==
- 1996 in Russia
