= Andrei Smirnov (actor) =

Russian actor and filmmaker

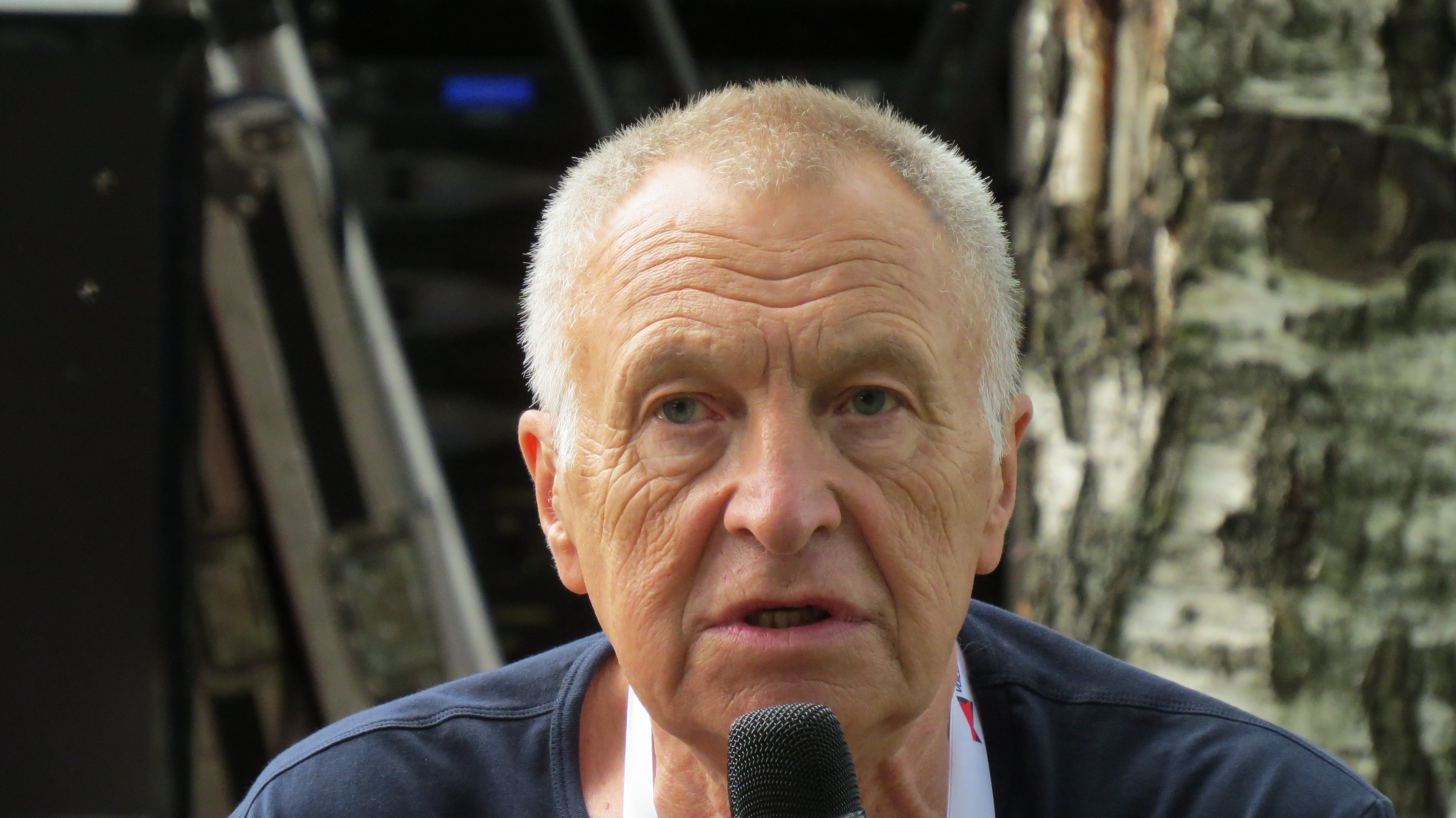
- Born: Andrei Sergeyevich Smirnov; 12 March 1941 (age 85); Moscow, Russian SFSR, Soviet Union
- Occupations: Actor; film director; screenwriter
- Years active: 1962–present

Andrei Sergeyevich Smirnov (Russian: Андpeй Сepгeeвич Смирнов; born 12 March 1941) is a Soviet and Russian actor and filmmaker who is known for directing the films Belorussian Station (1971), Autumn (1974) and A Frenchman (2019). He was a member of the jury at the 38th Berlin International Film Festival in 1988.

In 2003 he was awarded the title of People's Artist of Russia.

== Early life and education ==
Andrei Smirnov was born in Moscow to the family of writer Sergey Smirnov, author of books about the defenders of the Brest Fortress. When he was in seventh grade, the family moved to Maryina Roshcha District, where Andrei continued his studies in a special French school.

After finishing school, he was accepted into the directing department of VGIK in Moscow, Mikhail Romm's workshop. He graduated in 1962.

== Career ==
As a director, he made his debut with the war film The Land of the Earth (1964, together with Boris Yashin) based on the story of the same name by Grigory Baklanov.

Andrei Smirnov's first great success came when he directed the 1971 drama film Belorussian Station, which showed the psychological atmosphere of events closely intertwined with the memory of the Great Patriotic War.

In his next film, Autumn (1974), he turned to the theme of love, with an unusual for that time boldness about the relationship between the thirty-year-old man and woman.

After the film Faith and Truth (1979), devoted to different stages of the construction of Moscow, Smirnov decided to leave filmmaking. The reason was the criticism of various authorities and dissatisfaction with his own work.

Smirnov began to work mainly as a screenwriter and playwright. His play My Own in 1985 was staged by the Moscow Satire Theatre.

He wrote screenplays for the films Sentimental Journey to Potatoes (1986), I Did Everything I Could (1986), and also the episodes The Medicine of Fear in the second season of television series Beyond the Wolves (2004).

In the 1990s, Smirnov staged television performances, television concerts, and theater productions. Among them - Dinner in the Moscow Art Theatre - Theater-Studio O. Tabakov (1994), A Month in the Country in Comédie-Française (1997).

In 2011, he returned to filmmaking and made a national drama Once Upon a Time There Lived a Simple Woman, acting simultaneously as a screenwriter and producer. The film won the Nika Award for best film. It also received four more Nika Awards - for best script work, best female role, best supporting actor and best costume design.

His 2019 film A Frenchman won several awards, including Nika Awards for best film and best director.

== Acting roles ==
Smirnov has starred in a number of notable roles as an actor, including the main roles in the films Chernov (1990) by Sergei Yursky, His Wife's Diary (2000) by Alexei Uchitel, Fathers and Sons (2008) by Avdotya Smirnova and Elena (2011) by Andrey Zvyagintsev. Smirnov also starred in the series The Right to Defense (2002), The Idiot (2003), The Instructor (2003), Moscow Saga (2004), The First Circle (2006), The Apostle (2008) ), Heavy Sand (2008), Churchill (2009), The Thaw (2013), and Black Cats (2013).

== Other roles and activities ==
Smirnov was engaged in public activities. In 1988-1990, he was Acting First Secretary of the Union of Cinematographers of the USSR.

Between 1987-1995 he was the artistic director of the studio "Debut".

He taught at the High Courses for Scriptwriters and Film Directors.

== Personal life ==
Andrei Smirnov is married with a second marriage to Honored Artist of Russia Elena Prudnikova. His first wife was actress Natalia Rudnaya. Smirnov has two daughters from his first marriage — Avdotya and Alexandra, from the second — a daughter, Aglaya, and a son, Alexey. Dunya Smirnova is a well-known screenwriter and director, she co-hosted the television program "School of Scandal". Andrei acted in her films Gisele's Mania, His Wife's Diary, Fathers and Sons, Two Days.

He condemned the annexation of Crimea in 2014 and supported the 2020–2021 Belarusian protests.

== Selected filmography ==
=== Actor ===
- His Wife's Diary (2000)
- The Idiot (TV, 2003)
- Elena (2011)
- Two Days (2011)
- The Thaw (TV, 2013)
- Moscow Saga (TV, 2014)

=== Director ===
- Belorussian station (1970)
- Autumn (1974)
- Once Upon a Time There Lived a Simple Woman (2011)
- A Frenchman (2019)
- Here's to You and Us! (2023)

== Honours and awards ==
- Order "For Merit to the Fatherland", 4th class
- People's Artist of Russia
- Grand Prize at the I Festival of contemporary cinema in Karlovy Vary (1971) - for the film "Belorussian Station"
- For his performance as the writer Ivan Bunin in "His Wife's Diary", Smirnov won several awards:
  - Frieda B. Prize at the VI International Human Rights Film Festival "Stalker" (2000)
  - Best Actor prize - Minsk International Film Festival Listapad (2000)
  - Best Actor prize - National Prize of the Russian Academy of Cinema Arts (Nika Award) (2000)
  - Best Actor prize - 7th Gatchina Festival "Literature and Cinema" (2001)
- Prize of the President of the Festival, XIX Festival in Vyborg (August 2011) - for "Window to Europe"
- Grand Prize at the 22nd Open Russian Film Festival Kinotavr (June 2011)
- Nika Award (2011) - for the film "Once Upon a Time There Lived a Simple Woman" in the "Best Screenplay" and his film named "Best Feature Film"
