= Yevgeny Mironov (actor) =

Soviet & Russian actor (born 1966)

- Евгений Миронов
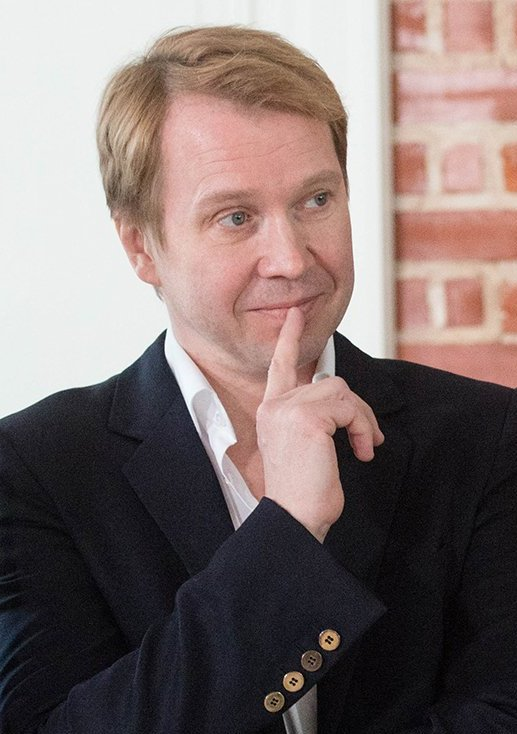
- Mironov in 2018
- Born: Yevgeny Vitalyevich Mironov; 29 November 1966 (age 59); Saratov, RSFSR, USSR
- Citizenship: Soviet Union (until 1991); Russia
- Education: Moscow Art Theatre
- Occupation: Actor
- Years active: 1987–present
- Awards: Nika Award (1995, 2006, 2011); Golden Eagle Award (2004, 2012, 2018); TEFI (2003); Kinotavr (1992); Golden Mask (2010, 2012)

Yevgeny Vitalyevich Mironov (Russian: Евге́ний Вита́льевич Миро́нов; born 29 November 1966) is a Soviet and Russian film and stage actor. Merited Artist of the Russian Federation (1996), People's Artist of Russia (2004), State Prize of the Russian Federation laureate – 1995, 2010. Yevgeny Mironov lives and works in Moscow, Russia.

As of 2021 Mironov is artistic director of the Theatre of Nations.

== Early life and education ==
Yevgeny Mironov was born in Saratov, Russian SFSR, Soviet Union (now Russia). The family lived in a military townlet then called Tatis. Yevgeny's father was a professional chauffeur, his mother changed jobs – from saleswoman to a Christmas ornaments manufacturer. The Mironovs, avid amateur performers, were artistic and creative people in their everyday life.

Mironov as a child took acting classes, joined an amateur dance group and graduated from music school as an accordion player. He and his younger sister Oksana put on puppet shows for which they made their own puppets, wrote scripts and then performed in front of relatives. In school, Yevgeny put on and acted in plays and musicals, often of his own creation. Oksana Mironova, now a ballet dancer, studied at the Saratov School of Choreography and later at the Vaganova Academy of Russian Ballet. After graduating, she was invited to join the State Academic Theater of Classical Ballet, where she danced for 10 years. At present, she is teaching in her own ballet studio associated with the Russian State Social University.

== Career ==
In 1982, Mironov left his school in Tatischevo-5 to enter the Saratov Slonov Theater School, one of the few such establishments that accepted 14-year-olds, which he graduated in 1986. He was offered a job with the Saratov Children's Theater, but he chose instead to continue to study acting at the prestigious Moscow Art Theatre under his famous Saratov compatriot, actor and director Oleg Tabakov.

In Moscow Mironov succeeded in getting an interview with Tabakov, but the acting class was already in its second year. Tabakov gave Mironov a probation period, after the successful completion of which he was accepted to the School-Studio as a sophomore. After graduating in 1990, he became, and remains, a resident actor at the Oleg Tabakov Theater. In that capacity he has played a variety of notable parts, including the title role in the hit "The Passions of Bumbarash" (directed by Vladimir Mashkov), which opened in 1993 and is still playing to full houses.

Mironov's film career began in 1988 with the Alexander Kaidanovsky film The Kerosene Salesman's Wife. After appearing in a few low-budget films, Mironov gained national recognition and critical acclaim for his lead performance in Valery Todorovsky's beloved coming-of-age drama, Love (1991), for which he received several national and international film awards and was voted Best Actor of 1992 by Russian film critics. His next success was in Pyotr Todorovsky's comedy-drama Encore Again!, which solidified Mironov's popularity. He went on to play leads in Denis Yevstigneyev's Limita and Mama, and to receive a Best Supporting Actor award at the 1995 Sozvezdie International Film Festival for a special appearance in Nikita Mikhalkov's Oscar-winning Burnt by the Sun. In 1994, he starred in Vladimir Khotinenko's controversial drama The Moslem. Also notable among his early film efforts is the character of Khlestakov in Sergei Gazarov's screen adaptation of Gogol's The Government Inspector.

Mironov's characters include sinister mama's boy in Nikolai Lebedev's Snake Spring, a lovelorn sponger in His Wife's Diary and a naive Soviet cook in Dreaming of Space (both directed by Alexei Uchitel), the deceptively simple intelligence officer in Mikhail Ptashuk's August of 44, the man-turned-bug in Valery Fokin's adaptation of Kafka's "The Metamorphosis", a war-deranged soldier in Andrei Konchalovsky's House of Fools, an arrogant surgeon in Yegor Konchalovsky's "Escape", a talented loser in Konstantin Khudyakov's "On Upper Maslovka", and a millionaire psycho killer in Andrei Kavun's The Hunt for Piranha. 2003 saw Mironov's portrayal of Prince Myshkin in Vladimir Bortko's historymaking TV adaptation of Dostoyevsky's The Idiot, followed by leads in two other acclaimed TV productions – as the young Aleksandr Solzhenitsyn in an adaptation of his autobiographical "In the First Circle" by Gleb Panfilov (2006), and as twin brothers in Yuri Moroz's action-adventure miniseries "The Apostle".

By the mid-1990s, Mironov also starred in international stage projects as German director Peter Stein's The Oresteia and Hamlet, Declan Donnellan's Boris Godunov, Valery Fokin's The Last Night of the Last Czar and The Karamazovs and Hell (for which he was awarded the State Prize of the Russian Federation). In 2003 he appeared as Lopakhin in Eimuntas Nekrošius' production of The Cherry Orchard. Mironov actively collaborates with the Moscow Art Theatre, where he has appeared as Treplev (The Seagull, 2001–2006), George Pigden (No. 13/Out of Order, 2001), and Porfiry Golovlyov (The Golovlyovs, 2005). In 2006 he founded the Mironov Theater Company and produced Figaro. The Events of One Day, directed by Kirill Serebrennikov with Mironov as the lead.

On 18 December 2006, Mironov became Artistic Director of Moscow's State Theatre of Nations, where he has : Shukshin's Stories by Alvis Hermanis, Figaro. The Events of One Day by Kirill Serebrennikov, Caligula by Eimuntas Nekrošius, Miss Jilie by Thomas Ostermeier and Hamlet | Collage by Robert Lepage.

As of 2021 Mironov remains in the role of artistic director.

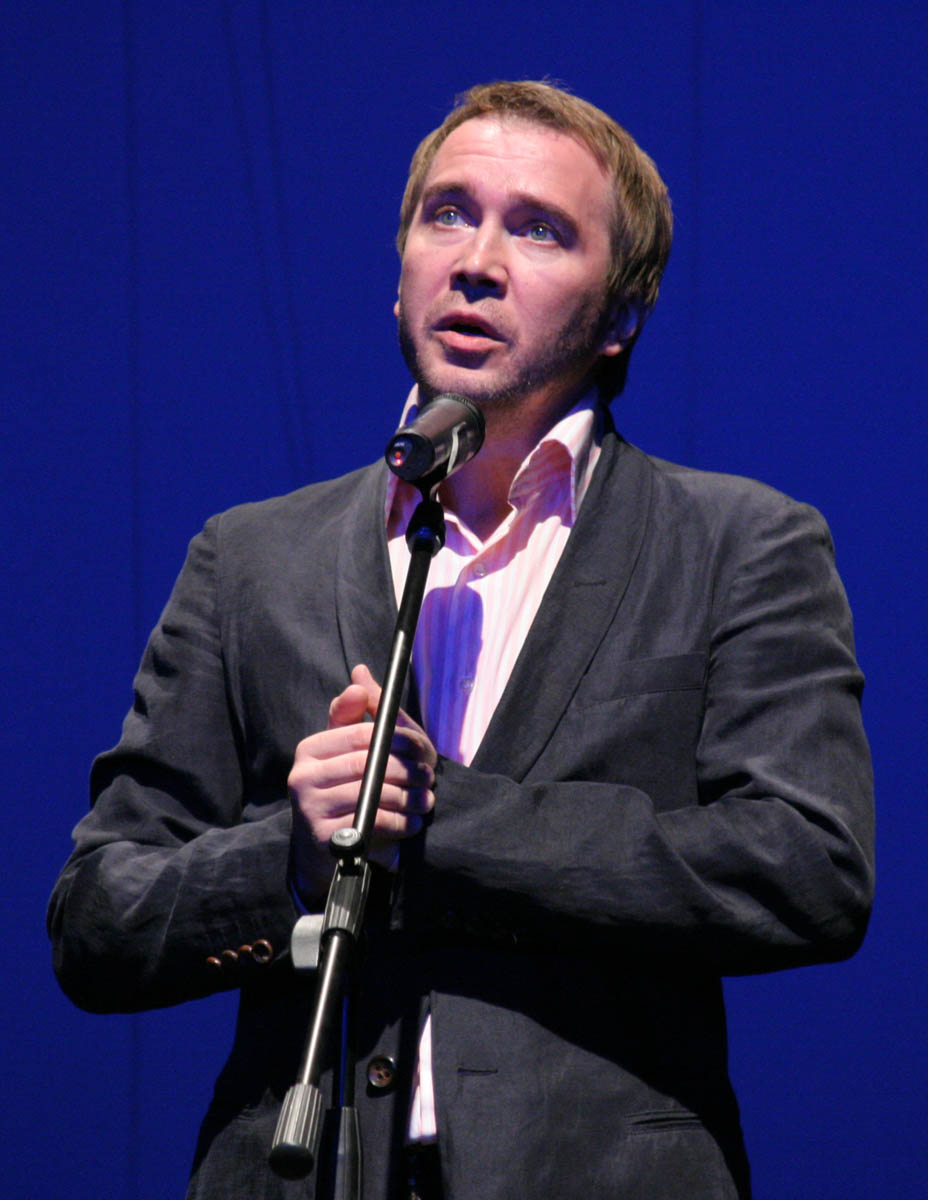
Mironov at the Saratov Drama Theatre

== Selected filmography ==
Film
Year	Title	Role	Notes
1989	Before Sunrise	lieutenant	
1990	Do It – One!	Private Recruit Alexei Gavrilov	
1991	Lost in Siberia	Volodya Mironov	
1991	Love	Sasha	
1992	How's Life, Crucians?	Nikita	(ru)
1992	Encore, Once More Encore!	Vladimir Poletaev	
1994	Limita	Misha Vulah	(ru)
1994	Burnt by the Sun	lieutenant Kolya of the tank crew	
1995	A Moslem	Kolya Ivanov the Mussulman	
1996	Inspector	Ivan Khlestakov, an official from St. Petersburg	
1999	Mother	Pavel	
2000	His Wife's Diary	Leonid Gurov	
2001	In August 1944	captain Pavel Alekhin	
2002	House of Fools	Russian officer	
2002	Turning	Gregor Samsa / insect	
2003	I have an idea…	Anton	
2004	The Nutcracker and the Mouseking	Nutcracker, aka Prince (voice)	Cartoon (ru)
2004	On Upper Maslovka Street	Petya	
2005	Escape	Evgeniy Vetrov	
2005	Dreaming of Space	Victor 'Konyok'	
2006	Piranha	Prokhor	
2008	In Transit	Andrei	
2010	Space Dogs	Venya (voice)	Сartoon movie
2010	Burnt by the Sun 2: Exodus	senior lieutenant Izyumov of the penal battalion	
2011	The Diamond Hunters	Boris Buretse	(ru)
2014	The Calculator	Ervin Kann	(ru)
2015	The Puppet Syndrome	Pyotr	(ru)
2015	The Norseman	Yevgeniy Kirillov	(ru)
2016	The Age of Pioneers	Alexei Leonov	
2017	Matilda	Director of the Imperial Theatres Ivan Karlovic	
2020	Cosmoball	White, trainer-mentor	
2020	Space Dogs: Return to Earth	Venya (rat), (voice)	
2021	Land of Legends	Baptist Jonah (Bishop of Perm)	
2022	Zhanna	Vitaliy	
2023	Nuremberg	Colonel Migachyov	

TV
Year	Title	Role	Notes
1987	Armchair	visitor bara	TV
2003	The Idiot	Prince Myshkin	TV series
2005	The First Circle	Gleb Nerzhin	miniseries
2008	Apostle	twins Petr Istomin and Pavel Istomin	TV series
2011	Dostoevsky	Fyodor Dostoyevsky	TV series
2013	Ashes	Senka Ash Thief	TV series
2021	Awake	Pavel Frolov	TV series, Russian remake of Awake

== List of theater and film awards ==
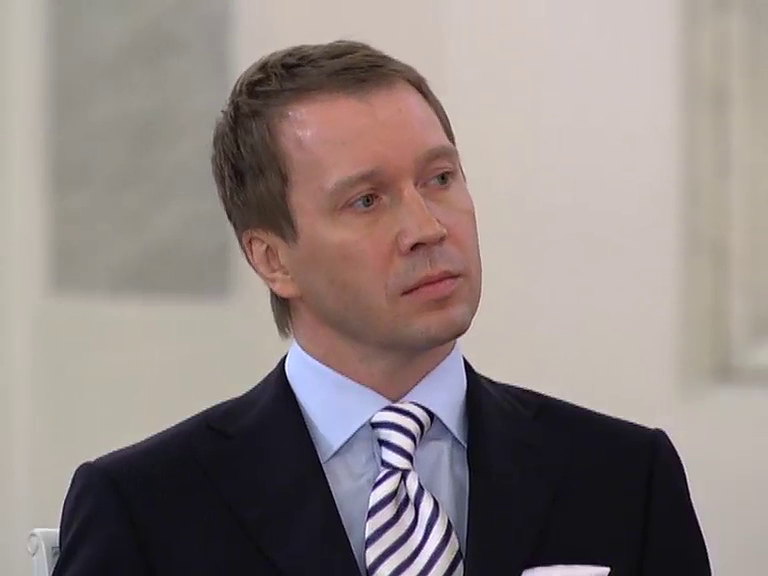
Mironov at the State Prize of the Russian Federation awards ceremony

• Best Actor Award, Kinotaur National Film Festival ("Love", 1992)
• Best Actor Award, Sozvezdie International Film Festival ("Love", 1992)
• Best Actor, Film Critics' Award ("Love", 1992)
• Grand Prix and Special Film Critics' Award, Stars of Tomorrow International Film Festival in Geneva ("Love", 1992)
• Best Actor, Film Critics' Award ("Encore Again!", 1994)
• Best Actor Award, Nika National Film Awards ("Limita", 1994)
• Best Supporting Actor Award, Sozvezdie International Film Festival ("Burnt by the Sun", 1995)
• Best Actor, Film Critics' Award ("The Moslem", 1995)
• Order of the Spiritual Administration of the Russian Moslems ("The Moslem", 1995)
• Idol, a Business Circle Award (1996)
• International Stanislavsky Award for Best Performance of the Season by a Man ("The Last Night of the Last Czar", 1997)
• The Seagull Theatrical Award ("Boris Godunov", 2000)
• Best Supporting Actor Award, Baltic Pearl International Film Actor Festival ("His Wife's Diary", 2000)
• Special Prize of The Gorky Literary Institute Scholarly Council and Terra Holdings, The National Literature and Film Festival ("His Wife's Diary", 2001)
• Special Prize of The Gorky Literary Institute Scholarly Council and Terra Holdings, The National Literature and Film Festival ("August of '44", 2001)
• The Triumph Award for Cultural Contribution (2001)
• The Seagull Theatrical Award for Best Comedy Performance of the Season ("№ 13", 2001)
• The Crystal Turandot Award for Best Performance by a Man ("№ 13", 2002)
• Man of the Year Award (2003)
• Best Actor Award at The National Literature and Film Festival ("The Metamorphosis", 2003)
• Best Actor Award, TEFI National Television Awards ("The Idiot", 2003)
• Best TV Actor Award, Golden Eagle National Film Awards ("The Idiot", 2004)
• The Aleksandr Solzhenitsyn Literary Award ("The Idiot", 2004)
• Outstanding Actor of the Year Golden Nymph Award in the Television Drama Category, the Monte Carlo Film Festival ("The Idiot", 2004)
• The Arguments and Facts Newspaper's National Pride of Russia Award for Personal Contribution to Cultural Development (2004)
• Idol, a Business Circle Award, "For Highest Service to the Acting Profession" (2005)
• The Tarkovsky Fund Award, Window to Europe National Film Festival ("On Upper Maslovka", 2005)
• Best Actor Award, Nika National Film Awards ("Dreaming of Space", 2006)
• Best Actor Award, Golden Ram National Film Critics' Festival ("Dreaming of Space", 2006)
• Russian of the Year Award (2006)
• The Crystal Turandot Award for Best Performance by a Man ("The Golovlyovs", 2006)
• The Federal Security Service's Work by an Actor Award ("August of '44", 2006)
• MTV Russian Movie Award for Best Villain in Film ("The Hunt for Piranha", 2006)
• The National Golden Mask Award for Best Performance by a Man ("The Golovlyovs", 2007)
• The Crystal Turandot Award for Best Actor ("Shukshin's Stories", 2009)
• The National Golden Mask Award for Best Performance by a Man ("Caligula", 2012)
• The Crystal Turandot Award for Best Actor ("Hamlet | Collage", 2014)
• Stanislavsky Award, Moscow International Film Festival (2024)
