= Tsoi (film) =

2020 Russian language film

- Directed by: Alexei Uchitel
- Written by: Aleksandr Gonoroviskii; Savva Minaev; Alexei Uchitel
- Produced by: Alexei Uchitel; Elena Bystrova; Filipp Pastukhov; Pavel Gorin; Kira Saksaganskaia; Gints Grube; Inese Boka-Grube
- Starring: Yevgeny Tsyganov; Maryana Spivak; Paulina Andreeva; Igor Vernik
- Cinematography: Yuri Klimenko
- Music by: Fedor Zhuravlev
- Production companies: Rock Films, Mistrus Media
- Release date: 2020
- Running time: 98 minutes
- Countries: Russia; Latvia
- Language: Russian
- Budget: 150 000 000 RUB
- Box office: 26 236 961 RUB ($353.504)

Tsoi (Russian: Цой; working title — 47) is a 2020 Russian film directed by Alexei Uchitel, a joint production of Russia, Lithuania, and Latvia. The film tells the story of how a participant in car accident that killed Viktor Tsoi carries the Tsoi's coffin from Jūrmala to Leningrad. Tsoi himself appears only at the beginning of the film, where he immediately dies in a car accident. "There isn't even Tsoi in the Tsoi", said Komsomolskaya Pravda, while a review by Argumenty i Fakty was titled "Tsoi without Tsoi".

== Plot ==
On 15 August 1990, while on vacation in Latvia, popular rock musician Viktor Tsoi died in a car accident. Tsoi's friends arrive to Latvia to accompany the coffin with the singer's body to Leningrad - producer Yuri Raizen, Tsoi's wife, with whom he actually no longer lived, Marina, along with her son Zhenya and her current boyfriend Rika, Polina (the woman with whom Tsoi recently lived) and, photographer Victoria. The names and surnames of the characters in the film do not correspond to their real prototypes. The bus driver whom Tsoi collided with is entrusted with delivering the coffin with the musician's body from Jurmala to Leningrad. The film ends with alternative shots, without the accident, which turn out to be the artist's dying dream; in them, the bus and the car pass each other safely.

== Production ==
Uchitel has previously addressed Tsoi's figure in his works. His filmography includes the documentary films Rock (one of the short stories dedicated to the musician) and The Last Hero, where Uchitel for the first time investigates the reasons behind Tsoi's death. The director calls Tsoi a continuation of that storyline, an assumption of what might have happened in August 1990. According to Uchitel, after the accident he himself saw the ill-fated bus and spoke with the investigator and the driver, Janis Fibiks.

The first mention of the project, then under the working title 47, dates back to 2017. Uchitel delayed production due to problems with his previous film Matilda, so filming began on 8 July 2019. It took place in Saint Petersburg, the Kaliningrad, Pskov oblasts, and Latvia.

Alexander Tsoi, Viktor's son, asked Uchitel to change the characters' names. According to the Uchitel, Igor Vdovin, who works with Kino on the Symphonic KINO project, refused to write music for the film.

== Cast ==
Actor	Role
Yevgeny Tsyganov	Pavel Shelest, bus driver (prototype - Ianis Fibigs)
Nadezhda Kaleganova	Viktoriia, band's photographer
Maryana Spivak	Marina, Tsoi's ex-wife (prototype - Marianna Tsoi)
Mariia Peresild	Zhenia, singer's son (prototype - Tsoi's son Alexander Tsoi)
Ilya Del	Rika, Marina's boyfriend (prototype - Alexander Ricochet Aksyonov)
Paulina Andreeva	Polina, musician's latest love (prototype - Nataliia Razlogova)
Igor Vernik	Iurii Raizen, singer's producer (prototype - Yuri Aizenshpis)
Inga Tropa	Detective Ilze Iass (prototype - Erik Ashman)
Arturs Skrastynsh	Major Tsirulis (prototype - Gunnar Tsirulis, chief of Tukumse's local police precinct investigation unit)
Vitalii Kovalenko	Lieutenant colonel Sviridov

== Release ==
The premiere was scheduled for 3 September 2020, but on 27 August it was decided to postpone the release of the film indefinitely. On 23 September, it was announced that the film was included in the competition program of the 36th Warsaw Film Festival, where the international premiere of the film took place on 12 October.

The Cinema Foundation of Russia announced financial support for the film's theatrical release as one of ten films scheduled for release in the 3rd and 4th quarters of 2020. The Russian screening of the film took place on 9 November 2020 in Moscow. The film was released in wide release on 12 November 2020.

After the release of the film, Alexander Tsoi filed a lawsuit "against film distributors for the illegal use of his father’s image in the feature film Tsoi." However, the claim was left without consideration.

== Reception ==
Alexander Tsoi, with whom Uchitel had, in his words, "thorny conversations", gave the film an assessment even before the premiere: "I have nothing good to say, and bad things will only fuel interest in this film."

Alexander Tsoi and Viktor's father Robert Tsoi, calling the film a "vulgar spectacle", turned to Vladimir Putin with a request to "organize an inspection" and "take appropriate measures". Alexander Tsoi was the request's initiator. The appeal emphasized that "neither the kin, nor the musicians of Kino, nor other rights holders and interested parties gave consent to the creators of the film Tsoi to use the name and image of the musician." Nevertheless, the film received a distribution certificate.

Rashid Nugmanov said: "Alexei renamed the title of the film from 47 to Tsoi, which is already a direct violation of the right to the image... This is open deceit, which cannot be justified by any verbiage." Uchitel himself rejects all accusations of distorting Tsoi's image.

After release, the film received mixed reviews from critics after its release on October 12, 2020 (one of the newspaper reviews was titled "Tsoi is dead"). Film critic Olga Galitskaya wrote: "A speculative, unviable idea, which Uchitel stubbornly nurtured for ten years, gave birth to an anemic, dreary movie." Rock journalist and music critic Artemy Troitsky called the film "a betrayal of the memory of the life and death of Tsoi," whereas journalist and theater critic Marina Timasheva called it “another speculation on the name.” The editor-in-chief of the Medved magazine, Boris Minayev wrote: "Tsoi is alive, but the film is not. Unlike Leto, where everyone is alive to the point of tears, although it is almost impossible to remember the plot."

Writer Platon Besedin expressed the opinion that "Uchitel has turned from a decent director into a merchant-artisan... It is very profitable, in fact, to take a name... and film who knows what, saying: what do you mean? This is a work of art, all similarities are coincidental. Okay, so be it, but why are you, you pest, using such a name, huh?"

Sound director Alexey Vishnya: "The film is about nothing... The film is not about Tsoi, it is about rock. Just not about the musical one, but about the evil one... Was it worth filming it, was it worth calling it Tsoi - the answer is obvious, in my opinion.” According to InterMedia journalist Vadim Bogdanov, the film "consists of a set of absurd coincidences, artificial characters, violation of cause-and-effect relationships, and dialogues written by a person who allegedly has never heard human speech... Alexei Uchitel just made a very bad movie." Joanna Stingray called Tsoi "some kind of absurdity, a complete fantasy about a real person."

=== Reviews ===
The problem is that the film's plot is almost entirely made up.

— Argumenty i Fakty

To be honest, the screenwriters should have their hands torn off for this... There is no need to sue anyone, there is no need to brand or ban anyone. Everyone will forget this movie in two weeks.

— Komsomolskaya Pravda

To fully appreciate Uchitel's new picture, you need not only and not so much have an idea of Tsoi's legacy (you can know nothing about him at all, that's even better) as be familiar with biblical stories.

— Izvestia
