= Vsevolod Safonov =

Soviet actor of theatre and cinema

- Born: Vsevolod Dmitrievich Safonov; 9 April 1926; Moscow, Soviet Union
- Died: 7 June 1992 (aged 66); Moscow, Russian Federation
- Occupation: Actor

Vsevolod Dmitrievich Safonov (Russian: Все́волод Дми́триевич Сафо́нов; 9 April 1926 – 6 July 1992) was a Soviet actor of theatre and cinema. He was awarded the title People's Artist of the USSR Prize (1974).

== Biography ==
Vsevolod Dmitrievich Safonov was born on 9 April 1926 in Moscow. Vsevolod's father died in his early childhood and was brought up by his mother. The family lived in а two-room apartment on the outskirts of the capital, on Surikov Street in Sokol.

As a child, Vsevolod dreamed of becoming a pilot.

When the Great Patriotic War began, Vsevolod was fifteen years old. He wanted to go to the front and enrolled in an aviation technical school, which he graduated at the end of the war, in 1945, but in a technical field and not in the flight specialty. Тo the great disappointment of Vsevolod Safonov, the medical commission did not allow him military service for health reasons.

Friends of Safonov with whom he attended an amateur theater club recommended that he try to enter a theatrical school. Vsevolod passed the difficult examination of Theater School of Shchukin and was accepted. He graduated in 1949 (course of Anna Orochko). in Moscow, and was immediately noticed by Alexander Tairov, creator and artistic director of the Kamerny Theatre and was invited to work in his troupe. Since 1950, after the closing of the Kamerny Theatre, he served in the Moscow Satire Theatre.

In 1952 he received a job at the Dramatic Theater of the Group of Soviet Forces in Germany (in East Germany), where the best young Soviet actors were sent on creative business trips. The troupe gave numerous concerts throughout Germany and played patriotic performances. While working in East Germany, Vsevolod learned German and spoke fluently on it.

After his return to the Soviet Union in 1955 he was accepted into the troupe of the Theater-Studio of the Film Actor at the Lenfilm studios in Leningrad and began actively working in Soviet cinema.

Since 1958 he served in the National Film Actors' Theatre in Moscow.

Vsevolod Safonov's first major role in cinema was of Lieutenant Yuri Kerzhentsev in the war film "Soldiers" (1956) directed by Alexander Ivanov, which brought the actor initial recognition.

Safonov became famous with the detective film The Case of the Motley (1958) directed by Nikolai Dostal, where the actor played the role of police lieutenant Sergei Korshunov, investigator of the Moscow Criminal Investigations Department.

The actor received all-union stardom in 1970 after the drama Belorussian Station directed by Andrei Smirnov appeared on the country's cinema screens, in which Safonov played the role of the Soviet journalist Alexei Kiryushin, a former front-line soldier.

Vsevolod Safonov died on July 6, 1992, at the age of sixty-six years from cancer. He was buried at the Khovanskoye Cemetery in Moscow.

== Personal life ==
He was married twice and has a daughter, well-known actress Yelena Safonova.

== Selected filmography ==
- 1951 — Far from Moscow member of a meeting (uncredited)
- 1959 — Female Age-Mates as Arkadi
- 1961 — Five Days, Five Nights as Captain Leonov
- 1963 — Silence as Pavel Matveevich Sviridov
- 1963 — An Optimistic Tragedy as Bering
- 1964 — An Easy Life as Yuri Lebedev
- 1965 — A Mother's Heart as Ivan Vladimirovich Ischersky
- 1965 — The Hyperboloid of Engineer Garin as Vasily Shelga
- 1968 — The Shield and the Sword as "Nail"
- 1970 — Belorussian station as Aleksey Konstantinovich Kiryushin
- 1972 — Taming of the Fire as Leonid Sretensky
- 1983 — Anxious Sunday as Monsieur Marcinel
- 1983 — Anna Pavlova as Vladimir Frederiks
- 1983 — Investigation Held by ZnaToKi as Anton Petrovich Bardin
- 1988 — Deja Vu as Professor Babochkin

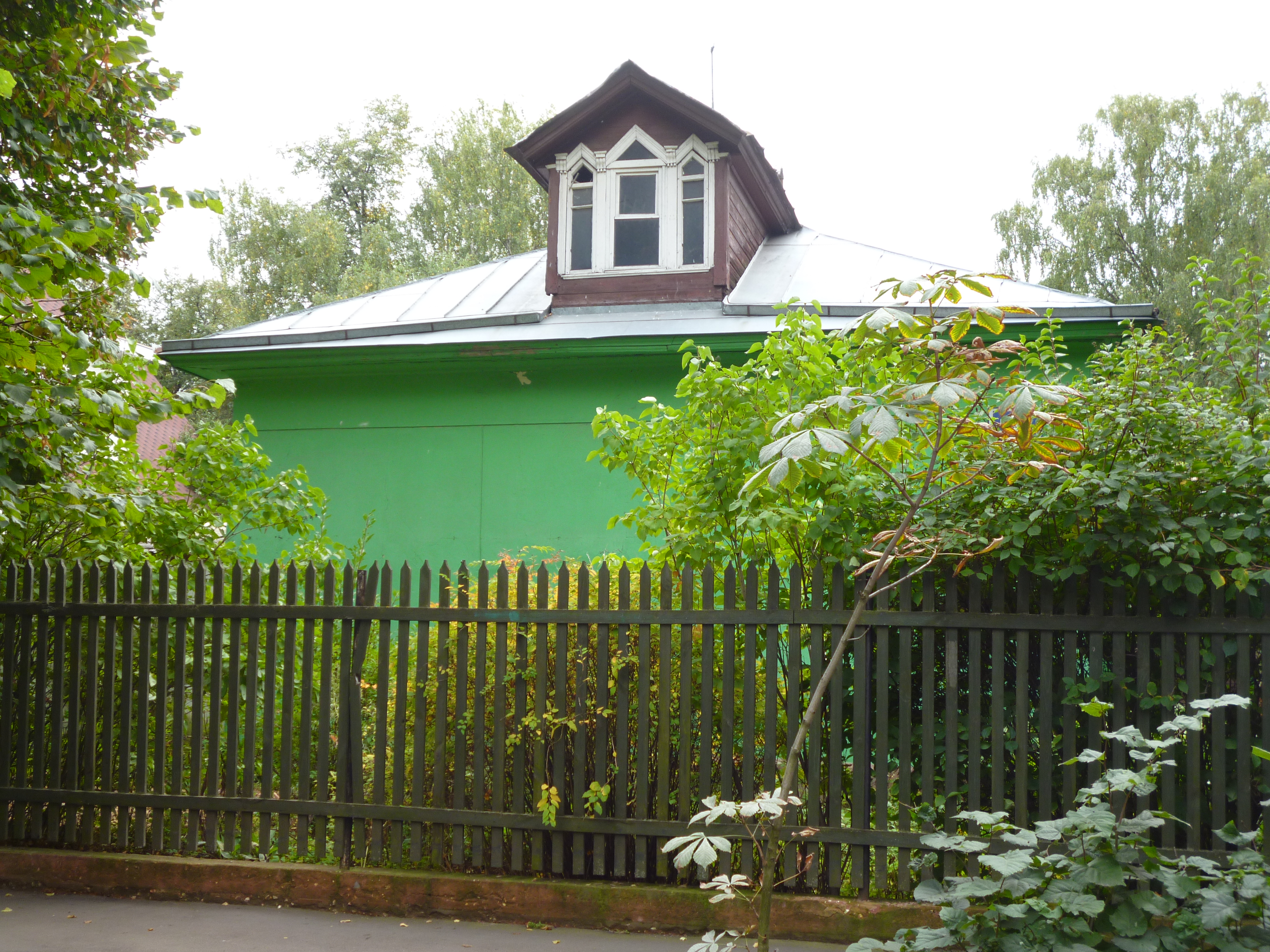
The house where Vsevolod Safonov lived in Moscow
