= Alexander Tsoi =

Russian musician (born 1985)

- Александр Цой
- Born: July 26, 1985 (age 41); Leningrad, Russian SFSR, Soviet Union
- Occupations: Musician; singer; songwriter; designer; producer
- Years active: 2008–present
- Father: Viktor Tsoi
- Musical career
- Also known as: Alexander Molchanov, Sasha Tsoi
- Origin: Saint Petersburg, Russia
- Genres: Rock; gothic rock; post-punk
- Instruments: Vocals; guitar
- Years active: 2008–present
- Labels: Maschina; Shadowplay
- Formerly of: para bellvm; Ronin
- Website: sashatsoi.band

Alexander Viktorovich Tsoi (Note: In this name that follows East Slavic naming customs, the patronymic is Viktorovich and the family name is Tsoi.) (Russian: Александр Викторович Цой), also known under the pseudonym Alexander Molchanov (Russian: Александр Молчанов; born 26 July 1985), is a Russian performer, composer, designer, former guitarist of the band "Para bellvm" and author of the video effects of the project "Symphonic Kino", and leader of the musical project Ronin.

He is the only son of Viktor Tsoi, late lead vocalist of the band Kino, and Viktor's wife, Marianna Tsoi.

== Biography ==
Alexander Tsoi was born on 26 July 1985 in Leningrad to rock musician Viktor Tsoi and his wife Marianna Tsoi. After Viktor left his wife for Natalia Razlogova, Alexander stayed to live with his mother. According to director Rashid Nugmanov, who knew Viktor Tsoi closely, his son "has a lot of his father's looks, [...] he has Vitya's plasticity".

At the age of 16, Alexander left for Moscow, where he lived and practiced web design, as well as studying English.

After Viktor's death, Marianna sued the musicians of the band Kino for the copyright to the band's songs and registered them to her son Alexander and the company Moroz Records.

In 2005, Marianna died of a brain tumor and Alexander began living with his maternal grandmother.

Alexander practically does not maintain relations with his grandfather Robert.

Later, to get rid of the attention of journalists and fans of his father, he took the pseudonym Molchanov and began playing guitar in the band "Para bellvm", where he participated in the recording of the album "The Book of Kingdoms". He was involved in the design of musical album covers. He founded the music club "da: da:".

In December 2010, he married Elena Osokina. At the same time, after the death of his wife, his grandfather, Robert, married again.

In 2010, as part of the concert "20 Years Without Kino", symphonic instrumental versions of the band's songs were performed for the first time, orchestrations were made by Igor Vdovin. Then two years of work on a full concert program continued, at this stage Kino guitarist Yuri Kasparyan joined the project, Tsoi acted as producer, and Oleg Shuntsov, who joined Kino as a session musician in 2020, was the drummer. The Symphonic Kino project was unveiled on June 21, 2012, on the 50th anniversary of Viktor's birth. In 2017, the project's debut live album "SymphoniK" was released, which is a recording of a 2015 performance at the Oktyabrsky Concert Hall in St. Petersburg. The album cover design was created by Kino's session guitarist of the second half of the 1980s Andrei Krisanov, who died in 2018 from cancer.

In 2011, according to media reports, Alexander sold the rights to the song "We'll Act Next" to Oleg Tinkov for his bank Tinkoff. In his interview, however, Alexander revealed that the rights to the song were sold without his consent by the company Musical Right, with whom he is trying to dissolve all relations in court. He has a negative attitude towards Oleg Tinkov himself.

In 2012, he gave the first detailed and open interview about his life. In that same year, he filed a lawsuit against State Duma deputy Yevgeny Fedorov, who allegedly slandered his father. However, the court found no violations in Yevgeny Fedorov's words. Fedorov quoted the opinion of the Soviet KGB officers about Viktor's work, rather than voicing his own judgment. Later, Rashid Nugmanov announced his plans to start filming the movie "Citadel of Death" based on his joint script with William Gibson (which was originally written for Viktor) and to take on the lead role of Alexander, who, in turn, supported the idea.

On 3 August 2017, he unveiled the song "Whisper" of his new solo music project, Ronin, in which he is the author, musician and vocalist. The lyrics of the song "Whisper" were written by him when he was still 18 years old. On September 3, the mini-album "Reliance" was released, which contains 5 songs. Later, Kasparyan became one of the band's members.

In 2019, Alexander proposed to organize concerts of the band "Kino", which would use Viktor's vocals from old songs, but with live music by former band members and a specially designed video sequence. It was assumed that Kino musicians – Tikhomirov, Titov and Kasparyan – would take the stage, Oleg Shuntsov (a member of the Symphonic Cinema project) would play the drum parts, and Dmitry Kezhvatov from the band "Tarakany!" would play acoustic guitar. The concerts were scheduled to take place on October 31 (St. Petersburg), November 7 (Minsk, Belarus), November 11 (Riga, Latvia), and November 21 (Moscow) 2020. Due to coronavirus restrictions, they were postponed to 2021.

He became the prototype for the character of Zhenya, Viktor's son, in Alexei Uchitel's movie Tsoi (2020). At the same time, Alexander himself made a harsh criticism of the film.

A re-recorded version of Kino's 1985 album Eto ne lyubov... was released on 15 March 2024, with Alexander noting: "The recording quality in the early 1980s did not allow for a full appreciation of these songs: you could hear all the instruments, but there was no coherent picture. After 40 years, this music is getting the sound it deserves".
