= Gisele's Mania =

- Russian: Мания Жизели
- Directed by: Aleksey Uchitel
- Written by: Dunya Smirnova
- Produced by: Aleksandr Golutva; Erkki Kivi
- Starring: Galina Tyunina; Mikhail Kozakov; Evgeniy Sidikhin; Andrei Smirnov; Sergey Vinogradov
- Cinematography: Sergei Lando
- Music by: Leonid Desyatnikov
- Release date: 1996
- Country: Russia
- Language: Russian

Gisele's Mania (Russian: Мания Жизели) is a 1996 Russian biographical drama film directed by Aleksey Uchitel.

== Plot ==
The film tells the love stories of the famous Russian ballerina Olga Spesivtseva.

== Cast ==
- Galina Tyunina as Olga Spesivtseva
- Mikhail Kozakov as Akim Volynsky
- Evgeniy Sidikhin as Boris Kaplun
- Andrei Smirnov as George Brown
- Sergey Vinogradov as Anton Dolin
- Ivan Okhlobystin as Serge Lifar
- Aleksandr Khvan
- Tatyana Moskvina as Nurse
- Aleksey German as Doctor
- Aleksandr Timofeyev
