= Dreaming of Space =

2005 film

- Film poster
- Directed by: Alexei Uchitel
- Written by: Aleksandr Mindadze
- Produced by: Anastasia Adashkin; Sergey Avrutin; Marina Gundorina; Alexei Uchitel; Philipp Pastukhov
- Starring: Yevgeny Mironov; Yevgeny Tsyganov
- Cinematography: Yuri Klimenko
- Edited by: Elena Andreeva
- Music by: Leonid Desyatnikov
- Release date: 7 July 2005
- Running time: 90 minutes
- Country: Russia
- Language: Russian

Dreaming of Space (Russian: Космос как предчувствие, romanized: Kosmos kak predchuvstvie) is a 2005 Russian drama film directed by Alexei Uchitel.

== Plot ==
The end of the 1950s. Sputnik 1 has already been launched, but there has not yet been a cosmonaut in space. The film's heroes live in a port city on the Kola Peninsula, near the border with Norway.

Victor Konkov, nicknamed "Konyok" (Yevgeny Mironov), has always wanted to become someone who can benefit humanity. He worked as a cook, loved a waitress and rode around the city on a bicycle, but at the same time he firmly believed in the great future - for him and the society.

Soon in his languid existence a mysterious man with an alien and mysterious name Herman (Eugene Tsyganov) appears. To somehow explain his strange behavior, Herman tells Konyok that across the country there is a secret selection of special people who will be later collected in Kostanay and sent into space. On one occasion Herman with delicate kisses seduces Konyok's woman - Lara (Irina Pegova). Konyok is not disheartened for long and switches to her sister Rimma (Elena Liadova). Soon Herman disappears in the Barents Sea, while trying to catch up with a Norwegian mother ship.

After that, Konyok decides to enter the institute to become a diplomat and goes with Rimma to Moscow. On the way in the train car he meets a smiling and shy young officer, Yuri. In the finale of the film it turns out that it was the future first cosmonaut Yuri Gagarin. During the grand welcome of Gagarin in Moscow, the awkward Konkov runs up to the car and hands a bouquet to the cosmonaut.

== Cast ==
- Yevgeny Mironov as Victor 'Konyok' Konkov
- Yevgeny Tsyganov as Gherman
- Irina Pegova as Lara
- Elena Lyadova as Rimma
- Sergei Kachanov as Kirych
- Mariya Kuznetsova as Victor's Mother
- Dmitriy Mulyar as Yuri
- Elena Galibina as Waitress
- Igor Shibanov as Efim

== Production ==
The film was shot in Volkhov, Syasstroy, Kronstadt, Lomonosov and Primorsk, Feodosia.

== Awards ==
Dreaming of Space won the Golden George at the 27th Moscow International Film Festival.

At the Golden Eagle Awards, the film received the awards for Best Director (Uchitel) and Best Script (Mindadze). Mironov got the award for Best Actor and Klimenko for Best Cinematography at the Nika Awards.
