= 27th Moscow International Film Festival =

Film festival

- Location: Moscow, Russia
- Founded: 1959
- Awards: Grand Prix
- Festival date: 17–26 July 2005
- Website: Website

The 27th Moscow International Film Festival was held from 17 to 26 July 2005. The Golden George was awarded to the Russian film Dreaming of Space directed by Alexei Uchitel.

== Jury ==
- Valentin Chernykh (Russia – Head of the Jury)
- Nicola Piovani (Italy)
- Ulrich Seidl (Austria)
- János Kende (Hungary)
- Viktoriya Tolstoganova (Russia)
- Claire Denis (France)

== Films in competition ==
The following films were selected for the main competition:

English title	Original title	Director(s)	Production country
Bal-Can-Can	Bal-Kan-Kan	Darko Mitrevski	Macedonia, Italy, United Kingdom
Frozen Land	Paha maa	Aku Louhimies	Finland
The Guitar Mongoloid	Gitarrmongot	Ruben Östlund	Sweden
Erkak	Erkak	Yusup Razykov	Uzbekistan
Welcome Home	Welcome Home	Andreas Gruber	Austria
Dear Wendy	Dear Wendy	Thomas Vinterberg	Denmark, Germany, France, United Kingdom
The Life That I Want	La vita che vorrei	Giuseppe Piccioni	Italy, Germany
Dreaming of Space	Kosmos kak predchuvstvie	Alexei Uchitel	Russia
Left Foot Forward on the Beat	Tabl-e bozorg zir-e pai-e chap	Kazem Ma'asoumi	Iran
Brides	Nyfes	Pantelis Voulgaris	Greece
The Last Moon	La última luna	Miguel Littín	Chile, Palestine, Mexico
The Outcome	El desenlace	Juan Pinzás	Spain
Stolen Eyes	Otkradnati ochi	Radoslav Spassov	Bulgaria, Turkey
Hassan's Smile	Le sourire d'Hassan	Frédéric Goupil	France, Syria
The Porcelain Doll	A porcelánbaba	Péter Gárdos	Hungary
Wrong Side Up	Příběhy obyčejného šílenství	Petr Zelenka	Czech Republic, Germany, Slovakia
The Chumscrubber	The Chumscrubber	Arie Posin	United States

== Awards ==
- Golden George: Dreaming of Space by Alexei Uchitel
- Special Jury Prize: Silver George: Frozen Land by Aku Louhimies
- Silver George:
  - Best Director: Thomas Vinterberg for Dear Wendy
  - Best Actor: Hamid Farrokhnezhad for Left Foot Forward on the Beat
  - Best Actress: Vesela Kazakova for Stolen Eyes
- Lifetime Achievement Award: István Szabó
- Silver George for the Best Film of the Perspective competition: How the Garcia Girls Spent Their Summer by Georgina Riedel
- Stanislavsky Award: Jeanne Moreau
