= Andreas Gruber (director) =

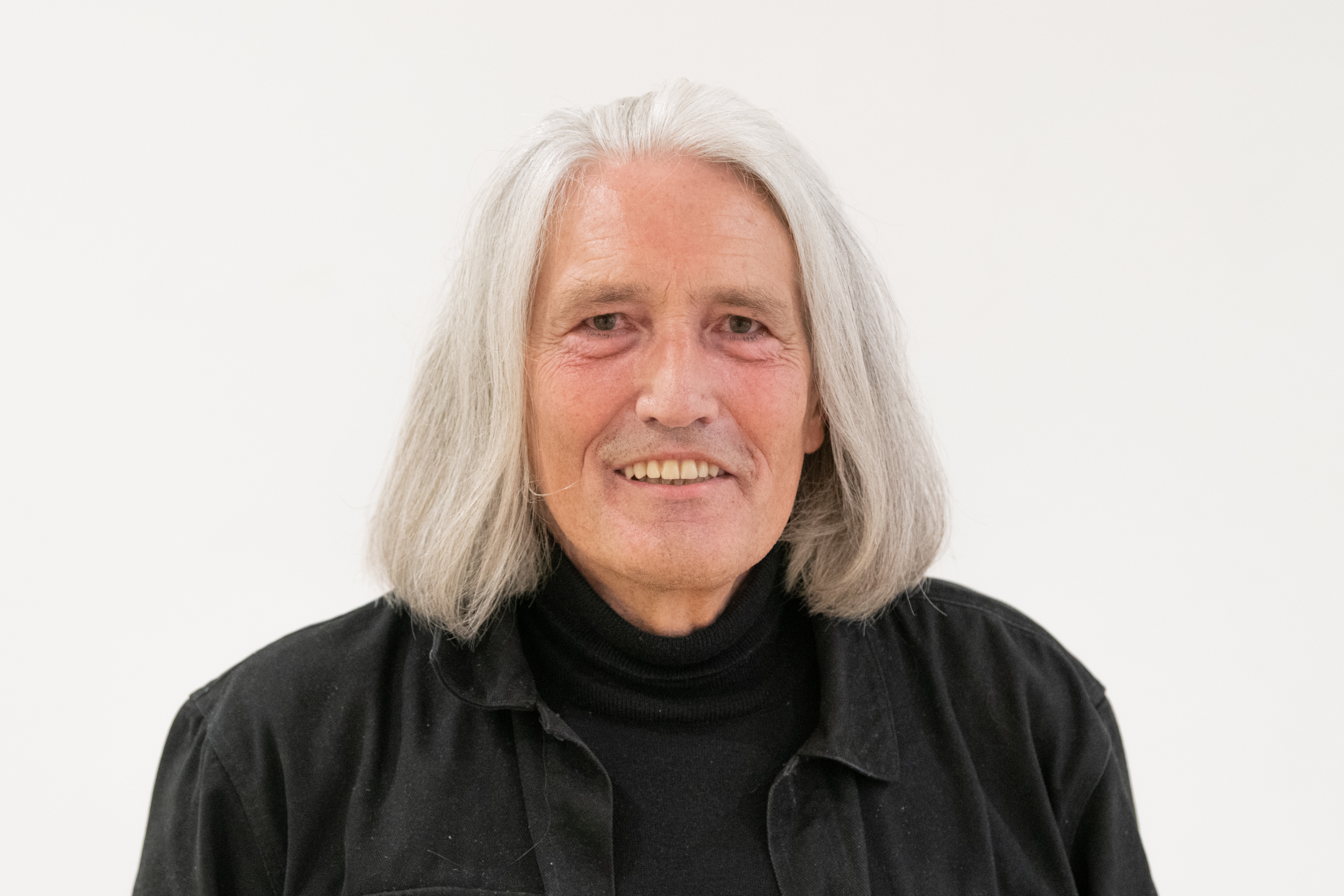
- Born: 2 November 1954 (age 71); Wels, Austria
- Occupations: Film director, screenwriter
- Years active: 1983-present

Andreas Gruber (born 2 November 1954) is an Austrian screenwriter and director of both television and film.

From 1974 to 1982 he studied screenwriting and directing at the Hochschule für Musik und darstellende Kunst in Vienna. In 1979 he was directing assistant to Axel Corti. In 2000 he won the Golden Romy for best directing. His 2004 film Welcome Home was entered into the 27th Moscow International Film Festival. He teaches at the University of Television and Film Munich, Germany.

== Filmography ==
- 1983 Drinnen & draußen. TV-Film. Screenplay and directing.
- 1989 Schalom, General. TV-Film. Screenplay and directing.
- 1991 Erste Wahrnehmung. TV-Film. Screenplay and directing.
- 1994 Hasenjagd – Vor lauter Feigheit gibt es kein Erbarmen. (English title: The Quality of Mercy) Screenplay and directing.
- 2004 Welcome Home. Film. Screenplay and directing.

== Scouting ==
He was 20 years a member of the Scout group in Wels. He also was a Scout Leader. He said that his time in Scouting was a very important time for him.
