= The Stroll (2003 film) =

2003 film

- Film poster
- Directed by: Alexei Uchitel
- Written by: Dunya Smirnova
- Produced by: Alexei Uchitel; Filipp Pastukhov; Kira Saksaganskaya
- Starring: Irina Pegova; Pavel Barshak; Yevgeny Tsyganov
- Cinematography: Yuri Klimenko; Pavel Kostomarov
- Edited by: Yelena Andreyeva
- Distributed by: Roskinoprokat
- Release date: 20 June 2003
- Running time: 90 minutes
- Country: Russia
- Language: Russian

The Stroll (Russian: Прогулка, translit. Progulka) is a 2003 Russian romantic drama film directed by Alexei Uchitel. It was entered into the 25th Moscow International Film Festival.

== Plot ==
While Olya, a young woman in her twenties, is walking through Saint Petersburg, she meets Alexey (Alyosha), who starts chatting with her, flirting, and quickly befriends her. Olya, who enjoys imagining scenarios and making up stories, agrees to go with Alexey to Moscow but insists on paying for her own ticket. Alexey soon falls for her and believes she feels the same. He introduces her to his close friend Petya, who joins them, but Olya confides to Petya that she's unsure about going to Moscow with Alexey and finds Petya more mature. As Olya and Petya become friendly, Alexey grows jealous, asking Petya not to interfere, but Petya asserts that Olya might be better suited to him. Tensions rise, leading to a fistfight between the friends, which Olya mediates. Afterwards, they continue walking and chatting. At a shelter, Olya reflects on their meeting as a stroke of luck, imagining them in an adventure novel and casting Alexey as the hero. She compliments Petya's strength and charms both men, hinting at feelings for both.

Olya then brings them to a bowling alley where Vsevolod, her fiancé, is waiting. While she changes out of her wet clothes, Alexey and Petya are stunned to learn she’s engaged to be married in a week and had spent the day with them to prove she could walk all day without sitting, fulfilling a bet. Alexey tells Vsevolod he’s lost more than a bet, though he doesn’t elaborate. When Olya returns, she confirms her actions were just for the bet, leaving Alexey and Petya hurt and disillusioned, realizing her affections were just part of the game. She insists she was honest, but they are too upset to listen and leave. As she watches them go, Vsevolod tries to comfort her, but she’s struck by the realization of the pain she’s caused and suddenly runs after them.

== Cast ==
- Irina Pegova as Olya
- Pavel Barshak as Alyosha
- Yevgeny Tsyganov as Petya
- Yevgeni Grishkovetz as Seva
- Karen Badalov as groom
- Madlen Dzhabrailova as gypsy on the tram
- Andrey Kazakov as episode
- Aleksey Kolubkov as wedding participant
- Mikhail Krylov as police sergeant
- Sergei Puskepalis as accident participant
- Yuri Stepanov as accident participant
- Kseniya Kutepova as Catherine the Great
- Polina Kutepova as Elizabeth of Russia
- Galina Tyunina as tour desk worker
