= Yuri Stepanov (actor) =

Russian actor (1967–2010)

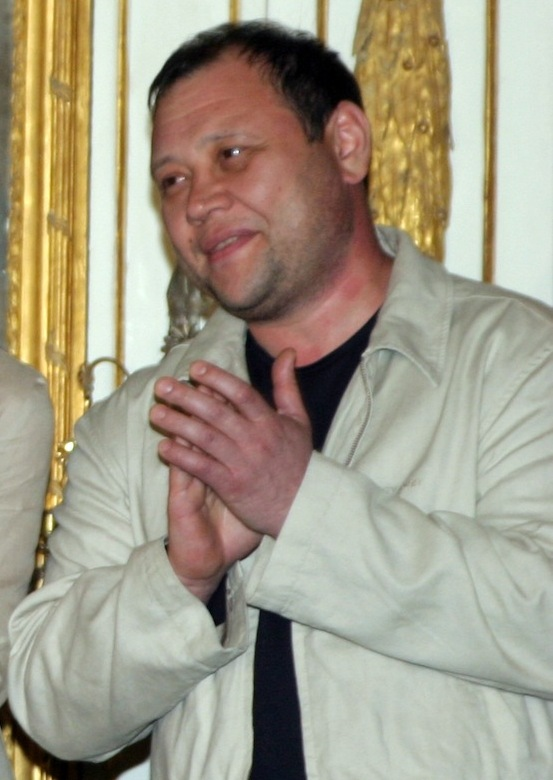
- Stepanov in 2004
- Born: 7 June 1967; Rysevo, Irkutsk Oblast, Russian SFSR, Soviet Union
- Died: 3 March 2010 (aged 42); Moscow, Russia
- Occupation: Actor
- Spouse: Irina Stepanova
- Children: 3

Yuri Konstantinovich Stepanov (Russian: Ю́рий Константи́нович Степа́нов; 7 June 1967 – 3 March 2010) was a Russian film and theatre actor who worked at the Theater workshop of Pyotr Fomenko. He was a winner of several theatrical awards and appeared in productions of the Pyotr Fomenko Workshop, as well as a number of television series.

== Death ==
Stepanov died in a car accident in Moscow on 3 March 2010.

== Filmography ==
Year	Title	Role	Notes
1991	Povesti Belkina. Grobovshchik		
1995	Oryol i reshka	Gerasim	
1995	Maniya Zhizeli		
1998	Vremya tantsora	Valeriy Belosheikin	
1998	Privet ot Charli-trubacha		
2000	Dnevnik ego zheny		
2000	His Wife's Diary		
2000	Moskva	Surgeon	
2000	House for the Rich	Serafim Pukhov	
2002	War	Aleksandr Matrosov	
2002	Spartak i Kalashnikov		
2003	The Stroll		
2003	A poutru oni prosnulis	Kolya	
2005	Dead Man's Bluff	Boar	
2005	Pervyy posle Boga	Boatsman Podoprigora	
2007	Gruz 200	Mikhail, Colonel	
2007	Actress	Vikentiy	
2008	Igra	Zvonov	
2008	Wild Field	Fyodor Abramovich	
2009	Probka		
2009	V Parizh!	Ivan Nikolaevich	
2009	Kromov	Samarin	
2010	Ne nado pechalitsya	Andrey Tyukha	
2010	Chelovek s bulvara Kaputsinok		
