= Welcome Home (2004 film) =

2004 film

- Directed by: Andreas Gruber
- Written by: Martin Rauhaus; Andreas Gruber
- Produced by: Veit Heiduschka
- Starring: Wolfgang S. Zechmayer
- Cinematography: Hermann Dunzendorfer
- Distributed by: Buena Vista International
- Release dates: October 2004 (Germany); 18 March 2005 (Austria)
- Running time: 98 minutes
- Countries: Austria; Germany
- Language: German

Welcome Home is a 2004 Austrian comedy film directed by Andreas Gruber. It was entered into the 27th Moscow International Film Festival.

== Cast ==
- Wolfgang S. Zechmayer as Coach
- Jaymes Butler as Ghana Police Officer
- Emmanuel Abankwa as Market Security Man
- Joseph Allruist Win
- Fred Nii Amugi as Black doctor
- Nina Blum as Karin
- Hemma Clementi as Petra
- Stephanie Commings as Librarian
