= Eimuntas Nekrošius =

Lithuanian theatre director (1952–2018)

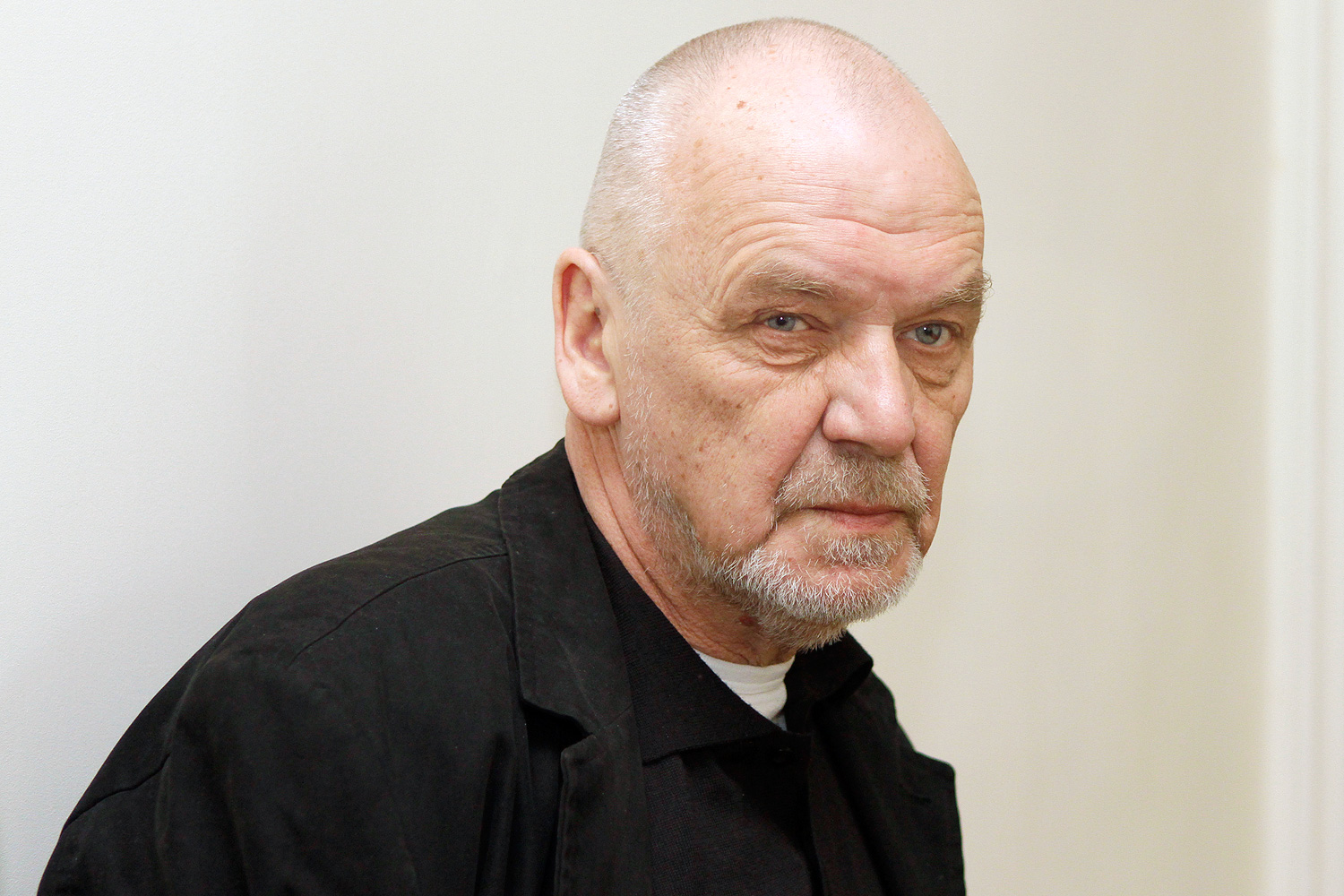
- Nekrošius in 2010
- Born: 21 November 1952; Pažobris village, Raseiniai district municipality, Lithuanian SSR, Soviet Union
- Died: 20 November 2018 (aged 65); Vilnius, Lithuania
- Occupation: Theatre director
- Years active: 1979-2018

Eimuntas Nekrošius (November 21, 1952 – November 20, 2018) was a Lithuanian theatre director.

== Biography ==
=== Early life ===
Nekrošius was born in Pažobris village, Raseiniai district municipality, Lithuanian SSR on November 21, 1952.

=== Career ===
In 1978, Nekrošius graduated from Lunacharsky Institute of Theatre Arts in Moscow. After returning to Lithuania Nekrošius has been working in the Vilnius State Youth Theatre from 1978 until 1979. In 1979, he moved to the Kaunas State Drama Theatre, where he stayed for a year until 1980. 1980, he returned to Vilnius State Youth Theatre, where he staged series of notable plays. In 1998 he founded a theatre Meno fortas (Fortress of Art). From 2012 to 2013, E.Nekrošius worked as an art director in Teatro Olimpico, Vicenza. Just before his sudden death he was working on production of Edipo a Colono by Ruggero Cappuccio which was planned to be shown in Amphitheatre of Pompeii.

Between 1988 and 1992 he worked and staged performances in many countries - Austria, Yugoslavia, Italy, Finland, Israel, Norway, Sweden, Switzerland, and the United States.

Among the features characteristic to his plays are the soothing background music of a repetitive pattern throughout the performance, extensive use of dance and movement and unique props on stage, as well as an employment of natural substances as water, fire, wind, ice and stone. The length of a single performance often exceeds conventional viewing time since Nekrošius favours complex and challenging pieces to stage, such as the Song of Songs or The Seasons by Kristijonas Donelaitis. According to Nekrošius, a production, must not only speak, but it must do so on several levels, using multiple systems of meaning, in concert, to achieve a cumulative, unified effect.

In 1994 he was awarded the Europe Prize Theatrical Realities, in Taormina, Italy, «for the dramaturgic work of elaboration of plays staged with the actors of the Theatre of Vilnius».

=== Death ===
On November 20, 2018, Nekrošius died in Vilnius, Lithuania, at the age of 65.

== Notable plays ==
- The Square (1980)
- Pirosmani, Pirosmani... (1981)
- Rock opera Love and Death in Verona by Sigitas Geda and Kęstutis Antanėlis’ (1982, renewed in 1996)
- The Day Lasts More Than a Hundred Years by Chinghiz Aitmatov (1983)
- Uncle Vanya by Anton Chekhov (1986)
- The Nose by Nikolai Gogol(1991)
- Little Tragedies by Aleksandr Pushkin
- Hamlet by William Shakespeare (1997)
- Macbeth (2002)
- The Children of Rosenthal (2005)
- Johann Wolfgang Goethe's Faust (2006)
- The Idiot by Fyodor Dostoevsky (2009)
- Caligula by Albert Camus (2011)
- Divine Comedy by Dante Alighieri (2012)
- Paradise by Dante Alighieri (2013)
- The Book of Job based on The Old Testament (2014)
- Dziady by Adam Mickiewicz (2016)

== Awards and nominations ==
Plays by Nekrošius were awarded diplomas of various theatre festivals in Lithuania, Latvia, Estonia, Russia and other countries. Nekrošius is a laureate of numerous state awards.

- 1994, Nekrošius received a special prize of the Lithuanian Theatre Union as the Best Director of the Year, and the Baltic Assembly Prize for Literature, the Arts and Science for Aleksandr Pushkin's Little Tragedies (Mozart and Salieri. Don Juan. Plague) as the best theatre performance in the Baltic States.
- 1994, Nekrošius received the II Europe Prize Theatrical Realities.
- 1997, Nekrošius produced one of his most successful directions — Hamlet by William Shakespeare, starring Lithuanian music idol Andrius Mamontovas. The play took part in nearly all main European theatre festivals and received numerous awards including Lithuanian National Prize.
- 1997, Nekrošius received prestigious polish prize for directors — Konrad Swinarski Award of Teatr, polish theatre monthly journal — for Hamlet.
- November 2002, Nekrošius produced Giuseppe Verdi's opera Macbeth at Teatro Comunale Florence.
- In 2001, Nekrošius received the prestigious international Konstantin Stanislavski's award in Moscow.
- In 2005, he received the Herder Prize. In January 2008, Italian theater critics gave to Nekrošius' staged play Faust the Ubu Award for the best foreign production in Italy, a third one in Nekrošius carrier.
- 2008, Nekrosius received the third Honorary Award of the 16th International Istanbul Theater Festival

== Bibliography ==
- (In Lithuanian) Marcinkevičiūtė, R. (2002). Eimuntas Nekrošius. Vilnius: Scena. ISBN 9789986412205

== See also ==
- List of famous Lithuanians
