= Break Loose =

2013 Russian crime drama film

- Film poster
- Directed by: Alexei Uchitel
- Written by: Alexander Mindadze; Zakhar Prilepin; Yulia Pankosyanova (Klimenko)
- Based on: The Eight by Zakhar Prilepin
- Produced by: Alexei Uchitel
- Starring: Artur Smolyaninov; Vilma Kutaviciute; Aleksey Mantsygin; Alexander Novin; Artyom Bystrov; Pavel Vorozhtsov; Sergei Puskepalis
- Cinematography: Yuri Klimenko; Alexander Demyanenko
- Production company: TPO Rock
- Release dates: 7 September 2013 (TIFF); 8 May 2014 (Russia)
- Running time: 85 minutes
- Country: Russia
- Language: Russian
- Budget: $4 million

Break Loose (also known as Breaking Loose; Russian: Восьмёрка, literally "The Eight", a nickname for the Lada Samara model VAZ-2108) is a 2013 Russian crime drama film directed by Alexei Uchitel. It is based on the novella The Eight by Russian writer Zakhar Prilepin, who also appears in a cameo role in the film.

The film premiered in the Contemporary World Cinema section at the 2013 Toronto International Film Festival. Its Russian premiere took place at the 2nd National Debut Film Festival "Dvizhenie" in Omsk in April 2014, where it opened the festival.

The film's tagline was "Love without brakes".

In July 2014, in the context of the War in Donbas, the state film agency of Ukraine banned Break Loose along with a number of other Russian films deemed to be "glorifying the Russian army and security forces".

== Plot ==
Set in the final days of 1999 on the eve of the New Year, the film follows four young OMON officers—Gera, Shorokh, Lykov and Grekh—in a provincial Russian city. After a violent confrontation with striking factory workers, the group becomes entangled in a conflict with a powerful local crime boss, Buts. Gera unexpectedly falls in love with the crime boss's girlfriend, escalating a cycle of retaliation and violence.

Unbeknownst to the characters, President Boris Yeltsin is preparing his resignation speech, and Russia is about to enter a new era.

== Cast ==
- Aleksey Mantsygin as Gera
- Vilma Kutaviciute as Aglaya
- Artur Smolyaninov as "Buts", a crime boss
- Alexander Novin as Lykov
- Artyom Bystrov as "Grekh" ("Sin")
- Pavel Vorozhtsov as "Shorokh"
- Sergei Puskepalis as OMON commander
- Irina Pegova as Marina, Grekh's wife
- Zakhar Prilepin as taxi driver (cameo)
- Yulia Peresild as club singer
- Alexander Bashirov as bandit

== Production ==
=== Development ===
Director Alexei Uchitel read Zakhar Prilepin’s novella The Eight before its publication and decided to adapt it. Although Prilepin declined to write the screenplay himself, he participated in casting discussions and contributed to details of the adaptation.

=== Filming ===
Filming took place in Kronstadt and at the Kirov Plant in Saint Petersburg. The plant’s industrial grounds provided a large, atmospheric location suitable for night shoots.

The production involved fifty real OMON officers as extras. A large crowd scene, in which OMON holds back protesters, was filmed semi-documentary style with 700 extras instructed to break through the police cordon.

Primary cinematography was done by acclaimed Russian cinematographer Yuri Klimenko, with Alexander Demyanenko operating the second camera.

== Reception ==
Critic Anton Dolin praised the film's energy, cinematography and casting, calling it one of Uchitel’s strongest works and “pure adrenaline”.

Other critics were more mixed, noting tension between Prilepin’s violent source material and Uchitel’s attempt to elevate the film beyond typical crime-genre tropes.

Some critics highlighted what they saw as a militaristic or macho tone in the depiction of OMON officers.
