= Erkak =

2005 film

- Directed by: Yusup Razykov
- Starring: Elnur Abraev; Lola Eltoeva
- Release date: July 2005 (Moscow)
- Running time: 77 minutes
- Country: Uzbekistan
- Language: Uzbek

Erkak is a 2005 Uzbekistani drama film directed by Yusup Razykov. It was entered into the 27th Moscow International Film Festival.

== Cast ==
- Elnur Abraev - Jamshid
- Lola Eltaeva - Mastura
- Farhad Abdullayev
- Alisher Otobaev
- Zebo Navruzova
- and others
