= His Wife's Diary =

- Directed by: Alexei Uchitel
- Written by: Dunya Smirnova
- Produced by: Alexander Golutva; Natalia Smirnova; Alexei Uchitel
- Starring: Andrei Smirnov; Galina Tyunina; Olga Budina; Yevgeny Mironov
- Cinematography: Yuri Klimenko
- Edited by: Elena Andreeva
- Music by: Leonid Desyatnikov
- Production company: Rock Films
- Release date: 2000
- Running time: 110 minutes
- Country: Russia
- Language: Russian

His Wife's Diary (Russian: Дневник его жены, romanized: Dnevnik ego zheny) is a 2000 Russian biographical film directed by Alexei Uchitel. It is a story about the last love affair of Ivan Bunin (played by Andrei Smirnov). It is set in French Riviera in the 1940s.

His Wife's Diary was awarded the Grand Prize of the Kinotavr Festival and the 2000 Nika Award for Best Film, Best Male Actor (Smirnov) and Best Cinematography (Klimenko). It was Russia's submission to the 73rd Academy Awards for the Academy Award for Best Foreign Language Film, but was not accepted as a nominee.

== Plot ==
A tragic story of love and loneliness – this is the unknown life of the Russian writer Ivan Bunin. The love story that involved Bunin, his wife Vera, the young poet Galina Plotnikova, opera singer Marga Kovtun and literary man Leonid Gurov.

== Cast ==
- Andrei Smirnov as Ivan Bunin
- Galina Tyunina as Vera Bunina
- Olga Budina as Galina Plotnikova
- Yevgeny Mironov as Leonid Gurov
- Elena Morozova as Marga Kovtun
- Dani Kogan as Zhanna
- Yuri Stepanov as a guest at the reception

== See also ==
- List of submissions to the 73rd Academy Awards for Best Foreign Language Film
- List of Russian submissions for the Academy Award for Best Foreign Language Film
