= Before Sunrise (1989 film) =

1989 Soviet action film

- Russian: Перед рассветом
- Directed by: Yaropolk Lapshin
- Written by: Gennadi Bokarev
- Starring: Valeri Ryzhakov; Aleksandr Pankratov-Chyorny; Yevgeny Mironov; Oleg Korchikov; Konstantin Stepankov
- Cinematography: Anatoliy Lesnikov
- Music by: Eduard Artemyev
- Release date: 1989
- Running time: 85 minute
- Country: Soviet Union
- Language: Russian

Before Sunrise (Russian: Перед рассветом) is a 1989 Soviet action war film directed by Yaropolk Lapshin.

== Plot ==
The film takes place in the summer of 1941. A young lieutenant of the NKVD, together with a group of political prisoners and criminals, comes under fire, as a result of which only three survived.

== Cast ==
- Valeri Ryzhakov as Kolya
- Aleksandr Pankratov-Chyorny
- Yevgeny Mironov
- Oleg Korchikov
- Konstantin Stepankov as Nevolin
- Vyacheslav Kirilichev as Efim
- Raisa Ryazanova as Lesnichikha
- Igors Varpa
- Viktor Uralskiy
- Igor Golovin as Perevodchik
