= Belorussian Station =

- Directed by: Andrei Smirnov
- Written by: Vadim Trunin
- Starring: Yevgeny Leonov; Anatoli Papanov; Vsevolod Safonov; Aleksey Glazyrin; Nina Urgant
- Cinematography: Pavel Lebeshev
- Music by: Alfred Schnittke (absent in the titres)
- Production company: Mosfilm
- Release date: 30 April 1971
- Running time: 101 minutes
- Country: Soviet Union
- Language: Russian

Belorussian Station (Russian: Белорусский вокзал, romanized: Belorusski vokzal) is a 1971 Soviet drama film directed by Andrei Smirnov. The film is famous for the song "We Need Only One Victory", with lyrics written by poet Bulat Okudzhava.

== Plot ==
In the summer of 1945, a group of former comrades-in-arms parted ways at Belorussky Station after World War II, having last gathered in 1946 to celebrate the birthday of their former commander, Valentin Matveev. Now, over twenty years later in 1970, they reunite in Moscow to bid farewell to Matveev, who has passed away. The tense atmosphere of the funeral, complicated by the widow’s emotional distress, leaves them unable to properly honor their friend’s memory. The four men—now leading very different lives as a factory director, chief accountant, journalist, and municipal repairman—find themselves wandering Moscow in search of a quiet place to reminisce. While contending with everyday responsibilities and interruptions, they recall the solidarity and sacrifices of their wartime bond, revealing layers of their characters and unshaken loyalty to their friendships. Their late commander’s memory serves as a moral compass throughout, a constant reminder of their shared past.

The film culminates at the home of Raya, a former battalion nurse who initially doesn’t recognize them. Upon hearing of Matveev’s death, she gathers her strength to sing their cherished song, honoring the memory of the "unbreakable" 10th Airborne Battalion of the 1st Belorussian Front. The narrative poignantly contrasts the outlooks and values of these veterans with the younger generation, depicting a post-war world where no battle scenes are shown, and shots are only heard in the form of the farewell salute at the cemetery. Without a single scene of wartime action, Andrei Smirnov’s film is widely regarded as one of the most profound works about World War II, capturing the emotional depth and enduring significance of their wartime experiences.

== Writing and filming ==
The original script written in 1966 by Vadim Trunin was significantly different from the final one shot in the film. In it, young people at the restaurant would begin to mock the four veterans, and a fight would ensue. The former paratroopers would easily come out of it victorious, but the police called to the scene would take the side of the young people (one of whom had influential parents). The police would try to arrest the four friends but instead become victims themselves.

Film director Andrei Smirnov had been picking actors for this film for a very long time. Thus, the role of the director of the plant Kharlamov was auditioned for by Mikhail Ulyanov and even Eldar Ryazanov. Nikolay Rybnikov wanted to play the role of the simple locksmith, but Yevgeny Leonov was stronger in the screen test. The character of accountant Dubinsky was conceived as an analogue to Aramis, who would be played by the "classic" intellectual – Innokenty Smoktunovsky or Nikolai Grinko. As a result, Andrei Smirnov chose Anatoly Papanov, who surprisingly combined softness and sentimentality with brutality and power.

Mosfilm management approved Inna Makarova for the role of the former nurse Raisa, but upon Smirnov's insistence Nina Urgant was cast in the role.

== Music ==
The lyrics of the song "We Need Only One Victory" were written by Bulat Okudzhava at the request of director Andrei Smirnov. The music was also written by Okudzhava and adopted by Alfred Schnittke in the form of a march to be played at the military parades on Victory Day (9 May). During the filming of the finale Smirnov asked Nina Urgant not to cry when she sings. She managed to do it only after several attempts.

== Cast ==
- Yevgeny Leonov as Ivan Prikhodko, locksmith, former military intelligence commander
- Anatoli Papanov as Nikolai I. Dubinsky, accountant, former military radioman
- Vsevolod Safonov as Aleksey K. Kirushin, journalist, a former miner
- Aleksey Glazyrin as Viktor S. Kharlamov, director of the plant, a former sapper
- Nina Urgant as Raisa, former nurse
- Raisa Kurkina as Lidia A. Matveeva, widow of the Valentin Matveev, former comrade-in-arms of main characters
- Lyubov Sokolova as Luba Prikhodko, Ivan Prikhodko's wife
- Nikifor Kolofidin as gen. Andrey A. Puhov, Lidia Matveeva's father
- Yuri Orlov as Vladimir Matveev, Lidia Matveeva's son
- Nikolai Volkov as director of the plant, Nikolai Dubinsky's chief
- Aleksandr Janvarjov as driver Sasha, owner of the car Moskvitch
- Margarita Terekhova as Natasha Shipilova, Sasha's girlfriend
- Valentina Anan'ina as Katya, housekeeper in Matveev family
- Ludmila Arinina as doctor
- Yuri Vizbor as Balashov, chief-engineer
- Yuri Volyntsev as police sergeant
- Vladimir Grammatikov as Grisha, Kharlamov's driver
- Valeri Malyshev as police lieutenant
- Viktor Proskurin as Petr, Ivan Prikhodko's young colleague
- Elena Skachkova as Raisa's daughter

== Awards ==
- Award at the Karlovy Vary International Film Festival (1971)
