= Captive (2008 film) =

- Poster
- Russian: Пленный
- Directed by: Alexei Uchitel
- Written by: Vladimir Makanin; Timofei Dekin
- Produced by: Alexei Uchitel
- Starring: Vyacheslav Krikunov; Peter Logachev; Irakli Mskhalaia; Yulia Peresild; Raisa Gichaeva
- Cinematography: Yuri Klimenko
- Music by: Leonid Desyatnikov
- Production companies: TPO Rock; Camera Studio
- Release date: September 5, 2008
- Running time: 80 minutes
- Countries: Russia; Bulgaria
- Languages: Russian; Chechen

Captive (Russian: Пленный, romanized: Plenyy) is a 2008 Russian-Bulgarian film by Alexei Uchitel on the novel by Vladimir Makanin, Caucasian Captive. The working title of the film was also Caucasian Captive.

Premiere of the film took place September 5, 2008 in St. Petersburg. The Russian film movie came out September 11, 2008.

== Plot ==
The film takes place in the summer of 2000, during the Chechen War. Two Russian soldiers are instructed to call for help for the army column that fell under fire and left unattended. During the assignment, they take a prisoner of the Chechen youth Jamal. Apparently unadapted for the burdens of war, the young man evokes sympathy from the elder of the soldiers, Rubakhin. As a result of a failed exchange of prisoners of war in a Chechen village, soldiers are forced to hide in thickets surrounded by companies of militants seeking Jamal, and Rubakhin is forced to strangle a Chechen boy to stop his attempts to attract attention.

== Awards and nominations ==
Among other awards and nominations in international film festivals, the film was nominated for the Crystal Globe at the 43rd Karlovy Vary International Film Festival and Alexei Uchitel won the Best Director Award for it.

== See also ==
- Prisoner of the Mountains
