= Here's to You and Us! =

- Directed by: Andrei Smirnov
- Written by: Andrei Smirnov
- Produced by: Andrei Smirnov
- Starring: Yuliya Snigir; Aleksandr Ustyugov; Aleksandr Kuznetsov; Andrey Smolyakov; Irina Rozanova; Leonid Yarmolnik; Galina Tyunina; Marina Kleshchyova
- Cinematography: Sergei Medvedev
- Edited by: Alla Strelnikova
- Production companies: Marmot Film; Kinoprime
- Distributed by: The Movie Universe
- Release dates: May 26, 2023 (World and Online Film Premiere)
- Running time: 150 min.
- Country: Russia
- Language: Russian

Here's to You and Us! (Russian: За нас с вами!, romanized: Za nas s vami!) is a 2023 Russian drama film directed by Andrei Smirnov. It stars Yuliya Snigir, Aleksandr Ustyugov and Aleksandr Kuznetsov.

== Plot ==
The film takes place in Moscow between late 1952 and early 1953, during Stalin’s final months and the height of the anti-Semitic "Doctors’ Plot." At the center is the Petkevich family, Polish-Russian intellectuals living in a communal apartment on Bolshaya Pirogovka. This shared space reflects the societal tensions of the era, as class, ideology, and ethnicity collide.

Philosophy professor Pavel Kazimirovich (Andrey Smolyakov), openly critical of Marxism, and his aristocratic wife Angelina Fedorovna (Irina Rozanova) struggle to adapt to Soviet life. Their daughter Dina (Yuliya Snigir), a bright and beautiful woman, marries Boris (Alexander Ustyugov), a Communist metro construction worker and war veteran. Boris's arrival into the family introduces ideological and personal conflicts, highlighting the broader clash between the old and new Soviet order.

The communal apartment is home to a diverse group of residents, including a Jewish doctor (Leonid Yarmolnik) and his family, who must navigate the pervasive anti-Semitism of the era. Political tensions rise as arrests, betrayals, and acts of survival unfold, culminating in the arrest of Pavel. Boris is accused of betraying his father-in-law, leading to his estrangement from the family.

Amid the grim backdrop, moments of connection and hope emerge. Dina encounters Ivan (Alexander Kuznetsov), an MGB officer with a tragic past, sparking a brief romance that hints at the possibility of renewal. The film ends with Stalin’s death, suggesting the beginning of a societal awakening, even as the scars of oppression linger.

== Cast ==
- Yuliya Snigir as Dina
- Aleksandr Ustyugov as Boris
- Aleksandr Kuznetsov as Ivan
- Andrey Smolyakov as Pyotr Petkevich
- Irina Rozanova as Angelina Fyodorovna
- Leonid Yarmolnik as Dorfman
- Galina Tyunina as Ester Davydovna
- Marina Kleshchyova as Klava
- Evdokiya Germanova as Evstolya Dmitrievna
