= Big Drum Under Left Foot =

Big drum under left foot
- Directed by: Kazem Masoumi
- Written by: Masoud Sabbah, Dariush Mokhtari, and Kazem Masoumi
- Produced by: Kazem Masoumi
- Starring: Hossein Mahjoub, Hamid Farrokhnezhad, Babak Hamidiyan, Ali Ahmadi, and Hossein Norouzi
- Release date: 2004
- Running time: 84 minutes
- Country: Iran
- Language: Persian

Big Drum Under Left Foot (Persian: طبل بزرگ زیر پای چپ; also known as Left Foot Forward on the Beat) is a 2004 Iranian war drama directed by Kazem Masoumi. The story of movie is about the Iran–Iraq War. It was entered into the 27th Moscow International Film Festival.

== Plot ==
A group of Iranian troops are trapped in a trench on the front-lines. They are suffering from lack of water. Raising a white flag, one of the Iranian soldiers goes to the only spring in the region which is located between the two front lines. At that moment it is revealed that the Iraqi side has the same problem, and has also sent a man to fetch water from the spring. The Iranian group's commander is considering the situation when suddenly a mortar bomb hits just behind the Iranian front line. The commander, fearing an ambush, shoots and kills the Iraqi soldier. Subsequently, it is revealed that the Iraqi soldier was alone and that no ambush was intended. Ashamed of his actions in the light of this new information, the Iranian commander commits suicide.

== Reception ==
The film takes a critical view of the Iran–Iraq War, opposing the narrative of Iranian government's view. The film challenges the Iranian government's narrative which regards this conflict as holy war. The film was banned in Iran for some times.

== Title ==
The title of the film refers to a command used in the Iranian army to regulate the marching of soldiers during parade.
