= Autumn (1974 film) =

- Russian poster
- Russian: Осень
- Directed by: Andrei Smirnov
- Written by: Andrei Smirnov
- Starring: Natalya Rudnaya; Leonid Kulagin; Natalya Gundareva; Aleksandr Fatyushin; Lyudmila Maksakova
- Cinematography: Alexander Knyazhinsky
- Edited by: L. Rayeva
- Music by: Alfred Schnittke
- Production company: Mosfilm
- Release date: 1974
- Running time: 93mn
- Country: Soviet Union
- Language: Russian

Autumn (Russian: Осень, romanized: Osen) is a 1974 Soviet romance film directed by Andrei Smirnov.

== Plot ==
In mid-October, Ilya and Sasha, who pretend to be husband and wife, arrive from Leningrad to spend a week in a remote northern village. Ilya, a doctor, is unhappily married and childless, his marriage teetering on collapse. Sasha, three years younger, is nearly thirty and recently divorced after her husband’s refusal to have children led her to an abortion. Childhood friends who once considered marriage, they reconnect years later, realizing their feelings for each other have quietly endured. They spend the week fishing, talking, and sharing stories with their hosts, Edik and Dusya, who reveal their own marital struggles.

Ilya faces a deep inner conflict, knowing he should tell his wife he’s leaving her but unable to bring himself to do so. One day, he even calls her from a nearby village but says nothing. Sasha, sensing his hesitation, asks him not to leave her, yet doubts he will stay. When the week ends, they return to the city as the season’s first snow falls. Sasha, unable to bear her solitude, visits her friend Margot, whose marriage, though unconventional, is a source of comfort. Restless, she returns to her room late at night to find Ilya waiting for her, a silent sign that he may have finally chosen to be with her.

== Cast ==
- Natalya Rudnaya as Sacha
- Leonid Kulagin as Ilya
- Natalya Gundareva as Dusya
- Aleksandr Fatyushin as Eduard
- Lyudmila Maksakova as Margot
- Armen Dzhigarkhanyan as Viktor Skobkin
- Igor Kashintsev as a visitor to a pub
- Yuriy Kuzmenkov as police sergeant major
- Vladimir Lysenkov as a visitor to a pub
- Zoya Mokeyeva as Tanya, daughter of Dusya and Eduard
