= Yuri Klimenko =

Russian camera operator

- Born: Yuri Viktorovich Klimenko; 24 March 1944 (age 82); Dnipropetrovsk, Ukrainian SSR
- Occupation: cinematographer
- Years active: 1973–present

Yuri Viktorovich Klimenko (Russian: Ю́рий Ви́кторович Климе́нко; born 24 March 1944, Dnipropetrovsk, Ukrainian SSR) is a Soviet and Ukrainian cinematographer and photographer, laureate of State Prize (2000), a sixfold winner of the Nika Award (1999, 2001, 2006, 2011, 2015, 2019).

He worked with such directors as Stanislav Govorukhin, Georgiy Daneliya, Sergei Solovyov, Alexei Uchitel, Aleksei German Sr., Sergei Paradjanov.

== Selected filmography ==
- About Vitya, Masha and the Marines (1973, Mikhail Ptashuk)
- Contraband (1974, Stanislav Govorukhin)
- The Man is after Birds (1975, Ali Hamroyev)
- The Bodyguard (1979, Ali Hamroyev)
- Tears Were Falling (1982, Georgiy Daneliya)
- A Simple Death (1985, Alexander Kaidanovsky)
- The Legend of Suram Fortress (1985, Sergei Paradjanov)
- Wild Pigeon (1986, Sergei Solovyov)
- Black Rose Is an Emblem of Sorrow, Red Rose Is an Emblem of Love (1990, Sergei Solovyov)
- Anna Karamazoff (1991, Rustam Khamdamov)
- Three Sisters (1994, Sergei Solovyov)
- His Wife's Diary (2000, Alexei Uchitel)
- The Stroll (2003, Alexei Uchitel)
- Dreaming of Space (2005, Alexei Uchitel)
- Captive (2008, Alexei Uchitel)
- The Edge (2010, Alexei Uchitel)
- Break Loose (2013, Alexei Uchitel)
- Mom Blog Grader (2014, Andrey Silkin)
- Matilda (2017, Alexei Uchitel)
