= The North Wind (film) =

- Directed by: Renata Litvinova
- Written by: Renata Litvinova
- Produced by: Renata Litvinova; Natalya Dubovitskaya; Nadezhda Solovyova
- Starring: Renata Litvinova; Anton Shagin; Sofya Ernst; Galina Tyunina; Tatyana Piletskaya; Svetlana Khodchenkova; Nikita Kukushkin; Ulyana Dobrovskaya
- Cinematography: Oleg Lukichyov
- Edited by: Sergey Ivanov; Renata Litvinova
- Music by: Zemfira
- Production companies: Fond Zapredelye; Columbia Pictures
- Distributed by: Sony Pictures Releasing
- Release date: February 6, 2021 (Russia)
- Running time: 122 minutes
- Country: Russia
- Language: Russian
- Box office: ₽77.4 million; $1,182,871

The North Wind (Russian: Северный ветер) is a 2021 Russian fantasy drama film directed by Renata Litvinova. It was theatrically released in Russia on February 6, 2021 by Sony Pictures Productions and Releasing (SPPR).

== Plot ==
The film takes place on the territory of the Northern Fields during the reign of women of an influential clan. It seemed that they had everything, but suddenly chaos began.

== Cast ==
- Renata Litvinova as Margarita
- Anton Shagin as Benedict
- Sofya Ernst as Faina
- Galina Tyunina as Lotta
- Tatyana Piletskaya as Alisa
- Svetlana Khodchenkova as Matilda
- Nikita Kukushkin as Professor Flagellum
- Ulyana Dobrovskaya as Fanny
- Maksim Sukhanov as Cousin Boris
- Kirill Trubetskoy as Margarita's secretary
- Mikhail Gavasheli as Hugo
- Hibla Gerzmava as a singer on call (Opera Diva)

== Production ==
Initially, The North Wind was a performance by Renata Litvinova, a directorial debut at the Moscow Art Theater. A.P. Chekhov. Renata gave her play the "real phantasmagoria" genre, which premiered on May 22, 2017. The plot of the performance was somewhat different from the film. On the stage of the Moscow Art Theater, a large Soviet family, whose diamonds are buried somewhere in the garden, celebrates thirteen new years at once, which are replaced one after another.

In December 2018, Renata Litvinova gave a large-scale interview to Vogue Russia magazine and starred in a video for their YouTube channel. In it, she talked about filming the film and her own feelings from her work:

In general, for me this film is my personal blockbuster. Giant set, many actors with outstanding roles in perspective. I have never filmed a family saga - fantasy, costumed, fabulous, like from my dream. And in the theater it was chamber - like a rehearsal before a big movie. We didn't even have a production designer, that's how we all treated the project as an experiment. Full decorations - just a table, chairs, a tree and a window. Zemfira replaced the scenery with her music. Roma Litvinov (ru) also wrote ambiences - this is the most important part of the performance - the atmosphere of the northern house!
