= Irina Pegova =

Russian actress and television presenter (born 1978)

- Ирина Пегова
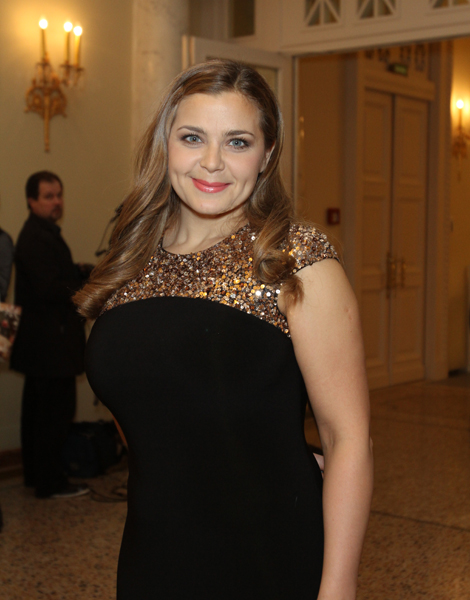
- Pegova in 2012
- Born: Irina Sergeevna Pegova; June 18, 1978 (age 48); Vyksa, Gorky Oblast, RSFSR, USSR
- Citizenship: Soviet Union (until 1991); Russia
- Occupations: Actress; television presenter
- Years active: 2001–present
- Awards: Golden Mask Award (2005, 2008); Golden Eagle Award (2004)

Irina Sergeevna Pegova (Russian: Ирина Сергеевна Пегова; born June 18, 1978) is a Russian actress of theatre, film, television, and voice acting, as well as a television presenter. She was awarded the honorary title People’s Artist of the Russian Federation in 2024.

Pegova is a two-time recipient of the Golden Mask Theatre Award (2005, 2008) and won the Golden Eagle Award for Best Actress in 2004 for her role in The Stroll (2003).

== Early life and education ==
Pegova was born in the town of Vyksa, Gorky Oblast in what is now Nizhny Novgorod Oblast. In 1995, she enrolled in the acting department of the Gorky Theatre School (now Nizhny Novgorod Theatre School). During her studies she was noticed by director Pyotr Fomenko.

In 1997, she moved to Moscow and entered the Russian Institute of Theatre Arts (GITIS), studying on Fomenko’s acting and directing course. She graduated in 2001.

== Career ==
After graduating from GITIS, Pegova joined the troupe of the Moscow theatre Workshop of Pyotr Fomenko, where she appeared in numerous acclaimed productions.

Her film debut in a leading role came in 2003 with Aleksei Uchitel’s film The Stroll, which brought her wide recognition and the Golden Eagle Award.

From 2004, Pegova collaborated with the Oleg Tabakov Theatre, and since 2006 she has been an actress of the Moscow Art Theatre named after A. P. Chekhov. Her stage work earned her major national theatre awards, including two Golden Masks and the Crystal Turandot Prize.

In addition to acting, she has participated in popular television projects. In 2015 she won the Russian version of Dancing with the Stars. In 2021 she hosted the dance competition show Dance Revolution on Channel One Russia.

== Personal life ==
Pegova was married to actor and film director Dmitry Orlov from 2005 until their divorce in 2011. They have a daughter, Tatyana (born 2006).

== Filmography ==
- Spartacus and Kalashnikov (2002)
- The Stroll (2003)
- Dreaming of Space (2005)
- The Return of the Musketeers, or The Treasures of Cardinal Mazarin (2009)
- Five Brides (2011)
- Fairytale.Is (2012)
- Love with an Accent (2012)
- Break Loose (2013)
- The Good Boy (2016)
- Flight Crew (2016)
- Doctor Richter (TV series, 2017-2019)
- Godunov (TV series, 2018-2019)
- House Arrest (TV series, 2018-2020)
- The Relatives (2021)
- Swingers (2022)
- Distant Loved Ones (2022)
- Yolki 11 (2024)
- The Crazy Empress (2025)
