= The Idiot (TV series) =

2003 Russian historical TV series

- Genre: Drama
- Based on: The Idiot by Fyodor Dostoevsky
- Written by: Vladimir Bortko
- Directed by: Vladimir Bortko
- Starring: Evgeny Mironov; Lidiya Velezheva; Vladimir Mashkov
- Composer: Igor Kornelyuk
- Country of origin: Russia
- Original language: Russian
- No. of series: 1
- No. of episodes: 10

Production
- Producer: Valery Todorovsky
- Cinematography: Dmitri Mass
- Production company: Studio 2B2 Entertainment

Original release
- Network: Telekanal Rossiya; ABC (United States)

The Idiot (Russian: Идиот) is a historical television series of Vladimir Bortko produced by Telekanal Rossiya in 2003 and in United States on ABC in 2004, based on Fyodor Dostoevsky's 1869 novel of the same title.

== Cast ==
- Evgeny Mironov — Prince Myshkin
- Lidiya Velezheva — Nastasya Filippovna
- Vladimir Mashkov — Parfyon Rogozhin
- Aleksandr Lazarev Jr. — Gavrilya Ardalionovich Ivolgin
- Oleg Basilashvili — General Ivan Yepanchin
- Inna Churikova — Elizaveta Prokofieevna Yepanchina, General Yepanchin's wife
- Olga Budina — Aglaya Ivanovna Yepanchina, their youngest daughter
- Aleksandr Domogarov — Evgeny Pavlovich (Aglaya's suitor)
- Aleksei Petrenko — general Ardalion Ivolgin, Ganya's father
- Vladimir Ilyin — Lebedev

== Awards ==
Idiot won several prizes at Golden Eagle 2003. Evgeny Mironov was honoured with Best Actor award, for his performance in the series he also won TEFI and was selected Actor of the Year at Monte-Carlo TC festival.

== Sources ==
- Yoon, Saera; Efird, Robert (2019). "Kurosawa, Bortko and the Conclusion of Dostoevsky's Idiot". CLCWeb: Comparative Literature and Culture. 21 (4).
- MacFadyen, David (2008). Russian Television Today: Primetime Drama and Comedy. Routledge. ISBN 978-1-134-09614-5.
- Ljutskanov, Yordan; Manolakev, Hristo; Rusev, Radostin (2014). Russian Classical Literature Today: The Challenges/Trials of Messianism and Mass Culture. Cambridge Scholars. ISBN 978-1-4438-5904-2.
