= The Children of Rosenthal =

Opera by Leonid Desyatnikov

- Opera by Leonid Desyatnikov
- Native title: Дети Розенталя
- Librettist: Vladimir Sorokin
- Language: Russian
- Premiere: 23 March 2005; Bolshoi Theatre, Moscow

The Children of Rosenthal (Russian: Дети Розенталя, romanized: D'eti Rozental'a) is a 2005 postmodern opera in two acts by Leonid Desyatnikov to a Russian libretto by Vladimir Sorokin.

Set in USSR during the post-World War II era, the opera tells the story of clones of great composers: Wagner, Tchaikovsky, Mussorgsky, Verdi, and Mozart. They were cloned by Alex Rosenthal, a scientist who escaped from Nazi Germany to the USSR. The premiere took place at the Bolshoi Theatre in Moscow on 23 March 2005.

== Background ==
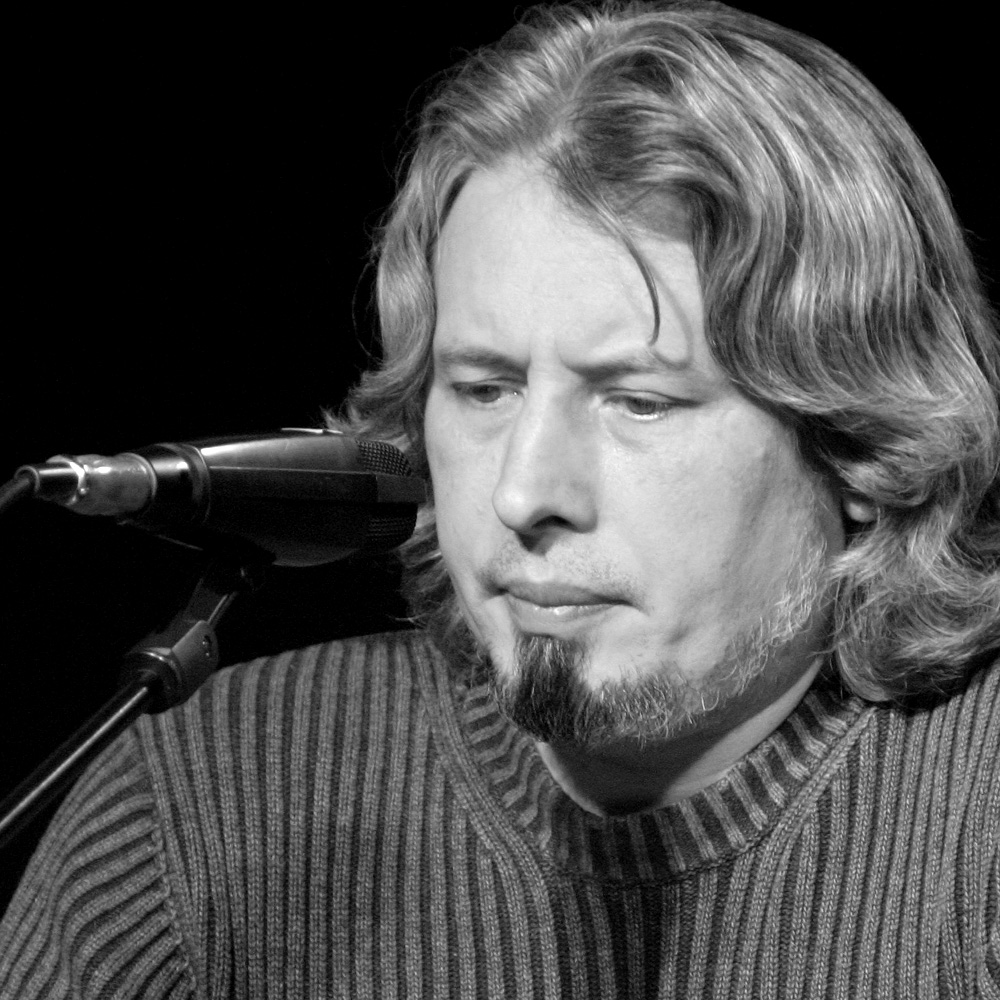
Vladimir Sorokin, the opera's librettist

The Children of Rosenthal, which premiered in 2005, was the Bolshoi Theatre's first world premiere of an opera since 1979. Eduard Boyakov and Peter Pospelov initiated the project and lobbied the Bolshoi Theatre's administration. In 2002 a contract was signed, with Leonid Desyatnikov scheduled to compose the opera, and Vladimir Sorokin to write the libretto. At first, they planned to create libretto based on Sorokin's play Shchi, but since the play uses obscene vocabulary, they decided to create an original libretto instead. When Desyatnikov met with Sorokin, the latter proposed, "Let's write an opera about clones of classic composers".

Desyatnikov and Sorokin selected two Russians and three non-Russians as composers most representative of the opera genre: Wagner, Verdi, Mozart, Mussorgsky, and Tchaikovsky. During preparation Sorokin read Russian translations of librettos of Der Ring des Nibelungen and some of Verdi's operas, and original librettos of Khovanshchina and Boris Godunov. Desyatnikov composed music based on works of 19th-century composers; in an interview he admitted that he also considered modern pop music as potential source material.

== Synopsis ==
=== Act 1 ===
Scene 1

In the beginning of the first act a silent film is shown, which explains the story of Alex Rosenthal, a talented scientist who escaped from Nazi Germany to the USSR in the 1930s. He invented the method of cloning animals and people.

The first subscene of scene 1 happens in Rosenthal's laboratory. He and the Geneticists (chorus) prepare to clone Mozart. They sing the aria that glorifies the "resurrection" of geniuses: "I believe: genius and death do not combine!" (Верю: несовместны гений и смерть!). The Voice from a loudspeaker explains the stages of cloning a human being by Rosenthal's method. Then Rosenthal, his Companions, and the Geneticists sing an aria proclaiming that the cloning of Mozart is successful.

The second subscene occurs at night. The clones of Wagner, Verdi, Mussorgsky, and Tchaikovsky sleep in hammocks near the scientific center. Rosenthal appears with a cradle. Wagner wakes up and describes a nightmare: the beautiful swan transformed into a rain of worms. Other clones wake up, and Rosenthal notifies them that the Mozart cloning was successful.

Scene 2

On the veranda of Rosenthal's dacha, Nanny and Tchaikovsky sing a duet. They are disappointed that she is too old to breast-feed Mozart, as she did for other clones. Tchaikovsky is worried: "How complex is this world! / How scary it is / And how strange it is!" (Как сложен мир! / Как страшно в нем / И странно!) Rosenthal brings in the newborn baby: Mozart. The other clones and Nanny remember the first time each of them appeared in the family. When they mention the toys that Stalin presented to them in the Kremlin, the Toys appear on the stage and dance. Rosenthal confesses that he lied to Stalin and told him that the clones are his own children. He was supposed to clone workers, not geniuses, so he cloned them illegally. A line of USSR's leaders' portraits appears, supported by their speeches showing the gradual reduction of the government's interest in the cloning project. The last one is Yeltsin, who says the government has no money for the project. The funeral portrait of Rosenthal then appears, with the dates 1910–1992. The Voice says that there are no means to support the clones.

=== Act 2 ===
Scene 3

This scene takes place on the Three Stations Square in Moscow in 1993. The Departing Passengers, Taxi Drivers, the Refugee, Gamblers, the Hobo, Prostitutes, and Traders each sing songs. The clones perform their show. Tanya the prostitute is deeply touched by the show. All clones except Mozart leave for the pub.

Scene 4

Mozart and Tanya sing about their love. Kela the pimp interrupts them. Verdi pays Kela for Tanya, giving him his father's golden clock. Mozart and Tanya call everyone to their wedding: "Love overcomes everything!" (Всё побеждает любовь!). Kela the pimp is disappointed that he lost one of his prostitutes: "The wedding will not be long!" (Недолго свадебка продлится! / Пеняй, оторва, на себя!)

In the second subscene all of the railway station's inhabitants run back to the stage. The wedding takes place, and everyone is happy. Tanya calls the clones to move to her mother's place in Crimea, so they all would happily live there. Their train arrives. Mussorgsky proposes drinking vodka (a tradition before a long trip). The clones and Tanya soon feel ill and fall on the ground.

Scene 5

Mozart is alone in Sklifosofsky's hospital. The Voice explains to him that the vodka was poisoned by Kela the pimp; everyone else died, but Mozart's immunity saved him, as the original Mozart was poisoned by mercury. Mozart's singing is supported by snippets from arias by the clones and Tanya, until those fade away; Mozart is left alone.

== Style and structure ==
The opera's music style is postmodern: each composer's clone has a scene in the opera which is a "mini opera" of that composer. The musical references are not limited to the specific composer's original music; for example, there are musical references to Shostakovich.

The libretto is the conceptual base that supports musical structure, by dividing the opera into scenes which imitate the appropriate composer's style. In the first scene, Wagner sees a nightmare that echoes the Divine Swan image. The second scene's duet between Nanny and Tchaikovsky is a parody of Eugene Onegin. The third scene's background characters and choral singing relate to Mussorgsky's Boris Godunov. The fourth scene links to Verdi's works by the love duet of Mozart and Tanya and by phrases in Italian.

== Recordings ==
"Melodiya" record label has recorded concert version of the opera in December 2015; the recording has been published as CD and to iTunes in the beginning of opera season 2016–2017.

== Controversy ==
The opera was met with protests on its debut. Some members of the Russian parliament described the state-funded Bolshoi's first new opera in more than 30 years as pornographic, vulgar and unsuitable for such a venerable institution. State Duma deputies from the United Russia party instructed parliament's culture committee to launch an inquiry into the opera.
