= Matilda (2017 film) =

- Theatrical release poster
- Directed by: Alexei Uchitel
- Screenplay by: Alexandr Terehov
- Produced by: Alexei Uchitel; Alexandr Dostmann; Vladimir Vinokur
- Starring: Michalina Olszańska; Lars Eidinger; Danila Kozlovsky; Grigoriy Dobrygin; Ingeborga Dapkūnaitė; Yevgeny Mironov; Galina Tyunina; Vitali Kishchenko; Thomas Ostermeier; Sergei Garmash
- Cinematography: Yuriy Klimenko
- Music by: Marco Beltrami
- Production company: TPO Rok
- Release date: October 26, 2017
- Running time: 130 minutes
- Country: Russia
- Language: Russian
- Budget: $25 million

Matilda (Russian: Матильда) is а 2017 Russian historical romantic drama film directed by Alexei Uchitel. It was released in cinemas on October 26, 2017. The picture tells the story about the relationship between ballerina Matilda Kshesinskaya and Nicholas II.

Criticised by monarchist groups as a "distortion of historical events", the picture became controversial after State Duma deputy Natalia Poklonskaya led a campaign to ban the film on religious grounds.

The premiere of the film took place on October 23, 2017 at the Mariinsky Theatre in St. Petersburg.

== Plot ==
The film tells the story of the romantic relationship between the heir to the Russian throne, Nikolai Aleksandrovich Romanov, and the ballerina of the Imperial Theater, Matilda Kshesinskaya, beginning when the 22-year-old tsesarevich and 17-year-old dancer first meet in 1890 and continuing through the coronation of Nikolai and his wife, Aleksandra Feodorovna, in 1896. Their intense, passionate romance is fraught with tension, as they navigate societal pressures and interference from Empress Maria Feodorovna, Nicholas’s mother, who urges him to forget Matilda and fulfill his royal duties.

The film weaves between key moments in their relationship, from their initial connection to increasingly scandalous encounters that capture the attention of the Imperial family and Russian society. Matilda's beauty and talent win the heir’s admiration, but the romance strains as Nicholas is pressured to marry the German princess Alix. Their story culminates at Nicholas’s coronation, where Matilda, devastated by his marriage, demands the lead role in the ballet "Pearl" at the Bolshoi Theatre, transforming her performance into both an artistic triumph and a symbolic struggle with her unrequited love.

== Cast ==
- Michalina Olszańska as Mathilde Kschessinska
- Lars Eidinger as Nicholas II of Russia
- Danila Kozlovsky as Vorontzov
- Grigoriy Dobrygin as Grand Duke Andrey Vladimirovich
- Ingeborga Dapkūnaitė as Maria Fedorovna
- Yevgeny Mironov as Ivan Karlovich, director of the Imperial Theatres
- Thomas Ostermeier as Doctor Fisher
- Sergei Garmash as Emperor Alexander III
- Luise Wolfram as Alexandra Fedorovna
- Vitali Kishchenko as Grand Duke Vladimir Alexandrovich
- Galina Tyunina as Mariya Pavlovna, Vladimir's wife
- Vitaliy Kishchenko as Vlasov
- Sarah Stern as Pierina Legnani
- Yan Ge as Kawakami, Legnani's Chinese masseuse
- Alexandra Serebryakova as Ballerina
- Tamara Tax as Ballerina
- Sergey Malyugov as Grand duke
- Stepan Pivkin as Grand duke
- Kirill Gorbunov as Prince George of Greece and Denmark
- Ekaterina Dar as Princess at the coronation
- Oleg Pospolitak as Priest
- Anna Chernovich as Maid of honor of the Empress Maria Fedorovna
- Mariya Glazunova as Maid of honor
- Anastasiya Lomachenkova
- Stanislav Lyamtsev
- Alina Suhareva as Maid
- Sergey Korenkov as Colonel
- Kirill Andreev as Guard on the train
- Sergey Krasavin as General
- Roman Shalyapin as Assistant director of the Imperial Theatres

== Reception ==
The film received mixed reviews in Russian media. Yuri Grymov and Stas Tyrkin from Komsomolskaya Pravda differed in their opinions; Grymow criticized the film, citing the muddled nature of the picture, while Tyrkin gave a positive review.

Egor Belikov from Time Out and Andrey Piskov from The Hollywood Reporter described the film as an overblown melodrama.

Meduza's Anton Dolin praised the film; he complimented the fairy-tale like atmosphere, cinematography, sets and costumes.

== Controversy ==
In 2016 when the official trailer of the film which contained in particular erotic love scenes was released, representatives of the public movement "King's Cross" found in the upcoming film a "distortion of historical events", and an "anti-Russian and anti-religious provocation in the field of culture". One cinema chain pulled out of showing the film after a group of self-described Orthodox militants threatened the film’s director and cinemas preparing to screen it.

After a request to the Prosecutor General of the Russian Federation from the Duma deputy Natalia Poklonskaya known for her veneration of Nicholas II, the film's material was audited and no violations were found. The Chairman of the Duma Committee on Culture, film director Stanislav Govoruhin, criticized the idea of checking the film, he expressed confidence that such scandalous initiatives should be "nipped right in the bud." In the Kremlin, Poklonskaya’s request caused confusion and an uncertain delayed response. The Ministry of Culture said that the question of issuing certificates for rental of the film will be decided upon the completion of work on the picture.

Somewhat later in December 2016 it was reported that the prosecutor's office would request the movie's script for inspection at the request of deputy Poklonskaya.

In September 2017, Cinema Park and Formula Kino group, Russia's biggest cinema chain, cancelled screenings of the film due to "extreme actions by opponents of the film" and threats made against cinemas. They later reversed the decision. Two cars were torched outside the Moscow office of a lawyer acting for Alexei Uchitel, the director of the film.

On 4 September, an ultra-Orthodox participant in a monarchist rally against the film rammed the entrance to the Cosmos cinema, the largest in Yekaterinburg, with his car. In the car there was a barrel of gasoline and gas cylinders. The criminal set fire to the car with a Molotov cocktail and tried to escape but was soon detained. The court released him from criminal liability because it deemed him insane. For the same reason, the owners of the cinema did not receive compensation for the damage caused (19.3 million rubles in their estimation).

=== Attempts of a ban ===
Director of the office of the Russian Imperial House Aleksandr Zakatov called the film "blasphemy" but added that "such works should be condemned, but to inflate a scandal around them and make a formal ban does not make sense". A similar position was taken by the Bishop of Yegoryevsk Tikhon (Shevkunov), who reviewed the film highly critically but said that the demand to ban the film "is an absolutely dead-end and wrong approach":

... An admonition regarding right and wrong – this is the goal that can and must be put in connection with the forthcoming wide screening of the film.

Nevertheless, Bishop Tikhon pointed out, "most likely, individuals and groups, including Orthodox, will demand its prohibition".

== Production ==
More than 17 tons of fabric were used to create a total of more than 5,000 costumes.
