= Sergey Smirnov (writer) =

Soviet writer, historian, radio and TV presenter

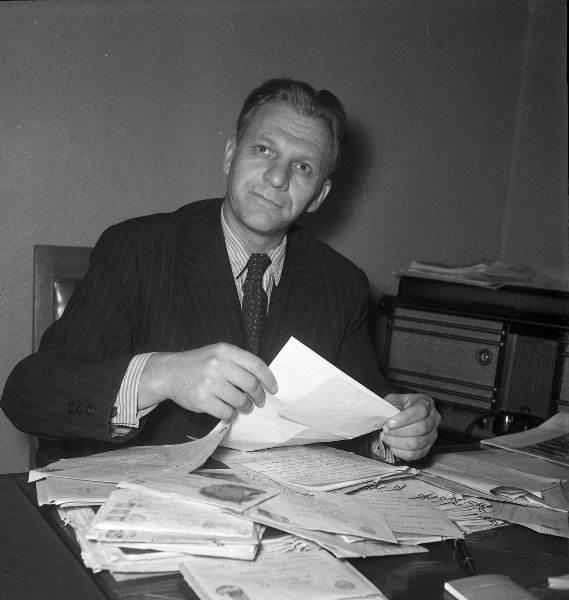
- Smirnov, 1956
- Born: September 26, 1915; Petrograd, Russian Empire
- Died: March 22, 1976 (aged 60); Moscow, RSFSR, Soviet Union
- Occupations: Writer, television presenter, radio host

Sergey Sergeyevich Smirnov (Russian: Серге́й Серге́евич Смирно́в; 1915–1976) was a Soviet writer, a historian, a radio- and TV-presenter, a public figure, a Lenin Prize winner (1965). He was a member of the RCP(b) since 1946.

Smirnov was born into an engineer's family. He quit Moscow Power Engineering Institute without getting a degree and entered the Maxim Gorky Literature Institute. In 1941 he went to the front. After the war he worked as an editor in Voenizdat.

Sergey was the deputy editor-in-chief of Novy Mir (November 1953 – October 1954), the editor-in-chief of Literaturnaya Gazeta in 1959—1960. The Secretary of the Union of Soviet Writers (1975—1976).

Smirnov was famous for his books about heroes of the Great Patriotic War. He did a lot to immortalize heroic deeds of unknown soldiers and to find soldiers missing in action.
