= Leonid Desyatnikov =

European composer (born 1955 in Ukraine)

- Леонид Десятников
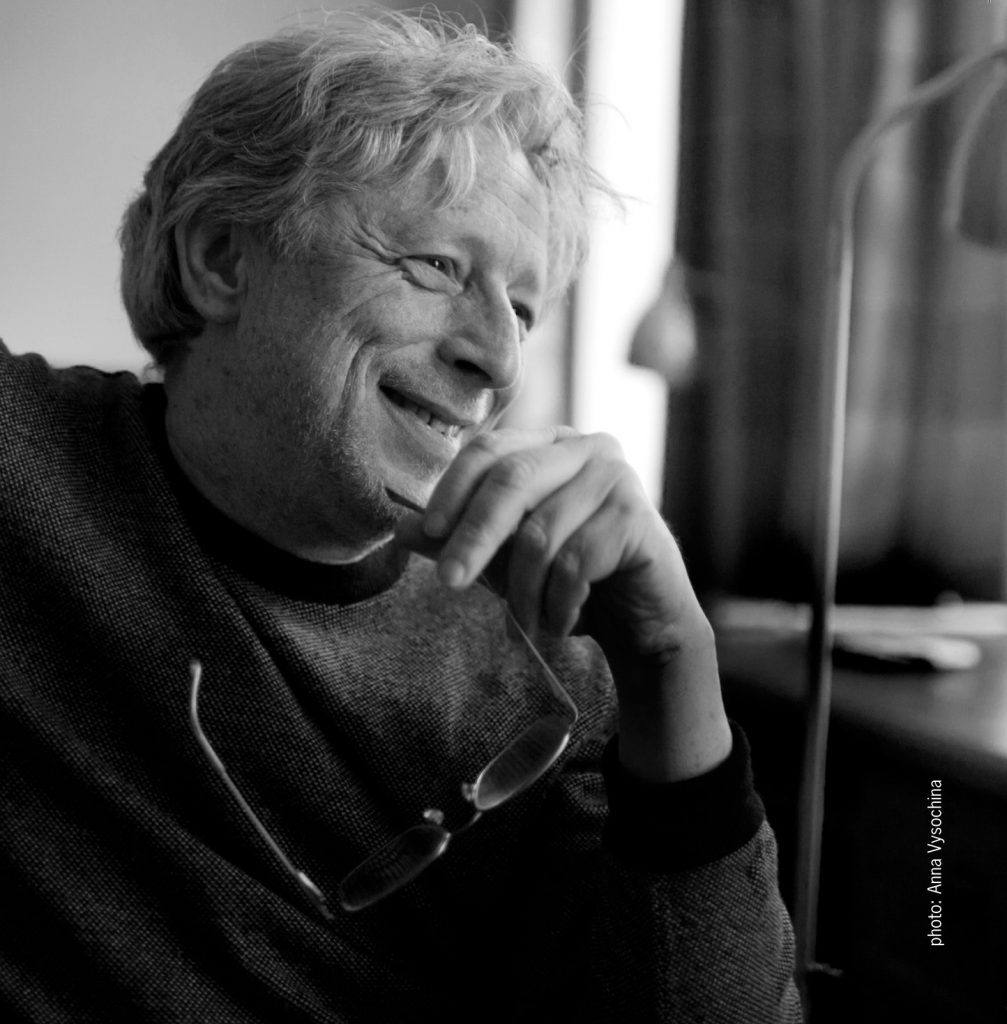
- Born: October 16, 1955 (age 71); Kharkiv, Ukrainian SSR
- Education: Leningrad Conservatory
- Occupation: Composer

Leonid Arkadievich Desyatnikov (Russian: Леонид Аркадьевич Десятников, born 16 October 1955) is a composer. He is a member of the St. Petersburg Union of Composers. Desyatnikov is the author of multiple operas, cantatas and compositions. His best known works are The Children of Rosenthal, his score for the ballet Lost Illusions, the opera Poor Liza; Gift, a cantata on poems by Gavriil Derzhavin; Dichterliebe und -leben, a vocal cycle on poems by Daniil Kharms and Nikolay Oleynikov; The Leaden Echo for voice(s) and instruments on the poem by Gerard Manley Hopkins; The Rite of Winter 1949, a symphony for choir, soloists and orchestra; and Songs of Bukovina for piano.

== Life and career ==
Leonid Desyatnikov was born on October 16, 1955 in Kharkiv, Ukraine. He studied composition and instrumentation at the Leningrad Conservatory in St. Petersburg.

He has written four operas, several cantatas and numerous vocal and instrumental compositions. His principal compositions include: The Children of Rosenthal (an opera in two acts; libretto, Vladimir Sorokin), commissioned by the Bolshoi Theatre; Poor Liza (a chamber opera in one act; with libretto by the composer, after the novel by Nikolai Karamzin); Gift (a cantata based on the verses of Gavrila Derzhavin); The Leaden Echo (a work for voice(s) and instruments based on the poem by Gerard Manley Hopkins); and The Rite of Winter 1949 (a symphony for chorus, soloists and orchestra).

Desyatnikov has been collaborating with Gidon Kremer since 1996 as a composer (Wie der Alte Leiermann...; the chamber version of Sketches to Sunset; Russian Seasons) as well as arranging the works of Astor Piazzolla, including the tango-operita María de Buenos Aires and the tango suite Cuatro estaciones porteñas. Desyatnikov wrote the scores for the films Sunset (1990), Lost in Siberia (1991), Hammer and Sickle (1994), Moscow Nights (Katya Izmailova) (1994), Giselle’s Mania (1995), Prisoner of the Mountains (1996), All That Is Tender (1996), Moscow (2000), His Wife’s Diary (2000) and The Target (2010), "Trompe-loeil" for piano four hands, Aldeburgh (2023, June), "Reflections on the Folk Song" for 19 strings and viola obbligata, Stockholm (2024, August), "Saint Petersburg, Florida", barcarola for two pianos, Padova (2024, September).

Leonid Desyatnikov left St. Petersburg in March 2022 after the Russian full-scale invasion of Ukraine. At the present time, he lives in Haifa, Israel.

== Awards ==
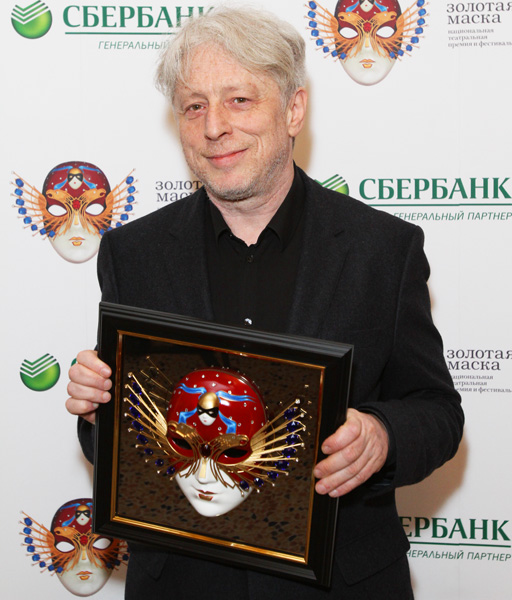
Leonid Desyatnikov in 2012

Desyatnikov was awarded a Golden Ram prize and the Grand Prix of the IV International Cinema Music festival in Bonn for his score for Moscow and the special prize of the Window to Europe Cinema Festival in Vyborg. In 2006 the opera The Children of Rosenthal received the special jury prize of The Golden Mask National Theatre Award. In 2003 Desyatnikov was awarded the State Prize of Russia.

== Works ==
Desyatnikov is the author of four operas, the symphony The Rite of Winter 1949, vocal cycles to the poems of Rilke and the OBERIU poets, and several instrumental transcriptions of themes by Ástor Piazzolla. The style of his music is defined by the composer himself as "an emancipation of consonance, transformation of banality and 'minimalism' with a human face". His favourite genre is "a tragically naughty bagatelle".

=== Opera ===
- Poor Liza (Бедная Лиза) one-act chamber opera, libretto by Leonid Desyatnikov after Nikolai Karamzin's novel (1976, revised 1980)
- Nobody Wants to Sing or Bravo-bravissimo, Pioneer Anisimov (Никто не хочет петь, или Браво-брависсимо, пионер Анисимов a comic opera for children in two acts, libretto by B. Chaban (1982)
- Vitamin of the Growth (Витамин роста) one-act classical opera for children, for the soloists and piano after the poem by Oleg Grigoriev (1985)
- The Children of Rosenthal (Дети Розенталя) opera in two acts, libretto by Vladimir Sorokin. Commissioned by the Bolshoi Theatre, premiered March 23, 2005

=== Chamber music ===
- Variations on the Obtaining of a Dwelling for violoncello and piano.
- Wie der alte Leiermann for violin and piano
- Du côté de chez Swan for two pianos
- Sketches to Sunset, quintet for flute, clarinet, violin, double bass and piano
- Return for oboe, clarinet, two violins, viola, cello and tape

=== Other genres ===
- Gift (Dar), after Gavrila Derzhavin
- Dichterliebe und -leben, a vocal cycle to the poems by Daniil Kharms and Nikolay Oleynikov
- The Leaden Echo, for voice(s) and instruments after Gerard Manley Hopkins
- Russian Seasons for voice, solo violin and strings

=== Music for symphony orchestra ===
- The Rite of Winter 1949, a symphony for chorus, soloists and orchestra.
- Sketches to Sunset for orchestra

=== Ballet ===
- Lost Illusions

=== Film music ===
- Sunset ("Закат", Zeldovich, 1990)
- Lost in Siberia ("Затерянный в Сибири", 1991, Mitta)
- Katia Izmailova (Moscow nights) ("Подмосковные вечера", Todorovsky, 1994)
- Hammer and Sickle ("Серп и молот", Livnev, 1994)
- Giselle's Mania ("Мания Жизели", Uchitel, 1995)
- The Prisoner of the Mountains ("Кавказский пленник", Bodrov, 1996)
- Whoever Softer ("Тот, кто нежнее", Karpykov, 1996)
- His Wife's Diary (Uchitel, 2000)
- Moscow ("Москва", Zeldovich, 2000)
- Tycoon ("Олигарх", Loungine, 2002)
- Dreaming of Space ("Космос как предчувствие", Uchitel, 2005)
- Captive ("Пленный", Uchitel, 2008)
- Target ("Мишень", Zeldovich, 2011)
- Van Goghs ("Ван Гоги", Livnev, 2019)
