= Galina Tyunina =

Russian Actress

- Галина Тюнина
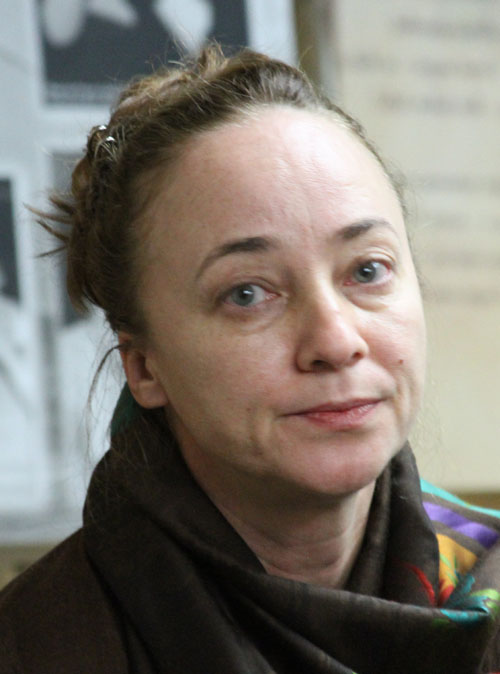
- Tyunina in 2014
- Born: Galina Borisovna Tyunina; 13 October 1967 (age 59); Bolshoy Kamen
- Education: Saratov Theatre School
- Occupation: Actress

Galina Borisovna Tyunina (Russian: Гали́на Бори́совна Тю́нина; born 1967) is a Russian actress, People's Artist of Russia. She appeared in over 30 films.

== Biography ==
Galina was born on October 13, 1967, in the Primorsky Krai, she studied at the Saratov Theater School (course of Valentina Ermakova) and at GITIS, after which she began acting in films.

== Selected filmography ==
Year	Title	Role	Notes
2000	His Wife's Diary	Vera Bunina	
2003	The Stroll	tour desk worker	
2004	Night Watch	Olga	
2006	Day Watch	Olga	
2017	Matilda	Mariya Pavlovna	
2017	The North Wind	Lotta	
2022	A Portrait of a Stranger	Peresvetova	
2023	Here's to You and Us!	Esther Davydovna	
