= Alexei Uchitel =

Russian film director (born 1951)

Alexey Uchitel
- Алексей Учитель
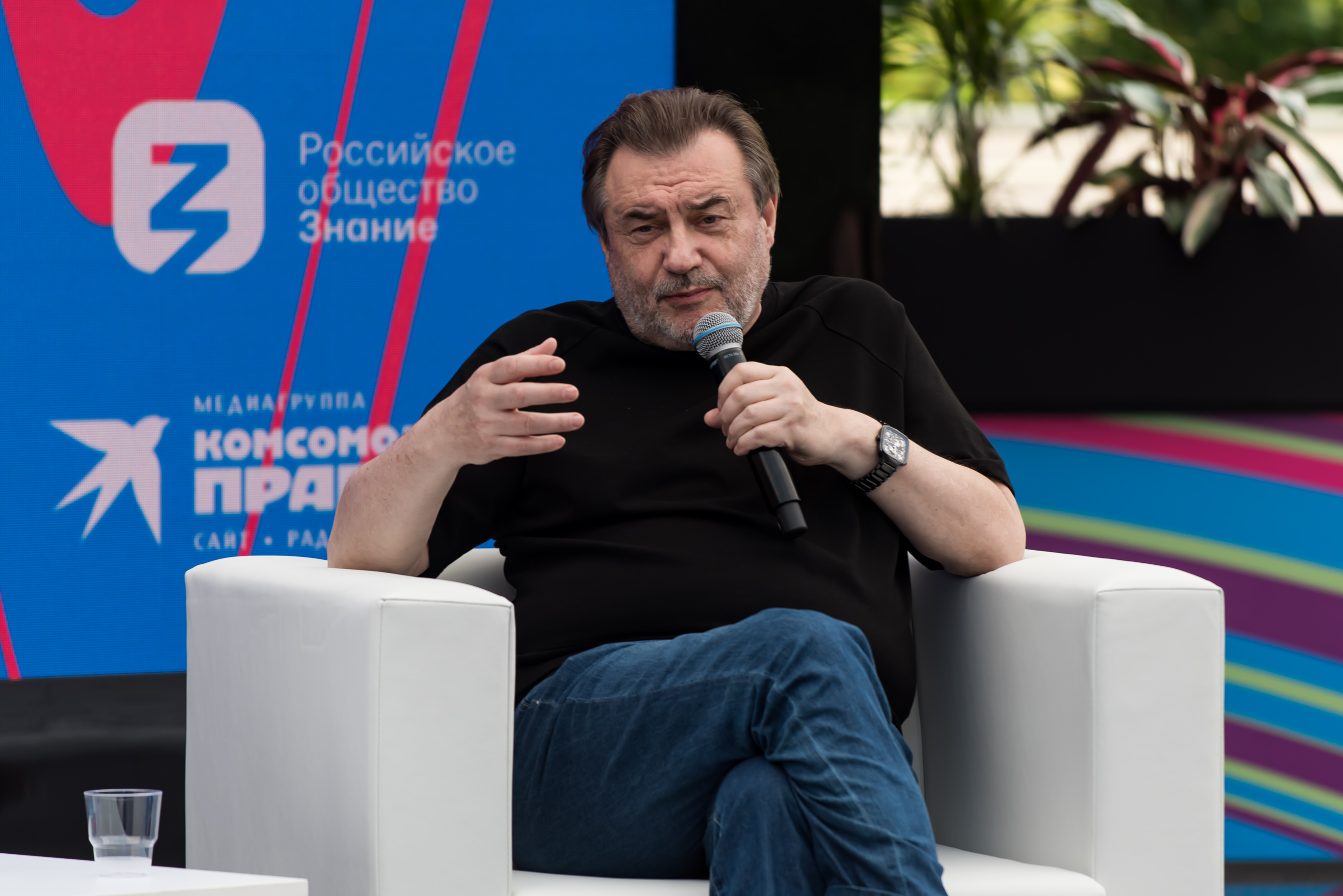
- Alexey Uchitel in 2022
- Born: Aleksei Yefimovich Uchitel; 31 August 1951 (age 74); Leningrad, Russian SFSR, Soviet Union (now Saint Petersburg, Russia)
- Occupation: Film director

Aleksei Yefimovich Uchitel (Russian: Алексей Ефимович Учитель; born 31 August 1951) is a Russian film director. In 2002, he received the title People's Artist of Russia.

== Life and career ==
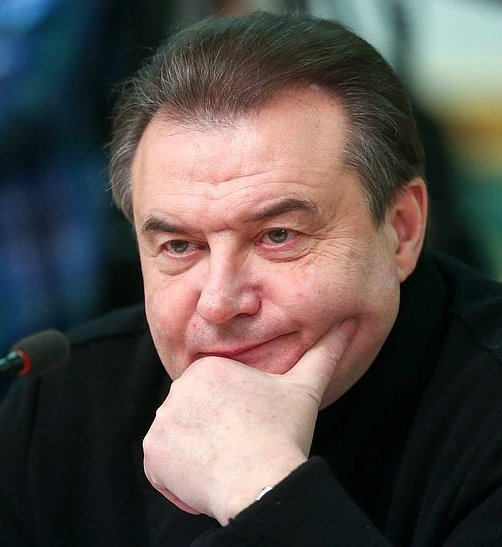
Uchitel in 2019

Uchitel was born on 31 August 1951 in Leningrad to the family of documentary filmmaker Yefim Uchitel.

In 1975, he graduated from VGIK, worked at the Leningrad studio of documentary films.

In 1990, he founded his film studio "Rock". Uchitel's directorial debut was the film Gisele's Mania.

In 2000, he received the Nika Award, the Kinotavr Grand Prix and the Crystal Globe nomination for His Wife's Diary. The film was about the last love affair of Ivan Bunin.

His 2003 film The Stroll was entered into the 25th Moscow International Film Festival. His 2005 film Dreaming of Space won the Golden George at the 27th Moscow International Film Festival. In 2006, he was a member of the jury at the 28th Moscow International Film Festival.

His 2010 film The Edge was selected as the Russian entry for the Best Foreign Language Film at the 83rd Academy Awards but it did not make the final shortlist.

His film Break Loose was selected to be screened in the Contemporary World Cinema section at the 2013 Toronto International Film Festival.

The romantic drama Matilda directed by Uchitel about the relationship between ballerina Matilda Kshesinskaya and Nicholas II was released on 23 October 2017. The picture became controversial after State Duma deputy Natalia Poklonskaya led a campaign to ban the film on religious grounds.

== Personal life ==
In 1981, Uchitel married Kira Saksaganskaya. They have a son. The couple separated without formally filing for divorce. For many years, Uchitel had an affair with the Russian actress Yulia Peresild, with whom he has two daughters, Anna (born 2009) and Maria (born 2012). In 2021, Peresild announced that she had broken up with him.

== Selected filmography ==
- Rock (1987)
- Last Hero. Victor Tsoi. (1992)
- Gisele's Mania (1996)
- His Wife's Diary (2000)
- The Stroll (2003)
- Dreaming of Space (2005)
- Captive (2008)
- The Edge (2010)
- Break Loose (2013)
- Matilda (2017)
- Tsoi (2020)
