= List of Russian films of 2001 =

A list of films produced in Russia in 2001 (see 2001 in film).

== 2001 ==
Title	Russian title	Director	Cast	Genre	Notes
101st Kilometer	101-й километр	Leonid Maryagin	Pyotr Fyodorov	Drama	
Come Look at Me	Приходи на меня посмотреть	Mikhail Agranovich, Oleg Yankovskiy	Oleg Yankovsky, Irina Kupchenko, Yekaterina Vasilyeva	Comedy	
Down House	Даун Хаус	Roman Kachanov	Fyodor Bondarchuk, Jerzy Stuhr, Barbara Brylska	Comedy	
Garbage Man	Мусорщик	Georgy Shengeliya	Aleksei Guskov, Olesya Sudzilovskaya	Romance	
Give Me Moonlight	Подари мне лунный свет	Dmitry Astrakhan	Natalya Andreychenko, Nikolai Yeremenko Jr.	Comedy	
The Heart of the Bear	Сердце медведицы	Arvo Iho	Rain Simmul, Dinara Drukarova, Ilyana Pavlova, Külli Teetamm	Drama	joint Estonian-Russian production
Holiday	Праздник	Garik Sukachov	Masha Oamer, Aleksandr Baluyev	Drama	
In August of 1944	В августе 44-го…	Mikhail Ptashuk	Yevgeny Mironov, Vladislav Galkin	action	Russian / Belarusian co-production
The Jewish Steppe		Valeri Ovchinnikov		Documentary	
Journey Back to Youth	Путешествие в юность	Alexander Gutman		Documentary	
Life Is Full of Fun	Жизнь забавами полна	Pyotr Todorovsky	Lyudmila Arinina, Vladimir Kashpur	Drama	
Mechanical Suite	Механическая сюита	Dmitry Meskhiev	Mikhail Porechenkov, Sergei Garmash, Konstantin Khabensky	Comedy, drama	
Northern Lights	Северное сияние	Andrey Razenkov	Marina Aleksandrova, Aleksandr Zbruyev	Drama	
Poisons or the World History of Poisoning	Яды, или Всемирная история отравлений	Karen Shakhnazarov	Ignat Akrachkov, Oleg Basilashvili, Zhanna Dudanova, Aleksandr Bashirov	Comedy	Was awarded the Grand Prix at the Kinotavr film festival.
Sisters	Сестры	Sergei Bodrov, Jr.	Oksana Akinshina	Crime	
Taurus	Телец	Alexander Sokurov	Leonid Mozgovoy, Mariya Kuznetsova, Sergei Razhuk	Biopic	Entered into the 2001 Cannes Film Festival
Yellow Dwarf	Жёлтый карлик	Dmitry Astrakhan	Aleksandr Abdulov, Elena Proklova	Comedy	

== See also ==
- 2001 in Russia
