= Union of Salvation (film) =

- Theatrical release poster
- Directed by: Andrei Kravchuk
- Written by: Nikita Vysotskiy (ru); Oleg Malovichko
- Story by: Oksana Kiyanskaya (ru)
- Based on: The Decembrist revolt
- Produced by: Konstantin Ernst; Anatoly Maksimov
- Starring: Leonid Bichevin; Maksim Matveyev; Pavel Priluchny; Ivan Yankovsky; Anton Shagin; Ivan Kolesnikov; Aleksandr Domogarov; Igor Petrenko; Sergey Peregudov; Vitali Kishchenko; Aleksei Guskov; Aleksandr Ustyugov; Sergey Koltakov; Vladislav Vetrov; Artyom Tkachenko
- Cinematography: Igor Grinyakin (ru)
- Music by: Dmitriy Emelyanov (ru)
- Production companies: 20th Century Fox CIS; Channel One; Cinema Directorate Studio; Ministry for Culture of Russia; Cinema Foundation
- Distributed by: 20th Century Fox CIS
- Release date: December 26, 2019 (Russia)
- Running time: 136 minutes
- Country: Russia
- Language: Russian
- Budget: ₽980 million; $16.1 million
- Box office: ₽729.1 million; $11.4 million

Union of Salvation (Russian: Союз спасения, romanized: Soyuz spaseniya) is a 2019 Russian war epic period adventure film directed by Andrei Kravchuk, written by Nikita Vysotskiy and Oleg Malovichko, and produced by Konstantin Ernst. The film was created in collaboration with the Cinema Direction Studios with Mosfilm Studios and Lenfilm with the support of the Russian state Cinema Foundation.

The story is about veterans of the French invasion of Russia of 1812, who conspired to install Konstantin Pavlovich as the new tsar of the Russian Empire, transform Russia into a constitutional monarchy and abolish serfdom. In Imperial Russia in 1816, several officers of the Russian Imperial Guard founded a society known as the Union of Salvation. They led a revolt in Saint Petersburg in December 1825, when about 3,000 officers and soldiers refused to swear allegiance to the new Tsar Nicholas I. This group of conspirators ended up leading the Decembrist revolt. The revolt incorporated elements of the Life-Guards Moscow Regiment, Grenadier Life Guards Regiment, and Naval Equipage of the Guard.

The film shows in detail both the Decembrist uprising on Senate Square in Saint Petersburg and the uprising of the 29th Chernigov Infantry Regiment of the Imperial Russian Army, stationed in the Kiev Governorate of the Russian Empire.

According to the website of the Union of Cinematographers of the Russian Federation, the picture's budget in 2016 was estimated at 700 million rubles. Production of the film got underway in 2017 when Cinema Direction Studios began gathering staff to produce the film. Principal photography began in January 2018, in Saint Petersburg and in Belgorod Oblast.

Union of Salvation was released in the Russian Federation by 20th Century Fox CIS (through Buena Vista International) on December 26, 2019, in 2D, Atmos.

== Plot ==
In 1808, Emperor Napoleon I visits a boarding house in Paris, where he is presented with a cadre of promising students. One of the students, Sergey Muravyov-Apostol, the son of a Russian diplomat, impresses him with his liberal views.

In March of 1814, the Imperial Russian Army has just captured Paris and is celebrating the defeat of Napoleonic France. During the review of the Life Guards of the Semyonovsky Regiment by Tsar Alexander I, the guard officers–among them Muravyov-Apostol - offer to drink champagne with him in honor of their victory but the sovereign refuses.

In 1820, Muravyov-Apostol is growing increasingly disillusioned with Tsarist autocracy and has associated himself with liberal personalities in Saint Petersburg including the poet Kondraty Ryleyev, energetic republican Mikhail Bestuzhev-Ryumin, distinguished veteran Pavel Pestel, and Prince Sergey Trubetskoy. While attending a theater play hosted by Governor-General Mikhail Miloradovich, Muravyov-Apostol and his fellow officers are forced to leave early due to a sudden riot by the Semyonovsky Regiment. Muravyov-Apostol and Bestuzhev-Ryumin pacify the furious soldiers who are aggrieved by frequent corporal punishment and excessive drill. Despite this, the Tsar's punishments are harsh - Trubetskoy is retained due to being uninvolved while the others are demoted, dismissed, and/or transferred to Little Russia.

In the Kiev Governorate, Muravyov-Apostol and Bestuzhev-Ryumin are embedded into the 29th Chernigov Infantry Regiment and later meet with Pestel and other fellow officers and veterans of the Napoleonic Wars. Pestel attempts to recruit Muravyov-Apostol into a plot to assassinate the Tsar during his review of the troops and then subsequently march on St. Petersburg. To cover up the diversion of regimental funds into the plot, Pestel forces Captain Arkady Mayboroda at gunpoint to sign a receipt stating that the latter borrowed the missing amount from the regimental treasury for private use. However, Mayboroda sends a letter to Alexander, alerting him of the conspiracy. The Tsar, himself striving for reform, keeps the conspiracy under wraps and cancels the review. The conspirators get off with an unspoken warning.

Alexander later confides in his younger brother Nicholas that he would be the new successor instead of his older brother Constantine who expressed no desire to rule. This arrangement is kept secret.

By 1825, the reformist officers - now including Prince Yevgeniy Obolensky, retired lieutenant Pyotr Kakhovsky, Captain Mikhail Bestuzhev, and Lieutenant Nikolai Panov - have established secret groups in St. Petersburg to push for radical change in Russia. Despite their shared goals, Ryleyev and Trubetskoy fall out with Pestel over how to carry out their plans. In Kiev, Muravyov-Apostol begins swaying the Chernigov Regiment to his cause including elevating a disgraced grenadier to the rank of major much to the consternation of his fellow officer Colonel Gustav Gebel.

Later that year, Alexander dies. His death triggers a crisis as Constantine is publicly acknowledged as the new Tsar. Miloradovich, fearing political unrest, pressures Nicholas to swear allegiance to Constantine despite the secret change in succession. Mayboroda's letter is discovered among Alexander's notes, fully exposing the conspiracy of the reformists and leading to mass arrests. Pestel, frustrated and ill, burns all his incriminatory documents and then allows himself to be arrested.

Ryleyev learns from his associate Count Nikolay Mordvinov about the imperial succession crisis. Ryleyev then informs Trubetskoy and the rest of the reformists. Impatient and restless, they decide to instigate a revolution by exploiting the dynastic confusion of the interregnum following Alexander's death.

On the morning of December 14, the day of Nicholas's accession to the throne, the Moscow Life Guards Regiment - led by Obolensky, Panov, Kakhovsky, and Bestuzhev - marches to Senate Square declaring their allegiance to Constantine and calling for a constitution. They prepare to attack the Senate which has sworn allegiance to Nicholas. Miloradovich attempts to persuade the soldiers to return to their barracks. He almost succeeds in swaying the troops only to be shot by Kakhovsky and then fatally bayonetted by Obolensky. Nicholas rushes to the square where he is jeered at by the crowd and fails to prevent more troops from defecting. Realizing the stubbornness of the rebels, Nicholas orders Aleksei Orlov's loyalist Horse Guards to disperse them. Orlov's attack fails.

Nicholas then orders for artillery to fire grapeshot/canister shots on the revolting regiments. Many rebel soldiers are killed and the remaining spontaneously flee to the frozen-over Neva River. On the Neva, Bestuzhev and Panov manage to reorganize their units; the rebel soldiers line up in formation on the ice so as to attempt to capture the Peter and Paul Fortress and seize its arsenal. In response, Nicholas has the artillery fire on the ice instead of directly at the rebels. Many more soldiers and officers are either killed by shrapnel or drown in the freezing Neva. Trubetskoy and Ryleyev, who have been observing the events from the crowds, leave shaken and horrified.

Meanwhile, in Kiev, Muravyov-Apostol and Bestuzhev-Ryumin mobilize the Chernigov Regiment to march on St. Petersburg to assist in the coup, unaware of the actual events that have transpired. They attempt to arrest Gebel but he resists and is repeatedly stabbed by both Muravyov-Apostol and Bestuzhev-Ryumin.

The following January, the Chernigov Regiment is intercepted in Rzhevsky by loyalist troops equipped with artillery. Muravyov-Apostol, realizing that the coup has failed, takes the regimental banner and marches alone to negotiate. His actions inspire his subordinate officers to advance against the loyalists, prompting the loyalists to attack. Muravyov-Apostol is wounded by artillery as loyalist cavalry charge the Chernigov Regiment.

In the wake of the failed uprising, Trubetskoy is personally admonished by Nicholas. Ryleyev, facing arrest, is rebuked by Mordvinov but he remains defiant in his beliefs.

In the summer of 1826, the five leaders of the uprising–Kakhovsky, Bestuzhev-Ryumin, Muravyov-Apostol, Ryleyev, and Pestel - are taken out to be hanged. Some of the ropes snap, causing three of the condemned to fall violently onto the ground. As the executioners scramble to hang them again, a bloodied Muravyov-Apostol imagines an alternate version of the meeting with Alexander I wherein the late Tsar agrees to drink champagne with his guards.

== Cast ==
Most of the male performers with speaking parts in the cast played characters in the military, in particular the Imperial Russian Army. The female speaking parts represented Russian women in the nobility and royal family.

Cast
Performer	Role
Leonid Bichevin	Sergey Muravyov-Apostol, a podpolkovnik of the Chernigov Regiment revolt
Maksim Matveyev	Prince Sergei Trubetskoy, a polkovnik of the guard, duty officer of the General Staff
Pavel Priluchny	Pavel Pestel, a polkovnik, commander of the Vyatka Regiment
Ivan Yankovsky	Mikhail Bestuzhev-Ryumin, a podporuchik in the Chernigov Regiment
Anton Shagin	Kondraty Ryleyev, poet, journalist
Ivan Kolesnikov	Emperor of All Russia Nicholas I
Aleksandr Domogarov	Count Miloradovich, military governor-general of Saint Petersburg
Igor Petrenko	Baranov, a demoted major, grenadier of the Chernigov Regiment
Sergey Peregudov	Artarmon Muravyov, a polkovnik, commander of the Akhtyr Hussars
Vitali Kishchenko	Emperor of All Russia Alexander I
Aleksei Guskov	Prince Aleksei Scherbatov, the general of the lnfantry of Kiev
Sergey Koltakov	Count Nikolay Mordvinov, a senator
Aleksandr Ustyugov	Prince Alexey Orlov, a general-adjutant, commander of Life Guard Horse Regiment
Vladislav Vetrov	Gustav Gebel, a podpolkovnik, commander of the Chernigov Regiment
Aleksandr Lazarev Jr.	Alexander von Benckendorff, a general of the cavalry
Artyom Tkachenko	Amphelt, a polkovnik
Efim Petrunin	Ivan Sukhinov, a poruchik of the Chernigov Regiment
Pavel Barshak	Baron Veniamin Solovyev, a stabs-kapitan of the Chernigov Regiment
Kirill Kuznetsov	Mikhail Dipillo, a poruchik of the Chernigov Regiment
Anton Feoktistov	Anastasi Kuzmin, a poruchik, commander of the 5th Musketeer Company of the Chernigov Regiment
Andrey Martynov	Hippolyte Muravyov-Apostol, a praporshchik of the quartermaster
Sergey Agafonov	Pyotr Kakhovsky, a retired poruchik
Dmitriy Lysenkov	Prince Yevgeny Obolensky, a poruchik of the Life-Guard Finlands Regiment
Aleksandr Stroev	Baron Peter Frederiks, a major general, the Active Privy Councillor
Mikhail Eliseev	Aleksei Yushnevsky, a quartermaster general of the 2nd army, the Active State Councillor
Aleksandr Ratnikov	Chistov, a major of the Chernigov Regiment
Pavel Vorozhtsov	Arkady Mayboroda, a captain of the Vyatka Regiment
Sergey Vlasov	Ivan Dibich, a general-adjutant. Chief of General Staff Building
Yury Baturin	Alexander Chernyshev, a general-adjutant
Dmitry Palamarchuk	Vasily Mikulin, a polkovnik
Kirill Zaytsev	Mikhail Bestuzhev, a stabs-kapitan in the Life-Guards Moscow Regiment
Yuri Borisov	Anton Arbuzov, a leytenant of the Naval Equipage of the Imperial Guard
Aleksandr Metyolkin	Nikolai Panov, a poruchik of the Life-Guards Moscow Regiment
Anton Momot	Prince Dmitry Schepin-Rostovsky, a stabs-kapitan of the Life-Guards Moscow Regiment
Maksim Blinov	Ilya Bakunin, a praporshchik
Aleksey Oding	Baron Fedor Geismaer, general of the cavalry
Petar Zekavica	Fedor Schwartz, a polkovnik, commander of the Semyonovsky Regiment
Sergey Umanov	Yevsei, Sergey Muravyov-Apostol's batman
Vladislav Reznik	Pavel Golenichtchev-Koutouzov, a general
Sofya Zaika	Anna Belskaya
Ingeborga Dapkūnaitė	Princess Belskaya, Anna's mother
Elena Lotova	Alexandra Feodorovna, wife of Nicholas I
Marina Konyashkina	Princess Ekaterina Trubetskaya
Larisa Malevannaya	Yekaterina Nelidova

== Production ==
=== Development ===
The film's historical consultant was Oksana Ivanovna Kiyanskaya. The film Union of Salvation is a project of the Direktsiya kino (the main partner of which is state-funded Channel One of Russian television) and the company 20th Century Fox CIS. The project was initially announced in 2013. The script was written by Nikita Vysotskiy, he originally appeared as a director. And now in the director's chair Andrei Kravchuk, who worked with the Direktsiya kino on the films Admiral, a 2008 and Viking (film), a 2016 historical war film. The first teaser pictures have appeared in theaters.

The film's cameraman, Igor Grinyakin, also previously worked on the projects of the Cinema Directorate Studio. Producers of the film were Konstantin Ernst and Anatoly Maksimov.

=== Filming ===
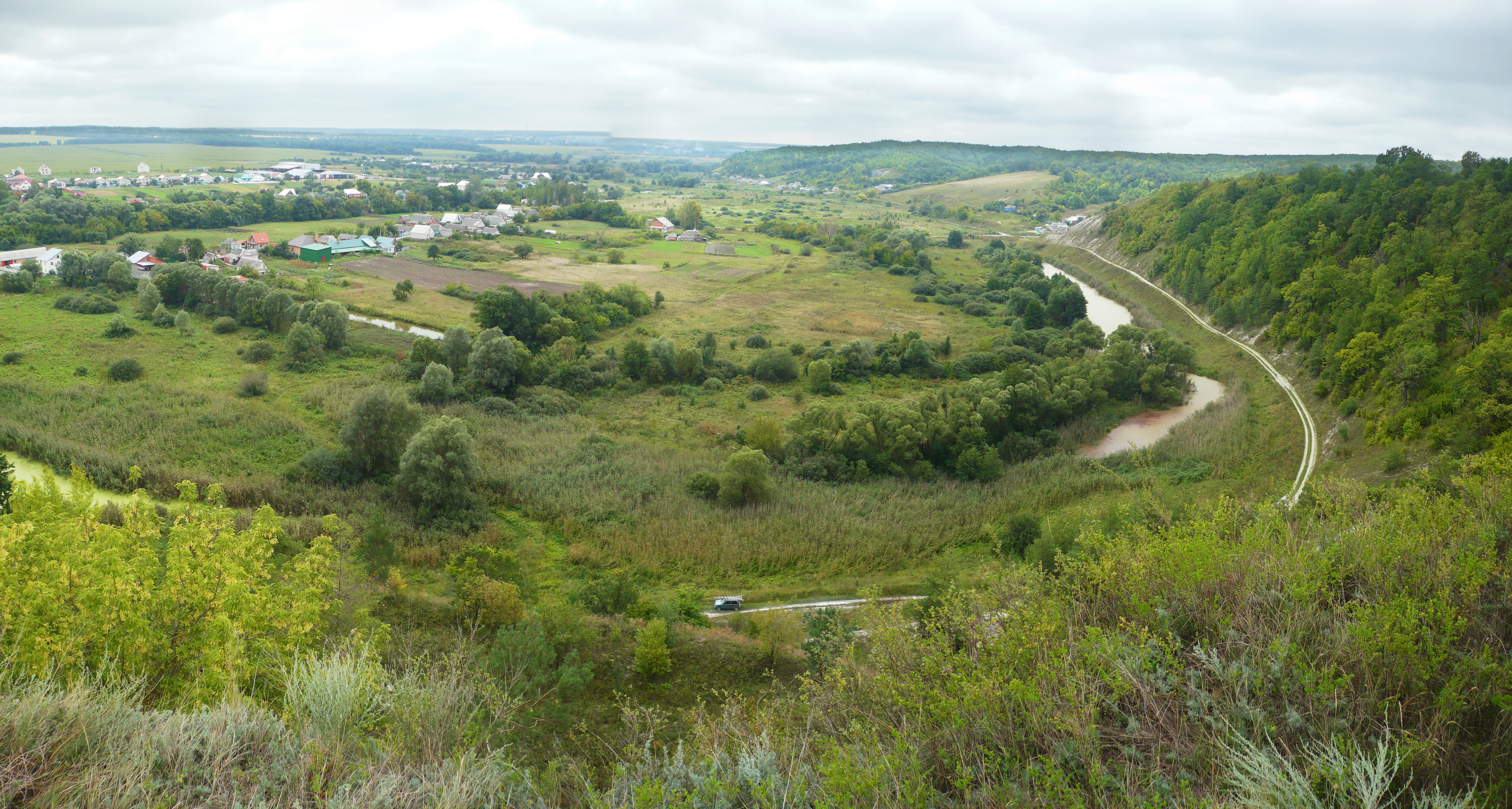
Scenes were shot in the selo of Dmitriyevka.

Principal photography began in summer 2018 and took place the selo of Dmitriyevka, Shebekinsky District, Belgorod Oblast, playing the role of the village of Vasilkova, where the rebel regiment was seized. The place was chosen because of the similarity of natural landscapes. The objects in the hollow during the filming were grouped so that one was the background for the others. The movie village was created specifically for filming. It consists of 22 houses, a temple, Russian well, beehives, awnings and bridges. Now in the village a museum - a film company "Cinema Directorate Studio" donated the buildings of the local administration.

The four houses in the cinema are "game houses", they are rented not only outside but also inside. They have almost everything necessary for life, even a real Russian stove. Now there is one less building in the movie village. The drinking establishment (shinok), as required by the scenario, burned down in the Belgorod Oblast.

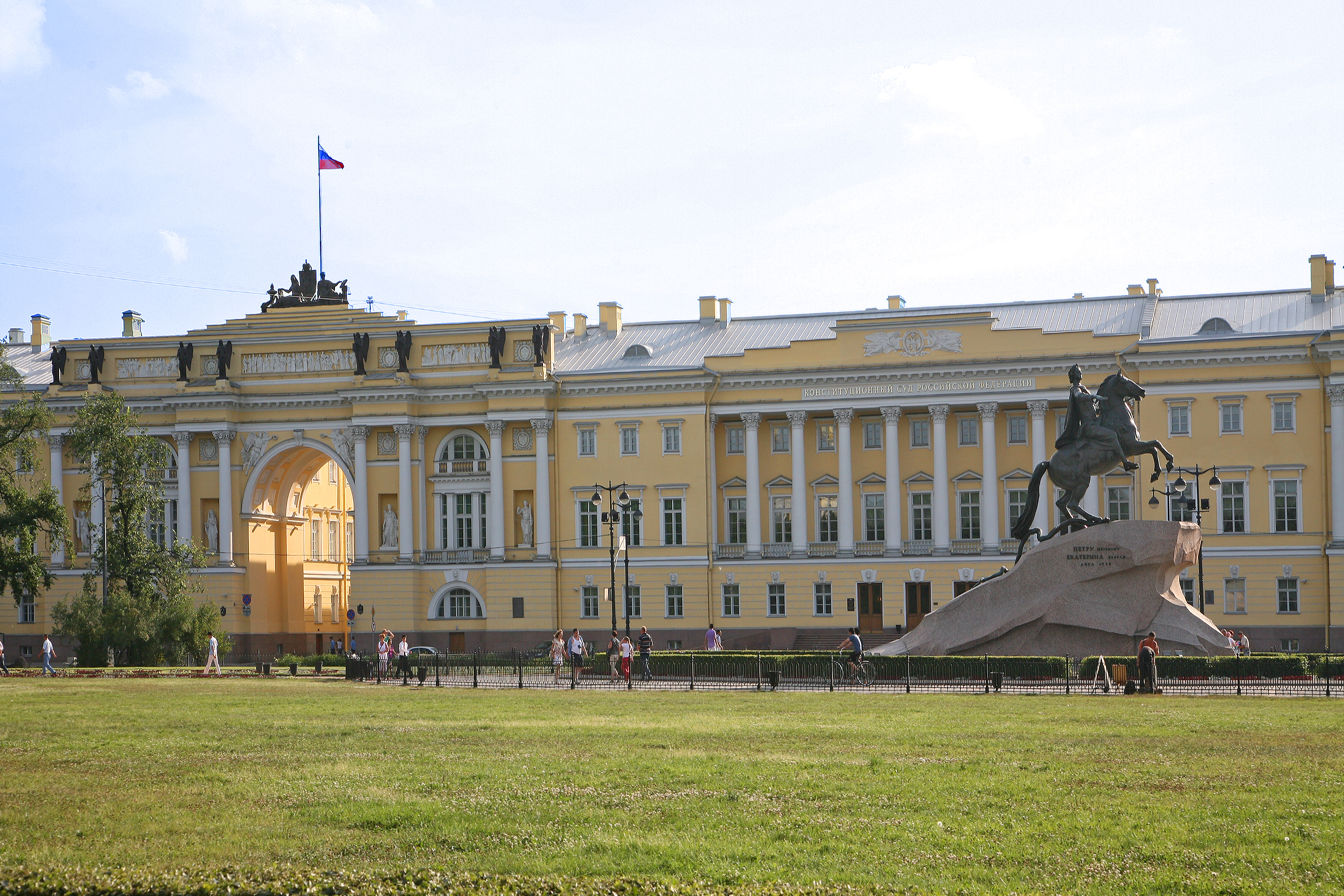
Senate Square (Saint Petersburg)

The events that took place in the city of Saint Petersburg had to be partially filmed in the pavilions. For the mass scene of the uprising on December 14, 1825, the largest pavilion in the country with an area of more than 40 thousand m2 was equipped. Specifically for this purpose, a chromakey was sewn, which actually covered the entire building from the inside. Full-scale shooting took place on Palace Square, in the Peter and Paul Fortress, Tsarskoye Selo, Yusupov Palace and Saint Michael's Castle. The Grand Gatchina Palace, the town of Gatchina, Leningrad Oblast.

Exact copies were made of 1806 12-pounder guns which were used in the war with Napoleon, and then in the Senate square during the uprising.

The banners of the rebel regiments in the film exactly repeat the standards of the rebels. It took at least a month to create one canvas manually.

During the filming of the climax, the Senate square in Saint Petersburg was freezing - the air temperature dropped to -24 °C, which felt like -30 °C due to high humidity, so rosy cheeks and reddened noses are not make-up. Actors and extras were saved by thermal underwear and warmed up in vehicles in between takes.

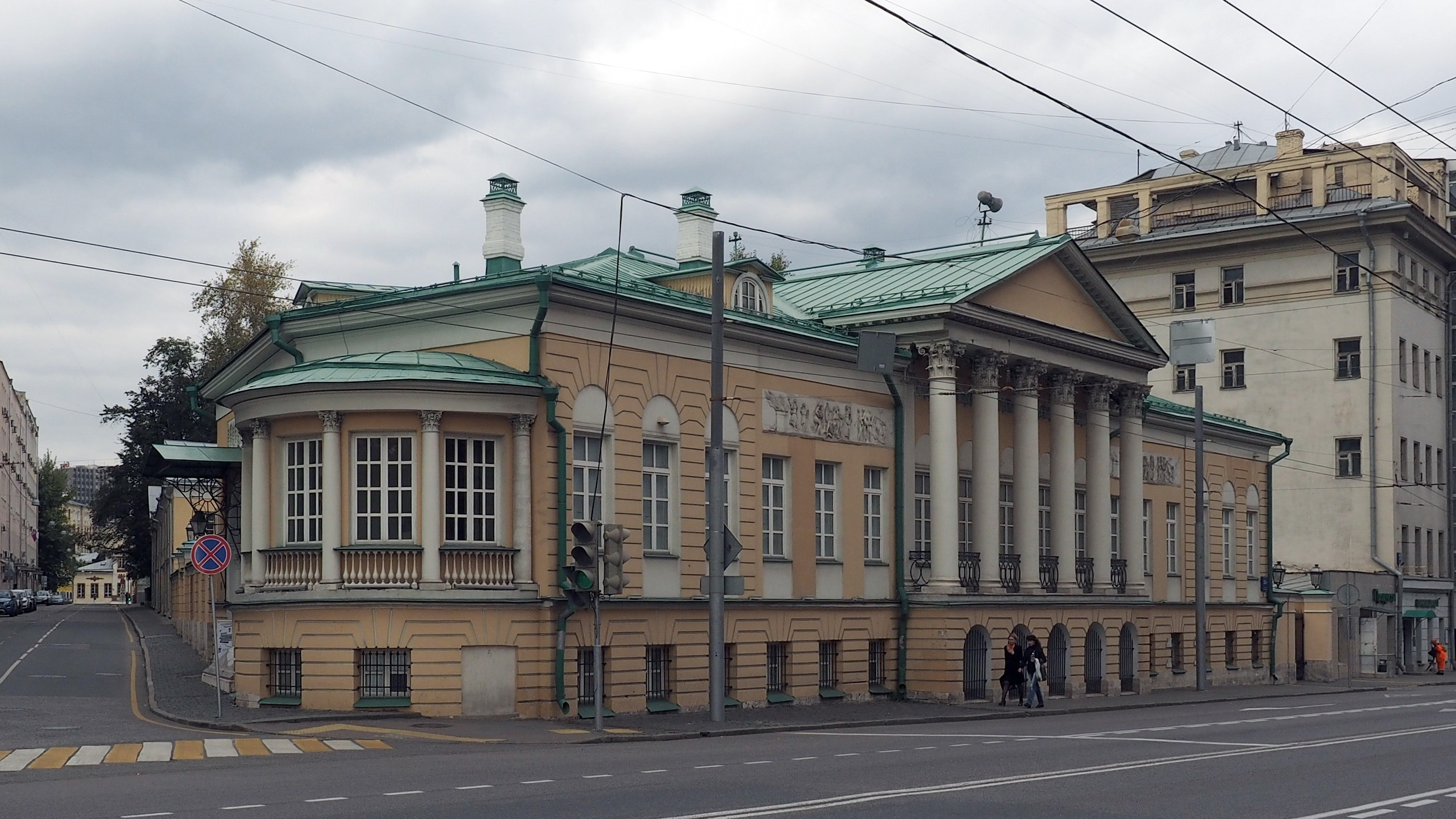
Muravyov-Apostol's house in Moscow

Part of the shooting took place in a historical place: a house belonging to the Muravyev-Apostol family in Moscow.

The military and reenactors advised the crew so that the costumes, and movements and the cast of the actors were appropriate for the era. In addition to the main characters, they worked with actors of mass scenes. During the filming, about 1800 people acted in the role of soldiers, and each of them underwent special training.

Most of the costumes created for the film are military. Broadcloth for them was woven at a factory near Moscow, which preserved the traditions of production at that time.

Since the film takes place at the beginning of the 19th century, when sideburns and mustaches were in fashion, make-up artists had to make hundreds of different designs so that each actor got a set of the right color.

Gold epaulettes for uniforms were made by hand.

The craftsmen made 500 overcoats for ordinary infantrymen. With the help of parts and accessories, the costumes were modified for the filming of different regiments.

For the main characters of the film, 5-6 costumes were sewn, because in different years they served in different ranks.

Hats were made for the ladies. Handbags, umbrellas, gloves and shoes were searched at flea markets or made to order. References were sought in the literature and painting of that time.

=== Post-production ===
The film Union of Salvation was created using the latest technology. As its creators say, it is "almost fantasy" in terms of the number of computer graphics. However, there was no need to build new worlds; the graphics were needed to restore the old ones. As a result, the viewer is able to see Petersburg exactly as the Decembrists saw it.

The scale of events is transmitted using lighting, computer graphics and photogrammetry. For example, a soldier was photographed with a device consisting of many cameras. Thus, it was possible to create 3D models of real actors, which then filled the frame. And if during the shooting of mass scenes on the site there were 300-500 artists, then on the screen there will be several times more.

For a year and a half, the entire production process was recorded on a 360-degree camera Samsung 360 Round. This is the first such experience in Russian cinema. With the help of computer graphics, Saint Petersburg was recreated in the first third of the 19th century: Saint Isaac's Cathedral stands in the woods, because then it was only being built, and the Winter Palace was pale terracotta in color.

== Soundtrack ==
Union of Salvation: The Movie Soundtrack

Soundtrack album by Dmitriy Emelyanov
- Released: 6 March 2020
- Genre: soundtrack
- Length: 1:10:00
- Labels: Navigator Records (in Russian); Hollywood Records (in English)
- Producer: Aleksey Vladimirovich Kozin

On 18 December 2019, the main premiere of Union of Salvation was held in Moscow. The musical design of the picture was done by Navigator Records (ru).

The famous film composer Dmitriy Emelyanov (ru) worked on the soundtrack for the Union of Salvation. Dmitry's original author's compositions sound in the film, including the title theme of the Union of Salvation.

The soundtrack of the film was written by composer Dmitriy Emelyanov, the theme of the song was written by singer Vasiliy Vakulenko ("Basta") and was called "Sensara". The film was produced by Hollywood Records, with Dmitriy Emelyanov processing at the request of producer, Konstantin Ernst, other famous tunes in Russia such as Mumiy Troll's "Vladivostok 2000", Nautilus Pompilius's "Water Walks", Med Dog's "Fly Away", All are played in a film accompanied by symphony. Aleksey Kozin, the film's music producer, said collaboration with Emelyanov is an interesting and enjoyable process since Emelyanov is a professional and talented person in his field.

Dmitriy Emelyanov, composer and arranger of the film, said, "It was a great pleasure for me as a musician to become part of such a large-scale project and collaborate with famous film producers - Konstantin Lvovich Ernst and Anatoly Vadimovich Maksimov".

Aleksey Kozin, musical producer of the film, said, "Cooperation with Dmitriy Emelyanov is always a very interesting and enjoyable process. Dmitriy is a true professional and talented person with his own style".

== Release ==
Union of Salvation is the premiere of the film took place on December 18, 2019, at the Moscow cinema "October". The film was released in the Russian Federation by 20th Century Fox CIS (through Walt Disney Studios Motion Pictures) on December 26, 2019.

== TV series ==
The preparations for the production of a TV series began in August 2020, when its producers submitted a request for support to the Russian Ministry of Culture. On January 24, 2021, filming began for the TV series named Union of Salvation: Time of Fury (Союз Спасения. Время гнева) produced by Direktsiya Kino and Konstantin Ernst from state-funded Channel One Russia who also produced the motion picture. The series is an addition and sequel to the movie. Nikita Vysotsky attached as writer and director with Anatoly Maximov as executive producer. The project is based on the idea of a more detailed description of the events presented in the film itself.

The series includes actor Kirill Kuznetsov, who plays the Chernigov Battalion soldier Mikhail Shchfilo, Anton Momot as staff officer Dmitry Shchepin-Rostovsky, Andrei Martinov as Apollyt Moraviov-Apostol, Tikhon Zhiznevsky, with most of the film's actors: Ivan Yankovsky, who returns to play Mikhail Stuhzhev-Ryumin, Anton Shagin, Maxim Matveyev, Sergei Agaponov, Pavel Vorozhzov, Leonid Bitchevin, Alexei Goskov, Ivan Kolesnikov, Alex Pavel Prilucniy and Igor Petrenko.

== Reception ==
The film was released on December 26, 2019. It was the most expensive Russian film of the year, with a budget of 980 million RUB (roughly $16.1 million at exchange rates at the time).

=== Critical response ===
Film critic Egor Moskvitin in an interview with Kommersant FM radio station noted:

On the one hand, you can really perceive this movie as complementary to young people, idealists who are ready to give their lives for the fatherland. On the other hand, this film can be interpreted as the story that any upheaval leads to even greater tragedies. The rush of the Decembrists was more idealistic than sensible.

In turn, the critic of the network publication "Kanobu.Ru" Angelina Gura said:

There are many characters and they are disclosed exactly as much as a two-hour film allows about one of the most famous events of the past. Therefore, the Union of Salvation can be attributed to the category of historical films only, without any life inside.

According to S.N. Rudnik, head of the Department of History of St. Petersburg Mining University, the film contains a number of distortions of historical facts (for example, the dialogue between Nicholas I and S. Trubetskoy).

Union of Salvation received seven awards in Russia: for best supporting actor (Alexander Domogarov), cinematography, visual effects, costumes, makeup, sound engineer and production designer.

== See also ==
- The Decembrists (1927), a Soviet silent historical drama film
- The Captivating Star of Happiness (1975), a Soviet film
