= Forced march =

Forced march may refer to:

- Forced march (military exercise), also known as loaded march, where military personnel do it for practice
- Forced march (maneuver), where military personnel engage in warfare
- Forced march (war crime), also known as death march, where people are often left to die
- Forced march (displacement), where people are coerced to migrate
- Forced March, 1989 American-Hungarian historical war drama film
- The Forced March, 2003 Russian action war film

== See also ==
- Foot march
