= Aleksandr Ustyugov =

Russian actor, musician, film and stage director

- Александр Устюгов
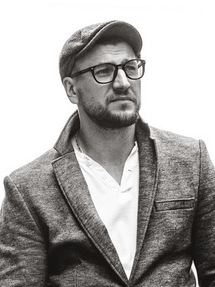
- Born: Aleksandr Sergeevich Ustyugov; 17 October 1976 (age 49); Ekibastuz, Pavlodar Region, Kazakh SSR, USSR
- Citizenship: Kazakhstan → Russia
- Occupations: Actor, musician, film and stage director
- Years active: 1996–present

Aleksandr Sergeevich Ustyugov (Russian: Александр Сергеевич Устюгов; born 17 October 1976) is a Russian actor, film director and musician. He is best known for his role as a main character Roman Shilov for 60 episodes of Cop Wars (TV mini-series) between 2005 and 2010 (ru), also as Victor Toropov in the 2019 Netflix TV series Better than Us.

== Early life ==
Aleksandr Ustyugov was born in the city of Ekibastuz, Pavlodar Region, Kazakh SSR, Soviet Union (now Kazakhstan). After graduating from Ekibastuz secondary school No. 15, he entered vocational school No. 18, specialising in "Electrical Repair, Installation and Dismantling of Mining Equipment". He graduated from vocational school with honours, while working on the Vostochny Coal Mine.

Aleksandr studied at art school for five years between 1988 and 1993 and during this time practised boxing at the Sports School Zhasyby.

== Acting career ==
Aleksandr Ustyugov continued his education in Omsk, where in 1993 he entered the Omsk State Transport University with a degree in "Carriage Engineering". He studied there for full-time for three semesters, before transferring to the Omsk Youth Theatre as an illuminator, before joining the theater's troupe. Omsk audience remembered the brilliant performance of the role of the Spider in the ballet extravaganza in verses from the life of insects Fly-Tsokotuha directed by Boris Krichmar.

In 1996 Aleksandr entered the Omsk Regional College of Culture and Art (at OmTUZ), then in 1999 attended the Boris Shchukin Theatre Institute for a further 3 years. After graduating from it, he moved to Moscow, where in 1999 he entered the Higher Theater School named after B.V. Schukin (course of Rodion Yurievich Ovchinnikov).

He made many appearance in theatre productions before landing his first movie role in the 2002 film The Star.

In 2003, upon graduation, he was invited to the troupe of the Russian Academic Youth Theater (RAMT) in Moscow, where he served until 2014. In 2014 Aleksandr moved to live in Saint Petersburg.

In 2018, Ustyugov was nominated for the TEFI Award in the category "Best Actor in a TV Series" for his lead role in the TV series "The Golden Horde". In 2019, Ustyugov played the main villainous character Victor Toropov in 16 episodes of the Netflix TV series Better than Us

=== Personal life ===
In August 2005, Aleksandr married actress Yanina Sokolovskaya, with whom he studied together on the same course at the Shchukin Theater School. In 2007, they had a daughter, Yevgeniya, and in 2015 the marriage broke up. In September 2015, Aleksandr married the daughter of a famous businessman, Anna Ozar, but three months later the marriage broke up.

=== Ekibastuz Group ===
In 2015, Ustyugov created his own musical group called "Ekibastuz". The group performs in the genre of St. Petersburg Rock. The band peeked on January 19, 2017 in the concert hall "Coliseum" in St. Petersburg, for the presentation of the debut album "Roads" written by Ustyugov who was also lead vocals.

=== Honours ===
In 2017 Aleksandr was awarded the title "Honorary Citizen of Ekibastuz" was awarded for his contribution to the socio-economic development of the Ekibastuz region.

== Filmography ==
=== Film ===
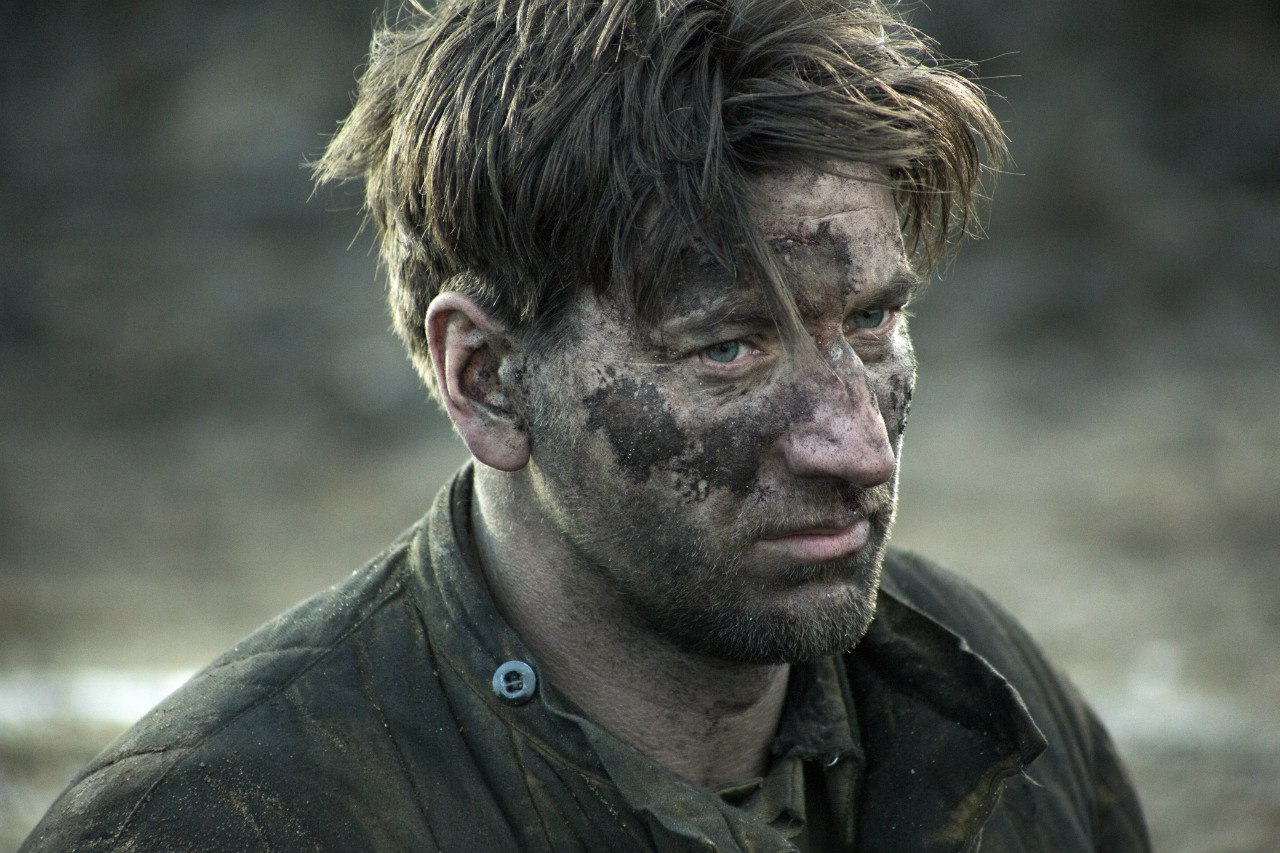
Panfilov's 28 Men (2016), the historical war film.

Year	Title	Role	Notes
2006	Moscow Mission	Martin's Aide	
2014	Sunstroke	Navy Officer Vladimir Yumatov	
2016	Rhapsody of Leningrad		
2016	Panfilov's 28 Men	Ivan Moskalenko, Red Army	
2016	Viking	Yaropolk I Sviatoslavich	
2019	Union of Salvation	Prince Alexey Orlov, a general-adjutant, commander of Horse guards	
2020	White Snow	Maksimych, instructor	

=== Television ===
Year	Title	Role	Notes
2002	The Star	German soldier in the barn (uncredited)	
2005–2010	Cop Wars	Roman Shilov	60 episodes (ru)
2006	Petya Velikolepny	Petr Kotelnikov	
2008	Fathers and Sons	Evgeniy Bazarov	(ru)
2011	The sorrows of joy of Hope	Oleg, businessman	
2012	Snipers: Love under the Crosshairs	Capt. Subbotin	
2013	Hello from Katyusha	Kapitan Ermakov	4 episodes
2013	My last name is Shilov (Cop Wars)	Roman Shilov	TV movie (ru)
2014	Tiger footprint	Vlad Sazhin, leader of a criminal gang	TV movie
2017	Raid	Pargas	
2018	The Golden Horde	Prince Yaroslav	16 episodes (ru)
2018	Godunov	Fiodor Romanow	(ru)
2018–2019	Better than Us	Victor Toropov, Head of CRONOS Corporation	16 episodes
2020	Ricochet	Denis	16 episodes
2020	hunting for a Singer (Okhota na pevitsu)	Vladislav Sergeyevich Gordin	1 episode (ru)
2021	Central Russia's Vampires	Klim	3 episodes – 6, 7, 8 (ru)
2021	Vertinsky	Serzh	1 episode
2021	Mikhailov's Method	Mihailov	1 episode (ru)
2021	Alibi	Zavadsky	13 episodes (ru)
2025	Konstantinopol	Sergey Neratov	
2026	Knyaz Andrey	Anbal Yasin	
