= Vladimir Timiryov =

Russian painter (1914–1938)

Vladimir Sergeyevich Timiryov (Timirev; Владимир Сергеевич Тимирёв; 1914–1938) was a Russian avant garde painter and a victim of Joseph Stalin's Great Purge.

== Life ==
Vladimir Timirev was born in 1914 as the son of Admiral Sergey Nikolayevich Timiryov of the Russian Imperial Navy. His mother was the poet Anna Timiryova. His maternal grandfather was the composer orchestra conductor Vasily Ilyich Safonov. In 1918, when he was only four years old, his parents separated. His mother commenced a common law marriage with Rear Admiral Alexander Kolchak, who became Vladimir's "stepfather." Vladimir's father Sergey subsequently moved to China as a White émigré.

During the Russian Civil War, Alexander Kolchak led one of the largest factions of the anti-communist White Movement based at Omsk. In February 1920, Vladimir's stepfather was betrayed by his allies and handed over to the Bolsheviks in Irkutsk. He was given a cursory trial and shot, whereupon his body was cast into the frozen Angara River. For decades after his death, however, their association with Kolchak would have dire consequences for Vladimir and his mother. Anna was arrested numerous times following Kolchak's execution and also endured imprisonment in the Gulag

Vladimir Timirev graduated from the Moscow Architectural Institute. Upon completing his first year in 1930, he worked on the construction site of the Bobrikov Chemical Industrial Complex. After graduation, he worked as an artist and book illustrator. Jack London’s book “Northern Tales” was published with Timirev’s illustrations. He published his drawings in newspapers for the reviews of stage plays.

Timirev participated in a science and research expedition to the Caspian Sea in 1935. During the expedition, he produced many sketches, drawings and water colours on the subject of the Caspian Sea. He also created a series of works about Vyshniy Volochok.

== Arrest and execution ==
He was arrested by the NKVD in 1938 and shortly afterwards executed by shooting. Apparently, the reason was an anonymous denunciation made by friends. The denunciation referred to the fact that Vladimir was the "stepson" of Admiral Kolchak, who was demonized in the Soviet propaganda of the time.
