= The White Horse (series) =

1993 film by Gely Ryabov

The White Horse is a Russian TV serial broadcast in 1993. The film, in 10 episodes, was directed by Gelii Ryabov. It presents the Russian civil war in Siberia from 1917–1920 and the struggle of the White Russians under the command of Admiral Alexander Kolchak against the Bolshevik forces, until his final defeat.

== Plot ==
The series was the first important cinematographic production after the fall of the Soviet Union to address the subject of the Russian Revolution and Civil War from 1917 to 1920. The series presents the fates of several characters on both sides of the conflict, caught in the turmoil of events beyond their control. It also shows important events which took place in that period, such as the assassination of Tsar Nicholas II and his family, as well as the struggle of Admiral Alexander Kolchak, head of state of counter-revolutionary Russia until his defeat by the Bolsheviks. The director does not take sides and presents the revolution and the civil war as a cruel and senseless confrontation between two parts of the people, in which nobody is a real winner and all ordinary people are losers.

== Actors and roles ==
Player	Role
Gennadii Glagolyev	
Anatolii Guzenko	Admiral Alexander Kolchak
Veronika Izotova	Anna Timiryova and Anfisa Timiriova
Vladimir Simonov	Deboltsov
Yekaterina Belikova	Nadya
Elina Suvorova	Vera
Valerii Doronin	Korochkin
Vladimir Belousov	Babin
Anatoli Petrov	Novozhilov
Aleksandr Baluyev	Panchkin
Andrey Krasko	Somov
Ivan I. Krasko	American
Roman Ryazantsev	
Gelii Sysoyev	
Vladimir Dyukov	
Alexei Devotchenko	Chekist
Nikolai Kochegarov	

== See also ==
- The Admiral, the 2008 biopic about Kolchak
