= Turczyński =

Turczyński is a Polish masculine surname. Its feminine counterpart is Turczyńska. In other Slavic countries it may be transliterated as Turchinsky (masculine; Russian: Турчинский, Ukrainian: Турчинський) or Turchinskaya (feminine). The surname may refer to:

- Józef Turczyński (1884–1953), Polish pianist, pedagogue and musicologist
- Larisa Turchinskaya (born 1965), Russian heptathlete, wife of Vladimir
- Vladimir Turchinsky (1963–2009), Russian actor, strongman and media personality
