= Elena Beckman-Shcherbina =

Russian pianist (1882–1951)

Elena Aleksandrovna Bekman-Shcherbina (Russian: Елена Александровна Бекман-Щербина; née Kamentseva; 12 January 1882 – 30 September 1951) was a Russian and Soviet pianist, composer and teacher.

== Origins ==
Born Elena Aleksandrovna Kamentseva, she was adopted by her mother's sister after the death of her mother. In gratitude, she took her adoptive mother's surname, Shcherbina.

== Musical career ==
In 1888, at just six years old, Elena started music lessons with Valentina Zograf. Later that year she was trained by Nikolai Zverev privately and thereafter at the Moscow Conservatory. In 1893, it was Pavel Pabst who tutored Elena, and four years later, Vasily Safonov.

== Achievements ==
In 1899, Elena received a gold medal from the Moscow Conservatory. A year later, she appeared with the Schubert Trio in B flat major at the Russian Musical Society concert. In 1902, she began performing with Abram Jampolskij, Gregor Piatigorskij and with the Beethoven Quartet, in addition to appearances as a soloist.

From 1912 to 1921 Elena performed works by Alexander Scriabin, Claude Debussy, Maurice Ravel and Isaac Albéniz, the first pianist in Moscow to do so. She began to give solo performances that were broadcast on the radio in 1924.

She performed for soldiers and at music schools and gave concerts at the Philharmonic Hall. Recordings of her performances were published by Aprelevskij zavod. She wrote and published piano pieces for children. Her memoir Moi wospominanija was first published in 1962.

== Acclaim ==
According to musicologist Aleksandr D. Alekseyev, “her artistic nature makes it impossible for her to want to show off, to parade her technique instead of art. Her playing is clear, natural, aiming towards embracing the form [...]. She is especially brilliant at pieces of light and lyrical character, composed in transparent, watercolour tones.”

== Music teacher ==
Elena gave private piano lessons in 1894. From 1908 she taught at The Gnesins School of Music. For six years from 1912, she had her own piano school. She then taught at Alexander Scriabin’s music school, and finally she returned to The Gnesins School of Music, for two-and-a-half decades. Between 1921 and 1930 she gave a seminar on contemporary French music at the Moscow Conservatory. She then lectured at the Central Extramural Institute of Music.
