= In August of 1944 =

2001 film by Michaił Ptašuk

- Directed by: Mikhail Ptashuk
- Written by: Vladimir Bogomolov
- Produced by: Olga Semago; Vladimir Semago
- Starring: Yevgeny Mironov; Vladislav Galkin
- Cinematography: Vladimir Sporyshkov
- Music by: Alexander Gradsky
- Release date: 4 May 2001
- Running time: 109 minutes
- Countries: Russia; Belarus
- Language: Russian

In August 1944 (Russian: В августе 44-го…; better known as The Moment of Truth) is a 2001 Russian-Belarusian action film directed by Mikhail Ptashuk.

== Plot ==
A Soviet counter-intelligence (SMERSH) team is assigned to track down a group of German spies in Belarus following Operation Bagration, as Soviet armies drive into Poland.

== Cast ==
- Yevgeny Mironov as Capt. Pavel Alekhin
- Vladislav Galkin as Senior Lt. Yevgeny Tamantsev
- Yuri Kolokolnikov as Lt. Blinov
- Alexei Petrenko as General Yegorov
- Aleksandr Feklistov as Cipher Officer Polyakov
- Beata Tyszkiewicz as Grolinskaya
- Karolina Gruszka as Yuliya
- Ramaz Chkhikvadze as Stalin
- Aleksandr Baluev as Mishchenko
- Albert Filozov as Ivan Semyonovich
- Yaroslav Boyko as Captain Anikushin
- Vladimir Semago as lieutenant-colonel
- Alexei Makarov as Major-tanker
