= Voroshilov Sharpshooter (film) =

The Voroshilov Sharpshooter
- Directed by: Stanislav Govorukhin
- Written by: Aleksandr Borodyanskiy; Stanislav Govorukhin; Yuri Polyakov; Viktor Pronin
- Based on: Woman on Wednesdays by Viktor Pronin
- Produced by: Yevgeni Golynsky, Igor Tolstunov
- Starring: Mikhail Ulyanov; Anna Sinyakina; Aleksandr Porokhovshchikov
- Cinematography: Gennadi Engstrem
- Edited by: Vera Kruglova
- Music by: Vladimir Dashkevich
- Production company: NTV-PROFIT
- Distributed by: Most-Cinematograph
- Release date: 1999
- Running time: 95 minutes
- Country: Russia
- Language: Russian

The Voroshilov Sharpshooter (Russian: Ворошиловский стрелок, romanized: Voroshilovskiy strelok, named after a badge for marksmanship; also translated as The Rifleman of the Voroshilov Regiment) is a 1999 Russian vigilante drama film directed by Stanislav Govorukhin based on the book Woman on Wednesdays (Женщина по средам, Zhenshchina po sredam) by Viktor Pronin. The concept loosely resembles the rape and revenge genre. The film became successful with numerous awards given for the film including the prestigious Russian Guild of Film Critics 1999 for best actor by Mikhail Ulyanov. It also has 1 win and 3 nominations for Nika Awards.

== Plot ==
In the summer of 1999, a decorated World War II veteran, Ivan Afonin, lives with his granddaughter Katya. In a nearby flat, three bored youths, Vadim Pashutin, local businessman Boris Chukhanov and student Igor Zvorygin, kill time by designating Wednesdays as a day of sexual gratification and hiring a prostitute. On this particular Wednesday, they fail to acquire one, and decide to resort to a random female passerby instead. They lure Katya to their flat under the pretense of "a birthday party" and rape her. Initially, the offenders are arrested; however, Vadim's father Nikolai is a senior figure in the police and uses his influence to have the charges against his son and his friends dropped.

Frustrated at the offenders having escaped justice, Ivan sells his dacha for $5000 and uses the money to purchase an SVD sniper rifle equipped with a silencer from an illegal weapons trader. While testing his purchase in the presence of the seller, he hits all the test targets perfectly, making the seller call him "a true Voroshilov Sharpshooter" in admiration.

When a female neighbour goes on a trip, she leaves Ivan the keys to her flat so he can look after her parrot. Ivan tours the flat and discovers that it is situated directly in front of and overlooks the offenders’ flat. From there, he begins to administer vigilante justice. Taking care not to kill the offenders, he instead cripples them. First, he shoots Zvorygin's genitals through a bottle of sparkling wine. Secondly, he causes Chukhanov's brand new car to explode, by shooting the gas tank: although Chukhanov survives, the lower half of his body is severely burnt.

Nikolai figures out that Ivan must be behind both accidents, ordering the search of Ivan's house and the second flat. However, police find nothing (Alexei, the local police officer, had found and hid the rifle in his own house a day before that). Still, Nikolai threatens Ivan, saying that should anything happen to his son, he will face severe consequences. Ivan interrupts him, saying that something has already happened (meaning that Vadim becoming a rapist clearly shows something has happened to him). Nikolai, however, takes his words literally, and rushes home, shooting out the door lock to open it (not knowing a paranoid Vadim has barricaded the door). Following the shot, Vadim shoots back through the door with a shotgun, wounding his father and, after days of fright, losing his sanity.

In the epilogue, Alexei tells Ivan of the hidden rifle and unofficially confiscates it, and at home Katya sings again, signaling her recovery and the return of domestic harmony, which moves Ivan to tears.

== Cast ==
- Mikhail Ulyanov as Ivan Fyodorovich Afonin, pensioner
- Anna Sinyakina as Katya Afonina, Ivan Fyodorovich's granddaughter
- Aleksandr Porokhovshchikov as Nikolai Petrovich Pashutin, police colonel, Vadim's father
- Vladislav Galkin as Alexei Podberyozkin, local policeman
- Irina Rozanova as Olga Ivanovna Afonina, Katya's mother
- Ilya Drevnov as Vadim Pashutin
- Alexei Makarov as Boris Chukhanov
- Marat Basharov as Igor Zvorygin
- Karen Muradyan as David «Dodik», colleague and roommate of Olga
- Sergei Aprelsky as gun seller #1
- Aleksey Shevchenkov as gun seller #2
- Oleg Komarov as gun dealer
- Sergei Garmash as police captain Kashaev
- Vitaly Logvinovsky as domino player
- Vladimir Semago as investigator Shevelyov
- Georgy Martirosyan as prosecutor

== Production ==
Anna Sinyakina was replaced by a body double in the rape scene.

== Differences from the book ==
For Ivan's first strike, he shoots the student's genitals. This diverges from the book where he shoots him in the leg.

== Reactions ==
The film proved controversial, for its graphic and violent features with some film critics describing it as a call to violence.

Several subsequent real life cases of vigilante justice have been compared to the film.

== See also ==
- Rape and revenge film

== Literature ==
- Lawton, Anna M. (2004). Imaging Russia 2000: Film and Facts. New Academia Publishing. p. 132-137. ISBN 0-9744934-2-2.
