= Vitaly Logvinovsky =

Soviet Russian actor (1941–2019)

Vitaly Logvinovsky PAR
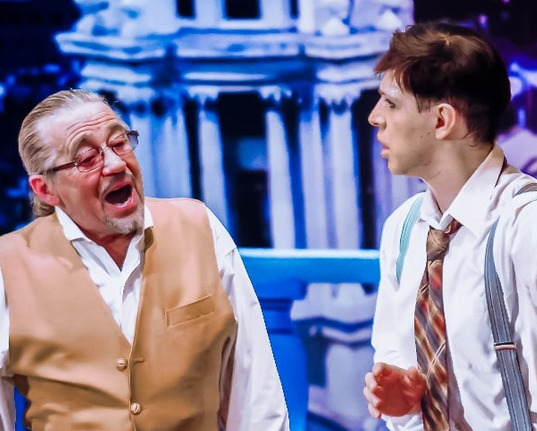
- Vitaly Logvinovsky (left) and Igor Kumitsky
- Born: Vitaly Stepanovich Logvinovsky; 17 March 1941; Shevchenko Village, Poltava Oblast, USSR
- Died: 22 August 2019 (aged 78); Kaluga, Russia
- Occupation: actor
- Years active: 1967–2019
- Spouse: Nadezhda Kosenovich
- Children: 1
- Awards: Honored Artist of the RSFSR (1983); People's Artist of Russia (2006)

Vitaly Stepanovich Logvinovsky PAR (Russian: Вита́лий Степа́нович Логвино́вский; 17 March 1941 – 22 August 2019) was a Soviet and later Russian stage and film actor.

== Biography ==
He was born on 17 March 1941. Vitaly's father worked as an accountant, his mother taught mathematics.

Vitaly did not plan to become an actor, intended to enter the design department of the Kuibyshev Aviation Institute (now Samara State Aerospace University), but his passion for the theater won.

In 1965 he graduated from GITIS.

Worked in Pavlodar Drama Theatre since 1967, later Volgograd Drama Theatre. Since 1974 — actor Kaluga Regional Drama Theatre.

Awarded Honored Artist of the RSFSR (16 November 1983) and People's Artist of Russia (15 February 2006). Repeatedly awarded with diplomas and prizes of the Department of Culture and Art of the Kaluga Oblast and Ministry of Culture of the Russia in the category Best Actor of the season.

== Death ==
Logvinovsky died on 22 August 2019 in Kaluga in the 79th year of his life after an illness.

== Works ==
=== Theatre ===
- Victor in Firm Nails Do not Do by Leonid Zhukhovitsky:
- Smerdyakov and Ivan in The Brothers Karamazov by Fyodor Dostoevsky
- Tuzenbakh in Three Sisters by Anton Chekhov
- Tyurin in Pretenders by Emil Braginsky and Eldar Ryazanov
- Ivan the Terrible in Vasilisa Melentyeva by Alexander Ostrovsky
- Podkolesin in Marriage by Nikolai Gogol
- Napoleon in Napoleon by Ferdinand Bruckner
- Lucky in Forest by Ostrovsky
- Comforting in Players by Gogol
- Gradoboev in Hot Нeart by Ostrovsky
- Scapa in Dodger by Molière
- Balyasnikov in Tales of Old Arbat by Aleksei Arbuzov
- Zheltukhin in Killer Whale by Lev Tolstoy
- Sergei Ivanovich Sakhatov in The Fruits of Enlightenment by Tolstoy
- Francis Walsingham (Minister of Police) in Private Life of the Queen by Elena Poddubnaya
- Richard Willey in №13 by Ray Cooney
- Christian Ivanovich Gibner (district doctor) in Inspector by Gogol
- Writer in Uncle's Dream by Dostoevsky
- Batu in Little Tenderness by Aldo Nicolai
- Plyushkin in Brother Chichikov by Nina Sadur
- Nyuhin; Chubukov; Howler-Sentries; comedian Svetlovidov in Svetlovidov's Benefit by Chekhov

=== Film and television ===
List of film and television credits
Year	Title	Role	Notes
1999	Voroshilov Sharpshooter	domino player	episode
2008	Gipsy Оutput	narcologist	TV series
