= Anna Timiryova =

Russian poet (1893-1975)

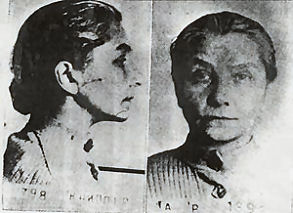
- Native name: Анна Васильевна Тимирёва
- Born: 18 July 1893
- Died: 31 January 1975 (aged 81)
- Children: Vladimir Timiryov
- Parents: Vasily Safonov

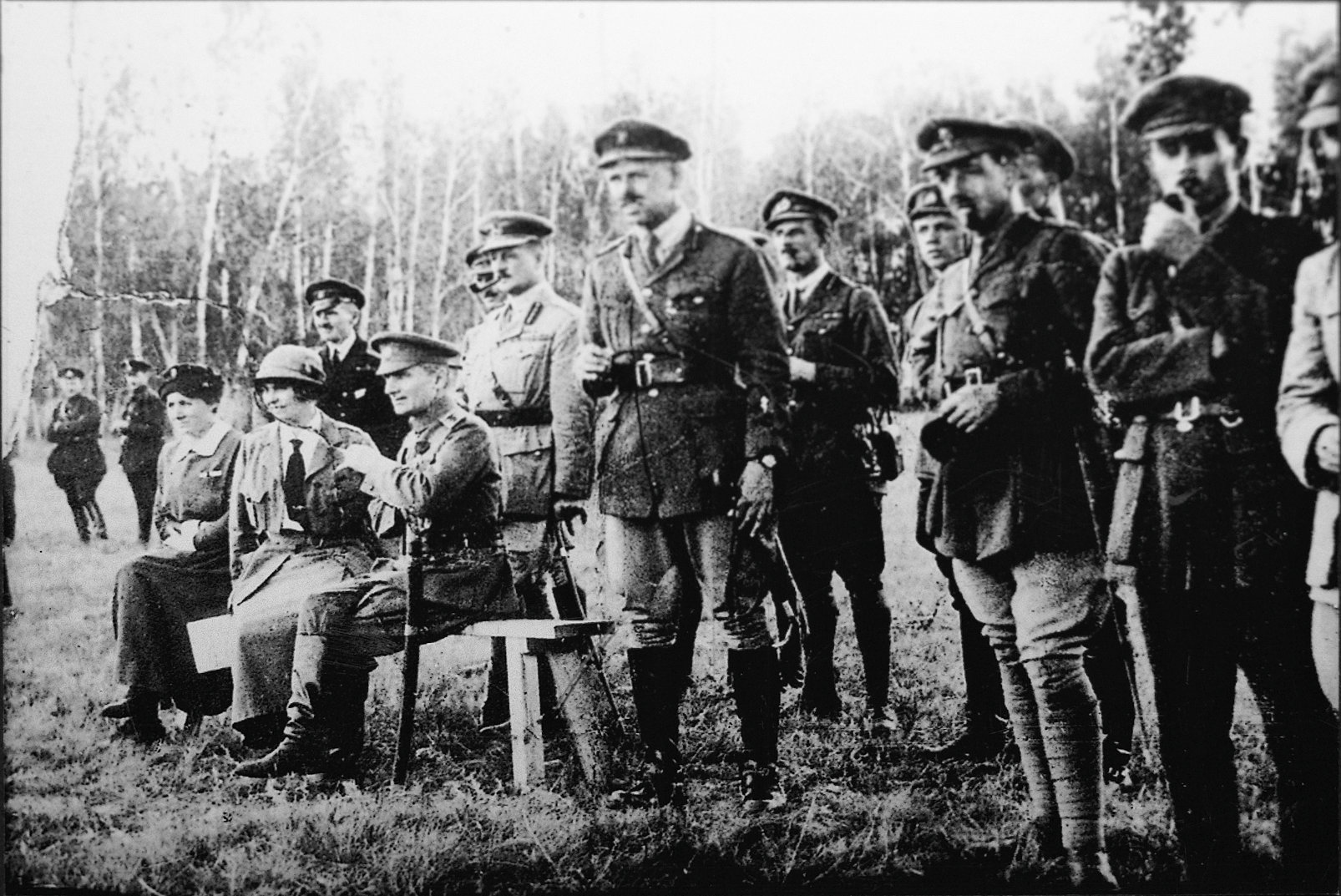
Anna Timiryova and Admiral Kolchak (seated) observing military exercises in 1919.

Anna Vasilyevna Timiryova (Russian: Анна Васильевна Тимирёва; 18 July 1893 – 31 January 1975) was a Russian poet. Born Anna Safonova, she was the daughter of composer Vasily Ilyich Safonov. At the age of 19 she married then Captain (and future Admiral) Sergey Nikolayevich Timiryov with whom she soon had a son, but whom she divorced in 1918 to join Alexander Kolchak. After Kolchak's execution in 1920, she was arrested several times and served several prison and labour camp sentences. In 1923, she married Vsevolod Kniper, a railroad engineer. She was the mother of painter Vladimir Sergeyevich Timiryov.

== Early life ==
Anna Vasilyevna Safonova was born in Kislovodsk into the family of a musician and later the manager of the Moscow Music Conservatory, Vasily Ilyich Safonov. Kislovodsk is a spa town in the region of Stavropol in the north of the Caucasus. (Coincidentally, Kislovodsk was also the birthplace of another critic of Communism, Alexander Solzhenitsyn.) At the end of the 19th century and at the beginning of the 20th century, Kislovodsk welcomed many artists, musicians and members of the Russian nobility.

== Education ==
In 1906, the Safonov family moved to St. Petersburg, where Anna studied and graduated from the school of Princess Anna Obolensky, learned drawing and painting with Zeidenberg, and also became fluent in French and German. In 1911, she married a Naval officer, Sergey Timiryov (Сергей Тимирев, 1875–1932). In 1914, she gave birth to a son, named Vladimir.

== Affair ==
In 1915, she was introduced to Rear Admiral Alexander Kolchak. Although Kolchak was her husband's closest friend and commanding officer, and had a family of his own, they began a clandestine affair. In 1917, Timiryova left her husband for Kolchak.

== Russian Civil War ==
In years 1918–1919, Timiryova worked as a translator for the Department of Business Service at the Council of Ministers - an agency within Kolchak's anti-communist government in Siberia.

After Kolchak was handed over to Bolsheviks, Timiryova approached them and declared: "Arrest me. I cannot live without him." As a result, she was imprisoned in Irkutsk but was released after Kolchak's execution in February 1920. This, however, was only the beginning of a long string of her arrests, prison and labour camp sentences, and years of internal exile.

== Imprisonment and Stalin era ==
After Kolchak's death, Timiryova was released as part of an amnesty. In June 1920, however, she was arrested again and sent to a forced labor camp in Omsk. After being released from the camp, Timiryova appealed to the local authorities for permission to join her first husband in Harbin. Her request was denied and she received an additional year of imprisonment instead. The third imprisonment followed in 1922, the fourth one – in 1925. Official charges read "accused of undesirable connections with foreigners and former White officers." She was sentenced to 3 more years in prison.

After she was released, Timiryova married a railway engineer Vladimir Kniper. But her sufferings continued. In the spring of 1935, she was arrested again for "concealment of the past", and sent to a labor camp again. Later, this sentence was changed to exile in Vyshny Volochek and Maloyaroslavets. There she earned her living by sewing, knitting and sweeping the streets. In 1938, however, she was arrested for the sixth time.

She was released only after the end of the Second World War. She had no close family members left: her 24 year-old son, the artist Vladimir Timirev, had been shot on 17 May 1938. Her husband Vladimir Kniper died from a heart attack in 1942. She was still not allowed to live in Moscow, and she moved to Scherbakov (present Rybinsk) in Yaroslavskaya Oblast, where she was offered the position of a property manager at a local drama theatre.

At the very same time as Timiryova lived in Rybinsk, Admiral Kolchak's niece, Olga, was also living there. Several times Timiryova made attempts to meet with Olga, but Olga refused. According to one account, she did not want to meet the woman who "destroyed her uncle's family". According to another, Olga was afraid of the secret police.

At the end of 1949, Timiryova was imprisoned for the seventh time, this time for nine months in Yaroslavl, and as a deported convict she was sent to Yeniseisk. Timiryova was said to have been denounced by her coworkers (the actors at the drama theatre), who allegedly accused her of spreading anti-Soviet propaganda.

== "Khrushchev thaw" ==
After Timiryova was released, she returned to the Rybinsk drama theatre. She was in her 70s, but she continued working.

Timiryova could turn her hand to anything. She was a woman of considerable talent; when she was young, she drew and painted in private studio, and while in exile, she worked as toy-painting instructor and graphic designer.

She made beautifully carved gilded frames from paste impregnated papers covered with painter's gold. The frames looked as if they were real. At a theatre performance, there was a huge vase on the stage. In the footlights it shone as a diamond. Theatre veterans said that she made the vase from wire and pieces of cans.

Often, during the performance, Timiryova sat among the audience to note how everything looked on the stage.

Sometimes she even took part in performance, playing small parts, such as Princess Myagkaya in Anna Karenina. In her letters to the loved ones she admitted "I don't like the stage and I'm bored in make-up room. I feel as a property manager, not as an actress, but it seems to me that I'm not out of the picture (it does no honour to the performing style) Please bring me a box of make-up, I can't find it here and I don't like to beg somebody for it."

Contemporaries often noticed that, every time when the director, a respectable man of noble birth, saw Timiryova, he kissed her hand.

"I'm 65 and I'm in exile. Everything that happened 35 years ago is gone down in history. I have no idea who and why want that the last days of my life passed in such unbearable conditions. I ask you to put an end to it, do away with it and let me breathe and live that time which is left for me," she wrote to Premier Georgy Malenkov in 1954. But she was rehabilitated only in 1960.

She was then granted a small room in a communal flat on Pluschikha Street, Moscow.

After long efforts, Shostakovich and Oistrakh obtained a small pension for her (45 rubles) thanks to her father's services as a composer. Timiryova appeared in a crowd scene of Gaidai's 'Diamond hand' playing the part of charwoman and in Sergei Bondarchuk's War and Peace, playing the part of noble old lady at Natasha Rostova's first ball. She died in Moscow on 31 January 1975.

== Poet ==
In the years following the execution of her beloved, Timiryova composed many poems dedicated to his memory.

== In popular culture ==
Timiryova was depicted onscreen by Veronica Izotova in the 1993 miniseries The White Horse and by Elizaveta Boyarskaya in the 2008 film The Admiral.

Veronica Izotova recalled,

I put on a red make-up using a brick. My face was dirty, my sad eyes, my clothes torn, and I have to walk many hours... I wanted to play the Snow Queen. I was always more expressive and more sensitive than the average of my compatriots.

Elizaveta Boyarskaya commented,

She was a woman of such force, of such will, with such magnanimity... I feel an amazing resemblance to her... When I read script, I was even a bit scared: because she has the same vision of history as me. All that it can arrive at is me. And when I played Anna, I did not play, I was her. It was my epoch, my attitude regarding love.

After being asked about Doctor Zhivago, she said,

The only thing that these two films share consists in the love which the Russian women can carry; it is a topic approached by many novels. They love up to the last drop of blood, till the most dreadful end, to the death; they are capable of leaving family and children for the love of the man which they have chosen.

== Music ==
The main original song for the film Admiral is called Anna. She is interpreted by the Russian singer Viktoria Dayneko. The music of the song was composed by Igor Matvienko and the words were written by Timiryova in memory of her lover, Admiral Kolchak.
