= About Vitya, Masha, and Marines =

- Russian: Про Витю, про Машу и морскую пехоту
- Directed by: Mikhail Ptashuk
- Written by: Anatoly Usov
- Starring: Sergei Svetlitsky; Oksana Bobrovich; Ivan Mykolaichuk; Aleksandr Abdulov; Tynchylyk Razzakov
- Cinematography: Yuriy Klimenko
- Edited by: Valentina Oleynik
- Music by: Vladislav Kazenin
- Release date: 1973
- Running time: 65 minute
- Country: Soviet Union
- Language: Russian

About Vitya, Masha, and Marines (Russian: Про Витю, про Машу и морскую пехоту) is a 1973 Soviet adventure film directed by Mikhail Ptashuk.

== Plot ==
Six-year-old Vitya lives on a military base, where his father is an officer and his mother a military doctor. Before sending him to school, his parents decide he should spend the summer at a pioneer camp to learn how to live among peers and adjust to new school routines. However, Vitya, accustomed to life on the base and the camaraderie of military life, surprises everyone. Though initially seen as a "little kid" by the others, he quickly becomes the most serious member of his group, teaching his fellow campers discipline, resilience, and compassion.

== Cast ==
- Sergei Svetlitsky as Vitya Kryakin (as Seryozha Svetlitskiy)
- Oksana Bobrovich as Masha Petrova
- Ivan Mykolaichuk as Vakula
- Aleksandr Abdulov as Kozlov
- Tynchylyk Razzakov as Sadyk (as Radzh Razzakov)
- Georgiy Pipya as Giya (as Giga Pipiya)
- Galina Sulima as Yelizaveta Vasilyevna (as Galina Shchevibolk)
- Stanislav Franio as Stas Bokov (as Stasik Franio)
- Zhenya Bliznyuk as Miron
- Edik Orlov as Zhora
