= Igor Lifanov =

Russian actor

- Игорь Лифанов
- Born: 25 December 1965 (age 60); Mykolaiv, Ukrainian SSR, Soviet Union
- Citizenship: Soviet Union; Russian
- Occupation: Actor
- Years active: 1991–present
- Spouses: Elena Pavlikova (divorced); Tatyana Aptikeeva (divorced); Elena Kosenko (m. 2011)
- Children: 2

Igor Romanovich Lifanov (Russian: Игорь Романович Лифанов; born 25 December 1965) is a Russian actor of theater, cinema and TV.

== Biography ==
Igor Lifanov born 25 December 1965, in the Ukrainian Soviet Socialist Republic, in the city of Nikolayev.

He lived in the city of Mykolaiv, where he graduated from school, then served in the Navy in the Far East.

He entered the Saint Petersburg State Theatre Arts Academy, from which he graduated in 1992, diploma work An Ardent Heart, after which he was invited to Tovstonogov Bolshoi Drama Theater. In 2003, he left the theater.

== Personal life ==
His first marriage with Elena Pavlikova was at the institute and ended after 3 months. A second marriage to actress Tatyana Aptikeeva lasted 13 years, but also ended in divorce. That marriage produced a daughter, Anastasia. He married Elena Kosenko in September 2011, after being in a relationship for 9 years. They have a daughter.

== Filmography ==
- 1991: Labeled as underground man
- 1997: Brother as bandit on the kitchen
- 1998: Streets of Broken Lights (TV Series) as Slavin
- 1999-2000: National Security Agent 1-2 (TV Series) as Sasha Lufar
- 2000: Deadly Force (TV Series) as Anokhin
- 2001: The Romanovs: An Imperial Family (TV Series) as Sergey Mstislavsky
- 2002: Letters to Elsa as Aleksei
- 2002: Spetsnaz (TV Mini-Series) as Khrustalyov
- 2003: District (TV Series) as felon
- 2004: Huntsman as Vasily Klintsov
- 2004: Night Watch (2004) as Parrot (uncredited)
- 2005: The Last Battle of Major Pugachev as Pugachev
- 2006: Hunting for Red Deer as Kalyagin
- 2006: Day Watch as Parrot
- 2006: Fucked up as Valentin
- 2006: Break-through as Capt. Fyodor Stozharov
- 2006: Paradise as Nikolay Zvyagin
- 2007: Full Breath as Stepan
- 2007: The Guide as Pavel Shnyrev
- 2009: Trap for the Killer as Alexander Melnikov
- 2009: The Taming of the Shrew as Mikhalych
- 2009: Attack on Leningrad as Gorkin
- 2009: Wild as captain Alexander Dichenko
- 2009: True Love as Vasily
- 2010: Justice Wolves as Young Investigator
- 2012: Nowhere Man (Short) as Sergey Kutepov
- 2014: Dangerous Love as Ivan Zolotaryov
- 2014: Bull and Spindle as Bull
- 2017: Fizruk as Gena
- 2020: Something for Nothing (Short) as Ray Hicks
