= Werewolf Hour =

- Directed by: Igor Shevchenko
- Written by: Sergey Chetvertkov; Vadim Ermolin
- Starring: Mikhail Pakhomenko; Aleksandr Baluev; Marina Starykh
- Cinematography: Aleksandr Lobeev
- Music by: Artemiy Artemiev
- Production company: Tonis
- Release date: June 1990
- Running time: 87 min.
- Country: Soviet Union
- Language: Russian

Werewolf Hour (Russian: Час оборотня, romanized: Chas oborotnya) is a 1990 Soviet horror film directed by Igor Shevchenko.

The film was considered lost for over 30 years.

== Plot ==
50 year old journalist Kovalev finally gets the chance to become the editor-in-chief of the newspaper. Not wanting to tempt fate, the hero turns to the party organizer for support. And then something unexpected happens, Kovalev's ankle is bitten by a dog, and he becomes a werewolf. Turning into a terrible dog at night, Kovalev has been prowling the city ever since and instilling fear in his readers. Policeman Vasily, the son of an unfortunate journalist, is entrusted to find and neutralize the beast.

== Cast ==
- Mikhail Pakhomenko as Grigory Maksimovich Kovalev
- Aleksandr Baluev as Vasily Kovalev
- Marina Starykh as Taya
- Sergey Bystritsky as Gena
- Larisa Borodina as Claudia

== Critical response ==
According to a columnist for Darker Magazine, Shevchenko's film is distinguished by a gloomy atmosphere and an unsettling soundtrack in the spirit of Dario Argento's Suspiria, as well as sexual scenes unusual for Soviet cinema and special effects of the main character's transformation.

Film critic Alexander Shpagin wrote in the Iskusstvo Kino in 1992: Werewolf Hour a typical example of Russian horror. An almost documentary recreated environment of a small provincial town, where life seems to be like life. But little by little, you are seized by a state of anxiety, woven from a disintegrated way of life, general anger, total uselessness. As a result, the hero turns into an ominous werewolf dog, as if sublimating with this gesture all the vileness of life here.
