= Knyaz Andrey =

- Genre: Historical drama
- Written by: Timur Ezugbaya; Ali Uzdenov
- Directed by: David Tkebuchava
- Starring: Aleksandr Golubev; Aleksandr Baluev; Aleksandr Ustyugov; Sergey Bezrukov; Aglaya Shilovskaya; Dmitry Blokhin; Sergey Sotserdotsky
- Composers: Theodor Bastard; Vadim Maevskiy; Aleksandr Turkunov
- No. of seasons: 1
- No. of episodes: 8

Production
- Producers: Irina Bark; Tatyana Smirnova; Maria Ushakova; Ekaterina Zhukova; Anton Zlatopolskiy
- Cinematography: Maksim Shinkorenko

Original release
- Network: Russia-1
- Release: 16 March 2026

Knyaz Andrey (Russian: Князь Андрей) is a 2026 Russian historical drama television series directed by David Tkebuchava. It stars Aleksandr Golubev.

== Plot ==
The series takes place in the 12th century in Ancient Rus'. It tells the story of the young prince Andrey Bogolyubsky, who returns to his homeland from Byzantium. He dreams of ruling the Suzdal land and transforming it into a new prosperous center. But his father, Yuri Dolgoruky, views him as merely a facilitator of his own desires. Consequently, Andrei decides to declare himself an independent ruler.

== Cast ==
- Aleksandr Golubev as Andrey Bogolyubsky
- Aleksandr Baluev as Yuri Dolgorukiy
- Aleksandr Ustyugov as Anbal Yasin
- Sergey Bezrukov as Kuchko
- Aglaya Shilovskaya as Ulita
- Dmitry Blokhin as Kuzma
- Sergey Sotserdotsky as Naydyon
