= Aleksandr Baluev =

Soviet and Russian theatre and film actor

- Александр Балуев
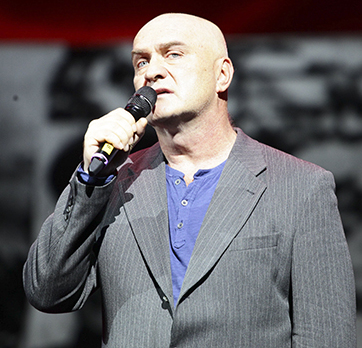
- Speech by Aleksandr Baluev at the St. Petersburg Suvorov Military School
- Born: Aleksandr Nikolaevich Baluev; 6 December 1958 (age 67); Moscow, Russian SFSR, Soviet Union
- Citizenship: Soviet Union; Russia
- Occupation: Actor
- Years active: 1980–present
- Awards: Nika Award (1995)
- Website: baluev.tv

Aleksandr Nikolaevich Baluev (Russian: Алекса́ндр Никола́евич Балу́ев; born 6 December 1958) is a Soviet and Russian theatre and film actor who has appeared in more than 100 films and numerous stage productions since 1980.

== Life and career ==
Aleksandr Baluev was born in Moscow, Russian SFSR, Soviet Union. He graduated in 1975 from Moscow School No. 637. After unsuccessful attempts to enter the Boris Shchukin Theatre Institute he worked for a year as assistant illuminator in the light department at Mosfilm. The second attempt was successful, with Aleksandr entering the Moscow Art Theatre School on Pavel Massalsky's course. In 1980, he successfully completed the training and became an actor of the Soviet Army Theatre. The first role in his theatrical career was playing in productions of Clock Without Hands and Lady of the Camellias.

In 1986, Aleksandr Baluev went to the Moscow Yermolova Theatre, playing leading roles in productions of The Second Year of Freedom, Snow Near the Prison, and Caligula.

In the late 1980s, Aleksandr Baluev left the theater. He is now active in the enterprise and collaborates with the Lenkom Theatre.

== Family ==
In 2003, he married a Polish citizen, journalist Maria Urbanowska, after dating for 10 years. Their daughter Maria Anna was born the same year. In 2013, they divorced.

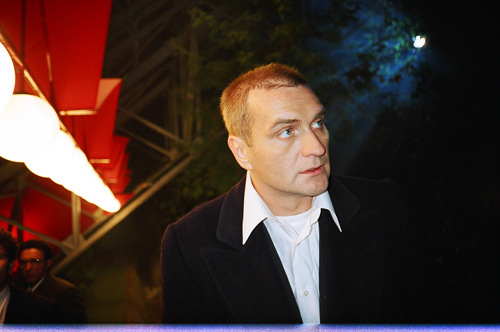
Baluev on the set of Moscow (2000).

== Selected filmography ==
Film
Year	Title	Role	Notes
2023	The Challenge	General manager at the Roscosmos Space Center	
2020	On the Moon	old man	
2016	The Heritage of Love	Mikhail Tereshchenko	
2015	The Warrior	Kulikov	
2015	Two Women	Arkady Islaev	
2011	The Best Movie 3	Viktor Pavlovich	
2010	Kandagar	Vladimir Ivanovich Sharpatov	
2007	The Banishment	Mark, Alex's brother	
2007	1612	Osina, ataman	
2005	The Turkish Gambit	General Sobolev	
2003	Bless the Woman	Alexander Larichev, a career officer	
2003	The Forced March		
2002	Tycoon	Koretsky, FSB general	
2002	Antikiller	Shaman, crime boss	
2001	The Turn of the Century	Markus, German journalist	
2001	In August of 1944	Mishchenko	
2001	Holiday	Yelisey	
2000	Proof of Life	Russian Colonel	Hollywood production
1998	Deep Impact	Mikhail Tulchinsky	Hollywood production
1997	The Peacemaker	General Aleksander Kodoroff	Hollywood production
1995	A Moslem	Brother	
1990	Werewolf Hour	Vasily Kovalev	

Television
Year	Title	Role	Notes
2026	Knyaz Andrey	Yuri Dolgorukiy	
2016	Sophia	Stephen the Great	TV mini-series
2014	Catherine	Narrator	Voice; TV series
2012	Zhukov	Marshal Georgy Zhukov	TV series
2011	Peter the Great: The Testament	Peter the Great	TV mini-series
2005	The Fall of the Empire	Sergey Kostin, counterintelligence	TV mini-series
2004	Moscow Saga	Nikita Gradov	TV series
2002	Spetsnaz	Major Platov, the hardened veteran unit commander	TV mini-series
1993	The White Horse	Panchkin	TV mini-series

== Awards and nominations ==
Year	Award	Category	Nominated work	Result	Ref.
1995	Kinotavr Film Festival	Best Actor	A Moslem	Won	
1996	Nika Award	Best Supporting Actor or Actress	A Moslem	Won	
2007	Golden Eagle Award	Best Actor	La traductrice	Nominated	
2008	Nika Award	Best Supporting Actor	The Banishment	Nominated	
2011	Golden Eagle Award	Best Actor	Kandagar	Nominated	
2013	APKiT Awards	Best Actor in a TV Movie/Series	Zhukov	Nominated	
2013	Golden Eagle Award	Best Actor on Television	Zhukov	Nominated	
2014	Golden Eagle Award	Best Actor on Television	Life and Fate	Nominated	
