= Spetsnaz (miniseries) =

Russian television series

- Genre: Action-adventure; Drama; Military drama
- Developed by: Andrei Malyukov
- Starring: Aleksandr Baluyev; Aleksei Kravchenko; Vladislav Galkin; Igor Lifanov; Vladimir Turchinsky; Aleksandr Nosik; Andrei Zibrov
- Country of origin: Russia
- Original language: Russian
- No. of seasons: 2
- No. of episodes: 7

Production
- Production location: Moscow
- Production company: Svarog

Original release
- Network: ORT
- Release: March 25, 2002 – October 14, 2003

Spetsnaz (Russian: Спецназ) is a 2002 Russian TV miniseries directed by Andrei Malyukov.

== Overview ==
The series is set mostly in Russia and follows the adventures of four (initially six) members of the Spetsnaz. The locations also switch frequently and have also included Chechnya, Afghanistan, Dagestan, and Kosovo.

Through the course of the series, the characters have done everything from rescuing shot-down pilots in Chechnya to rescuing the passengers and crew of a hijacked Aeroflot plane grounded in Afghanistan.

== Cast ==
The following are recurring characters in the show

- Aleksandr Baluyev as Major 'Klim' Platov, the hardened veteran unit commander
- Aleksei Kravchenko as Captain 'Doc' Vyazemsky
- Vladislav Galkin as Senior Lieutenant 'Yakut' Urmanov
- Igor Lifanov as Senior Warrant Officer 'Khrust' Khrustalyov
- Vladimir Turchinsky as Lt. Col. Ozornykh
- Aleksandr Nosik as Senior Warrant Officer 'Zmey' Kobrin
- Andrei Zibrov as Warrant Officer Aleksey 'Shakh' Shakhmametyev

== Ban ==
In October 2014 the Ukrainian State Film Agency banned some Russian films, particularly Spetsnaz, for demonstration and distribution. According to the head of the agency Pylyp Illenko, that decision was caused by events in Ukraine which has made it "improper to show Russian films with obvious propaganda, for example, exaltation of Russian law enforcement and Russia itself, on Ukrainian TV channels now."
