= Sergey Drobotenko =

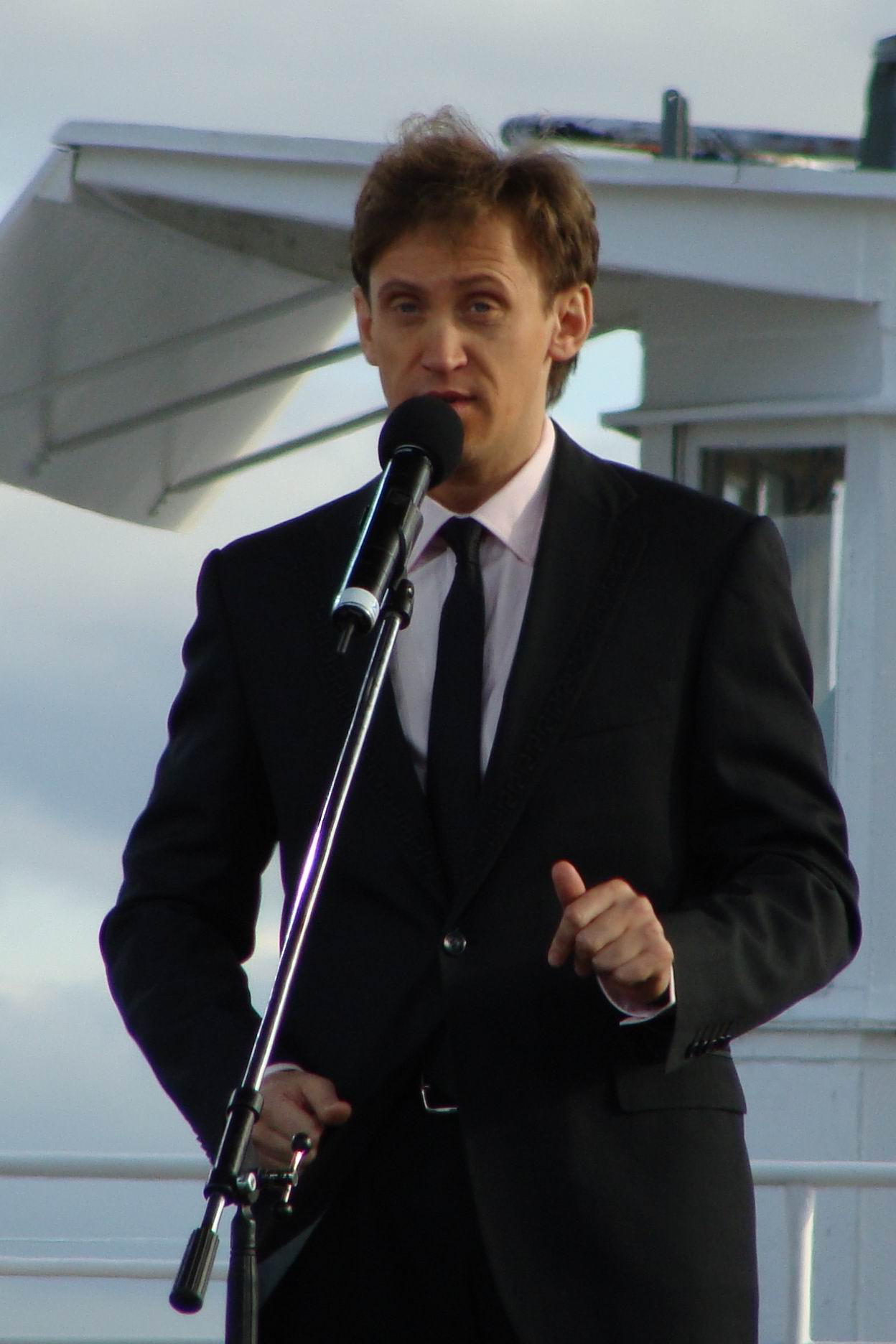

Sergey Anatolyevich Drobotenko (Russian: Сергей Анатольевич Дроботенко; born 14 September 1969 in Dnipropetrovsk) is a Russian humorist.

== Biography ==
Drobotenko was born on 14 September 1969 in Dnipropetrovsk, Ukrainian SSR. At the age of three he moved with his parents to Omsk. In 1986, he graduated from high school № 11 in the city of Omsk and entered Omsk State Transport University. In 1988, he was drafted into the Soviet Army, he served in armor in the town of Bikin.

In 1992, he graduated from the Omsk Institute of Railway Engineers. In parallel, he graduated from the school of acting studio in actor. After the distribution of teaching electrical engineering at the railway lyceum the city of Omsk. In late 1993, he was adopted by a DJ on the radio Europa Plus in Omsk. In the same year Sergey Anatolyevich organizes theater pop miniatures.

In 1998, he moved from Omsk to Moscow, will debut at capital stage. Later becoming a screenwriter on the channel TV Tsentr.

In 1999, he became the winner of the (third) of the International competition of satire and humor of artists in Moscow. In 2005, the two spent a benefit evening And laughter, and sin in the concert hall Russia. Since 2005 — participant and presenter of the festival of satire and humor in Jurmala.

Sergey Drobotenko is not married and has no children.
