= Vladimir Bogomolov (writer) =

Russian-Soviet writer

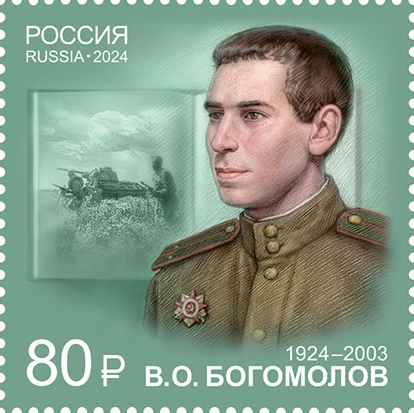
Bogomolov on a 2024 stamp of Russia

Vladimir Osipovich Bogomolov (Russian: Влади́мир О́сипович Богомо́лов; 3 July 1924 in Kirillovka village, Moscow Governorate – 30 December 2003 in Moscow) was a Soviet and Russian writer.

When Bogomolov was still in school the Soviet Union was drawn into World War II. He joined the Army after completing only seven grades. He started the war as a private; when the war was over, he had a company under his command. He was wounded and was awarded several medals during his active duty. He continued his military service until 1950 in the army intelligence in East Germany. In 1950 — 1951, he spent 13 months in jail without being formally charged. He retired in 1952. One of his early short stories, Ivan (Иван, 1957), was adapted to the screen as Ivan's Childhood (Иваново детство, 1962) by Andrei Tarkovsky.

His most famous novel is In August of 1944 (The Moment of Truth, 1973), which tells the story of SMERSH operatives that followed the frontlines, restored order, and eliminated suspected marauders and saboteurs. It is partly told through pseudo-authentic military correspondence and documents: orders, circulars, telegrams, and reports. The novel saw over a hundred editions, was translated into multiple languages, and was made into a film twice.
