= Omsk State Transport University =

University in Omsk, Russia

Coordinates: 54.9694°N 73.3847°E

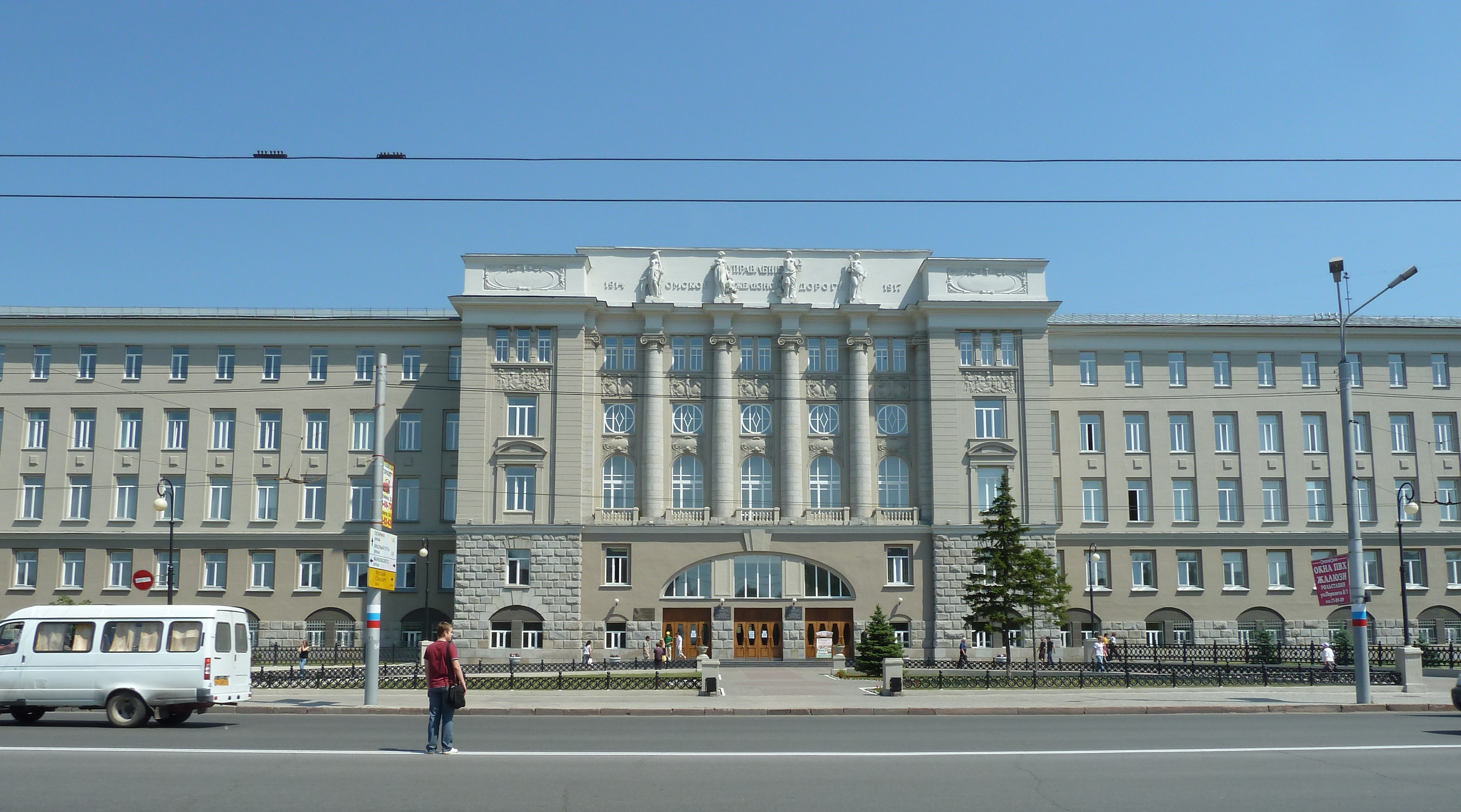
Main building of the university

Omsk State Transport University (Russian: Омский государственный университет путей сообщения) is a university in Omsk, Russia. It was established in 1961.

== History ==
In April 1896, the State Council of the Russian Empire decided to establish the Tomsk Technological Institute (TTI). On October 9, 1900, the TTI began training mechanics and construction engineers. A new school was established in July 1930 in Tomsk from two faculties of Tomsk Polytechnic University as the Siberian Institute of Transport Engineers (SIIT). In 1932, the Novosibirsk Institute of Railway Engineers was created from the track-building faculty, and the SIIT itself was transformed into the Tomsk Electromechanical Institute of Transport Engineers (TEMIIT). In 1961, it was transferred to Omsk and renamed Omsk Institute of Railway Engineers (OmIIT). In 1994, the institute was transformed into an academy and in 1997 gained the status of university.

== Structure ==
=== Faculties and Institutes ===
- Institute of Land Transport Systems
- Institute of Automation, Telecommunications and Information Technologies
- Institute of Electric Transport and Power Supply Systems (IETSE)
- Institute of Management and Economics (CPMM)
- Institute for Advanced Studies and Retraining
- Faculty of Pre-university Training and Vocational Guidance

=== Branches ===
- Taiga Institute of Railway Transport
- Omsk Technical School of Railway Transport
- Omsk Medical School of Railway Transport

== Alumni ==
- Karl Vaino, former First Secretary of the Communist Party of Estonia
- Sergey Drobotenko, humorist
- Sergey Kalinin, ice hockey player
- Aleksei Müürisepp, Chairman of the Supreme Soviet of the Estonian SSR from 1961 to 1970.
