= Vasily Safonov =

Russian pianist, teacher, conductor and composer

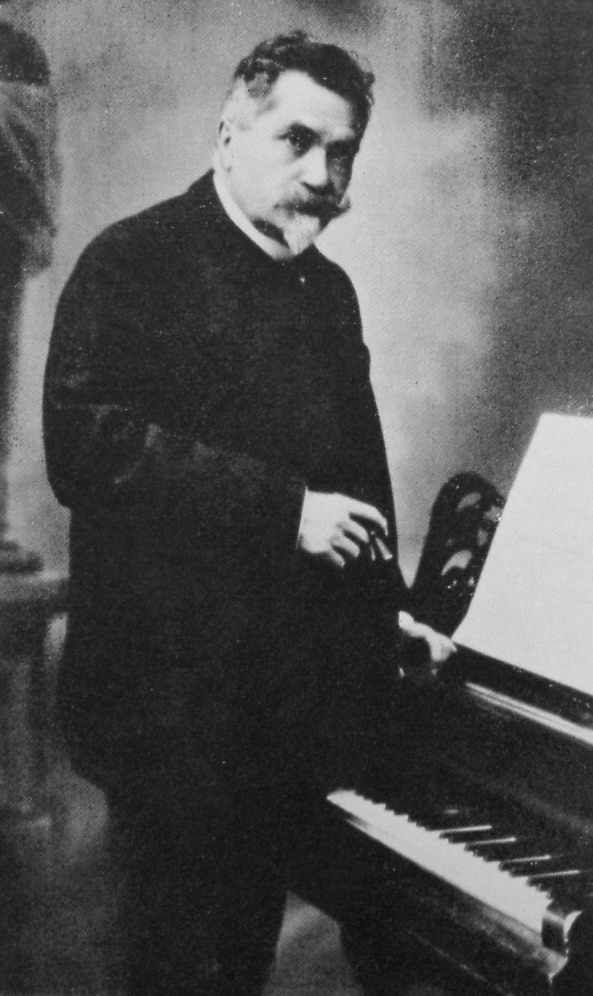
Vasily Safonov (1902)

Vasily Ilyich Safonov (Russian: Василий Ильич Сафонов; 25 January [O.S. 13 January] 1852 – 27 February 1918), also known as Wassily Safonoff, was a Russian pianist, teacher, conductor and composer.

== Biography ==
Vasily Safonov, also known as Safonoff in the West during his lifetime, was born in Ishcherskaya (also rendered as Itschory, Itsyursk, or Itsiursk) in the Russian Caucasus (present-day Chechnya), the son of Cossack General Ilya Ivanovich Safonov.

He studied at the Imperial Alexandra Lyceum in Saint Petersburg and later at the Saint Petersburg Conservatory from 1881 to 1885 under Louis Brassin. He graduated with a Bachelor of Laws and received the conservatory's gold medal in piano performance. He also studied under Theodor Leschetizky and Nikolai Zaremba.

Safonov had three daughters who pursued artistic careers. Anna Vasilyevna Timiryova (1893–1975) became a poet and later spent many years in labor camps and exile. Varvara Vasilievna Safonova (1895–1942), a painter, died during the Siege of Leningrad. Yelena Vasilievna Safonova (1902–1980) studied painting, designed theatre costumes, and published children's books; she lived in exile in Kursk from 1932 to 1958.

Safonov was best known for his work in music education. He became director of the Moscow Conservatory in 1889 and later served as director of the National Conservatory of Music in New York from 1906 to 1909.

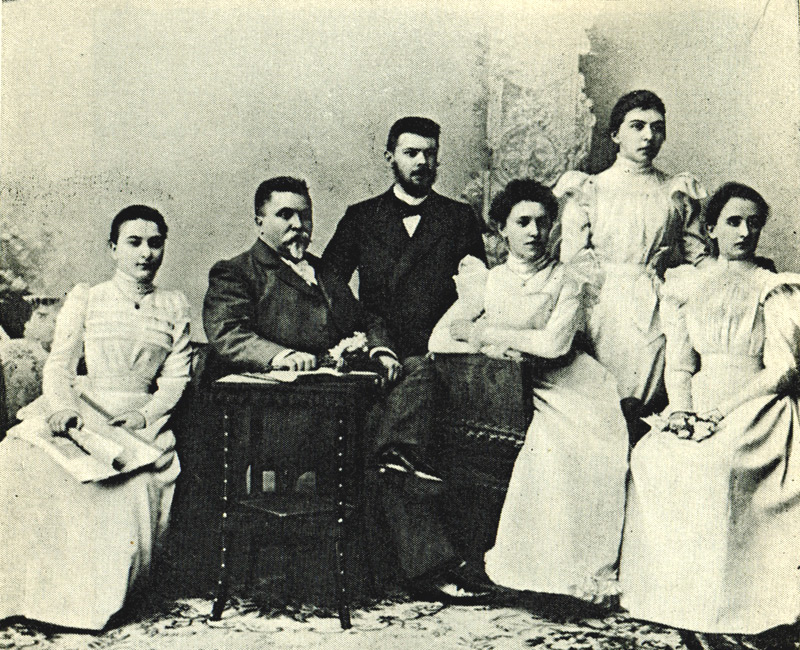
Safonov with his pupils from the Moscow Conservatory (left to right): Rosina Lhévinne, Alexander Goedicke, Elena Beckman-Shcherbina, Olimpiada Kartasheva and Aglaida Fridman

Among his students were several of Russia's most prominent pianists, including Alexander Scriabin, Nikolai Medtner, Josef Lhévinne and Rosina Bessie (later Lhévinne). He also taught the theorist and pedagogue Maria Levinskaya as well as Marthe Servine, a French-American composer and pianist. See also: List of music students by teacher

After retiring from teaching, Safonov achieved recognition as a conductor. He conducted the first Moscow performance of Tchaikovsky's Pathétique Symphony (No. 6) on 4/16 December 1893, seven weeks after its premiere under the composer's direction and six weeks after his death.

Safonov conducted many of Europe's leading orchestras, including the Berlin Philharmonic, Vienna Philharmonic, Prague Philharmonic, the Lamoureux Orchestra of Paris, the London Symphony Orchestra, the Orchestra dell'Accademia Nazionale di Santa Cecilia, and the New York Philharmonic.

He is regarded as the first modern conductor known to have dispensed with the use of the baton. According to reports, this practice began when he once forgot to bring his baton to a rehearsal and conducted with his hands; he subsequently considered the baton unnecessary.

Safonov died in Kislovodsk on 27 February 1918, at the age of 66.

== His voice ==
Safonov's voice
Recorded January 1890

Anton Rubinstein:	What a wonderful thing.	Какая прекрасная вещь ....хорошо... (in Russian)	Kakaya prekrasnaya veshch' ....khorosho...
Julius Block:	At last.	Наконец-то.	Nakonets-to.
Yelizaveta Lavrovskaya:	You're disgusting. How dare you call me crafty?	Противный *** да как вы смеете называть меня коварной?	Protivnyy *** da kak vy smeyete nazyvat' menya kovarnoy?
Vasily Safonov:	(sings)
Pyotr Tchaikovsky:	This trill could be better.	Эта трель могла бы быть и лучше.	Eta trel' mogla by byt' i luchshe.
Lavrovskaya:	(sings)
Tchaikovsky:	Block is a good fellow, but Edison is even better.	Блок молодец, но у Эдисона ещё лучше!	Blok molodets, no u Edisona yeshchyo luchshe!
Lavrovskaya:	(sings) A-o, a-o.	А-о, а-о.	A-o, a-o.
Safonov:	Peter Jurgenson in Moscow.	Peter Jurgenson in Moskau. (in German)	Peter Jurgenson in Moskau.
Tchaikovsky:	Who's speaking now? It seems like Safonov's voice.	Кто сейчас говорит? Кажется голос Сафонова.	Kto seychas govorit? Kazhetsya golos Safonova.
Safonov:	(whistles)
