= Holiday (2001 film) =

- Russian: Праздник
- Directed by: Garik Sukachov
- Written by: Ivan Okhlobystin; Garik Sukachov
- Produced by: Vladimir Grammatikov; Vladimir Repnikov; Garik Sukachov
- Starring: Masha Oamer; Aleksandr Baluyev; Kseniya Kachalina; Sasha Korolyov; Sergey Batalov
- Cinematography: Aleksey Sechenov
- Edited by: Yelena Semyonovykh
- Music by: Pyotr Todorovsky
- Release date: 2001
- Country: Russia
- Language: Russian

Holiday (Russian: Праздник) is a 2001 Russian war romance film directed by Garik Sukachov.

== Plot ==
The film takes place on June 22, 1941 in one village, which celebrates the birthday of one girl. No one even suspected that in a few hours the war would begin.

== Cast ==
- Masha Oamer as Nastya
- Aleksandr Baluyev as Yelisey
- Kseniya Kachalina as Country Teacher
- Sasha Korolyov as Genka
- Sergey Batalov as Uncle Sasha
- Olga Blok-Mirimskaya as Aunt Tamara
- Mikhail Efremov as Dzyuba
- Nikolai Pastukhov as Semyon Ivanovich
- Vadim Aleksandrov as Grandpa Kolya
- Viktor Bortsov
