= Mikhail Ptashuk =

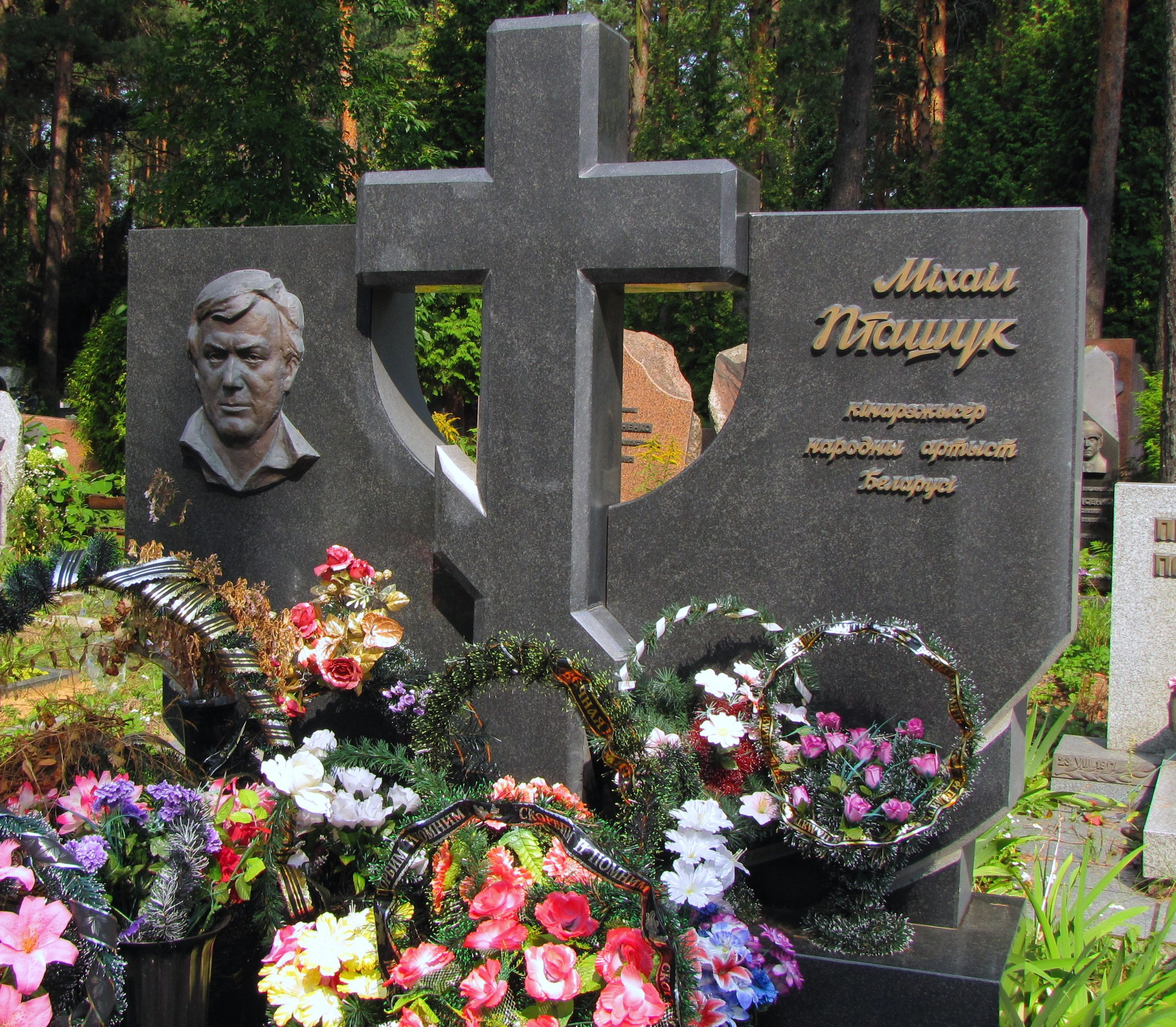
- Born: Mikhail Nikolaevich Ptashuk; January 28, 1943; Soviet Union (now Belarus)
- Died: 26 April 2002 (aged 59); Russia
- Citizenship: BelarusRussian Federation
- Occupation(s): film director, screenwriter
- Spouse: Lilia Ptashuk

Mikhail Nikolaevich Ptashuk (Russian: Михаил Николаевич Пташу́к, Belarusian: Міхаі́л Мікала́евіч Пташу́к); January 28, 1943 – April 26, 2002 was a Soviet and Belarusian film director and screenwriter.

== Filmography ==
=== As director ===
- About Vitya, Masha, and Marines (1973)
- Forest Swing (1975)
- Time Has Chosen Us (1976)
- I'll Take Your Pain (1980)
- Black Castle Olshansky (1984)
- Sign of Disaster (1987)
- Our Armoured Train (1989)
- Co-op Politburo, or Will Long Farewell (1992)
- Game of Imagination (1995)
- In August of 1944 (2001)
- The Song of Rose (2003)

=== As screenwriter ===
- The Song of Rose (2003)
- Colour of Love (2005)
