= Vladimir Turchinsky =

Russian wrestler, strongman and actor

Personal information
- Nickname: Dynamite
- Born: Vladimir Yevgenyevich Turchinsky; 28 September 1963 Moscow, Russian SFSR, Soviet Union
- Died: 16 December 2009 (aged 46) Pashukovo, Moscow Oblast, Russia
- Education: Russian State University of Physical Education, Sport, Youth and Tourism
- Spouse: Larisa Turchinskaya (2nd wife)
- Children: 2
Medal record
Strongman
Representing Russia
World's Strongest Man
Qualified	1996 World's Strongest Man
Qualified	1998 World's Strongest Man
Russia's Strongest Man
1st	1998 Russia's Strongest Man

Vladimir Yevgenyevich Turchinsky (Russian: Влади́мир Евге́ньевич Турчи́нский; 28 September 1963 – 16 December 2009) was a Russian wrestler, strongman, television and radio presenter, actor, author, singer and businessman. After completing military service he took various odd jobs, as a photographer, bodyguard, security officer, circus performer, and translator from English and French. He later became a notable media personality capitalizing on his massive physique and a strongman image.

Turchinsky was a Master of Sports in sambo and judo. He internationally played American football, and competed in the International Gladiators 1 series under the stage name Dynamite. He held the following Guinness World Records: pulling an Antonov An-124 Ruslan, and moving a 20-ton truck over 100 meters.

== Films ==
- Spetsnaz (2002) – Colonel Vladimir Ozornyh
- Yeralash (2006) – "Terminator"
- Fitil (2006)
- Happy Together (2006) – cameo
- The Best Movie (2008) – arms dealer
- Svaty (2008) – cameo
- Russian Transporter (2008) — Solodov
- Daddy's Daughters (2009) – bodybuilding coach

== Books ==
- Владимир Турчинский (2006). Взрывная философия. AST. ISBN 9785170402021.
