= Combination company =

Touring theater company which performed only one play

A combination company was a touring theater company which performed only one play. Unlike repertory companies, which performed multiple plays in rotation, combination companies used more elaborate and specialized scenery in their productions.

== Overview ==
Repertory theatre had been popular in the United States through the 19th century, and it is not clear how the combination system originated. Combination companies contributed to the early success of Broadway theatre, as most combination companies began their tours in New York City. Combination companies were fueled by stars. The Star agenda or star system that had been set in place in mid 19th century America helped greatly in the development of the combination company. The idea of celebrity was at full force and people would flock to theater houses to see their favorite stars perform. Stars made famous in New York would travel to stock theaters and perform limited engagements there. "The engagements of the first important stars ... were rare and special events". Audiences would come in from all over to sold out performances at playhouses and see their favorite stars.

The stock companies would cancel their normal repertory programs for a few nights to allow for the show of the star. The star would be supported by the local company of actors in the play, which proved to be very frustrating to them. After the star left, the company returned to its repertory schedule as per usual. Yet annoyed by the lack of talent from regional companies, the stars began to search for companies to tour with them. They began to tour with two or three actors, and then eventually whole companies would tour with them and they would perform a repertory of plays. This switch to companies that support the stars for the whole tour was one more step in the transition from stock companies to combination companies.

== Repertory vs. combination ==
Repertory companies, both those in residence and those on tour, featured several actors who rehearsed multiple plays which were performed in rotation, adding and removing shows from their repertoire over time. Repertory theaters, also known as stock theaters, generally employed generic theatrical properties for use in each of their productions. This system was popular throughout the United States in the 19th century.

Because combination companies only performed a single play, they were not restricted by the need to use generic properties. Combination companies took advantage of this fact by specializing each asset of the company—actors, rehearsals, scenery, properties, costumes and personnel—to tailor to the needs of the one play being performed. In particular, this enabled combination companies to use more elaborate scenery than their repertory counterparts.

== Origin ==
It is not entirely clear how the combination system originated. American actress Laura Keene toured with a combination company as early as 1862. American actor Joseph Jefferson claimed that both he and Charles Wyndham independently established the combination system in 1868 with their productions of Rip van Winkle and The Lancers, respectively. The advent of the First transcontinental railroad may have contributed to the success of touring companies.

Many early touring companies found success by exclusively performing renditions of the immensely popular Uncle Tom's Cabin, an anti-slavery novel published in 1852 by Harriet Beecher Stowe. In 1927, 75 years after Uncle Tom's Cabin had been published, these renditions, known as Tom shows, were still being performed exclusively by twelve combination companies worldwide.

Most of the combination companies in the United States rehearsed and began their tours in New York City, which contributed to the early success of what would eventually be known as Broadway theatre. The combination company system was so successful throughout the United States that Dion Boucicault, an Irish actor and playwright, brought it to England for the first tour of his play The Colleen Bawn in the 1860s.

== Circuits and the syndicate ==
Another way the combination business was run was through circuits. Local managers struggled with finding a continuous flow of touring companies, because it required them to take multiple trips to New York to make deals with producers. “Booking a successful season of touring productions was a complex gamble for the theatre manager,” so the solution was to create a travel circuit. A travel circuit is when a group of the theaters all in the same state or neighboring states would band together under one theater manager, who would then go to New York to make deals with the Broadway producers. This idea was much more beneficial for the producer because it provided multiple stops of a tour all guaranteed under one business deal and made tour planning much simpler.

It was helpful to the local theater managers because it provided a steady stream of business to help keep their theater afloat and also helped them to get popular shows to travel through their city. This soon grew into managers from theaters in a large city buying out smaller theaters or making them pay interest to the larger theaters. M.B. Leavitt was the manager of a popular theater in San Francisco and is given the credit of developing “loosely organized circuits” into centralized booking agencies, which controlled the theatre in large segments of the country. He did this by adding small theaters from Omaha to San Francisco to the circuit and having them pay him to provide for the traveling expenses of the company. This brought attention to the company because they would be guaranteed sold out one-night stands in smaller towns and a sold-out long run in San Francisco This became the foundation of what became a syndicate.

Through the centralization of booking, booking agents became extremely important in negotiations between local managers and circuit representatives. These booking agencies grew in power by monopolizing all the theaters in a certain region of America, claiming that "it was more efficient for a theater or a circuit to do all its booking through one agency".

In 1896 the ultimate monopoly of the theater booking industry of traveling companies was created. It was called the Theatrical Syndicate and was formed by six booking agents who pooled together thirty-three of the top theaters from major cities around the country, which were then called Syndicate houses. If a producer played in one Syndicate house on his tour then every city he performed in, if there was a syndicate house there, he would have to perform at that house and no other theater. The Syndicate was the foremost business power in theater during the late 1800s and early 1900s and was very similar to the other "giant 'trusts' of its day". It had no competition, so it was able to choose its prices and fees that it took from the producers, managers and circuits under their control and demanded percentages of the profits of the shows. It was the height of the centralization of the theater business. The Theatrical Syndicate allowed for the business of touring shows and combination companies to be managed in one centralized place, New York City. The Syndicate began to lose power with what is called the death of the road and the rise of motion pictures.

== The death of the road ==
The death of the road started happening after 1915 due to sinking profits, increased travel expenses and lower quality touring productions. Theater began to be based in New York with no intentions of touring, because the Syndicate monopoly had been corrupted and was producing low art productions. New York became the producing center and the most important city for producing theater. The long runs were reestablished and producers now began looking for the next best play that could last multiple performances. Also the rise of motion pictures drew audiences away from touring shows, because they offered the same stars and entertainment but at a cheaper price and more diverse productions. Slowly but surely, playhouses converted back to regional theaters and combination companies became non-existent.
