= The Forced March =

- Russian: Марш-бросок
- Directed by: Nikolai Stambula
- Written by: Sergei Bratchikov; Eduard Volodarsky
- Produced by: Maksim Fedoseyev; Antonina Fedoseyeva
- Starring: Vladimir Volga; Olga Chursina; Evgeniy Kosyrev; Fyodor Smirnov; Aleksandr Baluev; Vitaliy Vashedskiy
- Cinematography: Radik Askarov
- Edited by: Tatyana Prilenskaya; Marina Vasileva
- Music by: Artemiy Artemiev
- Production company: New Century Studio
- Release date: 2003
- Country: Russia
- Language: Russian

The Forced March (Russian: Марш-бросок) is a 2003 Russian action war film directed by Nikolai Stambula.

== Plot ==
The film tells about a pupil of an orphanage who wants to go to war in Chechnya. He is undergoing training and is being included in the elite special forces. Ahead of him there will be many trials, but he will adhere to his principles to the end.

== Cast ==
- Vladimir Volga as Aleksandr
- Olga Chursina as Masha
- Evgeniy Kosyrev as Volodya
- Fyodor Smirnov as Hasan
- Aleksandr Baluev
- Vitaliy Vashedskiy
