= Vladimir Semago =

Russian politician and businessman

- Владимир Семаго
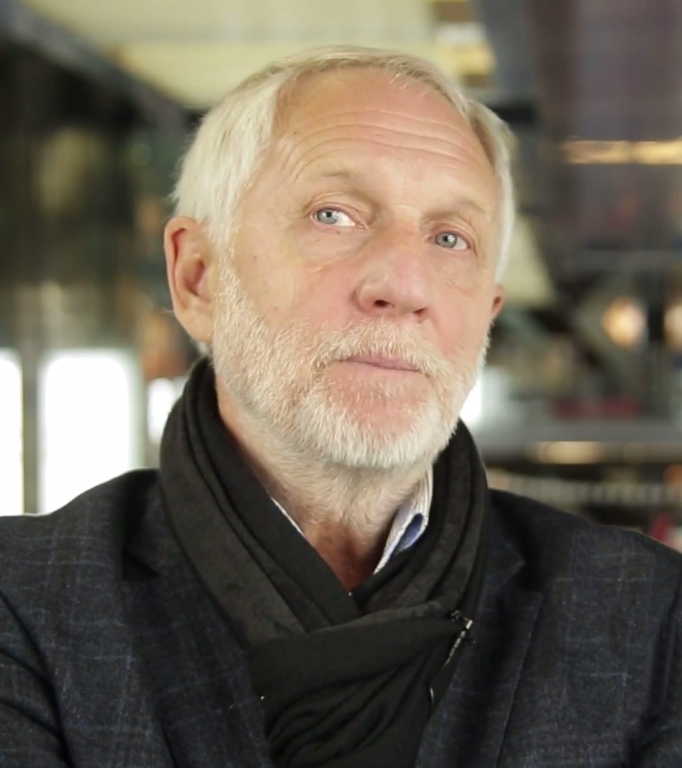
- Semago in 2013
- Born: Vladimir Vladimirovich Semago; 27 April 1947 (age 77); Moscow, RSFSR, USSR

Vladimir Vladimirovich Semago (Russian: Влади́мир Влади́мирович Сема́го; born 27 April 1947) is a Russian politician and businessman. Deputy of the State Duma of the first (1993-1995), the second (1995-1999) and fourth convocations (2003-2007, was a member since 2006). In the State Duma of the first and second convocations entered into a faction of the Communist Party (in the second part of the State Duma — until September 1998), in the State Duma of the fourth convocation — the faction United Russia. In 2016, he unsuccessfully ran for Duma from the Yabloko party. The president of the Energoprom Company.

Played a small role in the film by Stanislav Govorukhin Voroshilov Sharpshooter (1999) and Not Вy Вread Аlone (2005), Tycoon (2002) by Pavel Lungin.
