= Vladislav Galkin =

Russian actor

- Born: Vladislav Sukhachev; 25 December 1971; Leningrad, Soviet Union
- Died: 25 February 2010 (aged 38); Moscow, Russia
- Resting place: Troyekurovskoye Cemetery, Moscow
- Occupation: actor
- Years active: 1981–2010
- Known for: Truckers

Vladislav Borisovich Galkin (Russian: Владисла́в Бори́сович Га́лкин; 25 December 1971 – 25 February 2010) was a Russian actor who starred in fifty seven films including several TV serials, such as Spetsnaz (2002), The Master and Margarita (2005–2006) and Savages (2006).

== Biography ==
Galkin studied acting at the Boris Shchukin Theatre Institute from 1988 to 1992, then studied film directing at the All-Union State Institute of Cinematography in the 1990 where his teacher was Vladimir Khotinenko.

On 27 February 2010, Galkin was found dead in his apartment, and the cause of death was said to be cardiac arrest. However, according to his family and friends, he was murdered based on evidence indicating the presence of other people in his room just before his death and the disappearance of $130,000 from his apartment. The police dismissed this version. Galkin's death was mourned by many who demanded finding those responsible for his death.

Colleagues have said Galkin was suffering from a drinking problem. In 2009, he was charged with hooliganism using a weapon and non-life-threatening violence against a law enforcement official, after an attack on a police lieutenant at a bar in July. In December, he was convicted to a suspended sentence of 14 months.

== Selected filmography ==
- The Adventures of Tom Sawyer and Huckleberry Finn (1981) as Huckleberry Finn
- The Rifleman of the Voroshilov Regiment (1999) as Alexey Podberyozkin, local policeman
- Truckers (2001) as Alexander 'Sashok' Korovin, truck driver
- In August of 1944 (2001) as Senior Lieutenant Yevgeny Tamantsev
- Sketch on the Monitor (2001) as Oleg
- Spetsnaz (2002) as Senior Lieutenant 'Yakut' Urmanov
- Investigation Led by Experts (2002) as Avdeev
- Yeralash (2002) as prisoner
- 72 Meters (2004) as Senior Warrant Officer Mikhaylov
- Deadly Force 6 (2005) as Bespalov
- The Fall of the Empire (2005) as Nikitin, chief of counterintelligence
- The Master and Margarita (2005) as Ivan Bezdomny, poet
- Savages (2006) as Chorny, mechanic and leader-production
