= Dmitriyevka, Shebekinsky District, Belgorod Oblast =

Dmitriyevka Дмитриевка
- Selo
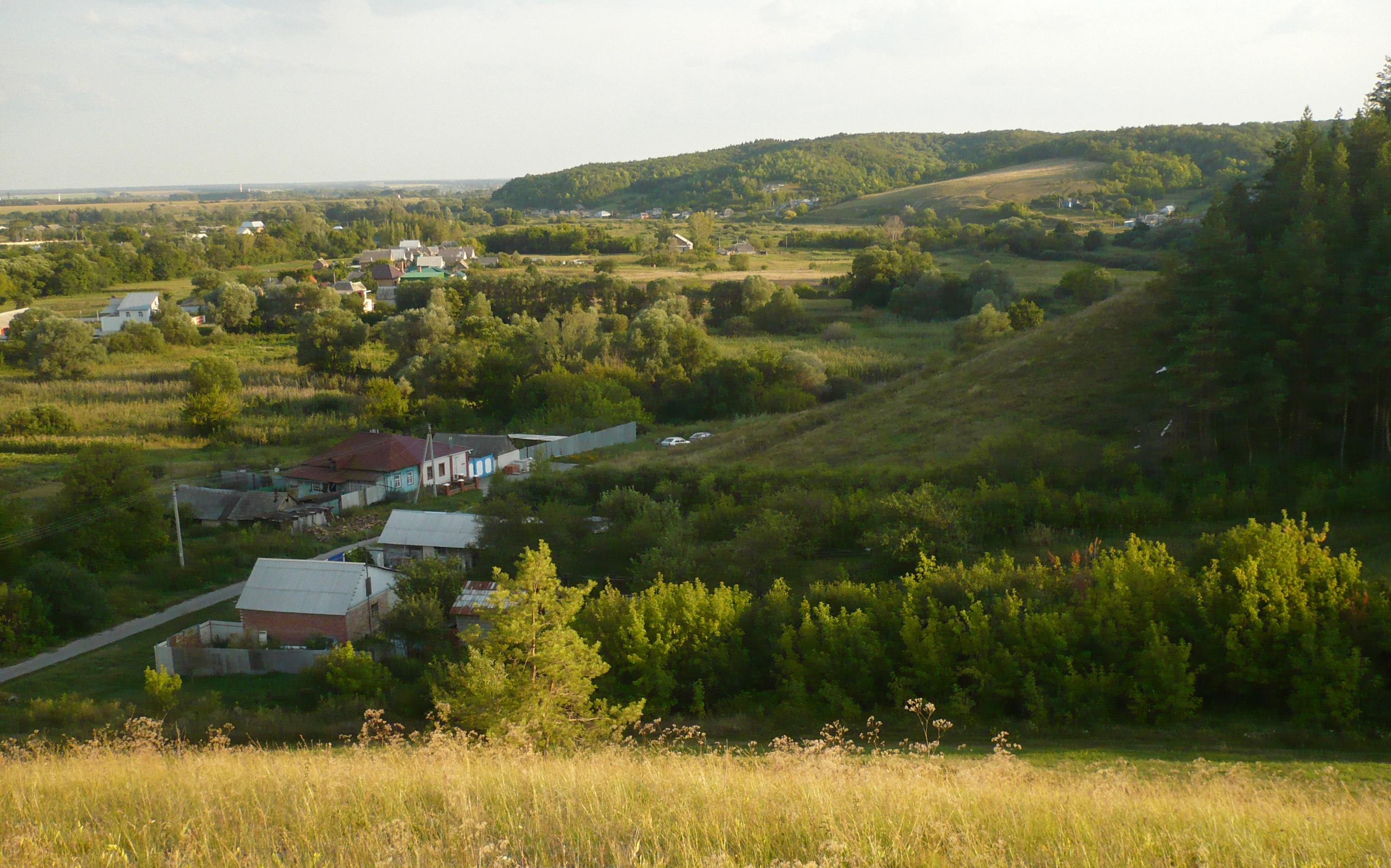
- The selo of Dmitriyevka.

- Location within Belgorod Oblast Location within Russia
- Coordinates: 50°29′N 37°00′E
- Country: Russia
- Region: Belgorod Oblast
- District: Shebekinsky District
- Time zone: UTC+3:00

Dmitriyevka (Russian: Дмитриевка) is a rural locality (a selo) in Shebekinsky District, Belgorod Oblast, Russia. The population was 593 as of 2010. There are 8 streets.

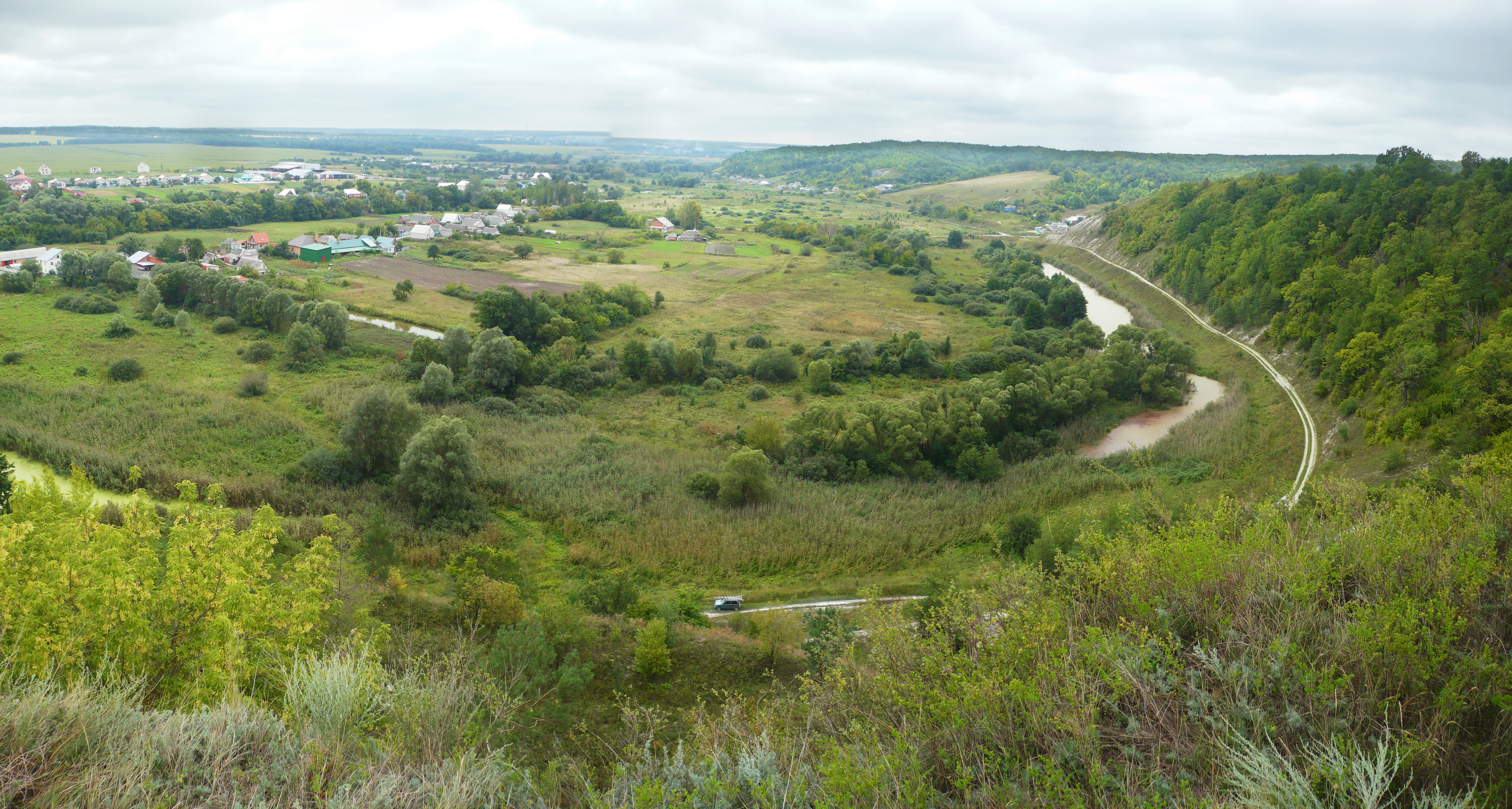
Dmitriyevka settlement. View of the southeastern outskirts of Posad. 2012.

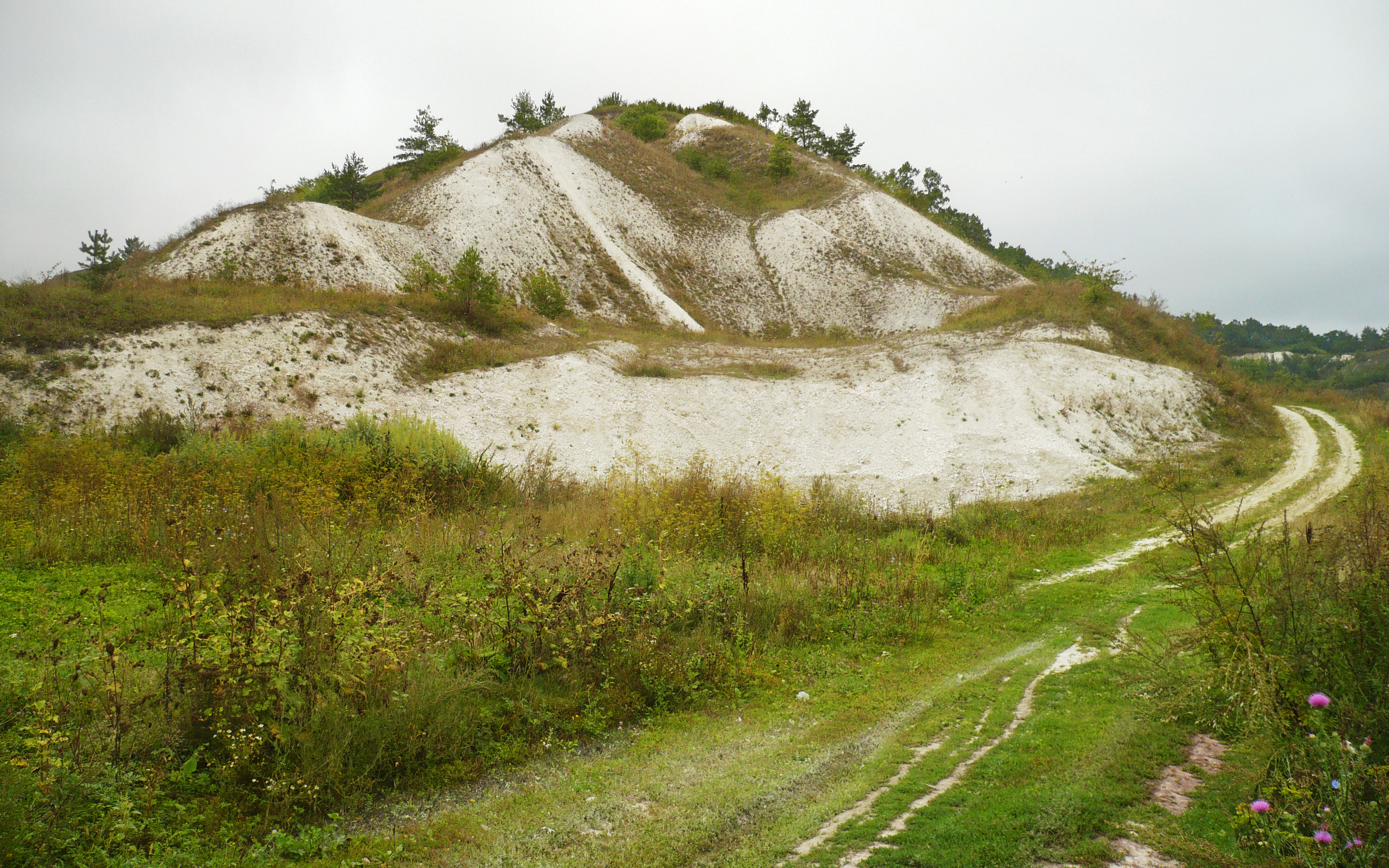
View of the hillfort from the south.

== Geography ==
Dmitriyevka is located 24 km northeast of Shebekino (the district's administrative centre) by road. Dobroye is the nearest rural locality.
