= Admiral (2008 film) =

- Directed by: Andrei Kravchuk
- Written by: Zoya Kudrya; Vladimir Valutsky
- Based on: Life of Alexander Kolchak
- Produced by: Dzhanik Fayziev; Anatoliy Maksimov; Dmitry Yurkov
- Starring: Konstantin Khabensky; Elizaveta Boyarskaya; Sergey Bezrukov; Anna Kovalchuk
- Cinematography: Igor Grinyakin; Aleksei Rodionov
- Edited by: Tom Rolf
- Music by: Gleb Matveychuk; Ruslan Muratov
- Distributed by: 20th Century Fox
- Release date: October 9, 2008
- Running time: 124 minutes
- Country: Russia
- Languages: Russian; French
- Budget: $22 million
- Box office: $39.15 million

Admiral (Russian: Адмиралъ; stylized to resemble pre-revolutionary Russian, modern spelling: Russian: Адмирал) is a 2008 biopic about Alexander Kolchak, a vice admiral in the Imperial Russian Navy and leader of the anti-communist White movement during the Russian Civil War. The film also depicts the love triangle between the Admiral, his wife, and the poet Anna Timiryova.

An extended version of the movie was made into a 10-part TV mini-series which was shown by Channel One in 2009.

== Plot ==
During the production of War and Peace at Mosfilm in 1964, an elderly Russian noblewoman is set to appear as an extra. The film's political commissar demands her dismissal due to her aristocratic background, but director Sergei Bondarchuk is adamant that she stays.

In 1916, Captain Alexander Kolchak's ship is laying naval mines in the Baltic Sea when they are blocked by SMS Friedrich Carl of the Imperial German Navy. Kolchak leads his men in Russian Orthodox prayers for protection as they lure the German ship towards their mines and it sinks. At the naval base in the Grand Duchy of Finland, Kolchak is promoted to rear admiral and introduced to Anna Timiryova, the wife of subordinate officer and close friend Captain Sergei Timirev. Although Sergei reminds his wife, that they took vows before God, Anna is unmoved and wants nothing more than to be with the Admiral. Terrified of losing Kolchak, his wife Sofya offers to leave for Petrograd, but Kolchak is adamant about their marriage. When Anna delivers a letter to Kolchak he informs her that they can never meet, professing his love for her.

Tsar Nicholas II personally promotes Kolchak to vice admiral and commander of the Black Sea Fleet at Sevastopol. After the February Revolution in 1917, Tsarist officers are disarmed and executed at the Kronstadt naval base. Sergei barely escapes with Anna. A group of enlisted men arrive aboard Kolchak's flotilla demanding all officers surrender their arms. Kolchak orders his subordinates to obey and throws his own sword into the harbour.

Kolchak is summoned by Alexander Kerensky and offered the position of Minister of Defense. Kolchak accepts on the condition they restore old Imperial Army practices. Kerensky refuses and offers him exile in the United States, ostensibly because the Allies need him as an expert to take Constantinople by naval attack. Shortly after, his wife and son are rescued from their home in Crimea and whisked away to a British ship, just before the house is attacked by Red Guards.

In 1918, Anna and Sergei are travelling on the Trans-Siberian Railway when she learns Kolchak is setting up an anti-Bolshevik army in Omsk. Sergei is dismayed when Anna announces that she is leaving him and becomes a nurse in the Russian Civil War. Kolchak learns the Red Army is advancing on Omsk, he orders an evacuation and seizes Irkutsk as the new capital of anti-communist Russia.

Anna is recognized by a White officer who informs Kolchak; they meet and he vows never to leave her again, explaining he has asked Sofya for divorce. He proposes to Anna, but she insists that there is no need for marriage. Eventually, she relents and they are seen attending the Divine Liturgy together.

Meanwhile, Irkutsk is under the nominal control of French General Maurice Janin and the Czechoslovak Legion. With their defenses disintegrating, the Red Army offers a way out alive. As a result, General Janin agrees to hand over Kolchak. Kolchak and Anna are arrested by the Czechs and handed over to the Reds. Reinforcements, led by Kolchak's ally General Vladimir Kappel, eventually reach Irkutsk just in time to rescue Kolchak; however the offensive fails. Kolchak is put on trial by the Irkutsk soviet and executed with his former Prime Minister along the banks of the frozen Angara River. His last words are, "Send word to my wife in Paris that I bless our son". Their bodies are dumped into an opening in the ice, hewn up by the local Orthodox clergy for the Great Blessing of Waters on Theophany.

The story then returns to 1964 at Mosfilm. It is revealed that Anna is the noblewoman who appears as an extra in War and Peace. As she witnesses a rehearsal for one of the film's ballroom scenes, she recalls her first meeting with Kolchak, and her dreams of the formal dance she was never able to share with her beloved.

=== Epilogue ===
- Anna was arrested numerous times following Kolchak's execution and survived nearly 40 years in the Gulag before her release in 1960. She died in Moscow in January 1975, aged 81.
- Sergei became a rear admiral commanding the White Russian Navy in Siberia before fleeing to China, where he captained Chinese steamers. He settled in Shanghai's White Russian community, where he died in 1932.
- Sophya Kolchak joined her son in exile in Paris. She died in the Longjumeau Hospital in 1956.
- Kolchak's son Rostislav fought with the Free French Forces during the Second World War. He died in Paris in 1965.

== Cast ==
- Konstantin Khabensky – Admiral Alexander Kolchak
- Sergey Bezrukov – General Vladimir Kappel
- Vladislav Vetrov – Captain Sergey Timiryov
- Elizaveta Boyarskaya – Anna Timiryova
- Anna Kovalchuk – Sofia Kolchak
- Egor Beroev – Mikhail Smirnov
- Richard Bohringer – General Maurice Janin
- Viktor Verzhbitsky – Alexander Kerensky
- Nikolai Burlyayev – Nicholas II of Russia
- Fyodor Bondarchuk – Director Sergei Bondarchuk
- Olga Ostroumova
- Nikolay Reutov
- Igor Savochkin
- Mikhail Eliseev

== Themes ==
According to director Andrei Kravchuk, "[The film is] about a man who tries to create history, to take an active part in history, as he gets caught in the turmoil. However, he keeps on struggling, he preserves his honour and his dignity, and he continues to love."

Actress Elizaveta Boyarskaya said of her character, "She was a woman of such force, of such will, with such magnanimity... I feel an amazing resemblance to her... When I read script, I was even a bit scared: because she has the same vision of history as me. All that can arrive at is me. And when I played Anna, I did not play, I was her. It is my epoch, my attitude regarding love."

After being asked about the film alluding to a verse from Song of Songs, she stated, "Admiral is compared to Doctor Zhivago, Anna Karenina, and I think this is no coincidence. Our literature is replete with examples of women capable of heroic deeds for the sake of their feelings. For the sake of that great love that is given to a person from above as a gift, for which you are ready to do anything."

== Production ==
The film had 210 shooting days. Work on the picture took four years. Principal photography lasted for a year-and-half with a two to three-month break. Locations included Moscow, Saint Petersburg, Sevastopol, Torzhok and Irkutsk. The twelve-minute battle scene took a month to shoot. Twenty-four thousand CGI shots were incorporated into the film. Khabensky had to wear an orthopedic corset due to poor posture.

== Release and reception ==
The first screening of the film took place on October 9, 2008. Reception of the movie by Russian critics was mixed.

Because Kolchak had been portrayed as a villain in Soviet historiography, the film encountered some controversy in Russia due to its reversal of roles. In the United States, Leslie Felperin of Variety wrote: "Strictly as a film, however, Admiral is entertaining enough in a retro Doctor Zhivago/War and Peace sort of way, with its big setpieces, lavish costumes and string-laden orchestral score. For all intents and purposes, pic reps a virtual mirror image of those old patriotic Soviet-era movies wherein the Reds were the heroes and the White Army the baddies."

=== Historical inaccuracies ===
Almost the entire film is a fictional story, with the exception of names and dates, everything else is gross historical inaccuracies. For example, the scene in which a shell from the 102-mm gun of the destroyer Sibirsky Strelok hits the German cruiser Friedrich Karl is fiction. In reality, Sibirsky Strelok was the flagship of Captain 1st Rank A.V. Kolchak, and under his command a group of Baltic Fleet destroyers really did lay mines that blew up the small cruisers SMS Augsburg, Gazelle, and the cruiser Friedrich Karl, but there was no such combat clash. In addition, the film begins in 1916, and the German ships in question were blown up in 1914.

=== Awards ===
- MTV Russia Movie Awards
  - Best Film
  - Best Male Actor (Konstantin Khabensky)
  - Best Actress (Elizaveta Boyarskaya)
  - Best Spectacular Scene
- Golden Eagle Award
  - Best Male Actor (Konstantin Khabensky)
  - Best Cinematography
  - Best Costumes
  - Best Sound

== Soundtrack ==
The main original song for the film, "Anna", is performed by Russian singer Victoria Dayneko and composed by Igor Matvienko. The poem itself was written by Anna Timireva in memory of the Admiral. "Vopreki" ("Despite") was written by Konstantin Meladze and performed by Valery Meladze.
