= List of Russian films of 2015 =

The following films were produced in Russia in 2015 (see 2015 in film).

== Highest-grossing films ==
Title	Budget	Box office
Seventh Son	$95 million	$114.2 million $18.1 million (Russia) $96.1 million (Worldwide)
The Snow Queen 2: The Snow King	$5 million	$11.9 million $6 million (Russia) $5.9 million (Worldwide)
Battle for Sevastopol	124 million RUB	$8.7 million
Soulless 2	140 million RUB	$7.9 million
Ghost	N/A	$7.7 million
The Dawns Here Are Quiet	220 million RUB	$5.2 million

== Film releases ==
	Title	Russian title	Director	Cast	Genre	Details
January 1	Three heroes. Horse Course	Три богатыря: Ход конем	Konstantin Feoktistov	Sergei Makovetsky, Valeriy Solovyov, Oleg Kulikovich, Dmitriy Bykovskiy	Animation, Action	Melnitsa Animation Studio, Melnitsa's The Three Bogatyrs
January 1	The Snow Queen 2: The Snow King	Снежная королева 2: Перезаморозка	Alexey Tsitsilin	Sharlto Copley, Bella Thorne, Isabelle Fuhrman, Sean Bean	Animation	Animation, produced by Wizart Animation and Bazelevs Distribution
January 22	Two Women	Две Женщины	Vera Glagoleva	Anna Vartanyan, Ralph Fiennes, Aleksandr Baluev, Sylvie Testud	Drama film	Based on Ivan Turgenev's play A Month in the Country.
January 29	Paws, Bones & Rock'n'roll	Ёлки лохматые	Maksim Sveshnikov	Valeriya Strelyaeva, Galina Konshina, Andrey Merzlikin, Yan Tsapnik	Comedy, Family	
February 6	Seventh Son	Седьмой сын	Sergei Bodrov	Jeff Bridges, Ben Barnes, Alicia Vikander, Kit Harington	Fantasy	Universal Pictures; Russo-American production. It was released in 3-D and IMAX 3D February 6, 2015.
February 6	Pioneer Heroes	Пионеры-герои	Natalia Kudryashova	Natalia Kudryashova, Darya Moroz, Aleksey Mitin	Drama	
February 20	Battalion	Батальонъ	Dmitriy Meshiev	Mariya Aronova, Maria Kozhevnikova; Valeriya Shkirando	War	
March 5	Soulless 2	Духless 2	Roman Prygunov	Danila Kozlovsky, Mariya Andreyeva, Miloš Biković	Drama	produced by KinoSlovo and Art Pictures Studio, Co-production with Feodor Bondarchuk
March 26	Ghost	Призрак	Aleksandr Voytinskiy	Fedor Bondarchuk	Comedy	
April 16	Territory	Территория	Aleksandr Melnik	Konstantin Lavronenko, Grigoriy Dobrygin, Egor Beroev, Yevgeny Tsyganov, Vladislav Abashin	Adventure, Drama	VolgaFilm
May 9	The Dawns Here Are Quiet	А зори здесь тихие	Renat Davletyarov	Pyotr Fyodorov, Anastasia Mikulchina, Evgenia Malakhova, Agniya Kuznetsova, Sofia Lebedeva, Kristina Asmus	War	Based on the novel by Boris Vasilyev
May 21	Once	Однажды	Renat Davletyarov	Yuriy Deynekin, Darya Melnikova, Nikita Kalinin	Comedy, Drama, Melodrama	
June 4	Under Electric Clouds	Под электрическими облаками	Aleksei German	Louis Franck, Chulpan Khamatova, Merab Ninidze	Drama	
June 10	Rag Union	Тряпичный союз	Mikhail Mestetskiy	Vasiliy Butkevich, Pavel Chinaryov, Ivan Yankovsky	Comedy, Drama	
	Ovechka Dolli byla zlaya i rano umerla	Овечка Долли была злая и рано умерла	Aleksey Pimanov		Adventure	Set in 1985
April 2	Battle for Sevastopol	Битва за Севастополь	Sergey Mokritskiy	Yulia Peresild, Joan Blackham, Yevgeny Tsyganov, Oleg Vasilkov	War film	Based on life of Lyudmila Pavlichenko and co-produced with Ukraine.
September 3	Moscow Never Sleeps	Москва никогда не спит	Johnny O'Reilly	Evgeniya Khirivskaya, Oleg Dolin, Mikhail Yefremov, Lyubov Aksenova	Drama	Official website (in English)
September 10	Queen of Spades: The Dark Rite	Пиковая дама: Чёрный обряд	Svyatoslav Podgaevskiy	Alina Babak, Igor Khripunov, Vladimir Seleznyov, Mariya Fomina	Supernatural horror	
October 1	The Warrior	Воин	Aleksey Andrianov	Sergey Bondarchuk Jr, Vladimir Yaglych, Fedor Bondarchuk, Svetlana Khodchenkova	Sport	Central Partnership
October 8	14+	14+	Andrey Zaytsev	Gleb Kalyuzhny, Ulyana Vaskovich, Olga Ozollapinya	Coming-of-age	
October 22	Without Borders	Без границ	Karen Oganesyan	Aleksandr Pal, Mariya Shalayeva, Inna Churikova	Comedy	
October 27	The Gulls	Чайки	Ella Manzheeva	Eugenia Mandzhieva, Evgeniy Sangadzhiev, Lyubov Ubushieva	Drama	
November 5	Locust	Саранча	Egor Baranov	Paulina Andreeva, Pyotr Fyodorov, Yekaterina Volkova, Evgeniya Dmitrieva	Crime, Drama, Thriller	
November 12	A Warrior's Tail	Савва. Сердце воина	Maksim Fadeyev	Maxim Chikhachyov, Fyodor Bondarchuk, Konstantin Khabensky	Animation	Animation, produced by Glukoza Production
November 17	Orlean	Орлеан	Andrey Proshkin	Elena Lyadova, Vitaliy Khaev, Viktor Sukhorukov	Comedy thriller	
November 26	Green Carriage	Зеленая карета	Oleg Asadulin	Andrey Merzlikin, Viktoriya Isakova, Aleksandr Michkov	Drama	
November 26	The Teacher	Училка	Aleksey Petrukhin	Irina Kupchenko, Anna Churina, Andrei Merzlikin.	Drama	
December 3	He's a Dragon (I Am Dragon)	Он - дракон	Indar Dzhendubaev	Maria Poezzhaeva, Matvey Lykov, Stanislav Lyubshin, Ieva Andrejevaite, Pyotr Romanov	Romance, Fantasy, Adventure	Bazelevs Distribution / Netflix; The romantic fantasy about love is a terrible fairy tale.
December 3	The Land of Oz	Страна ОЗ	Vassily Sigarev	Yana Troyanova, Gosha Kutsenko, Andrey Ilenkov, Yevgeny Tsyganov	Comedy	
December 10	About Love	Про любовь	Anna Melikyan	Renata Litvinova, Kristina Isaykina, Mariya Shalayeva, Ravshana Kurkova	Comedy drama	
December 24	The Very Best Day	Самый лучший день	Zhora Kryzhovnikov	Dmitry Nagiev, Olga Seryabkina, Yuliya Aleksandrova	Comedy	

== See also ==
- 2015 in film
- 2015 in Russia
