= List of Russian films of 2009 =

A list of films produced in Russia in 2009 (see 2009 in film).

== 2009 ==
Title	Russian title	Director	Cast	Genre	Notes
Alice's Birthday	День рождения Алисы	Sergey Seryogin	Yasya Nikolaeva, Alexey Kolgan, Evgeniy Stychkin, Natalya Guseva	Children's science fiction	Animation based on Alisa Selezneva books by Kir Bulychov
The Best Movie 2	Самый лучший фильм 2	Oleg Fomin	Garik Kharlamov, Mikhail Galustyan	Comedy	
Black Lightning	Чёрная Молния	Alexandr Voitinsky, Dmitry Kiseilov	Grigoriy Dobrygin, Ekaterina Vilkova, Sergei Garmash, Viktor Verzhbitsky	Superhero	first Russian superhero film
The Book of Masters	Книга мастеров	Vadim Sokolovsky	Mariya Andreyeva	Fantasy	
Bride at Any Cost	Невеста любой ценой	Dimitri Grachov	Pavel Volya	Comedy	
Bury Me Behind the Baseboard	Похороните меня за плинтусом	Sergey Snezhkin	Svetlana Kryuchkova, Alexei Petrenko, Maria Shukshina	Drama	
By the Will of Chingis Khan	Andrei Borissov		Eduard Ondar, Orgil Makhaan	Historical	co-produced with Mongolia
Crush	Короткое замыкание	Pyotr Buslov, Aleksey German Jr., Kirill Serebrennikov, Ivan Vyrypaev, Boris Khlebnikov	Irina Butanaeva, Yuriy Chursin	Drama	
Dneiperline: Love and War	Днепровский рубеж	Igor Sigov			
Jolly Fellows	Весельчаки	Felix Mikhailov	Ville Haapasalo, Danila Kozlovsky	Comedy-drama	
Help Gone Mad	Сумасшедшая помощь	Boris Khlebnikov	Evgeniy Sytyy, Sergey Dreyden	Comedy	
High Security Vacation	Каникулы строгого режима	Igor Zaytsev	Sergey Bezrukov, Dmitri Dyuzhev, Alyona Babenko, Vladimir Menshov	Comedy	
Hooked on the Game	На игре	Pavel Sanayev	Sergei Chirkov, Marina Petrenko, Pavel Priluchny	Action	
I Am	Я	Igor Voloshin	Artur Smolyaninov, Oksana Akinshina, Aleksei Gorbunov	Drama	
I Believe!	Верую!	Lidia Bobrova	Aleksandr Aravushkin	Drama	
Forbidden Reality, or Interceptor	запрещенная действительность	Konstantin Maximov		Action	
The Inhabited Island, part 2	Обитаемый остров	Fyodor Bondarchuk	Vasiliy Stepanov, Yuliya Snigir, Pyotr Fyodorov, Aleksei Serebryakov, Fyodor Bondarchuk	Science fiction	Based on Prisoners of Power by Strugatskies.
Kitty	Кошечка	Grigory Konstantinopolsky	Pavel Derevyanko, Mikhail Efremov	Comedy	
Love in the Big City	Любовь в большом городе	Maryus Vaysberg	Aleksey Chadov, Ville Haapasalo, Volodymyr Zelenskyy, Vera Brezhneva	Romantic comedy	
Lyubka	Любка	Stanislav Mitin	Elena Lyadova, Anastasiya Gorodentseva	Drama	
The Man Who Knew Everything	Человек, который знал всё	Vladimir Mirzoyev	Egor Beroev	Drama	
The Miracle	Чудо	Aleksandr Proshkin	Konstantin Khabensky, Vitaliy Kishchenko, Polina Kutepova	Drama	Entered into the 31st Moscow International Film Festival
Newsmakers	Горячие новости	Anders Banke	Andrey Merzlikin, Yevgeny Tsyganov	Action, thriller	
O Lucky Man!	О, счастливчик!	Edouard Parri	Mikhail Tarabukin	Comedy	
Olympus Inferno	Олимпиус Инферно	Igor Voloshin	David Henry, Polina Filonenko	War Drama	About the 2008 South Ossetia war
Oxygen	Кислород	Ivan Vyrypaev	Aleksey Filimonov, Karolina Gruszka	Drama	
Pete on the Way to Heaven	Петя по дороге в царство небесное	Nikolay Dostal	Egor Pavlov	Drama	Won the Golden George at the 31st Moscow International Film Festival
The Priest	Поп	Vladimir Khotinenko	Sergei Makovetsky, Nina Usatova, Liza Arzamasova	Drama	
The Return of the Musketeers	Возвращение мушкетёров	Georgi Yungvald-Khilkevich	Mikhail Boyarsky, Veniamin Smekhov, Igor Starygin, Valentin Smirnitsky	Musical, adventure	An apocryphal sequel to 1978 adaptation of Dumas classic
Room and a Half	Полторы комнаты или сентиментальное путешествие на родину	Andrei Khrzhanovsky	Alisa Freindlich		
Russia 88	Россия 88	Pavel Bardin	Pyotr Fyodorov	Mockumentary	
Tale in the Darkness	Сказка про темноту	Nikolay Khomeriki	Alisa Khazanova, Yuri Safarov, Boris Kamorzin	Drama	Competing in the Un Certain Regard section at the 2009 Cannes Film Festival
Taras Bulba	Тарас Бульба	Vladimir Bortko	Bohdan Stupka, Igor Petrenko, Vladimir Vdovichenkov	History	Russo-Ukrainian film, based on the book of the same name by Nikolai Gogol.
Tambourine, Drum	Бубен, барабан	Aleksey Mizgiryov	Natalya Negoda, Elena Lyadova	Drama	
Tsar	Царь	Pavel Lungin	Pyotr Mamonov, Oleg Yankovsky	History	About Ivan the Terrible. Competing in the Un Certain Regard section at the 2009 Cannes Film Festival
Ward No. 6	Палата № 6	Aleksandr Gornovsky, Karen Shakhnazarov	Vladimir Ilyin, Aleksey Vertkov	Drama	
Wolfy	Волчок	Vasily Sigarev	Polina Pluchek, Yana Troyanova	Drama	

== See also ==
- 2009 in Russia
