= Gennadi Vengerov =

Russian actor (1959–2015)

- Born: Gennadi Aronovich Vengerov; 27 August 1959; Vitebsk, Byelorussian SSR, Soviet Union
- Died: 22 April 2015 (aged 55); Düsseldorf, Germany
- Occupations: Actor, announcer
- Years active: 1978–2015
- Website: vengerov.net

Gennadi Aronovich Vengerov (Russian: Геннадий Аронович Венгеров; 27 August 1959 – 22 April 2015) was a Soviet, Russian and German film and theatre actor, narrator and voice-over artist.

== Biography ==
Vengerov was born on 27 August 1959 in Vitebsk, Belarus. After graduating from the Technical School for Architecture and Construction and a short-term employment as a construction engineer, he started his creative career as an announcer of the Vitebsk Regional Radio. Не performed at the People's Theatre in Vitebsk. In 1980 he was invited to be an actor at the professional scene to the Yakub Kolas Belarus National Academic Drama Theatre.

Following his military service in the Soviet Army in 1983 he entered the School-Studio (Institute of Higher Education) at the Moscow Art Theatre for the course by professors Viktor Monyukov and Vladimir Bogomolov. In 1986, on his 4th course year, together with his course mate Mikhail Yefremov they established Sovremennik 2 theatre. In 1989 he was invited to the troop of Moscow Academic Mayakovsky Theatre.

Gennadi Vengerov continued his career in Germany in 1990 as an announcer of Deutsche Welle Radio and an actor of Düsseldorfer Schauspielhaus. From 1995 to 2000 he has been an actor of Bochum Theatre.

Since 2004 he has been actively filming in Russian cinema and TV projects, participated in theatrical productions in Moscow, as voice over talent he made audio records for documentaries, fictional films and advertisements. He is the brand voice of the Russian News Broadcasting Station - RSN and the Russian brand voice Euronews international channel. In 2009 he narrated TV-Show "Men’s Stories with Gennadi Vengerov" on the Russian REN TV channel.

During his career Gennadi Vengerov starred in more than 140 movies in Russia, United States, England, Austria and Germany. At various times he worked with Jude Law, James Cromwell, Sean Bean, Til Schweiger, Christian Slater, Ving Rhames, Mario Adorf, Colm Meaney, Franka Potente, Jan Josef Liefers, Klaus Löwitsch and other famous actors. He is widely known and recognized in Russia for the roles of blacksmith Vulkan (The Fighter series) and Major Volkov (Hour of Volkov series) and among German audience for the role businessman Viktor Strelnikov (Gute Zeiten, schlechte Zeiten).

He died on the morning of 22 April 2015 in Düsseldorf. In memory of the actor was dedicated to the program Live broadcast with Boris Korchevnikov (TV channel “Russia-1”) dated 23 April 2015.

== Selected filmography ==
- 1987: Story about Nothing as Sheya
- 1989: Step (Short) as Boris
- 1989: Deja Vu as Attendant Petrovich
- 1989: Cursed Days in Russia Again as Major Babakhanov
- 1991: Lovkach and Khippoza as Boxer
- 1991: Manta – Der Film as SaschaPanewski
- 1993: Pauline In Between as Worker #3
- 1992: Wehner – die unerzählte Geschichte (TV Movie) as Kommissar NKWD
- 1993: Berlin Break (TV Series) as Gregor Iwanowitch
- 1993: Maus und Katz (TV Movie) as Lubomir Stykov
- 1993: Mein Mann ist mein Hobby (TV Movie) as Ivan
- 1993: Westerdeich (TV Series) as Hassan
- 1993: Brandheiss. Verkehr macht frei (TV Series) as Boris Kasanski
- 1994: Lutz und Hardy (TV Series) as Holub
- 1994-1996: Die Stadtindianer (TV Series) as Bubi
- 1994-1999: Der Fahnder (TV Series) as Carlo / Herbert Kraske / Slavik
- 1994-2012: Tatort (TV Series) as Arzt / Radovan Jurkic / Alex Barold / Nikita Gurganov
- 1995: Ein Bayer auf Rügen (TV Series) as Fedor Begulow
- 1995-1998: Die Straßen von Berlin (TV Series) as Stevic / Mischa / Smocking
- 1996: Mona M.: So nicht, Frau Staatsanwalt (TV Series) as Oleg Petjuschkin
- 1996: Jailbirds as Atom Otto
- 1996: Der Mörder und die Hure (TV Movie) as Piotr
- 1996: Die Drei (TV Series) as Wladimir
- 1996: Ein flotter Dreier (TV Series) as Boris
- 1996: Die Wache (TV Series) as Myschkin
- 1996: Rache ist süss (TV Movie) as Alex
- 1996: The Writing on the Wall (TV Movie) as General Timoshkin
- 1996: The Last Courier (TV Movie) as Bunin (uncredited)
- 1996: Bockerer II as General Alexandrov
- 1996: The Shadow Man (TV Series) as Heinz
- 1997: Gone Wrong as Manfred Manner
- 1997: Der kleine Mogler as Zirkusdirektor
- 1997-2003: Ein Fall für zwei (TV Series) as Stefan Lerch / Stan Czermak
- 1997: Parkhotel Stern (TV Series) as Demidov
- 1997-1998: Balko (TV Series) as Khaled / Mehnert
- 1998: Geliebter Gegner (TV Movie) as Mikhail Krimov
- 1999: Stan Becker (TV Series) as Oleg
- 1999: Die Blendung (TV Movie) as Ralf Eger
- 1999: Klinikum Berlin Mitte (TV Series) as Trainer
- 2000: Anatomy as Präparator
- 2000: Der letzte Zeuge (TV Series) as Boris (uncredited)
- 2000: OP ruft Dr. Bruckner (TV Series) as Artjom Tarassov
- 2000: Zwei Brüder (TV Series) as Juri Jaschwili
- 2000: Anniversaries (TV Mini-Series) as Major Jenukidze
- 2001: Enemy at the Gates as Starshina
- 2001: HeliCops – Einsatz über Berlin (TV Series) as Sergej Romanow
- 2001: The Tanker (TV Movie) as Bootsmann Shelikov
- 2001: Der Clown (TV Series) as Tschernik
- 2001: Im Namen des Gesetzes (TV Series) as Peter Bock
- 2001: Das Amt (TV Series) as Igor Topolev
- 2001: Mr. Boss (TV Series) as Marat Bayramov
- 2002: Edel und Starck (TV Series) as Onkel Melis
- 2002: Zwei Engel auf Streife (TV Series) as Maxim Oblomov
- 2002: Erkan und Stefan gegen die Mächte der Finsternis as Möllner
- 2003: Ohne Worte (TV Series) as Trainer
- 2003: Crazy Race (TV Movie) as Tsintatses
- 2003: Alles Atze (TV Series) as 'Milla' Millanowski
- 2004: The Blindflyers as Russian with beard
- 2004: Unter Brüdern (TV Series) as Boris
- 2004: Moscow Heat as Senator Shishov
- 2004: The Fighter as Blacksmith Vulkan
- 2004: Swan Heaven as Nikolay Yegorovich
- 2004-2005: Gute Zeiten, schlechte Zeiten (TV Series) as Viktor Strelnikov
- 2005: Tmunot Matzkhikot as Alik
- 2005: Girls as Boris Ortenberg
- 2005: The Blind 2 (TV Series) as Pavel
- 2005: You is Me (TV Series) as Zimmer
- 2006: Die Camper (TV Series) as Sergej
- 2006: Goldene Zeiten as Sergey
- 2006: Ladyland (TV Series) as Tracker Karl
- 2006: Schimanski (TV Series) as Jannis
- 2006: Mustang (not finished) as Counselor
- 2006: Maltese Cross as Terminator
- 2006: Who's the Boss as Restaurant owner
- 2007: Holy Cause as Modest Morozovskiy
- 2007: Hour of Volkov (TV Series) as Major Volkov
- 2007: The Fighter: Birth of the Legend as Blacksmith Vulkan
- 2007: One Family as Khan
- 2008: The Sea Wolf (TV Movie) as Turner
- 2008: Jazo as Boss
- 2008: Im Angesicht des Verbrechens (TV miniseries) as Major
- 2008: Criminal Video-2 as Ivan Sergeyev
- 2008: To the Sea! as Narrator (voice)
- 2008: The Inhabited Island as Narrator (voice)
- 2009: Dark Planet as Narrator (voice)
- 2009: Clouds above Hills (TV Series) as Admiral Yevgeni Ivanovich Alekseyev
- 2009: Überlebensstrategien für das neue Jahrtausend as Vater Vostok, Onkel Vostok
- 2009: The Last Secret of Mater (TV Series) as Petr Ivanovich Lomov
- 2009: Churchill: Death in Humidor as Pasha Silkov
- 2009: Hold-up as Cop
- 2009: The Inhabited Island. Skirmish as Narrator (voice)
- 2011: Quarter as Sergey Semenov
- 2010: Traumfabrik as Ernesto
- 2010: Nick of Time (TV Series) as Mikhalych
- 2010: Date as Moloch
- 2010: Juggler-2 as Pavel Voronov
- 2010: Traffic Cops (TV Series) as Prokhor Yasenev
- 2010: Beyond Law as Andrey Scherbakov
- 2010: Alibi for Two as Smolov
- 2010: Mother under the Contract as Christoph
- 2010: So oder so! as Eduard
- 2010: Danni Lowinski (TV Series) as Blumenhändler
- 2011: Theo (Short) as Narrator (voice)
- 2011: Investigating Committee (TV Series) as Colonel Salamov
- 2011: Wunder Punkt (Short) as Witek
- 2011: Hotel Lux as Upit
- 2011: Police Speaking (TV Series) as Eduard Burov
- 2011: Unreal Story as Gruppenführer Stoltz, Tatarian Idris
- 2011: Gulchatay as Bay Alisher
- 2011: Policemen Comrades (TV Series) as Dmitriy Veshnyakov
- 2012: Glory: A Tale of Mistaken Identities as Askisischer Beamter
- 2012: Soldiers of Fortune as Colonel Lupo
- 2012: Das Vermächtnis der Wanderhure (TV Movie) as Terbent Khan
- 2012: Poka as Sergej Michajlowitsch Paschkin
- 2012: Unreal Story 2 as Tatarian Idris
- 2012: Der Sarg as Marcel
- 2012: Baron on the Cannonball (TV Movie) as Vladimor
- 2013: Break Up Man as Vater Sokolow
- 2013: Heads or Tails as Therapist
- 2013: Widows as Arkadiy Markovich
- 2013: Double Blues as Colonel Ivan Yuriyevich Sosnovskiy
- 2013: HB Show as Igor Sergeyevich
- 2013: Adi as Aloiz
- 2013: Gulchatai 2 as Alisher
- 2013: A Man without Past as Colonel Petrov
- 2013: The Way of the Leader: Fire River as Narrator (voice)
- 2013: The Way of the Leader: Iron Mountain as Narrator (voice)
- 2013: Kathedralen der Kultur as Narrator (voice)
- 2014: Blast from the Past as Georgich
- 2014: Department as Komarov
- 2014: I Go to Save People as Lieutenant Colonel Baratov
- 2014: ED (Short) as Miro
- 2014: Borgia (TV Series) as Gabriel de Guzmann (final appearance)

== Roles in theatre ==
1. 1980 — Ivan-Svitannik, Galina Korzhanevskaya. Director: Valeriy Mazynskiy — Ivan-Vechernik — Yakub Kolas Belarus National Academic Drama Theatre
2. 1981 — Eternity Call, Hodar Dumbadze. Director: Valeriy Maslyuk — Chekist — Yakub Kolas National Academic Drama Theatre
3. 1986 — Sense Plot/Cuff, Yuriy Olesha. Director: Mikhail Yefremov — Andrey Babichev — Sovremennik 2
4. 1987 — The Seventh Labor of Hercules, Viktor Roschin. Director: Roman Heidze — Augeas/Crier — Sovremennik 2
5. 1989 — Sunset, Isaac Babel. Director: Andrey Goncharov — Bobrynetz — Mayakovsky Theatre
6. 1989 — Rumor, Afanasiy Salynskiy. Director: Andrey Goncharov — Pavel Fryazin — Mayakovsky Theatre
7. 1989 — Rosencrantz and Guildenstern Are Dead, Tom Stoppard. Director: Yevgeniy Arye— Chamberlain — Mayakovsky Theatre
8. 1991 — Die schöne Fremde, Klaus Pohl. Director: Dimitr Gotcheff — Pole — Düsseldorfer Schauspielhaus
9. 1992 — Prometheus Bound, Aeschylus. Director: Herbert König — Bia — Düsseldorfer Schauspielhaus
10. 1993 — A Midsummer Night's Dream, William Shakespeare. Director: David Mukhtar-Samurai — Chamberlain — Düsseldorfer Schauspielhaus
11. 1995 — Fatherlessness, Anton Chekhov. Director: Leander Haussmann — Bugrov — Schauspielhaus Bochum
12. 1995 — Brawling in Chioggia, Carlo Goldoni. Director: Leander Haussmann — Canocchia — Schauspielhaus Bochum
13. 1996 — Germany 3, Heiner Müller. Director: Leander Haussmann — Stalin — Schauspielhaus Bochum
14. 1996 — Diva, Dirk Dobrou. Director: Gil Mehmert — Wolfgang Becker — Schauspielhaus Bochum
15. 1996 — The Taming of the Shrew, William Shakespeare. Director: Leander Haussmann — Magister — Schauspielhaus Bochum
16. 1997 — Dolphin Cry, Ivan Okhlobystin. Director: Mikhail Yefremov — Ivan — Sovremennik Theatre
17. 2008 — MusicBox, Andrey Platonov. Director: Mikhail Yefremov — agent of sovkhoz — Sovremennik Theatre
18. 2009 — Das Leben des Siegfried, John von Düffel. Director: Gil Mehmert — Tuborg, king of Denmark — Nibelungenfestspiele Worms, Germany
