= Mariya Andreyeva =

Mariya Andreyeva may refer to:

- Maria Fyodorovna Andreyeva (1868–1953), Russian actress and Bolshevik administrator
- Mariya Andreyevna Andreyeva (born 1986), Russian actress
