= Master (TV series) =

- Genre: Sports drama
- Written by: Shaban Muslimov; Nina Shulika; Andrey Galanov; Andrey Zolotaryov; Stanislav Berestovoy
- Directed by: Stepan Korshunov
- Starring: Anatoliy Beliy; Igor Petrenko; Anton Vasilyev; Makar Zaporozhsky; Linda Lapinsh; Aristarkh Venes; Nikita Pavlenko
- Composer: Leonid Lener
- Country of origin: Russia
- Original language: Russian
- No. of seasons: 1
- No. of episodes: 8

Production
- Producers: Fyodor Bondarchuk; Timur Weinstein; Dmitry Tabarchuk; Vladimir Chagin; Vadim Ostrovsky; Alexander Rubin; Rodion Levinsky
- Cinematography: Vyacheslav Lisnevsky
- Running time: 49–60 minutes
- Production company: Art Pictures Studio

Original release
- Network: Premier; NTV
- Release: 18 February 2021 – present

Master (Russian: Мастер) is a Russian sports drama television series directed by Stepan Korshunov and produced by Art Pictures Studio for the streaming service Premier. The series premiered on 18 February 2021. The story centers on the Kamaz Master rally racing team.

== Plot ==
After winning the Dakar Rally, racer Vasily Kuznetsov becomes the new mentor of the KAMAZ-master team and completely renews its lineup in favor of younger drivers. Former champion Denis Sazonov attempts to return to the team after years of disgrace for abandoning his injured teammate Leonid Yeryomin during a race twelve years earlier. As the new team forms, preparations begin for the Silk Way Rally.

== Cast ==
=== Main cast ===
- Anatoliy Beliy as Vasily Kuznetsov
- Igor Petrenko as Leonid Yeryomin
- Anton Vasilyev as Denis Sazonov
- Makar Zaporozhsky as Sergey Belikov
- Linda Lapinsh as Zhenya Alekseenko
- Aristarkh Venes as Max Yeryomin
- Nikita Pavlenko as Nail

=== Supporting cast ===
- Sergey Shakurov as Valery Ryumin
- Angelina Poplavskaya as Sveta
- Ingrid Olerinskaya as Polina
- Oleg Filipchik as Semenych
- Evgeny Venediktov as Barsukov
- Polina Dolindo as Masha Korsunskaya
- Nikita Manets as Alyosha
- Anton Rival as Valverde
- Mikhail Volkov as Richards
- Alexey Sinitsyn as Jensen
- Sergey Lanbamin as Kirill Lobanov
- Valery Skorokosov as Eduard Arsenyev
- Wolfgang Cerny as Kron Racing representative
- Alexandra Chichkova as Zoya Yeryomina
