= Vasiliy Stepanov (actor) =

Russian actor (born 1986)

- Васи́лий Степа́нов
- Born: Vasiliy Sergeevich Stepanov; January 14, 1986 (age 40); Moscow, Russian SFSR, Soviet Union
- Years active: 2007–2018
- Height: 1.92 m (6 ft 4 in )
- Parent: Sergei Stepanov
- Awards: MTV Movie Awards, Russia (2009) - Nomination: "Best Kiss" (Shared with Yulia Snigir for The Inhabited Island) /MTV Movie Awards, Russia (2009) - Nomination: "Best Fight" (for The Inhabited Island)

Vasiliy Sergeevich Stepanov (Russian: Васи́лий Сергее́вич Степа́нов; born January 14, 1986) is a Russian actor who debuted in Bondarchuk's film The Inhabited Island as Maxim Kammerer (voiced by Maksim Matveyev).

== Biography ==
Vasiliy Stepanov was born in Russian Soviet Federal Socialist Republic. His school holidays he mostly spent in the country, at his grandmother's. He graduated from College of Physical Education and Sports, with teaching credentials. He is a candidate for master of hand to hand combat, despite being a smoker with experience.

On April 10, 2017, Stepanov, being in a state of depression, threw himself out of the window of the 5th floor of an apartment building on Davydkovskaya Street in Moscow. He sustained multiple serious injuries and fractures.

== Filmography ==
=== Cinema ===
- 2008: Dark Planet Part 1 as Maxim Kammerer
- 2009: Dark Planet Part 2 as Maxim Kammerer
- 2012: My Guy - Angel
- 2013: Okolofutbol as speaker
- 2018: Tankers
- 2018: Who's next, Dreamers? as Mark

=== Television ===
- 2011: Insurance Case as Artyom
- 2011: Kiss of Socrates as Kostya
- 2012: Long Тime Рassed as the host
