= Soulless (film) =

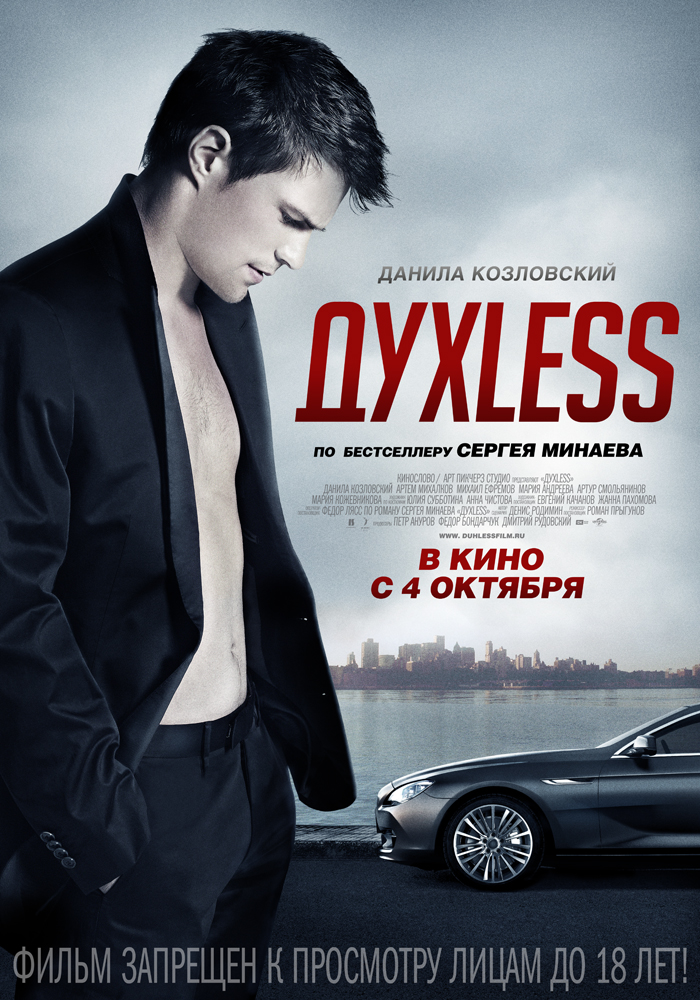
- Film poster
- Directed by: Roman Prygunov
- Screenplay by: Denis Rodimin; Sergey Minaev
- Based on: Soulless: Tale of an Unreal Man by Sergey Minaev
- Produced by: Pyotr Anurov; Dmitry Rudovsky; Fedor Bondarchuk
- Starring: Danila Kozlovsky; Maria Andreeva; Mikhail Efremov; Artur Smolianinov; Artyom Mikhalkov; Maria Kozhevnikova; Sergey Belogolovtsev
- Cinematography: Fedor Lyass
- Music by: Pavel Esenin
- Production companies: Kinoslovo; Art Pictures Studio
- Distributed by: Universal Pictures Russia
- Release date: 4 October 2012
- Running time: 100 minutes
- Country: Russia
- Language: Russian
- Budget: 84 million RUB ($1.3 million)
- Box office: $13,364,412

Dukhless (Russian: Духless) sometimes referred to as Soulless, is a 2012 Russian black comedy-drama film directed by Roman Prygunov and based on the novel Soulless: Tale of an Unreal Man by Sergey Minaev. It was selected as the opening film of the 34th Moscow International Film Festival.

First, the movie was scheduled to be released in Autumn 2011 but was released on 21 June 2012 during the 34th Moscow International Film Festival. The film was screened in theaters on 4 October 2012. The sequel was released on 5 March 2015.

== Plot ==
The film tells a story of a 29-year-old top manager named Max Andreev (Danila Kozlovsky) who is an ambitious achiever of his goals, leading to happiness by earning and spending his money in most lavish ways: expensive luxury cars, penthouse dwellings, night clubs, posh girls, parties and drugs became the attributes of his life.

But one day Max meets a 19-year-old girl named Yulia, a lower-middle-class university student, who has a "McJob" for a living, and who occasionally participates in various social activism groups of Moscow. Realizing that he wasted 10 years of his life away, Max decides to befriend Yulia, and together they live through numerous turning points (peripeteias), shaking and changing both of their lives for the better.

== Cast ==
- Danila Kozlovsky – Max Andreev, top-manager
- Mariya Andreyeva – Yulia, student, activist in "Free Radicals" group
- Artyom Mikhalkov – Vadim, Max's friend
- Nikita Panfilov – Misha Voudu
- Artur Smolyaninov – Avdei, Head of "Free Radicals" group
- Mikhail Efremov – Alexey Alexeyevich Kondratov, Bank Director, Max's boss
- Maria Kozhevnikova – Elvira, model, Max's girlfriend
- Sergei Belogolovtsev – Volodya Gulyakin, Director of Saint Petersburg Branch of the Bank
- Sasha Budro – Alan Garrido, Bank's Vice-president
- Dmitry Dorokhov – Sasha.
- Natalia Samolyotova – Oksana
- Oksana Kutuzova – Alyona Suvorova, former Max's girlfriend
- OIgor Voinarovsky – Parkhomenko
- Anna Naumenko – Katya, Max's secretary
- Alexey Shakhbanov – Kostya
- Marina Kazankova – Natalia Viktorovna, Gulyakin's Vice
- Daniil Vorobyov – Mr. X

== Production ==
Danila Kozlovsky, who played the main role, broke his hand during filming. Despite this, he continued his acting, including difficult parts like night club scenes, dances and intimate scenes. He did such an impeccable job, people who watched the film were not aware of the incident.

== Box office ==
Russia & CIS Countries (666+21 of copy)

	1st week end (4–7.10.2012 г.)	2nd week end (11—14 October 2012)	3rd week end (18—21 October 2012)	4th week end (25—28 October 2012)	5th week end (1–4.11.2012)	6thweek end (8–11.11.2012)
Box office for the week and ($)	$5 200 289	$3 048 973	$1 283 945	$400 577	$118 711	$48 115
Box office for all week and ($)	$5 200 289	$9 965 194	$12 248 902	$13 034 567	$13 550 168	$13 364 412
Viewers for the weekend	671,004	405,245	168,774	54,350	14,584	5,369
All viewers	671,004	1,339,194	1,786,166	1,910,277	1,947,240	

Ukraine (78 of copy)

	1st week end (4–7.10.2012)	2nd week end (11—14 October 2012)	3rd week end (18—21 October 2012)	4th week end (25—28 October 2012)	5th week end (1–4.11.2012)
Box office for the week and ($)	400,321	250,200	112,590	44,964	10,318
Box office for all week and ($)	400,321	800,641	1,007,056	1,028,774	1,052,767
Viewers for the weekend	76,190	47,847	23,255	8,325	2,106
All viewers	76,190	152,745	193,942	203,325	208,952

The film earned during hire in the territory of Russia and the CIS $13 364 412. At cinemas it was seen by nearly 2 million viewers. Interest to the film remained throughout almost all weekends.

== Sequel ==
Dukhless 2 (Russian: Духless 2) premiered on 5 March 2015 in Russian only. It became one of the most successful Russian films of 2015 to date.

The movie is a continuation of the story of Max Andreev, with Kozlovsky, as well as the other actors, reprising their roles. Three years after the events of the first film, Max lives alone on the Indonesian island of Bali, having escaped his former life (including Yulia). His new life is nothing like the old, and Max enjoys it, until eventually he is framed for drug possession on behalf of some shady persona (who later turns out to be one of his former buddies), and is deported to his homeland. Max thus starts living yet another life, which forces him to become a fugitive activist fighting for his rights and the safety of those he loves.

The cast includes Danila Kozlovsky, Maria Andreeva, Dominique Pinon, Vladimir Simonov, Sergei Burunov, Pavel Vorojtsov and Miloš Biković.

The shooting was held in Moscow and on Bali island in Indonesia. Film's budget was 140 million rubles.

== See also ==
- Selfie – a film based on the novel Soulless of the 21st century. Selfie by Sergey Minaev.
