= Non-Stop Production =

- Industry: Motion pictures
- Founded: 2005
- Headquarters: Moscow, Russia
- Key people: Sergey Melkumov
- Products: Motion pictures Television programs
- Website: nonstopkino.ru

Non-Stop Production is a major Russian motion pictures studio founded in 2005 by Sergey Melkumov, a Russian film producer. The company produces movies and TV-series.

== Filmography ==
Year	Production
2005	The 9th Company
2008	The Inhabited Island Part I
2009	The Inhabited Island Part II
2011	Elena
2013	Stalingrad
2013	Devil's Pass
2014	The Adventurers
2014	Leviathan
2016	The Duelist
