= Dukhless 2 =

Soulless 2
- Directed by: Roman Prygunov
- Screenplay by: Sergey Minaev; Fuad Ibrahimbekov; Mikhail Idov; Andrei Ryvkin
- Produced by: Fyodor Bondarchuk; Dmitri Rudovsky; Pyotr Anurov
- Starring: Danila Kozlovsky; Mariya Andreyeva; Miloš Biković
- Cinematography: Pavel Kapinos
- Music by: Pavel Esenin
- Production companies: Kinoslovo; Art Pictures Studio
- Distributed by: Universal Pictures Russia
- Release date: 3 May 2015
- Running time: 107 minutes
- Country: Russia
- Language: Russian
- Budget: $4 million
- Box office: $8 035 201

Dukhless 2 (Russian: Духless 2) sometimes referred to as Soulless 2, is a 2015 Russian drama film directed by Roman Prygunov, sequel to Dukhless.

== Plot ==
Escaping criminal prosecution in Russia, former bank executive manager Maxim Andreev (Danila Kozlovsky) lives in Bali, surfing and enjoying the sun and the ocean. Once he saves a life for an amateur surfer, who turns out to be the young head of the Russian state corporation that finances innovation. In gratitude, Roman (Miloš Biković) offers Max a job in Moscow. When news of this leaks, representatives of the Russian special services who are seeking compromising evidence against the state corporation, seek the expulsion of Andreev to Russia and demand from him that he accepts Roman's proposal and gather material on his boss. Since otherwise he faces a prison, Max reluctantly becomes a "snitch" and again plunges into the world of Moscow's glamour.

== Cast ==
- Danila Kozlovsky as Max Andreev
- Mariya Andreyeva as Yulia
- Miloš Biković as Roman Belkin
- Pavel Vorozhtsov as Savelov
- Aleksandra Bortich as Alyona
- Kristina Babushkina as Oksana Maslova
- Sergey Burunov as Shokhin
- Lev Prygunov as Mikhail Ivanovich
- Vladimir Simonov as Varennikov
- Dominique Pinon as Bernard
- Alexey Fedkin as Beroyev
- Dmitry Podnozov as Viktor Ilyich
- Lyubov Sokolinskaya as Irina Tsifinovets
- Ivan Shishkin as Viktor
- Tatyana Kazantseva as Tatyana, secretary
- Anatoly Dzivaev as Galaktion
- Parulian Panggabean as Indonesia Policeman

== Production ==
The film was shot in Bali and Moscow.

== Awards ==
Danila Kozlovsky won the Nika Award as best actor in 2016.
