= Alexey Steblev =

Russian composer (born 1972)

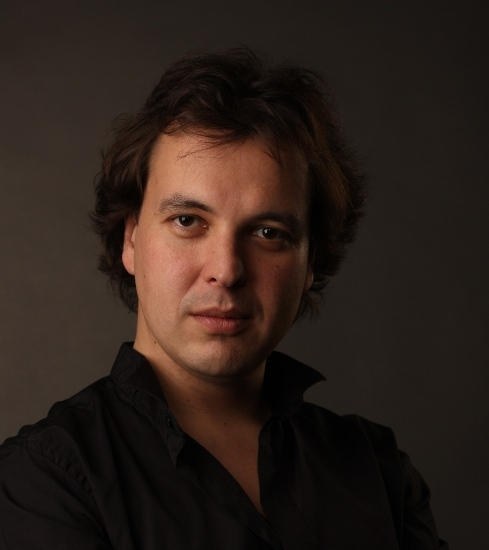
- Born: October 2, 1972 (age 53); Moscow

Alexey Steblev (born October 2, 1972) is a Russian cellist, composer, conductor, and entrepreneur.

== Biography ==
=== Musical career ===
Alexey Steblev graduated from the 'Gnessin School of Music, then studied cello at the Moscow Conservatory. Together with other members of Talan Quartet (later known as Moscow Quartet) he was a student of Valentin Berlinsky. While still in school, Alexey Steblev won the first grand prix at the international contest Concertino Praga. From 1992 to 2003 he was a cellist in Moscow Quartet. With Moscow Quartet he became a winner of international contests in Vienna and Saint-Petersburg, played with Alexander Rudin, Konstantin Lifschitz, Corina Belcea, Norbert Brainin and many others and made three recordings including the complete quartets by Alexander Taneyev on London label Olympia Records and Alexander Gretchaninov on the Swiss label Pan Classics.

In 2002, Alexey Steblev became a soloist of the chamber orchestra Moscow Virtuosi. In 2006, in coauthorship with Petr Klimov, he wrote music to the film The Connection by Dunya Smirnova, and in 2008 and 2011, to two more films by the director: Fathers and Sons (2008) and Two Days (2011).

In 2008, together with Yulia Igonina, Elena Kharitonova and Mikhail Rudoy Alexey Steblev founds the New Russian Quartet. The quartet toured extensively, while remaining in great demand at home – in Russia, they gave at least 25 concerts annually only in Moscow. In December 2010, the Quartet played in Moscow in support of the poll protests demanding re-run of parliamentary elections and an end to Prime Minister Putin's rule.

In 2011, Steblev left Moscow Virtuosi.

Since 2015, Steblev has taught quartet in State Classical Academy Maimonides. He is also a conductor of the academy's orchestra. In 2015, Melodiya Records released the New Russian Quartet's album Cinemaphonia that includes renowned quartets used for various motion pictures soundtracks and Steblev's own piece "Moviemusic for String Quartet".

=== Entrepreneurship ===
From 2002 to 2005, Alexey Steblev was the art director of "Pir O.G.I.", a Moscow network of cafes. He also worked in the venture capital industry: from 2011 to 2013 he was a vice president of business development in Enhanced Spectrometry Inc. and Terasense Inc. He also worked in the venture capital department of Troika Ventures. In 2014-2015 Steblev worked as a manager of distribution network development in Artec Europe; since 2018 – CEO of RDI.Digital platform.

== Compositions ==
=== Film soundtracks ===
- Svyaz (2006) (dir. Avdotya Smirnova);
- Fathers and Sons (2008) (dir. Avdotya Smirnova);
- Two Days (2011) (dir. Avdotya Smirnova);
- Kniga Malgil (2013, short film, dir. Tanya Vigel);
- Suprematism (2014, short film, dir. Nikolay Sheptulin).

=== Discography ===
- 1995 — A.S.Taneev: All string quartets (Talan quartet), Olympia records, UK;
- 1998 — Music for December (music by Anton Batagov for the film Music for December by dir. Ivan Dykhovichny);
- 2001 — Gretchaninov: String Quartets 2 & 4 (with Moscow Quartet), PanClassics, Switzerland;
- 2001 — Strana glukhih (music for the film Country of the Deaf by dir. Valery Todorovsky) (with the ensemble 4'33'' of Alexey Aygi).
- 2009 — Brahms and Reger Clarinet Quintets ( with New Russian Quartet) and Valeriy Gorokholinsky;
- 2015 — Cinemaphonia ( with New Russian Quartet), Melodiya;
- 2016 — Sergey Akhunov. Chamber Works ( with New Russian Quartet);
- 2017 — Quintet+. Chamber music live from Moscow Conservatory hall (with New Russian Quartet, Lyudmila Berlinskaya).

== Links ==
- official webpage of the New Russian Quartet
- Cinemaphonia in Apple Music
