= Two Days (2011 film) =

- Directed by: Avdotya Smirnova
- Written by: Avdotya Smirnova; Anna Parmas
- Produced by: Fyodor Bondarchuk; Dmitri Rudovsky; Ruben Dishdishyan
- Starring: Fyodor Bondarchuk; Kseniya Rappoport
- Cinematography: Maksim Osadchy
- Music by: Alexey Steblev; Pyotr Klimov
- Production companies: Art Pictures Studio; Central Partnership
- Release date: September 8, 2011
- Running time: 90 min.
- Country: Russia
- Language: Russian
- Box office: $609 894

Two Days (Russian: Два дня, romanized: Dva dnya) is a 2011 Russian romantic comedy-drama film directed by Avdotya Smirnova.

== Cast ==
- Fyodor Bondarchuk as Pyotr Drozdov, Deputy Minister of Economy and Development
- Kseniya Rappoport as Maria Ilinichna
- Evgeny Muravich as Vladimir Nikolayevich Ilyin, Director of the Museum
- Irina Rozanova as Larisa Petrovna
- Gennady Smirnov as Victor
- Konstantin Shelestun as Arkady
- Maria Semyonova as Katya
- Andrei Smirnov as Minister
- Olga Dihovichnaya as Lida
- Sergey Umanov as Kharkevich
- Boris Kamorzin as Sergei Ivanovich Begletsov, Governor
- Yuri Pronin as Chief Engineer

== Reception ==
The film received positive reviews.

It was a winner of two Golden Eagle Awards, for Best Actor (Fyodor Bondarchuk) and Best Actress (Kseniya Rappoport).
