= The Warrior (2015 film) =

2015 Russian film

- Theatrical release poster
- Directed by: Alexey Andrianov (rus)
- Screenplay by: Ilya Tilkin
- Based on: Warrior by Cliff Dorfman; Gavin O'Connor
- Produced by: Dmitriy Rudovskiy; Anton Zlatopolskiy (rus); Fyodor Bondarchuk; Elena Nelidova; Yuriy Grachevskiy
- Starring: Sergey Bondarchuk Jr.; Vladimir Yaglych; Fyodor Bondarchuk; Svetlana Khodchenkova
- Cinematography: Vladislav Opelyants
- Edited by: Dmitriy Golovin
- Music by: Fedor Fomin; Artyom Vasilyev
- Production companies: Lionsgate; Art Pictures Studio; All-Russia State Television and Radio Broadcasting Company (VGTRK)
- Distributed by: Lionsgate; Central Partnership
- Release date: October 1, 2015 (Russia)
- Running time: 90 minutes
- Country: Russia
- Language: Russian
- Budget: $1.5 million
- Box office: $3,187,750

The Warrior (Russian: Воин, romanized: Voin) is a 2015 Russian sports drama film directed by Alexey Andrianov, starring Sergey Bondarchuk Jr. and Vladimir Yaglych.

The film tells the story of two brothers, professional mixed martial arts athletes and their father, a fighting coach. The picture's plot bears strong similarity with the 2011 American film of the same name.

The film was released in Russian rental on October 1, 2015 by Central Partnership. The film received three nominations for the Golden Eagle Award: Best Cinematography, Best Film Music and Best Film Editing.

== Plot ==
The film tells the story of two brothers - Roma and Slava, who decide to play in the bouts of the MMA series: Roma wants to help financially the family of his deceased colleague, who was shot by Somali pirates, and Slava is driven by a number of reasons: because of the plight of the family, his wife works as a stripper, and his wages for the utilization of cars are not enough to feed the family and cure a sick daughter who urgently needs an expensive operation.

Slava received a severe trauma to the skull as a child, and if he is hit in the head, he may die. Roma asks his father to become his coach, despite their difficult relationship, due to his alcoholism.

In the ring, Roma and Slava win victories one after another, and become even in the final battle. Slava uses a stifling technique, forcing Roma to surrender. In the final scene of the film Slava's daughter boxes with him, which gives hope that the necessary operation has been performed on her and she is healthy, that all the members of this family are communicating.

== Cast ==
- Sergey Bondarchuk Jr. as Roma Rodin (Russian: Рома Родин, romanized: Roma Roden), younger brother; he is equivalent to Tommy Conlon, who was portrayed by Tom Hardy.
- Vladimir Yaglych as Vyacheslav 'Slava' Rodin (Russian: Вячеслав «Слава» Родин, romanized: Vyacheslav «Slava» Rodin), elder brother; he is equivalent to Brendan Conlon, who was portrayed by Joel Edgerton.
- Fyodor Bondarchuk as Andrey Rodin (Russian: Андрей Родин, romanized: Andrey Rodin), father of Roma and Slava; he is equivalent to Paddy Conlon, who was portrayed by Nick Nolte.
- Svetlana Khodchenkova as Ekaterina 'Katya' Rodina (Russian: Екатерина «Катя» Родина, romanized: Yekaterina «Katya» Rodina), Slava's wife; she is equivalent to Tess Conlon, who was portrayed by Jennifer Morrison.
- Ulyana Kulikova as Natasha Rodina (Russian: Наташа Родина, romanized: Natasha Rodina), Katya and Slava's daughter
- Yury Yakovlev-Sukhanov as Kostya (Russian: Костя, romanized: Kostya), Roma's trainer; he is equivalent to Colt Boyd, who was portrayed by Maximiliano Hernández.
- Aleksandr Novin as Tosha (Russian: Тоша, romanized: Tosha), Slava's trainer; he is equivalent to Frank Campana, who was portrayed by Frank Grillo.
- Aleksandr Baluev as Kulikov (Russian: Куликов, romanized: Kulikov), TV presenter
- Batu Khasikov as cameo
- Kamil Hajiyev as cameo
- Vladimir Sychev as businessman
- Mikhail Vodzumi as Vaughn (Russian: Вон, romanized: Von)
- Maria Andreyeva as Dana (Russian: Дана, romanized: Dana)
- Vladimir Selivanov as Amundsen (Russian: Амундсен, romanized: Amundsen)
- Alla Yuganova as Masha (Russian: Маша, romanized: Masha)
- Aleksey Faddeev as sergeant

== Production ==
Regarding the comparison of the film with the 2011 American film Warrior, Fyodor Bondarchuk answered:

It seems to me that these are two different films, two different souls. But we understand that there will be comparisons, and we went for this experiment. In addition, it is an explosive mixture of various literary materials collected around the world.

According to the film's producer Dmitriy Rudovskiy, the plot film is close to the American film Warrior, but is based on the original script “Taste for Blood” by David Frigerio, the rights to which were bought by the movie company Art Pictures Studio.

=== Filming ===
Filming took place in Kaliningrad and the surrounding area (Baltiysk, Yantarny, Svetlogorsk), as well as in Moscow.

The film was shot in 33 days. Eight battles of the tournament were filmed in four days.

== Release ==
The film was released in Russia on October 1, 2015 by Central Partnership.
