= Selfie (2018 film) =

2017 film by Nikolay Khomeriki

- Directed by: Nikolay Khomeriki
- Screenplay by: Sergey Minaev
- Produced by: Pyotr Anurov; Fyodor Bondarchuk; Dmitry Rudovsky
- Starring: Konstantin Khabenskiy; Feodor Bondarchuk; Yulia Khlynina; Anna Mikhalkova; Severija Janušauskaitė
- Cinematography: Vladislav Opelyants
- Production company: Art Pictures Studio
- Distributed by: Walt Disney Studios Sony Pictures Releasing (WDSSPR)
- Release date: February 1, 2018 (Russia)
- Country: Russia
- Language: Russian
- Budget: $2 million
- Box office: $4 148 110

Selfie (Russian: Селфи) is a 2018 Russian drama film directed by Nikolay Khomeriki and starring Konstantin Khabensky and Feodor Bondarchuk. The film is based on the novel Soulless of the 21st Century: Selfie by Sergey Minaev. The picture was released on 1 February 2018.

== Plot ==
Popular writer and TV presenter Vladimir Bogdanov is replaced with a doppelgänger who takes Bogdanov's job, fame, wife, and mistress, and handles his role much better than the original. Only Bogdanov's daughter can help him regain control of his life.

== Cast ==
- Konstantin Khabensky — Vladimir Bogdanov
- Feodor Bondarchuk — Max
- Yulia Khlynina — Zhanna
- Anna Mikhalkova — Vika
- Severija Janušauskaitė — Lera

== Marketing ==
For its February issue Esquire Russia placed Konstantin Khabensky's selfie on the cover. It was the first time that a Russian magazine was published with a cover shot on an iPhone.

== Reception ==
=== Box office ===
The film was a Russian box-office leader of the February 1–4 weekend — the film collected 125.1 million rubles.

=== Critical response ===
The film received mixed reviews. Khabensky's acting and cinematography by Opelyants received considerable praise, but many reviewers have criticized the screenplay.

== See also ==
- Soulless – a 2012 film written by Sergey Minaev
- The Double – an 1846 novella by Fyodor Dostoyevsky
