= Soldiers of Fortune (2012 film) =

- Film poster
- Directed by: Maksim Korostyshevsky
- Written by: Alexandre Coscas; Robert Crombie; Joe Kelbley
- Produced by: Robert Crombie; Jeff Most; Richard Salvatore
- Starring: Christian Slater; Sean Bean; Ving Rhames; Dominic Monaghan; James Cromwell
- Cinematography: Masha Solovyova
- Edited by: Timothy Alverson; Igor Litoninskiy; Danny Saphire
- Music by: Joseph LoDuca; Michael Tavera
- Production companies: Highbridge Productions; Globus Films
- Distributed by: Roadside Attractions
- Release date: August 3, 2012 (United States)
- Running time: 94 minutes
- Countries: Russia; United States
- Language: English
- Box office: $1.5 million

Soldiers of Fortune is a 2012 action film directed by Maksim Korostyshevsky and starring Christian Slater, Dominic Monaghan, Sean Bean, James Cromwell and Ving Rhames. It was shot in Ukraine.

== Plot ==
United States special forces captains Craig McCenzie and Mike Reed are attempting to find Osama bin Laden in an unspecified location in the Middle East. Their mission goes awry when CIA operative Carter Mason turns up independently, blowing Reed's cover in the settlement he's infiltrated. He's captured by the locals and interrogated by Mason, who threatens to emasculate him if he doesn't disclose the full details of his operation. Reed is rescued by McCenzie without disclosing any information.

Four years later, Mason has orchestrated the dishonorable discharges of McCenzie and Reed, who now operate a private security firm in the United States. McCenzie attends a biker gang-run poker tournament to generate revenue for their struggling business, but when other players draw guns on the dealer, he learns the game was a set up designed to test his combat skills. He's offered a well-paying job aiding freedom fighters on a tiny, dictator-controlled European island. When he learns Mason leads the dictator's repressive military, he accepts and takes Reed to a base camp close to the island where they are briefed. The poorly funded freedom fighters are sourcing money though a war tourism venture called Soldiers of Fortune that invites wealthy foreigners to pay for admission to their ranks in exchange for a thrilling, tax deductible experience. To safeguard the war tourists' lives, McCenzie and Reed have been hired to act as tour guides and bodyguards. Their five charges (Roman St. John, Sam Haussmann, Grimaud Tourneur, Tommy Sin and Charles Herbert Vanderbeer) are self-made millionaires who believe themselves up to the task of professional soldiering. The recruits, with the exception of St. John, do poorly in the ad hoc training provided by Reed and McCenzie, but gain a functional understanding of weaponry.

On their first mission, the tourists and their escorts are ambushed, resulting in Reed's death. McCenzie leads the five to safety and accuses Tourneur of arranging the ambush. Tourneur, a black market weapons dealer, reveals he sold the weapons to the dictator but was never paid, and has come to the island for revenge. The group return to base and discuss their motivations. Sin's psychiatrist suggested his addiction to violent video games left him disconnected to reality, and feels the experience will gain him a truer understanding of the world.

Further treachery leads to a morning attack on the encampment, and though the tourists escape, they're exposed to the full horrors of war. McCenzie returns to the camp to save the life of Cecilia, the woman who originally recruited him, but the tourists snipe at the attacking troops, drawing fire which apparently kills Vanderbeer. St. John directs them to a helipad attached to a mine complex. His obvious knowledge of the terrain forces him to reveal he is a mineral-trading native of the island who has returned to obtain the rare and valuable metal coltan. McCenzie converses privately with Cecilia and the remaining four are captured after launching an assault by themselves. They're reunited with Vanderbeer in prison, and realise he is the traitor who informed Mason of the rebels' location in exchange for money to replace a fortune lost to the stock market.

McCenzie and Cecilia rescue the men and they split up. McCenzie engages Mason while, Sin and Tourneur ambush Vanderbeer, and St. John flees the compound while Cecilia flees on a jet-ski. Haussmann sacrifices his life to hold off the rest of the dictator's private army, fulfilling his own motivation to die heroically, preventing his wife from gaining half of his assets in a pending divorce settlement. Sin kills Vanderbeer, McCenzie avenges himself on Mason, Cecilia defeats the dictator's daughter while St. John abandons his escape to save Cecilia from the floating wreckage. Tourneur wraps up the final loose end by killing the dictator with a well-aimed bazooka shot. As the island's inhabitants celebrate their liberation, the five survivors toast Haussmann's sacrifice.

== Cast ==
- Christian Slater as Captain Craig James McCenzie
- Sean Bean as Dimidov / Roman St. John
- James Cromwell as Sam Haussmann
- Ving Rhames as Grimaud "Grim Reaper" Tourneur
- Dominic Monaghan as Tommy Sin
- Charlie Bewley as Charles Herbert Vandebeer
- Oksana Korostyshevskaya as Cecilia
- Freddy Rodriguez as Captain Mike Reed
- Ryan Donowho as Ernesto
- Colm Meaney as Carter Mason
- Gennadi Vengerov as Colonel Lupo
- Sarah Ann Schultz as Magda
- Shawn Parsons as The Pitchman

== Box office ==
The film was given a limited release on just 50 screens with minimal marketing in the United States. After 2 weeks it ended its cinema run with a box office result of $38,898. The film was more successful in the Russia-CIS market, where it was released on 500 screens and earned $1,542,287 at the box office and in the United Arab Emirates where it earned $203,101 at the box office.

== Critical reception ==
The review aggregator website Rotten Tomatoes reported a 14% approval rating with an average rating of 3.29/10, based on an aggregation of seven reviews. On Metacritic, the film achieved an average score of 19 out of 100 based on 5 reviews, signifying "Overwhelming dislike".

The Hollywood Reporter issued an extremely negative review, where on can read: "yet another B-movie that wastes the talents of an estimable cast. (...) this is a film so bad that not only was it not screened in advance for critics, its publicists wouldn’t even provide background information."

== Television series ==
A loose spin-off series, Professionals, starring Brendan Fraser, Tom Welling and Elena Anaya, was broadcast for 10 episodes, from November 23 – December 21, 2020 The series was created by Jeff Most and Michael Colleary. Each season is intended to star Tom Welling as Vincent Corbo protecting a new client, with the first season's client being Brendan Fraser as Peter Swann.
