= Actress (2007 film) =

2007 Russian comedy film

- Directed by: Stanislav Govorukhin
- Written by: Valery Muharyamov
- Produced by: Yekaterina Maskina
- Starring: Yevgenia Dobrovolskaya; Yuri Stepanov; Maria Aronova; Dmitry Pevtsov; Alexander Abdulov; Fyodor Bondarchuk
- Cinematography: Valery Myulgaut
- Music by: Eugen Doga
- Production company: Vertikal
- Release date: 2007
- Running time: 100 minutes
- Country: Russia
- Language: Russian

Actress (Russian: Артистка, romanized: Artistka) is a 2007 Russian comedy film directed by Stanislav Govorukhin.

== Plot ==
The story revolves around Anna who is a young divorced women. She is a theater actress, who's unsatisfied with the minor roles offered to her. Loneliness surrounds her life. One day Anna meets an interesting man with who she falls in love. She is soon forced to choose between her career and love, when she's offered a lead role.

== Cast ==
- Yevgenia Dobrovolskaya as Аnnа
- Yuri Stepanov as Vikenty
- Mariya Aronova as neighbor
- Dmitry Pevtsov as neighbor
- Alexander Abdulov as Bosyakin
- Fyodor Bondarchuk as film director
- Mikhail Yefremov as Gusyatnikov
- Svetlana Nemolyaeva as theater actress
- Irina Skobtseva as Varvara Fominichna, Vikenty's mother
- Kira Golovko as Iraida Eduardovna
