= Battalion (2015 film) =

- Russian: Батальонъ
- Directed by: Dmitry Meskhiev
- Produced by: Igor Ugolnikov
- Starring: Mariya Aronova; Maria Kozhevnikova; Marat Basharov
- Cinematography: Ilya Averbakh
- Music by: Yuri Poteyenko
- Production companies: Corner-Work; Art Pictures Studio
- Distributed by: Walt Disney Studios Sony Pictures Releasing CIS (Note: Distributed under the Columbia Pictures banner.)
- Release date: 20 February 2015 (Russia)
- Running time: 120 minutes
- Country: Russia
- Language: Russian
- Budget: $ 10,000,000

Battalion (Russian: Батальонъ, Batal'on) is a 2015 Russian war film directed by Dmitry Meskhiev that relates the story of the First Battalion of Death, a women-only Russian combat unit that fought in the First World War. Actress Mariya Aronova plays the role of real-life heroine Maria Bochkareva. Battalion was the biggest winner at the 2015 Golden Eagle Awards, winning four awards out of nine nominations.

== Plot ==
In the Spring of 1917, following the February Revolution, Russian troops fighting in the First World War are heavily demoralised. Military commanders decide to create a battalion of enthusiastic women volunteers, led by Maria Bochkareva. After basic military training, the women are sent to the front.

== Cast ==
- Mariya Aronova as Maria Bochkareva
- Maria Kozhevnikova as Natalia Tatishcheva
- Marat Basharov as Alexander Kerensky
- Irina Rakhmanova as Froska
- Yanina Malinchik as Dusya
- Yevgeny Dyatlov as Tseplyaev
- Valeria Shkirando as Vera Neklyudova
- Dmitry Shevchenko as Peter Polovtsov
- Vladimir Zaytsev as General Alekseev
- Mila Makarova as Tonya

== Release ==
Battalion led the number of nominations at the 2015 Golden Eagle Awards. It lost Best Motion Picture to Anna Melikian's Pro Lyubov, but nevertheless won 4 awards: Best Actress in a Supporting Role for Maria Kozhevnikova, Best Music Score, Best Editing and Best Sound Editing.

In March 2016, a longer version of the film, split into 4 episodes, was broadcast on Russian television.
