= Mariya Kozhevnikova =

Russian actress and politician

- Мария Кожевникова
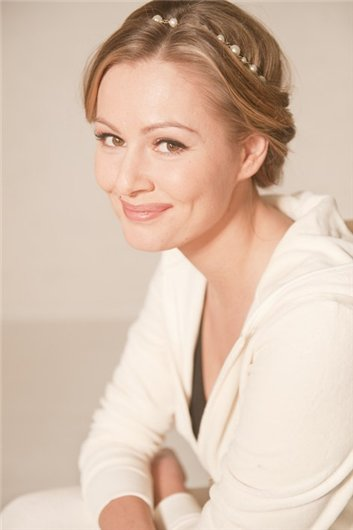
- Portrait of State Duma deputy Mariya Kozhevnikova.
- Born: Mariya Aleksandrovna Kozhevnikova; November 14, 1984 (age 41); Moscow, Russian SFSR, Soviet Union
- Occupations: Actress, politician
- Years active: 2004 – present
- Height: 1.73 m (5 ft 8 in)
- Spouse: Yevgeny Vasilyev
- Children: 3

Mariya Aleksandrovna Kozhevnikova (Russian: Мари́я Алекса́ндровна Коже́вникова; born November 14, 1984) is a Russian actress and politician.

Kozhevnikova was voted the hottest woman in Russia in November 2011. She was a Deputy of the State Duma of the Russian Federation (2011–2016).

== Early life and career ==
Kozhevnikova was born in 1984, in the family of a Soviet hockey player, two-time Olympic champion, Merited Master of Sports Alexander Kozhevnikov and English teacher Margarita Kozhevnikova.

Kozhevnikova's grandfather, Major General, participant of the Great Patriotic War Valentin Nikolaevich Trofimov (1923-2013).

Kozhevnikova has a brother and a sister.

Kozhevnikova is the "Master of Sports" in rhythmic gymnastics, champion of Moscow. Graduated from the RATI-GITIS in 2006.

In 2001, when Kozhevnikova was only a teenager, she starred in the video for the song "You Will Become An Adult" by the Lyceum group. In 2002, Kozhevnikova chose RATI-GITIS to participate in the Love Stories music group. In 2005, while studying at the institute, she began her career as an actress, participating in extras and playing secondary roles.

Kozhevnikova is known for her role in the Russian TV series "Univer".

In September 2009, the Playboy magazine published eight photographs of Kozhevnikova, in five of which she is completely naked.

== Personal life ==
At the end of August 2013, Kozhevnikova and her boyfriend at the time, businessman Yevgeny Vasilyev, got married in St. Nicholas Cathedral in Nice, France. The official registration of the marriage did not take place, which means that they are not officially married at the moment.

Kozhevnikova has three children, all of them are boys.

Her first son Ivan was born in January 2014.

Since May 2018, Ukraine imposed sanctions on Kozhevnikova.

On August 30, 2023, Kozhevnikova announced her fourth pregnancy. 25 September 2023, she gave birth to her fourth son.

== Filmography ==
=== Films ===
List of film credits
Year	Title	Role
2007	The Sovereign's Servant	courtier
2007	Three And Snowflake	Blonde model in a gray fur coat
2008	Dhaam Dhoom	Anna
2010	Dark World	Vika
2011	Wedding Exchange	Kristina
2012	Soulless	model Elvira
2013	Treasure Lake Kaban	Dayana Jones
2014	Battalion	Natalia Tatishcheva
2014	Andiamo a quel paese	
2015	A Warrior's Tail	Savva's mother (voice)
2015	Sports Without Borders	Nadezhda Smirnova
2018	Sobibor	

=== TV series ===
List of television credits
Year	Title	Role
2004 - 2012	Lawyer	Katya, secretary
2005	Rublyovka Live	
2006 - 2008	Who Is The Master In The House?	
2006 - 2007	She-wolf	Olesya
2006	Hello, I'm Your Father	Nastya
2007	Trial column	the girl on the machine
2007	Matchmaker	
2007	Dance ...	Stasya
2007	The Yellow Dragon (mini-series)	Yana
2007	The right to happiness	Liza
2007	Love On The Cutting Edge (mini-series)	Dasha, a friend of Laura
2007	Goodbye, Doctor Chekhov!	Kotik
2008	And Nevertheless I Love...	Barbi, a prostitute in a brothel
2008	God's Gift	Lena, nurse
2008	Two sisters	Irina
2008	Heartbreakers	Lika Zernova
2008 - 2011	Univer	Alla Grishko
2008	Girl	Dina, friend Toma
2008 - 2009	My favorite Witch	Olesya
2008	Borodin. The Return Of The General	Irina Krokhaleva
2008	GIBDD etc.	Rita
2008	Daughter	
2008	Five Steps Over the Clouds (mini-series)	girl leading
2009 - 2010	Kremlin cadets	Anna Prokhorova
2010	A gift of fate	Nastya
2010	Cool guys	
2010	Once in Babenov-Babene	
2011, 2015, 2019	Kto khochet stat' millionerom?	Celebrity contestant
2012 - 2015	Sklifosovsky	Anya, nurse
2012	Newlyweds	Katya
2013	Red mountain	Zhenya
2014	Parrot Club	Tanya (voice)
2014	I believe I do not believe	Vasilisa Kremneva
2026	Univer 15 Years later	Alla Grishko

== Political activity ==
According to Komsomolskaya Pravda, in 2011 Kozhevnikova joined the Young Guard of United Russia (MGER).

In the same year, she was a member and “trusted representative” of the All-Russia People’s Front (ONF). She also served as a member of the Public Council of MGER.

In July 2011, she was nominated as a State Duma candidate from the ONF and took part in the United Russia primaries in Tomsk.

On 1 October 2011, she became a member of the board of trustees of Orphanage No. 39 in Zelenogradskiy, Pushkinsky District, Moscow Oblast.

In December 2011, she was elected as a deputy of the State Duma of the VI convocation from the political party United Russia. She was a member of the State Duma Committee on Culture. She was one of the initiators of draft law No. 292521-6 “On Amendments to Legislative Acts of the Russian Federation on the Protection of Intellectual Rights in Information and Telecommunication Networks,” which restricted users and websites from using materials infringing copyright.

Between October 2011 and May 2016, she co-authored 105 legislative initiatives and amendments to draft federal laws.

In 2014, she ranked 88th in the list of “100 Most Influential Women in Russia” compiled by Ogonyok magazine, Echo of Moscow radio station, and the Interfax news agency.

In 2016, Kozhevnikova once again ran for the State Duma of the VII convocation as a candidate from United Russia but was not elected. Her term expired in October 2016.

In 2017, at the invitation of Krasnogorsk city head Radiy Khabirov, she became a member of the Public Chamber of Krasnogorsk. In 2020, she was reappointed for a new term.
