= Dark Planet (2008 film) =

- A Russian theatrical release poster
- Directed by: Fyodor Bondarchuk
- Written by: Marina and Sergey Dyachenko (screenplay); Strugatsky brothers (novel)
- Produced by: Alexander Rodnyansky; Sergei Melkumov
- Starring: Vasiliy Stepanov; Yuliya Snigir; Pyotr Fyodorov; Aleksei Serebryakov; Fyodor Bondarchuk
- Narrated by: Gennadi Vengerov
- Cinematography: Maksim Osadchy
- Edited by: Igor Litoninsky
- Music by: Yuriy Poteenko (original music); Pavel Doreuli (sound effects)
- Distributed by: Art Pictures Studio; Non-Stop Production; STS
- Release dates: 18 December 2008 (part I); 23 April 2009 (part II)
- Running time: 115 minutes (part I); 100 minutes (part II)
- Country: Russia
- Language: Russian
- Budget: $36.6 million (both parts)

Dark Planet (original Russian title: Обитаемый остров, romanized: Obitaemyy ostrov, lit. 'The Inhabited Island') is a two-part Russian science fiction film directed by Fyodor Bondarchuk. The film was adapted by Marina and Sergey Dyachenko from the 1969 novel by Arkady and Boris Strugatsky of the same Russian name, published in English as Prisoners of Power; a part of the Noon Universe series. It is a dystopian story set on post-apocalyptic planet Saraksh, ruled by a totalitarian regime that brainwashes its citizens. Maxim Kammerer, a space explorer from Earth, crash-lands on Saraksh and becomes involved in the planet's everboiling politics. The movie was released as two separate films, in December 2008 and April 2009, respectively.

The film was met with mixed reviews. It was praised for its visual style, social commentary and being faithful to the original novel, but also criticized for its direction, editing, and casting. Dark Planet was made with one of the largest budgets for Russian cinema at the time and despite huge box office earnings and DVD sales the movie was considered a financial disappointment.

== Plot summary ==
=== Part I ===
Year 2157. Maxim Kammerer (Stepanov), a space explorer from Earth, crash lands on an unknown planet. His ship is destroyed, and now he's stuck there "like Robinson on an uninhabited island" (hence the title). Maxim encounters local military police, who do not believe Maxim is alien and send him to mental hospital in the capital. Guy Gaal (Fyodorov), a corporal of the Guards, is assigned to escort Maxim.

Maxim learns that the name of the planet is Saraksh, and the country where he landed is called Fatherland, because it is ruled by a militaristic dictatorship of the Unknown Fathers. Strider (Serebryakov), a powerful figure in the government, wants to see the newcomer; he sends one of his men, Funk, after Maxim, but as they drive the street, Funk suffers from what seems to be an epileptic seizure, and Maxim is left alone. He encounters Rada Gaal (Snigir), the sister of Guy, falls in love with her and stays with the Gaals. Guy talks Maxim into becoming a privateer ("candidate") in the Guards. They are forced to participate in brutal raids against the people called "degenerates" by state propaganda. After Maxim refuses to execute a group of captured "degenerates", Guards commander Rittmeister Chachu shoots him and leaves him to his apparent death.

However, Maxim survives and joins a group of rebel "degenerates". During his time with the rebels, Maxim learns the true nature of the regime and the purpose of towers erected across the country. Contrary to state propaganda, the towers function as mind control devices, sending a special kind of radiation that ensures the citizens' loyalty to the regime. Twice in a day, the majority of people experience a patriotic frenzy, while minority, the "degenerates", are able to resist brainwashing, but they suffer from intense pain and convulsions. The Unknown Fathers themselves are known to be "degenerates" (this is highlighted by Funk's "epilepsy" earlier). Maxim realises that rebels are hiding the truth just as the government does, in hope that they might use the towers themselves, had they come to power.

After fighting alongside the "degenerates" in the attack on a tower, Maxim is again captured by the military and sentenced to a prison labor camp. There, inmates are tasked with cleaning the wilderness of automated defense systems that were left abandoned by decades of war. On a mission, Maxim manages to capture a tank. He drives the tank away from detention zone across the minefield, picks up Guy, and heads south to the neighbouring nations.

=== Part II ===
The second part is named Rebellion (Russian: Схватка, romanized: Skhvatka, lit. 'Skirmish'). It starts with a brief description of the first part plot.

Maxim reveals the true purpose of the towers to Guy, who does not believe at first but is convinced when his enthusiasm fades as they get farther from the towers. They arrive in a city ruined by atomic bombing and inhabited by mutants. Maxim tries to convince mutants to start a rebellion against the Unknown Fathers, but, being too weak, they refuse. Maxim then decides to seek help from another powerful country on Saraksh, the Islands Empire. Mutants give Maxim a bomber airship to fly for the Empire.

As Guy and Maxim travel the airship, Guy is again hit by the towers' radiation. He starts hysterically screaming of his loyalty to Maxim and hugging him. To stop it, Maxim collides the airship into the Tower and destroys it. After crash-landing at the shore, Maxim and Guy discover an abandoned Imperial White Submarine. There, they find evidence that Islands Empire is an even worse mass-murdering fascist regime which would not help their goals.

Meanwhile, the Unknown Fathers are planning an invasion of the neighbouring country of Khonti. As soon as Maxim and Guy return to Fatherland, they are captured and sent to war along with fellow prisoners, where Guy is killed in action. Funk, following Strider's orders, finds Maxim and takes him out of the war back to the capital. Fatherland is defeated, and the State prosecutor, who was an active supporter of the war, realizes that the Unknown Fathers will execute him for failure. He contacts Maxim and reveals the location of the Tower Control Center, urging him to use it for a coup d'état. Maxim sneaks in, but instead of following the prosecutor's plan, he blasts the Center with explosives.

As he exits the Center, he is confronted by an angry Strider. He berates and beats Maxim and reveals himself as undercover spy from Earth. Maxim, a well-intentioned amateur, ruined the plan to save Fatherland and the rest of the planet that Strider has been preparing for decades. Strider tells Maxim to fly home to Earth. Maxim refuses and offers his help on one condition: another brainwashing center can never be built. After a fight and a heated argument, Strider reluctantly agrees. The final sequence shows rebels overthrowing the Unknown Fathers.

== Cast ==
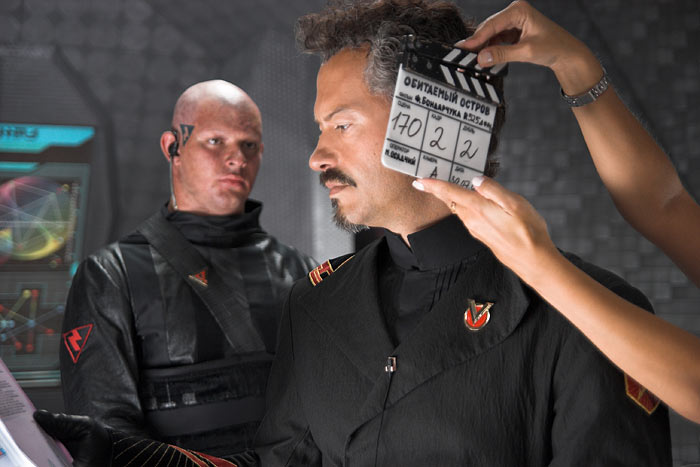
Bondarchuk as Umnik

The Unknown Fathers use nicknames, most of which are terms for different family relations.

- Vasiliy Stepanov as Maxim Kammerer (voiced by Maksim Matveyev)
- Yuliya Snigir as Rada Gaal
- Pyotr Fyodorov as Guy Gaal
- Aleksei Serebryakov as Strider aka Rudolf Sikorski
- Fyodor Bondarchuk as State prosecutor aka Umnik (Smart One)
- Sergey Garmash as Zef
- Gosha Kutsenko as Veper
- Andrei Merzlikin as Fank
- Mikhail Yevlanov as Rittmeister Chachu
- Anna Mikhalkova as Ordi Tader
- Sergei Barkovsky as Nolle Renadu
- Aleksey Gorbunov as Shurin (Brother-in-law (wife's brother))
- Maksim Sukhanov as Dad (Russian: Папа, romanized: Papa)
- Yuriy Tsurilo as the general
- Aleksandr Feklistov as Dever (Brother in law (husband's brother))
- Kirill Pirogov as Svyokor (Father in law (husband's father))
- Yevgeni Sidikhin as Teste (Father in law (wife's father))
- Sergei Mazayev as Voldyr
- Leonid Gromov as Gramenau
- Vasili Savinov as Lesnik
- Vyacheslav Razbegaev as Krysolov
- Dimash Akhimov as Behemoth
- Ignat Akrachkov as prosecutor's referent
- Anton Eskin as Oreshnik

== Production ==
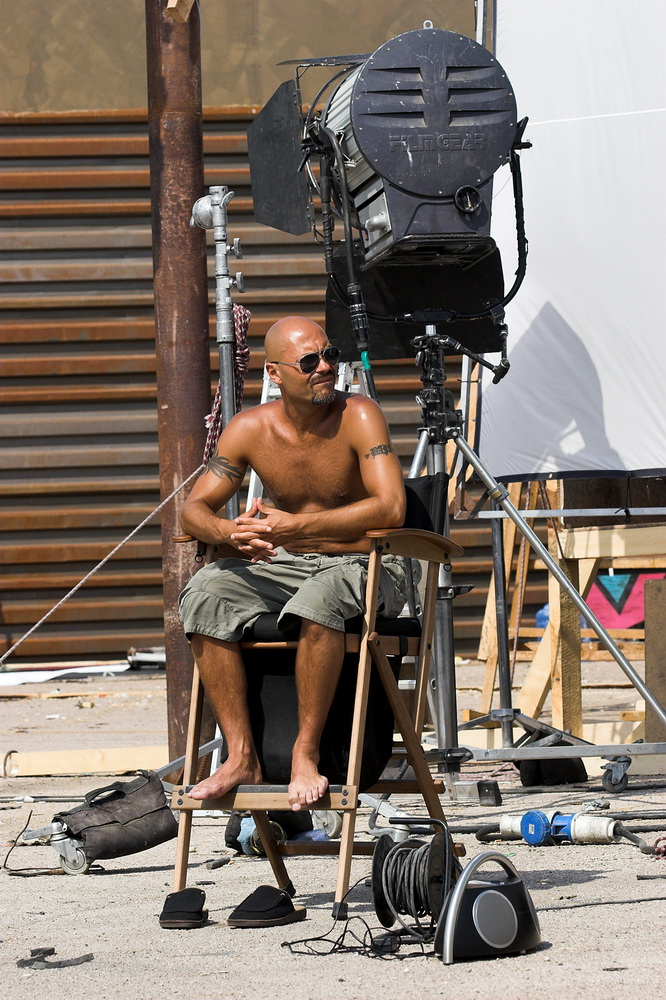
Bondarchuk at the movie set

The film is a production of Art Pictures Studio, Non-Stop Production and STS channel, with special effects by EyeScream Studio, Main Road Post and Quantum Creation FX.

The production was filmed in Crimea, Ukraine, with photography lasting for 10 months (14 February – 7 December 2007). The film had a total budget of about $36.6 million, including $10 million for the film's promotion and $1 million of state donations.

== Reception ==
Dark Planet was met with mixed reviews. According to Russian review aggregator Kritikanstvo, both parts hold an approximate approval rating around 6 of 10, based on 20 reviews. Many critics praised the film for being surprisingly faithful to the novel. Some praised the film's visual effects and action, while others criticized the work of the director and editor. A Mir Fantastiki review called the film a "chaotic mash of visual, dramatical and musical components, each of which separately has quite high quality". "As a result, the film is scattered throughout a sequence of "beautiful pictures" that do not shape an integrated view of the world", agrees Total DVD. Vasiliy Stepanov's acting as Maxim was met with criticism, but some of the supporting actors, such as Serebryakov and Garmash, were praised.

The film was not commercially successful. Despite grossing around $30 million from two parts together and ranking among the top-grossing films of Russia's modern cinema, it did not repay its budget of $36 million. The movie was released for home video very shortly after it exited theatres. According to Bondarchuk, this helped the film to become profitable eventually.

Boris Strugatsky, the only one of the book's co-authors who lived to see the film, said the film is a "directors' success", noting its faithfulness to the novel. He praised the work of Serebryakov (Strider), Bondarchuk (Prosecutor General) and Garmash (Zef), but expressed disappointment over the work of Kutsenko (Vepr'), Mikhalkova (Ordi Tader) and Merzlikin (Funk). He noted Stepanov as one of the biggest successes of the film, saying that "Maxim Kammerer is exactly as we imagined him".

== Release ==
Due to the length of the story, the film was split in two parts: the first premiered on 18 December 2008 and the second on 23 April 2009. Bulldog Film Distribution released the film in February 2015, on 9 February as video on demand and on 16 February 2015 on DVD in the UK.
