= A Warrior's Tail =

2015 Russian animated fantasy adventure film

- Directed by: Maxim Fadeev
- Screenplay by: Aleksandr Chistyakov; Maksim Fadeev; Gregory Poirier
- Produced by: Aleksandr Chistyakov; Dmitriy Rudovskiy; Fyodor Bondarchuk
- Starring: Russian Version: Maksim Chukharyov; Konstantin Khabensky; Maria Kozhevnikova; Fyodor Bondarchuk; Mikhail Galustyan; Natalya Ionova; Yulia Savicheva; English Dub; Milla Jovovich; Will Chase; Sharon Stone; Whoopi Goldberg; Jim Cummings; Joe Pesci
- Edited by: Yuliya Pisarenko
- Music by: Maxim Fadeev
- Production companies: Art Pictures Studio; Glukoza Production
- Distributed by: Signature Entertainment
- Release dates: 12 November 2015 (Russia); 26 December 2016 (United States)
- Running time: 85 Minutes
- Country: Russia
- Languages: Russian; English
- Budget: 1 billion RUB
- Box office: 94.1 million RUB

A Warrior's Tail, also known as Savva: Heart of the Warrior or Hero Quest (Russian: Савва. Сердце воина), is a 2015 Russian animated adventure film directed by Maxim Fadeev and first released in the UK on 1 April 2016. Its English language cast includes Milla Jovovich as Savva, Will Chase as Anggee/Prince Angacetus, Joe Pesci as Komar and Whoopi Goldberg as Mom Jozee.

== Plot ==
A mother tells her young son, Savva, a bed-time story of White Wolves who once protected their human village. Though the wolves disappeared mysteriously many years ago, it is fabled that a warrior will one day save their village.

Soon after, the village is attacked by hyenas who capture the humans to be sold as slaves to Mom-Jozee, the three headed monkey queen. Savva is the only one to escape, thanks to the help of a white wolf named Anggee that suddenly appeared. Anggee offers to take Savva with him to a magician he is going to visit, as there will be a warrior there who can save the village, but they will have to pass through the land of the monkeys. Savva agrees and they soon encounter a small pink creature named Puffy who insists on joining their band, as he too is seeking the magician so that he can be turned back into a prince. They then save an ugly creature/man named Fafl from monkeys, who also claims to be a once-handsome semi-baron who was cursed with ugliness by a witch, as well as to be permanently accompanied by the Mosquito King (who sits on his shoulder) until they agree on something (which is unlikely, seeing as they can't stand each other). Mom-Jozee orders her spies to follow the band passing through her territory.

Puffy is kidnapped by natives who live in a nearby swamp, believing him to be the incarnation of their god, Makatunga. The tribe then captures the rest of the group, originally to kill them, but then frees them. They learn that the Shaman of the tribe, Shisha, had previously used his magic to partially break Anggee's curse, allowing him to become a white wolf again. Shisha also tells Savva that the tribe intends to help Makatunga return to heaven by killing him. Savva rescues Puffy from the temple but are followed by Nanty, Shisha's granddaughter, who has a mutual attraction to Savva and asks to join them.

That night Nanty witnesses Anggee sneak away and transform into a Rickie, human-like creatures that are enemies of humans and most other races. Savva doesn't forgive Anggee for lying to him but is then kidnapped by another Rickie on the orders of Anggee's father. Mom-Jozee, learning that the Rickies are actually the white wolves, declares war on the Rickies so that they can never again become white wolves.

Anggee returns to the Rickie kingdom and confronts his father, the king, about his plan to undo their curse by visiting the Magician. The king tells his son he has no desire to become a white wolf again and refuses to help, but agrees to let Savva go. After everyone regroups Anggee explains to them the story of how, during a time of famine, his father (while they were still white wolves) had attacked a human. As a result all the white wolves were cursed to be Rickies, and because they believed themselves to be powerful, they were cursed to fear one of the smallest animals in the forest, mosquitoes, that can kill Rickies with a single bite.

As the monkey army approaches the group is joined by the natives and the Rickies, sent by Anggee's father after learning the monkeys had declared war. Before the battle, Nanty uses her magic to sharpen Savva's sword. As the two armies clash Mom Jozee attempts to send a swarm of mosquitoes onto the Rickies. Anggee's father joins the battle riding a giant dragon. Fafl is forced to agree with the Mosquito King that only he can stop the swarm, freeing the Mosquito King and allowing him to command the swarm to instead attack the monkeys.

After the battle Savva and the group finally reach the magician's home atop a mountain in a house that walks on two legs. The magician, who is actually a little girl, grants everyone's requests. Fafl returns to his original appearance and is granted the title of full-baron. Anggee and the Rickies (except his father, who was happy being a Rickie) become white wolves again. Puffy, who wasn't actually a cursed prince, desires nothing, explaining that he only wanted friends. Nanty also says that she has everything she needs. Savva is directed to another room to find the warrior but all he finds is his reflection in a mirror, causing him to realise he himself has become the warrior he was searching for. He returns to his village and defeats the hyenas' leader in single combat, making him promise to never attack the village again.

Anggee departs to carry out his duties as the white wolves' new king, Fafl decides to continue travelling the world with Puffy as his new companion. Nanty stays in the village with Savva, who is upset that he may never see Anggee again. However, Anggee, who had never intended to stay away forever, returns to the village. The film ends with Anggee, Savva and Nanty running across a field of flowers.

== Cast ==
Russian	English	Role
Maksim Chikhachiov	Milla Jovovich	Savva
Mariya Kozhevnikova	Stephanie J. Block	Savva's mother
Fyodor Bondarchuk	Patrick Page	Elza
Konstantin Khabensky	Will Chase	Anggee/Prince Angacetus
Lolita Milyavskaya	Whoopi Goldberg	Mom Jozee
Yulia Savicheva	Madeleine Yen	Nanty
Mikhail Galustyan	Geoffrey Cantor	Semi-Baron Fafl
Natalya Ionova	Sharon Stone	Pusik/Puffy
Lidiya Chistyakova-Ionova	Oril Hersch	Magician
Sergey Shnurov	Richard Virgil	Artist Monkey
Igor Vernik	Adam Grupper	Shantagar
Sergei Garmash	Michael-Leon Wooley	Morton
Grigory Leps	Joe Pesci	Komar
Armen Dzhigarkhanyan	Jim Cummings	Narrator, Shisha

== Release ==
A Warrior's Tail was first released in Russia on 12 November 2015 and was released worldwide over a period lasting from its 12 November release in Russia to its release in Italy on 20 July 2017. It was released in the UK on 1 April 2016.

== Reception ==
A Warrior's Tale has an approval rating of 20% "rotten" on review aggregator website Rotten Tomatoes, based on 5 reviews, and an average rating of 4.4/10.
