= I Believe! =

- Russian: Верую!
- Directed by: Lidia Bobrova
- Written by: Lidia Bobrova; Vasiliy Shukshin
- Produced by: Lidia Bobrova; Vyacheslav Telnov
- Starring: Aleksandr Aravushkin; Veronika Babichuk; Aleksandr Fyodorov; Yuriy Katchalov; Sasha Kozlov
- Cinematography: Ilya Klyuzhin; Valery Revich
- Release date: 2009
- Country: Russia
- Language: Russian

I Believe! (Russian: Верую!) is a 2009 Russian drama film directed by Lidia Bobrova.

== Plot ==
The film tells the story of an unbelieving alcoholic man who has embarked on a path of spiritual rebirth.

== Cast ==
- Aleksandr Aravushkin as Maksim
- Veronika Babichuk as Nastya
- Aleksandr Fyodorov as Teacher
- Yuriy Katchalov as Policeman
- Sasha Kozlov as Valerka
- Irina Osnovina as Ludmila
- Tatyana Smirnova
- Vera Smolina
- Fyodor Yasnikov as Priest
- Yury Zhigarkov as Sanya
