= The Blindflyers =

2004 film

- DVD cover
- Directed by: Bernd Sahling
- Written by: Helmut Dziuba; Bernd Sahling
- Produced by: Ingelore König
- Starring: Ricarda Ramünke; Dominique Horwitz; Maria Rother
- Distributed by: EuroVideo
- Release date: 28 October 2004 (Germany)
- Running time: 88 minutes
- Country: Germany
- Language: German

The Blindflyers (German: Die Blindgänger) is a 2004 film directed by Bernd Sahling. It won a number of awards, including the German Film Award 2004 for Best Children's Film, and others at the International Film Festival.

== Plot ==
Two 13-year-old blind girls Marie and Inga are close friends in a boarding school for the blind, and share a love for music. The girls are fairly sheltered in their school, and have a motto, "Trau bloß keinem Gucki!" ("Don't trust a "lookie"" [sighted person]). They try out for a school band, but despite their musical skills they are turned away for their blindness.

Then Marie meets a young émigré from Kazakhstan, "Herbert" (Oleg Rabcuk), and hides him from the police in the school, with the help of the sighted caretaker Mr. Karl (Dominique Horwitz). Herbert needs money to return to his homeland, against his father's wishes. Inga proposes that the three form a band of clowns (which is what the German name of the film implies) to play music in the street, "The Blind Flyers", with Herbert pretending to be blind as well. The band is successful—for a time.

According to the director, the film was not supposed to be about blindness per se, and aimed to portray blind people as normal. And although the characters Marie and Inga are totally blind, they are played by partially sighted actresses Ricarda Ramünke (who won "Best Young Actress" award) and Maria Rother, who in real life attend boarding schools for the visually impaired.
