= Fyodor Bondarchuk =

Russian filmmaker and actor (born 1967)

- Фёдор Бондарчук
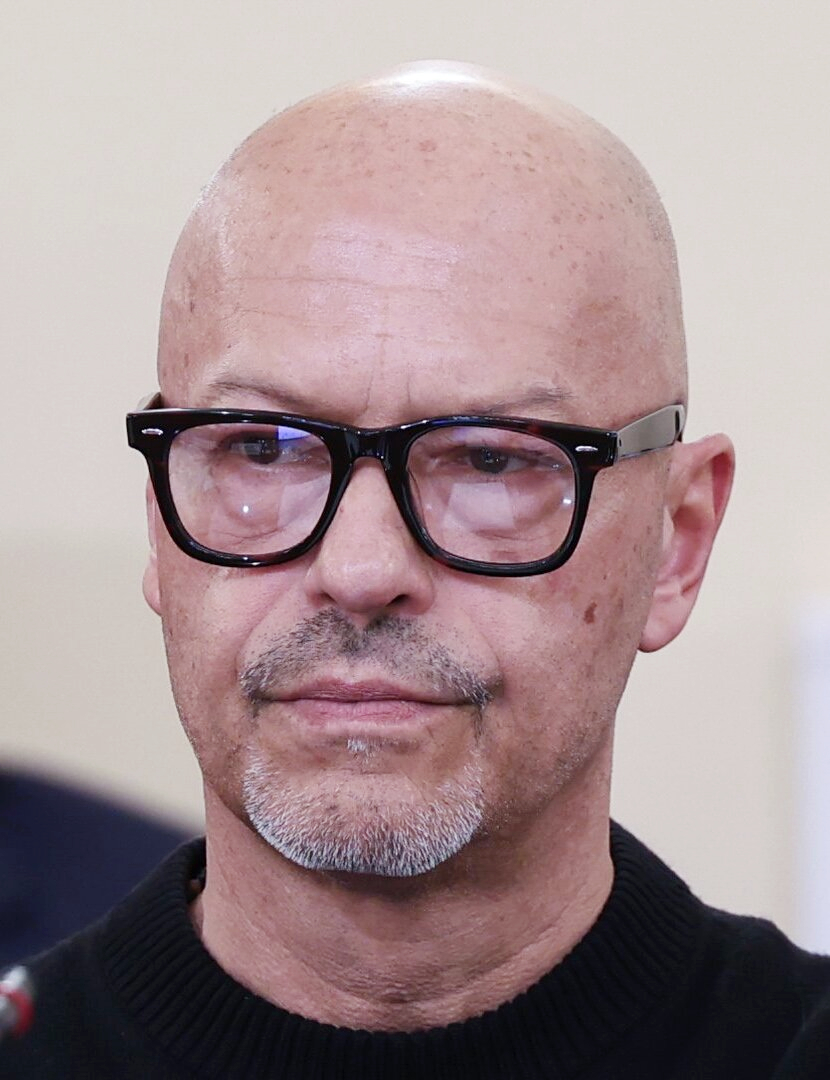
- Bondarchuk in 2026
- Born: Fyodor Sergeyevich Bondarchuk; 9 May 1967 (age 59); Moscow, Russian SFSR, Soviet Union
- Education: Gerasimov Institute of Cinematography
- Occupations: Film director; actor; producer; TV host
- Years active: 1986–present
- Notable work: The 9th Company; Down House; Dark Planet; Stalingrad; Attraction
- Political party: United Russia
- Children: 3
- Parents: Sergei Bondarchuk; Irina Skobtseva

Fyodor Sergeyevich Bondarchuk (Russian: Фёдор Сергеевич Бондарчук [ˈfʲɵdər sʲɪrˈɡʲe(j)ɪvʲɪdʑ bəndɐrˈtɕuk]; born 9 May 1967) is a Russian film director, actor, producer and TV host. He is also the founder of Art Pictures Studio, a production company.

He specializes in action movies, war movies, and science fiction films. Some of his most notable films include The 9th Company (2005), Dark Planet (2008–2009), Stalingrad (2013) and Attraction (2017).

As an actor, Bondarchuk is best known for starring in 8 ½ $ (1999), Down House (2001), Two Days (2011), The PyraMMMid (2011) and Ghost (2015).

He is a winner of TEFI award in 2003 in nomination “The best host of the entertainment TV-show”. He is a two-time winner of the Golden Eagle Award: as the Best Actor in a movie Two Days by Avdotya Smirnova (2011) and as the Best Actor in the comedy Ghost produced by Aleksandr Voytinskiy (2015).

On 15 October 2012 he was appointed as chairman of Lenfilm's Board of directors.

== Early life ==
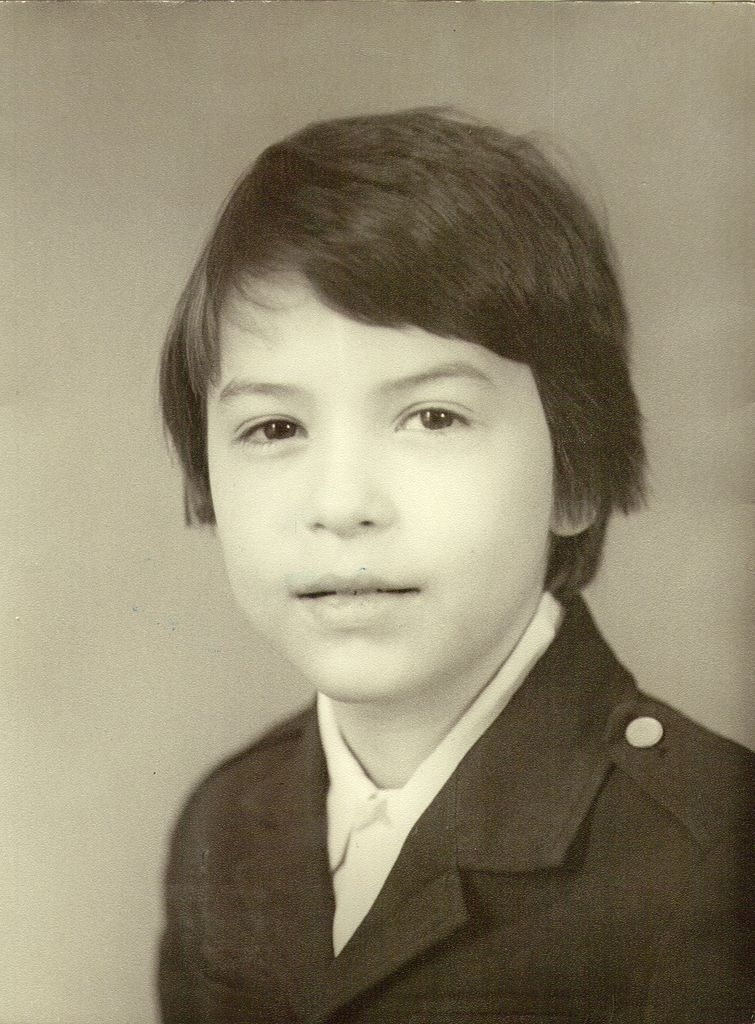
In his childhood

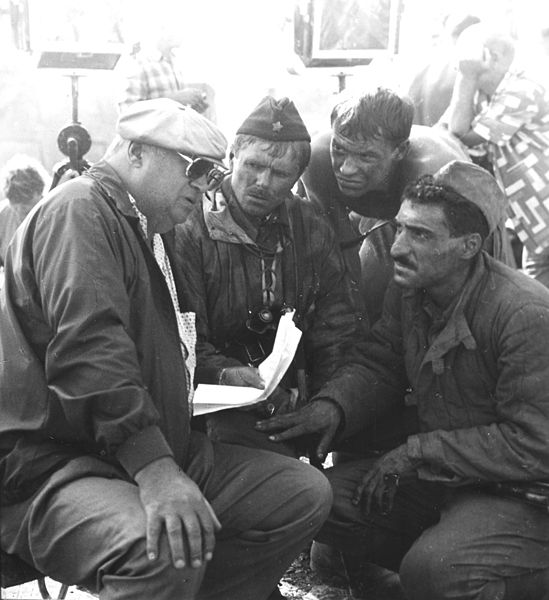
Filming of Stalingrad by Yuri Ozerov, 1987

Fyodor was born on 9 May 1967 in Moscow, to actress Irina Skobtseva and director Sergei Bondarchuk.

In 1992 he graduated as a film director from the Gerasimov Institute of Cinematography, in the class of Yuri Ozerov.

== Career ==
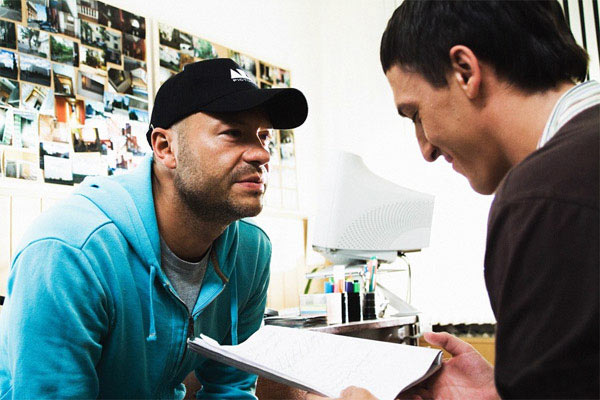
Fyodor Bondarchuk during the filming of Heat

His acting debut was with his father in 1986 in the film Boris Godunov (1986), with Sergei Bondarchuk serving as the director of the movie.

In 1990 he started his career as the first Russian producer of music videos. In 1993 he won the Ovation award as the best producer of musical video.

Bondarchuk's breakthrough as an actor came with his dual role in the 1999 cult film 8 ½ $ by Grigori Konstantinopolsky, where he played both Fyodor and Stepan. In 2001 Fyodor played the role of Count Myshkin in Down House, loosely based on Dostoyevsky's novel The Idiot.

Fyodor Bondarchuk started his career as a film producer in 2002, beginning with the film In Motion (2002). Since that he has produced over twenty film projects that were great box-office successes. Bondarchuk won the 2003 TEFI Award for "the Best Host of the Entertainment TV-Show". In 2005 he directed his debut film The 9th Company, which was based on real events which happened during the Afghan war (1979–1989). The filming process took place in the Crimea, and lasted 5 months. The 9th Company eventually won 7 awards and was nominated eight times. It also broke the former box office record. The 9th Company became the first Russian film earning $25 million. In 2006 The 9th Company was submitted for Best Foreign Film on Academy Award, but it was ultimately not nominated.

“This film is about my generation, about the war and friendship. About men's love, feat, treason and loyalty” – Bondarchuk said, – “Probably the truth I was trying to show there will not be pleasant to our generals. But Afghan soldiers who were excited after viewing our film is the best proof for me. That is really important”.

Also Fyodor created Dark Planet (2008). In 2006 Boris Strugatskiy gave him the rights to adapt the fantasy novel Prisoners of Power. The overall time of the shooting took 222 days. Production and distribution of Inhabited Island was realized by Fyodor Bondarchuk's film company Art Pictures Studio. The film earned $30 million and took the third place of the box office of CIS area in 2009. In 2012 Bondarchuk received the Golden Eagle Award for the Best Actor in the film Two Days (2011) by Avdotya Smirnova. At the same year, Fyodor and film producer Alexander Rodnyansky officially announced the beginning of the cooperation with IMAX Filmed Entertainment (also known as IMAX Corporation).

Greg Foster, the president of the company, said:

“Fyodor and Alexander showed me a 15 minute fragment of Stalingrad. And I'm very glad that we did a right choice in choosing a partners”.

As a result, their project Stalingrad was the first Russian film shown in IMAX format. It was released in October 2013.

In 2017 Fedor Bondarchuk directed the science fiction film Attraction. It was a box office success and earned $18 million. Over 4 million viewers watched Attraction in cinema, and it was the leader of online streaming after the digital release. The follow-up of this story, the film Invasion, came out in theaters in January 2020 and grossed over $11.5 million in cinemas (with more than 2 million audience). Fedor Bondarchuk's most recent project is his first TV-series Psycho – a dramatic story about a modern psychotherapist with Konstantin Bogomolov and Elena Lyadova in leading roles. Psycho was released on more.tv streaming service on 5 November. Russian NMG Studio and Renta Videostudio are producing.

In 2023 Bondarchuk directed the TV series Actresses, also written by Paulina Andreeva.

=== Other roles ===
Bondarchuk is chair of the board of trustees of the Kinotavr Film Festival, a member of the Russian Academy of Cinema Arts and Science (responsible for the Nika Awards) and a member of the National Academy of Motion Pictures Arts and Sciences of Russia (responsible for the Golden Eagle Awards).

== Business ==
=== Art Pictures Studio ===
Fyodor is a founder of Art Pictures Studio production company, which he founded in 1991 together with his friends Juhan Saul Gross and Stepan Mikhalkov and reorganized it into the Art Pictures Studio in 2006 with his partner Dmitry Rudovskiy. The main area of the company is film and video production and distribution. The company is working with a variety of projects, ranging from music and advertising videos to feature films.

Musical and advertising videos made by Art Pictures received a lot of Russian and international awards. The company worked with Heinz, Philips, Sony, Zikr (Colgate total), Pepsi etc. In 2002 Art Pictures moved into film production.

In 2012 Fyodor Bondarchuk produced the screen adaption of Sergey Minaev's book of the same name, Dukhless. Released in October 2012, it became the most successful Russian fiction film that year. The sequel, Dukhless 2, was released in 2015.

In 2018 he produced another Minaev adaptation, Selfie, and the box-office hit musical film Ice which grossed $22 million against the budget of $2 million.

Among the most famous Art Picture Studio's film projects are the dilogy Soulles (2012) and Soulles 2 (2015) (both features were based on Sergey Minaev's books of the same name). The first picture of this series became the most successful Russian fiction film in 2012. The sequel Soulles 2 grossed more than $8 million. In 2018 Fedor Bondarchuk produced another Minaev's adaptation Selfie (grossed more than $4 million). In 2018 APS also released a musical film Ice that became a box-office hit and grossed more than $22 million against the budget of $2 million. Its sequel Ice 2 (2020) was released in February and grossed more than $21 million.

One of the latest Studio's projects, sci-fi thriller Sputnik (2020). In Russia the picture was digitally released in April and was viewed more than 1 million times after just one month of streaming. After its release in the USA Sputnik also became Number 1 in American iTunes (the "Horror" category) and made it to the service's top-5 in general. Sputnik's Rotten Tomatoes score is almost 90%, the first Russian project to be rated this highly. APS is also developing its first documentary focusing on a figure of Academy-Award winning director Sergei Bondarchuk. Helming the project are journalists Denis Kataev and Anton Jelnov with Ilya Belov as a director.

Art Pictures Studio also has a subdivision Art Pictures Vision that specializes in TV production. This company's portfolio includes such hits as The Year of Culture (TNT channel), 90's. Funny and loud!, Psychologirls (STS channel). In 2019 other Vision's projects were digitally released on Amazon Prime streaming service: sports drama Junior League (STS), spy thriller Sleepers (TV 1st channel) and a horror story The day after. Among current popular Art Pictures Vision projects are a road-movie type of comedy Let's go!(STS) and sports comedy Lanky Girls (STS). Among new releases are – a detective period piece An Hour before the Dawn and story about the Russian moto sport team Kamaz Master, titled Master.

=== Glavkino ===
In 2008 Fyodor Bondarchuk together with Konstantin Ernst (Director General of the Russian Channel One) and Ilya Bachurin founded the large-scale project Glavkino. The project consists of a television and television complex, a hardware complex, a production center, a script laboratory. In 2011 Glavkino and New York Art Academy founded a grant named after Sergei Bondarchuk.

In 2017 Glavkino ownership was transferred from its founders, including Fyodor Bondarchuk, Konstantin Ernst, Ilya Bachurin, Vitaly Golovachev and Nikolai Tsvetkov, to the creditor VTB Bank. Each of the five founders of Glavkino received $1800 each, while VTB repaid the studio's debts, estimated at $52 million.

=== Kinositi ===
In 2009 Fyodor Bondarchuk with producer Sergey Selianov initiated the project Kinositi. The main mission of this company is to create network of multimedia educational cinema complexes throughout Russia. In 2012, Kinositi became the official partner of cinema chain Premier Zal.

=== Restaurant business ===
Fyodor Bondarchuk is a co-owner of two restaurants in Moscow (together with his friends and partners Stepan Mikhalkov, Arkadiy Novikov and Kirill Gusev).

== Television ==
Fyodor Bondarchuk is a popular television host in Russia. His show about the world of cinema aired weekly on the STS TV channel in Russia. His guests in the studio included Oliver Stone, Darren Aronofsky, Michael Bay, Christoph Waltz, Daniel Craig, Til Schweiger etc. In 2003 he received TEFI as the best TV host of entertainment program, in March 2004 Bondarchuk became a member of Russian Television Academy's fund. At the same year Fyodor started to host the reality show You are a Supermodel.

In 2013 Fyodor started his career as a TV producer with two projects on the STS channel in Russia.

== Political positions ==
In 2005, Bondarchuk joined the United Russia party and became a member of the board of its youth organization, the Young Guard of United Russia.

In 2006–2008, Bondarchuk was a member of the Council for Culture and Arts under Russian President Vladimir Putin. In 2008, he, together with Rudovsky and the VTB banking group, co-founded Glavkino LLC, a company established by the president of Uralsib Nikolai Tsvetkov to manage the construction of a film and television complex in the Moscow Oblast. In the same year, he was mentioned in the press as the owner of a 30% stake in Glavkino. In the spring of 2009, the general director of Channel One Russia, Konstantin Ernst, was also named as one of the possible co-investors in the media project. It was reported that if negotiations on Ernst's entry into the project and Rudovsky's exit from it are successfully completed, the general director of Channel One, Bondarchuk and Tsvetkov's structures will own 49% of the LLC, and VTB will receive the rest. Subsequently, confirmation of information about Ernst's inclusion in the list of Glavkino founders was not published. In June 2009, the media named Tsvetkov, VTB, and Bondarchuk as co-founders of the LLC; the shares were not disclosed, but in November of the same year Bondarchuk noted in an interview: "Together with Konstantin Ernst, we are building the Glavkino studio on Novorizhskoe Highway. The facility should be commissioned in 2011." Already in January 2010, it was announced that VTB withdrew from the founders of Glavkino. At the same time, as the Vedomosti newspaper reported, the state bank intended to continue financing the project, for which it had already allocated $12 million. At the same time, General Director of Glavkino Ilya Bachurin assured journalists that "the state will still remain a co-owner of the project": according to him, "after some time another structure close to the state will become the new shareholder."

From 2007 to 2009, Bondarchuk was a member of the Civic Chamber of the Russian Federation (as part of the commission on culture).

In November 2009, at the 11th Congress of the United Russia party, Bondarchuk became a member of its Supreme Council. In January 2010, Bondarchuk became the curator of the party project for the construction of digital cinemas in 250 cities. He then assured that no money would be required from the party: it "can only help with information and, perhaps, in some places, with the allocation of a site for construction." In April 2010, the RBK Daily newspaper reported that the project for the construction of cinemas in small towns of Russia, developed by Bondarchuk together with the founder of the Kronverk Cinema chain Eduard Pichugin and producer Sergei Selyanov, would be financed by the Russian government.

In September 2010, it became known that Bondarchuk and Pichugin each bought 15.04% of the shares of AB Finance Bank and joined its board of directors. The purchase, according to Pichugin, cost each of them 150 million rubles. Bondarchuk explained the acquisition of banking assets by the fact that in order to conduct an investment business, it is "more profitable for them to have their own bank."

In 2012, Bondarchuk was a trusted representative of Prime Minister and presidential candidate Putin.

In October 2012, Bondarchuk headed the board of directors of the Lenfilm film studio. On 10 November 2012, Putin decided that the state would act as a guarantor of the loan necessary for the reconstruction of Lenfilm. Receiving a loan in the amount of 1.5 billion rubles was provided for in the development concept of Lenfilm, drawn up by Eduard Pichugin and adopted during public hearings.

From 2013 to 2015, Bondarchuk was a member of the public council under the Ministry of Culture of the Russian Federation.

In March 2014, Bondarchuk supported the annexation of Crimea and signed a letter to President Putin in support of the annexation.

On 20 January 2016, Bondarchuk came out in support of Ramzan Kadyrov with the slogan "#Kadyrov is a patriot of Russia," supporting Kadyrov's call to treat representatives of the non-systemic opposition as "enemies of the people," which caused a public outcry.

During the 2018 presidential elections, Bondarchuk was a trusted representative of Vladimir Putin. In May 2018, he was a guest at Putin's fourth inauguration.

In 2018, Bondarchuk was a confidant of Moscow mayoral candidate Sergey Sobyanin.

On 20 November 2018, Bondarchuk, in accordance with a Decree of the President of Russia, was included in the new composition of the Presidential Council for Culture and Art.

Bondarchuk is a member of the Government Council for the Development of National Cinematography.

== Filmography ==
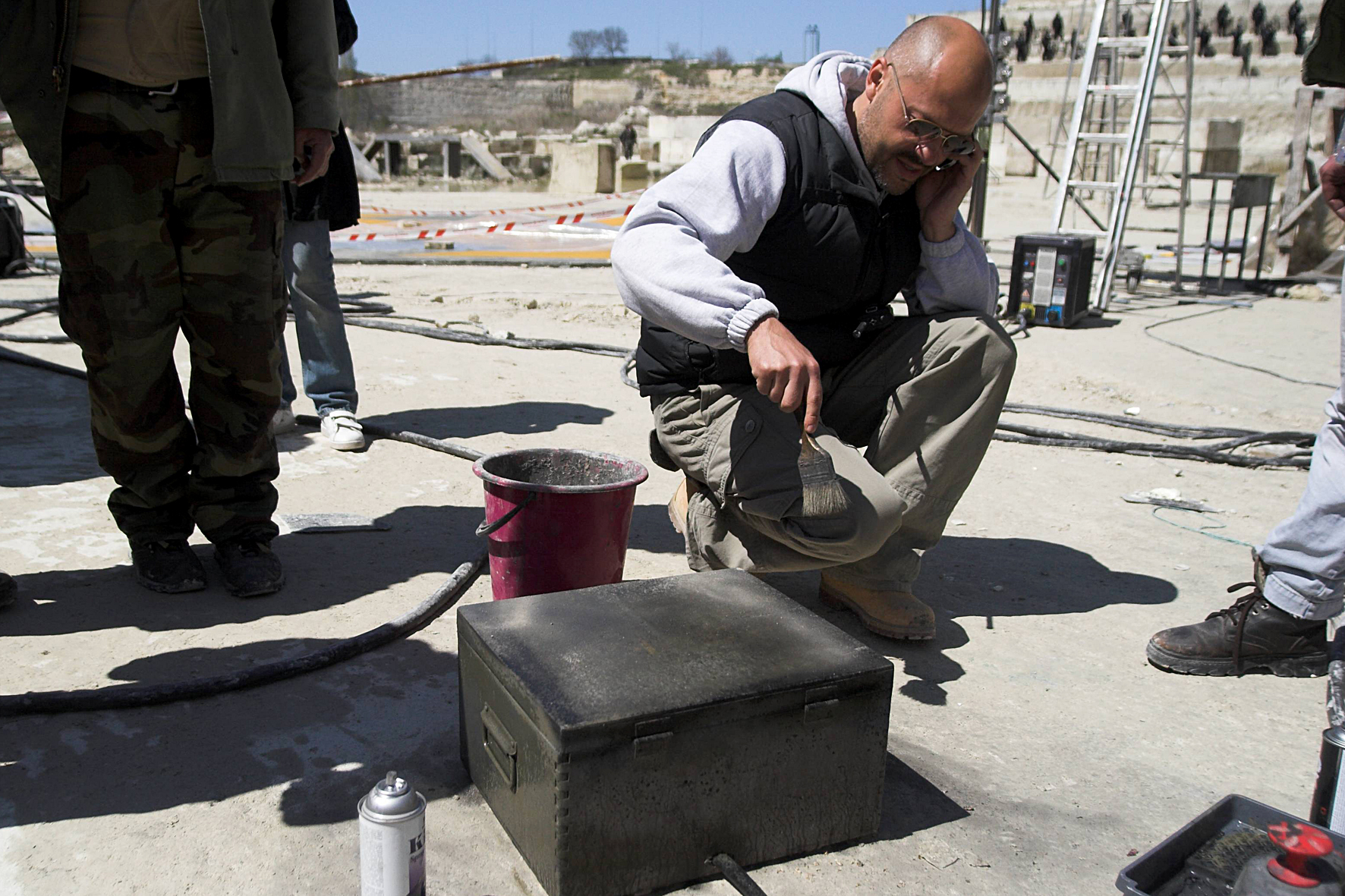
Fyodor Bondarchuk on the set of the film Inhabited Island

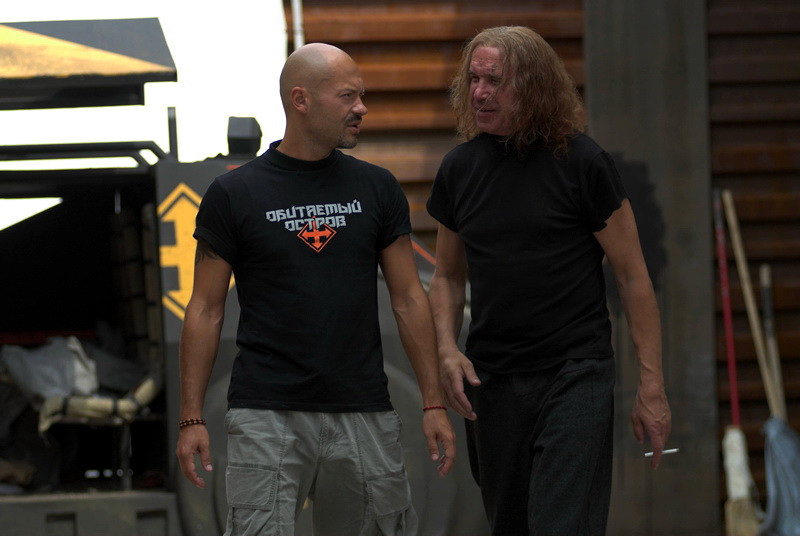
Fyodor Bondarchuk and Sergei Garmash, the shooting of the film Inhabited Island

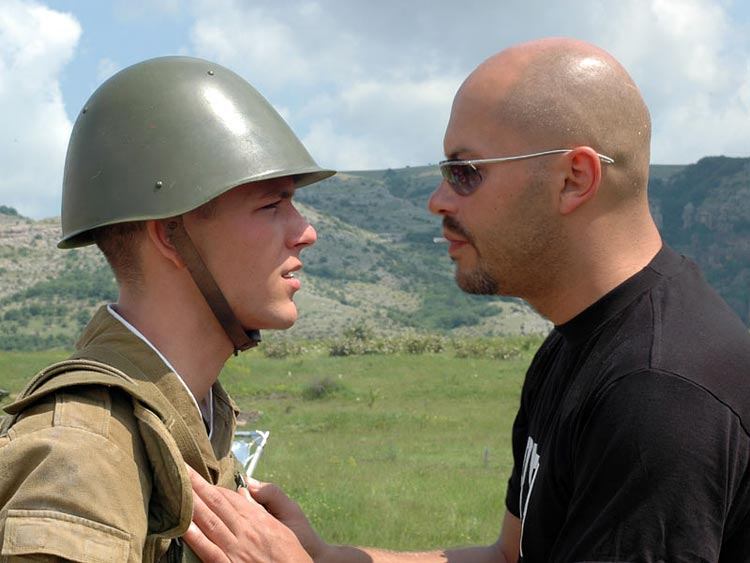
Fyodor Bondarchuk and Konstantin Kryukov, the shooting of the film 9th Company

=== Actor ===
Year	Title	Role
1986	Boris Godunov	Feodor II of Russia
1988	Solnechnyi bereg (original title)	young soldier
1989	Stalingrad	Ivan
1989	A Midsummer Night's Dream	Fedor
1992	Arbitrator	Roman
1992	Demons	Fedka Katorzhnyi
1993	Angels of the Death	sniper Ivan
1994	Shooting Angels	Ivan
1997	Midlife Crisis	Vlad
1998	Stop (original title "Ostanovka")	
1999	8 ½ $	Fedor/Stepan
2000	Showcase	Store manager
2000	Formula of Happiness	
2001	Down House	count Myshkin
2001	Men's Work (TV)	Rebrov
2002	In Motion	Gazizov
2002	Cinema about Cimena	Nikolay Zhiltsov, film producer
2002	Men's Work 2 (TV)	Rebrov
2004	Our Own	the chief of Police
2004	My Fair Nanny (TV)	cameo
2004	B-day of the Best Friend	
2005	The 9th Company	Khokhol
2005	From 180 and Higher	Savik Galkin
2005	The State Counsellor	Burchinskiy
2005	Dacha for sale	Vladimir
2005	Mama, ne goryui 2 (original title)	Leva
2005	The Fall of the Empire (TV)	General Anton Denikin
2005	Happypeople	
2006	9 Months (TV)	Kostya
2006	Tri polugratsii (original title, TV)	Kurbatov
2006	Open Season (animated film)	Boog (Russian dubbing)
2006	Heat	film director
2007	Gloss	
2007	Sem kabinok (original title)	drug dealer
2007	I'm Staying	instructor
2007	Kilometer Zero	cameo
2007	Artistka (original title)	film director
2007	Tiski (original title)	Igor Verner
2007	18-14	graf Tolstoi
2008	Admiral	Sergei Bondarchuk (pseudo cameo)
2008	Dark Planet	Umnik
2008	Sunshine Barry & the Disco Worms (animated film)	Tonny Dennis (Russian dubbing)
2008	Open Season 2 (animated film)	Boog (Russian dubbing)
2009	The Best Movie 2	Fedor Bondarchuk (cameo)
2009	Dark Planet: Skirmish	Umnik
2010	Moscow, I Love You!	suicide
2010	Pro lyubоff (original title)	Vladimir Victorovich
2010	Pseudonym for Hero	Director
2011	The PyraMMMid	Belyavskyi
2011	Lecturer (TV)	Vladimir
2011	Svadba po obmenu (original title)	Ruslan
2011	Two Days	Petr Drozdov
2011	Bezrazlichie (original title)	Petya Selyutin
2011	The White Guard (TV)	Shpolyanskiy
2012	The Spy	Alexey Oktyabrsky
2012	Gold	
2012	7 dní hříchů	Major Uvarov
2012	Tri bogatyrya na dalnikh beregakh (original title, animated film)	Kolyvan (dubbing)
2012	After School (TV)	cameo
2013	Molodezhka (original title, TV)	Oleg Ivanovich Kalinin
2013	Odnoklassniki.ru: NaCLICKai udachu (original title)	Fedor
2014	Chudotvorets (original, TV)	Viktor Stavitsky
2014	Gena Beton (original title)	
2015	Ghost (Призрак)	Yury Gordeyev
2015	The Warrior	Andrey Rodin
2015	A Warrior's Tail	Elza (voice)
2016	Santa Claus. Battle of the Magi	Miran Morozov, the Father Frost (Santa Claus)
2017	About Love. For Adults Only	
2018	Selfie	
2020	Sputnik	Colonel Semiradov
2021	Saving Pushkin	Bespalov
2022	Land of Legends	Grand prince Ivan III Vasilyevich of Russia
2023	Lord of the Wind	Fyodor Konyukhov
2024	Guest from the Future	Robot Werther

=== Director ===
Year	Title	More
1989	Dream in a Summer Morning	short film
1993	Lyublyu (original title)	special project
2005	The 9th Company	
2006	And Quiet Flows the Don (TV)	final editing of a film directed in 1992 by his father
2008	Dark Planet	
2009	The Inhabited Island: Skirmish	
2012	Nowhere to Hurry	
2013	Stalingrad	
2017	Attraction	
2019	Attraction 2	

=== Producer ===
Year	Title
2002	In Motion
2003	Gololyod (original title)
2003	Kamikadze's Diary
2005	The 9th Company
2006	Heat
2008	Dark Planet
2009	The Inhabited island: Skirmish
2010	The Phobos
2011	Two Days
2011	New Year SMS (TV)
2012	August Eighth
2012	Soulless
2013	Odnoklassniki.ru (original title)
2013	The Best Girl of Caucasus
2013	Yes and Yes
2013	White Lily
2013	Evgeny Onegin
2014	Baba Yaga
2015	Soulless 2
2015	Warrior
2016	The Queen of Spades
2016	The Good Boy
2018	Selfie
2018	Ice

== Awards and nominations ==
=== Awards ===
- Sozvezdie 2002 – Best Supporting Actor (Kino pro kino)
- TEFI, 2003 – Best TV host of entertainment TV show (Kreslo, STS)
- Nika Award, 2006 – Best Feature Film (The 9th Company, director Fedor Bondarchuk)
- Golden Eagle Award, 2006 – Best Feature Film (The 9th Company, director Fedor Bondarchuk)
- Golden Aries Award (Russia), 2006 – Best Film (The 9th Company, director Fedor Bondarchuk)
- Golden Aries Award (Russia), 2006 – Best directing debut (The 9th Company, director Fedor Bondarchuk)
- Golden Aries Award (Russia), 2006 – People's choice Award (The 9th Company, director Fedor Bondarchuk)
- Golden Aries Award (Russia), 2006 – Best feature film according to Internet voting (The 9th Company, director Fedor Bondarchuk)
- VIVAT (Russia), 2006 – Grand Prix of the festival (The 9th Company, director Fedor Bondarchuk)
- Blockbaster 2009 (Box office record on CIS area) (Dark Planet, director Fedor Bondarchuk)
- International Antalya Golden Orange Film Festival (Turkey), 2010 – special prize for the contribution to the world cinema
- Golden Eagle Award, 2012 – Golden Eagle Award for Best Leading Actor (Two Days, director Dunya Smirnova)

=== Nominations ===
- Nika Award, 2003 – Best Supporting Actor (Kino pro kino)
- Nika Award, 2006 – Breakthrough of the Year (The 9th Company, director Fedor Bondarchuk)
- Nika Award, 2006 – Best Director (The 9th Company, director Fedor Bondarchuk)
- Golden Eagle Award, 2006 – Best Feature Film (The 9th Company, director Fedor Bondarchuk)
- Golden Eagle Award, 2008 – Golden Eagle Award for Best Leading Actor (Tiski)
- Golden Eagle Award, 2012 – Golden Eagle Award for Best Leading Actor (Spy)
- MTV Russia Movie Awards, 2008 – Best Actor (Ya ostayus)
- MTV Russia Movie Awards, 2008 – Best Movie villain (Tiski)

== Personal life ==
Fyodor was married for more than 20 years to Svetlana Bondarchuk (née Rudskaya), main editor of Hello! magazine (Russia). They have 2 children: son Sergey and daughter Varvara. After divorcing from Svetlana, Fyodor became romantically involved with actress Paulina Andreeva. In March 2021, the couple gave birth to their son, Ivan. Bondarchuk and Andreeva divorced in March 2025
