= Sergey Minaev =

Russian writer and TV presenter

- Сергей Минаев
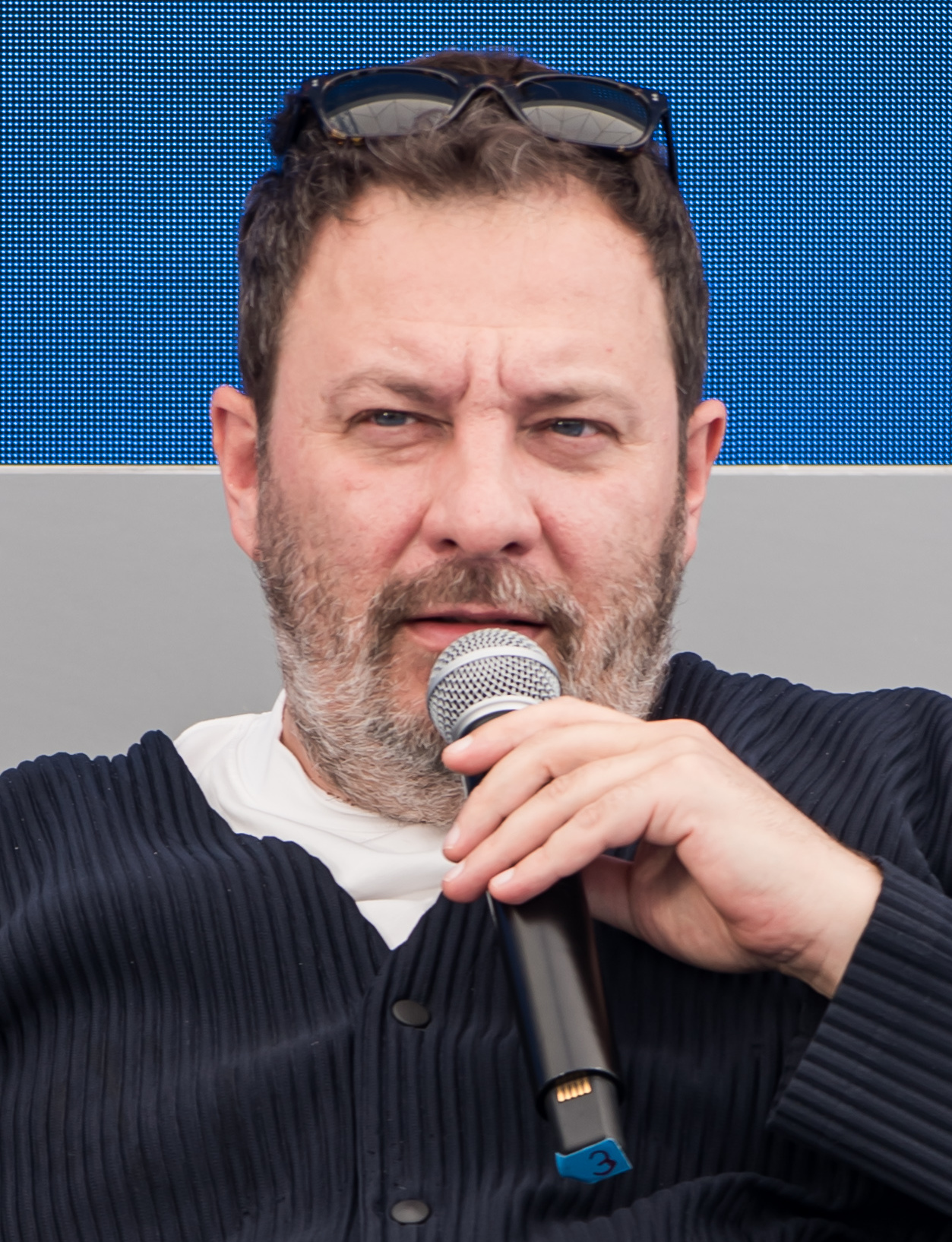
- Sergey Minaev in 2023
- Born: Sergey Sergeevich Minaev; January 25, 1975 (age 51); Moscow, USSR
- Citizenship: Russia
- Education: Russian State University for the Humanities (Archival science, 1998)
- Occupations: Entrepreneur; writer; TV presenter; contributing editor; publisher; screenwriter; YouTuber
- Years active: 2006–present
- Spouse(s): Elizaveta Menshikova (2012–present)
- Children: 3
- Website: amigo095.ru

Sergey Sergeevich Minaev (Russian: Серге́й Серге́евич Мина́ев, born January 25, 1975) is a Russian writer, TV and radio host, screenwriter, blogger, and entrepreneur.

Minaev's debut novel "Dukhless. The Tale of an Unreal Man" (2006) was a commercial success; by 2008 his books had a circulation of over a million copies. In 2012 the book was made into a film adaptation.

From 2009 to 2012 he hosted the program "Honest Monday" on NTV, from 2011 to 2013 he was the author and host of the internet show "Minaev Live". Co-founder of Kontr TV (2012—2013). Since 2019, he has been developing his own YouTube channel on historical themes.

From October 2016 to February 2022, he was editor-in-chief of the Russian edition of Esquire magazine. The current editor-in-chief of Rules of Life magazine (the new name of Esquire magazine in Russia).

== Career ==
Minaev graduated the Russian State University for the Humanities at 1998. From 2008 to 2011 he worked on Radio Mayak and presented the broadcast "Танцы с волками" ("Dances With Wolves") and the show "Игры идиотов" (Games Of Idiots) on the Channel A One together with Igor Goncharov. From 2009 to 2012 he worked on the NTV channel and presented the telecast "Честный понедельник" ("Honest Monday"). From 2011 to 2013 he presented the internet show "Mинаев LIVE".

== Bibliography ==
- 2006 — "Дyxless. Повесть о ненастоящем человеке" (Soulless. The Story Of The Fake Man) (in 2012 the film adaptation was released)
- 2007 — "Media Sapiens. Повесть о третьем сроке" (Media Sapiens. The Story Of The Third Term)
- 2007 — "Media Sapiens. Дневник информационного террориста" (Media Sapiens. The Diary Of The Informational Terrorist)
- 2008 — "Время героев" (Time Of Heroes)
- 2008 — "The Тёлки. Повесть о ненастоящей любви" (The Bitches. The Story Of A Fake Love)
- 2009 — "Р.А.Б. Антикризисный роман" (S.L.A.V.E. Anti-crisis Novel)
- 2010 — "Videoты, или The Тёлки. Два года спустя" (Vidiots, Or The Bitches. Two Years Later)
- 2011 — "Москва, я не люблю тебя" (Moscow, I Don`t Love You)
- 2015 — "Духless 21 века. Селфи" (Soulless of the 21st century. Selfie). In 2018 the film adaptation was released

== Personal life ==
Minaev has been married twice and has a daughter from his first marriage and son from his second.

Minaev was banned from the social media platform, Clubhouse, on February 21, 2021 after participating in a panel discussing feminism.
