= Art Pictures Studio =

Film Company

- Industry: Motion pictures
- Founded: 1992, reorganized in 2006
- Headquarters: Moscow, Russia
- Key people: Fyodor Bondarchuk, Dmitry Rudovsky
- Products: Motion pictures Television programs
- Website: art-pictures.ru

Art Pictures Studio is a Russian film-making company that operates both in the domestic and international market. Founded in 1992 by Fedor Bondarchuk and Dmitry Rudovsky, the studio is part of the Art Pictures Group.

Until 2005 the company specialized primarily in the filming of commercials and music videos, and then filmmaking was chosen as the key goal of the studio's activities.

== Filmography ==
Year	Production
2002	In Motion
2005	The 9th Company
2006	Heat
2008	The Inhabited Island Part I
2009	The Inhabited Island Part II
2010	The Phobos
2011	Two Days
2011	Soulless
2013	Stalingrad
2015	Soulless 2
2015	Battalion
2015	A Warrior's Tail
2016	Kikoriki. Legend of the Golden Dragon (ru)
2017	Attraction
2018	Selfie
2018	Ice
2018	Anyone but Them
2018	Kikoriki. Dejavu (ru)
