= Mariya Andreyeva (actress) =

Russian theater and film actress

- Born: Mariya Andreyevna Andreyeva; 12 July 1986 (age 39); Kirovohrad, Ukrainian SSR, Soviet Union
- Occupation: Actress
- Years active: 2006–present

Mariya Andreyevna Andreyeva (Russian: Мари́я Андре́евна Андре́ева; born 12 July 1986) is a Russian theater and film actress. She is best known for her performance as Yulia in Soulless (2011).

== Biography ==
In 2007, she graduated from the Theater School Shchepkin (course Olga Solomina, Yuri Solomin) and was accepted into the troupe of the Maly Theatre, where she worked until 2010. She is currently working in the theater "Pyotr Fomenko Workshop" (between 2007–2010 she was in the trainee group). She starred in the film "Nostalgia for the Future", "The Book of Masters" and "Soulless".

Maria Andreyeva was featured on the cover of magazine "Teatral" in December 2009, and an interview was published with the actress.

== Roles in theater ==
- Children Vanyushin's by Sergei Naydenov
- Pygmalion by George Bernard Shaw
- 2007 - The Power of Darkness by Leo Tolstoy. Director: Yuri Solomin as Marina
- 2009 - Moliere (The Cabal of Hypocrites) as Bulgakov. Director: Vladimir Dragunov as Armande Bejart, actress
- Through the Looking-Glass (The Red Queen, the Fawn and the Tiger Lily)
- Gifts by Vladimir Nabokov as Zinaida
- Heartbreak House as Ellie Dan
- Auburn as Irina
- Tale of Arden as Rosalinda
- 2014 - Olympia by Olga Mukhina. Director: Yevgeny Tsyganov as Katya

== Selected filmography ==
Year	Title	Role
2020	Dzhulbars - The Soviet War Dog	Kira
2016	Sophia (TV series)	Sophia
2016	Mission (TV)	
2015	Interpreter	Lena
2015	Spider (TV series)	Oksana Demidova
2015	Warrior	Dana
2015	The last car. springtime	Lena Starodubtseva
2015	Fighters: The Last Battle (TV series)	Yevgeniya Dementeva
2015	Soulless 2	Yulia
2014	The Executioner (TV series)	Oksana
2013	Tariff "A Happy Family" (TV)	Nina Nazarova
2013	Live on (TV series)	Natalia Havroshina, fashion model
2013	Vasily Stalin : Son of the Father of Nations (TV series)	Ekaterina Semyonovna Timoshenko, his second wife
2012	Tower: The New People (TV series)	Natasha
2011	Break (TV series)	Marfenka
2011	Soulless	Yulia
2009	The Book of Masters	Katya
2009	Perestroika	
2008	Legacy (TV series)	Rita
2007	Nostalgia for the Future	Anastasiya
