= Mikhail Yefremov (actor) =

Russian film and stage actor

- Михаил Ефремов
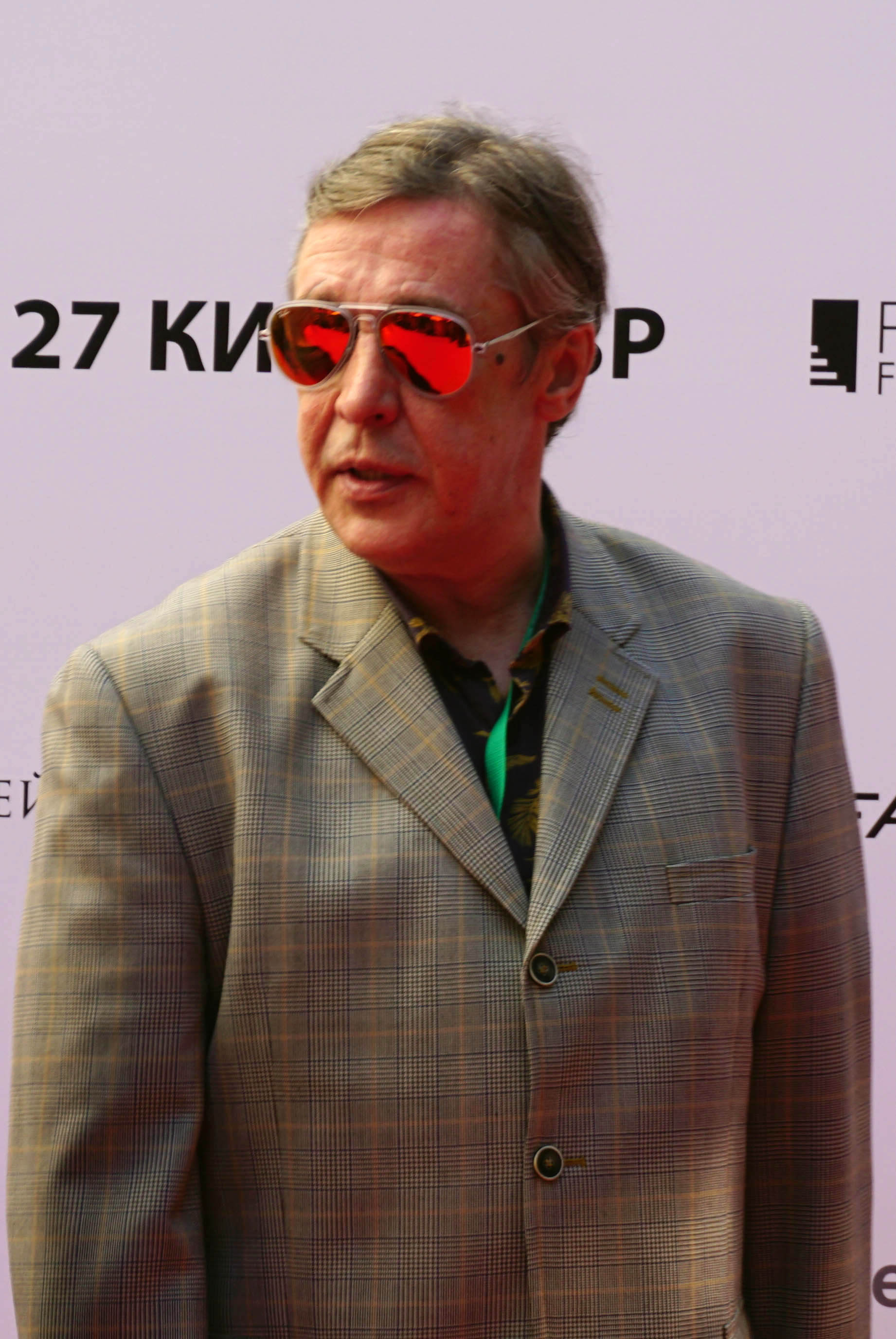
- Yefremov in 2016
- Born: 10 November 1963 (age 62); Moscow, USSR
- Occupation: Actor
- Years active: 1976 — 2020, 2026 — present

Mikhail Olegovich Yefremov (Russian: Михаи́л Оле́гович Ефре́мов; born 10 November 1963) is a Russian film and stage actor, he was honored as the Merited Artist of the Russian Federation (1995).

== Life and career ==
Mikhail is the son of People's Artist of the USSR Oleg Yefremov and Sovremennik Theatre actor Professor Alla Pokrovskaya (Boris Pokrovsky's daughter). He made his stage and screen debut in the mid 1970s as a schoolboy. In 1982–1984, Yefremov served in Soviet Army. In 1987 he graduated from the Moscow Art Theatre School.

Yefremov was married four times and has six children. His first wife was the editor Asya Vorobieva. Their son Nikita is a Sovremennik Theatre actor. His second wife was the actress Yevgenia Dobrovolskaya, their son Nikolay is also an actor. His third wife was actress Kseniya Kachalina, they have a daughter Anna-Maria. His fourth wife is audio engineer Sofiya Kruglikova, they have daughters Vera and Nadezhda, and son Boris.

In 2009–2014, Yefremov presented the Channel One show Wait for Me, dedicated to the search of long lost relatives and friends.

In the 2010s, he collaborated with Dmitry Bykov on their project "Citizen Poet" (a pun on Nikolai Nekrasov's poem "Poet and Citizen"). Yefremov read poems, written by Bykov, which are usually satirical comments on the contemporary Russian society, politics and culture. Each poem parodies the style of a famous poet of the past, e.g. Pushkin, Nekrasov, Kipling, among others. It was originally broadcast on TV Rain channel, but the original project was closed because the poems were too critical towards the Russian government. Currently, the show is hosted in audio format by Echo of Moscow radio station.

On June 8, 2020, Yefremov was involved in a head-on collision while driving under the influence of alcohol. The driver of the other car died in the hospital. A video of Yefremov speaking to the police in a slurred manner after the accident was widely published. The accident affected Yefremov's health, causing him to suffer an ischemic stroke during court proceedings. On September 8, 2020, Yefremov was sentenced to 8 years in a medium-security prison, as well as obligated to pay 800,000 rubles (around $10,000) in restitution to the family of the deceased driver. His lawyer, Elman Pashaev, has been banned from practicing law for one year. On appeal, Yefremov's sentence was reduced to 7.5 years. He was released on 9 April 2025.

Prior to the incident, Yefremov was set to star in the Russian detective/fantasy series Vampiry Sredney Polosy (Вампиры средней полосы, Vampires of Central Russia). Afterwards, the entire series was redone with actor Yuri Stoyanov and all traces of Yefremov's participation were wiped from the series.

== Selected filmography ==
Year	Film	Original Title	Role
1979	When I Will Become a Giant	Когда я стану великаном	Petya Kopeykin
1991	Viva Gardes-Marines!	Виват, гардемарины!	Pyotr Fyodorovich
2000	The Romanovs: An Imperial Family	Романовы. Венценосная семья	Alexander Kerensky
2002	Antikiller	Антикиллер	Banker
2002	In Motion	В движении	Vovan
2004	Moscow Saga	Московская сага	party organizer of the medical institute
2005	The 9th Company	9 рота	Dembel
2005	The State Counsellor	Статский советник	Mylnikov
2006	Nobody Knows About Sex	Никто не знает про секс	Kesha's dad
2006	Piranha	Охота на пиранью	Dorokhov
2006	The Storm Gate	Грозовые ворота	Captain Lanevsky
2007	12	12	8th Juror
2007	Election Day	День выборов	Father Innokenty
2007	Paragraph 78	Параграф 78	Prison commander
2007	Actress	Артистка	Gusyatnikov
2007	The Irony of Fate 2	Ирония судьбы. Продолжение	Ded Moroz
2009	The Best Movie 2	Самый лучший фильм 2	Sailor's father
2009	Attack on Leningrad	Ленинград	Omelchenko
2009	The Book of Masters	Книга мастеров	The bogatyr
2010	Love in the Big City 2	Любовь в большом городе 2	coach
2011	Generation P	Generation П	Leonid (Legion) Azadovsky
2012	Soulless	Духless	Alexey Alexeyevich Kondratov
2012	Rzhevsky Versus Napoleon	Ржевский против Наполеона	Leo Tolstoy
2013	The Thaw	Оттепель	Fyodor Krivitsky
2015	About Love	Про любовь	groom
2016	The Good Boy	Хороший мальчик	Vladimir Dronov
2020	Goalkeeper of the Galaxy	Вратарь Галактики	Vasiliy
2021	Upon the Magic Roads	Конёк-горбунок	Tsar (voiced by Sergey Burunov); filmed in 2018
