= List of Ukrainian European Film Award winners and nominees =

This is a list of Ukrainian European Film Award winners and nominees. This list details the performances of Ukrainian actors, actresses, and films that have either been submitted or nominated for, or have won, a European Film Award.

== Main categories ==
Year	Award	Recipient	Status	Note
2004	Best Actor	Bogdan Stupka for Our Own	Nominated	
2014	European Discovery of the Year	The Tribe	Won	

== See also ==
- List of Ukrainian submissions for the Academy Award for Best Foreign Language Film
