= Mikhail Evlanov =

Russian actor

- Born: Moscow, Soviet Union
- Occupation: Actor
- Years active: 2002–present
- Awards: Triumph (2004)

Mikhail Mikhailovich Evlanov (born March 26, 1976, Krasnogorsk, Moscow Oblast, RSFSR, Soviet Union) is a Russian actor of theatre, cinema, and television.

== Biography ==
In 2000, he graduated from the Moscow State Academy of Water Transport (lawyer). In 2005, he graduated from the Russian State Institute of Performing Arts, course of G. M. Kozlov. He began acting in films during his studies, including playing the sniper Blinov in the film "Our Own" by Dmitry Meskhiev. According to the director, he was not immediately impressed by the actor (the first screen tests were not convincing), but after the first day of filming, all doubts disappeared.

After filming "Our Own", the actor was awarded the youth prize "Triumph".

Mikhail gained recognition for his role in the film "9th Company" (2005), where he played the role of Private Ryabokon ("Ryaba"). In 2008, he played in films "Live and Remember" (Guskov) and "Dark Planet" (Chachu, regimental commander). Evlanov also feeatured in Igor Voloshin's films "Nirvana" (2008) and "I Am" (2009).

He performed in the St. Petersburg theatres "Na Makhovoi" (SPbGATI Training Theatre) and the A. A. Bryantsev Youth Theatre.

Mikhail Evlanov reads poems featured in the trilogy of the Moscow rock group "Svobodny Polot": 2013 — "Past", 2014 — "Present", 2017 — "Future".

On August 1, 2018, the first part of the audiobook "Svobodny Polot" – "Past" (feat. Mikhail Evlanov) was released by the label Bomba-Piter.

On August 6, 2018, the second part of the audiobook "For Two" titled "Present" (feat. Mikhail Evlanov) was released, and on August 13, the third part titled "Future" (feat. Mikhail Evlanov).

On September 27, 2019, the triple CD of the group "Svobodny Polot" titled "Eternity" was released, with 30 poems read by Mikhail Evlanov.

In 2019, Mikhail Evlanov played one of the main roles in the Austrian film comedy "Caviar", in which he portrayed the Russian oligarch Igor.

== Personal life ==
His first wife was Anna Evlanova. They have a son, Mikhail, and a daughter, Darya.

His second wife is Tatyana Konovalova. They have a son, Tikhon, and daughters, Eva and Margarita.

== Creative work ==
=== Filmography ===
- Streets of Broken Lights. Cops-4 (2003, episodes 19–20 "Butterfly")|Valery Tkachenko
- Our Own (2004) – Dmitry Blinov, sniper of the Red Army, son of Ivan Blinov
- Princess and the Pauper (2004) – Vasya, line sergeant
- 9th Company (2005) – Ryabokon ("Ryaba"), Private
- Young Wolfhound (2006–2007) – Wolf
- Election Day (2007)
- Live and Remember (2008)
- Nirvana (2008)
- The Best Time of the Year (2007) – Valentin
- Dark Planet (2008) – Chachu, regimental commander of the Combat Guard
- I Am (2009) – Edik
- Tobol (2019) – Yefrey
- Caviar (2019) – Igor
- The Port (2019)
- Major Grom: Plague Doctor (2021) – Evgeny Strelkov
- Volchok (2025)

=== Discography ===
- 2013 – "Past" (by the group "Svobodny Polot")
- 2014 – "Present" (by the group "Svobodny Polot")
- 2017 – "Future" (by the group "Svobodny Polot")
- 2019 – "Eternity" (by the group "Svobodny Polot")

=== Audiobooks ===
- 2018 – "Past" (by the group "Svobodny Polot")
- 2018 – "Present" (by the group "Svobodny Polot")
- 2018 – "Future" (by the group "Svobodny Polot")

=== Music Videos ===
- 2011 – Music video for the song "Elektrichka" by the rock band "Svobodny Polot" (directed by Mikhail Yevlanov, Ilya Polezhayev)
