= Sergei Garmash =

Soviet and Russian actor

- Сергей Гармаш
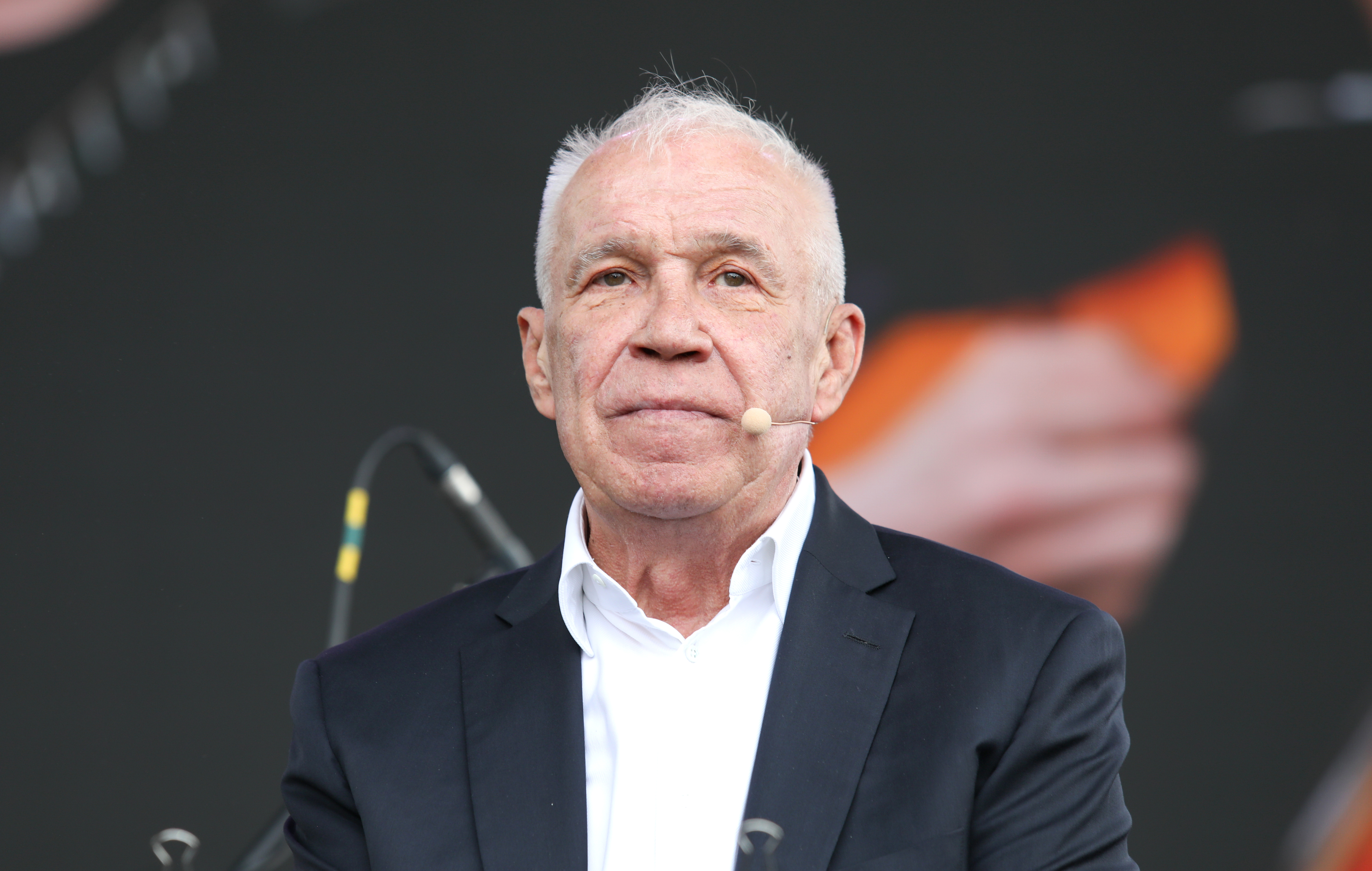
- Sergei Garmash in 2025
- Born: Sergei Leonidovich Garmash; 1 September 1958 (age 68); Kherson, Ukrainian SSR, Soviet Union
- Citizenship: Soviet Union; Russian
- Occupation: Actor
- Years active: 1974–present

Sergei Leonidovich Garmash (Russian: Серге́й Леони́дович Гарма́ш; born 1 September 1958) is a Soviet and Russian film and stage actor. He is a People's Artist of Russia. In 2013 he was a member of the jury at the 35th Moscow International Film Festival.

== Biography ==
=== Early life and education ===
Sergei Garmash was born on September 1, 1958, in the city of Kherson of the Ukrainian SSR, in a family of workers. His mother, Lyudmila Ippolitovna, was from a small village in Western Ukraine, she graduated after seven classes and spent her whole life working as a dispatcher at a bus station. Sergei's father, Leonid Trofimovich Garmash, was a driver at first, then graduated from the institute and began to work in leadership positions.

Garmash was a difficult child, he was expelled from school several times. After school, he wished to enter the nautical institute, but ended up filing documents for the Dnepropetrovsk theatrical school. He graduated from the school with a degree in "Puppet Theater Artist". Then he worked in Kherson, traveling with tours to nearby villages and collective farms.

Two years later, Garmash was called up for military service in the ranks of the Soviet Army in the building battalion. He served in the town of Bologoye.

After serving in the army, in 1980 Garmash went to Moscow to apply to theater schools. Initially, he filed application documents for three theatrical institutions at the same time. Later he picked the Moscow Art Theater School for his studies. Upon completion of Moscow Art Theatre School (class I. M. Tarhanova) in 1984, Garmash was accepted into the troupe of the "Contemporary" Moscow theater.

=== Career ===
Sergei made his cinematic debut in 1984. His first work was the role of Urin in the heroic ballad of Alexei Simonov's Detachment with Aleksandr Feklistov. Then he acted in the films "In the Shooting Wilderness" (1985) by Vladimir Khotinenko, Wild Pigeon (1986) by Sergei Solovyov, "Ivan the Great" (1987) by Gabriel Yeghiazarova, Stalingrad (1989) by Yuri Ozerov, The Master and Margarita (1994) by Yuri Kara, Voroshilov Sharpshooter (1999) by Stanislav Govorukhin and many other films and series before the beginning of the new millennium he starred in more than fifty films.

In 2001, for the role of the teacher of labor Semen Bespalchikov in the successful drama of Sergei Solovyov's Tender Age Garmash was awarded the prizes Nika Award and Golden Eagle. Later, Sergei received the Nika award for his roles in the films My Half-Brother Frankenstein (2004), 12 (2008) and Home (2011).

Garmash's significant roles include Major Korotkov in the detective series Kamenskaya, where he acted for five seasons, Yevgeny Markerants in the Mechanical Suite (2001) by Dmitry Meskhiev, Ivan in "Lover" (2002) by Valery Todorovsky, senior warrant officer Nikolai Krauz in the film 72 Meters by Vladimir Khotinenko, drunkard Yasha in Poor Relatives (2005) by Pavel Lungin, Major Popov in Katyn (2007) by Andrzej Wajda, Mels's father in the hit 1960s set musical Stilyagi (2008) by Valery Todorovsky.

Additionally, Sergei acted in the films Soundtrack of Passion (2009), Black Lightning (209), Lucky Trouble (2010), "Once" (2013), "The End of the Beautiful Era" (2015), The Duelist (2016), the series The Hethers of Major Sokolov (2014), Leningrad 46 (2015), The Investigator Tikhonov (2016) and Murka (2017), etc.

In 2017, the actor appeared in the films Attraction and "Cold Tango". He also appeared in Going Vertical, Matilda, as well as the comedy-adventure Partner, where he played a Major Police Officer Khromov, whose soul and mind were transferred to the body of a year-old child.

=== Personal life ===
His wife is the Russian actress Inna Timofeeva (born 1963), a graduate of the Moscow Art Theatre School, theater actress of the Moscow theater "Contemporary".

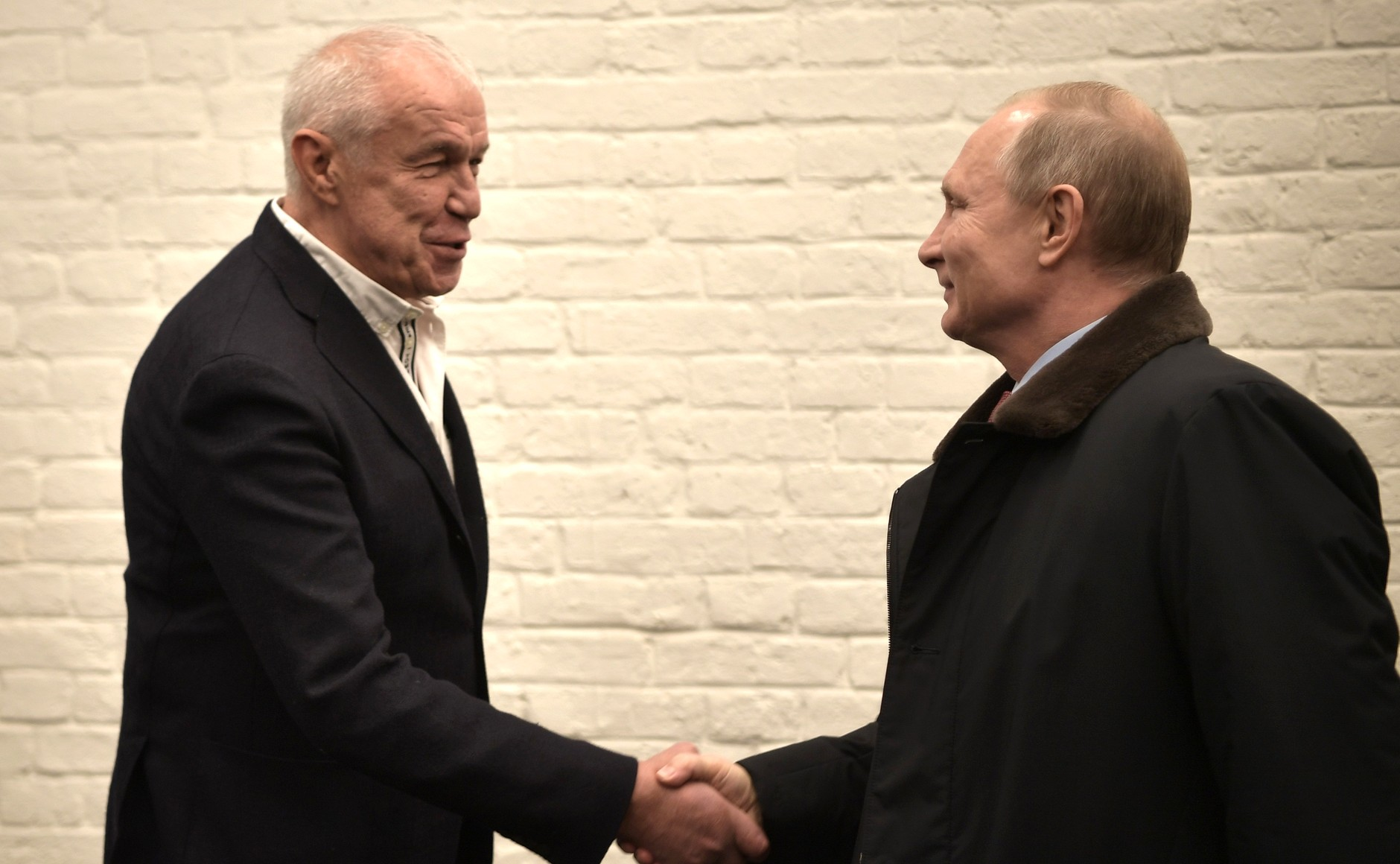
Garmash shaking hands with President of Russia Vladimir Putin

=== Awards ===
Year	Film	Award	Category	Result
1999	Voroshilov Sharpshooter	Nika Award	Best actor in the supporting role	Nominated
2000	Tender Age	Nika Award	Best actor in the supporting role	Won
2000	Tender Age	Golden Aries	Best male actor in the supporting role	Won
2001	Mechanical Suite	Special prize of the permanent committee of the Union State	"Hero of our time" — for the screen embodiment of true male character	Won
2001	Mechanical Suite	Nika Award	Best male actor	Nominated
2002	Lover	Nika Award	Best male actor	Nominated
2003	And they Woke up in the Morning	Golden Eagle Award	Best actor in the supporting role	Nominated
2004	The Devils	Theatre award "Chaika"	"A dazzling moment"	Won
2004	Our Own	Golden Eagle Award	Best male actor in film	Won
2004	72 Meters	Golden Eagle Award	Best male actor in the supporting role	Nominated
2004	My Step-brother Frankenstein	Nika Award	Best male actor in the supporting role	Won
2005	Poor Relatives	White Elephant	Best actor in the supporting role	Won
2005	Poor Relatives	Nika Award	Best male actor in the supporting role	Nominated
2007	12	Golden Eagle Award	Best male actor in film	Won
2007	12	Nika Award	Best male actor	Won
2008	Stilyagi	Golden Eagle Award	Best male actor in the supporting role	Won
2008	Stilyagi	Nika Award	Best male actor in the supporting role	Nominated
2009	Woe from Wit (play in the Sovremennik Theatre)	Public and Business Award "Kumir"	Best male actor in theatre (for the role of Famusov)	Won
2011	Home	Nika Award	Best male actor	Won
2011	Home	Golden Eagle Award	Best male actor in film	Nominated
2012	The White Guard	Golden Eagle Award	Best male actor in television	Nominated
2015	Leningrad 46	The professional prize of the Association of Film and Television Producers in the field of television movies	Best actor of a television film/serial	Won

== Filmography ==
=== Films ===
- 1986 Wild Pigeon - astronaut
- 1987 Moonzund - sailor Pavlo Dybenko
- 1989 Stalingrad - sergeant Yakov Pavlov
- 1993 Children of Iron Gods - People in the pub
- 1994 Life and Extraordinary Adventures of Private Ivan Chonkin - Milyaga, captain of the NKVD
- 1994 The Master and Margarita - Ivan Bezdomny, poet
- 1995 Wolf Blood
- 1996 The Last Courier - Andrej Bubka
- 1999 Strastnoy Boulevard - writer
- 1999 The Rifleman of the Voroshilov Regiment - police Koshaev
- 1999 The Admirer - Oleg Viktorovich
- 2000 Tender Age
- 2001 Mechanical Suite - Markerants
- 2004 72 Meters - warrant officer Nikolai Karlovich Krausz
- 2004 Our Own - chekist Tolya
- 2005 Poor Relatives - wino Yasha
- 2006 Piranha
- 2007 12 - 3rd Juror
- 2007 Katyń - captain Popov
- 2008 He Who Puts Out the Light - Vasilenko
- 2008 Morphine - Vasiliy Osipovich Soborevsky
- 2008-09 The Inhabited Island - Zef
- 2008 Stilyagi - Mels's father
- 2009 Newsmakers - professional killer
- 2009 Black Lightning - Pavel Maykov, Dmitry's father
- 2009 The Book of Masters - Magic Horse (voice only)
- 2010 The Edge - major Fishman
- 2010 Burnt by the Sun 2 - Father Alexander (in the credits - a legless sergeant on a barge)
- 2010 Yolki - militia Valery Petrovich Sinitsyn
- 2010 Lucky Trouble - coach Hlobustin
- 2011 Home - Viktor Shamanov
- 2011 Ivan Tsarevich and the Gray Wolf - Zmei Gorynych, voice
- 2014 Leningrad 46 - Igor Danilov
- 2015 Once - uncle Misha
- 2016 The Dawns Here Are Quiet — narrator
- 2016 The Duelist
- 2017 Attraction - deputy prime minister
- 2017 Matilda - Emperor Alexander III
- 2017 Going Vertical - Sergei Pavlov, Chairman of the State Committee for Sport of the USSR
- 2022 Nakhimovtsy
- 2023 Cheburashka - Gena
- 2025 Cheburashka 2 - Gena

=== TV ===
- 2002 Brigada - San Sanych SWAT Commander (12 series)
- 2003 Lines of Fate - Vershinin
- 2005 The Case of "Dead Souls"
- 2005 Brezhnev - Kandaurov
- 2005 The Fall of the Empire - Sakharov
- 2012 The White Guard - Kozyr-Leshko, Colonel of Petlyura forces
- 2017 Trotsky - Nikolai Trotsky
