= The Port =

The Port may refer to:

- The Port (film), a 2019 Russian drama film
- "The Port" (short story), a 1889 short story by Guy de Maupassant
- The Port, Cambridge, a neighborhood of Cambridge, Massachusetts

== See also ==
- Port (disambiguation)
