= Khairov =

Khairov (Russian: Хаиров) is a masculine surname, its feminine counterpart is Khairova. Notable people with the surname include:

- Ksenia Khairova (born 1969), Russian stage and film actress
- Ruslan Khairov (born 1976), Russian-born boxer from Azerbaijan
