= He Who Puts Out the Light =

- Тот, кто гасит свет (Russian)
- Directed by: Andrey Libenson
- Written by: Andrey Libenson
- Based on: Dark Water by Oleg Osipov
- Produced by: Sergey Melkumov; Dmitry Meskhiev; Sergey Shumakov
- Starring: Aleksei Guskov; Ekaterina Vilkova; Artur Smolyaninov
- Cinematography: Sergey Machilsky
- Music by: Yuri Poteenko
- Production company: Non-Stop Productions
- Release date: October 2, 2008 (Russia)
- Running time: 86 minutes
- Country: Russia
- Language: Russian
- Budget: $3.4 million
- Box office: 9,425,185 rubles

He Who Puts Out the Light (Russian: Тот, кто гасит свет; working title The Sovereign) is a 2008 Russian thriller drama film directed by Andrey Libenson in his feature film directorial debut. The film is based on the story Dark Water by Oleg Osipov. It was released theatrically in Russia on 2 October 2008.

== Plot ==
For the second month in a row, Saint Petersburg is terrorized by a serial killer. Every Wednesday, a girl aged between nine and twelve becomes his victim. The extreme brutality of the murders plunges the city into panic. Parents are afraid to let their children go outside alone, while the press fuels fear and hysteria, harshly criticizing law enforcement for failing to catch the killer.

The investigation is led by police captain Pyotr Moiseev, whose nerves are stretched to the limit. Completely absorbed in the case, he distances himself from his family and life outside work.

A chain of mysterious murders leads Moiseev to the provincial town of Svetlogorsk. To uncover the truth, he must unravel the dark secrets of this seemingly quiet place. Meanwhile, the killer makes it clear that he is close—and that another murder is planned for the coming Wednesday. Moiseev must not only stop the maniac, but also confront his own fear.

== Cast ==
- Aleksei Guskov as Pyotr Mikhailovich Moiseev, police captain and investigator
- Ekaterina Vilkova as Anna, sister of the murdered girl
- Artur Smolyaninov as Alexander Orlov, police lieutenant
- Oleksiy Gorbunov as Alexey Sautin, police major
- Andrey Smolyakov as Nikolai Fyodorov, father of the murdered girl
- Yekaterina Rednikova as Irina Kostrova, senior prosecutor
- Yuri Itskov as Sergey Zaslavsky, copycat killer
- Ivan Kokorin as Ivan, Moiseev’s assistant
- Andrei Zibrov as Igor Strakhov, disabled artist
- Marina Solopchenko as Olga, mother of the murdered girl
- Sergei Garmash as Vasilenko, father of the final victim

== Production ==
The film was shot under the working title The Sovereign. Principal photography took place in towns of Leningrad Oblast, primarily in Kirovsk.

For the final scene, in which a car sinks beneath the ice, a large water tank was constructed at the Volkhov Hydroelectric Station. Stunts were performed by a team of St. Petersburg stunt professionals led by Oleg Korytin.

== Release ==
The film competed in the main competition of the 19th Open Russian Film Festival Kinotavr in Sochi (June 2008). It was also screened at the 2008 Montreal World Film Festival.

The nationwide Russian theatrical release took place on 2 October 2008. The television premiere aired on NTV on 20 March 2009.
