= I Am (2009 film) =

- Directed by: Igor Voloshin
- Written by: Igor Voloshin
- Produced by: Anna Mikhalkova; Maksim Korolyov
- Starring: Artur Smolyaninov; Mariya Shalayeva; Oksana Akinshina; Aleksei Gorbunov; Mikhail Evlanov
- Cinematography: Dmitry Yashonkov
- Release date: 15 October 2009
- Running time: 80 minutes
- Country: Russia
- Language: Russian
- Budget: US$4 million
- Box office: US$70,000

I Am (Russian: Я, romanized: Ya) is a 2009 Russian autobiographical drama film directed by Igor Voloshin about a youth drug subculture in the late Soviet period. The picture won the Kinotavr 2009 award for Best Cinematography.

== Plot ==
The film follows an 18-year-old drug addict who tries to avoid military service by faking insanity in the early 1990s, just before the Dissolution of the Soviet Union.

With the onset of glasnost, the USSR is on the verge of collapse and old social norms are crumbling. A group of youths in Sevastopol indulge in their newfound freedom, experimenting with drugs that have newly flooded the market and dressing in punk fashion long after it faded in the West. The teenage protagonist, known simply as “I” (played by Artur Smolyaninov), is drawn into this circle and becomes close to the gang leader and main drug dealer, “the Romanian” (Aleksei Gorbunov). Facing conscription, the protagonist chooses between feigning insanity or convincing the authorities he is gay. He is sent to a psychiatric hospital, where life is harsh under the rule of the head doctor, Yelizaveta (Anna Mikhalkova). He meets and falls for a nurse, Nina (Oksana Akinshina).

The film is based on Voloshin’s autobiographical novella, hence the title. According to the director, his “spiritual father” in filmmaking, Aleksei Balabanov, encouraged him to adapt his memories. Much of the cast was also involved in Voloshin’s earlier film Nirvana.

Voloshin said of the film:

“The film I is purely realistic. I want it to evoke compassion for those whose youth fell in the 1990s, who perished not in World War II but in a kind of metaphysical third one.”

The director notes that the film explores the nature of evil, the impact of trauma on human relations, as well as faith, truth, and tragic loss.

The story is set in Voloshin’s hometown of Sevastopol. Filming took place in Moscow, Saint Petersburg, Sevastopol, Simeiz, and Alupka. I depicts the fate of a “lost generation” of the 1980s.

== Cast ==
- Artur Smolyaninov — I
- Aleksei Gorbunov — Romanian, drug dealer
- Olga Simonova — Linda
- Mikhail Evlanov — Edik
- Mariya Shalayeva — Chera
- Evgeniy Tkachuk — Paris
- Yakov Shamshin — Vodyara
- Ilya Del — Karp
- Georgy Pitskhelauri — Gesha
- Roman Radov — Corpse
- Oksana Akinshina — Nina, nurse
- Anna Mikhalkova — Kalitka, head doctor
- Irina Brazgovka — Mother
- Vladimir Sorokalita — Edik’s father
- Aleksei Poluyan — Morgue truck driver
- Oleg Garkusha — Laugher
- Andrei Khabarov — Friedrich
- Pyotr Zaychenko — Chernobyl survivor
- Dmitry Poddubny — cameo
- Vladislav Isaev — Young I

== Reception ==
The film premiered on 15 October 2009.

Oleg Zintsov of Iskusstvo Kino writes that the plot recalls “Boris Grebenshchikov’s favorite mise-en-scène: our angel-alcohol meets their demon-cocaine.” He characterizes the film as a mix of drug-user tales, lyrical comedy-musical, and criminal romance.

Aleksei Gorbunov’s performance as the drug-dealer guru Romanian received particular praise.

The soundtrack was also noted: “It is not only a rhythmic key but shapes the film’s style and meaning — a wild blend of tearful ‘Laskovyi Mai’, cartoonish VideoKids, mob-law chanson by Mikhail Krug, and the gothic Swans — marking the shift from the ’80s to the ’90s.”

Vadim Zelbin wrote: “The Soviet eighties were a hermetic bubble of toxic waste… Voloshin slashes the bubble with a kitchen machete and spills the sizzling contents onto the viewer. Terribly, terribly funny and painful.”

Leslie Felperin wrote that the screenplay, “despite down-to-earth, often funny dialogue, is rather clumsy, though still sharper than that of Nirvana.”

== Awards ==
The film competed in the main programme of the 20th anniversary Kinotavr festival and cinematographer Dmitry Yashonkov won the award for Best Cinematography.
