= Anjorka Strechel =

German film and theater actress (born 1982)

Anjorka Strechel (born 12 January 1982) is a German film and theater actress. Her television credits include Polizeiruf 110 and Tatort. Her film credits include My Friend from Faro and The Edge.

== Life ==
Anjorka grew up in Lüneburg, Germany. She went to Hochschule für Musik und Theater Hamburg to study acting for four years. After her diploma she was engaged at Theater Osnabrück from 2005 to 2010 and performed in more than 40 plays. Since 2010 she has worked as a freelance actor and lives in Berlin. She played at well known theaters such as Thalia Theater Hamburg, Deutsches Theater Berlin, Staatstheater Hannover, Staatstheater Braunschweig as well as in off productions in Munich, Belgrade, Serbia, and Sibiu, Romania. She studies sports sciences and philosophy at Humboldt Universität Berlin since 2013.

Her first appearance on screen was Mel in My Friend from Faro. This movie by Nana Neul won several awards at film festivals all over the world. Anjorka was preselected for the nominations for the German Film Award in 2008. In 2009/10 she worked in Russia with Vladimir Mashkov and Alexei Uchitel for The Edge. For her role as Elsa, Anjorka won the Golden Eagle (a Russian film award) and was nominated for the NIKA. The Edge was nominated for the Golden Globe in 2011 and was the Russia's entry for the 83rd Academy Awards as best foreign language film. The Strange Little Cat premiered at Berlinale in 2013 and had its theatrical release in Los Angeles in 2014. In 2014's Viktoria, Anjorka played a paralympic champion in a racing wheel chair who starts to feel her legs again.

== Career ==
=== Theater (selection) ===
Burgfestspiele Jagsthausen

- 2002: Der eingebildete Kranke ... as Louison (Dir.: Helmut Stauss)
- 2014: Pope Joan ... as Joan/Johannes Anglicus (Dir.: Eva Hosemann)

Kampnagel

- 2003: Edgar Wibeau ... as Charlie (Dir.: Julius Seyfarth)

Thalia Theater Hamburg

- 2004 bis 2005: Tom Sawyer und Huckleberry Finn ... as Amy Lawrence (Dir.: Henning Bock)
- 2005: White Trash ... as Sunny (Dir.: Andreas Kriegenburg)

Theater Osnabrück

- 2005: Spargelzeit ... as Lisa (Dir.: Doro Schroeder)
- 2005: Die Schneekönigin ... as Gerda (Dir.: Katja Wolff)
- 2006: Der Entenfreund ... as Nachfolgerin (Dir.: Matthias Kaschig)
- 2006: Cosí – Was Mozart nie zu träumen wagte ... as Lucy/Julie (Dir.: Katja Wolff)
- 2006: Heimatort ... as Sally (Dir.: Peter Hailer)
- 2006: Schneckenportrait ... as Patientin (Dir.: Nina Gühlstorff)
- 2007: Frühlings Erwachen ... as Wendla (Dir.: Henning Bock)
- 2007: Elektra ... as Chrysothemis (Dir.: Ingo Berk)
- 2007: Musst Boxen ... as Conny/Moni (Dir.: Dariusch Yazdkhasti)
- 2007: Die Ballade vom Nadelbaumkiller ... as Anna (Dir.: Doro Schroeder)
- 2007: Schule der Arbeitslosen ... as Regien Lichtenstein (Dir.: Nina Gühlstorff)
- 2008: Nathan der Weise ... as Recha (Dir.: Wolfram Apprich)
- 2008: Bunbury - The Importance of being Earnest ... as Cecily Cardew (Dir.: Jos van Kan)
- 2009: Andorra ... as Barblin (Dir.: Jürgen Bosse)

Staatstheater Braunschweig

- 2010: Dirty Hands ... als Olga (Dir.: Charlotte Koppenhöfer)

Deutsches Theater Berlin

- 2010: PUTERNICII ... as Programmiererin/Dragona (Dir.: Susanne Chrudina)

Fringe Festival Hamburg/100° Berlin

- 2010/11: Das kleine Hasenstück ... Solo/Performance (Dir.: Kathrin Mayr)

Staatstheater Hannover

- 2011: Die Schneekönigin ... as Gerda (Dir.: Dorothea Schroeder)

Lichthof Theater Hamburg

- 2011: Mein kleines deutsches Schuldgefühl ... as Good Girl (Dir.: Kathrin Mayr and Johannes Ender)

Schauspielhaus Wien

- 2012: zwanzig komma drei meter ruhe ... as L (Dir.: Kathrin Mayr)

Ballhaus Ost/spreeagenten Berlin/BITEF Belgrad

- 2012: Frogs in hot water ... as Marina (Dir.: Susanne Chrudina)

MaximiliansForum München

- 2012: Fluchtraeume ... as Holly/Mallory (Dir.: Sebastian Hirn)

Theater an der Ruhr Mülheim

- 2013: Scham ... as tochta (Dir.: Albrecht Hirche)

Lichthoftheater Hamburg/Theater am Lend Graz

- 2013: Du bist mein Wunder oder: Zieh die Arbeit aus dem Bild as Performer (Dir.: Kathrin Mayr)

Altonaer Theater

- 2014: Pope Joan ... als Joan/Johannes Anglicus (Dir.: Eva Hosemann)
- 2017: Sophia, der Tod und ich ... as Sophia (Dir.: Hans Schernthaner)

=== Filmography/Selection ===
- 2005: Polizeiruf 110 – Vorwärts wie rückwärts ... as Svenja (Dir.: Hannu Salonen)
- 2006: Tatort – Das namenlose Mädchen ... as Alexa (Dir.: Michael Gutmann)
- 2007: My Friend from Faro ... as Mel (Dir.: Nana Neul)
- 2010: The Edge ... as Elsa (Dir.: Alexei Utschitel)
- 2011: Der Kriminalist ... as China Blue (Dir.: Filippos Tsitos)
- 2012: Visitors ... as Karla (Dir.: Constanze Knoche)
- 2013: The Strange Little Cat ... als Karin (Dir.: Ramon Zürcher)
- 2013: Soko Wismar ... as Sandra Krüger (Dir.: Sascha Thiel)
- 2013/14: Danni Lowinski ... as Hashtag (Dir.: Uwe Janson, Richard Huber)
- 2014: Letzte Spur Berlin ... as Kostner (Dir.: Filippos Tsitos)
- 2014: Tatort - Vielleicht ... as commissioner Maria Schuh (Dir.: Klaus Krämer)
- 2014: Viktoria ... as Viktoria (Dir.: Monica Lima)
- 2015: Die Bergretter - Zwischen Himmel und Hölle ... as Tanja Göbel (Dir.: Tom Zenker)
- 2015: Cologne P.D. ... as Regine Schilling (Dir.: Daniel Helfer)
- 2015: In aller Freundschaft - Schlechte Chancen ... as Svenja Kollmann (Dir.: Heidi Kranz)
- 2016: Marie Brand und das ewige Wettrennen ... as Ina Konrad (Dir.: Mike Zens)
- 2016: Polizeiruf 110 - Magdeburg ... as Blondie (Dir.: Jochen Alexander Freydank)
- 2016: Polizeiruf 110 - Berlin - Muttertag ... as Melanie Opitz (Dir.: Eoin Moore)
- 2017: Margot Honecker ... as Edith Baumann (Dir.: Saskia Weisheit)
- 2017: Stuttgart Homicide ... as Svenja Müller (Dir.: Daniel Helfer)
