= Olga Fadeeva =

Belarusian actor

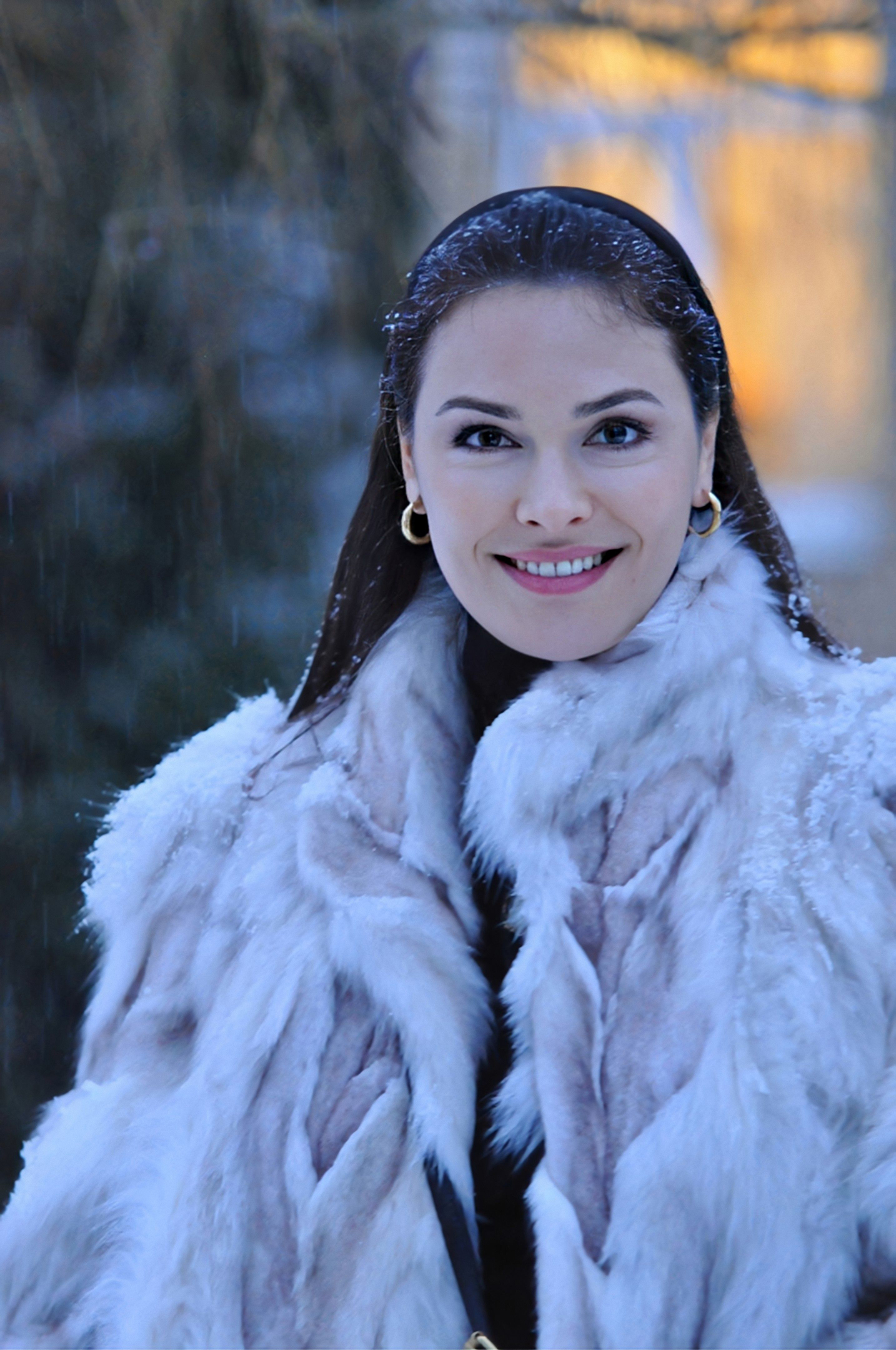
- Fadeeva in 2023
- Born: 15 October 1978 (age 47); Minsk, Byelorussian SSR, Soviet Union
- Citizenship: Belarus; Russia
- Occupation: actress
- Years active: 1999–present
- Website: olgafadeeva.info

Olga Efimovna Fadeeva (Belarusian: Вольга Яфімаўна Фадзеева) is a Belarusian and Russian actress of theater and cinema. She is best known for her role as nurse Irina in the TV series Soldiers.

== Early life ==
Fadeeva was born on October 15, 1978, in Minsk, in what was then the Byelorussian Soviet Socialist Republic. Her parents graduated from the choreographic school, after many years they worked in the State Dance Ensemble. As a very young girl, she dreamed of dancing in ballet. Together with her mother, she came to all the ballet performances that took place in her city. At the choreographic school, the girl was told that she had "the wrong complexion and the wrong step".

Fadeeva decided to enter the theater lyceum. There, she received a diploma of secondary education, after which she continued her studies at the Belarusian Academy of Arts.

Being a student of the academy, Fadeeva accepted an offer to star in Alexander Malinin's video clip for the song "We Must Live". This was followed by filming in several other music videos, including a song by Igor Demarin.

== Career ==
Fadeeva performed her first film role in 2000 in an episode of the film Zorka Venus. In 2004, in Moscow, she successfully auditioned for the role of Irina's medical worker in the comedy series Soldiers. This was followed by other participation in films, etc.

== Personal life ==
At her leisure, Olga Fadeeva is fond of drawing – she tries her hand at the technique of Chinese painting.

== Filmography ==
2000	f	Zorka Venus	teacher
2000—2001	s	Expedited Assistance 2	intern Masha
2002	s	Law	conductor
2002	f	Girlfriend Autumn	mother
2003	s	The Wish Fulfillment Hotel	Valentina Kuznetsova
2004	s	Soldiers	Medical worker, Sergeant Irina Pyleeva
2004	s	Soldiers 2	Medical worker, Sergeant Irina Pyleeva
2004	f	Soldiers. Hello, Company, New Year!	Medical worker, Sergeant Irina Pyleeva
2005	s	Soldiers 3	Medical worker, Sergeant Irina Pyleeva
2005	s	Adjutants of Love	Akulina
2005	s	Tourists	Olga
2005	f	I Remember / Father's House	Inna
2006	s	Who's the Boss in the House?	Frenchwoman Natalie Pesce
2006	s	Soldiers 6	Medical officer, Sergeant Irina Medvedeva
2006	s	Soldiers 7	Medical officer, Sergeant Irina Medvedeva
2006	s	Soldiers 8	Medical officer, Sergeant Irina Medvedeva
2006	s	Soldiers 9	Medical officer, Sergeant Irina Medvedeva
2006	s	Soldiers 10	Medical officer, Sergeant Irina Medvedeva
2007	s	Former	Anna Polyanskaya
2007	f	Room with a View of the Lights	Anya
2007	s	Panther	Regina
2007	f	Soldiers. New Year, Your Division!	Irina Medvedeva
2007	f	Happiness Factory	Diana
2007	s	Other People's Secrets	Nastya
2007	s	Two Destinies 4. New Life	Varvara
2008	f	Russian Transporter	Nadezhda Orlova
2008	s	Blue Nights	Vika
2008	s	Gypsies	Sasha Konova
2010	f	Widow's Steamer	Anfisa
2011	f	People's Commissar's Convoy	Tamara Simovich
2011	f	I Do Not Regret, I Do Not Call, I Do Not Cry	Olga
2011	f	Gingerbread from Potatoes	Vera
2013	s	She Could Not Otherwise	Alevtina Tolkacheva
2014	f	Blood with Milk	Eugenia
2017	f	To Each His Own	Tatiana
2018	s	Swallow	Zara Savina
2021	s	Casanova in Russia	Anna Protasova
2024	f	Fedya. Narodnyy futbolist	Fedya's mother

== Theatrical works ==
Don Juan — Isavel

The Curious Savage — Feri

S. V. — Anya

Yvonne Princess of Burgundy — Isa

More than Rain — Masha

Eric XIV — Karin

Poplar Blizzard — Oksana

Chichikov — The lady is pleasant in all respects

Love in the Baroque Style — Olyana

Idyll

Memorial Prayer — Bailke

Romulus the Great — Rhea, the Emperor's daughter

A Midsummer Night's Dream — Hermia

The Village of Stepanchikov... — Nastasia Yevgrafovna

Tristan and Isolde — Isolde

Salameya — Aisha

Bloody Mary — Young Mary

Prince Vitovt — Jadwiga

We and It — Claudia

Maestro — Ilona

Hamlet — Ophelia

No. 13 — Sister Foster

The Ballad of Love — Julia

The Lark (staged) — Joan of Arc

== Other ==
=== On television ===
Based on the works of Alexander Pushkin — Natalia Goncharova

Based on the works of Vladimir Korotkevich — Vorogin

Based on the work of Vladimir Korotkevich "Violin" — Martha

=== Commercials ===
BelVest Shoe Store

Rosbank "Just Money"

=== Music videos ===
Alexander Malinin "We Must Live"

Igor Demarin "Marilyn Monroe"

Viktor Kalina "The Girl's Tear"

Alexander Torchilin "The Moment"

== Awards ==
- Together Telefilm Festival (2013): Best Actress (She Could Not Otherwise)
- Honorary badge "For merits in the development of culture and art" (November 26, 2015, CIS Interparliamentary Assembly) — for significant contribution to the formation and development of the common cultural space of the member states of the Commonwealth of Independent States, to the implementation of ideas of cooperation in the field of culture and art.
