= Russian Transporter =

- Russian: Непобедимый
- Directed by: Oleg Pogodin
- Written by: Oleg Pogodin
- Produced by: Sergey Danielyan; Ruben Dishdishyan
- Starring: Vladimir Epifantsev; Sergey Astakhov; Harry Borg; Graham Charles; John-Sebastien Cote
- Cinematography: Tomasz Augustynek
- Edited by: Igor Otdelnov; Alexander Amirov
- Music by: Aleksandr Sokolov
- Production company: Park Production
- Distributed by: Central Partnership
- Release date: 2008
- Running time: 107 min
- Country: Russia
- Language: Russian

Russian Transporter (Russian: Непобедимый, romanized: Nepobedimyy) is a 2008 Russian action film directed by Oleg Pogodin.

== Plot ==
The film tells about the special agent of Russian intelligence Yegor Kremnyov, who became a simple surveillance agent as a result of a series of professional failures. But on this his problems have only just begun.

== Cast ==
- Vladimir Epifantsev as Yegor Kremnyov
- Sergey Astakhov as Shering
- Harry Borg as Pharmacist
- Graham Charles as Barman
- John-Sebastien Cote as Harley
- Hristo Dimitrov as Clerk Heinz
- Dmitriy Dobuzhinskiy as Pyostrenkiy
- Vladimir Steklov as General Lyamin
- Yury Solomin as Lieutenant General Vladimir Timofeevich Rokotov
- Olga Fadeeva as Nadezhda Orlova
- Vladimir Turchinsky as Igor Petrovich Solodov
- Charlotte Straface as prostitute

== Critical response ==
Roman Volobuev, in his review for the Afisha magazine, noted: It's common to dramatize the conflict between domestic authorities and domestic big business—and here, the liberal "Oligarch" is little different from something like "Personal Number". But there's a serious suspicion that the real-life relationship between pro-Western oligarchs and hawkish security officers is just like Pogodin's: cruel, but still, first and foremost, a comedy.
