= Lord of the Wind =

- Directed by: Igor Voloshin
- Written by: Andrey Zolotarev; Oleg Malovichko; Igor Voloshin; Ksenia Miroshnik
- Produced by: Fyodor Bondarchuk; Denis Baglay; Mikhail Vrubel; Aleksandr Andryushchenko; Vadim Vereshchagin; Yuliana Slashcheva; Lika Blank; Anton Sirenko; Olga Filipuk; Pavel Gorin; Elena Bystrova; Antonina Li
- Starring: Fyodor Bondarchuk; Anna Mikhalkova; Evgeniy Tkachuk; Andrey Burkovsky; Daniil Vorobyov
- Cinematography: Mikhail Milashin
- Music by: Alexey Rybnikov
- Production companies: Vodorod Film Company; Art Pictures Studio; Central Partnership Productions; Gorky Film Studio; Cinema Fund
- Distributed by: Central Partnership
- Release date: October 5, 2023 (Russia)
- Running time: 94 minutes
- Country: Russia
- Language: Russian
- Budget: ₽850 million
- Box office: $5.6 million

Lord of the Wind (Russian: Повелитель ветра) is a 2023 Russian biographical adventure film directed by Igor Voloshin, dedicated to the famous Russian traveler Fyodor Konyukhov’s round-the-world flight in a hot air balloon in 2016, the film stars Fyodor Bondarchuk and Anna Mikhalkova.

This film was theatrically released on October 5, 2023.

== Plot ==
The film follows the extraordinary life of Fyodor Konyukhov, a renowned Russian explorer and record-breaking adventurer, driven by an unwavering passion for discovery. Konyukhov embarks on a daring expedition to circumnavigate the globe in a hot air balloon.

Known for achieving 25 world records and completing over fifty expeditions, including five global circumnavigations and seventeen transatlantic crossings, Konyukhov sets out on this ambitious journey, planning to complete his round-the-world flight in 11 days. Supported by a dedicated team who prepare for potential challenges, Konyukhov remains aware of the hazards of such an unpredictable endeavor.

Amidst the flight, the balloon encounters a hurricane. Despite the immense danger, Konyukhov persists with courage and resolve, determined to achieve his goal and return safely to those anxiously following his progress.

== Cast ==
- Fyodor Bondarchuk as Fyodor Konyukhov
- Anna Mikhalkova as Irina Konyukhova
- Evgeniy Tkachuk as Oskar Konyukhov
- Andrey Burkovsky as Sergey Rakitin
- Daniil Vorobyov as Nikita Golubev
- Dmitry Kalikhov as Kolya Konyukhov, a boy
- Anna Godo as Anna Konyukhova
- Edward Opp as Don Cameron
- Ruslan Bankovsky as a news anchor

== Production ==
The production of the film was carried out by such film companies as Art Pictures Studio, Vodorod Film Company, and Central Partnership Productions, with the support of the TV channels Russia 1, STS and the Cinema Fund.

Some episodes were filmed in the Republic of Dagestan, there are locations whose landscape is reminiscent of the area from where Konyukhov’s round-the-world trip started in 2016.
