= Mermaid (2007 film) =

- Theatrical release poster
- Directed by: Anna Melikyan
- Written by: Anna Melikyan
- Starring: Mariya Shalayeva; Yevgeny Tsyganov; Mariya Sokova
- Production company: Film Company "Magnum"
- Distributed by: Central Partnership
- Release date: 22 November 2007 (Russia)
- Running time: 100 minutes
- Country: Russia
- Language: Russian

Mermaid (Russian: Русалка, romanized: Rusalka) is a Russian 2007 fantasy comedy-drama film directed and written by Anna Melikyan. It is a loose adaptation of Hans Christian Andersen's 1837 fairy tale "The Little Mermaid". It was a box office success in Russia, won numerous awards, including at Sundance Film Festival for best Dramatic Directing. The film was selected as the Russian entry for the Best Foreign Language Film at the 81st Academy Awards, but it was unnominated.

== Plot ==
As a child Alisa lives with her mother and grandmother near the sea and waits for the return of her father, a sailor her mother had a brief affair with. When Alisa learns that her mother is having trysts with their boarder she sees it as her mother's betrayal of her father and burns down the house. After an eclipse of the sun, Alisa stops talking. Alisa is then sent to a school for mentally disabled children, where she discovers a magical ability to fulfill her wishes. After wishing to move away and causing a hurricane, she, her mother, and grandmother move to Moscow. Though Alisa is initially excited by the move she is forced to take menial jobs which make her miserable.

Alisa tries to enter university, but does not earn enough points on the entrance exam. After wishing that she could study at the university the student who had placed just above her dies in a car accident qualifying her for school.

After a miserable 18th birthday Alisa contemplates suicide by jumping off a bridge. Before she can jump a more determined man jumps first. In shock Alisa jumps in after the stranger and saves his life. Instantly falling in love Alisa begins to talk again.

The stranger's name is Sasha and while initially welcoming of Alisa in the morning, after he sobers up, he is rude and dismissive. Though Alisa tells him she is a ballerina he hires her as a cleaner. Sasha scams people by selling them property on the Moon, Venus, and Mars. To escape what he is doing he parties every night and then becomes suicidal. Alisa rescues him a second time but in the morning he once again is rude and cruel.

Returning to Sasha's home a third night Alisa meets a woman named Rita who tells her that a simple spell to win a man's heart is to smoke a cigarette with his name on it. Rita and Alisa smoke cigarettes together, unaware that they have both written Sasha's name on it. In the morning, while still rude and abrupt Sasha asks Alisa to join him for coffee and brings her to work where he is casting children for an ad for his service. The casting director becomes enamoured of Alisa and they cast her as their "Lunar girl". To celebrate Sasha takes her drinking and then steals pineapples for her. Their night is ruined when Alisa takes a childhood game of "Make the Dead Laugh" too far.

The following morning Alisa wakes up in Sasha's apartment and discovers Rita there. She learns Rita is Sasha's girlfriend of a year. Returning to Sasha's apartment that night, dressed in a mascot costume from her other job, she sees him and Rita having sex and calls him a traitor. The incident causes Rita to believe Sasha is cheating on her and to break up with him.

That night Alisa has a prophetic dream that Sasha dies while on a plane. She calls him to try to stop him from boarding and tells him that her grandmother died in his apartment and she is alone with the corpse, causing him to reluctantly miss his flight. He later learns that the flight he was supposed to be on was involved in a collision killing everyone on board.

Realizing that the details Alisa gave him don't match up and that he has no way of contacting her, Sasha sees Alisa on the street and tries to chase her down. He loses track of her, and in the meantime she is hit by a car and dies.

As Sasha continues to search for Alisa he runs into Rita and tells her he was looking for her.

In the city an ad featuring Alisa as the Lunar girl is now predominantly displayed.

== Cast ==
- Mariya Shalayeva as Alisa Titova
- Yevgeny Tsyganov as Aleksandr 'Sasha' Viktorovich
- Mariya Sokova as Alisa's mother
- Anastasiya Dontsova as Young Alisa
- Irina Skrinichenko as Rita
