= Lines of Fate =

- Genre: Drama
- Written by: Elena Zvantsova; Dmitri Konstantinov; Sergei Sergeev; Vera Fedorova
- Directed by: Dmitry Meskhiev
- Starring: Valentina Talyzina; Sergei Garmash; Irina Rozanova; Konstantin Khabensky
- Composer: Svyatoslav Kurashov
- Country of origin: Russia
- Original language: Russian
- No. of series: 1
- No. of episodes: 24

Production
- Producers: Valery Todorovsky; Svetlana Slityuk
- Cinematography: Stepan Kovalenko
- Production company: Interactive Films Production

Original release
- Network: Rossiya
- Release: 10 November 2003

Lines of Fate (Russian: Линии судьбы, romanized: Linii sudby) is a 2003 Russian television series directed by Dmitry Meskhiev. The series consists of three separate stories about different people in Moscow whose paths become intertwined at one point in their lives.

For her performance in the series, Valentina Talyzina received the Golden Eagle Award as Best Television Actress in 2004.

== Cast ==
- Valentina Talyzina - Rosa Sergeevna
- Sergei Garmash - Vershinin
- Irina Rozanova - Katerina Vershinina
- Konstantin Khabensky - Kostya
- Natalia Surkova - fortune teller Jeanne
- Tatiana Kolganova - Nastya
- Leonid Gromov - Sergei Rudenko
- Andrey Krasko - Azerbaijani Alik
- Mikhail Porechenkov - Igor
- Evgeny Dyatlov - Eduard Voskresensky
- Arthur Waha - Alexey Suzdaltsev
- Zoya Buryak - Olga Nikolayevna, wife of Andrei Shchurkov
- Tatyana Tkach - producer of Bell
- Oleksiy Gorbunov - cameraman Andrey Shurkov
- Georgiy Pitskhelauri
- Natalia Terekhova - Yulia Vershinina
- Yuliya Shubareva
- Marina Zasukhina - episode (credited as M. Zasokhina)
- Pavel Badyrov
