= The Edge (2010 film) =

2010 film

- Film poster
- Directed by: Alexei Uchitel
- Written by: Aleksandr Gonorovsky
- Produced by: Alexei Uchitel; Aleksandr Maksimov; Konstantin Ernst; Kira Saksaganskaya
- Starring: Vladimir Mashkov; Anjorka Strechel; Yulia Peresild; Sergey Garmash
- Cinematography: Yuri Klimenko
- Edited by: Elena Andreeva; Gleb Nikulsky
- Music by: David Holmes
- Production companies: Rock Films; Channel One
- Distributed by: Central Partnership
- Release date: 23 September 2010
- Running time: 115 minutes
- Country: Russia
- Language: Russian

The Edge (Russian: Край, translit. Kray) is a 2010 Russian historical drama film directed by Alexei Uchitel. The film was nominated for the 2010 Golden Globe Award for Best Foreign Language Film and was also selected as the Russian entry for the Best Foreign Language Film at the 83rd Academy Awards but it didn't make the final shortlist.

== Plot ==
At the end of World War II, thousands of former Soviet POWs, repatriated from Germany, were sent to Siberia by Stalin, to be ‘re-educated'. Despite being a war hero, Ignat, a disgraced Red Army locomotive driver, is sent to one such labour camp, on the edge of a dense forest, as punishment for destroying the fastest locomotive in the Soviet Union during a reckless race.

Upon arrival at the camp, Ignat quickly establishes a reputation for devotion to the labor camp's own steam railway engine. The railway line goes no further west than the camp because a bridge was washed out just before the start of the war. On a hunch, Ignat follows the line west, swims the river at the washed out bridge, and continues down the railway line. He soon discovers an abandoned steam engine trapped on the other side when the bridge washed out. Living inside the cab is a young German woman, Elsa, surviving by hunting and gathering. Having been on her own during the past years, she frequently talks to the old locomotive, calling it "Gustav" after her fiancé who was killed during the war.

Ignat and Elsa start out fighting each other and are unable to communicate due to the language barrier. Eventually they start to work together, both in repairing the steam engine to run, and effecting makeshift repairs to the washed out bridge. They arrive back in camp with the awful looking steam engine and continue to work together repairing it.

Elsa and Ignat become isolated from camp people, Ignat for his devotion to his newly found locomotive (he paints its name "Gustav" on the engine in large Russian letters), and Elsa simply by hatred for Germans from the war. Camp members summon the distant political commissar, who arrives by special train. The commissar shows his brutality when he shoots and kills a Russian woman wrongfully accused of sleeping with the Germans. He locks up Elsa in a boxcar attached to his train and departs the camp.

When Ignat learns Elsa has been taken away, he chases down the commissar with "Gustav", running on parallel tracks. Further back, the camp's main locomotive, carrying many of the camp members, is also chasing down the commissar's train, angry over the brutality they witnessed. Ignat's engine is faster, and he manages to get ahead of the commissar's train in a winter race through the woods. He stops the Commissar by cutting him off at a set of points, and knocks him out. Later, the arriving train with much of the camp personnel find the commissar and send him packing down the line on a bicycle. The final scene shows Ignat and Elsa making their escape on a railway pump car, to start a new life elsewhere in the Soviet Union.

== Cast ==
- Vladimir Mashkov as Ignat, front-line soldier, locomotive driver
- Anjorka Strechel as Elsa
- Yulia Peresild as Sofia
- Sergey Garmash as Fishman
- Aleksei Gorbunov as Kolyvanov
- Vyacheslav Krikunov as Stepan
- Aleksandr Bashirov as Zhilkin
- Evgeniy Tkachuk as Borka
- Vladas Bagdonas as Butkus
- Anna Ukolova as Matilda
- Ruben Karapetyan as Sarkisyan

== See also ==
- List of submissions to the 83rd Academy Awards for Best Foreign Language Film
- List of Russian submissions for the Academy Award for Best Foreign Language Film
