= Valentina Talyzina =

Soviet and Russian actress (1935–2025)

- Валентина Талызина
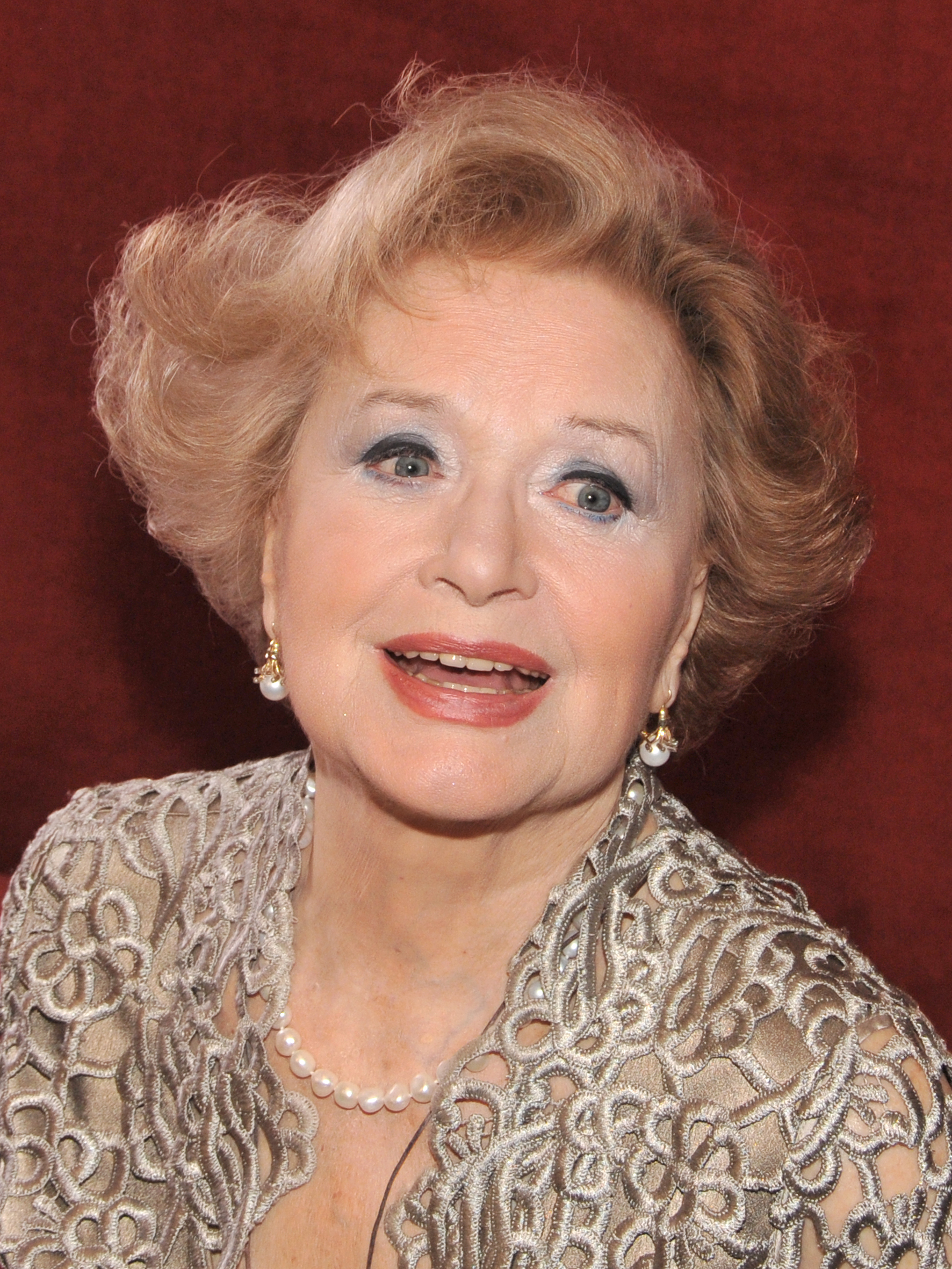
- Talyzina in 2012
- Born: Valentina Illarionovna Talyzina; 22 January 1935; Omsk, Russian SFSR, USSR
- Died: 21 June 2025 (aged 90); Moscow, Russia
- Occupation: Actress
- Years active: 1958–2025

Valentina Illarionovna Talyzina (Russian: Валентина Илларионовна Талызина, romanized: Valentina Illarionovna Talyzina; 22 January 1935 – 21 June 2025) was a Soviet and Russian film and stage actress who was a People's Artist of the RSFSR (1985). Awarded the Order of Honor (2005) and the Order of Friendship (2010). She was a member of the Communist Party of the Soviet Union in 1964.

== Early life ==
Valentina Talyzina was born on 22 January 1935, in Omsk. Valentina's father was Illarion (Ильшат) Grigorievich Talyzin, a Russified Tatar, and her mother was Anastasia (Асылгюль) Trifonovna Talyzina. When Valentina Talyzina was an infant, her family moved to Baranavichy.

== Career ==
Between 1952 and 1954, Talyzina studied at the Omsk Agricultural Institute.

In 1954, she was admitted to the Russian Academy of Theatre Arts, where she graduated in 1958. That same year, she became part of the Mossovet Theatre troupe.

She made her film debut in 1963 in the detective film The Man who Doubts, where she played the role of Inna. But, it wasn’t until the late 1960s that she began to actively act in film. One of her first big acting successes was the role of Nadya in the adventure film Road to Saturn.

Valentina Talyzina had a minor role in the film The Irony of Fate and also dubbed over major character Nadia because her regular actress, Barbara Brylska, had an obvious Polish accent.

For her performance in the television series Lines of Fate, Valentina Talyzina received the Golden Eagle Award as Best Television Actress in 2004.

In March 2014, Talyzina signed a letter in support of the controversial 2014 Russian annexation of Crimea. As a result, she was banned from entering Ukraine along with many other Russian artists and entertainers. In 2023, she stated her support for the infamous Russian invasion of Ukraine in an interview; during this, she also made several anti-semitic statements.

== Personal life and death ==
- Father – Illarion Grigorievich Talyzin, from Russified Tatar.
- Mother – Anastasia Trifonovna Talyzina.
- Ex-husband – painter Leonid Nepomnyashchy.
  - Daughter – Ksenia Khairova (also an actress), granddaughter Anastasia (born 1998).

Talyzina died on 21 June 2025, at the age of 90.

== Selected filmography ==
Talyzina starred in over 138 movies, including:

- 1968 – The Road to 'Saturn' (Russian: Путь в «Сатурн») as Nadya
- 1968 – Zigzag of Success (Зигзаг удачи) as Alevtina Vasilyevna
- 1971 – Grandads-Robbers (Старики-разбойники) as Fedyaev's secretary
- 1972 – Big School-Break (Большая перемена) as school chemical teacher
- 1974 – Unbelievable Adventures of Italians in Russia (Невероятные приключения итальянцев в России) as hostess in the hotel
- 1975 – Afonya (Афоня) as Vostryakova
- 1975 – The Irony of Fate (Ирония судьбы, или С лёгким паром!) as Nadya (voice) / Valya
- 1979 – The Luncheon on the Grass (Завтрак на траве) as Anna Petrovna
- 1981 – Agony (Агония) as Aglaia
- 1981 – Say a Word for the Poor Hussar (О бедном гусаре замолвите слово...) as Anna Speshneva
- 1983 – Crazy Day of Engineer Barkasov (Безумный день инженера Баркасова) as Kobylina
- 1984 – TASS Is Authorized to Declare... (ТАСС уполномочен заявить...) as Pilar (voice)
- 1985 – Guest from the Future (Гостья из будущего) as Mariya Pavlovna
- 1985 – After the Rain, on Thursday (После дождичка в четверг) as Varvara
- 1989 – Investigation Held by ZnaToKi (Следствие ведут ЗнаТоКи)
- 1991 – Genius (Гений) as Lubov Smirnova
- 2000 – Old Hags (Старые клячи) as cleaning woman
- 2003 – Lines of Fate (Линии судьбы) as Rosa Sergeevna
- 2007 – The Irony of Fate 2 (Ирония Судьбы. Продолжение) as Nadya (voice) / Valya
- 2009 – Attack on Leningrad (Ленинград) as Valentina
- 2015 – Kitchen (Кухня) as Elizaveta Genrikhovna
