= Nakhimovtsy =

Nakhimov Residents
- Directed by: Oleg Shtrom
- Written by: Igor Evsukov; Viktor Melnikov; Kirill Kondratov; Maksim Iksanov
- Produced by: Yuri Obukhov; Aleksey Ryazantsev; Sergey Kasatov
- Starring: Daniil Khodunov; Nikita Khodunov; Vasilisa Shakunova; Andrey Merzlikin; Sergei Garmash
- Cinematography: Roman Boyko
- Edited by: Yuri Trofimov
- Music by: Aleksey Shelygin
- Production company: KARO-Production
- Distributed by: "KaroProkat" (English: "KaroRental")
- Release date: July 28, 2022
- Running time: 87 minutes
- Country: Russia
- Language: Russian

Nakhimov Residents (Russian: Нахимовцы, romanized: Nakhimovtsy) is a 2022 Russian coming-of-age film directed by Oleg Shtrom. It was theatrically released on July 28, 2022.

== Plot ==
The film tells about twin brothers Semyon and Timofey Loginov. Their father, a captain of the second rank, a hereditary sailor, wants his sons to continue the military dynasty and build a career in the navy. However, teenagers have completely different plans: the harsh military realities of the boys are not at all impressive, they want to earn money, preferably without putting much effort into it, and lead a carefree life. In pursuit of their dream, the twins get involved with bad company and get into trouble. Loginov Sr. decides to return his sons to the true path and sends them to the Nakhimov Naval School, where they will be made not only worthy people, but also real defenders of the Motherland.

== Cast ==
- Daniil Khodunov as Semyon Loginov
- Nikita Khodunov as Timofey Loginov
- Vasilisa Shakunova as Masha
- Andrey Merzlikin as Captain Andrey Loginov, Semyon and Timofey's father
- Sergei Garmash as Korneev
- Anna Aleksakhina as Korneev's wife
- Konstantin Raskatov as Valery Gordin
- Ivan Yakimenko as Muratov
- Olga Pavlovets as Vera Loginova
- Ivan Batarev as Stas

== Production ==
The project about the young military was supported by the Ministry of Culture of the Russian Federation, and the Russian Ministry of Defense provided assistance in organizing and conducting filming.

Location filming began in 2020 in Saint Petersburg and lasted for a month - from August 21 to September 30.
