= Leningrad 46 =

- Ленинград 46
- Written by: Andrei Tumarkin; Elena Strogaleva; Vladimir Izmailov; Igor Kopylov
- Directed by: Igor Kopylov
- Starring: Sergei Garmash; Alexey Gorbunov; Yevgeny Miller
- Music by: Darin Sysoyev; Anatoly Zubkov
- Country of origin: Russia
- Original language: Russian

Production
- Producers: Inessa Yurchenko; Sergei Scheglov; Igor Kopylov
- Running time: 47 min per episode

Original release
- Release: 2014

Leningrad 46 (2014) (Russian: Ленинград 46, stylized as ЛЕНИНГРАД ★ 46) is a highly popular Russian television series which revolves around the story of courage, the drama of human destiny, for the first time opening up many pages of post-war life in Leningrad - harsh and sometimes cruel. The city has just survived the siege and is still reeling from hunger, destruction and death. Here, the police conduct a nervous war on crime, cleaning up Leningrad after the war.

The TV series had great success among Russian viewers, with ratings up to 6% as of end of 2015.

== Plot summary ==
The year is 1946. World War II is over, but it doesn't mean that there is no one to fight with. The post-war city of Leningrad is ruled by criminals and a growing wave of crimes. The police conduct an unequal struggle against the criminal gangs. The main characters are police captain Yuri Rebrov and the gangster Igor Danilov, a former literature professor.

They lost everything - family, work and housing, and Danilov will be on the other side of the law. Trying to get justice and to avenge himself against those who crippled his life, Danilov sinks deeper into the criminal world of post-war Leningrad, gradually turning into one of the most cunning and dangerous criminals in the city, while Yuri is forced to track him down.

== Characters ==
- Sergei Garmash as Igor Danilov
- Yevgeny Miller as Yuri Rebrov
- Aleksander Lykov as Lavrenty Fyodorov, Head of Criminal Gang
- Vadim Yakovlev as Pastoukh, Criminal
- Igor Sergeev as Viktor Kuzmin, Head of department for combating Gangs
- Alexey Gorbunov as Vutya The Musician, criminal

== See also ==
- Likvidatsiya, TV show about post-World War II Odessa
- The Meeting Place Cannot Be Changed, TV show about post-World War II Moscow
