= Mariya Shalayeva =

Russian actress

- Мария Шалаева
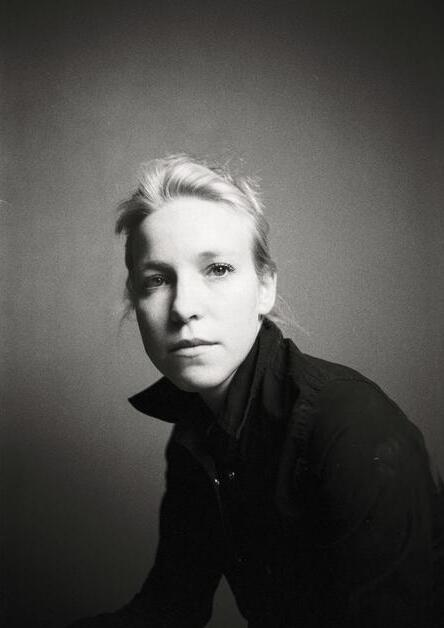
- Mariya Shalayeva in 2008.
- Born: Mariya Aleksandrovna Shalayeva; 15 March 1981 (age 45); Moscow, Russian SFSR, Soviet Union
- Occupations: Actress, director
- Years active: 2001–present
- Awards: Nika Award - 2008

Mariya Aleksandrovna Shalayeva (Russian: Мари́я Алекса́ндровна Шала́ева; born 15 March 1981) is a Russian actress and director. Her film credits include I will be near (2012), Mermaid (2007) and Nirvana (2008).

== Biography ==
Mariya was born in Tushino, Moscow. Immediately after graduation, she entered the Russian Academy of Theatre Arts in the workshop of Joseph Raihelgauz. Mariya Shalaeva starred in over a dozen films and television series, including the films The Freshman, Masha, Mermaid, and Nirvana. Her role in Mermaid earned her several awards and nominations.

== Filmography ==
=== As actress ===
- 2002 Odyssey 1989 as Cheburashka
- 2002 The Freshman as Katya
- 2002 The Messenger as episode (cancelled)
- 2003 Fireworks as Marina Storozheeva
- 2003 Bimmer (film) as girl with telegraph
- 2003 March-throw as girlfriend Mashi
- 2004 Lord of the ether as Dinka
- 2004 Masha as Masha
- 2004 Carousel as Sonya
- 2005 Night seller as girl Dani
- 2006 You do not leave me as Jeanne
- 2006 Cat's Waltz TV as Lucya-Sandra
- 2007 Mermaid as Alice Titova
- 2008 The Brothers Karamazov (TV Series) as Liza Hohlakova
- 2008 The Revenge TV as Polina, daughter Nina
- 2008 Nirvana as Val
- 2009 Jolly Fellows as Sasha
- 2009 Bride at any Cost as Karina
- 2009 Close the gates as Lena
- 2009 I Am as Chera
- 2012 Dialogues
- 2012 Mothers (novel "Operation M") as the cook boss
- 2012 I'll be there as Inna
- 2012 Feast of locked as Nastya Kedrova
- 2013 Women on the Verge as Tonya Sharkova
- 2014 Devils (TV Series) as Maria Timofeevna Lebyadkina
- 2014 Rather, "Moscow-Russia" as the seller of seeds
- 2015 Concerned or Hal as Alexandera Gvozdikova
- 2015 Rodina (TV series) as Yulia Laar
- 2015 Without Borders as Masha, an employee of the border service
- 2015 About Love as Lena
- 2016 Red bracelets (TV series) as Yulia, sister of Oleg
- 2017 Blockbaster as Dasha
- 2020 Has Anyone Seen My Girl? as Liza
- 2023 Clipmakers as Tonya Vodkina

=== As director ===
- 2018 Razvod (short film)
- 2022 Life Syndrome
