= Wolf Blood (1995 film) =

- Russian: Волчья кровь
- Directed by: Nikolai Stambula
- Written by: Leonid Monchinsky; Nikolai Stambula
- Produced by: Mikhail Gluzman; Nikolai Stambula
- Starring: Yevgeny Sidikhin as Rodion Dobrykh; Aleksandr Kazakov; Regimantas Adomaitis; Liubomiras Laucevicius; Sergey Garmash
- Cinematography: Radik Askarov
- Edited by: Leonid Melman
- Music by: Vladimir Komarov
- Release date: 1995
- Country: Russia
- Language: Russian

Wolf Blood (Russian: Волчья кровь) is a 1995 Russian action film directed by Nikolai Stambula.

== Plot ==
The film takes place during the split of the country. Bandits rob and kill villagers, escalating fear everywhere. The detachment of Rodion Dobrykh is trying to fight back.

== Cast ==
- Yevgeny Sidikhin as Rodion Dobrykh
- Aleksandr Kazakov
- Regimantas Adomaitis
- Liubomiras Laucevicius
- Sergey Garmash
- Vladimir Kashpur
- Natalya Egorova
- Alina Tarkinskaya
- Viktor Stepanov
- Yelena Pavlichenko
