= Home (2011 film) =

- Directed by: Oleg Pogodin
- Produced by: Sergey Selyanov; Denis Frolov; Sergey Danielyan
- Starring: Sergei Garmash; Bogdan Stupka
- Cinematography: Antoine Vivas-Denisov
- Music by: Eduard Artemyev
- Release date: 3 November 2011
- Running time: 127 minutes
- Country: Russia
- Language: Russian

Home (Russian: Дом, romanized: Dom) is a 2011 Russian crime drama film directed by Oleg Pogodin.

== Plot ==
The Shamanov family lives in a two-story house in the middle of the Don steppes. The head of the family is the venerable Grigory Ivanovich (Bogdan Stupka), whom every member of the family respects and fears. Father of Grigory Ivanovich, Ivan Matveyevich (Viktor Khorkin), is a veteran of the First World War, chained to a wheelchair and almost unresponsive to the outside world who is preparing to celebrate his centenary. Everyone is busy preparing for the coming celebration.

Meanwhile, Viktor (Sergei Garmash) is coming from Moscow to his old home by train — the eldest son of Grigory Ivanovich, an authoritative criminal nicknamed "Shaman". He is accompanied by three accomplices–subordinates. Upon arrival at the house, the whole family sits down to dine, but the atmosphere at the table is tense, as everyone present knows that Viktor is a criminal. Grigory Ivanovich, on the contrary, is immensely pleased with Viktor's arrival, stressing that it was on him in his youth that he placed his highest hopes. However, Viktor's mother, Nadezhda Petrovna (Larisa Malevannaya), doubts that the reason for his son's visit was the anniversary of his grandfather.

In news reports, there is information about the elimination of the major St. Petersburg crime boss Leonid Barygin nicknamed "Banker", and the accomplices understand that the next victim should be "Shaman". Viktor releases the associates and they in turn, leave him with a part of the arsenal brought with them, including a box of dynamite.

Meanwhile, several people are dressed in costumes at the Stepnaya Hotel, not far from the Shamanovs' house (according to Sergei Garmash, these are FSB officers) who are searching for Viktor. Under the guise of electricians, they try to find out information about the whereabouts of the Shaman, but none of the family members admit that Viktor returned home.

The next night, Pashka (Vladimir Epifantsev), one of the sons of Grigory Ivanovich, goes with Viktor to hunt. Left alone with his older brother, Pashka asks him about how he went to jail. Viktor tells that he stabbed his opponent "because of a woman", and her, he beat up. He later learned that she had a miscarriage because of what he did. Pashka asks Viktor to take him along to Moscow to join his gang. Pashka provokes a fight with Viktor and insists beforehand that Viktor take him along to Moscow if he wins. The fight ends with Pasha getting beat up and the bet is lost.

In the meantime, the militants accidentally meet at the restaurant with Viktor's accomplices and kill all three, first finding out where Shamanov is.

The hundredth birthday of Ivan Matveyevich is approaching. To the celebration the second son of the hero, Alexei Ivanovich (Pyotr Zaychenko), comes together with his wife (Tatiana Shankina) and children. After another quarrel in the house the youngest son of the Shamanovs, Andrey (Ivan Dobronravov) secretly collects things from his relatives and, having borrowed money from Alexei Ivanovich, gets on a train to Moscow.

The battle group approaches the house and takes up positions. The sniper is located on a hill in front of the mansion, looking out for the target, the senior group enters imperceptibly into the house. Viktor feels that danger is near. In the courtyard at this time between the head of the family and his brother, a grand scandal unfolds, into which the rest of the relatives are drawn. A skirmish begins, as a result of which both enemies (both Viktor and the squad leader) are seriously injured. Shouts from the yard drown out the shooting, and no one notices that Viktor alone is in the house confronting the murderers. Finally, the bleeding Viktor notices Pashka. From the window, he opens fire on the machines of the servicemen, but kills only one of them. By order of the senior group, Pashka is killed by a sniper.

Having come to the conclusion that they have organized resistance, the senior group gives the order to open heavy fire around the house. The shelling ends with the death of all the members of the Shamanov family who remained in the house, except for Viktor, Natalia and her husband Igor. The children are also saved because they have left for the river sometime before. Shamanov manages to take revenge on the attackers with the help of Ivan Matveyevich, who, realizing that something was wrong, left the house in a wheelchair and, close to the car of the last survivors, blew up a box of TNT that Viktor hid in his room. Having given vent to his anger, Shamanov looks into the distance and sees a girl approaching him. He recognizes her as Sveta (Angela Koltsova) - his former bride. They have not seen each other since Viktor was in prison. Sveta puts a gun to him and shoots twice, taking revenge for her broken life and for the unborn child whom she lost because of Shamanov.

In the final scene of the picture, joyful children return home from the river by car.

== Cast ==
- Sergei Garmash as Viktor Shamanov
- Bogdan Stupka as Grigory Ivanovich Shamanov
- Yekaterina Rednikova as Natalya
- Vladimir Epifantsev as Pashka
- Larisa Malevannaya as Nadezhda
- Igor Savochkin as Dmitry Shamanov
- Pyotr Zaychenko as Alexey Shamanov

== Awards ==
=== Golden Eagle Award (2011) ===
- Best Supporting Actor (Bogdan Stupka)
- Best Music (Eduard Artemiev)
- Best Editing (Alexander Amirov)

=== Nika Awards (2011) ===
- Best Male Actor (Sergei Garmash)
