= Oleg Pogodin =

Russian film director and scriptwriter (born 1965)

- Олег Георгиевич Погодин
- Born: Oleg Georgievich Pogodin; July 3, 1965 (age 61); Salsk, Rostov Oblast, Russian SFSR, Soviet Union
- Occupations: Film director, screenwriter
- Years active: 1997–present

Oleg Georgievich Pogodin (Russian: Олег Георгиевич Погодин; born 3 July 1965) is a Russian film director and screenwriter.

== Biography ==
Oleg Pogodin was born on 3 July 1965 in the town of Salsk. In 1982 he graduated from Secondary School No. 1 in Salsk. He made several unsuccessful attempts to enter the directing department of the All-Union State Institute of Cinematography (VGIK). From 1985 to 1987 he served in the Soviet Army. In 1993 he graduated from the film studies program of the Screenwriting and Film Studies Department of VGIK (workshop of Marat Vlasov and Armen Medvedev).

Starting in 1992 he worked actively in commercial video advertising. His debut was the first commercial spot for the Russian branch of Seiko Epson. Pogodin also directed music videos for performers and bands such as Aleksandr Marshal ("Ливень"), Nikolai Noskov ("Паранойя", "Снег"), Nikolai Trubach ("Женская любовь"), Vakhtang Kikabidze ("Мы уходим"), Valeriya ("Пополам"), the group Shtar ("Красное платье"), and the band Bozhya Korovka ("Встреча с любимой женщиной").

In 1999 producer Alexander Eliasberg invited Pogodin to salvage the troubled project *Princess' War*, originally directed by Vladimir Alenikov. After reviewing the material, Pogodin agreed to finish and partly reshoot the film, released as Triumph (2000). Film critic Andrei Plakhov wrote:

Pogodin (…) approached the task creatively, drawing on his cinephile knowledge of Western counterculture and underground cinema, and filled the film with the “blasting” music of Maxim Fadeev. One can see that if the director had had full freedom, he might have made something quite acid, like Trainspotting or Doom Generation. (…) I’m one of the few viewers who saw both versions of Triumph. The second is much better and more modern, though also far more “frozen” in formalist professionalism.

In 2003 Pogodin directed the mini-series The Motherland Awaits, a spy comedy based on his own script. His next film, the action movie Unbeatable (2008), flopped at the box office. The director later recalled:

I thought about quitting cinema after that, despite having wanted to direct my whole life. That film pushed me to the brink of disgust with the profession, and I decided not to return to a film set.

In 2011 he directed the crime drama Home, about the collapse of a large Rostov family. The film received six nominations for the Golden Eagle Award (winning three) and four nominations for the Nika Award, with actor Sergey Garmash winning Best Actor.

In 2013 Pogodin released the TV series The Owl's Cry, shot in the style of Soviet spy cinema. In 2021 he directed the adventure fantasy film Upon the Magic Roads, based on the fairy tale The Humpbacked Horse by Pyotr Yershov.

== Filmography ==
=== Director ===
- Russian Transporter (2008)
- Home (2011)
- Sherlock Holmes (2013)
- Upon the Magic Roads (2021)

=== Screenwriter ===
- Escape (2005)
- The Age of Pioneers (2017)

== Awards and nominations ==
- 2011 — Special Jury Prize at the XIX «Window to Europe» Film Festival, Vyborg, “For mastery of cinematic professions” (Home).
- 2011 — Nominations for the Golden Eagle Award: Best Film, Best Director (Home).
- 2013 — III Trans-Baikal International Film Festival, Chita — Best Directing and Audience Award (Home).
- 2014 — Producers Guild of Russia Award for Best Screenplay and nomination for Best Directing (The Owl's Cry).
- 2014 — FSB Prize of Russia for 2013, First Prize in the category “Cinema and TV film” (The Owl's Cry).
- 2015 — Nomination for the Golden Eagle Award: Best Television Film or Mini-Series (The Owl's Cry).
- 2023 — XXXI “Vivat kino Rossii!” Film Festival — Best Directing (Syrian Sonata).
