= Oleksiy Gorbunov =

Ukrainian actor (1961- )

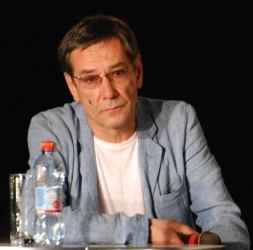
- Gorbunov in 2012
- Born: 29 October 1961 (age 64); Kyiv, Ukrainian SSR
- Occupations: Actor, director
- Years active: 1984–present

Oleksiy Serhiyovych Gorbunov (Ukrainian: Олексій Сергійович Горбунов; born on 29 October 1961) is a Ukrainian film, television and stage actor. He has been named an Honored Artist of Ukraine (1991) and a People's Artist of Ukraine (2016).

== Life and career ==
Oleksiy Gorbunov was born on 29 October 1961 in Kyiv. He spent his childhood in Rusanivka neighbourhood in Kyiv.

In 1978, immediately after graduating from high school he could not go to Kyiv Theatrical Institute because he was not a member of the Komsomol. In the years 1978 and 1979 he worked in the dressing room of the Lesya Ukrainka National Academic Theater of Russian Drama. In the theater, thanks to Ada Rogovtseva, he met with her husband, actor and his mentor Konstantin Stepankov.

In 1984 he graduated from the Kyiv National I. K. Karpenko-Kary Theatre, Cinema and Television University (in Konstantin Stepankov's course). Gorbunov began acting his first film, Unlabeled Cargo on the day he received his diploma.

From 1984 to 1995, he worked for Oleksandr Dovzhenko. From the spring of 1985 to 20 April 1987, he served in the Soviet Army.

In the 1990s Gorbunov worked as a private taxi driver because of the crisis at the Dovzhenko Film Studio. Director Vladimir Popkov helped him get back into cinema by inviting him for the role of Jester Chicot in the movie Countess de Monsoreau.

Gorbunov worked in the Theater Studio of Film Actor, in the private Chamber Theatre M. Nestantiner and Lesya Ukrainka National Academic Theater of Russian Drama. He starred in Ukrainian TV series Night Service (1998) and Wonder People (2008).

Gorbunov is a soloist of "Sadness Pilot" and worked as a DJ on the Kyiv radio stations "Continent" and "Nostalgia". He is also an organizer and presenter of two discos in Kyiv: "Dzhankoi" and "Jumanji".

== Selected filmography ==
- 1984 Vacation of Petrov and Vasechkin, Usual and Incredible as climber
- 1990 Disintegration as Shurik
- 1991 Oxygen Starvation as Golikov
- 1998 Country of the Deaf as supplier
- 1998 Countess de Monsoreau as Jester Chicot
- 1999 Kamenskaya as Gall
- 2003 Lines of Fate as Andrey Shurkov
- 2005 The State Counsellor as Nikolai Seleznov / Rakhmet
- 2006 Filipp's Bay as Booth
- 2006 Dikari as Baron
- 2007 12 as 9th Juror
- 2008 Little Moscow as Major KGB
- 2008 Stilyagi as Labukh
- 2008 He Who Puts Out the Light as Alexey Sautin
- 2009 The Inhabited Island as Shurin
- 2009 L'affaire Farewell as Choukhov
- 2009 I Am as Romanian, drug dealer
- 2010 The 5th Execution as General
- 2010 The Edge as Kolivanov
- 2010 The House of the Sun as Boris Pavlovich Kapelsky
- 2011 The PyraMMMid as Colonel
- 2012 Moms as telephone cheater
- 2012 Atomic Ivan as Ivan's father
- 2012 Spy as Selentsov
- 2012 Eastalgia as Zhora
- 2013 Möbius as Korzhov
- 2013 Khaytarma as Krotov
- 2013 Shuler as Leonid Balaban
- 2013 Sherlok Kholms as Professor Moriarty / The Cabman
- 2014 Trubach as Vasily Petrovich, artistic director of the orchestra
- 2014 Son as Father as Georgiy Teodorady, The Arbitrator of the organised crime
- 2014 Leningrad 46 as The Musician
- 2015 National Guard as Oleksiy
- 2015 Locust as Kavtorang
- 2018 The Wild Fields as Pastor
- 2021 The Last Mercenary
- 2024-2025 Juvenile Inspektor: The Shadow Over Jõhvi

== Television ==
- 2018 The Bureau (Le Bureau des Légendes), season 4 and 5 as Karlov
