= Tender Age (2000 film) =

2000 film by Sergei Solovyov

- Directed by: Sergei Solovyov
- Written by: Sergei Solovyov; Dmitri Solovyov
- Produced by: Nikita Mikhalkov; Leonid Vereshchagin
- Starring: Dmitri Solovyov; Sergei Garmash
- Narrated by: Sergei Solovyov
- Cinematography: Pavel Lebeshev
- Edited by: Vera Kruglova
- Music by: Boris Grebenshchikov; Enri Lolashvili
- Production company: TriTe
- Release date: June 2000
- Running time: 130 min.
- Country: Russia
- Language: Russian

Tender Age (Russian: Нежный возраст, romanized: Nezhniy vozrast) is a 2000 Russian drama film directed by Sergei Solovyov.

== Plot ==
The story of one man growing up in a new market-mafia social life, the story of his love for the daughter of his parents' friends, who becomes a famous Parisian top model, relationships with whom go through the hero's life.

== Cast ==
- Dmitri Solovyov as Ivan Gromov
- Sergei Garmash as Semyon Bespalchikov
- Valentin Gaft as Saledon Sr.
- Kirill Lavrov as grandfather
- Ludmila Savelyeva as grandmother
- Nikolai Chindyajkin as psychiatrist
- Andrey Panin as captain Okunkov
- Elena Kamaeva as Lena
- Irina Grigorieva as sexy teacher
- Boris Grebenshchikov as cameo
