= Masha (2004 film) =

- Russian: Маша
- Directed by: Sergey Tkachev
- Written by: Linda Schreyer; Sergey Tkachev
- Starring: Mariya Shalayeva; Dmitry Shevchenko; Nataliya Tkachyova
- Cinematography: Sergey Tkachev
- Edited by: Sergey Tkachev
- Release date: 2004
- Country: Russia
- Language: Russian

Masha (Russian: Маша) is a 2004 Russian comedy-drama film directed by Sergey Tkachev.

== Plot ==
Muscovite Masha goes to Paris to her father, who saw her only in early childhood. His girlfriend Natasha helps them better understand each other and he is forced to rethink his life.

== Cast ==
- Mariya Shalayeva as Masha (as Masha Shalayeva)
- Dmitry Shevchenko as Dima
- Nataliya Tkachyova as Natasha
