= Medea (2022 Russian film) =

- Directed by: Igor Voloshin
- Written by: Vasily Sigarev
- Produced by: Polina Zadorozhnaya; Roman Borisevich
- Cinematography: Grigoriy Rudakov
- Music by: Aleksandr Kopeykin
- Production companies: KinoPrime, Plan 9, 25-y kadr
- Distributed by: Atmosfera Kino
- Release date: 1 December 2022
- Running time: 91 minutes
- Country: Russia
- Language: Russian
- Budget: 108,633,963 ₽
- Box office: 13,754,783 ₽

Medea (Russian: «Медея») is a Russian horror film directed by Igor Voloshin. The film premiered at the author's film festival Zimniy on 1 December 2022 and was released theatrically on 16 March 2023.

== Plot ==
The main character Liza is abandoned by her husband for a young lover. When the husband’s beloved cat dies, he starts suspecting Liza of killing it. A mysterious woman tells Liza that her family is cursed and that all children in her bloodline are doomed to die (Liza has two sons). Allegedly, the only way to avoid this fate is to abandon her children. Liza herself was raised in an orphanage—according to the woman, her mother left her for the same reason.

Liza decides the stranger is an actress hired by her husband to gain custody of the children after divorce. The black comedy then shifts into horror: it becomes unclear whether Liza harbours an evil force or is being overtaken by it, or if she is developing a mental disorder. The film unfolds as a sequence of frightening, exaggerated yet believable events.

== Cast ==
- Olga Simonova as Liza
- Nikita Kolpachkov as Yarik
- Kirill Kolpachkov as Misha
- Pavel Derevyanko as Alexey, Liza’s ex-husband
- Paulina Andreeva as Alexey’s girlfriend
- Oleg Vasilkov as trauma doctor
- Svetlana Pismichenko as aunt
- Andrey Sharkov as landlord
- Lidiya Dorotenko as landlord’s mother
- Kirill Polukhin as neighbor
- Helga Filippova as woman in the hospital yard

== Reception ==
Dmitry Bortnikov, in his review for RussoRosso, praised the film, noting that Medea stands out from other horror films thanks to its technical qualities (sound, music, visuals) and characters from dreams and hallucinations that evoke more fear than CGI or animatronics. He compared the film to Creature and Dead Daughters, saying that Medea draws viewers with these parallels, with relationships between characters, the growing sense of horror, fear and madness, its view on religion, and its multilayered imagery. He also praised the actors: Olga Simonova for making viewers empathize with the morally ambiguous Liza; the Kolpachkov brothers for evoking sympathy despite playing spoiled, misbehaving children; and Kirill Polukhin and Oleg Vasilkov for portraying significant, multifaceted characters. Pavel Derevyanko and Paulina Andreeva appeared in short but vivid roles.

Sergey Ugolnikov, writing for the newspaper Zavtra, praised the film’s technical aspects but questioned the point of its creation, calling it “an attempt to sell psychologist advertising” and “a moralizing mess,” with an ending that spoiled the entire film.
