= Fedya. Narodnyy futbolist =

- Directed by: Nikolay Akelkin
- Written by: Ilya Kazakov
- Produced by: Aleksey Akhmedov; Anton Ivashevich; Ilya Kazakov
- Starring: Stas Rumyantsev; Dmitry Kalikhov; Nikolai Fomenko; Boris Shcherbakov; Aleksandra Drozdova; Igor Petrenko; Olga Fadeeva
- Cinematography: Dmitriy Trifonov
- Edited by: Serik Beyseu
- Music by: Michael Afanasyev
- Production company: Ivan Production
- Distributed by: NMG Film Distribution
- Release date: October 31, 2024 (Russia)
- Running time: 126 min.
- Country: Russia
- Language: Russian

Fedya. Narodnyy futbolist (Russian: Федя. Народный футболист; lit. 'Fedya. People’s Football Player') is a 2024 Russian biographical sports drama film directed by Nikolay Akelkin. It stars Stas Rumyantsev, Dmitry Kalikhov and Nikolai Fomenko. This film was theatrically released on October 31, 2024.

== Plot ==
The film shows a Soviet football player named Fyodor Cherenkov, who quickly bursts into the main squad of Spartak, where he meets the stars of Soviet football. Fyodor instantly becomes the country's leading football player, but as a result of a series of failures, he faces severe psychological difficulties.

== Cast ==
- Stas Rumyantsev as Fyodor Cherenkov
  - Dmitry Kalikhov as Cherenkov in childhood
- Nikolai Fomenko as Konstantin Beskov
- Boris Shcherbakov as Nikolai Starostin
- Aleksandra Drozdova as Olga, Cherenkov's wife
- Igor Petrenko as Cherenkov's father
- Olga Fadeeva as Cherenkov's mother
- Sergey Migitsko as doctor
- Sergey Chudakov as Valery Lobanovsky

== Production ==
Filming began in May 2023 in Moscow.

Roman Vorobyov served as Rumyantsev's stunt double in the football scenes. Aleksandr Borodyuk served as the film's consultant.

Anastasia, Fyodor Cherenkov's daughter, plays the role of her relative in the film.

== Critical response ==
Aleksey Litovchenko of KinoReporter Magazine (the former Russian-language version of Hollywood Reporter) noted: "Sometimes football movies are made by people who know nothing about football. And sometimes football movies are made by people who know nothing about cinema. That's how this film turned out".
