= My Friend from Faro =

- Directed by: Nana Neul
- Written by: Nana Neul
- Produced by: Hejo Emons
- Starring: Anjorka Strechel; Lucie Hollmann; Manuel Cortez
- Cinematography: Leah Striker
- Music by: Jörg Follert
- Release dates: 16 January 2008 (Max Ophüls Festival); 30 October 2008 (Germany)
- Running time: 90 minutes
- Country: Germany
- Languages: German; Portuguese

My Friend from Faro (German: Mein Freund aus Faro) is 2008 German drama film. It is the directorial debut of Nana Neul and stars Anjorka Strechel and Lucie Hollmann. The film premiered on 16 January 2008 at the Max Ophüls Festival, and was awarded the Fritz Raff Screenplay Award.

== Plot ==
Mel, an androgynous teenage tomboy in a dead end job, is obsessed with everything Portuguese. When she meets Jenny, Mel quickly decides that the only way to build a relationship with her is by assuming the alter ego of a Portuguese boy.

== Cast ==
- Anjorka Strechel - Mel Wandel
- Lucie Hollmann - Jenny Schmidt
- Manuel Cortez - Nuno
- Florian Panzner - Knut Wandel
- Tilo Prückner - Willi Wandel
- Isolda Dychauk - Bianca
