= The Port (film) =

- Directed by: Aleksandra Strelyanaya
- Written by: Aleksandra Strelyanaya
- Produced by: Aleksandr Kotelevskiy; Andrey Novikov
- Starring: Aleksei Guskov; Yuri Borisov; Mariya Borovicheva; Vladimir Daraganov; Lev Semashkov; Mikhail Evlanov; Irina Vilkova
- Cinematography: Aleksandr Laneev
- Edited by: Anna Mass
- Production company: Kinokompaniya 'Invada Film'
- Release date: 19 November 2019
- Country: Russia
- Language: Russian

The Port (Russian: Порт, romanized: Port) is a 2019 Russian drama film directed and written by Aleksandra Strelyanaya.

== Plot ==
The film tells about the daughter of boxing trainer, Cyrus, who had an accident. Her father created a simulator for her, sincerely believing that she would be able to return to her former life. In the meantime, a certain Andrei comes to the hall, and Kira immediately falls in love, which returns her will to life and hope that everything will work out.

== Cast ==
- Aleksei Guskov
- Yuri Borisov
- Mariya Borovicheva
- Vladimir Daraganov
- Lev Semashkov
- Mikhail Evlanov
- Irina Vilkova
