= Igor Voloshin =

Russian film director

- Born: Igor Pavlovich Voloshin
- Occupations: Actor, film director, screenwriter, producer, cinematographer, artist
- Years active: 2001–present

Igor Pavlovich Voloshin (born 1 July 1974, Sevastopol, USSR) is a Russian theatre and film actor, film director, screenwriter, producer, cinematographer and artist. He is the husband of actress Olga Simonova.

== Biography ==
Igor Voloshin was born on 1 July 1974 in Sevastopol.

He studied at a music school, majoring in guitar. He also practiced judo, becoming a candidate for master of sports. After finishing secondary school in 1991, he unsuccessfully attempted to enter a medical institute.

In 1992, he began working at the youth dramatic "Theatre on Bolshaya Morskaya" as a cashier. Two months later he was accepted as an actor into the company. The same year, he entered the Sevastopol branch of the Yaroslavl Theater Institute.

During his studies from 1993 to 1994, Voloshin participated in the punk band "Delicacies," and later—from 1996 to 1998—was the leader of the psychedelic jazz orchestra of the same name.

In 1996, he graduated with a degree in "Theatre and film acting.”

From 1997 to 1998, he worked as an actor, playwright, and director in a closed experimental laboratory at the theatre.

In 1998, he entered VGIK (Gerasimov Institute of Cinematography), initially the program of additional professional education in the screenwriting workshop of V. K. Chernykh and L. A. Chernykh. In 1999, he transferred to the workshop of author's film directing.

He graduated from VGIK in 2000 with a degree in "Film directing.”

At Sverdlovsk Film Studio he directed the short films Suka (2001, documentary) and Hunting Hares (2003, fiction).

Starting in 2003, he worked as a location director on the reality show Golod ("Hunger"). The same year, together with Leonid Fyodorov of Auktyon, he participated in the recording of the album Gory i Reki ("Mountains and Rivers").

In 2004, Voloshin received the youth prize "Triumph".

In 2005, the film Lips (Guby) was presented at the International Film Festival in Rotterdam. The festival's Hubert Bals Fund awarded Voloshin and co-author Alexei Shipenko a grant to write a screenplay.

== Filmography ==
=== Actor ===
- 2003 – Odyssey. Year 1989 – Lens
- 2013 – Fast Train: Moscow–Russia – “Koryesh”
- 2021 – Kosa – Andreas, Eva’s father

=== Director ===
==== Feature films ====
- 2008 – Nirvana
- 2009 – Belyaev (co-directed with Nikolay Khomeriki)
- 2009 – Olympius Inferno
- 2009 – I Am
- 2011 – Experiment 5ive (segment "Atlantika")
- 2011 – Bedouin
- 2013 – Fast Train: Moscow–Russia
- 2018 – The Basement
- 2021 – Possessed
- 2022 – Lord of the Wind
- 2022 – Medea
- 2025 – The Wizard of the Emerald City
- 2026 – Buratino

==== Television ====
- 2016 – Olga
- 2017 – Fizruk (Season 4)
- 2019 – The 1990s: Loud and Fun
- 2021 – Kosa
- 2022 – Snake-Handler

==== Short films ====
- 2003 – Hunting Hares (short; based on a story by Kenji Maruyama)
- 2007 – Goat (short)

==== Documentary films ====
- 1999 – Mesivo
- 2001 – Suka

=== Screenwriter ===
- 1999 – Mesivo
- 2001 – Suka
- 2005 – Lips
- 2009 – I Am
- 2011 – Experiment 5ive (segment "Atlantika")
- 2011 – Bedouin
- 2013 – Fast Train: Moscow–Russia
- 2022 – Lord of the Wind

=== Producer ===
- 2011 – Bedouin
- 2013 – Fast Train: Moscow–Russia
- 2018 – The Basement

=== Cinematographer ===
- 2001 – Suka (documentary)

=== Production designer / Artist ===
- 2003 – Hunting Hares (short; based on Kenji Maruyama)

== Awards ==
- For the film Mesivo
- For the film Suka
  - “Debut. Kinotavr" International Film Festival – Special Jury Mention (2001)
  - IDFA (Amsterdam) – Best Debut and FIPRESCI Prize (2001)
  - Oberhausen International Festival – Special Jury Mention and Ecumenical Jury Prize (2002)
  - Participant of INPUT conference, Rotterdam (2002)
- For the film Hunting Hares
  - Mexico International Film Festival – Jury Prize and Best Music (2004)
  - Valencia International Film Festival – Special Jury Mention (2004)
  - "Golden Knight" Film Festival – Best Cinematography (2004)
- For the film Goat
  - "Kinotavr" – Best Short Film (2007)
- For the film Nirvana
  - "Kinotavr" – Best Debut (2008)
  - "White Elephant" Award – Best Production Design (2008)
  - Grand Prix TEXAS IFF (2009)
  - Los Angeles AFI Film Fest – Special Jury Mention (2009)
- For the film Fast Train: Moscow–Russia
  - “Golden Phoenix” Festival – Special Prize named after Yuri Nikulin “for good humor and an ironic view of reality”
