= Ksenia Khairova =

Soviet and Russian actress

- Born: 29 March 1969 (age 57); Moscow, Russian SFSR, USSR
- Years active: 1990-present
- Spouse: Khairov
- Children: Anastasia (born 1998)

Ksenia Leonidovna Khairova (Russian: Ксе́ния Леони́довна Хаи́рова, née Talyzina (Russian: Талы́зина); March 29, 1969) is a Soviet and Russian stage and film actress.

== Biography ==
=== Early life ===
She was born in Moscow on March 29, 1969. Her parents were artist Leonid Nepomnyashchy and actress Valentina Talyzina who were divorced shortly after her birth.

She attended a school with an intensive foreign-language program and now speaks three languages.

In 1990 she graduated GITIS (Yevgeni Lazarev's rate).

=== Career ===
She began her acting work in 1990, playing a small role in the movie Nikolai Vavilov.

Since 1993 she is an actress TSATRA and now largely plays in TV series.

=== Personal life ===
She is divorced from Khairov and has his child, daughter Anastasia Talyzina (born in 1998). Second husband — Yuri.

== Selected filmography ==
- 1975 — Afonya as daughter
- 1990 — Nikolai Vavilov as episode
- 1992 — Our American Borya as Anna
- 1997 — At the Dawn of a Misty Youth as Anna
- 2004 — Opera. The Chronicles of slaughter as episode
- 2005 — You are My Happiness as Alexandra Fyodorovna
- 2006 — Airport-2 as Svetlana
- 2006 — Detectives 5 as Tatyana Totsiltsina
- 2006-2007 — Race for Happiness as Larisa Dronova
- 2007 — Daughters-Mothers as Natalya
- 2008 — Life Which was Not as wife of foreigners
- 2008 — Hour of Volkov 2 as Lyudmila Tikhomirova
- 2009 — City of Temptations as Olga Diamond
- 2009 — Given Circumstances as Regina Sergeyevna
- 2009 — Footprints in the Sand as Nadezhda
- 2009 — Trace as Alyona Pimenova
- 2010 — Vote as Marina Ryabova
- 2010 — Love and Gold as episode
- 2010-2011 — Institute for Noble Ladies as Lidia Sokolova
- 2013-2018 — SashaTanya as Izolda Venediktovna, psychologist
