= Nirvana (2008 film) =

- Russian: Нирвана
- Directed by: Igor Voloshin
- Written by: Olga Larionova
- Produced by: Sergey Selyanov
- Starring: Olga Sutulova; Mariya Shalayeva; Artur Smolyaninov; Mikhail Evlanov; Andrey Khabarov
- Cinematography: Dmitriy Yashonkov
- Edited by: Tatyana Kuzmicheva
- Music by: Alexander Kopeikin
- Production company: CTB Film Company
- Distributed by: Nashe Kino
- Release date: 12 February 2008
- Running time: 93 min.
- Country: Russia
- Language: Russian
- Box office: $273 137

Nirvana (Russian: Нирвана) is a 2008 Russian drama film directed by Igor Voloshin. This was the final film of Tatyana Samoylova.

== Plot ==
The story takes place in Russia in the early 2000s. A young woman named Alisa moves to Saint Petersburg in search of a better life. She finds work as a nurse and rents a room in a perpetually dark apartment, where her neighbors are drug users — a bartender named Vel and her boyfriend, Valera “Myortvyy” (“Dead”). Disillusioned with people, Vel trusts only herself; the one person who still tries to support her is Valera. However, he begins an affair with Alisa, and Vel soon discovers the betrayal, resulting in escalating conflict between the two women. Their relationship changes when Alisa later saves Vel’s life, leading to an unexpected friendship.

Around this time, Valera disappears. Vel assumes he has gone off on another binge, but it is soon revealed that he has been kidnapped by criminals to whom he owes a large debt. They send Vel his severed finger and demand payment for his release. Alisa helps Vel raise the money, risking her own life in the process, and the two go into debt to gather the required sum. After Valera is freed, Vel sells her motorcycle to repay part of what they owe. Valera attempts to disappear again but is confronted by Alisa, who tries to stop him. She later realizes that he has stolen the money from the motorcycle sale and tries unsuccessfully to chase him down.

Soon afterward, Vel dies of a drug overdose. She appears to Alisa as a hallucination brought on by Alisa’s own heavy drug use, telling her to leave drugs behind and predicting she will live a long life. Vel urges her to leave Saint Petersburg for Moscow. When Alisa regains clarity, she packs her belongings and leaves the apartment. The film ends with a view of a Saint Petersburg street as Alisa walks away into the distance.

== Cast ==
- Olga Sutulova as Alisa
- Mariya Shalayeva as Val
- Artur Smolyaninov as Valera
- Mikhail Evlanov as Larus
- Andrey Khabarov as Boll
- Tatyana Samoylova as Margarita Ivanovna
- Leonid Voron as рoliceman
