= Our Own (2004 film) =

- Directed by: Dmitri Meskhiyev
- Written by: Valentin Chernykh
- Produced by: Viktor Glukhov
- Starring: Konstantin Khabenskiy; Sergey Garmash; Bohdan Stupka
- Cinematography: Sergei Machilsky
- Edited by: Marina Vasilyeva
- Music by: Svyatoslav Kurashov
- Production company: SLOVO
- Release date: 11 November 2004 (Russia)
- Running time: 111 minutes
- Country: Russia
- Language: Russian
- Budget: $2,500,000
- Box office: $120,000 (Russia)

Our Own (Russian: Свои, romanized: Svoi) is a 2004 Russian action drama film directed by Dmitri Meskhiyev.

== Plot ==
In October 1941, the Soviet Union is experiencing an invasion by Nazi Germany. Despite Soviet resistance, the Germans occupy large parts of the country. In a so far unoccupied part of the disputed Pskov Region, an NKVD officer (Sergey Garmash) arrives at an officer's building and speaks to a NKVD officer, handing him the documents of a fallen Red Army soldier. Suddenly, a grenade explodes and German special assault troops enter the building and open fire. "Checkist" and his NKVD comrade, a political instructor called "Livshits" (Konstantin Khabensky) flee and, amid the chaos and gunfire, discard their uniforms in a local laundry, knowing that German troops shoot Red Army commanders, officers, political commissars and Jews. Eventually, they are caught by soldiers from a German motorized infantry unit and led westward along with many other prisoners.

After marching for a time, the German soldiers stop and allow the prisoners to eat. Livshits is threatened by a fellow prisoner who blackmails him into giving him his food by threatening to denounce him to the Germans, who would shoot him as a Jew and a commissar. However, the blackmailer's throat is then cut by "Checkist" and he dies. After eating, the prisoners resume their march. Livshits, "Checkist" and a young Soviet sniper Mitya Blinov (Mikhail Evlanov) decide to escape and successfully flee the German soldiers. The three protagonists find shelter in Blinov's home village, Blyany, where his father Ivan Blinov (Bogdan Stupka) still lives. Blinov Snr allows the three escapees to hide in his barn. "Checkist" suspects that Blinov Sr. is a pro Nazi policeman, but Blinov Sr. himself admits to being a village chief who is 'working' for the Germans and cites how he was unjustly deported to internal exile by the Soviet regime. The villages have found a way to manage their own interests. Arguments and conflicts appear between "Checkist" and Blinov Sr but the situation calms down and the men begin to cooperate.

The threat of being reported and arrested by the Germans lead the three protagonists to kill a local policeman who is working under the German occupation authorities and is a possible traitor, called Mishka. They stab him to death with a knife made for slaughtering pigs, push his body and bike in a river and keep his Mosin-Nagant rifle. A week later, they kill two German motorcyclists in a forest five km from Blyany, capturing a German MG 34 machine gun and French cognac. These actions capture the attention of the local police chief Nikolai (Fedor Bondarchuk). He leads a raid through the five villages under his control and takes a number of relatives of Soviet soldiers hostage, among them Blinov Sr's daughters, all of whom are imprisoned in a local school and threatened with execution in reprisal for the deaths of the German motorcyclists if the culprits are not produced. Blinov Sr. seeks to negotiate with the police chief who is willing to set his daughters free and pardon his son if Blinov Sr. gives his daughter-in-law Katerina (Anna Mikhalkova) to him as a wife and leads the police chief to the escaped prisoners. Blinov Sr learns that at least one hostage has been bought out but this is not an option for his daughters.

Blinov Sr. sees that the negotiations have failed and returns to his village and arranges with "Checkist" and Livshits to shoot the police chief. When he comes to the village with his men, they open fire but the police chief survives and flees to his neighboring village of Kurtsevo and calls a German hunter squad for help. The three protagonists flee into the Eastern forests of Pskov region, Livshits is wounded and sacrifices himself to allow the others to escape. They go to Kurtsevo and, from afar, the sniper Mitya kills the police chief. Blinov Snr turns on the Chekist, who declares himself to be one of them. Blinov Snr lets him go and tells his son to follow him and protect his homeland. Alone, Blinov Snr must return to his village to try to buy his daughters' freedom with two Tsarist gold coins.

== Cast ==
- Konstantin Khabenskiy – Livshits, political instructor/politcommissar
- Sergey Garmash – NKVD-Officer a.k.a. "Checkist"
- Ben Perino – Tank Commander
- Mikhail Evlanov – Mitya Blinov, the Soviet sniper
- Bohdan Stupka – Ivan Blinov, father of Mitya and village chief
- Natalya Surkova – Anna
- Anna Mikhalkova – Katerina
- Fedor Bondarchuk – Police master

== Reception ==
The film was positively received by critics. Leslie Felperin from Variety wrote in her review: "Back in the Soviet era, WWII films were as central to Russian cinema as cabbage was to the national diet, but they have long since fallen out of fashion. Dmitri Meskhiyev's "Us," a strong-backed meller with A-list Russian cast, retrofits the genre with a macho swagger for a new generation, but keeps plenty of moral ambiguity in reserve."

== Awards ==
The film won the Golden George Award for Best Film at the 26th Moscow International Film Festival in June 2004. Meshiev also won the award for Best Director and Bohdan Stupka won the award for Best Actor.

At the 2004 Russian Guild of Film Critics Awards the film received the prizes for Best Film, Best Script (Valentin Chernykh), Best Male Actor (Bogdan Stupka) and Best Female Supporting Actor (Natalia Surkova).
