= Bohdan Stupka =

Ukrainian actor (1941–2012)

Hero of Ukraine People's Artist Merited Artist Bohdan Stupka
- Богдан Ступка
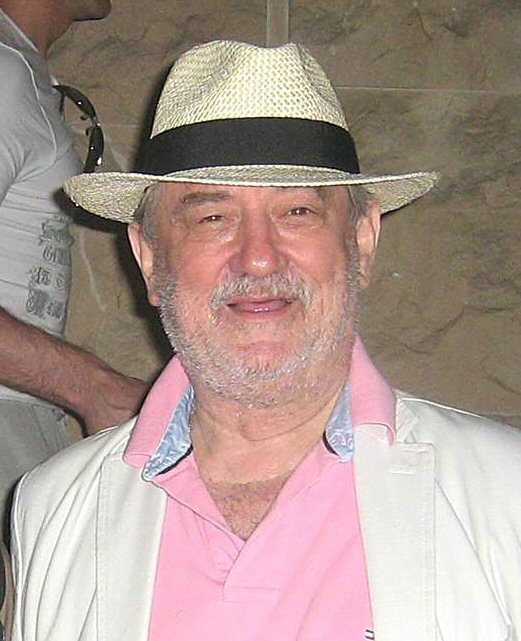
- Stupka in 2008
- Born: Bohdan Sylvestrovych Stupka; 27 August 1941; Kulykiv, General Government, Nazi Germany (now Ukraine)
- Died: 22 July 2012 (aged 70); Kyiv, Ukraine
- Burial place: Baikove Cemetery, Kyiv
- Education: Maria Zankovetska Theatre
- Occupation: Actor
- Years active: 1961–2012
- Spouse: Larysa Stupka (m. 1967)
- Children: 1 (Ostap)

Minister of Culture
- In office 30 December 1999 – 31 May 2001
- President: Leonid Kuchma
- Prime Minister: Viktor Yushchenko
- Preceded by: Yuriy Bohutsky
- Succeeded by: Yuriy Bohutsky

Bohdan Sylvestrovych Stupka (Ukrainian: Богдан Сильвестрович Ступка; 27 August 1941 – 22 July 2012) was a Ukrainian actor of theatre and film. He was among Ukraine's most prominent leading actors during his lifetime and among the last prominent Soviet actors in Ukrainian film. Stupka received a variety of awards and accolades, including the titles of People's Artist of the USSR and Hero of Ukraine and the Shevchenko National Prize. He served as minister of culture from 1999 to 2001, under prime minister Viktor Yushchenko.

Stupka was born to a singer from the Lviv Theatre of Opera and Ballet, and he spent his early life under German occupation during World War II. After failing to enter the University of Lviv, he began his acting career at Lviv's Maria Zankovetska Theatre in 1961. Stupka broke out in film in The White Bird Marked with Black (1971) as co-lead opposite Ivan Mykolaichuk, obtaining additional renown for his portrayal of Richard III in the Shakespeare play of the same name. Stupka contributed significantly to the development of Jerzy Hoffman's 1999 film With Fire and Sword, and portrayed Bohdan Khmelnytsky in the film. As an actor, Stupka received international acclaim for his depiction of hetman Bohdan Khmelnytsky in the film, and he increasingly worked in Russian films in his later career, drawing criticism in Ukraine. Since his death, monuments have been erected and places renamed in Stupka's honour.

== Early life ==
Bohdan Sylvestrovych Stupka was born on 27 August 1941 in the village of Kulykiv, then under German occupation as part of the General Government. His father, Sylvestr Dmytrovych Stupka, was a singer at the Lviv Theatre of Opera and Ballet, while his mother Mariia was a peasant and a supporter of the Ukrainian cooperative movement who worked at a grocery cooperative in Kulykiv. Mariia and Sylvester had met as part of an event held in Kulykiv by Prosvita, a cultural organisation devoted to preserving and strengthening Ukrainian culture. The Stupka family was deeply traditional adherents of the Ukrainian Greek Catholic Church, and chose the name Bohdan (lit. 'child of God') either due to the circumstances of his birth (being the family's only child after years of trying) or after the 17th-century Ukrainian leader Bohdan Khmelnytsky.

The Stupka family lived through the German occupation through subsistence agriculture. Kulykiv was subjected to bombardment and artillery shelling, and Bohdan later recalled witnessing mass killings perpetrated by both the German occupiers and the NKVD, in one instance avoiding being killed by German soldiers by playing dead. At the age of seven, his family moved to Lviv, where Sylvestr had returned to work as an employee of the Theatre of Opera and Ballet. Bohdan saw performances at the theatre on a weekly basis, becoming acquainted with Natalka Poltavka and Faust.

Stupka studied at Middle School 4 in Lviv (now the Lviv Linguistic Gymnasium). After graduating from secondary school, he attempted to enter the faculty of chemistry at the University of Lviv, but failed the entrance examination. Subsequently, he worked at the university's observatory and as a computer engineer.

== Career ==
=== Theatre career ===
Stupka joined the Maria Zankovetska Theatre in Lviv on 1 May 1961, where he was trained in acting by Serhii Danchenko. According to academic Oksana Palii, Stupka's first role was in Borys Tiagno's 1960 production of Oleksandr Levada's play Faust and Death, where he portrayed the robot Mekhantrop. Other early roles included a side role in Richard III. Early in his acting career, Stupka faced some criticism from theatre critics such as Borys Poiurovskyi, who argued that Stupka's mannerisms in other roles were too similar to the rock and roll-inspired behaviour of Mekhantrop in Faust and Death. Stupka later remarked in a 1995 interview to The Ukrainian Weekly that at this time he became obsessed with rock and roll music, particularly the works of Elvis Presley, and that he considered leaving acting completely to become a rock singer. From 1963 to 1966, Stupka took a break from acting after being conscripted in the Soviet Army, where he served for three years in the Carpathian Military District.

In 1973, Stupka played the titular role in Shakespeare's Richard III, which Palii describes as his breakthrough role. From 1989, he played Tevye in Fiddler on the Roof, touring throughout Ukraine, the United States and Canada. In recognition of his acting in Fiddler on the Roof, Stupka was awarded the Shevchenko National Prize in 1993. He also toured the United States in 1995, playing Poprishchin in a stage adaptation of Nikolai Gogol's "Diary of a Madman". After Danchenko's 2001 death, Stupka took up his position as director of the Ivan Franko National Academic Drama Theatre in Kyiv. He held the position until his death.

=== Film debut and stardom ===
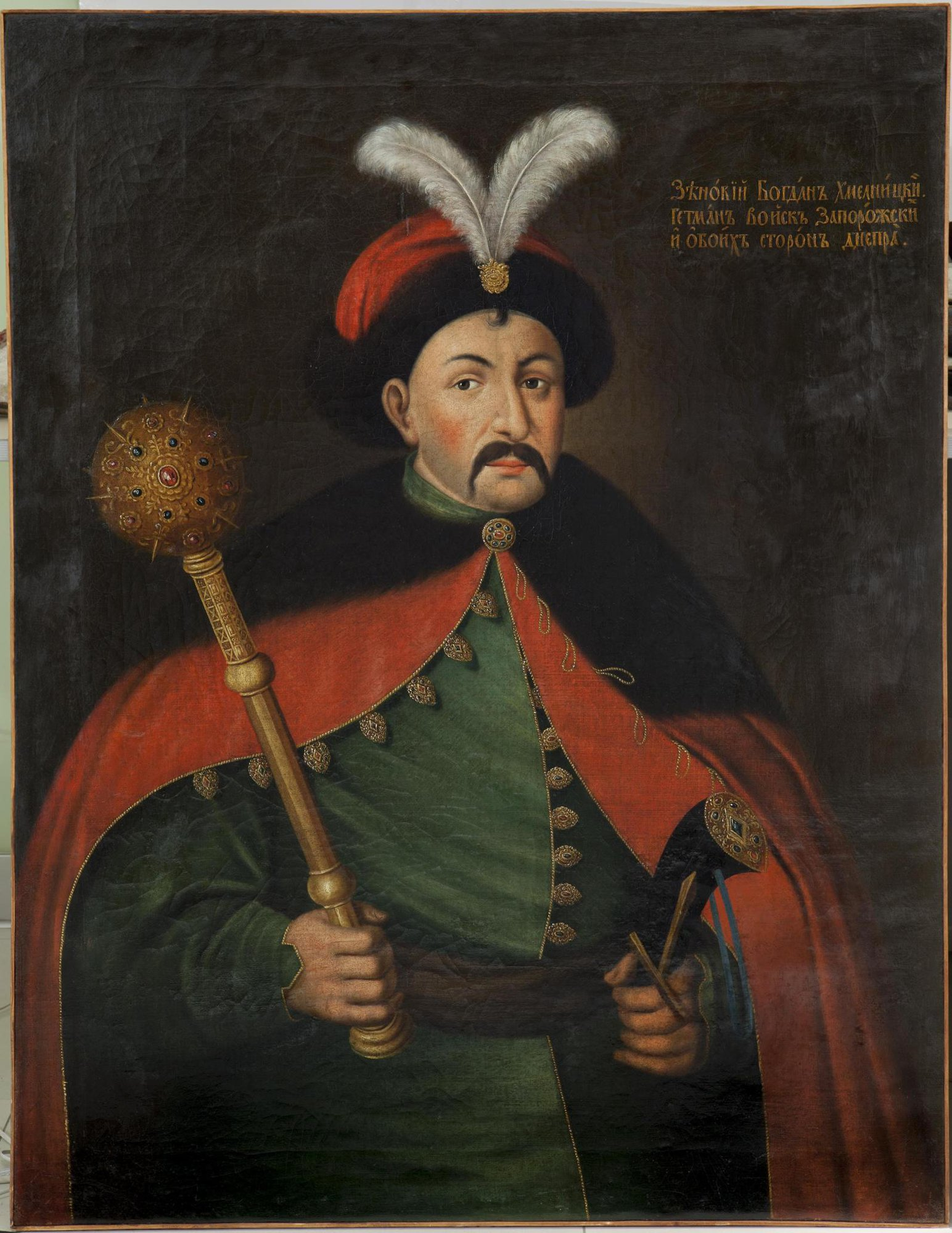
Stupka's portrayal of Bohdan Khmelnytsky in the 1999 adaptation of With Fire and Sword was positively received in Poland and Ukraine

Stupka first found a film role in Yuri Ilyenko's The White Bird Marked with Black (1971), opposite Ivan Mykolaichuk, as Orest, a member of a Bukovinan peasant family who joins the Ukrainian Insurgent Army. Mykolaichuk, who had written the film's script, envisioned himself as Orest, but this was blocked by Soviet censors, who were reluctant to allow him to again play a nationalist role after his previous depiction of Taras Shevchenko in The Dream (1964). The film was a critical success, winning the gold prize at the Moscow International Film Festival. Stupka recounted to The Ukrainian Weekly in 1995 that the film had nearly been banned by the Communist Party of Ukraine as "religious propaganda" for its neutral depiction of a priest, but that First Secretary Petro Shelest intervened to ensure its release. Stupka acted in several Soviet films during the 1970s and 1980s, as well as the television series Stolen Happiness.

In the early 1990s, Stupka provided narration for a documentary series by Leonid Anichkin on Ukrainian theatre figures who were part of the Executed Renaissance. Stupka later remarked that the theatrical style of Les Kurbas was taught to him via Tiahno, who himself had been mentored by Kurbas.

Stupka, by this time a prominent leading actor, was recruited to work on Jerzy Hoffman's adaptation of the 1884 Henryk Sienkiewicz novel With Fire and Sword by the spring of 1997. As a condition of joining the cast, Stupka demanded that Hoffman adapt the text to provide greater representation to the Ukrainian perspective of the Khmelnytsky Uprising, to which Hoffman agreed. News of Stupka's role in the film angered audiences in Ukraine, where With Fire and Sword is often seen as the most anti-Ukrainian text in Sienkiewicz's Trilogy, and he was branded as a "traitor" by nationalist publicists.

In contrast to Ukrainian expectations, who believed the film would closely follow the original novel and that Stupka would portray a minor character, Hoffman's adaptation of With Fire and Sword saw him acting as Bohdan Khmelnytsky, the main antagonist and chief Ukrainian character. The film went to lengths to illustrate the Ukrainian position, inserting an extended passage in which Stupka (as Khmelnytsky) condemned the feudal conditions that drove the uprising. Stupka was given creative freedom to portray Khmelnytsky, and his choice to depict Khmelnytsky as a charismatic, down-to-earth statesman cognisant of the social causes of the uprising was met with positive acclaim from Ukrainian audiences, contrasting with Sienkiewicz's original portrayal of Khmelnytsky as a womanising drunkard. was positively received by Polish and Ukrainian audiences alike, and served to further Poland–Ukraine relations, which had begun to improve after the Revolutions of 1989 in contrast to their previously acrimonious nature. The film was also an international box office success, with 12,000 viewing the film in the New York metropolitan area within three weeks of its theatrical release.

=== Later film roles ===
After With Fire and Sword, Stupka again played a Cossack leader as Ivan Mazepa with Ilyenko's A Prayer for Hetman Mazepa, which at 12 million Ukrainian hryvnias was the most expensive film in Ukraine's history to date. In order to finance the film, Stupka utilised his position as minister of culture to lobby for increased state funding, but the cost of dubbing proved too great at the time of the film's release in 2001. It was played at the 2002 Berlinale and the Polish Film Awards, where it was positively received, but it was a box office failure. The film was banned in Russia due to depicting homosexuality, particularly through a scene of Tsar Peter the Great raping a male soldier. Stupka later expressed his discontentment towards the film, a fact that film critic Serhii Trymbach attributes to friction with Ilyenko and their mutual inability to get along.

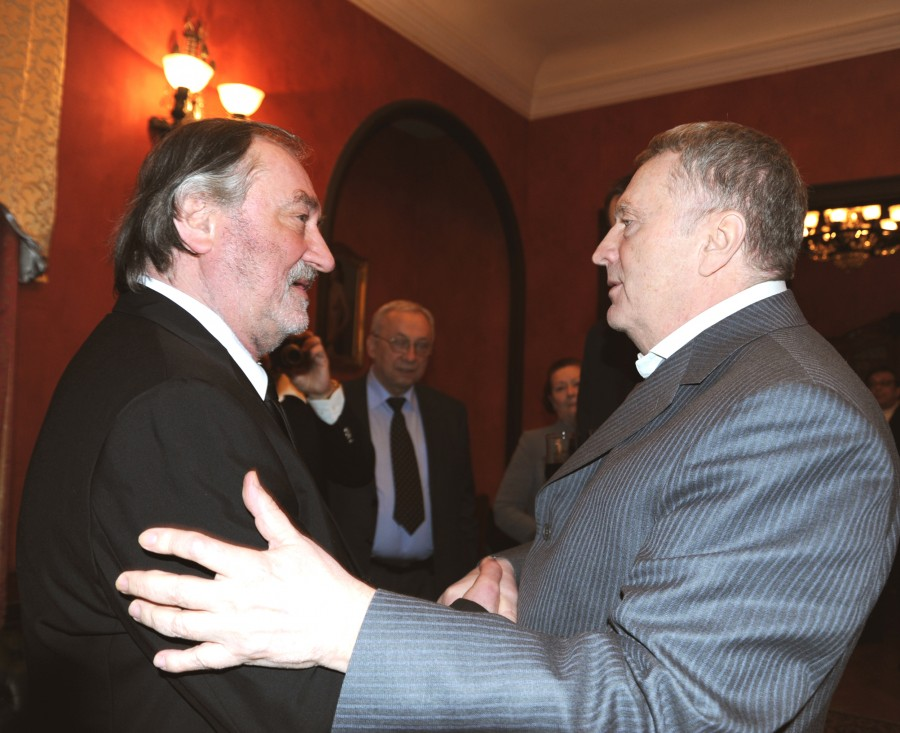
Stupka shaking hands with Russian ultranationalist politician Vladimir Zhirinovsky at the premiere of Taras Bulba (2009). The film was controversial in Ukraine for its Russian nationalist themes, and was banned in 2014.

Stupka played the eponymous lead in the 2009 film Taras Bulba, directed by Vladimir Bortko with funding from the Russian Ministry of Culture. Bortko's film was intended to be a Russian response to With Fire and Sword, and prior to its release it was a source of controversy for its anti-Western and Russian nationalist themes. The production of Taras Bulba resulted in a diplomatic spat, with Bortko claiming ahead of the film's release that "There is no separate Ukraine" and that "Russia, Belarus and Ukraine are one nation". Ukrainian politicians boycotted the film's release, and film critic Volodymyr Voitenko was quoted by The New York Times as saying that "It's a very imperial film", arguing that portions of it resembled "leaflets for Putin". Because of Stupka's presence in the cast, the film enjoyed a presence on Ukrainian television until its 2014 ban.

In February 2008, Polish director Krzysztof Zanussi told Gazeta.ua that Stupka was playing a Ukrainian oligarch in his upcoming dark comedy film Serce na dłoni. Zanussi has said of the role that he sought for it to be played by a Ukrainian actor, and that he viewed Stupka as "perfectly" playing it. Stupka's role in the film was positively received, and, at the Rome Film Festival that year, he was awarded the title of best actor.

Stupka's involvement with the Russian film industry in the later years of his career drew public criticism, as did his closeness to the government of Viktor Yanukovych. Trymbach has defended Stupka, noting that much of his earlier career had also been spent outside Ukraine, and that Ivan Mykolaichuk avoided criticism despite similarly playing Russian roles. During celebrations of the 20th anniversary of Ukrainian independence in 2011, Yanukovych awarded Stupka with the title of Hero of Ukraine.

== Activism ==
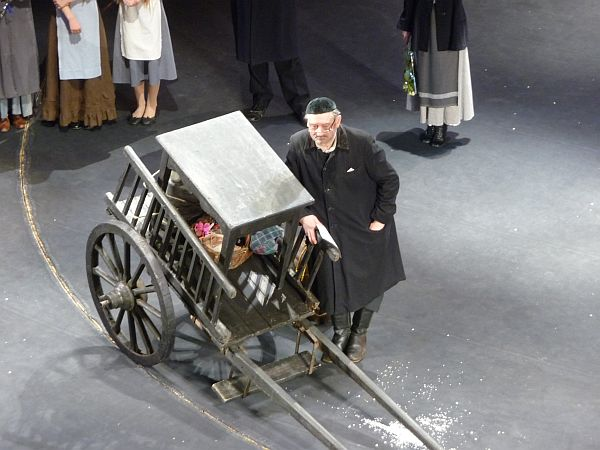
Stupka as Tevye during a production of Fiddler on the Roof, 2009. Stupka campaigned for improved communal relations between Ukrainians and Jews, and was often believed to be Jewish.

During his lifetime, Stupka was an advocate for improved interethnic relations between Ukrainians and Poles and Jews. He was part of a delegation of actors present at a 5–6 October 1991 event commemorating the Babi Yar massacre, alongside Chaim Topol, Cliff Robertson and Tony Randall. The commemoration was the first such event in Ukraine to depict the Babi Yar massacre as a genocidal massacre specifically targetting Jews, in contrast to previous Soviet historiography which denied the role of Jews in the massacre. At the event, Stupka, Topol, Robertson and Randall read from the 1944 Black Book of Soviet Jewry, which had first been published in the Soviet Union earlier that year. In 1995, Stupka provided the narration for A New Day Will Come, a documentary on Jewish–Ukrainian communal relations, and, as he noted to The Ukrainian Weekly, acted in a film depicting the Beilis affair and state antisemitism in the Russian Empire. Stupka was often believed to have Jewish ancestry, a claim that Trymbach notes was assisted by his role as Tevye in Fiddler on the Roof and the high Jewish population of Kulykiv before the war. Trymbach has described attempts to depict Stupka as a Jew as an effort to deny Stupka's connections to Ukraine.

Shortly before his death, Stupka dictated a letter to his son Ostap, requesting that it be delivered to president Viktor Yanukovych following his death. Public speculation at the time suggested that it may have been an effort to call upon Yanukovych to veto the Kivalov–Kolesnichenko law, which established legal precedent for the official usage of the Russian language in eastern Ukraine. Hanna Herman, adviser to Yanukovych, denied this was the case, stating that it was primarily concerned with the future of theatre.

=== Minister of Culture (1999–2001) ===
In December 1999, Stupka was appointed minister of culture by prime minister Viktor Yushchenko. The Yushchenko government, which had been appointed by president Leonid Kuchma as a result of pressure from Ukraine's Western allies (chiefly the United States) to more aggressively pursue economic and political reforms after the 1999 Ukrainian presidential election, also included literary historian Mykola Zhulynskyi as deputy prime minister; Stupka's appointment, alongside that of Zhulynskyi, marked increased attention to Ukrainisation than the Ukrainian government had previously afforded and increased Yushchenko's popularity in patriotic and nationalist circles. Stupka later remarked negatively about his time as minister of culture, comparing it to tension on a film set, and preferred to describe his work in the office as "minister of defence of culture".

== Personal life and death ==
Stupka married a woman named Larysa Semenivna in 1967. The two have one son, Ostap, who is also an actor. Stupka told The Ukrainian Weekly in 1995 that he was a fan of the music of Elvis Presley and Wolfgang Amadeus Mozart, describing the latter as "real music for the ages [...] an eternal classic". He was also a passionate fan of FC Dynamo Kyiv, frequently attending the club's games, and used club manager Valeriy Lobanovskyi's behaviour as inspiration in his acting. Stupka was known for his penchant for straw hats, and maintained a collection that he often wore in public.

Stupka became ill with bone cancer in 2010, and Trymbach has posited that Stupka's health was significantly impacted during the filming of Taras Bulba, which was filmed with a tight schedule during a hot summer. In January 2011, while attending an event alongside Yanukovych at Pochaiv Lavra, during Yanukovych's tour of western Ukraine, Stupka collapsed and was flown to Munich, in Germany, for treatment. On 8 February 2011, prime minister Mykola Azarov allocated for 550,000 hryvnias to be provided for Stupka's medical treatment. Stupka died on 22 July 2012 at Feofaniia Hospital in Kyiv, as a result of a heart attack caused by his cancer. His death was announced by his son Ostap. Historian Mayhill Flower notes that at the time of his death, Stupka "may have been one of the last surviving Soviet Ukrainian stars". Following his death, Azarov and Yanukovych announced the formation of a government body to organise his funeral procession. Stupka's funeral, held at the Ivan Franko National Academic Drama Theatre on 24 July, drew a crowd of thousands, including Yanukovych and writer Ivan Drach. Former presidents Leonid Kuchma and Viktor Yushchenko were also in attendance. He was buried at Baikove Cemetery in Kyiv.

== Awards ==
- Shevchenko National Prize for Tevye in Fiddler on the Roof (1993)
- Kyiv Pectoral Award in the category "Best Male Role", play by Irena Kowal: ("The Lion and the Lioness") (2001)
- Golden Aries Award in the category "Best Male Role" (Our Own) (2004)
- Silver George prize of the Moscow International Film Festival "Best Male Role" (Our Own) (2004)
- Golden Eagle Award in the category "Best Supporting Actor" (A Driver for Vera) (2005)
- Nika Award in the nomination "Best Male Role" (Our Own) (2005)
- Golden Eagle Award in the category "Best Male Role in Cinema" (Taras Bulba) (2010)
- Golden Eagle Award in the category "Best Supporting Actor" (Home) (2012)

== Selected filmography ==
- 1971: White Bird with Black Mark as Orest
- 1971: Insight as Yuriy Morozenko
- 1972: Contrary to Everything as Simeon
- 1973: The Last Day as Valera
- 1973: Housewarming as Danko
- 1975: Waves of the Black Sea as Troyan
- 1977: The Right for Love as Yakov
- 1979: Forget the Word "Death"' as Ivan Ostrovoy
- 1980: Dudaryky as Leontovich
- 1980: Otherwise it is Impossible as master Petushkov
- 1981: From the Bug to the Vistula as conjurer
- 1982: Red Bells II as Kerensky
- 1982: Secrets of St. George as Oleksa
- 1983: Whirlpool as Ioska Vikhor
- 1984: Everything Starts with Love as Antonyuk
- 1984: Stolen Happiness as Mikhailo Zadorozhny
- 1986: Start an Investigation as Stasenko
- 1987: Daniel, Prince of Galicia as Sudich
- 1988: Stone Soul as Sergey Muratov
- 1988: Dress Rehearsal as Vasili Gogol-Yanovsky
- 1990: Nikolai Vavilov as Trofim Lysenko
- 1991: Kremlin Secrets of the 16th Century as Boris Godunov
- 1991: The Sin as Stalynskiy
- 1992: For Home Fire as Hirsch, police officer
- 1992: God, Forgive Us Sinners as Tsibukin
- 1992: Four Sheets of Plywood, or Two Murders in a Bar as police colonel
- 1992: Taras Shevchenko. Testament as host
- 1993: The Gray Wolves as Vladimir Semichastny
- 1993: Fuchzhou as Matvii Kosht
- 1993: The Road to Paradise as academician Vladimir Naumovich Lerner
- 1993: Trap (TV Series) as Stalsky
- 1995: Single Player as Pavel Kondratievich
- 1995: Gelli and Nok as Gutan
- 1996: Judenkreis, or Eternal Wheel as Liberzon
- 1999: With Fire and Sword as Bohdan Khmelnytsky
- 1999: East/West as colonel Boyko
- 1999: Chinese Service as Lapsin
- 2002: A Prayer for Hetman Mazepa as Ivan Mazepa
- 2003: An Ancient Tale: When the Sun Was a God as Popiel
- 2004: Our Own as Ivan Blinov
- 2004: A Driver for Vera as general Serov
- 2005: Stealing Tarantino as Feliks Dobrzhansky
- 2006: Rabbit Over the Void as Leonid Brezhnev
- 2007: Two in One as Andrei
- 2007: Three and Snowflake as Andrew's Father
- 2007: 18-14 as Vasily Malinovsky
- 2008: Sappho as professor Orlov
- 2008: Alexander as prince Yaroslav
- 2008: Serce na dłoni as Konstanty
- 2009: Taras Bulba as Taras Bulba
- 2009: Insight as old man
- 2010: Chantrapas as ambassador Firsov
- 2010: Ivanov as Pavel Kirillyich Lebedev
- 2010: Platon Anhel (TV Movie) as Platon Nikitich Anhel
- 2011: Brothel Lights as Zaslavsky
- 2011: Home (Russia) as Grigory Ivanovich Shamanov
- 2011: Rejection as Ivan Pavlovich
- 2013: Podporuchik Romashov as Shulgovich
- 2015: 12 Months. New Fairy Tale as December (final film role)

== Commemoration ==
- Streets in the cities of Vinnytsia, Bucha, Boryspil, Zhytomyr, Zaporizhzhia, Synelnykove, Tavriisk, Pokrovsk, and Sloviansk are named in his honor.
- Asteroid 269252 Bogdanstupka, discovered on the night of Bohdan Stupka's 67th birthday at the Andrushivka Astronomical Observatory, was named in his honour.
- On 5 October 2016, Ukrposhta introduced into circulation a postage stamp dedicated to Bohdan Stupka, and the first day covers were canceled with a special commemorative stamp in Lviv and Kyiv post offices.
- On the occasion of the actor's 75th birthday in 2016, the Bohdan Stupka Museum Room was opened in the building of the People's House in Kulykiv.
- For the 76th anniversary of his birthday in 2017, a bust of Bohdan Stupka was installed near the building of the People's House in Kulykiv, Zhovkva district, Lviv Oblast.
- On August 27, 2021, on the occasion of the actor's 80th birthday, a bas-relief and a memorial plaque with a miniature sculpture were unveiled on Mary Zankovetska Street in Kyiv.
- In May 2022, in the city of Horodok, Khmelnytskyi Oblast, Tukhachevsky Street was renamed Bohdan Stupka Street.
