= Dmitry Meskhiev =

Russian film director (born 1963)

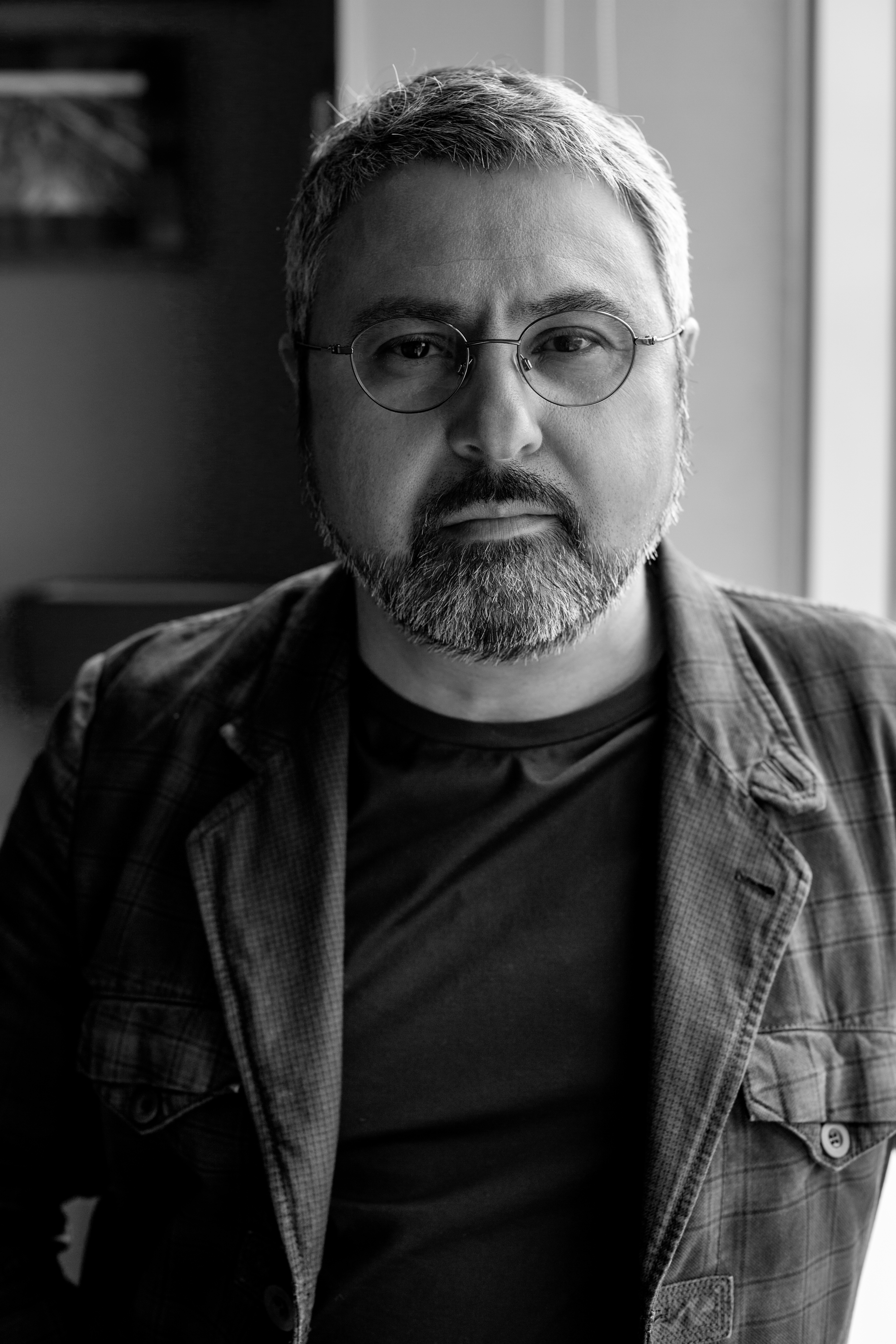
- Meskhiev in 2014
- Born: 31 October 1963 (age 61); Leningrad, Russia
- Occupation: Film director
- Known for: Our Own (2004); Battalion (2015)

Dmitry Dmitriyevich Meskhiev (Russian: Дмитрий Дмитриевич Месхиев, born 31 October 1963) is a Russian film director. His 2004 film Our Own won the Golden George at the 26th Moscow International Film Festival, and his 2015 work Battalion won four out of nine nominations at the 2015 Golden Eagle Awards. He is the son of the Soviet cameraman Dmitry Meskhiev Sr.

== Selected filmography ==
Film
Year	Title	Notes
1991	Cynics	
1992	Over the Dark Water	
1997	American Bet	
1999	Women's Property	
2001	Mechanical Suite	
2003	Peculiarities of National Politics	
2003	Lines of Fate	TV
2004	Our Own	
2015	Battalion	
