= Cinema of Russia =

- No. of screens: 4,372 (2016)
  - Per capita: 2.1 per 100,000 (2011)
- Main distributors: United Pictures (27.7%); The Walt Disney Company (24.4%; as of 2021): In 2022, several major international film distributors, including The Walt Disney Company, Sony Pictures, Universal Pictures, Paramount Pictures and Warner Bros stopped screening films by themselves in Russia in response to the 2022 Russian invasion of Ukraine, however Atmosfera Kino took over distribution for all their titles later in 2022.

Produced feature films (2016)
- Total: 101

Number of admissions (2016)
- Total: 193,500,000
  - Per capita: 1.2 (2012)
- National films: 32,100,000 (16.8%)

Gross box office (2016)
- Total: US$722.5 million
- National films: 15.5%

The cinema of Russia refers to the film industry in Russia, engaged in production of motion pictures in Russian language.

It began in the Russian Empire, widely developed in the Soviet Union and in the years following its dissolution. The Russian film industry would remain internationally recognized. In the 21st century, Russian cinema has become known internationally with films such as Hardcore Henry (2015), Leviathan (2014), Night Watch (2004) and Brother (1997). The Moscow International Film Festival began in Moscow in 1935. The Nika Award is the main annual national film award in Russia.

== Cinema of the Russian Empire ==
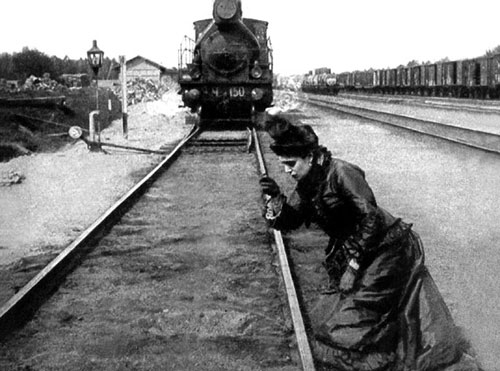
Maria Germanova in Anna Karenina (1914)

The first films seen in the Russian Empire were brought in by the Lumière brothers, who exhibited films in Moscow and St. Petersburg in May 1896. That same month, Lumière cameraman Camille Cerf made the first film in Russia, recording the coronation of Nicholas II at the Kremlin.

Aleksandr Drankov produced the first Russian narrative film Stenka Razin (1908), based on events told in a folk song and directed by Vladimir Romashkov. Among the notable Russian filmmakers of the era were Aleksandr Khanzhonkov and Ivan Mozzhukhin, who made Defence of Sevastopol in 1912. Yakov Protazanov made Departure of a Grand Old Man (1912), a biographical film about Lev Tolstoy.

Animation pioneer Ladislas Starevich made the first Russian animated film (and the first stop motion puppet film with a story) in 1910 – Lucanus Cervus. His other stop-motion shorts The Beautiful Leukanida (1912) and The Cameraman's Revenge (1912), produced for Aleksandr Khanzhonkov, are also among the first animated films. In the following years, Starevich made shorts based on fables such as The Grasshopper and the Ant (1913), as well as World War I propaganda films.

Olga Preobrazhenskaya was the first woman director of Russia. In 1916 she made her directorial debut Miss Peasant. However, the film has been lost. In the Soviet era she directed Women of Ryazan (1927).

During World War I, imports dropped drastically, and Russian filmmakers turned out anti-German, nationalistic films. In 1916, 499 films were made in Russia, more than three times the number of three years earlier.

The Russian Revolution brought more change, with a number of films with anti-Tsarist themes. The last significant film of the era, made in 1917, was Father Sergius by Yakov Protazanov and Alexandre Volkoff. It would become the first new film release of the Soviet era.

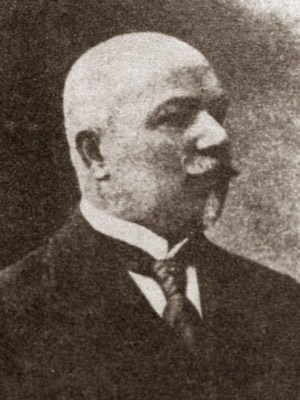
Vasiliy Goncharov, a pioneer of the film industry

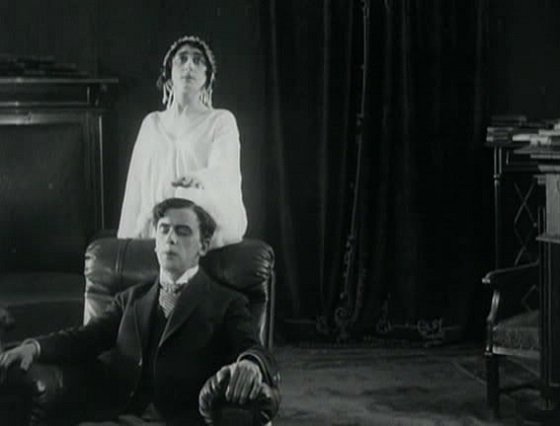
Vitold Polonsky and Vera Karalli in Yevgeni Bauer's After Death (1915 film)

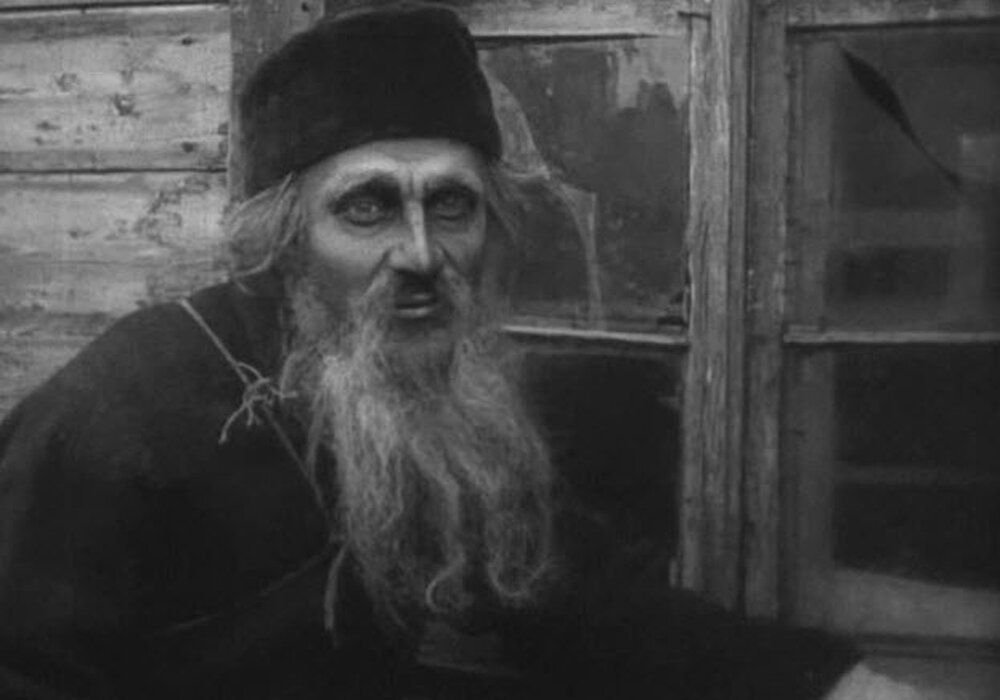
Ivan Mosjoukine as the title character in Volkoff/Protazanov's 1917 film, Father Sergius. It was the last film of the Russian Empire era.

== Cinema of the Soviet Union ==
=== Early Soviet cinema (1917–1953) ===
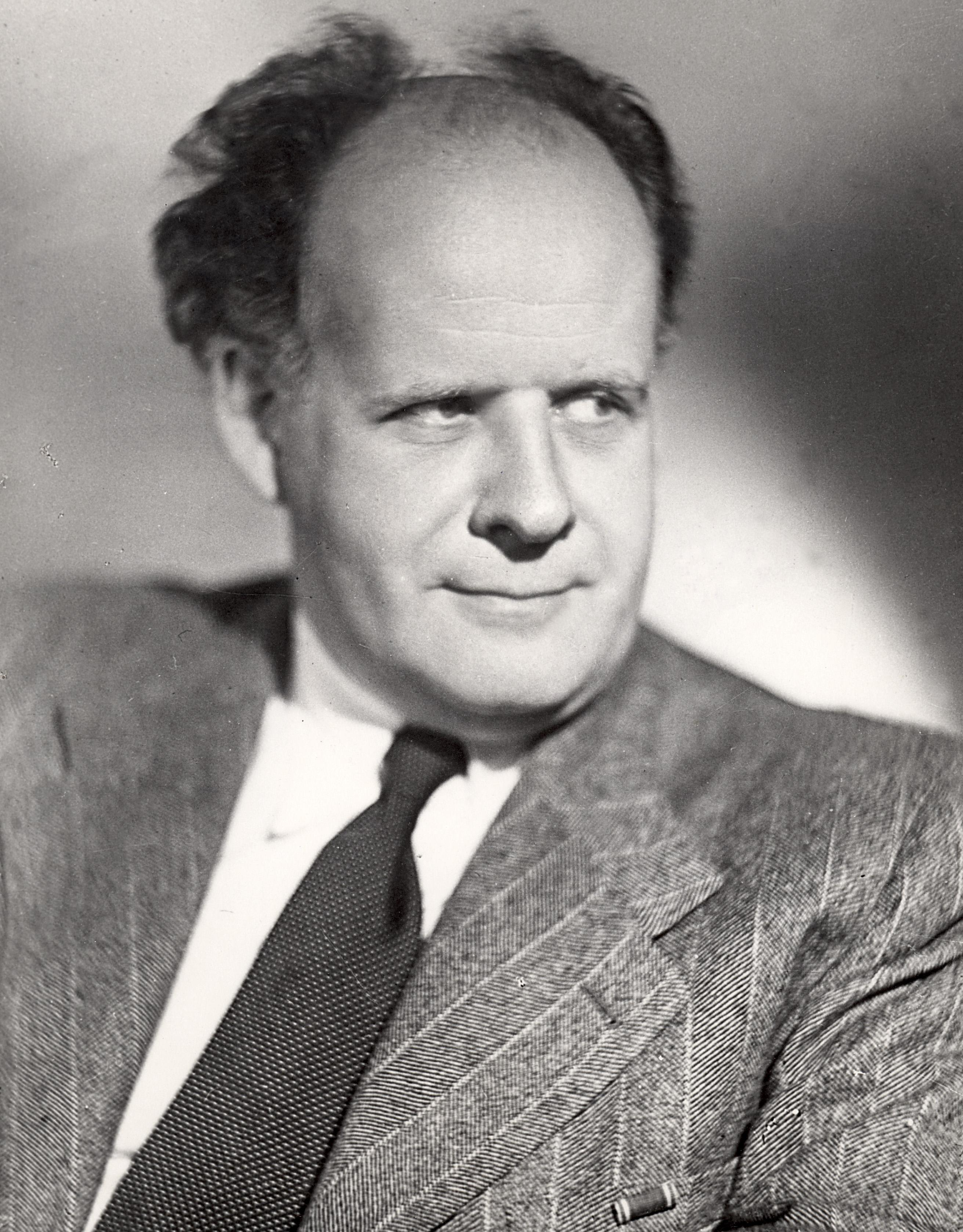
Sergei Eisenstein revolutionized cinema with his use of montage.

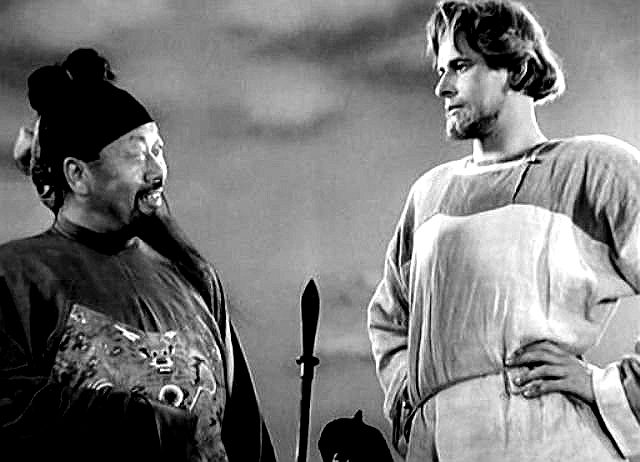
Scene from Eisenstein's Alexander Nevsky (1938)

Vladimir Lenin was the first political leader of the twentieth century to recognize the importance of film. He saw film as a way to unite the nation over which the Bolsheviks, then a minority party of some 200,000 members, had assumed leadership.

The cinema is for us the most important of the arts.

— Vladimir Lenin

His government gave top priority to the rapid development of the Soviet film industry, which was nationalized in August 1919 and put under the direct authority of Lenin's wife, Nadezhda Krupskaya.

One of the first acts of the Cinema Committee was to create a professional film school in Moscow to train directors, technicians, and actors for the cinema. The All Union State Institute of Cinematography was the first such school in the world. Lev Kuleshov, who taught at the school, formulated the groundbreaking editing process called montage, which he conceived of as an expressive process whereby dissimilar images could be linked together to create non-literal or symbolic meaning. His work has been referred to as the Kuleshov effect. Two of Kuleshov's most famous students were Sergey Eisenstein and Vsevolod Pudovkin.

Although Russian was the dominant language in films during the Soviet era, the cinema of the Soviet Union encompassed films of the Armenian SSR, Georgian SSR, Ukrainian SSR, and, to a lesser degree, Lithuanian SSR, Byelorussian SSR, and Moldavian SSR. For much of the Soviet Union's history, with notable exceptions in the 1920s and the late 1980s, film content was heavily circumscribed and subject to censorship and bureaucratic state control.

The development of the soviet film industry was innovative and linked with the Constructivist art movement. In 1922–3, Kino-Fot became the first Soviet cinema magazine and reflected the constructivist views of its editor, Aleksei Gan.

As with much Soviet art during the 1920s, films addressed major social and political events of the time. An important film of this period was Sergei Eisenstein's The Battleship Potemkin, not only because of its depiction of events leading up to the 1905 Revolution, but also because of innovative cinematic techniques, such as the use of jump-cuts to achieve political ends. To this day, Battleship Potemkin is considered one of the greatest films of all time.

Vsevolod Pudovkin developed a new theory of montage based on cognitive linkage rather than dialectical collision. Pudovkin's Mother (1926) was internationally acclaimed for its montage, as well as for its emotional qualities. Later Pudovkin was publicly charged with formalism for his experimental sound film A Simple Case (1932), which he was forced to release without its sound track.

The film is not shot, but built, built up from the separate strips of celluloid that are its raw material.

— Vsevolod Pudovkin

Two other key filmmakers of the Soviet silent era were Aleksandr Dovzhenko and Dziga Vertov. Dovzhenko's best known work is his Ukraine Trilogy, and more specifically the film Earth (1930). Vertov is well known for his film Man with a Movie Camera (1929) and the Kino-Eye theory – that the camera, like the human eye, is best used to explore real life, which had a huge impact on documentary filmmaking.

However, with the consolidation of Stalinist power in the Soviet Union, and the emergence of Socialist realism as state policy, which carried over from painting and sculpture into filmmaking, Soviet film became subject to almost total state control.

Films released in the 1930s include the popular musicals Jolly Fellows (1934), Circus (1936) and Volga-Volga (1938) directed by the longtime collaborator of Sergei Eisenstein, Grigori Aleksandrov. These films starred leading actress of the time Lyubov Orlova, who was also Aleksandrov's wife.

The New Gulliver (1935) by Aleksandr Ptushko is a landmark in stop-motion animation.

In the 1930s and the 1940s Eisenstein directed two historical epics – Aleksandr Nevsky (1938) and Ivan the Terrible (1944). Both films were scored by composer Sergei Prokofiev. Ivan the Terrible is referred to by film historian Yuri Tsivian, as "the most complex movie ever made".

Immediately after the end of the Second World War, the Soviet color films such as The Stone Flower (1947) by Aleksandr Ptushko, Ballad of Siberia (1947), and Cossacks of the Kuban (1949), both by director Ivan Pyryev, were released.

Soviet cinema went into rapid decline after the World War II: film production fell from 19 features in 1945 to 5 in 1952. The situation did not improve until the late 1950s when Soviet films achieved critical success partly as a result, similar to the cinema of other Eastern Bloc countries, for reflecting the tension between independent creativity and state-directed outcomes.

=== Late Soviet cinema (1953–1990) ===
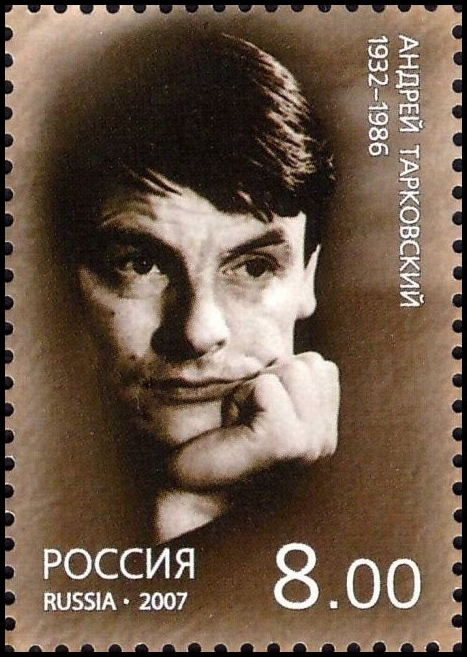
Russian stamp featuring Andrei Tarkovsky

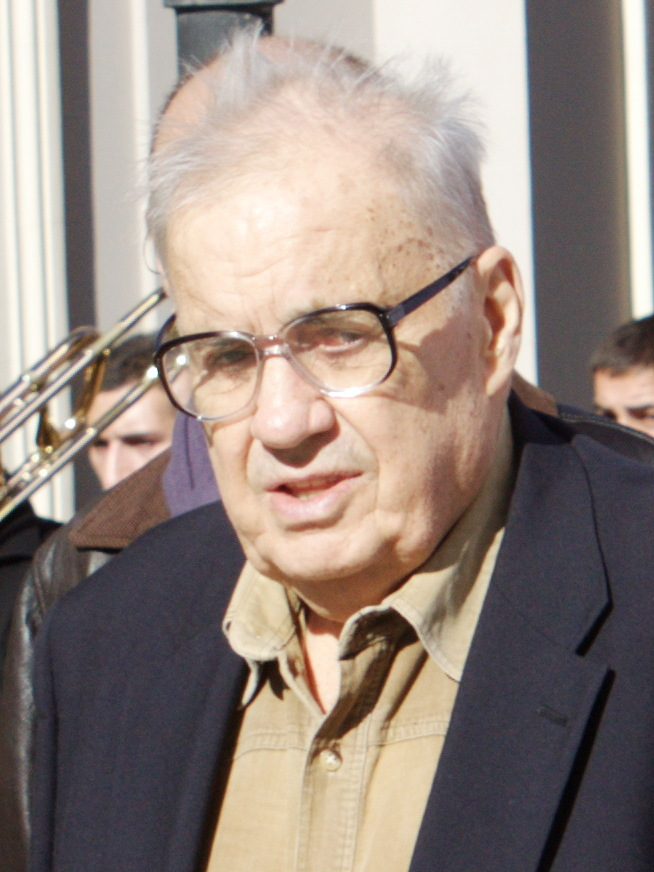
Eldar Ryazanov's romantic comedies and satires were among the most popular late Soviet films.

In the late 1950s and early 1960s Soviet film-makers were given a less constricted environment, and while censorship remained, films emerged which began to be recognised outside the Soviet bloc such as Ballad of a Soldier by Grigory Chukhray which won the 1961 BAFTA Award for Best Film and the 1958 Palme d'Or winning The Cranes Are Flying by Mikhail Kalatozov. The Height (1957) by Aleksander Zarkhi is considered to be one of the best films of the 1950s (it also became the foundation of the Bard movement). Yet, some films did not receive a wide release; The Story of Asya Klyachina (1966) by Andrei Konchalovsky, Commissar (1967) by Aleksandr Askoldov, Brief Encounters (1967) by Kira Muratova and Trial on the Road (1971) by Aleksei German.

The most critically acclaimed Russian director of the 1960s and 1970s was Andrei Tarkovsky, who directed the groundbreaking art-house films Ivan's Childhood, Andrei Rublev, Solaris, Mirror and Stalker. His films won awards at Cannes and Venice Film Festival. His debut film Ivan's Childhood won the Golden Lion award at the Venice Film Festival in 1962. Tarkovsky's film Andrei Rublev (1966) won the FIPRESCI prize at the 1969 Cannes Festival. For Stalker (1979), Tarkovsky won the Ecumenical Jury Prize in Cannes in 1980. He also won the Special Grand Prize for Solaris in 1972 and for Sacrifice at Cannes in 1986.

Other notable Soviet directors include Sergei Bondarchuk, Sergey Paradzhanov, Larisa Shepitko, Kira Muratova, Marlen Khutsiev, Mikhail Kalatozov, Nikita Mikhalkov, Vladimir Menshov and Gleb Panfilov.

The Seventh Companion (1967) marked the debut of film director Aleksei German. Due to Soviet censorship, his film Trial on the Road (1971) was shelved for 15 years. His son Aleksei is also a director.

Sergei Bondarchuk initially came to prominence as an actor. His directorial debut was Fate of a Man which was released in 1959. Bondarchuk is best known for directing and starring in the Academy Award-winning adaptation War and Peace (1967). His son Fyodor Bondarchuk is also a film director and producer.

Among other critically acclaimed literary adaptations from the 1960s was Grigory Kozintsev's Hamlet (1964), winner of the Special Jury Prize at the Venice Film Festival.

Russian actor Nikita Mikhalkov had his feature directorial debut in 1974 with At Home Among Strangers. His brother, Andrey Konchalovsky, is also an award-winning director. Konchalovsky had his directorial debut with The First Teacher in 1965, which won an award at the Venice Film Festival (Best Actress – Natalya Arinbasarova).

Film director Kira Muratova faced censorship during the Soviet era and only started to receive public recognition and first awards during Perestroyka. Her film Among Grey Stones (1983) was screened in the Un Certain Regard section at the 1988 Cannes Film Festival.

Comedy genre was always the most popular one in Russia and the Soviet union with the highest number of box-office successes. Most popular Soviet comedies of the era were directed by Leonid Gaidai, Eldar Ryazanov and Georgiy Daneliya, such as Carnival Night (1956), The Irony of Fate (1976), Kidnapping, Caucasian Style (1967), Operation Y and Shurik's Other Adventures (1965), The Twelve Chairs (1976), Walking the Streets of Moscow (1964), Gentlemen of Fortune (1971).

Soviet filmmakers also produced historical adventure films, such as D'Artagnan and Three Musketeers (1978) and Gardes-Marines, Ahead! (1988). Among those, "osterns", the Soviet take on the westerns, became also popular. Examples of the Ostern include White Sun of the Desert (1970), The Headless Horseman (1972), Armed and Dangerous (1977), A Man from the Boulevard des Capucines (1987). On TV, mystery and spy miniseries were prevalent, such as Seventeen Moments of Spring, The Meeting Place Cannot Be Changed, Investigation Held by ZnaToKi and a faithful adaptation of Sherlock Holmes stories starring Vasily Livanov as Holmes.

A respective amount of World War II dramas made in the 1970s and the 1980s were acclaimed internationally, some of which are Liberation (1971) by Yuri Ozerov, The Dawns Here Are Quiet (1972) by Stanislav Rostotsky, They Fought for Their Country (1975) by Sergei Bondarchuk, The Ascent (1977) by Larisa Shepitko and Come and See (1985) by Elem Klimov.

Co-production between Soviet Union and Japan, Dersu Uzala, adapted from Vladimir Arsenyev's book, directed by Akira Kurosawa and starring Maxim Munzuk and Yuri Solomin, won the Academy Award for Best Foreign Picture in 1976. The film was a box-office success and ended up reviving Kurosawa's career.

Yuri Norstein is perhaps the most famous Russian animator of the Soviet period; his animated shorts Hedgehog in the Fog and Tale of Tales gained worldwide recognition and have served as inspiration for many filmmakers.

Larisa Shepitko's film The Ascent was the first Soviet movie to win the Golden Bear at the Berlin Film Festival in 1977.

Romantic drama Moscow Does Not Believe in Tears by Vladimir Menshov won the Best Foreign Picture award at the 1981 Academy Awards and it was very popular at the Soviet box-office with over 93 million viewers.

Come and See by Elem Klimov received the FIPRESCI prize at the 1985 Moscow Film Festival.

Science fiction film Dead Man's Letters (1986), directorial debut of Konstantin Lopushansky, was screened at the International Critics' Week section of the Cannes Film Festival in 1987 and received the FIPRESCI prize at the 35th International Filmfestival Mannheim-Heidelberg. His follow-up film A Visitor to a Museum (1989) was entered into the Moscow Film Festival where it won the Silver St. George and the Prix of Ecumenical Jury.

In the 1980s Russian director Andrei Konchalovsky was the first filmmaker to find success in Hollywood. In America he directed Maria's Lovers (1984), Runaway Train (1985) and Tango & Cash (1989).

With the onset of Perestroika and Glasnost in the mid-1980s, Soviet films emerged which began to address formerly censored topics, such as drug addiction, The Needle (1988) by Rashid Nugmanov, which starred rock singer Viktor Tsoi, and sexuality and alienation in Soviet society, Little Vera (1988) by Vasili Pichul. However, the industry suffered from drastically reduced state subsidies and the state-controlled film distribution system also collapsed, leading to the dominance of western films in Russia's theatres.

Several Soviet films have received Oscars; War and Peace, Dersu Uzala, Moscow Does Not Believe in Tears.

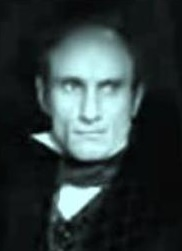
Sergei Gerasimov, whose film school, the oldest in the world, the VGIK, bears his name

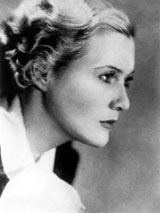
Lyubov Orlova

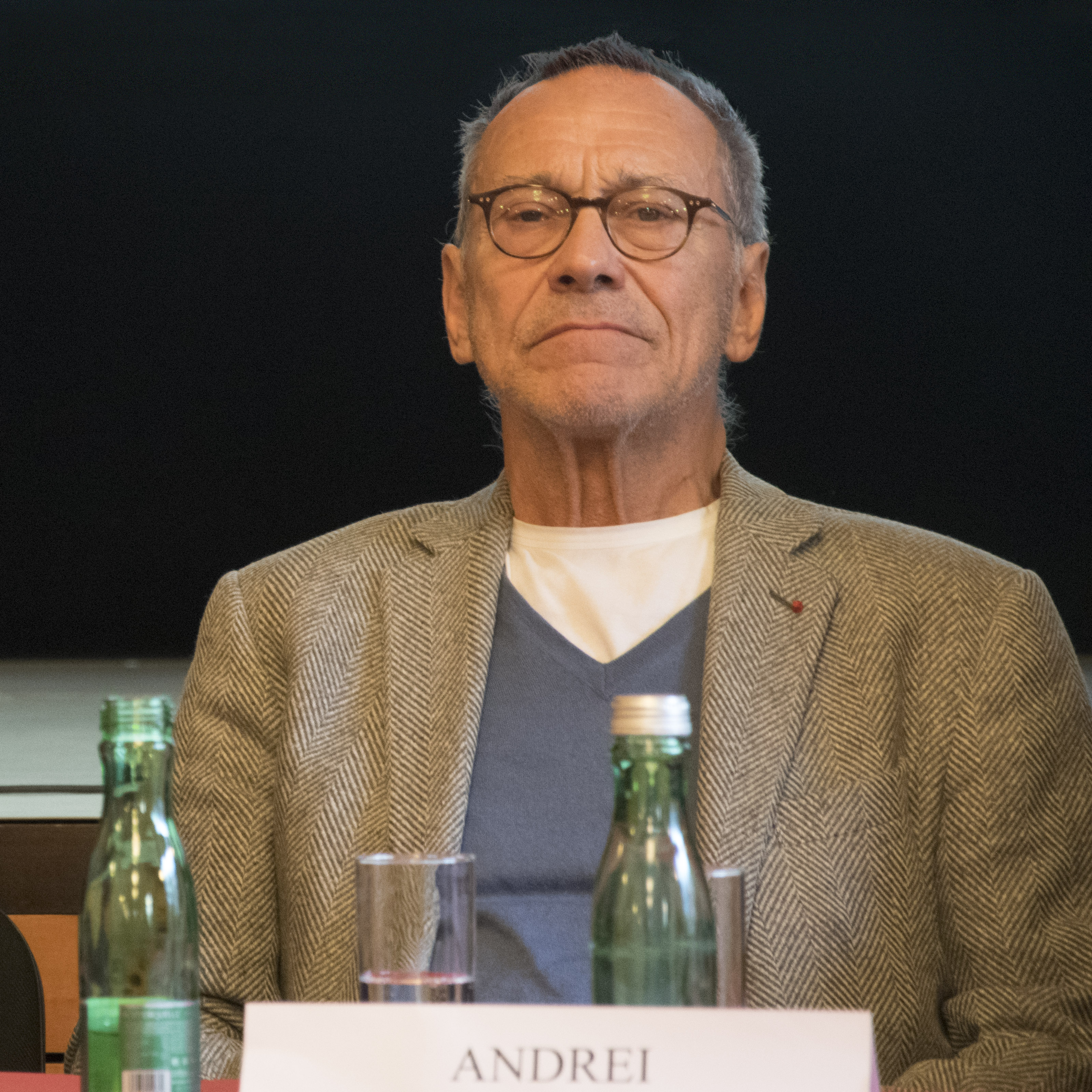
Andrei Konchalovsky

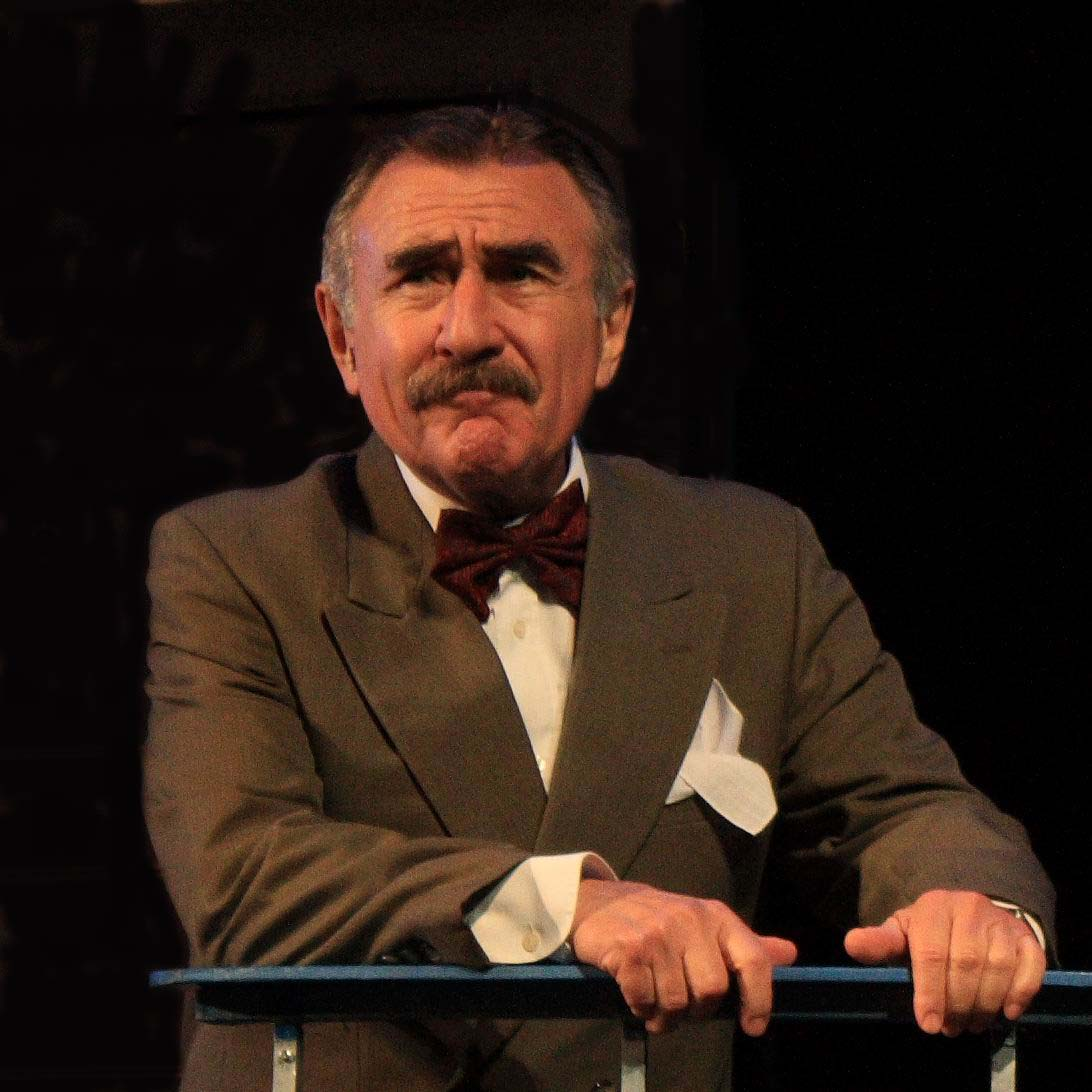
Leonid Kanevsky

== New Russian cinema ==
=== 1990s ===
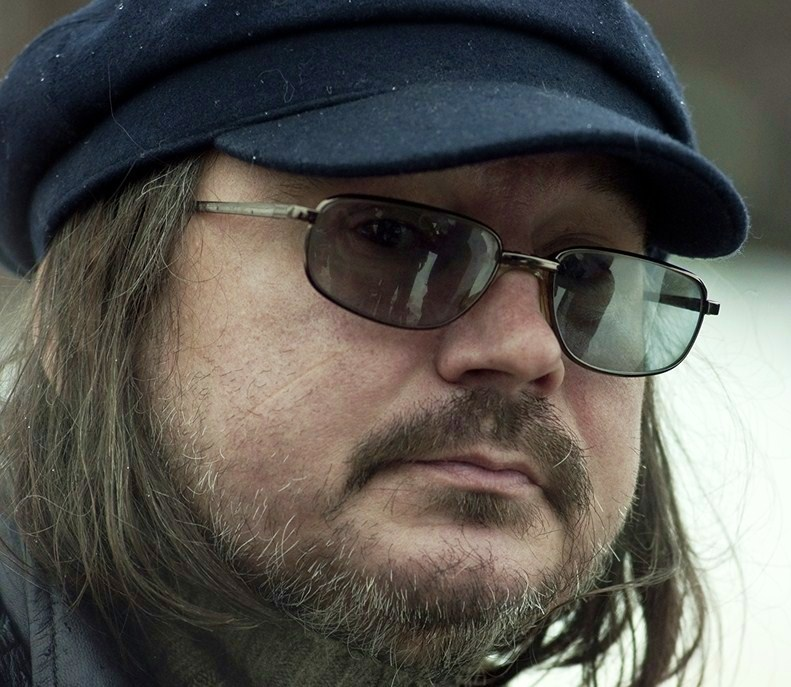
Aleksei Balabanov's crime film duology Brother became a defining example of cult cinema in Russia.

In the 1990s there were much fewer films being made as the cinema industry was experiencing big changes and the economy was uncertain. From 300 in 1990 the number fell to 213 in 1991, 172 in 1992, 152 in 1993, to 68 in 1994, 46 in 1995 and 28 in 1996.

In 1990 censorship was abolished on an official level: the state could no longer interfere in the production and distribution of films, except in cases of war propaganda, disclosure of state secrets, and pornography. As part of the abolition of all central Soviet administrative units, the Cinema Committee of the USSR was dissolved in 1991.

Russian cinema of the 90s acquired new features and themes, with the Chechen war also affecting filmmakers. Many films of that time dealt with war and Stalinism.

Kinotavr was first held in 1990 in Podolsk, and then in 1991 in Sochi, where it has been held ever since. The Nika Award, which is distributed by the Russian Film Academy, was founded in 1998.

The Asthenic Syndrome is a 1989 drama film directed by Kira Muratova. The film was entered into the 40th Berlin International Film Festival where it won the Silver Bear – Special Jury Prize.

Freeze Die Come to Life is 1989 drama film directed by Vitali Kanevsky. It was screened in the Un Certain Regard section at the 1990 Cannes Film Festival, where it won the Caméra d'Or. Another Kanevsky's film, An Independent Life, win the Jury Prize, the third most prestigious award of the event, at the 1992 Cannes Film Festival and also nominated for the Golden Bear at the 42nd Berlin International Film Festival.

In 1990 Pavel Lungin won the Best Director Award for Taxi Blues, which starred rock musician Pyotr Mamonov in the lead role, at the 1990 Cannes Film Festival. Subsequent Lungin films, Luna Park and The Wedding, were screened at 1992 Cannes Film Festival and 2000 Cannes Film Festival in competition. Tsar was screened at 2009 Cannes Film Festival in Un Certain Regard section.

The Guard is a 1990 drama film directed by Aleksandr Rogozhkin. It was entered into the 40th Berlin International Film Festival where it won the Alfred Bauer Prize.

Satan is a 1991 thriller film directed by Viktor Aristov. It was entered into the 41st Berlin International Film Festival where it won the Silver Bear – Special Jury Prize.

The Assassin of the Tsar by Karen Shakhnazarov and Anna Karamazoff by Rustam Khamdamov was entered into the 1991 Cannes Film Festival. Comrade Chkalov Crosses the North Pole by Maksim Pezhemsky was screened in the Un Certain Regard section at the same year.

Nikita Mikhalkov won the Golden Lion at the 48th Venice International Film Festival for Close to Eden and European Film Award for Best Film in 1991 and was nominated for an Academy Award for Best Foreign Film and a Golden Globe for Best Foreign Language Film.

The Inner Circle is a 1991 drama film by Russian director Andrei Konchalovsky, telling the story of Joseph Stalin's private projectionist and KGB officer Ivan Sanchin (real name Alex Ganchin) between 1939 and 1953, the year Stalin died was nominated for awards at the 42nd Berlin International Film Festival.

The Chekist directed by Aleksandr Rogozhkin was a drama set in the period of Red Terror and told the story of a Cheka leader who gradually becomes unhinged. Happy Days directed by Aleksei Balabanov was his feature film debut. Both film were screened in the Un Certain Regard section at the 1992 Cannes Film Festival.

The Sentimental Policeman is a 1992 Russian-language Ukrainian (Ukrainian-French production) comedy film written and directed by Kira Muratova. It entered the competition at the 49th Venice International Film Festival and won the Special Jury Prize at Kinotavr.

Bakhtyar Khudojnazarov won a Silver Lion at the 50th Venice International Film Festival for his film Kosh ba kosh.

The drama Burnt by the Sun (1994) by Nikita Mikhalkov is set in a small countryside community in the time when Stalinism starts to disrupt their idyllic retreat and alter their characters and fates. The film received an Academy Award for Best Foreign Language Film and the Grand Prix du Jury at the 1994 Cannes Film Festival. The sequel, Burnt by the Sun 2: Exodus was entered in the 2010 Cannes Film Festival. Another sequel, Burnt by the Sun 3: The Citadel, released on May 5, 2011.

Assia and the Hen with the Golden Eggs by Andrei Konchalovsky is a satirical sequel to Konchalovsky's 1966 Soviet film, The Story of Asya Klyachina, taking the characters of the original and placing them in a post-Soviet context. This film was entered into the 1994 Cannes Film Festival.

Passions is a 1994 romantic comedy by Ukrainian director Kira Muratova based on the novellas of Boris Dedyukhin. It was screened at the Locarno Festival in 1994. It received two Nika Awards, for Best Picture and Best Director (Muratova). The picture also won the Special Jury Prize of the Kinotavr film festival.

The Life and Extraordinary Adventures of Private Ivan Chonkin directed by Jiří Menzel, international co-production between Russia, Czech Republic, the United Kingdom, France and Italy, was entered the competition at the 51st Venice International Film Festival, in which it won the President of the Italian Senate's Gold Medal.

A Play for a Passenger directed by Vadim Abdrashitov was entered into the 45th Berlin International Film Festival, where it won the Silver Bear.

A Moslem is a 1995 Russian drama film directed by Vladimir Khotinenko won Special Grand Prix of the jury for "Best film of the year" at 1995 Montreal World Film Festival.

Peculiarities of the National Hunt directed by Aleksandr Rogozhkin was screened in Window on Images sectiom at the 52nd Venice International Film Festival and nominated on Crystal Globe at the Karlovy Vary International Film Festival.

In 1996 Sergey Bodrov was screened the war drama film Prisoner of the Mountains based on the 1872 Caucasian War-era short story "The Prisoner in the Caucasus" by the classic Russian writer Leo Tolstoy on 1996 Karlovy Vary International Film Festival and won a Crystal Globe. Latef film was nominated for an Academy Award for Best Foreign Language Film (Russia) and a Golden Globe Award for Best Foreign Language Film (Russia).

Three Stories is a 1997 Russian-Ukrainian comedy film directed by Kira Muratova. It was entered into the 47th Berlin International Film Festival. The picture won the Special Jury Prize at Kinotavr.

In the context of the Russian World War II history Pavel Chukhrai filmed The Thief (1997), a movie about a mother who becomes romantically involved with a criminal who impersonates an officer. The film was awarded with 6 national prizes Nika, got a special prize in 54th Venice International Film Festival and was nominated on European Film Award for Best Film, Academy Award for Best Foreign Language Film and Golden Globe Award for Best Foreign Language Film.

One of the first commercially successful post-Soviet films was the crime drama Brother directed by Aleksei Balabanov. It was screened as part of the Un Certain Regard section at the 1997 Cannes Film Festival. He also directed the sequel Brother 2 in 2000.

Valery Todorovsky's The Country of the Deaf (1998), a comedy film based on the screenplay by Renata Litvinova parodied Russia of the 90s. It described the journey of two female friends caught in the fight of two clans – the deaf and the hearing. It was entered in the 48th Berlin International Film Festival.

In 1997 Aleksandr Sokurov had his international breakthrough with the arthouse drama Mother and Son, the first part of family relationships dilogy. It won the Special Silver St. George at the 20th Moscow International Film Festival in 1997. The second part, Father and Son, Russian drama film that was entered into feature film competition at the 2003 Cannes Film Festival.

1998 film Khrustalyov, My Car! directed by Aleksei German described the last days of Stalinist Russia. It was entered in the 1998 Cannes Film Festival.

In 1998 at the Locarno Film Festival Time of a Dancer, directed by Vadim Abdrashitov, won Special Jury Prize.

Nikita Mikhalkov's international co-production The Barber of Siberia was screened out of competition at the 1999 Cannes Film Festival. The film featured English and Russian actors. It was the first post-Soviet big budget feature film; the film cost 35 million dollars.

Moloch, the first part of tetrology of power directed by Alexander Sokurov portrays Adolf Hitler living life in an unassuming manner during an abrupt journey to the Bavarian Alps, was entered into the 1999 Cannes Film Festival and won the Best Screenplay Award. The second part portraying Vladimir Lenin, Taurus, was entered into the 2001 Cannes Film Festival. The third part The Sun depicting Japanese Emperor Shōwa (Hirohito) during the final days of World War II, was entered in the 55th Berlin International Film Festival.

Internationally co-produced film East/West (1999) starring Sandrine Bonnaire and Catherine Deneuve told the story of an emigre family living in Stalinist USSR. The film was nominated as Academy Award for Best Foreign Language Film and Golden Globe Award for Best Foreign Language Film, National Board of Review, and received four nominations at the César Awards.

The satiric melodrama of Dmitry Meskhiev, Women's Property (1999) describes a love affair between a young student and an older actress who is incurably ill. Her death leads the protagonist to face bitter loneliness. The film starred Yelena Safonova and featured actor Konstantin Khabensky in an early lead role.

Cult crime comedy 8 ½ $ (1999), directorial debut of Grigori Konstantinopolsky, starring Ivan Okhlobystin and Fyodor Bondarchuk was a satiric take on 1990s Russia. It told the story of a television advertisement director who becomes romantically involved with a gangster's girlfriend.

Svetlana Baskova directed the low-budget independently made exploitation shock-horror film The Green Elephant in 1999. Baskova noted that the film was conceived as a protest against the Chechen war. In 2022 the film has been banned in Russia.

=== 2000s ===
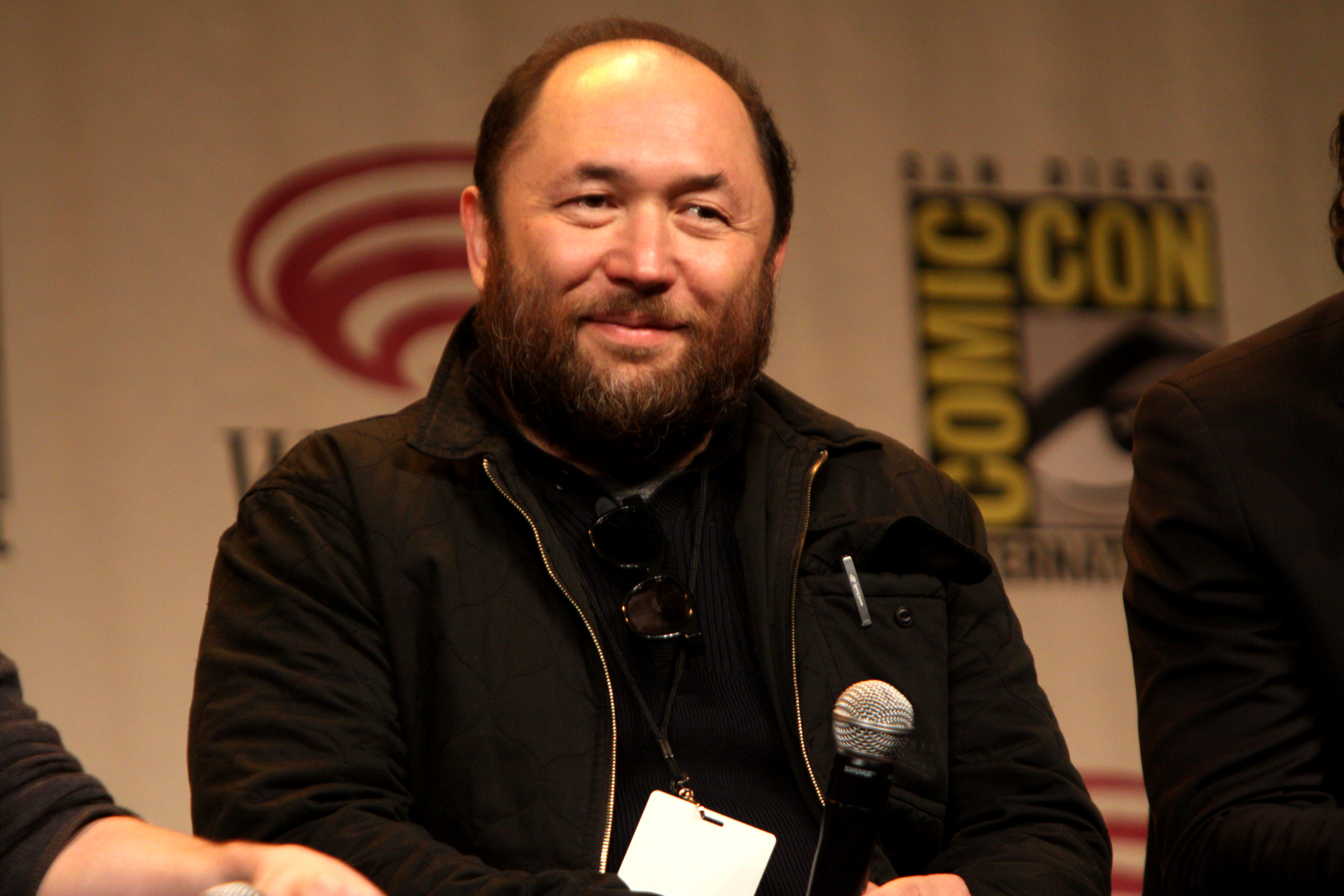
Timur Bekmambetov, a director of Kazakh origin, directed three of highest grossing Russian movies of the 2000s, including the famous Night Watch and Day Watch.

The film His Wife's Diary (2000) by Aleksei Uchitel won awards at both Kinotavr and Nika Award. The biographical film was about the last love affair of writer Ivan Bunin. Uchitel's 2005 film Dreaming of Space won the Golden George at the 27th Moscow International Film Festival.

Roman Kachanov directed the absurdist comedies Demobbed (2000) and Down House (2001), which were both co-written with actor Ivan Okhlobystin who also starred in the films. Both are considered to be cult films in Russia. FIPRESCI awarded a special mention to the film Demobbed at the 2000 Kinotavr.

The Romanovs: An Imperial Family is a 2000 Russian historical drama film about the last days of Tsar Nicholas II and his family. The film premiered at the 22nd annual Moscow Film Festival.

Karen Shakhnazarov's 2001 film Poisons or the World History of Poisoning was awarded the Grand Prix at the Kinotavr film festival in Sochi. At the Karlovy Vary International Film Festival the picture was nominated for the Crystal Globe and was screened at the 51st Berlin International Film Festival. Another Shakhnazarov films, The Rider Named Death, Vanished Empire and Ward Number 6, released in 2004, 2008 and 2009 respectively.

The Cuckoo by Aleksandr Rogozhkin won multiple awards at the 24th Moscow International Film Festival. The WWII set film starred Finnish actor Ville Haapasalo as a stranded Finnish sniper.

House of Fools is a 2002 Russian film by Andrei Konchalovsky about psychiatric patients and combatants during the First Chechen War. The film was screened in the competition at the 59th Venice International Film Festival and won Grand Special Jury Prize and UNICEF Award.

Egor Konchalovsky directed Antikiller (2002) starring Gosha Kutsenko as a police officer turned vigilante proved to be a success among Russian audiences.

In 2002 Pavel Lungin directed the film Tycoon about a Russian oligarch. Vladimir Mashkov played the Boris Berezovsky inspired lead character.

Chekhov's Motifs is a 2002 Russian-Ukrainian comedy film directed by Kira Muratova. It was entered into the 24th Moscow International Film Festival.

2002 comedy-drama film In Motion was the directorial debut of Filipp Yankovsky.

Feature film debut by Aleksei German Jr. The Last Train (2003) won the Best Picture and International Film Critics' Awards at Thessaloniki and honorable mention for Little Golden Lion award at the 60th Venice International Film Festival . His second film, Garpastum, was screened in the competition at the 62nd Venice International Film Festival. For his film Paper Soldier, Aleksei German Jr. received the Silver Lion and Golden Osella for Best Cinematography from the 65th Venice International Film Festival.

Andrey Zvyagintsev's The Return (2003), a Golden Lion award from the 60th Venice International Film Festival recipient and Golden Globe Best Foreign Language Film and César Award for Best Foreign Film nominie, shows two brothers' test of life when their father suddenly returns that reaches a deep almost-mystic pitch. Russian Ark (2003) by Alexander Sokurov, was filmed in a single 96-minute shot in the Russian Hermitage Museum is a dream-like narration that tells about classic Russian culture sailing in the Ark. It was screened at the 2002 Cannes Film Festival.

The Tuner is a 2004 Ukraine/Russia mix film of art house grotesque and a sting comedy. At the heart of Kira Muratova’s film is her characteristic and enduring love of predation—predation for its own sake. The film offers a complex assessment of the human subject, civilization, and the creative act. It premiered out of competition at the 61st Venice International Film Festival

Night Watch (2004) by Timur Bekmambetov was one of the first blockbusters made after the collapse of the Soviet film industry. The supernatural thriller starred Konstantin Khabensky and was based on the eponymous book by Sergei Lukyanenko. It was followed by the sequel Day Watch (2006), that nominated on Saturn Award for Best International Film.

Russian actress Renata Litvinova debuted as director in 2004 with the film Goddess: How I fell in Love.

The Italian is a 2005 Russian drama film directed by Andrei Kravchuk inspired by a true story, focuses on a young boy's determined search for his Mother. The film won the Grand Prix of the Deutsches Kinderhilfswerk from the International Jury at the 55th Berlin International Film Festival, and a Special Mention from their Children's Jury.

First on the Moon by Aleksei Fedorchenko is a 2005 Russian mockumentary science fiction film about a fictional 1930s Soviet landing on the Moon and was directorial debut of Fedorchenko. It was screened at 62nd Venice International Film Festival in Horrizons section and won Best Film Award.

The 9th Company is a 2005 Russian war film directed by Fedor Bondarchuk and set during the Soviet–Afghan War. The film is loosely based on a real-life battle that took place at Elevation 3234 in early 1988, during Operation Magistral, the last large-scale Soviet military operation in Afghanistan.

The serialised novels by Boris Akunin set in pre-Revolutionary Russia evolve around fictional Erast Fandorin adventures in three popular movies: The Azazel (2002) by Aleksandr Adabashyan, The Turkish Gambit (2005) by Dzhanik Fayziev and The State Counsellor (2005) by Filipp Yankovsky.

The film 977 by Nikolay Khomeriki was screened in the Un Certain Regard section at the 2006 Cannes Film Festival. Three years later his film Tale in the Darkness competed in the same section at the 2009 Cannes Film Festival.

Euphoria is a 2006 Russian drama romance film directed by dramatist and director Ivan Vyrypaev. The film was nominated on Golden Lion at 63rd Venice International Film Festival and won Little Golden Lion.

Life of the Orthodox Monastery and their Christian miracles are described in the film The Island (2006) by Pavel Lungin. The film was screened out of the competition at the 63rd Venice International Film Festival and received the Golden Eagle and Nika awards.

Konstantin Lopushansky directed the science-fiction film The Ugly Swans in 2006, based on the 1967 novel by Arkady and Boris Strugatsky. The film received the Best Score award at Kinotavr.

Psychological drama The Banishment by Andrey Zvyagintsev and war drama Alexandra by Alexander Sokurov was selected in competition section at the 2007 Cannes Film Festival where The Banishment won the Best Actor Award.

12 is a Russian-language remake of 12 Angry Men directed by Nikita Mikhalkov, was screened in the competition at the 64th Venice International Film Festival there won the Special Lion for Mikhalkov and received an Academy Award nomination for Best Foreign Language Film. Kazakh-Russian co-production epic film Mongol directed by Sergey Bodrov also received an Academy Award nomination for Best Foreign Language Film.

Cargo 200 is a Russian neo-noir thriller directed by Aleksei Balabanov won Best Director Award on Gijón International Film Festival.

One of Russia's all-time biggest box-office hits was Timur Bekmambetov's romantic-comedy The Irony of Fate 2, directed in 2007 as a sequel to the 1976 film. 2008 musical film Hipsters, directed by Valery Todorovsky about the youth lifestyle in the 1950s Soviet Union was a success at the box office. It received the Golden Eagle and Nika awards for best picture.

Valeriya Gai Germanika received the "Special Mention" of the jury of the Camera d'Or competition at the 2008 Cannes Film Festival for her feature debut Everybody Dies but Me.

At the 2008 Sundance Film Festival Anna Melikian won the award for best Dramatic Directing for her film Mermaid.

In 2008 was released Admiral, biopic about Alexander Kolchak, a vice admiral in the Imperial Russian Navy and leader of the anti-communist White movement during the Russian Civil War directed by Andrei Kravchuk. Later Kravchuk directed two another films based on the historic events: Viking and Union of Salvation, released in 2016 and 2019 respectively.

Sci-fi picture Dark Planet (2008–2009) based on the book by Arkady and Boris Strugatsky, directed by Fyodor Bondarchuk, was one of the most expensive Russian films of the 2000s, with its budget of $36.6 million.

Room and a Half is a 2009 Russian biographical film directed by Andrei Khrzhanovsky about life of Russian poet Joseph Brodsky. This film received the Best Film award in the East of the West section at the Karlovy Vary International Film Festival.

In 2009 Tambourine, Drum by Aleksey Mizgirev won Special Jury Prize, Best Direction Prize and the special prize from the youth jury at 2009 Locarno Film Festival.

=== 2010s ===
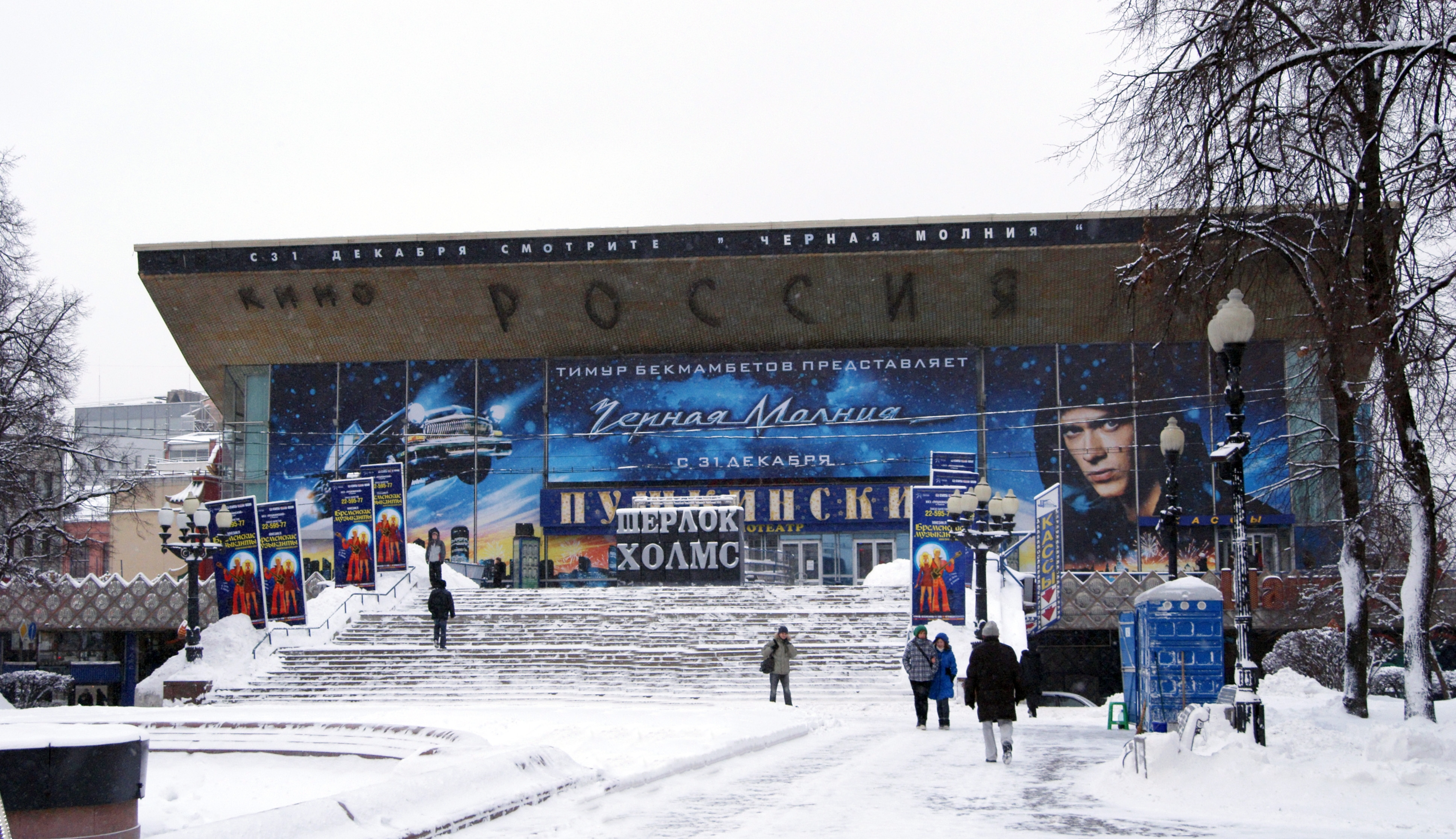
The Rossiya Theatre hosts the Moscow International Film Festival.

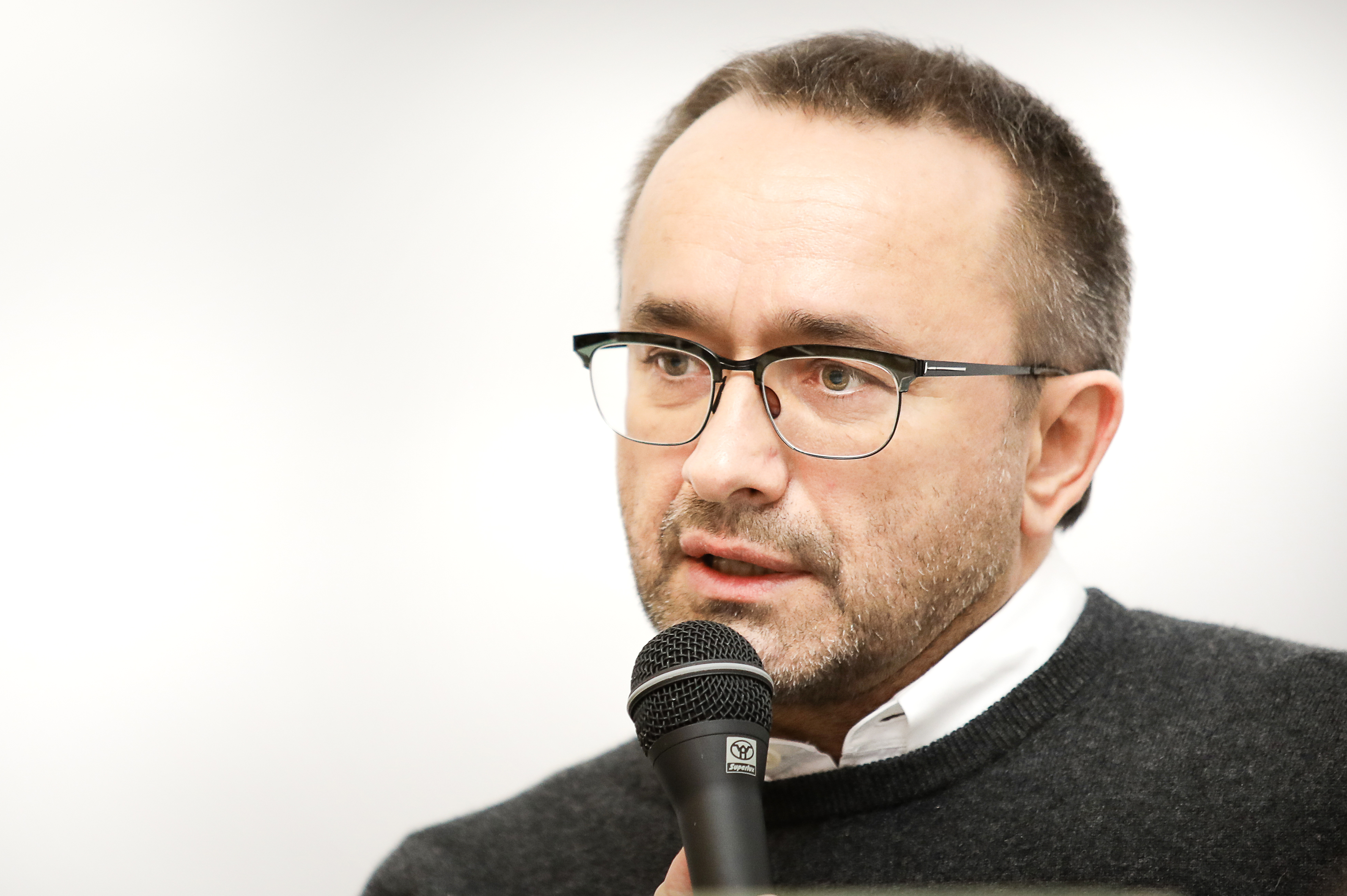
Andrei Zvyagintsev's art house dramas received many awards, including an Academy Award nominations in 2015 and 2018.

In 2014 censorship of cinematic works was officially introduced with a new and stricter revision of the "screening certificate" (Russian: прокатное удостоверение, romanized: prokatnoye udostovereniye) act, without which public film screenings are not allowed and are punishable by law. Curse words in films were banned. The concept of a "screening certificate" first appeared in Russian laws in 1993, when Viktor Chernomyrdin signed the decree "On the registration of films and videos", the main purpose of which was to combat the spread of pirated content. For a decade and a half, the document was more or less a formality.

In 2010 the comedy anthology film Yolki produced by Timur Bekmambetov was released. It spawned seven sequels, one prequel and one spin-off. How I Ended This Summer by Alexei Popogrebski, a film shot in remote Chukotka, won Silver Bear for Best Actor in 60th Berlin International Film Festival. The same year arthouse film Silent Souls by Aleksey Fedorchenko won the Golden Osella for Best Cinematography and a FIPRESCI Award at the 67th Venice Film Festival.

In 2010 Jolly Fellows directed by Felix Mikhailov was screened at the 60th Berlin International Film Festival, and also was the first Russian picture to be chosen as the opening film of the Panorama section at the festival.

Fortress of War is a 2010 Russian-Belarusian war film directed by Alexander Kott recounting the June 1941 defense of Brest Fortress against invading Wehrmacht forces in the opening stages of Operation Barbarossa, Nazi Germany's invasion of the Soviet Union during World War II. The film received universal acclaim from Russian critics and auditory.

The Edge by Alexei Uchitel was nominated for the 2010 Golden Globe Award for Best Foreign Language Film.

Yury Bykov debuted as a director with the film To Live in 2010. His film The Major screened at the 2013 Cannes Film Festival. His film The Fool won the Best Actor Award at the 2014 Locarno Film Festival. His film The Factory screened at the 2018 Toronto International Film Festival.

Drama films Elena by Andrey Zvyagintsev and The Hunter by Baku Bakuradze was selected in the Un Certain Regard section at the 2011 Cannes Film Festival, where Elena won the Special Jury Prize.

Faust, the last part of tetralogy by Aleksandr Sokurov, won the Golden Lion at the 68th Venice International Film Festival . His follow-up film Francofonia received the Mimmo Rotella Award at the 72nd Venice International Film Festival .

2011 romantic comedy Lucky Trouble directed by Levan Gabriadze and produced by Timur Bekmambetov, starred Hollywood actress Milla Jovovich who played the female lead opposite Konstantin Khabensky.

Generation P (2011) by Victor Ginzburg was an independently produced satiric comedy about advertisement business set in the 1990s. The film was based on Victor Pelevin's 1999 novel of the same name. The film won Special Jury Mention at the 2011 Karlovy Vary International Film Festival.

Betrayal by Kirill Serebrennikov was selected in competition on 69th Venice International Film Festival.

White Tiger is a 2012 Russian war film, directed by Karen Shakhnazarov and co-written with Aleksandr Borodyansky based on the novel Tankist, ili "Belyy tigr" (The Tankman, or The White Tiger) by Russian novelist Ilya Boyashov. The film is about a badly wounded Soviet tank commander on the Eastern Front of World War II who becomes obsessed with tracking down and destroying a mysterious, invincible Nazi tank, which the Soviet troops call the "White Tiger". The Soviets design a new, more powerful T-34 tank and assign the tank commander the job of destroying the White Tiger.

Aleksey Adrianov directed the high-budget Boris Akunin adaptation Spy in 2012.

A Russian filmmaker who continued to make a name for himself in Hollywood was Timur Bekmambetov, a producer and director of blockbuster films. In the United States he directed Wanted (2008), Abraham Lincoln: Vampire Hunter (2012) and Ben-Hur (2016).

Starting from 2003 Russia's animation industry began to manufacture films which are profitable domestically and abroad. Some of the pictures included Voronezh Animation Studio projects: The Snow Queen 1, 2, 3, 4, Sheep and Wolves 1, 2, Secret Magic Control Agency; Melnitsa Animation Studio projects: Little Longnose, The Three Bogatyrs series (including Dobrynya Nikitich and Zmey Gorynych and Horse Julius and Big Horse Racing), Luntik, The Tale of Soldier Fedot, The Daring Fellow, Ivan Tsarevich and the Gray Wolf 1, 2, 3, Fantastic Journey to OZ; projects of other studios: Prince Vladimir, Kikoriki, Space Dogs and Space Dogs: Return to Earth, Masha and the Bear, A Warrior's Tail, Hoffmaniada.

War epic Stalingrad directed by Fyodor Bondarchuk in 2013 set new box-office records in Russia and abroad. After Stalingrad's success at the box-office, increasingly more films started to be made in Russia about WWII. Other WWII films that were made in Russia included The Dawns Here Are Quiet (2015), Battle for Sevastopol (2015) Panfilov's 28 Men (2016), Sobibor (2018), Tankers (2018), T-34 (2019), Saving Leningrad (2019), The Last Frontier (2020), AK-47 (2020), A Siege Diary (2020), V2. Escape from Hell (2021), The Pilot. A Battle for Survival (2021), The Red Ghost (2021) and First Oscar (2022).

2013 comedy Kiss Them All! by Zhora Kryzhovnikov, produced by Timur Bekmambetov, is the most profitable domestic film in the history of Russian box office, having managed to earn more than 27.3 million dollars on a comparatively modest budget of $1.5 million. The film was followed by Kiss Them All! 2, which became the most profitable film of 2014 in Russia.

Hard to Be a God is a 2013 Russian epic medieval science fiction film directed by Aleksei German who co-wrote the screenplay with Svetlana Karmalita. It was his last film and it is based on the 1964 novel of the same name by Arkady and Boris Strugatsky. Hard to Be a God was listed by numerous critics' and publications' as one of the top films of 2015 and also been considered one of the top films of the 2010s.

Chagall — Malevich is a 2014 Russian biographical drama film directed by Alexander Mitta about the Vitebsk period in the life of the artist Marc Chagall and his relationship with fellow artist Kazimir Malevich. It also showed at the 2014 Busan International Film Festival.

Film by Alexander Veledinsky, The Geographer Drank His Globe Away, based on the novel of the same name by Alexei Ivanov, was awarded the main prize at Kinotavr 2013.

In 2014, Andrey Zvyagintsev's Leviathan was entered in the 2014 Cannes Film Festival, where it won Best Screenplay Award and was nominated on four European Film Awards, including Best Film, BAFTA Award for Best Film Not in the English Language and Academy Award for Best Foreign Language Film at the 87th Academy Awards. It won the Golden Globe for Best Foreign Language Film. After the film got leaked online and was downloaded by 1.5 million users, domestic distributors decided to make a wide release of the controversial film which was negatively viewed by the Russian authorities due to its gloomy and critical view of Russia.

Sunstroke is a 2014 Russian drama film directed, produced and written by Nikita Mikhalkov, starring Martinsh Kalita and Viktoriya Solovyova. It is set after the collapse of the Russian Empire during the Red Terror in 1920, with flashbacks to 1907, and is loosely based on the story "Sunstroke" and the book Cursed Days by Nobel Prize-winning Russian writer Ivan Bunin.

Two Women is a 2014 Russian drama film directed by Vera Glagoleva, starring Ralph Fiennes and Sylvie Testud. It is based on Ivan Turgenev's 1872 play A Month in the Country (originally written as Two Women in 1855). The film won the Best Feature Film award at the 3rd Hanoi International Film Festival.

Under the Sun is a 2015 Russian documentary film directed by Vitaly Mansky won Best Director Award at the Tallinn Black Nights Film Festival. The film follows a year in the life of a family in Pyongyang, North Korea as their daughter Zin-mi prepares to join the Korean Children's Union on the Day of the Shining Star (Kim Jong-il's birthday). North Korea permitted only Mansky, cinematographer Alexandra Ivanova, and a sound assistant to visit the country. North Korean authorities objected to the film's screening after discovering that the film crew had smuggled unapproved footage.

Under Electric Clouds by Aleksei German won the Silver Bear for Outstanding Artistic Contribution for Cinematography at the 65th Berlin International Film Festival. His follow-up film Dovlatov (2018) about writer Sergei Dovlatov, was awarded a Silver Bear for Outstanding Artistic Contribution for costume and production design 68th Berlin International Film Festival .

Battalion is a 2015 Russian war film directed by Dmitry Meskhiev that relates the story of the First Battalion of Death, a women-only Russian combat unit that fought in the First World War. Actress Mariya Aronova plays the role of real-life heroine Maria Bochkareva. Battalion was the biggest winner at the 2015 Golden Eagle Awards, winning four awards out of nine nominations.

In 2015 Ilya Naishuller debuted with the film Hardcore Henry which was screened at the Toronto Film Festival. He later directed Nobody (2021) in Hollywood.

Andrei Konchalovsky received the Silver Lion at the 73rd Venice International Film Festival for his black and white Holocaust drama Paradise in 2016. He previously received the Silver Lion for The Postman's White Nights at the 71st Venice International Film Festival.

2016 one-man thriller film Collector by Aleksei Krasovsky starring Konstantin Khabensky won an award at the Karlovy Vary International Film Festival.

In 2016 The Duelist directed by Aleksey Mizgirev was screened at the 2016 Toronto International Film Festival.

Disaster film Flight Crew, directed by Nikolai Lebedev with actor Danila Kozlovsky was a success at the box-office in 2016.

The Student by Kirill Serebrennikov won the François Chalais Prize at the 2016 Cannes Film Festival . Leto, Russian musical film also directed by Kirill Serebrennikov that depicts the Leningrad underground rock scene of the early 1980s, was selected to compete for the Palme d'Or at the 2018 Cannes Film Festival, where it won the Cannes Soundtrack Award.

2016 film Zoology by Ivan I. Tverdovsky won the Special Jury Award at the Karlovy Vary International Film Festival.

In 2017, Andrey Zvyagintsev's Loveless was entered in the 2017 Cannes Film Festival, where it won Jury Prize and nominated on BAFTA Award for Best Film Not in the English Language, Golden Globe for Best Foreign Language Film and Academy Award for Best Foreign Language Film at the 90th Academy Awards, and five nominations, including Best Film, and won two European Film Awards, including Best Cinematographer for Krichman, as well as the César Award for Best Foreign Film.

2017 science fiction action film Attraction directed and produced by Fyodor Bondarchuk became a box office hit, grossing more than 1 billion rubles and becoming the highest-grossing Russian sci-fi movie. A sequel, Invasion, premiered on New Year's Day 2020, grossed less than predecessor.

The 2017 sports drama Going Vertical by Anton Megerdichev is the highest grossing domestic film of the 2010s. It also became the highest-grossing Russian film in China, where it grossed CN¥85 million ($12.3 million) which brought the film's worldwide gross to $66.3 million.

In 2017 was released two films about space: The Age of Pioneers directed by Dmitry Kiselyov and Salyut 7 directed by Klim Shipenko.

Walt Disney produced Slavic fantasy film Last Knight directed by Dmitry Dyachenko was a success at the box-office in 2017, earning $30 million. The film was followed by two sequels in 2021; The Last Warrior: Root of Evil and The Last Warrior: A Messenger of Darkness.

Arrhythmia by director Boris Khlebnikov received the Best Actor Award at the 2017 Karlovy Vary International Film Festival.

Matilda by Aleksei Uchitel about the relationship between ballerina Matilda Kshesinskaya and Nicholas II caused controversy amongst monarchist and Orthodox authorities and public in 2017.

Maryus Vaysberg is a film director mainly working in the comedy genre. He is one of the most commercially successful directors of Russia. His 2017 film Naughty Grandma was a box office success and the most successful Russian film in 2017. Many of his films starred future president of Ukraine Volodymyr Zelenskyy.

Anna's War by Aleksey Fedorchenko premiered at the Rotterdam Film Festival in 2018. The film won the Golden Eagle Award in the Best Film category. Fedorchenko won the award for Best Director.

Jumpman is a 2018 drama film directed and written by Ivan I. Tverdovskiy won the Special Jury Mention at the Karlovy Vary International Film Festival.

In 2018 The Man Who Surprised Everyone directed by Aleksey Chupov and Natasha Merkulova won Best Actress Award the Horizons (Orizzonti) section of the 75th Venice International Film Festival.

Ice is a 2018 Russian musical romantic drama sports film directed by Oleg Trofim and produced by Fyodor Bondarchuk, is the most profitable domestic film in 2018 and one of the most profitable domestic film in the history of Russian box office, having managed to earn more than 26.4 million dollars on a comparatively modest budget of $2 million. A sequel, Ice 2, directed by Zhora Kryzhovnikov, like its predecessor, became a blockbuster, grossed 193.7 million rubles on opening day, making it the highest-grossing Russian film on opening Day and grossed over 1.4 billion rubles in total and was nominated on Golden Rooster Award for Best Foreign Language Film.

In 2019 Acid, directed by Alexander Gorchilin was screened in Panorama section at the 69th Berlin International Film Festival.

Drama film Beanpole by Kantemir Balagov and drama film Once in Trubchevsk by Larissa Sadilova selected in the Un Certain Regard section at the 2019 Cannes Film Festival where Beanpole won the Best Director Award and FIPRESCI Prize. The previous Balagov's film Closeness also selected to compete in the Un Certain Regard section at the 2017 Cannes Film Festival and won the FIPRESCI Prize.

Sin is a Russian-Italian biographical drama film about the life of the famous sculptor and painter of the Renaissance, Michelangelo Buonarroti of Florence, in the early 16th century, written and directed by Andrei Konchalovsky, released in October 2019.

Why Don't You Just Die! is a 2018 Russian dark comedy thriller film directed by Kirill Sokolov and starring Aleksandr Kuznetsov, Vitaly Khaev, Evgeniya Kregzhde and Yelena Shevchenko.

2019 comedy film Serf directed by Klim Shipenko and starring Miloš Biković set new domestic box-office records. It grossed $42.4 million against a budget of $2.6 million. The same year Shipenko directed the psychological thriller Text starring Alexander Petrov, which was also a success at the box-office and received a Nika and multiple Golden Eagle awards.

In the following years many Russian films have gotten wide releases in China, and there has been an increased number of planned Russo-Chinese co-productions. A few of the films produced by Russia and China are Viy, Viy 2: Journey to China starring Jackie Chan and Arnold Schwarzenegger, The Snow Queen 3: Fire and Ice and Quackerz.

=== 2020s ===
Dau, the first film of the controversial DAU project by director Ilya Khrzhanovsky, which was initially conceived as a biopic of Soviet scientist Lev Landau, premiered in 2019 in Paris. DAU. Natasha and DAU. Degeneration premiered at the 70th Berlin International Film Festival there first won the Silver Bear for an Outstanding Artistic Contribution for Cinematography. The rest of the films were released on VOD through the official DAU website in 2020.

War drama Persian Lessons by Vadim Perelman premiered at the 70th Berlin International Film Festival .

In 2020 Conference directed by Ivan Tverdovskiy and The Whaler Boy directed by Philipp Yuryev was screened at the Giornate degli Autori section at the 77th Venice International Film Festival, where last won Best Film Award of this section.

At the 77th Venice International Film Festival, Dear Comrades! directed by Andrei Konchalovsky telling the story of the Novocherkassk massacre, won the Special Jury Prize. The film also received a nomination for BAFTA Award for Best Film Not in the English Language.

Sputnik is a 2020 Russian science-fiction horror film directed by Egor Abramenko in his feature directorial debut. It stars Oksana Akinshina as a young doctor who is recruited by the Soviet military to assess a cosmonaut who survived a mysterious space accident and returned to Earth with a dangerous organism living inside him. Alongside Akinshina, the film's cast includes Pyotr Fyodorov and Fyodor Bondarchuk. The film was nominated on Saturn Award for Best International Film.

Historic romance film The Silver Skates, by Michael Lockshin in his directorial debut, was chosen as the opening film of the 42nd Moscow International Film Festival, where it premiered on October 1, 2020. The rights to the film were acquired by Netflix on June 16, 2021. The Silver Skates is the first Russian film to be released on the platform in the Netflix Originals category.

Yakut language drama Scarecrow by Dmitry Davydov won the main prize at the 2020 Kinotavr film festival . Yakut films, also nicknamed "Sakhawood", have been steadily gaining popularity in Russia.

Comedy drama House Arrest by Aleksey German Jr. and Ossetian language drama Unclenching the Fists by Kira Kovalenko was selected to compete in the Un Certain Regard section at the 2021 Cannes Film Festival there Unclenching the Fists won Un Certain Regard Award.

The Last Darling Bulgaria by Aleksey Fedorchenko premiered at the 2021 Moscow International Film Festival.

Historical war drama film Ivan Denisovich by veteran director Gleb Panfilov premiered at the 2021 Locarno Film Festival . The film based on the novel by Aleksandr Solzhenitsyn starred Filipp Yankovsky in the main role.

In 2021 WWII action film The Red Ghost by Andrei Bogatyrev was released in Russian cinemas.

2021 film Gerda about a young striptease dancer by director Natalya Kudryashova premiered at the 74th Locarno Film Festival where it received the Best Actress Award and the special prize from the youth jury of the festival.

Natalya Merkulova and Aleksey Chupov's film Captain Volkonogov Escaped (2021), set during the Great Purge, was screened at the 78th Venice International Film Festival. Mama, I'm Home directed by Vladimir Bitokov was included into the Orizzonti Extra program at the same Festival.

Surrealistic satire Petrov's Flu by Kirill Serebrennikov were screened at the 2021 Cannes Film Festival, there won Vulcan Award for cinematography. Finnish-Russian co-production Compartment No. 6 by Juho Kuosmanen was also part of the program and it won the Grand Prix of the festival.

Apocalyptic drama Quarantine directed by Diana Ringo and starring Anatoliy Beliy, co-produced by Finland and Russia, was an official non-English language Golden Globes 2022 entry.

The Execution is a 2021 Russian mystery thriller film and directorial debut by Lado Kvataniya. It premiered at the 2021 Fantastic Fest and theatrically released in Russia on April 21, 2022.

Tchaikovsky's Wife by Kirill Serebrennikov was included in the competition program of 2022 Cannes Film Festival.

Convenience Store by Mikhail Borodin, about Uzbeki immigrants working illegally in Moscow, premiered at the 72nd Berlin International Film Festival.

Fairytale is a 2022 experimental adult animated fantasy film directed by Alexander Sokurov premiered at the 75th Locarno Film Festival.

The Cage is Looking for a Bird directed by Malika Musaeva was screened on Encountes section at the 73rd Berlin International Film Festival.

Live-action/animated children's film Cheburashka set the record as the highest-grossing Russian film of all time in 2023. The film grossed $94.5 million at the box-office.

In 2023 the first movie shot in space was released, The Challenge directed by Klim Shipenko, starring Yulia Peresild. The film was a box-office success, grossing $21.5 million at the Russian box-office.

In November 2023 the sci-fi film 1984 by Diana Ringo was released. It is the first Russian-language adaptation of George Orwell's novel of the same name. It is dedicated to the writer's 120th birth anniversary.

American film Anora starring Russian actors won the Palme d'Or at the 77th Cannes Film Festival in 2024.

Internationally produced Russian-language drama Two Prosecutors directed by Sergei Loznitsa, starring Aleksandr Kuznetsov and Anatoliy Beliy, premiered at the 78th Cannes Film Festival in 2025 in competition.

Internationally produced Russian-language drama Minotaur, directed by Andrey Zvyagintsev premiered at the 79th Cannes Film Festival in 2026 in competition and won Grand Prix.

==== 2022 boycott ====
The 2022 Russian invasion of Ukraine has impacted Russian cinema. The Russian Association of Theater Owners said that there is a "high probability of the liquidation of the entire film screening industry"; ticket sales in March 2022 were half of what they had been in March 2021. The Annecy International Animation Film Festival, Berlinale, Cannes, Venice, and the Toronto Film Festival banned official Russian delegations. The Stockholm Film Festival banned all Russian projects funded by the government. The European Film Awards and Emmys banned Russian films outright. FIAPF (Fédération Internationale des Associations de Producteurs de Films, translated as the International Federation of Film Producers Associations) paused the accreditation of the Moscow International Film Festival and Message to Man until further notice. MIPTV in France won't allow "any Russian film and TV outfits" in 2022, and Russia has also been banned from the Banff World Media Festival and NATPE. Several major international film distributors, including The Walt Disney Company, Sony Pictures, Paramount, and Warner Bros stopped screening films in Russia; prior to the invasion, movies produced in the United States made up 70% of the Russian film market. FIPRESCI announced that it will not participate in festivals and other events organized by the Russian government and its offices, and canceled a colloquium in St. Petersburg, that was to make it familiar with new Russian films.

Ukrainian film director Sergei Loznitsa spoke out against banning Russian films. He said: "Among Russian filmmakers, there are people who have condemned the war, who oppose the regime and openly expressed their condemnation. And in a way they're victims of this whole conflict like the rest of us." And: "We must not judge people based on their passports. We can judge them on their acts." Dissident Russian film director Kirill Serebrennikov also spoke out against the boycott.

== Russian film production ==
There are around 400 private production companies. They do not have their own facilities for creating films, and therefore must rent out spaces and equipment from their qualified partners. There are 35 film studios (9 of them are governmental) that are the major service for renting space. The studios have 107 shooting pavilions. There are 23 private companies on the Russian market that rent their equipment of all kinds to the production teams.

=== Leading production companies on the market ===
The list is composed by the Cinema Foundation of Russia. It allows companies to get governmental financial support. In 2017 the number of market leaders was increased up to 10 companies.

- Bazelevs Company run by Timur Bekmambetov
- Art Pictures Studio run by Fyodor Bondarchuk and Dmitri Rudovsky
- СТВ run by Sergey Selyanov
- Trite run by Nikita Mikhalkov
- Enjoy Movies run by Andreasyan brothers and Georgy Malkov
- Non-Stop Production run by Alexander Rodnyansky, Sergey Melkumov
- Central Partnership part of Gazprom holding
- Film Direction run by Anatoly Maksimov
- Profit run by Igor Tolstunov
- VBD Group

=== List of highest-grossing films ===
According to Kinopoisk.ru, highest-grossing Russian films, as of August 2023, are the following: List of highest-grossing Russian films

Below are the highest-grossing movies in Russia.

Rank	Title	Gross in rubles (₽)	Year	Country
1	Cheburashka	7,045,624,390 ₽	2022	Russia
2	Avatar	3,614,808,486 ₽	2009	United States
3	Spider-Man: No Way Home	3,513,632,607 ₽	2021	United States
4	Serf	3,183,678,613 ₽	2019	Russia
5	Going Vertical	3,046,794,737 ₽	2017	Russia
6	The Lion King (2019)	2,998,484,841 ₽	2019	United States
7	Avengers: Endgame	2,986,847,762 ₽	2019	United States
8	Venom: Let There Be Carnage	2,340,555,537 ₽	2021	United States
9	Pirates of the Caribbean: Dead Men Tell No Tales	2,325,732,329 ₽	2017	United States
10	T-34	2,317,312,005 ₽	2019	Russia
11	Zootopia	2,280,692,859 ₽	2016	United States
12	The Last Warrior: A Messenger of Darkness	2,265,659,892 ₽	2021	Russia
13	Maleficent: Mistress of Evil	2,181,245,142 ₽	2019	United States
14	Avengers: Infinity War	2,162,717,213 ₽	2018	United States
15	Venom	2,160,921,836 ₽	2018	United States
16	The Secret Life of Pets	2,138,455,552 ₽	2016	United States
17	The Challenge	2,057,977,880 ₽	2023	Russia
18	Joker	1,953,270,992 ₽	2019	United States
19	Frozen 2	1,891,549,027 ₽	2019	United States
20	Minions	1,866,431,191 ₽	2015	United States

Note: This list does not include earlier Soviet films, which are listed separately on the list of highest-grossing films in the Soviet Union.

=== Film distribution ===
There are 600 companies that release films all around Russia that includes 105 chain cinema theatres and 495 independent theatres. Chain companies consist of 29 federal, 19 regional and 57 local theatres. According to Neva Research, as of 1 July 2016 there were 1,227 cinemas with 4,067 screens in Russia. Ten major cinema companies hold 346 theatres with 1,772 screens, which corresponds to 43.6% of the whole amount.

In 2015 all the cinemas were finally digitalized. In the beginning of 2016 Russia has 33 theatres with 4D technology, 80 theatres with premium sound system, 43 theatres with 3D IMAX effect.

However, due to the Russian invasion of Ukraine in 2022, western countries such as the United States have imposed sanctions on Russia. Because of this, no more western films have been officially released in Russia since then.

== Awards ==
- Nika Award
- Golden Eagle Award
- Russian Guild of Film Critics
- TEFI

== Festivals ==
There are many film festivals in Russia. Since 2018, fashion film festivals have been established and held in Russia. Since 2019 every year, the Ministry of Culture of the Russian Federation compiles a state List of international film festivals held in the territory of the Russia.

Some Russian festivals:

- Artdocfest (Moscow and other cities)
- Ekaterinburg Jewish Film Festival (Ekaterinburg)
- Faces of Love Film Festival (Sochi)
- Festival of Festivals, St. Petersburg
- Kazan International Festival of Muslim Cinema (Kazan)
- Kinoshock (in Anapa)
- Kinotavr (Sochi)
- KROK International Animated Films Festival (in cities along the Volga or Dnieper rivers)
- Message to Man International Film Festival (St Petersburg)
- Moscow International Film Festival
- Moscow Jewish Film Festival
- Open Russian Festival of Animated Film (Suzdal)
- Pacific Meridian (in Vladivostok)
- Saint Petersburg International Film Festival
- Side by Side Lesbian and Gay International Film Festival (St Petersburg)
- Sozvezdie (various locations)
- Stalker International Film Festival on Human Rights (Moscow and regional cities)

== VOD platforms ==
Notable Video on Demand platforms include Okko, Wink, more.tv, Amediateka, SMOTRIM, MegaFon TV, Start, Kinopoisk HD, Premier, Ivi.ru, KION.

However online content platforms also face censorship in Russia.

== Cinematography schools ==
- Gerasimov Institute of Cinematography (claimed to be the oldest film school in the world)
- New York Film Academy, Moscow campus
- Moscow International Film School
- Russian State Institute of Performing Arts, formerly Leningrad State Institute of Theatre, Music, and Cinema (LGITMiK)

== See also ==
- Nika Award – the main national film award in Russia
- Cinema of the world
- History of Russian animation
- List of Russian films
- Union of Cinematographers of the Russian Federation

Major film industries in the world

- Hollywood
- Cinema of Belarus (popularity known as Mollywood)
- Cinema of South Korea
