= Getting to Know the Big, Wide World =

- Russian: Познавая белый свет
- Directed by: Kira Muratova
- Written by: Grigory Baklanov; Kira Muratova
- Starring: Nina Ruslanova; Sergei Popov; Aleksey Zharkov; Lyudmila Gurchenko; Natalya Leble
- Cinematography: Yuri Klimenko
- Music by: Valentin Silvestrov
- Release date: 1978
- Running time: 75 minute
- Country: Soviet Union
- Language: Russian

Getting to Know the Big, Wide World (Russian: Познавая белый свет) is a 1978 Soviet drama film directed by Kira Muratova.

The film is about a love triangle which unfolds on a gritty construction site as a truck driver and a laborer vie for the affections of a determined young woman, leading to rivalry, jealousy, and a final act of defiance.

== Plot ==
Truck driver Mikhail, recently arrived at a factory construction site, helps pull a car out of the mud and meets Lyuba and her friend Nikolai. He gives them a ride to a "Komsomol wedding" ceremony involving several couples, where Lyuba delivers a congratulatory speech. Over time, Mikhail grows closer to Lyuba, stirring jealousy in Nikolai, who believes Lyuba should belong to him.

Life at the construction site continues as usual. Lyuba’s friends, who work alongside her as plasterers, advise her to marry either Mikhail or Nikolai. Sometimes, Mikhail picks up Lyuba after work in the evening; she lives in a shared trailer with her friends. They talk in the truck, and when Mikhail drops her off, Nikolai often greets them with visible displeasure. One night, Mikhail helps a stranger fix her car engine on the roadside, while Lyuba finds and reads a love letter discarded by the stranger.

The factory is finally completed, and a celebration is held with joyful speeches. The builders prepare to move into a new apartment building allocated to them. Dressed in a suit and carrying flowers, Mikhail arrives to see Lyuba, who is waiting with her belongings near the new building, and proposes to her. He suggests they quickly register at the registry office, as there's a long line. Defeated, Nikolai walks away, breaking a mirror with a stone as he leaves, in which Mikhail and Lyuba were admiring themselves.

== Cast ==
- Nina Ruslanova as Lyuba
- Sergei Popov as Mikhail
- Aleksey Zharkov as Nikolay
- Lyudmila Gurchenko as Stranger
- Natalya Leble as Galya
- Vladimir Pozhidayev
- Lena Scelgunova as Zoya
- Natasha Scelgunova as Vera
