= Nataliya Buzko =

Soviet and Ukrainian actress

- Наталія Бузько
- Born: Nataliya Yevhenivna Buzko; 27 November 1963 (age 62); Sevastopol, Crimea, Ukrainian SSR, Soviet Union
- Occupation: Actress
- Years active: 1981-present

Nataliya Yevhenivna Buzko (Ukrainian: Наталія Євгенівна Бузько; born on 27 November 1963), is a Ukrainian actress. She is best known for appearing in 1997 film Three Stories.

In 2009, she was honored as an Artist of Ukraine. She is a member of the comedy troupe “Masks”, and has worked in the “House of Clowns” in Odesa.

She has been the acting teacher at the Star Time production center and the RemarkaFilm film school in Odesa.

== Early life ==
Nataliya Buzko was born in Sevastopol on 27 November 1963.

Since the age of five months, she has been living in Odesa.

An engineer by education, she graduated from the Odessa Institute of Marine Engineers in 1985. While studying at the institute, she attended pantomime courses, where she met actors who later became known as the comedy troupe “Masks”. As part of the troupe, Buzko made her first appearance on television.

== Career ==
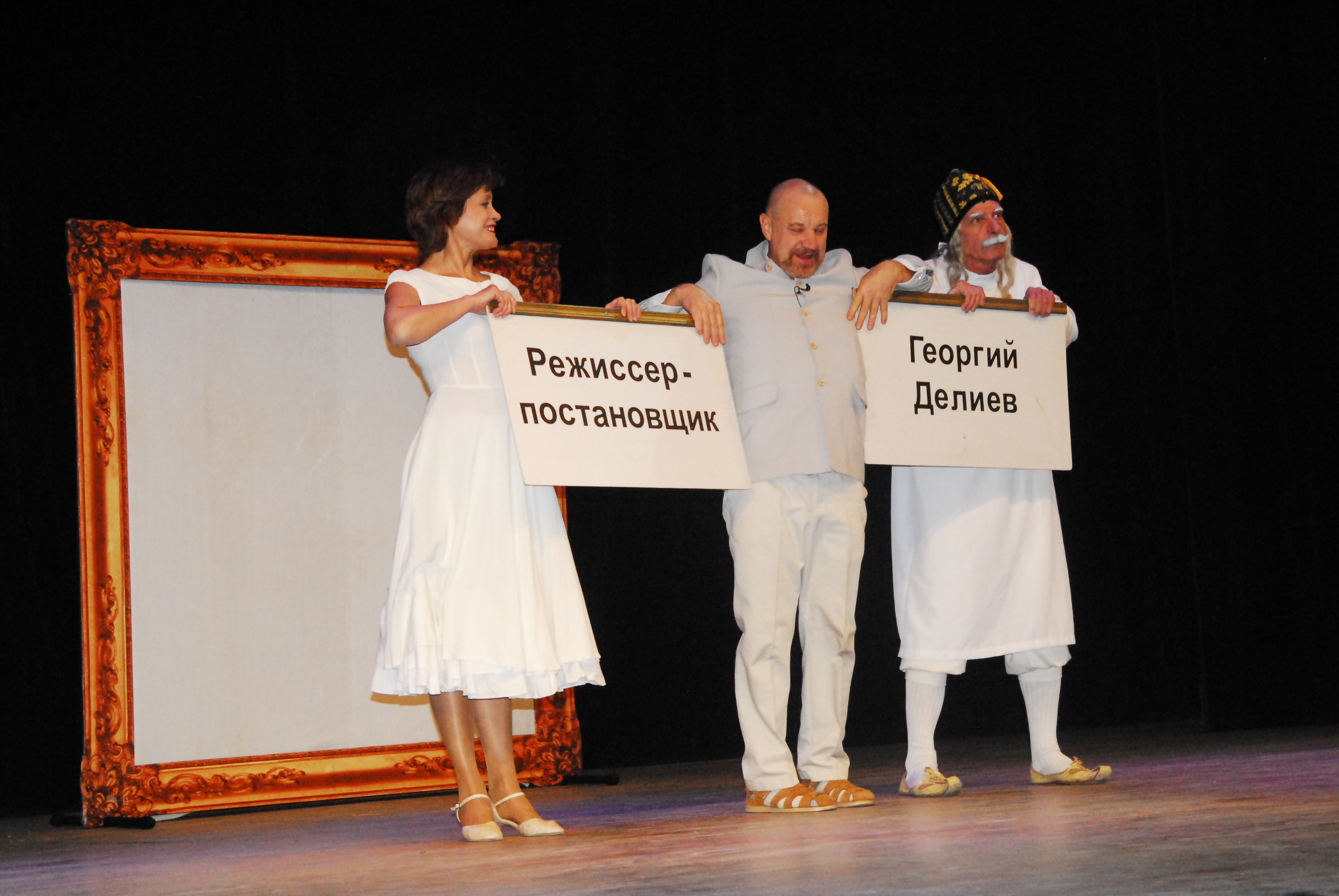
Buzko (left) in Melitopol in October 2017

Her successful debut in big cinema was the role of the brunette Masha in Kira Muratova's psychological drama “Asthenic Syndrome” in 1989. Subsequently, she starred in several more films by Kira Muratova.

In 2007, at the Brigantine film festival in Berdyansk, Buzko received a prize for best supporting role in Kira Muratova's film “Two in One.”

In her nomination, Buzko competed with Svetlana Nemolyaeva (“Blues of Falling Leaves”), Irina Melnik (“Another Life, or Escape from the Other World”) and Polina Kutepova (“Indi”).

The film “Two in One” was recognized as “Best Film of the CIS and Baltic Countries” according to the Nika Film Award, and in June it became the opening film of the 18th Kinotavr. The international premiere of the film took place in early May in New York at the Tribeca Film Festival, founded by Robert De Niro.

I'm very excited about the national premiere of Two in One. I liked how our film was received by sophisticated audiences at international film festivals - Kinotavr, Brigantine. And it’s very nice that overall the reviews were positive. But the most important thing for me is the opinion of the Ukrainian viewer, I would like him to like it, to be sad and laugh, because that was Kira Muratova’s idea.

— Natalya Buzko describing the film and the premiere as it follows

In the scene where actor Bogdan Stupka pulls Buzko's panties down, she said that she hoped the shot wouldn't explicitly show her vulva, as it does, she explained, "I was sure that the scene would be filmed in such a way that it would be clear: they were taking off their tights, pants, but nothing superfluous would be seen. And when it came time to shoot this scene and there was half the film behind, I knew that the frame would be as it is. 'Kira, how? 'Yes, just like that,' was her answer. But I will say that in the context of the film, this scene is justified, although I do not like nudity."

== Filmography ==
- 1981 — Take care of women — as girl at a disco in a yellow dress'
- 1988 — Disk-jocky as girl dancing
- 1989 — Asthenic Syndrome as Masha
- 1990 — Obscene language
- 1991 — Seven days with a Russian beauty as Masha, winner of the "Russian Beauty" competition
- 1993 — Just one thing
- 1994 — I love as Nina
- 1995 — Without collar — as Lina's mom
- 1997 — Three Stories as Tanya, the girl who abandoned her child in the maternity hospital
- 2001 — Secondary people as Vera
- 2002 — Chekhov's Motifs as bride
- 2002 — Friendly family as ENT doctor
- 2003 — Personal life of official people as Masha Rudenko
- 2003 — Twelve chairs as Ellochka Ogress
- 2003 — Hopscotch game
- 2004 — Tuner as Tanya
- 2006 — Ivan Podushkin. Gentleman of detective as Mamontova
- 2007 — By the river — Nastya's mother
- 2007 — Two in One as Masha
- 2008 — Shoot now! as maid of the architect Yaroshevich
- 2008 — Boiling water
- 2008 — Doll
- 2008 — The Smile of God, or a Pure Odessa Story as Kostanzhoglo's assistant
- 2009 — Marry Kasanova — cameo
- 2009 — Melody for a barrel organ — a kleptomaniac
- 2011 — Shabbat as a Main Role
- 2011 — Bergamot tea —as head physician of the hospital
- 2012 — Investigator Savelyev's cordon — Lyubov Heorhiyivna
- 2012 — Angels of War — Salome Tsymbalyu
- 2012 — Eternal Return — Herself
- 2014 — Beach as Natasha
- 2014 — Light and shadow of the lighthouse as Halyna's mother
- 2014 — Goodbye, boys as director of the orphanage
- 2015 — Anka from Moldavia as Raya the scammer
- 2015 — Someone else's loved ones - Lyuba as neighbor
- 2017 — Lev — Lev's mother
- 2017 — The foundling of Odessa — Miss Euphrosyne
- 2018 — Donbas — registry office ZAGAs
- 2019 — Potop — Mother

== Family ==
She divorced Oleksnandr Postolenko. She has two children: daughter Anna (born 7 August 1986) and son Anton (born 24 July 1999). On 25 April 2008, Natalya's granddaughter Yasna was born.
