= Passions (1994 film) =

- Directed by: Kira Muratova
- Written by: Kira Muratova; Evgeny Golubenko
- Produced by: Igor Kalyonov
- Starring: Renata Litvinova; Svetlana Kolenda; Mikhail Demidov
- Production company: Nikola-Film
- Release date: 1994
- Running time: 112 minutes
- Countries: Russia; Ukraine
- Language: Russian

Passions (Russian: «Увлеченья», romanized: Uvlechen'ya, lit. 'Enthusiasms') is a 1994 drama by Ukrainian director Kira Muratova based on the novellas of Boris Dedyukhin.

It was screened at the Locarno Festival in 1994.

It received two Nika Awards, for Best Picture and Best Director (Muratova). The picture also won the Special Jury Prize of the Kinotavr film festival.

== Plot ==
The film's story unfolds in a small town on the beach. Two females: a blonde - Lilia and a brunette - Violetta, are fond of horse racing and the jockeys are fond of the women. Star jockey Oleg Nikolaev teaches Violetta horse riding and another horseman who is also interested in the same girl, summons Oleg Nikolayev to a duel.

== Cast ==
- Renata Litvinova – Lilia
- Svetlana Kolenda – Violetta
- Mikhail Demidov – Kasyanov
- Aleksey Shevchenkov – Sasha Milashevski
- Sergei Popov – instructor
