= Rita's Last Fairy Tale =

- Film poster
- Russian: Последняя сказка Риты
- Directed by: Renata Litvinova
- Written by: Renata Litvinova
- Produced by: Renata Litvinova
- Starring: Olga Kuzina; Tatyana Drubich; Renata Litvinova; Nikolay Khomeriki; Regina Ayrapetyan
- Cinematography: Anastasia Zhukova
- Edited by: Oleg Karneev; Anton Mironenkov
- Music by: Zemfira
- Release dates: June 2012 (Moscow); October 18, 2012 (Russian)
- Country: Russia
- Language: Russian

Rita's Last Fairy Tale (Russian: Последняя сказка Риты) is a 2012 Russian fantasy drama film directed by Renata Litvinova.

== Plot ==
The film tells three different women, one of whom the feeling of love is unknown, but she does not lose hope of finding her, despite the fact that unsuccessful dates almost killed her. The second is getting ready for the wedding after a planned medical examination. The third one works as a doctor, but she is unhappy and hates her husband.

== Cast ==
- Olga Kuzina as Rita
- Tatyana Drubich as Nadya
- Renata Litvinova as Tanya Neubivko
- Nikolay Khomeriki as Kolya
- Regina Ayrapetyan as Regina
- Mitya Borisov as Petro
- Lev Danilkin
- Sergey Debizhev
- Albina Evtushevskaya
- Alisa Khazanova as Alevtina Mihaylovna
