= Festival of Festivals, Saint Petersburg =

Film festival held in St Petersburg, Russia

The Festival of Festivals in Saint Petersburg (Note: The St Petersburg Times article refers to it as "St Petersburg International Film Festival", but this appears to be incorrect, as there is another festival of this name that started in 2017.) is Russia’s largest non-competitive festival of recent outstanding works of international and Russian cinema. It is held annually in June, during Saint Petersburg's White Nights Festival.

== History ==
The festival was established in 1993. Past guests of the festival include Bob Rafelsson (film director), Meryl Streep (actress), François Ozon (film director), and others.

== Description ==
The Festival of Festivals—The main screening section. All films featured in this section are chosen from other international film festivals and are considered the best of the best films of each particular year.

New Russian Cinema—Every year's best Russian films.

Short Films—The best short films created by young directors from around the world.

Unifilm—The year's best children's films.

The festival also includes a Retrospectives screening section as well as a special screening section, whose themes change every year.

== Prizes ==
Although the festival is non-competitive, it does award a number of special prizes, including:

Grand Prix – Gold or Golden Gryphon (Griffon) - Awarded to the film rated highest by guests and participants

Silver Gryphon - Awarded to the film rated highest by audiences

Bronze Gryphon - Awarded to the best experimental film

The Nikolay Ovsyannikov Prize - Awarded for the best debut

Prize of the City of St. Petersburg - Awarded for contributions to world cinema made by a director whose film is featured in this year’s festival

Prize of the Board - Awarded to the screening section deemed to be this year’s best

Prize for Talent and National Recognition - Awarded to exceptional actors, actresses, and directors
