= Nina Ruslanova =

Russian actress (1945–2021)

- Born: 5 December 1945; Bohodukhiv, Kharkiv Oblast, Ukrainian SSR, Soviet Union
- Died: 21 November 2021 (aged 75); Moscow, Russia
- Occupation: Actress
- Years active: 1967–2021

Nina Ivanovna Ruslanova (Russian: Нина Ивановна Русланова; 5 December 1945 – 21 November 2021) was a Soviet and Russian theater and film actress.

She was honored as a People's Artist of Russia (1998).

== Early life ==
Ruslanova was orphaned at two months old in late winter 1945 in Bohodukhiv. Her surname (after Lidia Ruslanova) comes from the orphanages in the Kharkiv Oblast. She lived in five children's homes. She graduated from college with a degree as a construction plasterer. She then entered the Kharkiv Theatre Institute, where she studied for one term.

She moved to Moscow in 1969 and graduated Boris Shchukin Theatre Institute. Thereafter Ruslanova worked in Vakhtangov Theater, and from 1985 to 1988 in Mayakovsky Theatre. She debuted in movies in 1967. Her first role was Nadezhda in Kira Muratova's film Brief Encounters.

== Death ==
Ruslanova died from a long illness complicated by COVID-19 and pneumonia on 21 November 2021, during the COVID-19 pandemic in Russia. She was 75.

== Selected filmography ==
- 1967 — Brief Encounters (Russian: Короткие встречи) as Nadezhda, housekeeper
- 1975 — Afonya (Афоня) as Tamara
- 1980 — Do Not Shoot at White Swans (Не стреляйте в белых лебедей) as Haritina Makarovna
- 1982 — Tears Were Falling (Слёзы капали) as Dina, girlfriend Vasin's
- 1982 — Find and Neutralize (Найти и обезвредить) as Nyura
- 1982 — The Train Has Stopped (Остановился поезд) as Maria Ignatyevna, party secretary
- 1982 — Be My Husband (Будьте моим мужем) as Albina Petrovna
- 1983 — Among Grey Stones (Среди серых камней) as housekeeper
- 1983 — Twice Born (Дважды рождённый)
- 1984 — My Friend Ivan Lapshin (Мой друг Иван Лапшин) as Natasha Adashova
- 1985 — Do Not Marry, Girls (Не ходите, девки, замуж) as Anisa Ilinichna
- 1986 — Kin-dza-dza! (Кин-дза-дза) as Galina Borisovna
- 1987 — Tomorrow Was the War (Завтра была война) as Comrade Polyakova
- 1987 — She with a Broom, He in a Black Hat (Она с метлой, он в чёрной шляпе) as Vasilisa
- 1988 — Heart of a Dog (Собачье сердце) as Darya Petrovna Ivanova
- 1991 — Promised Heaven (Небеса обетованные) as Jeanne's aunt, dressmaker from Tver
- 1991 — Afghan Breakdown (Афганский излом) as Tatyana
- 1992 — Trifles of Life (Мелочи жизни) as Natalia Yevdokimovna
- 1997 — Poor Sasha (Бедная Саша) as Beryozkin's ex-wife
- 1998 — The Circus Burned Down, and the Clowns Have Gone (Цирк сгорел, и клоуны разбежались) as Toma
- 1998 — Mama Don't Cry (Мама, не горюй) as Tanya's mother
- 1998 — Khrustalyov, My Car! (Хрусталёв, машину!) as wife of General
- 2002 — Chekhov's Motifs (Чеховские мотивы) as woman
- 2004 — The Tuner (Настройщик) as Lyuba
- 2004 — My Fair Nanny (Моя прекрасная няня) as aunt Faya
- 2006 — My Love (voice)
- 2007 — The Irony of Fate 2 (Ирония Судьбы. Продолжение) as neighbor
- 2010 — What Men Talk About (О чём говорят мужчины) as hotel administrator
- 2011 — Once Upon a Time There Lived a Simple Woman (Жила-была одна баба) as Kryachiha
- 2014 — Viy (Вий) as wife Yavtukh's
