= Twice Born (1983 film) =

- Russian: Дважды рождённый
- Directed by: Arkadi Sirenko
- Written by: Viktor Astafyev; Yevgeni Fyodorovsky
- Starring: Vyacheslav Baranov; Georgiy Drozd; Eduard Bocharov; Nina Ruslanova; Tatyana Dogileva
- Cinematography: Elizbar Karavayev
- Music by: Edison Denisov
- Release date: 1983
- Country: Soviet Union
- Language: Russian

Twice Born (Russian: Дважды рождённый) is a 1983 Soviet World War II film directed by Arkadi Sirenko.

== Plot ==
The film takes place in the White Sea in 1942. The film tells about the rookie Andrei Bulygin, who becomes an assistant of machine gunner on the ship, which is engaged in the delivery of soldiers and weapons to the fleet. When they set off, the Germans stoke the ship and only Andrei saved his life. Will he be able to withstand the cold and the German pilot attacking him?

== Cast ==
- Vyacheslav Baranov
- Georgiy Drozd
- Eduard Bocharov
- Nina Ruslanova
- Tatyana Dogileva
- Sergei Plotnikov
- Viktor Miroshnichenko
- Yury Nazarov
- Gennadi Korolkov
- Nikolay Volkov
