= Two in One (film) =

2007 film by Kira Muratova

- Два в одном
- Directed by: Kira Muratova
- Written by: Yevgeny Golubenko; Renata Litvinova
- Produced by: Oleg Kokhan
- Starring: Bohdan Stupka; Alexander Bashirov
- Production company: SOTA Cinema Group
- Release date: 2007
- Running time: 124 minutes
- Country: Ukraine

Two in One (Russian: «Два в одном», romanized: Dva v odnom, Ukrainian: «Два в одному», romanized: Dva v odnomu) is a film of 2007 by Russian-Ukrainian director Kira Muratova, starring Renata Litvinova, Nataliya Buzko, Bogdan Stupka and Alexander Bashirov. The film unites two different screenplays written by Yevgeny Golubenko and Renata Litvinova.

It received the Nika prize for Best Film of the Russian Commonwealth and Baltic States in 2006.

At the 2007 Russian Guild of Film Critics Awards Kira Muratova received the Best Director prize for the film.

== Plot ==
=== First Story: "The Stagehands" ===
In a theater, an actor is found hanging, having committed suicide. Early in the morning, stagehand Utkin (played by Alexander Bashirov) discovers the body hanging from a theater rigging bar. The actor is a clown, and his absence threatens to derail the upcoming performances, as there is no replacement. Actors and stage crew are too frightened to move the body from the stage's center until the police and forensic team arrive. Amid the eerie presence of the corpse, preparations for the show continue with rehearsals, revealing backstage tensions and personal conflicts among the eccentric theater staff. The story concludes with Utkin, who discovered the body, confronting and killing his long-standing rival—a janitor—by striking him with a hammer.

=== Second Story: "The Woman of Life" ===
The first story seamlessly transitions into the second. The murder is forgotten, and the suicide victim’s body remains onstage, while the audience gathers outside, eager for the sold-out premiere. The show’s director decides to proceed, instructing the actors to perform despite the grim circumstances. The performance begins, with snow falling in the auditorium and elaborate stage sets, where a large window reveals the action of the second story. Gradually, the play transforms into a film, shedding the theatrical stylization of the first part. Masha, a young woman, must maintain contact with her father (played by Bohdan Stupka) for financial reasons, tolerating his advances due to his loneliness and twisted desires. He pressures her to introduce him to a friend for New Year’s Eve, threatening assault if she refuses. Masha brings her father a simple, naive tram depot worker named Alisa (Renata Litvinova). Locking the doors, Masha’s father entertains both women, anticipating the night, and becomes infatuated with Alisa while Masha contemplates murdering him. On January 1, he calls Alisa, asking her to stay with him permanently, and she agrees.

== Production ==
Referring to the scene where Bogdan Stupka pulls Buzko's panties down, the actress said she hoped the shot wouldn't explicitly show her vulva, as it does. "I was sure that the scene would be filmed in such a way that it would be clear: they were taking off their tights, pants, but nothing superfluous would be seen. And when it came time to shoot this scene and there was half the film behind, I knew that the frame would be as it is. 'Kira, how? ..' - I asked. 'Yes, just like that,' was her answer. But I will say that in the context of the film, this scene is justified, although I do not like nudity," Buzko said.
