= The Sentimental Policeman =

1992 film directed by Kira Muratova

- Film poster
- Directed by: Kira Muratova
- Written by: Kira Muratova
- Produced by: Alexander Andreev; Hugh Borgia; Yuri Kovalenko
- Starring: Nikolai Shatokhin; Irina Kovalenko
- Cinematography: Gennadi Karyuk
- Edited by: Valentina Olejnik
- Production companies: Parimedia; Primodessa Film
- Release date: 1992
- Running time: 119 minutes
- Countries: Ukraine; France
- Language: Russian

The Sentimental Policeman (Russian: «Чувствительный милиционер», Ukrainian: «Чутливий міліціонер», French: Le Milicien amoureux) is a 1992 Ukrainian (Ukrainian-French coproduction) comedy film written and directed by Kira Muratova. It entered the competition at the 49th Venice International Film Festival.

== Plot ==
A child is found in a cabbage, and the event will change the life of the policeman Tolik.

== Cast ==
- Nikolai Shatokhin as Tolik
- Irina Kovalenko as Klava
- Natalya Ralleva as Zakharova
- Dasha Koval as Natasha
- Yuri Shlykov as doctor
- Alexandra Svenska as nurse
