= Goddess: How I fell in Love =

- Directed by: Renata Litvinova
- Written by: Renata Litvinova
- Produced by: Renata Litvinova; Sergei Melkunov; Elena Yatsura
- Starring: Renata Litvinova; Maksim Sukhanov
- Cinematography: Vladislav Opelyants
- Music by: Igor Vdovin; Zemfira
- Production company: Slovo
- Release date: 2004
- Running time: 105 minutes
- Country: Russia
- Language: Russian

Goddess: How I fell in Love (Russian: Богиня: Как я полюбила, romanized: Boginya: Kak ya polyubila) is a 2004 drama film, directorial debut of Renata Litvinova.

== Plot ==
Police investigator Faina lives alone, because of work she always comes home very late. She often drowns her sorrows in alcohol because of her stressful and dangerous job. Faina does not have the time or energy for romantic relationships. She looks at everyone with the eyes of the investigator; in everyone she sees a criminal or a maniac.

Faina is investigating a mysterious disappearance of a girl. They are looking for the child for a year and the relatives have almost lost all hope. Faina continues to search, feeling that the girl is alive.

== Cast ==
- Renata Litvinova — Faina, investigator
- Konstantin Murzenko — investigator Yegorov (Yagurov)
- Maksim Sukhanov — Professor
- Dmitry Ulyanov — Nikolay
- Andrey Krasko — doctor Pavel
- Elena Rufanova — doctor Elena
- Svetlana Svetlichnaya — ghost mom
- Viktor Sukhorukov — Victor Iliazarovich
- Konstantin Khabensky — Polosoyev
- Olga Blok-Mirimskaya — Aglaya
- Polina Borisova — missing girl, daughter of Victor
