= The Asthenic Syndrome =

1989 film

- Directed by: Kira Muratova
- Written by: Aleksandr Chernykh; Sergei Popov; Kira Muratova
- Produced by: Micha Lampert
- Starring: Olga Antonova
- Cinematography: Vladimir Pankov
- Edited by: Valentina Olejnik
- Production company: Odessa Film Studio
- Release date: 1989
- Running time: 153 minutes
- Country: Soviet Union
- Language: Russian

The Asthenic Syndrome (Russian: «Астенический синдром», romanized: Astenicheskiy sindrom) is a 1989 Soviet drama film directed by Kira Muratova. It is the sixth feature film directed by Muratova, and arguably her masterpiece, most important film and best known film. The film was entered into the 40th Berlin International Film Festival where it won the Silver Bear - Special Jury Prize. It also won 1991 Nika Award in Russia.

== Plot ==
The film consists of two parts: the first part is shot in black-and-white and the second in color.

In the first part Natasha, the main character, attends her husband's funeral when she suddenly loses control, overwhelmed by extreme rage and despair. She walks away from the funeral and begins to treat everybody provocatively and aggressively. After resigning from her job as a doctor at a hospital, she seeks sex with two random strangers. The first encounter ends in confusion and anger, but the second leads to a fling that she regrets, panicking once he attempts to kiss her. In the end, Natasha finally regains control and is able to accept an act of kindness from a stranger.

We then realize that the first part was a film screening in a theater as the second part starts. Shot in color, the second part has as its protagonist an exhausted and disillusioned school teacher Nikolai who fell asleep at the screening of the black-and-white film. The audience ignores the screener's plea to stay for the Q&A with the film’s actress ("Olga Serghjevna") and leave the theater disorderly and raucously. (Muratova ironically mocks the general public’s response to her own films.) This sleeping schoolteacher awakens and leaves the theatre, but falls asleep again in the overcrowded subway and then at a meeting at school. The film suggests that as a result of personal predicaments and problems at work, Nikolai has gotten the Asthenic Syndrome – he falls asleep at the most inappropriate times. (“Asthenia” means “a lack of strength, diminution of vital power, weakness, debility,” according to the OED.) He is admitted to the hospital for the mentally ill where he gains the understanding that the people around him are not saner nor crazier than those who are free. After some time he is released and he ends up falling asleep on the subway. The empty wagon takes the sleeping man into a dark tunnel.

== Cast ==
- Olga Antonova as Natalia Ivanovna
- Sergei Popov as Nikolai Alekseevich
- Galina Zakhurdayeva as Masha (Blonde)
- Nataliya Buzko as Masha (Brunette)
- Aleksandra Svenskaya as Teacher
- Pavel Polishchuk as Iunikov
- Natalya Ralleva as Mother
- Galina Kasperovich as Nikolai's Wife
- Viktor Aristov as School Principal
- Nikolai Semyonov as Head Doctor
- Oleg Shkolnik as the owner of the canaries
- Vera Storozheva as secretary
- Aleksandr Chernykh as episode
- Leonid Kushnir as a patient
- Galina Stakhanova as doctor of the Moscow metro

== Theme and style ==
Masha Sotskaya writes in The Legacy Of Kira Muratova’s “The Asthenic Syndrome” that

The Asthenic Syndrome, often described as “the last Soviet and the first post-Soviet film”, begins with the depiction of a black-and-white drama centered on a recently widowed woman and her desperate and self destructive protests against the world. This section concludes quickly and is revealed to be part of a Post-Modern film-within-a film sequence, and as the images change from black-and-white to color the scene shifts to a crowded cinema screening this black-and-white movie. The film consists of two parts that are barely connected. This technique is one that Muratova has used in many of her films over the decades.

Film scholar Jane A. Taubman sees in many "unpleasant" scenes an attempt by the director to lead the audience out of the "moral apathy" in which Soviet society finds itself in its last years. She compares the image of nudity with the film Save and Protect by Alexander Sokurov. The era of glasnost, Taubman believes, begins with Tengiz Abuladze's Repentance and ends with Asthenic syndrome. In her review, she concludes that the film is the most important achievement in the work of Kira Muratova, but the means and message presented by the director preclude its commercial success. She writes, in her survey article The Cinema of Kira Muratova, that

... her most important film, Asthenic Syndrome, made in 1989 and released in early 1990. Two-and-one-half hours long and extremely complex stylistically and thematically, .... The medical syndrome from which the film takes its title is a condition of absolute physical and psychological exhaustion, a metaphor for Soviet society in its final years. The hero, Nikolai, a secondary school teacher (Sergei Popov), keeps falling asleep at inappropriate moments, such as a parent-teacher meeting. But his narcolepsy is a psychological defense against a world whose moral degradation has become unbearable. Though the horrors with which Muratova assaults her viewer were those of contemporary Soviet society,...

Asthenic Syndrom expressed deep despair at and moral disintegration of Soviet personal and public life. Those who could not, or would not, see the prophetic, Tolstoyan moral vision in the film tarred it epithet "chernukha" (roughly "black stuff"), an excessively black depiction of reality.

Asthenic syndrome ... used an aesthetic that Muratova finds intriguing: "the aesthetic of garbage, trash, eclectic combinations of rubbish, but the construction site expresses laconically what I have in mind." Critic Andrei Plakhov has the look of this film as "contemporary kitsch, picturesque sots-art [growing out of] the atmosphere of our towns and hamlets, and their continual construction sites: building, unfinished-building, re-building, migration of masses of humanity, the interface between village and city, the traditional neglect of public culture and the poetic cult of the romance of the road. ... A kind of socialist Desert."

About the Tolstoyan moral vision mentioned above, Muratova also states that

I could dedicate this film to Tolstoy. This is the key to my film. He says things about the naivety of the intelligentsia who believe culture and art can transform the world… I believe we can only draw attention, provoke, make people think. Try to refine the soul and raise the mental level. But the essence of what is inside cannot be changed. This film is a tragedy consecrated to that fact.

== Reception ==
The film was awarded two prizes: Nika Award (Best Feature Film 1991), Special Jury Prize at the Berlin Film Festival (1990); in addition, the film received four nominations.

In the press of the 90s, the film was often considered a criticism of Soviet reality, but Oleg Kovalov does not agree with this opinion. The critic notes in the film the presence of an "internal monologue" expressed by reading excerpts from the work written by the main character - the teacher, comparing this aspect with Federico Fellini's 8½. American critic Jonathan Rosenbaum argues that Asthenic Syndrome "breaks all the usual rules" of cinema, and also calls it a "masterpiece of glasnost cinema."
