= Among Grey Stones =

1983 film

- Directed by: Kira Muratova
- Written by: Vladimir Korolenko
- Starring: Igor Sharapov
- Cinematography: Aleksei Rodionov
- Production company: Odessa Film Studio
- Release date: 1983
- Running time: 88 minutes
- Country: Soviet Union
- Language: Russian

Among Grey Stones (Russian: «Среди серых камней», romanized: Sredi serykh kamney, Ukrainian: «Серед сірих каменів») is a 1983 Soviet historical drama film directed by Kira Muratova. The film suffered a lot from the Soviet censorship and was edited without the acceptance of Muratova, so she refused to release it under her name - it was attributed to "Ivan Sidorov" (a common Russian name and surname). It was screened in the Un Certain Regard section at the 1988 Cannes Film Festival.

== Plot ==
A judge becomes despondent and neglectful of his children after his wife's death, trapped in a cycle of painful memories and irritation with the world around him. His ten-year-old son, Vasya, feeling isolated and stifled at home, seeks escape and solace outside. He befriends two children, Valek and Marusya, who live with a destitute beggar in the ruins of an abandoned, overgrown church near a cemetery. Vasya finds a sense of freedom and companionship with his new friends, and, at times, even experiences fleeting happiness.

As he grows closer to Valek and Marusya, Vasya begins to feel sympathy for his father’s loneliness and regrets his father’s distance from him. In an attempt to bring some joy to the ailing Marusya, he secretly takes a porcelain doll from his sister to give to her. This act, however, stirs up tension in his family, illustrating the conflicting pull between his love for his family and his desire to connect with his friends from the marginalized world they inhabit. Vasya comes to understand the complexities of loss, compassion, and the fragile connections that can arise in the face of adversity.

== Cast ==
- Igor Sharapov as Vasya
- Oksana Shlapak as Marusya
- Stanislav Govorukhin as judge
- Roman Levchenko as Valyok
- Sergei Popov as Valentin
- Viktor Aristov as beggar
- Viktor Gogolev as Jean
- Fyodor Nikitin as Professor
- Vladimir Pozhidayev as General
- Nina Ruslanova as housekeeper
