= Chekhov's Motifs =

2002 film

- Directed by: Kira Muratova
- Written by: Yevgeni Golubenko; Kira Muratova
- Produced by: Igor Kalyonov
- Starring: Sergey Bekhterev
- Cinematography: Valeri Makhnev
- Release date: 26 June 2002
- Running time: 120 minutes
- Countries: Russia; Ukraine
- Language: Russian

Chekhov's Motifs (Russian: «Чеховские мотивы», romanized: Chekhovskiye motivy, also released in English as Chekhovian Motifs) is a 2002 Russian-Ukrainian comedy film directed by Kira Muratova. It was entered into the 24th Moscow International Film Festival. At the 2002 Russian Guild of Film Critics Awards Kira Muratova received the prize for Best Director. It is based on two works of Anton Chekhov: the short story Difficult People is divided to frame the one act play Tatyana Repina.

== Plot ==
In the large Shiryaev family, the eldest son, Pyotr, a university student, struggles to free himself from his domineering father. His meek mother tries to shield him, while his 13-year-old sister Varvara remains indifferent to the family's conflicts. As Pyotr leaves home to head to the city for his studies, he unexpectedly finds himself at a rural church where a wedding of visiting bohemians is taking place. During the lengthy church service, the guests, restless and bored, are suddenly distracted by a peculiar sight: a woman cloaked in black, moaning softly, appears within the church. Some guests, followed by the groom himself, begin to believe she is the ghost of his former lover, who had taken her own life.

== Cast ==
- Sergey Bekhterev
- Nina Ruslanova
- Nataliya Buzko
- Philip Panov (as Filipp Panov)
- Zhan Daniel
- Aleksandr Bashirov
- Yuri Shlykov
