= Three Stories (1997 film) =

1997 crime comedy film

- Film poster
- Directed by: Kira Muratova
- Written by: Sergei Chetvyortkov; Renata Litvinova; Vera Storozheva
- Produced by: Igor Tolstunov
- Starring: Sergey Makovetskiy; Renata Litvinova; Oleg Tabakov
- Cinematography: Gennadi Karyuk
- Production company: NTV-Profit
- Release date: 13 March 1997
- Running time: 105 minutes
- Countries: Russia; Ukraine
- Language: Russian

Three Stories (Russian: «Три истории», romanized: Tri istorii, Ukrainian: «Три історії», romanized: Try istorii) is a 1997 Russian-Ukrainian crime comedy film directed by Kira Muratova. It was entered into the 47th Berlin International Film Festival. The picture won the Special Jury Prize at Kinotavr.

The film is dedicated to the memory of Sergei Gerasimov.

Among seven other films by Muratova, it is included in the list of List of the 100 best films in the history of Ukrainian cinema.

The film is an anthology film, featuring three different stories. In Boiler Room No. 6, two friends converse in a boiler room. One of them keeps complaining about an unbearable neighbor who is stalking him both at home and at work. What he is not mentioning in the conversation is that he has already killed her and hidden her body. Ophelia focuses on a misanthropic hospital archivist, who is particularly resentful of mothers who abandon their children. So, she proceeds to murder one these uncaring mothers. In A Girl and Death, an old man reluctantly befriends a little girl from his neighborhood, though she irritates him. The girl poisons his water, with the expectation that she and her mother will take over his room after his death.

== Plot ==
The film consists of three novellas the plot of which is based on criminal stories that do not have usual logical motives. The people who become killers in all these episodes are the ones who at first glance seem to be completely incapable of murder.

=== The First Story "Boiler Room No. 6" ===
A modest employee brings a cupboard to the boiler room for his friend, Tikhomirov. He works as a stoker, writes poetry in his spare time and rents out a place for intimate pleasure to local homosexuals.

During a normal conversation between old acquaintances, Tikhomirov time after time returns to the story of his unbearable neighbor who does not let him live in peace and even comes to his workplace in order to compromise him... Tikhomirov gets interrupted and is not able to get to the point of his request by frequenters of the depraved corner, who by the way also see him as an object for pleasure and even offer money to him...

In the closet lies the naked corpse of Tikhomirov's neighbor (she walked around the house like this), which he intends to burn in the boiler room.

=== The Second Story "Ophelia" ===
Ofa works in a hospital archive. She does not like men, women, or children: "I would rate this planet as zero." Her attention is especially directed towards those mothers who abandon their children in a maternity hospital.

A gynecologist makes advances towards Ofa, whom she uses for an alibi at the moment she commits the murder of a disowning mother.

Her literary ideal is Shakespeare's Ophelia, whose fate Ofa arranges for a single woman – her own mother, Alexandra Ivanovna Ivanova, who many years ago gave her up.

=== The Third Story "A Girl and Death" ===
An elderly man in a wheelchair operates a coffee grinder. A little girl who lives nearby plays with him, irritating and annoying the old man from time to time. From the mouth of the baby resonates the neighbor's expectation, that after his death she together with her mother will get his room.

The old man teaches the girl how to play chess, reads a book to her, and she in turn brings a glass of water containing rat poison. After drinking a cup of water, the old man dies.

== Cast ==
- Sergey Makovetskiy as Tikhomirov
- Leonid Kushnir as Gena
- Jean Daniel as Venia
- Renata Litvinova as Ofa; Ofelia
- Ivan Okhlobystin as Doctor
- Nataliya Buzko as Tanya
- Oleksandra Svenska as Aleksandra Ivanovna Ivanova
- Oleg Tabakov as Old Man
- Liliya Murlykina as Girl
