= The Tuner =

- DVD cover
- Russian: Настройщик
- Directed by: Kira Muratova
- Written by: Sergey Chetvertkov; Yevgeny Golubenko; Kira Muratova
- Produced by: Sergey Chliyants; Vladimir Ignatiev; Alexander Bokovikov
- Starring: Alla Demidova; Nina Ruslanova; Renata Litvinova; Georgy Deliev
- Cinematography: Gennady Karyuk
- Edited by: Valentina Oleinik
- Music by: Valentyn Silvestrov
- Production company: Pygmalion Production
- Release date: 2004
- Running time: 164 min.
- Countries: Russia; Ukraine
- Language: Russian

The Tuner (Russian: «Настройщик», romanized: Nastroyshchik; Ukrainian: «Настроювач», romanized: Nastroiuvach) is a 2004 Ukraine/Russia mix film of art house grotesque and a sting comedy. At the heart of Kira Muratova’s film is her characteristic and enduring love of predation—predation for its own sake. The film offers a complex assessment of the human subject, civilization, and the creative act. It premiered out of competition at the 61st Venice International Film Festival

The stars of the film include famous Russian actors such as Alla Demidova, Renata Litvinova, Nina Ruslanova, Yuri Shlykov and Georgy Deliev. Directed by Kira Muratova, author of sixteen films over forty-two years, best known in the West for her political rehabilitation during the perestroika period and the un-shelving of her so-called provincial melodramas, Brief Encounters (1967/1987) and The Long Farewell (1971/1987). Ranks 75-80th in the list of 100 best films in the history of Ukrainian cinema.

== Plot summary ==
A former nurse, Liuba, seeking marriage through newspaper personal ads, is bilked by a stranger whom she mistakes for her new date. Liuba's elderly, well-to-do girlfriend, Anna Sergeevna is defrauded in a different fashion: having placed a newspaper ad for a piano tuner, she is entrapped by Andrei, who is not only an excellent tuner and musician, but also a reasonably good petty thief and scam artist. Andrei and his current lover, Lina, attempting to further secure the women's trust by returning Liuba's money, which had been scammed yet again by a second potential husband cum con-artist, place their own fake personal ad in a newspaper so as to locate the suspect. Having returned Liuba's stolen money, Andrei finally swindles both Liuba and Anna Sergeevna through an elaborate bank forgery scheme—in a word, a portrait of normal human nature à la Muratova.

== Awards ==
- Nika Award 2005 for Best Actress (Alla Demidova), Best Director (Kira Muratova), and Best Supporting Actress (Nina Ruslanova)
- Golden Eagle Award 2005 for Best Actress (Alla Demidova), Best Supporting Actress (Nina Ruslanova)
