= Kira Muratova =

Soviet and Ukrainian film director and screenwriter

- Кіра Муратова
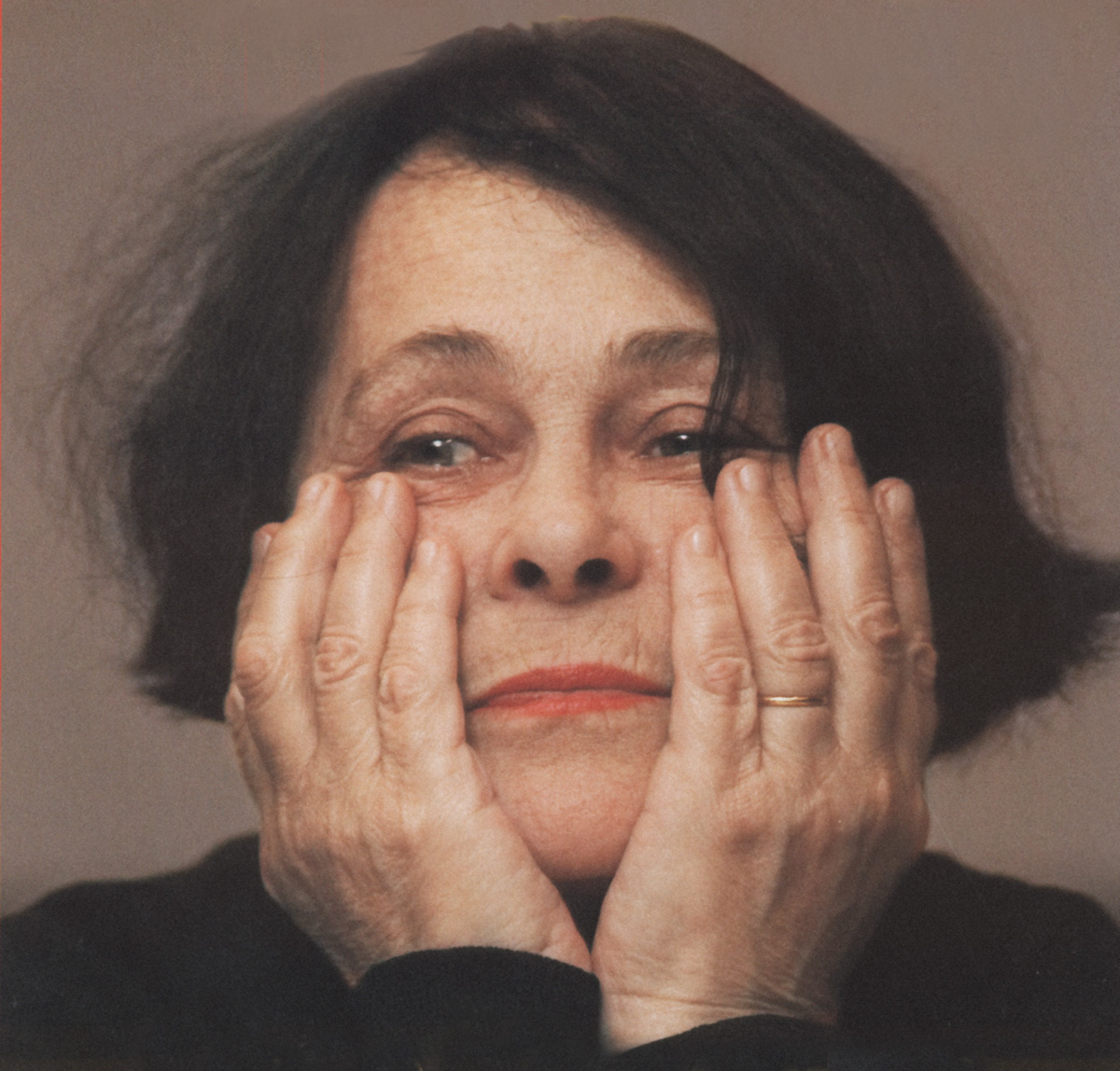
- Muratova in 2006
- Born: Kira Gueórguievna Korotkova; 5 November 1934; Soroca, Kingdom of Romania (now Moldova)
- Died: 6 June 2018 (aged 83); Odesa, Ukraine
- Occupations: Film director Screenwriter; Actress
- Years active: 1961–2018
- Spouses: Oleksandr Muratov; Evgeny Golubenko

Kira Georgievna Muratova (Romanian: Kira Gheórghievna Muratova; Russian: Кира Георгиевна Муратова; Ukrainian: Кіра Георгіївна Мура́това; née Korotkova, 5 November 1934 – 6 June 2018) was a Ukrainian award-winning film director, screenwriter and actress, known for her unusual directorial style.

Muratova's films underwent a great deal of censorship in the Soviet Union, yet still Muratova managed to emerge as one of the leading figures in contemporary cinema of Ukraine and Russian cinema and was able to build a very successful film career from 1960s onwards. She is People's Artist of Ukraine (1989); Academician of National Academy of Arts of Ukraine (1997). Laureate of the Shevchenko National Prize (1993) (in List of laureates at 1993 - No. 12); Oleksandr Dovzhenko State Prize (2002). Muratova spent much of her artistic career in Odesa, creating most of her films at Odesa Film Studios.

Her work has been described as possibly 'one of the most distinctive and singular oeuvres of cinematic world-making.'

== Biography ==
=== Early life and career ===
Kira Korotkova was born in 1934 in Soroca, Romania (present-day Moldova) to a Russian father and a Jewish mother. Her parents were both active communists and members of the Communist Party. Her father, Romanian: Gheorghe Corotcov, Russian: Юрий Коротков (1907–1941), participated in the anti-fascist guerilla movement in World War II, was arrested by Romanian forces and shot after interrogation. After the war, Kira lived in Bucharest with her mother, Romanian: Natalia Corotcov-Scurtu, was born Reznic, (1906–1981), a gynaecologist, who then pursued a government career in Socialist Romania.

In 1959, Kira graduated from the Gerasimov Institute of Cinematography in Moscow, specializing in directing. Upon graduation Korotkova received a director position with the Odesa Film Studio in Odesa, a port city at the Black Sea near to her native Bessarabia. She directed her first professional film in 1961 and worked with the studio until a professional conflict made her to move to Leningrad in 1978. There she made one film with Lenfilm Studio, but returned to Odesa afterwards. Muratova's films came under constant criticism of the Soviet officials due to her idiosyncratic film language that did not comply with the norms of socialist realism. Film scholar Isa Willinger has compared Muratova's cinematographic form to the Soviet Avant-garde, especially to Eisenstein's montage of attractions. Several times Muratova was banned from working as a director for a number of years each time.

Kira married her fellow Odesa studio director Oleksandr Muratov in the early 1960s and co-created several films with him. The couple had a daughter, Marianna, but soon divorced and Muratov moved to Kyiv where he started work with Dovzhenko Film Studios. Kira Muratova kept her ex-husband's surname despite her later marriage to Leningrad painter and production designer Evgeny Golubenko.

=== Post-Soviet period ===
In the 1990s, an extremely productive period began for Muratova, during which she shot a feature film every two or three years, often working with the same actors and crew. Her work The Asthenic Syndrome (1989) was described as 'an absurdist masterpiece' and was the only film to be banned (due to male and female nudity) during the Soviet Union perestroika. Her other films released in this period include The Sentimental Policeman (1992), Passions (1994), Three Stories (1997) and a short film Letter to America (1999).

Two actresses Muratova has repeatedly cast are Renata Litvinova and Nataliya Buzko. Muratova's films were usually productions of Ukraine or co-productions between Ukraine and Russia, always in the Russian language, although Muratova could speak Ukrainian and did not object to the Ukrainianization of Ukrainian cinema. Muratova supported the Euromaidan protesters and the following 2014 Ukrainian revolution.

Muratova's films were premiered at International Film Festivals in Berlin (1990, 1997), Cannes, Moscow, Rome, Venice and others.

Next to Aleksandr Sokurov, Muratova was considered the most idiosyncratic contemporary Russian-language film director. Her works can be seen as postmodern, employing eclecticism, parody, discontinuous editing, disrupted narration and intense visual and sound stimuli, and her 'bitter humour reflecting a violent, loveless, morally empty society. In her film Three Stories, she explores how 'evil is hidden in a beautiful... innocent shell, and corpses form part of the décor.' She was an admirer of Sergei Parajanov and her focus on 'ornamentalism' has been likened to his and was also anti-realist, with 'repetition giving shape to all possibility', with her last film, Eternal Homecoming effectively about cinema itself being unfinished, it is almost as if the 'spool of cinema keeps threading and tangling, threading and tangling'.

=== Recognition and awards ===
It was only during Perestroyka that Muratova received wide public recognition and first awards. In 1988, the International Women's Film Festival Créteil (France) showed a first retrospective of her works. Her film Among Grey Stones was screened in the Un Certain Regard section at the 1988 Cannes Film Festival.

In 1990, her film Asthenic Syndrome won the Silver Bear Jury Grand Prix at the Berlinale. In 1994, she was awarded the Leopard of Honour for her life oeuvre at The Locarno International Film Festival (Switzerland) and in 2000, she was given the Andrzej Wajda Freedom Award. In 1997, her film Three Stories was entered into the 47th Berlin International Film Festival.

Her 2002 film Chekhov's Motifs was entered into the 24th Moscow International Film Festival. Her film The Tuner was shown at the Venice Film Festival in 2004. Her films received the Russian "Nika" prize in 1991, 1995, 2005, 2007, 2009 and 2013. In 2005, a retrospective was shown at the Lincoln Center in New York City. In 2013, a full retrospective of her films was shown at the International Film Festival Rotterdam.

- Order of Prince Yaroslav the Wise
- Order of Friendship
- People's Artist of Ukraine
- 1993 Shevchenko National Prize

== Filmography ==
Year	Title (Original)	Title (English)	Director	Writer	Actress	Notes
1961	У Крутого Яра	By the Steep Ravine	Yes	Yes		With Aleksandr Muratov
1964	Наш честный хлеб	Our Honest Bread	Yes		as Agapa	With Aleksandr Muratov
1967	Короткие встречи	Brief Encounters	Yes	Yes	as Valentina Ivanovna	
1971	Долгие проводы	The Long Farewell	Yes			
1972	Россия	Russia				Documentary; with Theodore Holcomb
1978	Познавая белый свет	Getting to Know the Big, Wide World	Yes	Yes		
1983	Среди серых камней	Among Grey Stones	Yes			Renounced by Muratova after major political censorship (credited to "Ivan Sidorov" )
1987	Перемена участи	Change of Fate	Yes	Yes		
1989	Астенический синдром	The Asthenic Syndrome	Yes	Yes		
1992	Чувствительный милиционер	The Sentimental Policeman	Yes	Yes		
1994	Увлеченья	Passions	Yes			
1997	Три истории	Three Stories	Yes			
1999	Письмо в Америку	Letter to America	Yes			Short
2001	Второстепенные люди	Minor People	Yes	Yes		
2002	Чеховские мотивы	Chekhov's Motifs	Yes	Yes		
2004	Настройщик	The Tuner	Yes	Yes		
2005	Справка	Certification	Yes			Short
2006	Кукла	Dummy	Yes			Short
2007	Два в одном	Two in One	Yes			
2009	Мелодия для шарманки	Melody for a Street-organ	Yes	Yes		
2012	Вечное возвращение	Eternal Return	Yes	Yes		

== Books ==
Upon an initiative of the arts patron Yuri Komelkov, Atlant UMC has published an album on Kira Muratova's work. In this album, the author of the photos, Konstantin Donin, confined himself to the film set frames, acting as a screen reporter of the film Two-in-one.

In 2005, a study on the life and work of Muratova was published by I.B. Tauris in the KINOfiles Filmmakers' Companion series.

== See also ==
- List of female directors
- Women's cinema
- Cinema of Ukraine

== Literature ==
- Donin [Донин, К. А.]. Кадр за кадром: Кира Муратова. Хроника одного фильма. К.: ООО «Атлант-ЮЭмСи», 2007. 119 с. ISBN 978-966-8968-11-2. (in Russian)
- Lawton, Anna M. (2004). Imaging Russia 2000: Film and Facts. New Academia Publishing. p. 210. ISBN 0-9744934-2-2.
