= Renata Litvinova =

Russian actress, film director and screenwriter (born 1967)

- Рената Литвинова
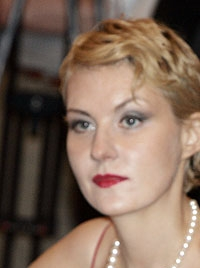
- Litvinova in June 2007
- Born: 12 January 1967 (age 59); Moscow, Soviet Union
- Occupations: Film actress, director, screenwriter
- Spouses: Alexander Antipov (m. 1996; div. 1997) Leonid Dobrovsky (m. 2001; div. 2007)
- Children: 1 daughter

Renata Muratovna Litvinova (Russian: Рената Муратовна Литвинова; born 12 January 1967) is a Russian actress, film director, and screenwriter.

== Biography ==
Renata Litvinova was born in Moscow to Volga Tatar father Murat Aminovich Vergazov and a Russian mother, Alisa Mikhailovna Litvinova. Both her parents were doctors. They divorced when Renata was just one year old. After school, she entered VGIK in 1984 and graduated in 1989. She attended the same year as fellow screenwriters and directors Roman Kachanov and Arkady Vysotsky. It is here where she worked on her first film as a screenwriter for the film The Much Loved Rita. The Last Meeting with Her (1988).

== Career ==
=== Screenwriter ===
Litvinova began her film career as a screenwriter, writing films from 1988 to 1998. None of her earlier projects such as Truck Drivers 2 (1992) achieved any critical or commercial acclaim. She was discovered by fellow director Kira Muratova in 1994 after Muratova had come across Litvinova's thesis she had written for VGIK. Meeting one another at a local festival, Muratova changed her mind and instead wanted Litvinova to star in one of her films. Litvinova auditioned for the role of the female protagonist Violet but was deemed unsuitable. However, Muratova wanted her in the film and allowed her to write a role for herself. Litvinova wrote herself into the film as a nurse. She continued to write screenplays after her role, which included both Male Revelations (1995) and Principled and Compassionate View (1995). The latter film won the Jury prize at the "Window to Europe" Film festival and was showcased in a number of other festivals around the world such as Japan and Germany. She collaborated with Muratova again in 1997 and 1998, writing two screenplays that Muratova directed. Litvinova's screenplay Three Stories was turned into a film in 1997, she also played the role of Opha in it. Her story To Own and Belong was adapted into the critically acclaimed crime film Country of the Deaf in 1998. In 2017 Renata made her full debut in theatre with her own piece called "The North Wind" in Moscow Art Theatre. She was the director and screenwriter, as well as she played the key role in "The North Wind".

=== Actress ===
By 2022, Litvinova has gained a status of one of the leading Russian actresses both in TV and theatre. In 2000, she grew popular for her role of Albino Crow in the TV series The Border. She wrote screenplays for films sparingly after this role and starred in all of the films she wrote. Litvinova became acclaimed in the mid-2000s when she was nominated for her roles in Sky. Plane. Girl. (2002), The Tuner (2004) and I'm Not Hurt (2006). In the Moscow Chekhov Art Theatre, Litvinova played Lyubov Ranevskaya in The Cherry Orchard, she also played in Le Shaga written by Marguerite Duras and staged by Marie-Louise Bischofberger, ‘Witness for the Prosecution’ by Agatha Christie.

=== Director ===
As a director, Litvinova tried herself in many fields. She made her directorial debut in 2000 with the documentary There is No Death For Me. The film focused on the experiences of Litvinova's favorite Soviet Era actresses and gave insight into her views on their stories. As with her screenwriting, she directed sparingly in between her acting roles, directing six films since 2000. She directed her first feature film in 2004, The Goddess, which she also wrote and starred in. In 2006, she directed her first short film, Rado. Litvinova made her first foray into concert films in 2008 when she directed the film Green Theatre in Zemfira. The film was created using footage from a concert of one of Litvinova's friends, musical artist Zemfira Ramazanova. The film won "music film of the year" from independent music award show "Steppenwolf". The two collaborated again in 2010 to create another Ramazanova concert film directed by Litvinova called Moscow. Crokus/Arrow. Finally, Ramazanova served as the composer on Litvinova's second full-length feature film Rita's Last FairyTale (2012), which deals with "universal themes of love, hate and search for love."

Through the years, Litvinova directed more than 15 video clips for Russian musicians and singers, since 2005 they mostly collaborated with Zemfira. In 2021, she directed a 13-minute promo film for Gucci.

Renata Litvinova directed the film Joseph's Dreams, about the poet Joseph Brodsky, as the concluding part of the Petersburg: Only for Love almanac.

=== Voice actress ===
She lent her voice to the film $8.50 (1999) to be used as a voiceover for the character Xenia who was played by Natalia Adreichenko. Her voice appeared in a number of other films in the 2000s, including Frog's Paradise (2007) and Peregrine (2008).

=== Fashion and TV ===
On TV, Litvinova hosted several author's programs on style, history of fashion and cinematography. Litvinova had also emerged as a designer and fashion icon of her own. A friend and collaborator of Demna Gvasalia; she also worked on Gosha Rubchinskiy's film, 'The Day of My Death'.

== Personal life ==
Her first marriage was to producer Alexander Antipov, a union that lasted from 1996 to 1997. She then married businessman Leonid Dobrovsky, with whom she had her daughter Ulyana. The couple divorced in 2007. Litvinova came out as bisexual in 2021.

In February 2022, she opposed the Russian invasion of Ukraine, and left Russia. In the meantime, she had decided to reside with her partner Zemfira in Paris.

== Filmography ==
Year	Film							
Year	Film	Director	Screenwriter	Voice Actor	Producer	Actress	Role	Notes
1990	Leningrad. November.		check					
1991	Not Love		check					
1992	Tractor Drivers 2		check					
1994	Passions		check			check	nurse Lily	
1995	Male Revelations		check					
1995	Principled and Compassionate View		check					
1997	Three Stories		check			check	Opha	
1998	Country of the Deaf		check					
1999	The Right to Choose					check	Nika	
1999	$8.50			check			Xenia (role played by Natalia Adreichenko)	
2000	The Border					check	Albino Crow	
2000	There is No Death For Me	check						Documentary film
2001	The Black Room					check	dealer in a casino	
2001	Berlin Express					check	intelligence agent	
2001	April					check	Nastasia	
2002	Sky. Plane. Girl.		check		check	check	Lara the stewardess	
2003	The Suitcases of Tulse Luper (Part III)					check	Constance Bulitsky	
2004	The Tuner					check	Lina	
2004	The Goddess	check	check		check	check	investigator Faina	
2004	Saboteur					check	chief of station	
2005	Dead Man's Bluff					check	waitress/secretary Katya	
2005	Vocal Parallels					check	entertainer	
2006	Nine Months					check		
2006	Tin Plate					check	wife of a nude man	
2006	It Doesn't Hurt Me					check	Tata	
2006	Rado	check						Short Film
2007	Two in One		check			check	Alissa	
2007	Cruelty		check			check	Zoya Andreyevna Vyatkina	
2007	Frog's Paradise			check				
2008	To Catch a Brunette					check	woman in the photograph - Masha's Mom	
2008	Peregrine			check			Gala	
2008	The Adventures of Alyonushka and Eremu			check			Aunt Yefrosinya	
2008	Green Theatre in Zemfira	check			check			Full-length concert film
2009	Jolly Fellows					check	Eugenia, wife of Rosa	
2009	Ordered to be Destroyed! Operation "Chinese Box"					check	Charlotte	
2009	Melody for a Street Organ					check	Kitty	
2009	The Golden Section					check	Katyusha, the owner of the photo studio	
2010	Rorrima Bo's Magic Cup					check	senior pioneer leader, witch	
2010	Diamonds. Theft.					check	woman with a big nose	
2010	Moscow. Crocus/Arrow	check						
2011	Generation P					check	Alla	
2011	Heart of a Boomerang					check	enchantress	
2012	Rita's Last Fairy Tale	check	check		check	check	Tanya Neubivko	
2012	The Girl and Death					check	Nina	
2012	Eternal Return					check	She	
2014	Concrete Gene					check	Chief editor of "Our Crime"	
2015	About Love					check	lecturer	
2016	The Day of My Death	check	check			check	not credited	Short Film
2018	ANGST					check	Frau Doktor Oberhaupt	
2020	The North Wind	check	check		check	check	Margarita	

== Awards and honours ==
- Best Acting Debut at Kinotavr for her role in "Passions" (1994)
- "Woman-style" Film Award for her role in "Passions" (1994)
- Best Actress at Yekaterinburg film festival for her role in "Three Stories" (1997)
- Best Supporting Actress at the International Film Festival "Baltic Pearl" in Riga, Jurmala, for her role "Three Stories" (1997)
- Laurel branch for "There is no death for me" (2000)
- State Prize of the Russian Federation for her role in "Border. Taiga Affair" (2001)
- Best Actress at RKF "Literature and Cinema" in Gatchina for her role in "Heaven. Plane. Woman" (2003)
- Honoured Artist of the Russian Federation (2003)
- Best Actress for CF "Viva Cinema of Russia" in St. Petersburg for her role in "The Tuner" (2005)
- Jury Special Mention at International Film Festival in Wiesbaden goEast for her role in "Goddess: How I Fell in Love" (2005)
- Jury Special Mention at International Film Festival in Wiesbaden goEast for her role in "The Tuner" (2005)
- Best Actress at Kinotavr for her role in "I'm not hurt" (2006)
- National award of public recognition of the achievements of women "Olympia" of the Russian Academy of Business and Entrepreneurship (2007)
- Pushkin Medal (2012)
- Best Actress, film About Love, The Golden Unicorn Awards 2016
