= Sin (2019 film) =

- Directed by: Andrei Konchalovsky
- Written by: Elena Kiseleva; Andrei Konchalovsky
- Produced by: Elda Ferri; Olesya Gidrat; Andrei Konchalovskiy; Alisher Burkhanovich Usmanov
- Starring: Alberto Testone; Julia Vysotskaya; Massimo De Francovich; Orso Maria Guerrini; Antonio Gargiulo; Jakob Diehl; Nicola Adobati
- Cinematography: Aleksandr Simonov
- Edited by: Karolina Masejewska; Sergey Taraskin
- Music by: Eduard Artemyev
- Production companies: Andrei Konchalovsky Studios; Jean Vigo Italia; Rai Cinema; Perviy Kanal
- Distributed by: Walt Disney Studios Sony Pictures Releasing CIS (Russia); 01 Distribution (Italy); ARRI Media International (Worldwide)
- Release date: October 27, 2019 (Rome Film Festival)
- Running time: 134 minutes
- Countries: Russia; Italy
- Language: Italian

Sin (Russian: Грех; Italian: Il peccato – Il furore di Michelangelo) is a Russian-Italian biographical drama film written and directed by Andrei Konchalovsky released in October 2019.

== Plot ==
The film tells about the life of the famous sculptor and painter of the Renaissance, Michelangelo Buonarroti of Florence, in the early 16th century. Michelangelo is a pious and argumentative artist. Although widely considered a genius by his contemporaries, Michelangelo Buonarroti (Alberto Testone) is reduced to poverty and depleted by his struggle to finish the ceiling of the Sistine Chapel. While painting the chapel he is also pressured to simultaneously complete the statues which are part of the tomb designed and intended for Pope Julius II.

When his commissioner and head of the Della Rovere nobility Pope Julius II dies, Michelangelo becomes obsessed with sourcing the finest marble to complete his tomb. The artist's loyalty is tested when Leo X, of the rival Medici family, ascends to the papacy and charges him with a lucrative new commission – the façade of the San Lorenzo basilica. Forced to lie to maintain favour with both families, Michelangelo is progressively tormented by suspicion and hallucinations, leading him to ruthlessly examine his own moral and artistic failings.

== Cast ==
- Alberto Testone as Michelangelo Buonarroti
- Jakob Diehl as Peppe
- Francesco Gaudiello as Pietro
- Antonio Gargiulo as Francesco Maria della Rovere
- Adriano Chiaramida as Ludovico Buonarroti
- Gianluca Guidi as Egidio da Viterbo
- Orso Maria Guerrini as Marchese Malaspina
- Glen Blackhall as Raphael
- Massimo De Francovich as Pope Julius II
- Nicola Adobati as Lorenzo de Medici duca d'Urbino
- Federico Vanni as Jacopo Sansovino
- Nicola De Paola as Cardinale Giulio de' Medici
- Antonio Gargiulo as Francesco Maria Della Rovere
- Riccardo Landi as Al Farab
- Simone Toffanin as Pope Leo X
- Julia Vysotskaya as Lady with an Ermine
- Toni Pandolfo as Dante Alighieri

== Reception ==
Sin has an approval rating of 94% on review aggregator website Rotten Tomatoes, based on 18 reviews, and an average rating of 7.3/10. It also has a score of 65 out of 100 on Metacritic, based on 8 critics, indicating "generally favorable reviews".

== See also ==
- Michelangelo in popular culture
