= Uncle Vanya (1970 film) =

- Directed by: Andrey Konchalovskiy
- Written by: Anton Chekhov (play Uncle Vanya); Andrey Konchalovskiy (screenplay)
- Starring: Innokenti Smoktunovsky; Sergei Bondarchuk; Irina Kupchenko; Irina Miroshnichenko; Irina Anisimova-Wulf; Vladimir Butenko; Yekaterina Mazurova; Nikolai Pastukhov; Innokenti Smoktunovsky; Vladimir Zeldin
- Cinematography: Yevgeni Guslinsky; Georgi Rerberg
- Edited by: L. Pokrovskoi
- Music by: Alfred Shnitke
- Distributed by: Mosfilm
- Release date: 1970
- Running time: 104 minutes
- Country: Soviet Union
- Language: Russian

Uncle Vanya (Russian: Дядя Ваня, romanized: Dyadya Vanya) is a 1970 film adaptation of the 1899 Anton Chekhov play of the same title and directed by Andrey Konchalovskiy.

== Plot summary ==
The drama centers on the return of Alexander Serebryakov, a retired professor, and his beautiful, much younger second wife, Yelena, to their country estate. This estate, managed by Vanya, the brother of the professor’s late first wife, has been the main source of income funding for the professor’s comfortable urban lifestyle. Vanya and the local physician, Doctor Astrov, are both captivated by Yelena’s presence, their yearning for her only deepening the sense of ennui and dissatisfaction that pervades their provincial lives. Vanya harbors resentment for years of hard work managing the estate to support Serebryakov, receiving only a small salary in return, while Doctor Astrov, though still a conscientious physician, has grown disillusioned and spends much of his time drinking.

Sofya, the professor’s daughter from his first marriage, also lives on the estate, dedicating herself to its upkeep alongside her uncle Vanya. She suffers from low self-esteem, lamenting her perceived lack of beauty and feeling the pain of her unrequited love for Astrov. Tensions come to a head when Serebryakov announces his plan to sell the estate to generate a higher income for himself and Yelena, disregarding that it has long been home to Vanya and Sofya. In the ensuing conflict, Vanya’s frustration erupts, as he faces the possibility of losing both his home and his purpose. But Yelena, although flattered by the attention of Vanya and Astrov, ultimately rejects both men, deepening the collective sense of disillusionment and loss.

== Cast ==
- Innokenti Smoktunovsky as Ivan "Uncle Vanya" Voinitsky
- Sergei Bondarchuk as Dr. Mikhail Lvovich Astrov
- Irina Kupchenko as Sofia "Sonya" Aleksandrovna Serebryakova
- Irina Miroshnichenko as Helena (Yelena) Andreevna Serebryakova
- Irina Anisimova-Wulf as Mariya Vasilievna Voinitskaya
- Yekaterina Mazurova as Marina Timofeyevna
- Nikolai Pastukhov as Iliya Ilich Telyegin
- Vladimir Zeldin as Professor Aleksandr Vladimirovich Serebryakov

== Critical reception ==
- The New York Times wrote, "this "Uncle Vanya" is an exceedingly graceful, beautifully acted production that manages to respect Chekhov as a man of his own time, as well as what I would assume to be the Soviet view of Chekhov as Russia's saddest, gentlest, funniest and most compassionate revolutionary playwright...For the most part, the film proceeds at Chekhov's own pace as the camera, which has the presence of a household intimate, follows the action in close-up, sometimes overhearing scenes from adjoining rooms, sometimes, as if by chance, becoming so involved in the action that it doesn't remember to give us an establishing shot until a scene is almost completed...Because there have been so few screen adaptations of Chekhov's plays seen here, it doesn't mean as much as I wish it did to say that the new Russian film version of "Uncle Vanya," which opened yesterday at the Regency Theater, is probably the best filmed Chekhov I've ever seen."
- TV Guide noted "a slow but insightful version of Chekhov... The film is wordy and somewhat claustrophobic in its near-exclusive use of indoor locations. Bondarchuk is not only one of the top post-WW II Russian actors but also a respected director, who directed War and Peace, the eight-and-a-half-hour, $40 million epic version of Tolstoy's novel. This was the first US release for Andrei Konchalovsky, who would go on to work in the US on films such as Runaway Train; Shy People; and Tango and Cash.

== Soundtrack ==
The music of the film was composed by Alfred Schnittke.
