= John Brannen =

John Brannen may refer to:

- John Brannen (basketball) (born 1974), American basketball coach
- John Brannen (singer) (born 1952), American singer
