= K62 =

K62 or K-62 may refer to:

- K-62 (Kansas highway), a state highway in Kansas
- K62-class locomotive
- LG K62, an Android smartphone
- Delaware and Hudson K-62 Class, a steam locomotive
