= Efim Shifrin =

Russian actor

- Efim Shifrin, 2013
- Born: Nakhim Zalmanovich Shifrin; 25 March 1956 (age 70); Neksikan village, Magadan region, Russia, USSR
- Occupations: Actor, director, writer, singer

Efim (Yefim, born Nakhim) Zalmanovich Shifrin (Russian: Ефи́м (Нахи́м) Залма́нович Шифри́н; born March 25, 1956) is a Soviet and Russian actor, humorist, and singer. He is the creator and artistic director of "Shifrin-Theater".

== Biography ==
Efim Shifrin was born in 1956 in the village of Neksikan in the Magadan region. From 1973—1974 he studied at the philological department of Latvian University, and from 1974 to 1978 at the stage department of State University of Circus and Stage Art. One of his professors was Roman Viktyuk.

From 1977, he began to act on stage at Moscow State University. Among Efim’s theatrical works of that time were Goodbye, Boys!, The Night After Being Released and Duck Hunting. In 1979, he became the prize winner of the 1st Moscow Contest of Stage Actors. In 1983, Shifrin became the prize winner of the 7th USSR’s Contest of Stage Actors. His first solo performance, I Would Like to Say, mainly based on works by Viktor Koklyushkin, was in 1985. Koklyushkin's texts also served as the basis of the performances «Three Questions» and «Round Moon».

In 1990, Efim created his own theatrical company, which he has been managing to this day.

The repertoire of the theatre is varied songs. It includes romances by Dmitri Shostakovich with words by Sasha Chorny, the songs "Jerusalem" by Mark Minkov, "The Music in Me" by Mikhail Kochetkov, "Southern Night" by Aleksandr Klevitskiy and others. On stage, he acted in the shows I Do Not Know You Anymore, My Darling, Patched Love, The Prostitutes, The Goat, or Who is Sylvia (director Roman Viktyuk), and Rumors (director Vadim Dubrovitskiy). In 2006, the show The Dragon, based on the play by Evgeny Shvarts (director Vladimir Mirzoev), premiered at the Teatrium in Serpukhovka, where Shifrin played the role of the mayor.

In 2008, two theatrical premieres took place at once: in the role of Erve Montaigne in the show based on Jean Marsan's play (director Valery Sarkisov), and in the role of Gary Essendine in the show based on the play by Noël Coward and directed by Mikhail Kozakov.

Shifrin has acted in the films Bolotnaya Street, The Hero of Our Tribe and 20 other roles. In the musical Angel with a Cigarette Butt, staged by Yevgeniy Ginsburg, he sang 13 songs (music by Aleksandr Klevitsky, words by Yuri Ryashentsev). In 2007, Andrey Konchalovsky's film Gloss premiered, where Shifrin played the role of Marc Shyfer, was held. In addition, the actor played in film magazine.

For several years in March at the Rossiya State Central Concert Hall, Shifrin held benefit performances with participation of stars of Russian stage: «Shifrin Ark», «WWW.SHIFRIN.RU». And in 2006 anniversary benefit performance was arranged.

Shifrin has written the books (in co-authorship with G.Viren) and.

In 2000 he received the award of international network of World Class clubs «Mister Fitness», and in 2006 he was awarded with the Diploma of Physical Training and Sport Committee, Federation of Bodybuilding and Fitness of Government of Moscow for propaganda of sport and healthy way of living. Among the other awards of Shifrin there is Raikin’s Cup (2001) and the 2nd prize and Nikulin’s Cup for participation in TV show of First Channel.

== Bibliography ==
- The River Lethe is Flows («Течет река Лета», 2007 г.)
- The World is a Small Place («Мир тесен», 2004 г.)
- Personal File of Efim Shifrin («Личное дело Ефима Шифрина», Москва, 1997 г.)
- The Theatre Named After Me («Театр имени меня», Москва, «Конец века», 1994 г.)

== Interview ==
- «Getting by on the Russian substitute for vodka»

== Citations about Efim Shifrin ==
From Internet-blog’s:

...to our opinion, none of the writers, who write in Russian now, is so close to Kafka with his flagrant gad – loneliness in the crowd, with his piercing solo of humanity in our technogenic age, marked with innumerable conflicts, as Shifrin. <...> His talent is protean and many-sided. However, the main thing is that Efim Shifrin is the author of four books, unprecedented in their artistry and frankness, appealingness and the special representation of modern world view. <...> Capability to see the frames of existence in crevices of the implacable time run is the peculiar, wonderful gift, immanent to the talent of Shifrin. Books by Shifrin are characterized with trenchant, piercing frankness through the sad smile of philosopher-child. It’s the system of every single moment perceiving of the new and almost physical need to research the ways of Providence and labyrinths of the human soul. «I’ve paid for my «fairy tales» too high price. For them I gave up of my private life and missed the time, when imagination had to give place to the reality» – Andersen once wrote in his diary, but today these words occur to the readers of the Books by Shifrin...
