= Homer and Eddie =

1989 film by Andrei Konchalovsky

- Directed by: Andrei Konchalovsky
- Written by: Patrick Cirillo
- Produced by: Moritz Borman; James Cady
- Starring: Jim Belushi; Whoopi Goldberg; Karen Black; Anne Ramsey; Beah Richards; John Waters
- Cinematography: Lajos Koltai
- Edited by: Henry Richardson
- Music by: Eduard Artemyev
- Production company: Kings Road Entertainment
- Distributed by: Skouras Pictures
- Release dates: August 17, 1989 (West Germany); December 1, 1989 (United States)
- Running time: 100 minutes
- Country: United States
- Language: English

Homer and Eddie is a 1989 American comedy drama film starring Whoopi Goldberg and Jim Belushi and directed by Andrei Konchalovsky.

This was Anne Ramsey's final performance. The film received generally poor reviews from critics.

== Plot ==
Homer, a childlike, intellectually troubled man, decides to drive to Oregon from Arizona to visit his parents. Eddie is a homicidal escapee from a mental institution with an inoperable brain tumor. Eddie crosses paths with Homer, who becomes her traveling companion for a cross-country car trip that brings unexpected meaning to both their lives.

== Cast ==
- Jim Belushi as Homer Lanza
- Whoopi Goldberg as Eddie Cervi
- Karen Black as Belle
- Anne Ramsey as Edna
- Beah Richards as Linda Cervi
- John Waters as Robber
- Mickey Jones as Pizza Chef
- Tad Horino as Mickey
- Vincent Schiavelli as Priest
- Fritz Feld as Mortician (in his last film role)
- Tracey Walter as Tommy Dearly
- Barbara Pilavin as Mrs. Lanza
- Angelo Bertolini as Mr. Lanza
- Nick LaTour as Bar Customer
- Angelyne as Blonde

== Soundtrack ==
Homer and Eddie: Original Motion Picture Soundtrack

Soundtrack album by Various Artists
- Released: 1989
- Genre: Rock
- Length: 38:46
- Label: Virgin

No.	Title	Writer(s)	Performer(s)	Length
1.	"Bad Seeds"	John Brannen, Jack Tempchin	Richie Havens	4:09
2.	"The Wild One"	Brannen, Danny Tate, Tom Gray	John Brannen	4:17
3.	"How Far Can You Go?"	Billy Burnette, David Malloy	Billy Burnette	4:06
4.	"Running with the Storm"	Brannen, Doug Gilmore, Bob Jones	John Brannen	4:23
5.	"Living in the Jungle"	Mike Piccirillo	Richie Havens	4:09
6.	"Night Is the Hunter"	Brannen, Jones, Gray	John Brannen	3:49
7.	"Jesus Scared the Hell Out of Me"	Simon Stokes, Harry Garfield	Simon Stokes	4:09
8.	"Down Home Jubilee"	Dennis Morgan, Susi Beatty, Spady Brannan	Susi Beatty	3:02
9.	"Home"	Piccirillo	Richie Havens	2:23
10.	"Silver Lining"	Eduard Artemyev, Billy Joe Walker	Eduard Artemyev & Billy Joe Walker	4:22
Total length:				38:46

== Reception ==
=== Critical response ===
Homer and Eddie has an approval rating of 0% on review aggregator website Rotten Tomatoes, based on 7 reviews, and an average rating of 2.67/10.

In a negative review, Peter Rainer of the Los Angeles Times wrote, "The subject matter of Homer and Eddie, which has been in the can for over a year, is so close to satire that you regret the decision to play it straight. Particularly since Belushi and Goldberg are more adept at comedy than all this cornball squishiness."
