= Gloss (film) =

- Directed by: Andrei Konchalovsky
- Written by: Andrei Konchalovsky; Dunya Smirnova
- Starring: Julia Vysotskaya; Juris Lauciņš; Efim Shifrin
- Cinematography: Maria Solovyova
- Music by: Eduard Artemyev
- Production company: Andrei Konchalovsky Production Center
- Release date: August 23, 2007
- Running time: 118 minutes
- Country: Russia
- Language: Russian
- Budget: $3 million
- Box office: $4 610 378

Gloss (Russian: Глянец, romanized: Glyanets) is a 2007 Russian satirical melodrama directed by Andrei Konchalovsky. The picture opened the 2007 Kinotavr film festival, and was part of the competition program.

== Plot ==
Galya, a young worker in a provincial factory, dreams of becoming a successful model. One day she leaves her alcoholic parents together with her violent boyfriend and goes to Moscow. She ends up getting hired by a great couturier as a seamstress. During one of their shows, she walks the runway as a model, which causes her to be fired on the spot. Then, seemingly by chance, she becomes the assistant of the owner of a highly exclusive matchmaking agency, which arranges marriages for rich men with the most beautiful models in Moscow. Galya, who only thinks of a career, advances in this world of luxury and money and will do everything to achieve her goals.

== Cast ==
- Julia Vysotskaya — Galya Sokolova
- Juris Lauciņš — Fedor, father of Galya
- Efim Shifrin — Mark Schiffer, fashion designer
- Aleksei Serebryakov — Stasis
- Gennady Smirnov — Petya, the owner of the model agency
- Irina Rozanova — Marina Yurievna, editor of the glossy magazine
- Aleksandr Domogarov — Misha Klimenko
- Olga Arntgolts — Nastya
- Tatyana Arntgolts — Oksana
- Olga Miloyanina — Jeanne
- Alexei Grishin — director
- Artemy Troitsky — thief in the law
- Alexey Kolgan — Volodya
- Fyodor Bondarchuk
- Gosha Kutsenko
- Alexander Ilyin — Mikula
- Sergei Makovetsky
- Andrey Noskov — Gleb
- Yola Sanko — Galya's mother
- Nikolai Fomenko
- Elena Drobysheva
- Yana Poplavskaya
- Ilya Isaev — Viteok
- Elena Perova
- Oleg Komarov
- Vladimir Shiryaev
- Elmira Tuyusheva — Ingeborge
- Yuliya Snigir — model
- Galina Stakhanova — old weaver

== Production ==
The film was shot in Montenegro, Moscow and Rostov.
