= The Nutcracker in 3D =

2010 musical fantasy film by Andrei Konchalovsky

- Theatrical release poster
- Directed by: Andrei Konchalovsky
- Screenplay by: Andrei Konchalovsky; Chris Solimine
- Based on: The Nutcracker by Pyotr Ilyich Tchaikovsky "The Nutcracker and the Mouse King" by E. T. A. Hoffmann (both uncredited)
- Produced by: Andrei Konchalovsky; Paul Lowin
- Starring: Elle Fanning; Nathan Lane; John Turturro; Charlie Rowe; Shirley Henderson; Frances de la Tour; Richard E. Grant; Yulia Vysotskaya; Aaron Michael Drozin
- Cinematography: Mike Southon
- Edited by: Mathieu Bélanger; Andrew Glen
- Music by: Eduard Artemyev; Tim Rice (lyrics)
- Production companies: Vnesheconombank; Noisette Film Productions; HCC Media Group; Russian Roulette Ltd.
- Distributed by: Freestyle Releasing (United States); G2 Pictures (United Kingdom); Central Partnership (Russia); Vertigo Média (Hungary)
- Release dates: 24 November 2010 (Canada/U.S.); 18 December 2010 (Moscow); 7 November 2011 (United Kingdom); 8 December 2011 (Hungary)
- Running time: 108 minutes
- Countries: United Kingdom; Russia; Hungary
- Language: English
- Budget: $90 million
- Box office: $20.5 million

The Nutcracker in 3D (also released as The Nutcracker: The Untold Story) is a 2010 3D Christmas musical fantasy film adapted from Pyotr Ilyich Tchaikovsky's 1892 ballet The Nutcracker. Directed, co-written and produced by Andrei Konchalovsky, the film stars Elle Fanning, Nathan Lane, John Turturro, Frances de la Tour, Richard E. Grant and Yulia Vysotskaya, with Charlie Rowe and Shirley Henderson as the Nutcracker. Set in 1920s Vienna, the plot follows a young girl who receives a magical doll that is revealed to be a prince and embarks on an adventure to save his kingdom from the Rat King.

The film was an international co-production of the United Kingdom, Russia and Hungary. It was released on November 24, 2010 in the United States and Canada, with later releases in Hungary and the United Kingdom. The film was a major critical and commercial failure, becoming one of 41 films to garner a 0% rating on Rotten Tomatoes with over 32 reviews as of October 2025. The film was widely panned for its story, visuals, deviations from the ballet, and the decision to adapt Tchaikovsky's score into lyrical musical numbers. The film also received criticism for its allusions to World War II and the Holocaust, and making the Rats reminiscent of Nazis. It flopped at the box-office, grossing $20 million against a $90 million budget.

== Plot ==
In 1920s Vienna, during the Christmas season, Mary lives with her parents Joseph and Louise, and younger brother Max. While Joseph and Louise attend a party on Christmas Eve, Mary's uncle Albert arrives and gifts both her and Max a dollhouse and "NC," a nutcracker doll whom she takes a liking to. That night, NC comes to life in front of Mary and grows to human height. NC tells her that he must talk to his friends in the dollhouse, which is in the sitting room by the Christmas tree. They go downstairs and Mary finds that the sitting room has grown to such size that they appear to be the height of toys. In the dollhouse, Mary meets NC's friends; Gielgud, a gentlemanly chimpanzee; Tinker, a pernickety opera-singing clown; and Sticks, a Jamaican drummer boy.

After climbing the Christmas tree, Mary meets the Snow Fairy, who resembles her mother. The Snow Fairy says that NC is actually a prince who had his kingdom taken over by the Rat King and his mother, The Rat Queen, who turned him into a nutcracker. She temporarily turns NC back into a boy due to Mary's belief and they dance before finding his city. Since NC was turned into a nutcracker, the Rat King has been oppressing his people, and forcing them to work in factories where the children's toys are burnt to form dark clouds over the city to block out sunlight, which he is afraid of. Mary suggests that they destroy the factories to scare him away. Unbeknownst to them, two of the Rat King's spies tell him that NC is alive and a boy again. The Rat Queen turns NC back into a nutcracker, then sends the Rat Dogs, a pack of robotic Rottweilers, to cut down the Christmas tree. When the tree falls, Mary wakes up in her own bed and runs downstairs to get NC. Her parents do not believe her when she tells them the events of the night.

The next evening, NC comes to life again and intends to round up an army to fight against the Rat King. Max wakes up and agrees to join the fight. NC goes downstairs ahead of the siblings to gather his friends but is kidnapped. When Mary and Max go downstairs, they find that NC, Tinker and Sticks are being held captive in the fireplace by the Rat King and his minions, who kidnap the toys and lure Max back to the city. Mary discovers Gielgud, who evaded capture, and they find a portal to the city in the house's attic, and after stealing disguises from a rat, search for their friends. They find the Rat King and Max in the city centre where toys are being taken from children to be burned. Horrified, Max asks to be returned home, but the Rat King imprisons him in his castle. They sneak into one of the smoke factories where they find Sticks, Tinker and an apparently lifeless NC.

Mary rescues NC from being burned and says that she loves him, which breaks the curse, restoring his life and into being a boy permanently. The factory workers, seeing their prince alive, begin to fight back against the rats while Mary and NC attempt to shut down the factory. The Rat King and Queen board a helicopter, kidnapping Mary and Max. Gielgud and NC take chase and fight the King while Max lands the aircraft in a pile of toys. The King and Queen revert to their original rat forms and flee into the sewers. NC is crowned king and peace is restored in the kingdom as everyone celebrates. The Snow Fairy reappears and says that it is time for Mary to return home, though she is reluctant to leave. Before she departs, NC promises that they will meet again.

Mary wakes in her room, where her parents apologise for their earlier criticisms and promise to spend more time with her. She goes downstairs to Uncle Albert, who introduces her to his new neighbour: a boy her age, who resembles the Nutcracker Prince and asks to be called NC. They become friends and go ice-skating together.

== Cast ==
- Elle Fanning as Mary
- Nathan Lane as Uncle Albert
- John Turturro as the Rat King
- Charlie Rowe as Prince Nicholas Charles "N.C.", the Nutcracker
  - Shirley Henderson as the voice of the Nutcracker
- Frances de la Tour as Frau Eva / The Rat Queen
- Aaron Michael Drozin as Max, Mary's brother
- Richard E. Grant as Joseph, Mary's father
- Yulia Vysotskaya as Louise, Mary's mother / The Snow Fairy
- Jonny Coyne as Gnomad
- Peter Elliott and Daniel Peacock as Gielgud
  - Alan Cox as the voice of Gielgud
- Africa Nile as Sticks
- Hugh Sachs as Tinker
- Stuart Hopps as the Butler / The Rat Queen's servant
- Attila Kalmár as Screech the Bat-Rat
  - Robert Creighton as the voice of Screech
- Ferenc Elek as Lethal the Bat-Rat
  - Jason Harris Katz as the voice of Lethal

== Production ==
=== Development ===
Director Konchalovsky stated that the film had been his "dream project" for over twenty years. He was inspired to adapt it into 3D for several reasons; he believed that the format would be useful in conveying the fantastical nature of the material, capturing the emotions of CGI characters, and appealing to a family audience. At the same time, he opted to adapt it with no ballet sequences because, according to him, "ballet cannot work in cinema very well."

Konchalovsky gave the villainous rats Nazi-like qualities in his production, one of many elements in the adaptation which alienated both critics and audiences.

=== Financing ===
A 2022 article in Meduza reported that the film was primarily financed by VEB.RF, a Russian state development corporation chaired by Vladimir Putin, and that it was the most expensive Russian film produced to date.

In December 2020, VEB filed a lawsuit against the producers for unpaid loans, totaling $127.8 million, claiming they had withheld proceeds from ticket sales.

=== Filming ===
The film was announced at the 2007 Cannes Film Festival and principal photography took place primarily in Budapest, Hungary that summer, before the set was moved to the Stern Film Studio in Pomáz.

=== Music ===
The film's score is derived from Tchaikovsky's original music for The Nutcracker, the ballet version of the E.T.A. Hoffmann story, and lyricist Tim Rice wrote lyrics for it. Many of the songs are based on the ballet's dances. Others are based on Tchaikovsky's other compositions, such as his Symphony No. 5 and Symphony No. 6. Perhaps due to the film's failure, a soundtrack album was never released.

1. "It's All Relative" — Nathan Lane with Elle Fanning and Aaron Michael Drozin
2. "The Song of the Snow Fairy" — Yuliya Vysotskaya
3. "The Rat King's Song" — John Turturro
4. "My Secret World" — Fanning
5. "Story of a Boy" — Lane
6. "Ratification" — Turturro and Chorus
7. "You Gotta Hang Loose and Catch the Show" — Africa Nile and Hugh Sachs
8. "Life Begins Again" — Charlie Rowe and Chorus

== Release ==
The film was first screened at the European Film Market on 5 February 2009. The film was released in the United States and Canada on 24 November 2010 by Freestyle Releasing and Alliance Films respectively, the United Kingdom on 7 November 2012 by G2 Pictures, and in Hungary on 8 December 2012 by Vertigo Média.

Universal Pictures Home Entertainment later released the film on DVD and Blu-ray in the United States, the Netherlands and Sweden in 2011.

=== Box office ===
The film brought in a total of $20,466,016 worldwide (over half of which came from Russia), with a loss of $73,821,041.

=== Critical response ===
The Nutcracker in 3D was universally panned by critics. On the review aggregator website Rotten Tomatoes, 0% of 32 critics' reviews are positive, with an average rating of 3.0/10. Metacritic, which uses a weighted average, assigned the film a score of 18 out of 100, based on 18 critics, indicating "overwhelming dislike". Metacritic later ranked it the "Worst Limited Release" film of 2010.

Roger Ebert of the Chicago Sun-Times gave it one out of four stars and asked, "From what dark night of the soul emerged the wretched idea for The Nutcracker in 3D?". Ebert went on to claim it as "One of those rare holiday movies that may send children screaming under their seats." Claudia Puig of USA Today accused the film of being "contrived, convoluted, amateurish and tedious," and panned it for lacking any trace of ballet, unlike several previous versions of The Nutcracker. Frank Scheck of The Hollywood Reporter wrote, "With the chief villain and his goose-stepping minions bearing no small resemblance to Nazis, the ensuing plot developments are uncomfortable to the extreme. One can imagine the unease of parents escorting their tykes to what they imagine to be a holiday treat, only to find them exposed to images- including the burning of toys into ashes- that are often arresting but seemingly straight out of Schindler's List."

Entertainment Weekly reviewer Lisa Schwarzbaum gave it its only positive review from a professional film critic, albeit with the acknowledgment that the film fit more into the "so-bad-it's-good" category than that of a quality movie. She awarded it a B+ and remarked "Attention, university film clubs: Here's your cult-ready midnight-movie programming."

=== Accolades ===
Award	Category	Recipients	Result
Metacritic's Best and Worst Films of 2010	Worst Limited Release Film of 2010	The Nutcracker in 3D	Won
31st Golden Raspberry Awards	Worst Eye Gouging Misuse of 3D	The Nutcracker in 3D	Nominated
Young Artist Awards 2011	Best Young Actress	Elle Fanning	Nominated

== See also ==
- List of biggest box-office bombs
- The Nutcracker
