= Khroniki russkoy revolyutsii =

- Genre: historical drama
- Written by: Andrei Konchalovsky; Elena Kiselyova
- Directed by: Andrei Konchalovsky
- Starring: Julia Vysotskaya; Yura Borisov; Nikita Karatayev; Evgeniy Tkachuk; Timofey Okroyev; Nikita Efremov; Alexander Mizev
- No. of seasons: 1
- No. of episodes: 16

Production
- Cinematography: Andrei Naydyonov

Original release
- Network: Start; Russia-1
- Release: 10 October 2025

Khroniki russkoy revolyutsii (Хроники русской революции) is a 2025 Russian historical drama television series directed by Andrei Konchalovsky. It stars Julia Vysotskaya and Yura Borisov.

== Plot ==
The Left Socialist Revolutionaries seized power in Russia. As a result of the armed uprising, a government was established by the Second All-Russian Congress of Soviets. The Bolsheviks and their allies constituted the majority of the delegates, while internationalists and anarchists constituted a minority...

== Cast ==
- Julia Vysotskaya as Ariadna Alexandrovna Slavina
- Yura Borisov as Mikhail Vasilyevich Prokhorov
- Nikita Karatayev as Aleksey Tikhomirov
- Evgeniy Tkachuk as Vladimir Lenin
- Timofey Okroyev as Joseph Stalin
- Nikita Efremov as Nicholas II
- Alexander Mizev as Luther

== Production ==
Filming took place in the Moscow and Saint Petersburg.
