= Shy People =

1987 film by Andrei Konchalovsky

- Directed by: Andrei Konchalovsky
- Written by: Andrei Konchalovsky; Gérard Brach; Marjorie David
- Produced by: Yoram Globus; Menahem Golan
- Starring: Barbara Hershey; Jill Clayburgh; Martha Plimpton
- Cinematography: Chris Menges
- Edited by: Alain Jakubowicz
- Music by: Tangerine Dream
- Production companies: The Cannon Group; Golan-Globus
- Distributed by: Cannon Film Distributors
- Release dates: May 14, 1987 (Cannes); March 11, 1988 (United States)
- Running time: 118 minutes
- Country: United States
- Language: English
- Box office: $769,119

Shy People is a 1987 American drama film directed by Andrei Konchalovsky, from a script by Konchalovsky, Marjorie David and Gérard Brach. It stars Barbara Hershey, Jill Clayburgh, and Martha Plimpton, and features music by the German electronic music group Tangerine Dream. The film is about the culture clash that takes place between Diana, a Manhattan writer, her wayward teenage daughter Grace, and their long-distant relatives in the bayous of Louisiana.

It premiered at the 40th Cannes Film Festival on May 14, 1987, with Hershey winning the award for Best Actress. It received a limited release in the United States on March 11, 1988. It was one of the last film roles for actor Merritt Butrick, who died from AIDS in 1989. It was filmed by the bayous of South Louisiana.

== Plot summary ==
Diana Sullivan is a successful Manhattan writer and photojournalist, seemingly oblivious to the serious cocaine addiction that her wild child daughter, Grace, has developed. Diana is given a commission by Cosmopolitan magazine to write an article about a distant branch of her family that lives in the bayous of Louisiana. She takes a reluctant Grace along with her.

In Louisiana, they encounter Diana's cousin, Ruth. Married at 12 to an abusive man whose current whereabouts are an increasingly troubling cipher, the domineering Ruth rules over her three adult sons. The sons—Pauly, Tommy, and Mark—are less than perfectly cogent, with equal parts protectiveness and ferocity, while a fourth, disowned son adds to the volatility of the situation. As the fascinated Diana and wary Ruth circle one another, Grace, bored and in the grips of her addiction, toys with her naive cousins with devastating consequences.

== Cast ==
- Jill Clayburgh as Diana Sullivan
- Barbara Hershey as Ruth
- Martha Plimpton as Grace Sullivan
- Merritt Butrick as Mike
- John Philbin as Tommy
- Don Swayze as Mark
- Pruitt Taylor Vince as Pauly
- Mare Winningham as Candy

== Production ==
Andrei Konchalovsky said he wanted to examine the clash of a "civilized" culture with a more "rural" culture. He conceived of the story while filming the 1979 Russian epic Siberiade. The screenplay was written by Konchalovsky with Gérard Brach and Marjorie David, who had all previously collaborated together on the script for Maria's Lovers.

Principal photography took place from September 22 to December 20 of 1986. Much of the film was shot in Cajun Country in Lafayette, Louisiana. Bayou scenes were filmed in Henderson Basin and the Atchafalaya Swamp. Ruth's house was a set constructed beside a swamp in Catahoula. Scenes at Mike’s nightclub were filmed in Los Angeles.

== Soundtrack ==
Shy People
- 1988 LP album cover

Soundtrack album by Tangerine Dream
- Released: 1988
- Recorded: 1987
- Genre: Electronic
- Length: 36:06
- Label: Varèse Sarabande
- Producer: Tangerine Dream

Tangerine Dream chronology
Near Dark (1988)	Shy People (1988)	Livemiles (1988)

Shy People is the thirty-third major release and eleventh soundtrack album by Tangerine Dream. It is the soundtrack to the 1988 movie of the same name.

=== Track listing ===
All tracks are written by Edgar Froese, Chris Franke and Paul Haslinger.

No.	Title	Length
1.	"Shy People" (vocal version)	7:50
2.	"Joe's Place"	2:10
3.	"The Harbor"	4:00
4.	"Nightfall"	4:00
5.	"Dancing on a White Moon"	3:03
6.	"Civilized Illusions"	3:50
7.	"Swamp Voices"	3:13
8.	"Transparent Days"	3:00
9.	"Shy People" (Instrumental version)	5:00
Total length:		36:06

=== Personnel ===
- Edgar Froese
- Chris Franke
- Paul Haslinger
- Jacquie Virgil — vocals on "Shy People" and "Dancing On A White Moon"
- Diamond Ross — vocals on "The Harbor"

The movie's actual sound track uses different versions of "Shy People" and "The Harbor" with different sets of lyrics, sung by Michael Bishop.

== Release ==
The film premiered at the 1987 Cannes Film Festival to acclaim, with Barbara Hershey winning the award for Best Actress. The film was given a one-week screening in Los Angeles on December 4, 1987 in order to qualify for that year's Oscars awards, but failed to garner any nominations.

A wider distribution plan was botched in part due to miscommunication between branches of The Cannon Group, who were undergoing financial troubles. Cannon head Menahem Golan had been personally negotiating with Cineplex Odeon head Garth Drabinsky to distribute Shy People due to his successful track record with art films. However, Cannon Releasing, the distribution arm of Cannon, was unaware of Golan's talks with Drabinsky and went ahead with a deal that booked the film into 300 theaters. When Drabinsky got word of the deal, he pulled out of distribution talks and the film did not get a proper theatrical release with Cineplex Odeon.

Shy People opened on 246 screens in North America on March 11, 1988.

Konchalovsky criticized Cannon over the situation, saying, "None of my [Cannon] films has been released properly. Cannon can't get the right theaters. They have made a lot of strategic mistakes." Shy People was the last film Konchalovsky would direct for the company.

== Reception ==
=== Critical response ===
Roger Ebert gave the film four out of four stars. He wrote Shy People "is one of the great visionary films of recent years, a film that shakes off the petty distractions of safe Hollywood entertainments and develops a large vision. It is about revenge and hatred, about mothers and sons, about loneliness. It suggests that family ties are the most important bonds in the world. And by the end of the film, Clayburgh will discover that Hershey is closer to her husband, who has been missing for 15 years, than most city dwellers are to anybody." Ebert lamented the film's distribution and wrote that if it had been better handled by Cannon, Shy People could have been a contender for an Academy Award for Best Picture.

Vincent Canby of The New York Times was more critical. He said that the film "contains more than its fair share of howlers", that its themes of culture clashes and value differences "are too obvious to be especially interesting to Americans", and that "Mr. Konchalovsky's direction is as self-conscious as the screenplay".

The score by Tangerine Dream and cinematography by Chris Menges also received praise.

On review aggregator website Rotten Tomatoes, Shy People has an approval rating of 64% based on 11 reviews, and an average rating of 6.18/10.

=== Awards and nominations ===
- 1987 Cannes Film Festival
  - Best Actress - Barbara Hershey
  - Golden Palm (nominee)
- 1988 Independent Spirit Awards
  - Best Supporting Actress - Martha Plimpton (nominee)
