= Juris Lauciņš =

Latvian-Russian actor

- Born: 25 May 1957; Daugavpils, Latvian SSR, Soviet Union (now Latvia)
- Died: 23 December 2013 (aged 56); Moscow, Russia
- Education: Boris Shchukin Theatre Institute
- Occupation: Actor
- Years active: 1967–2013

Juris Lauciņš (Russian: Юрис Лауциньш; 25 May 1957 – 23 December 2013) was a Latvian-Russian actor, whose career spanned over 45 years.

Born in Daugavpils, Latvian SSR, Soviet Union (now Latvia), Lauciņš began his acting career at age ten in 1967 and appeared in film, television and stage roles, before beginning his career in Russia SFSR and eventually Russia.

Juris Lauciņš died from throat cancer on 23 December 2013, aged 56, in Moscow, Russia.

== Selected filmography ==
- Gloss (2007)
- Yuri's Day (2008)
