= Paradise (2016 film) =

2016 film

- Film poster
- Directed by: Andrei Konchalovsky
- Written by: Elena Kiseleva; Andrei Konchalovsky
- Produced by: Andrei Konchalovsky, Alisher Usmanov
- Starring: Yuliya Vysotskaya
- Cinematography: Aleksandr Simonov
- Edited by: Ekaterina Vesheva
- Music by: Sergey Shustitsky
- Release date: 8 September 2016 (Venice)
- Running time: 130 minutes
- Country: Russia
- Languages: Russian; German; French

Paradise (Russian: Рай; Ray) is a 2016 Russian drama film produced and directed by Andrei Konchalovsky. It was selected to compete for the Golden Lion at the 73rd Venice International Film Festival. At Venice Konchalovsky won the Silver Lion for Best Director. It was selected as the Russian entry for the Best Foreign Language Film at the 89th Academy Awards. In December 2016, it made the shortlist of nine films to be considered for a nomination at the 89th Academy Awards.

== Plot ==
The film is built around the intertwining destinies of three main characters during the Second World War: aristocratic Russian émigré and member of the French Resistance Olga (Yuliya Vysotskaya), Jules (Philippe Duquesne) an administrator in the French police department and a French collaborator, and a high-ranking SS officer Helmut (Christian Clauß).

Olga is arrested for hiding Jewish children from the Nazi roundups. Her case is overseen by Jules. He is interested in her and accepts her offer of sex in exchange for the release of a Russian prisoner she knows, but Jules is murdered by the French resistance before this occurs. Olga lands in a German concentration camp. There she meets Helmut, who in the past was hopelessly in love with her. Strange and painful relations commence between them.

The Nazis are already close to defeat, and Helmut decides to save Olga from the camp and run away with her to South America. Olga, having lost hope of freedom agrees, but at the last moment realizes that her idea of paradise has changed.

== Cast ==
- Yuliya Vysotskaya as Olga
- Christian Clauß as Helmut
- Philippe Duquesne as Jules
- Peter Kurth as Krause
- Jakob Diehl as Vogel
- Viktor Sukhorukov as Heinrich Himmler
- Vera Voronkova as Rosa

== Reception ==
=== Critical response ===
Paradise has an approval rating of 70% on review aggregator website Rotten Tomatoes, based on 23 reviews, and an average rating of 7.5/10. The website's critical consensus states, "Paradise hits hard and lingers, although viewers who've seen a number of other Holocaust-set dramas may find it all a bit familiar". It also has a score of 52 out of 100 on Metacritic, based on 7 critics, indicating "mixed or average reviews".

=== Accolades ===
Awards
Award	Date of ceremony	Category	Recipients and nominees	Result
2016 Golden Eagle Awards	2016	Best Film	Andrei Konchalovsky, Alisher Usmanov	Won
2016 Golden Eagle Awards	2016	Best director	Andrei Konchalovsky	Won
2016 Golden Eagle Awards	2016	Best Actress	Julia Vysotskaya	Won
Venice Film Festival	10 September 2016	Silver Lion for Best Director	Andrei Konchalovsky	Won
Venice Film Festival	10 September 2016	Golden Lion	Andrei Konchalovsky	Nominated
Mar del Plata International Film Festival	27 November 2016	Golden Ástor	Andrei Konchalovsky	Nominated
Mar del Plata International Film Festival	27 November 2016	Best Screenplay	Andrei Konchalovsky and Elena Kiseleva	Won
2017 Nika Awards	28 March 2017	Best Film	Andrei Konchalovsky, Alisher Usmanov	Won
2017 Nika Awards	28 March 2017	Best Director	Andrei Konchalovsky	Won
2017 Nika Awards	28 March 2017	Best Actress	Julia Vysotskaya	Won
2017 Filmfest München	2017	Special prize	Andrei Konchalovsky	Won
2017 Filmfest München	2017	Best Actress	Julia Vysotskaya	Won
2016 Chicago International Film Festival	2016	Founder's Award	Andrei Konchalovsky	Won
2016 Chicago International Film Festival	2016	Gold Hugo	Andrei Konchalovsky	Nominated
2016 Satellite Awards	2016	Best Foreign Language Film	Andrei Konchalovsky	Nominated

== See also ==
- List of submissions to the 89th Academy Awards for Best Foreign Language Film
- List of Russian submissions for the Academy Award for Best Foreign Language Film
