= Orso Maria Guerrini =

Italian actor and voice actor

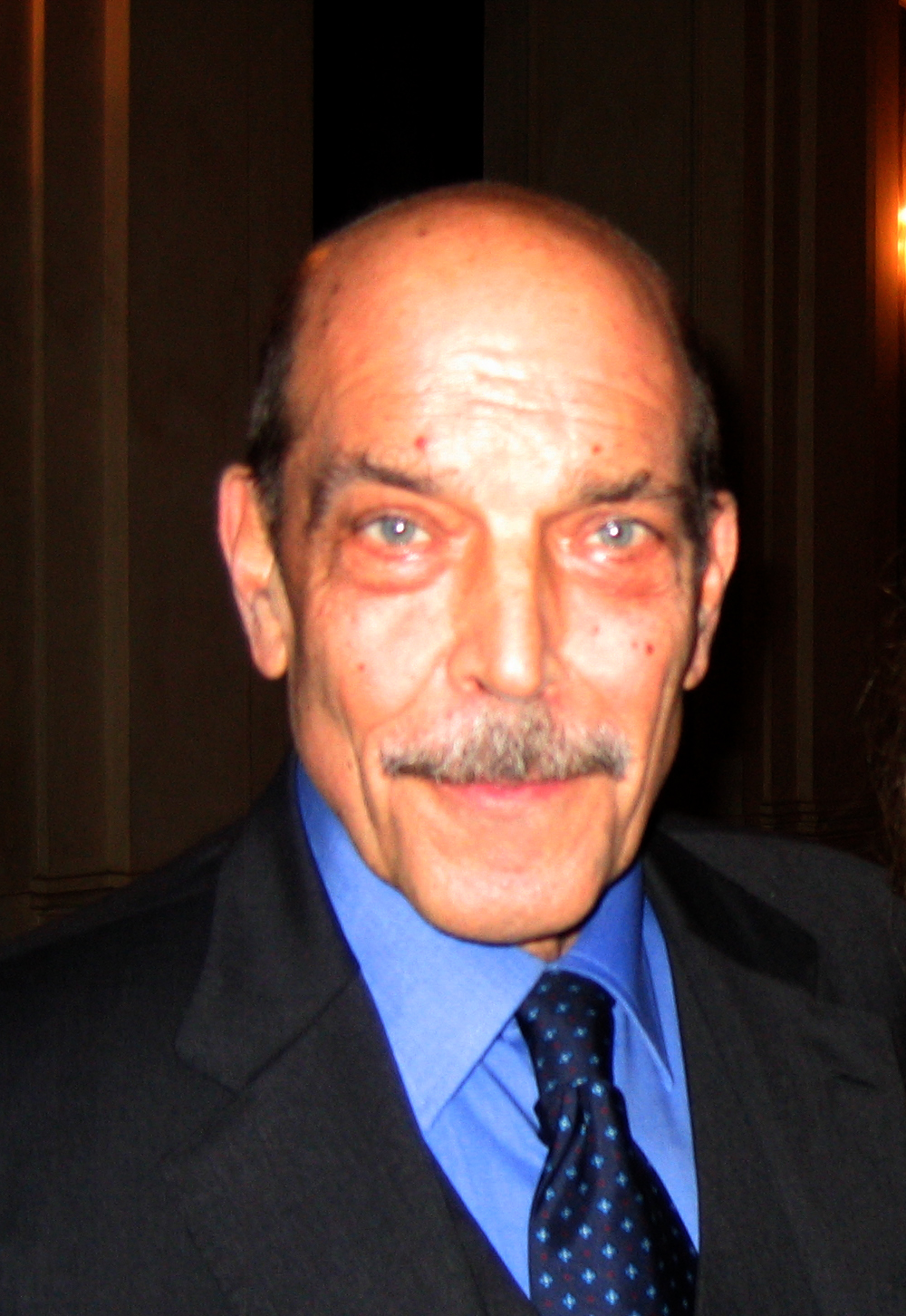
- Guerrini in 2009
- Born: 25 October 1943 (age 82); Florence, Italy
- Occupation: Actor

Orso Maria Guerrini (born 25 October 1942) is an Italian film, television and stage actor and voice actor.

== Life and career ==
Born in Florence, Guerrini started his career with several small roles in Spaghetti Westerns and genre films. He became first known in 1970 when he was chosen to play the main character in Anton Giulio Majano's E le stelle stanno a guardare. He then starred in dozens of films for cinema and television, as well as being active as a voice actor.

He is also a well known as spokesman for Birra Moretti.

== Selected filmography ==
- My Name Is Pecos (1966) – Clane Henchman (uncredited)
- Run, Man, Run (1968) – Raul
- Bandits in Rome (1968) – Lo Cascio
- The Tough and the Mighty (1969)
- Eat It (1969)
- Lonely Hearts (1970)
- Situation Normal: A.F.U (1970)
- The Conformist (1970)
- A Man Called Sledge (1970)
- Waterloo (1970) – Officer
- The Assassin of Rome (1972) – Gianni Di Meo
- Il bacio di una morta (1974) – Conte Guido Rambaldi di Lampedusa
- Laure (1976) – Professor Gualtier Morgan
- Space: 1999 – Episode : The Testament of Arkadia (1976, TV) – Luke Ferro
- Rome Armed to the Teeth (1976) – Ferrender (uncredited)
- The Big Racket (1976) – Rossetti
- A Matter of Time (1976) – Gabriele d'Orazio
- Keoma (1976) – Butch Shannon
- Agonas horis telos (1978)
- Desideria: La vita interiore (1980) – Quinto
- La gatta da pelare (1981) – Prof. Maraldi
- Forest of Love (1981)
- 18 anni tra una settimana (1991) – Ortensi
- L'Atlantide (1992) – Ben Cheikh
- First Action Hero (1994) – Tony Romeo
- Vendetta (1995) – Giuseppe Cortini
- Slave of Dreams (1995, TV Movie) – The Pharaoh
- Memsaab (1996)
- L'ombre du pharaon (1996)
- Double Team (1997) – Colony Resident
- Desert of Fire (1997, TV Mini-Series) – Al Khan
- The Eighteenth Angel (1997) – Paolo Pagano
- Annarè (1998) – L'esattore
- Alex l'ariete (2000) – Barra
- Un giudice di rispetto (2000) – Don Carmine Di Cristina
- Lo strano caso del signor Kappa (2001) – Senatore Versini
- The Bourne Identity (2002) – Giancarlo
- Amanti e Segreti (2004, TV Mini-Series) – Benedetto Ungari
- Countdown (2004) – Italian Prime Minister
- Il soffio dell'anima (2009) – Luna's Father
- Trappola d'autore (2009) – Omar Dimitri
- La meravigliosa avventura di Antonio Franconi (2011)
- Lacrime di San Lorenzo (2015) – Senator Verini
- Tiramisù (2016) – Boss
- Il crimine non va in pensione (2017) – Alfio il Generale
- Sin (2019) – Marchese Malaspina
- Flowing (2022) – Mr. Ferrini
