= Dear Comrades! =

2020 film

- Film poster
- Дорогие товарищи!
- Directed by: Andrei Konchalovsky
- Screenplay by: Andrei Konchalovsky; Elena Kiseleva
- Produced by: Andrei Konchalovsky; Olesya Gidrat; Alisher Usmanov
- Starring: Julia Vysotskaya; Sergei Erlish; Yuliya Burova; Vladislav Komarov; Andrey Gusev
- Cinematography: Andrey Naydenov
- Edited by: Sergei Taraskin; Karolina Maciejewska
- Production company: Andrei Konchalovsky Studios
- Distributed by: Walt Disney Studios Motion Pictures (Russia)
- Release date: 7 September 2020 (Venice)
- Running time: 121 minutes
- Country: Russia
- Language: Russian

Dear Comrades! (Russian: Дорогие товарищи!, romanized: Dorogie tovarishchi!) is a 2020 Russian historical drama film about the Novocherkassk massacre produced, co-written and directed by Andrei Konchalovsky. It was entered in competition at the 77th Venice International Film Festival. At Venice, the film won the Special Jury Prize. The film received a nomination for BAFTA Award for Best Film Not in the English Language and was selected as the Russian entry for the Best International Feature Film at the 93rd Academy Awards, making the shortlist of fifteen films.

== Plot ==
The film depicts the shooting of a demonstration of workers in Novocherkassk in 1962. Lyudmila is a party worker of the local city committee, and a staunch communist. During a large workers' strike at the Novocherkassk Electric Locomotive Plant over rising food prices and cuts in wages, Lyudmila witnesses the mass shooting of demonstrators by order of the Government Commission, which is trying to hide the strike from the rest of the USSR.

During the protest and massacre, Lyudmila's 18-year-old daughter Svetka disappears. Lyudmila searches for her daughter frantically, but discreetly, as the KGB begins arresting suspects, secretly burying bodies, locking the town down completely, and legally swearing every person in town to total silence about the events. Lyudmila struggles to understand how the government could do all this while simultaneously trying to convince herself that communism will triumph in the end. She longs for the days when Joseph Stalin ruled, but also prays and begs God to let her daughter still be alive.

A sympathetic KGB agent surreptitiously tries to help her locate her daughter. They eventually make their way out of the town to check a rural cemetery where some of the bodies have been secretly buried. A policeman who was ordered to bury the bodies in decrepit graves confirms that he buried the girl in the picture Lyudmila shows him of her daughter Svetka. She becomes grief-stricken when he mentions the girl's toes were sticking out of a hole in one stocking - a hole Lyudmila had recently told her daughter to sew up.

She drinks heavily on the way back to town. She is overcome with grief and confusion about all that has happened and what it means for communism and for her life. When she gets back to her apartment at night, her own father is packing up Svetka's suitcase. He tells Lyudmila that Svetka is up on the roof.

Lyudmila races up the stairs, and through a window sees her daughter hiding on the roof. She is overcome with joy and shock and repeats God's name in wonder that her daughter is alive. As she hugs Svetka, she promises that she will protect her from the KGB. As the film ends, Lyudmila embraces her daughter and repeats the words, "We'll do better."

== Cast ==
- Julia Vysotskaya as Lyudmila 'Lyuda' Syomina
- Sergei Erlish as Lyuda's father
- Yuliya Burova as Svetka, Lyuda's daughter
- Vladislav Komarov as Loginov
- Andrey Gusev as Viktor

== Reception ==
On the review aggregator website Rotten Tomatoes, 93% of 59 critics' reviews are positive, with an average rating of 8.1/10. The website's consensus reads: "Dear Comrades takes a sharp, commanding look at a dark chapter in Soviet history made even more effective by its director's cold fury." According to Metacritic, which sampled 19 critics and calculated a weighted average score of 82 out of 100, the film received "universal acclaim".

Mark Kermode of The Observer gave the film 4/5 stars, writing, "Seamlessly blending exterior shots of Novocherkassk with grand sets constructed in Moscow, Konchalovsky creates an utterly convincing air of mounting chaos, brilliantly captured on multiple cameras marshalled by cinematographer Andrey Naydenov." The Washington Post's Ann Hornaday gave it 4/4 stars, saying that it "may not make perfect sense of the past, but it goes a long way in allowing people to look at it with a clarity that manages to be exacting and compassionate at the same time."

== See also ==
- List of submissions to the 93rd Academy Awards for Best International Feature Film
- List of Russian submissions for the Academy Award for Best International Feature Film
