= Let's Eat at Home! =

- Created by: Julia Vysotskaya
- Country of origin: Russia
- Original language: Russian
- No. of seasons: 8

Production
- Running time: 25-30 minutes

Original release
- Network: NTV Sunday, 9:25am (GMT+3); STB Saturday 9:00am (GMT+3)

Let's Eat at Home (Russian: Едим дома!, romanized: Edim doma!) is a cooking show hosted by Julia Vysotskaya. The series has been airing live on NTV and STB television channels since 2003.

== Breakfast with Julia Vysotskaya ==
A spinoff titled Breakfast with Julia Vysotskaya aired on NTV channel from 2009 until 2016.

== edimdoma.ru ==
In order to make it easier for people to share recipes, Julia developed the cooking social network edimdoma.ru in 2009.

== The "Let's Eat at Home" book ==
Julia Vysotskaya's first book of "Let's Eat at Home" recipes came out in December, 2005.

1. 2006 — "Let's Eat at Home. Recipes by Julia Vysotskaya"
2. 2007 — "Let's Eat at Home all Year Round"
3. 2007 — "Gloss"
4. 2008 — "Let's Eat at Home Every Day"
5. 2008 — "Tasty Notes"
6. 2009 — "I Eat, I Run, I Live"
7. 2010 — "Cooking for Kids of All Ages"
8. 2010 — "New Year Recipes"
9. 2011 — "One, Two and Ready"

== "Let's Eat at Home!" DVD ==
1. 2007 - "Let's Eat at Home!"
2. 2009 – "The Party Starts in the Kitchen"
3. 2009 – "Picnics"
4. 2009 – "Happy New Year's!"
