= The Postman's White Nights =

2014 film

- Film poster
- Directed by: Andrei Konchalovsky
- Written by: Andrei Konchalovsky; Elena Kiseleva
- Starring: Aleksey Tryapitsyn
- Cinematography: Aleksandr Simonov
- Music by: Eduard Artemyev
- Release dates: 5 September 2014 (Venice); 19 October 2014 (Russia)
- Running time: 90 minutes
- Country: Russia
- Language: Russian
- Budget: $1.5 million

The Postman's White Nights (Russian: Белые ночи почтальона Алексея Тряпицына; Belye nochi pochtalona Alekseya Tryapitsyna) is a 2014 Russian drama film directed by Andrei Konchalovsky. The film tells the story of the people of a remote Russian village, whose main contact with the outside world is a postman. All actors in the film are non-professionals, with casting taking place over the course of a year.

It was selected for the In Competition section at the 71st Venice International Film Festival and won the Silver Lion. The film received generally positive reviews from critics. In September 2014, director Konchalovsky withdrew the film from the list of films being considered for the Russian entry for the Academy Award for Best Foreign Language Film. The film was shot on location at the Kenozersky National Park, Arkhangelsk Oblast, Russia.

== Plot ==
In remote Russian villages scattered across the countryside, people often live on the fringes of society, nearly cut off from government influence and largely left to fend for themselves. In such isolated communities, the village postman becomes a critical link between the few remaining residents and the outside world. This film follows one such postman, Aleksey Tryapitsyn, whose only means of reaching the mainland from his secluded village is by crossing a lake by boat. With just a handful of residents in the village, everyone knows one another, living as their ancestors did for generations. Tryapitsyn serves as their sole connection to modern civilization. When the woman he loves decides to leave for the city to start a new life, and his boat motor is stolen, leaving him unable to deliver mail, he grapples with a choice and ultimately decides to leave as well. However, he soon returns, unable to fully explain why.

== Cast ==
- Aleksey Tryapitsyn as Postman
- Timur Bondarenko as Timur, Irina's son
- Irina Ermolova as Irina

== Reception ==
As of 20 September 2020, The Postman's White Nights has an approval rating of 89% on the review aggregator website Rotten Tomatoes, based on 9 reviews, and an average rating of 8.0/10. The film also has a score of 83% on Metacritic, based on 4 reviews, indicating "universal acclaim".

Cine Vue gave the film four stars. The film was reviewed by Variety magazine, which stated that while the likable protagonists and some stunning shots are notable, they do not compensate for its weak spots.

- The Hollywood Reporter:

"The setting itself is gorgeous, with its boxy cottages fringed by grassy clearings and woodlands, and the placid surface of the water stretching on for miles. It's a rare pleasure to see a film made with such an elegant compositional eye […] Deep-focus shots of Lyokha at his most pensive, standing on the shores of the lake, are loaded with a sense of place, and of belonging. The same goes for the hypnotic Steadycam sequences of him zooming along in his boat, the sound of the motor quietly giving way to a slow build of electronica composer Eduard Artemyev's stirring ambient score with choral elements."

- Indiewire.com:

"'The Postman's White Nights' is being widely celebrated as a quasi-documentary, marked by a droll sense of humor that illuminates life in a forgotten corner of the world. And it is that, no doubt, but for us it went much further than mere anthropological interest. If it presents an accurate picture of this reality, then it feels like it's a reality that is unstable, so far cut off from the mainstream of life that it has begun to fray into the surreal and the magic at the edges."
