= Reading Blue Mountain and Northern 2102 =

Preserved American 4-8-4 steam locomotive (RDG class T-1)

Reading and Northern 2102
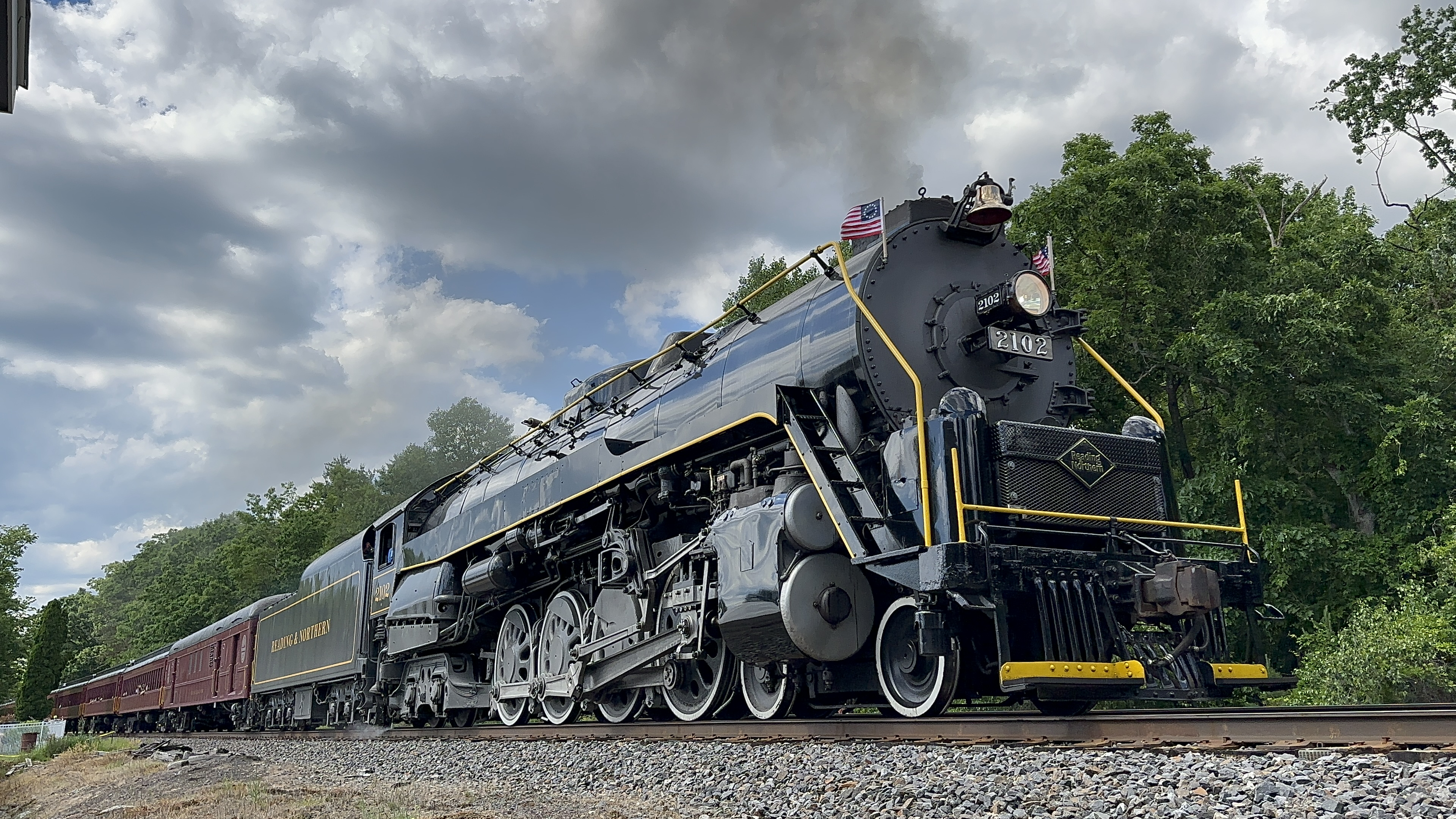
- RBMN No. 2102 rolls through Kirby Avenue in Mountain Top, Pennsylvania, June 13, 2026.
Type and origin
- Power type: Steam
- Builder: Baldwin Locomotive Works
- Serial number: 58329
- Build date: March 1925 (as Class I-10sa 2-8-0 Consolidation No. 2044)
- Rebuilder: Reading Company
- Rebuild date: September 1945 (Rebuilt as: T1 4-8-4 Northern No. 2102)
Specifications
- Configuration
  - Whyte: New: 2-8-0; Rebuilt: 4-8-4
  - UIC: New: 1'D; Rebuilt: 2'D'2
- Gauge: 4 ft 8 1/2 in (1,435 mm) standard gauge
- Leading dia.: 36 in (914 mm)
- Driver dia.: 70 in (1,778 mm)
- Trailing dia.: 44 in (1,118 mm)
- Length: 110 ft 6 in (33.68 m)
- Height: 15 ft 2 in (4.62 m)
- Axle load: 69,550 lb (34.78 short tons)
- Adhesive weight: 278,200 lb (139.1 short tons)
- Loco weight: 441,300 lb (220.7 short tons)
- Tender weight: 367,700 lb (183.9 short tons)
- Total weight: 809,000 lb (404 short tons)
- Fuel type: Anthracite / Bituminous coal mix
- Fuel capacity: 19 short tons (38,000 pounds)
- Water cap.: 19,000 US gallons (72,000 L; 16,000 imp gal)
- Firebox
  - Grate area: 94.5 sq ft (8.78 m^{2})
- Boiler: 96 in (2,438 mm)
- Boiler pressure: 240 lbf/in^{2} (1.65 MPa)
- Cylinders: Two, outside
- Cylinder size: 27 in × 32 in (686 mm × 813 mm)
- Valve gear: Walschaerts
- Valve type: Piston valves
- Loco brake: Air
- Train brakes: Air
- Couplers: Knuckle
Performance figures
- Maximum speed: 80 mph (130 km/h)
- Power output: 5,500 hp (4,100 kW)
- Tractive effort: Loco: 68,000 lbf (302.5 kN); Booster: 11,100 lbf (49.4 kN); Total: 79,100 lbf (351.9 kN)
- Factor of adh.: Loco: 4.09; Booster: 4.33
Career
- Operators: Reading Company; Steam Tours Inc.; Allegheny Group; Rail Diversified; Reading Blue Mountain and Northern Railroad
- Class: New: I-10sa; Rebuilt: T-1
- Numbers: RDG 2044; RDG 2102; D&H 302; Allegheny 2102; RBM&NR 2102; R&N 2102
- Retired: 1956 (revenue service); October 27, 1991 (1st excursion service)
- Restored: April 29, 1962 (1st restoration); April 5, 2022 (2nd restoration)
- Current owner: Reading Blue Mountain and Northern Railroad
- Disposition: Operational

Reading Blue Mountain and Northern 2102 (historically known as Reading 2102) is a preserved T-1 class 4-8-4 "Northern" type steam locomotive, originally built by the Baldwin Locomotive Works (BLW) in March 1925 as an I-10sa class 2-8-0 "Consolidation" type locomotive for the Reading Company (RDG). No. 2102 was rebuilt by RDG's own locomotive shops as a 4-8-4 in September 1945, and it was used for pulling heavy coal trains for the RDG until being retired from revenue service in 1956.

Between 1962 and 1964, No. 2102 was used to haul the Iron Horse Rambles excursion trains. After the Rambles ended in 1964, No. 2102 was sold to Steam Tours of Akron, Ohio, and it spent the next several years pulling various fan trips in the Northeast, Mid-Atlantic and Midwest. In 1985, it was sold again to Andy Muller to operate on his Reading Blue Mountain and Northern Railroad (RBMN) alongside 4-6-2 No. 425, until its flue time expired, on October 27, 1991.

In February 2016, the locomotive began to be restored back to operating condition, and then it returned to service, in April 2022, pulling RBMN's excursions between Reading and Jim Thorpe, Pennsylvania. Since the summer of 2024, No. 2102 pulled excursions through the Lehigh River Gorge from Nesquehoning to Tunkhannock, Pennsylvania in June and Pittston, Pennsylvania in August.

== History ==
=== Revenue service ===
By the end of the 1920s, the Philadelphia and Reading Company had approximately 1,015 class "I" 2-8-0 "Consolidation" types constructed by the Baldwin Locomotive Works (BLW) in Philadelphia, Pennsylvania, as well as the Reading's own locomotive shops in Reading. One of those classes of 2-8-0s was the I-10sa class, and No. 2102 was one of the last I-10sa locomotives built in 1925, being numbered 2044 at the time. No. 2044 was solely used for heavy freight service on the Reading's Branch lines, and sometimes, on the main line. When the Reading needed more heavier and powerful locomotives during the end of World War II, they brought thirty of their Consolidations Nos 2020–2049, including No. 2044, into its locomotive shops in Reading. There, No. 2044 was heavily rebuilt into a 4-8-4 "Northern", and was reclassified as a T-1, being renumbered to 2102. Its four-axle tender was replaced with a larger six-axle tender, its boiler was extended, its driving wheel diameter was increased, it received two extra pilot wheels, and it received four trailing wheels to support its enlarged firebox. No. 2102 was reassigned for mainline freight service only, just as the rest of its rebuilt sister locomotives were.

As the Reading discontinued steam operations in 1956, No. 2102 was retired from revenue service, and shortly afterward, it was sold to Carpenter Steel Corporation to provide steam for its plant.

=== First excursion service ===
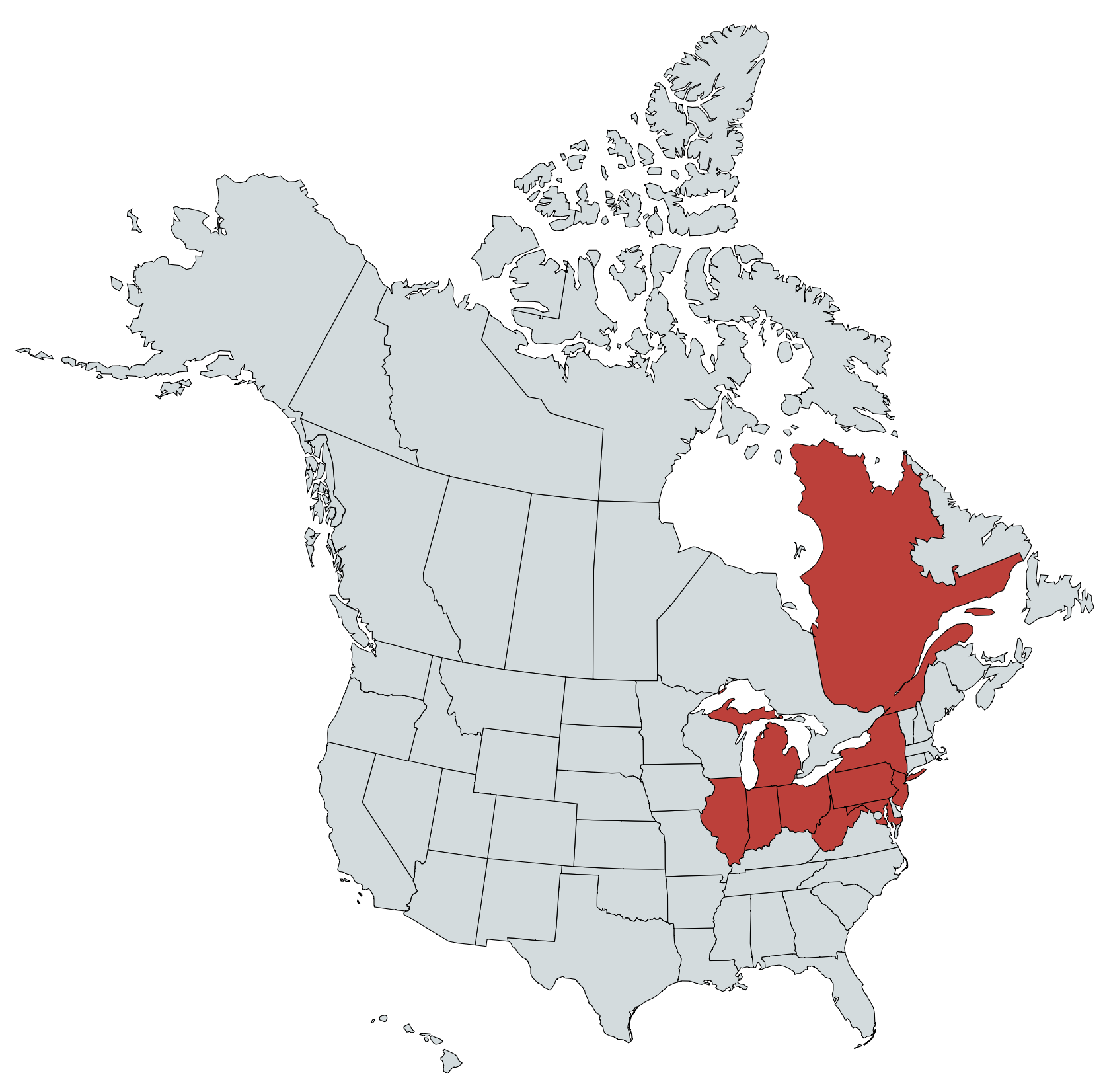
Canadian provinces and US states visited by No. 2102 in excursion service

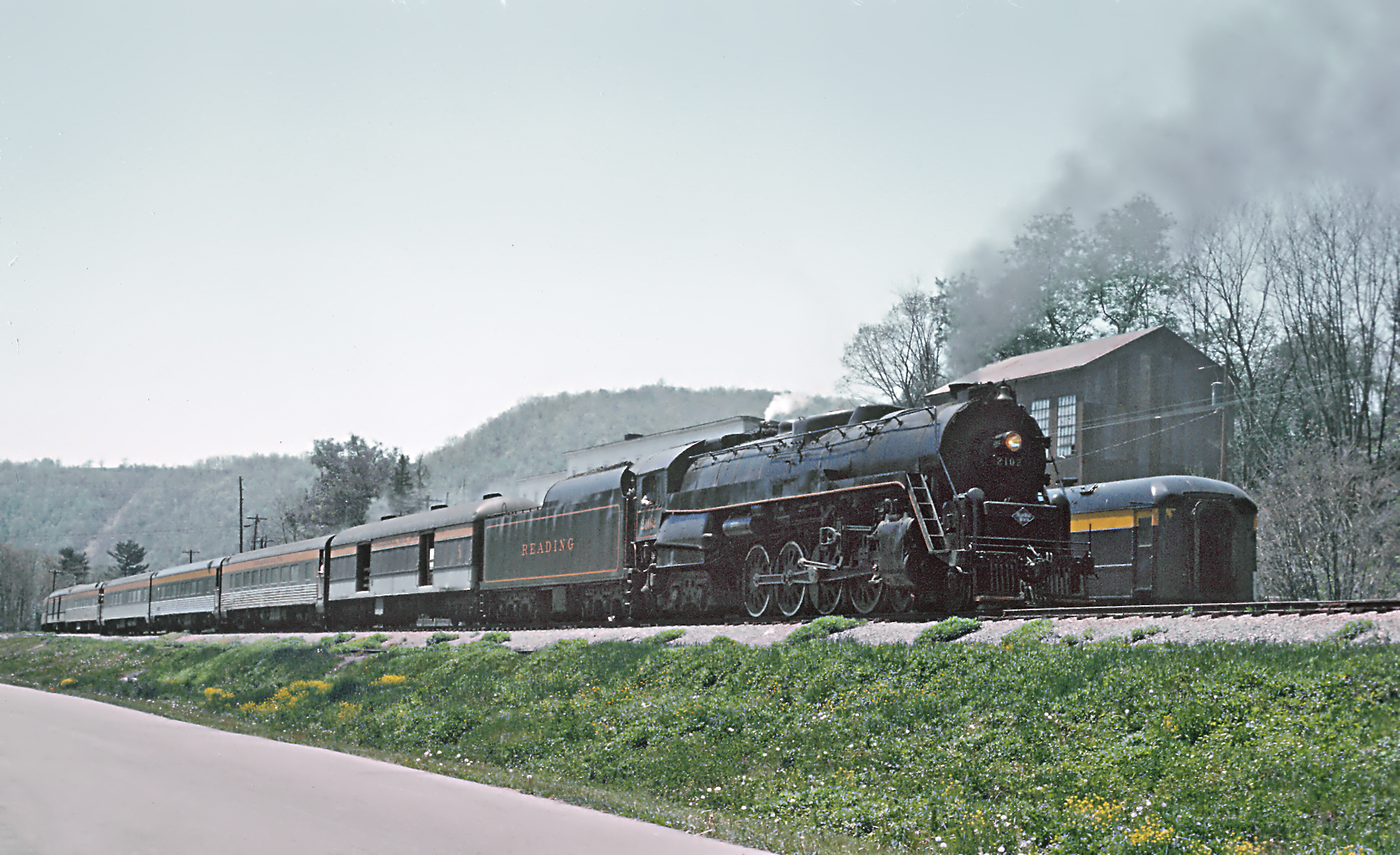
No. 2102 pulling an inaugural train at Cass, West Virginia in May 1971

In the Fall of 1960, the Carpenter Steel plant suffered a catastrophic fire, badly damaging their primary steam generator. After that, No. 2102 was sold back to the Reading Company, which one year prior had decided to spare a few of its T-1s from the scrapper's torch for use on their final excursion fan trips between Wayne Junction in Philadelphia and Shamokin, known as the "Iron Horse Rambles". After repairs made to No. 2102 were completed on April 29, 1962, it joined fellow T-1 No. 2100 and replaced No. 2124, which was sold to Steamtown, U.S.A. after breaking-down. It also performed doubleheaders with No. 2100. The Rambles ended in 1964, and by January 31, 1965, the last remaining T-1s were sold separately. No. 2102 was sold to Steam Tours, Inc., based in Akron, Ohio, and led by Bill Benson. Beginning in 1966, No. 2102 operated in the Northeast, Mid-Atlantic, and Midwest areas of the country. Its main storage site was at Milwaukee Junction in Detroit, Michigan, which was also where Grand Trunk Western USRA 4-6-2 “Pacific” No. 5629 was occasionally stored. In 1968, though, No. 2102 ran an excursion on Grand Trunk Western trackage when a minor derailment damaged its Hennesey oil lubricators on the second driving axle, and the lubricator was subsequently converted to a grease block. The locomotive sat idle for the next three years.

In April 1971, No. 2102 was brought back out of storage for use on an inaugural run along the Greenbrier River from Ronceverte to Cass, West Virginia, as a novel way of letting tourists connect to the remote Cass Scenic Railroad. In 1972, Ross Rowland's High Iron Company (HICO) sponsored several excursions from Reading to Harrisburg on the Reading's mainline to recreate the Iron Horse Rambles, and No. 2102 was loaned to HICO to be used to pull the trains.

In 1973, during the sesquicentennial of the Delaware and Hudson Railway (D&H), No. 2102 was sent to the D&H's Colonie, New York, shops to masquerade as D&H K-62 4-8-4 No. 302, with smoke deflectors, a recessed headlight, raised "bug eye" marker lights and a D&H-style number board. In April, the locomotive performed a 2-day double-headed excursion with Canadian Pacific 4-6-2 No. 1278, which masqueraded as D&H No. 653 at the time, from Albany, New York, to Montreal, Quebec, in Canada. For the rest of 1973, No. 302 pulled various excursions sponsored by HICO from Hoboken, New Jersey, to Binghamton, New York, and excursions sponsored by Steam Tours between Pittsburgh and Shawmut. In 1974, No. 2102 was sold to another Ohio tourist group, the Allegheny Group, where it was reverted to its Reading appearance, but it was re-lettered to "Allegheny". Excursions were conducted on two weekends of May 1976 (May 15-16 and May 22-23) traveling through the Mon Valley on the Pittsburgh and Lake Erie (P&LE) mainline from the Pittsburgh Terminal to Brownsville Junction, returning to Pittsburgh. In 1977, it was sold again to another Ohio railroad group, Rail Diversified.

Later that same year, No. 2102 performed a doubleheader along the famous Horseshoe Curve with Grand Trunk Western 2-8-2 No. 4070. However, that trip was plagued with mechanical issues; while on the curve, No. 4070 threw an eccentric rod, and the busy line where the train sat had to be shut down for several hours. As a result, Conrail banned steam operations for the next several years. Soon, the 2102 was briefly overhauled, by volunteers at the Monongahela Railway's locomotive shops in Brownsville. On September 22, 1983, the 2102 was fired up and was used to pull a freight train south of Pittsburgh, and footage of it was recorded specifically for the 1984 romance film Maria's Lovers.

In September 1985, under the lease of the Reading Company Technical and Historical Society, No. 2102 travelled to the ex-Reading locomotive shops to commemorate the 40th anniversary of the debut of the Reading T-1 class. Andrew J. Muller, Jr., owner of the Blue Mountain and Reading Railroad (BM&R), brought his steam locomotive for the event as well: Ex-Gulf, Mobile and Northern 4-6-2 "Pacific" No. 425, which had recently been restored for the BM&R. During the event, Andy Muller, who had always wanted a Reading T-1, made the financially distressed owners of No. 2102 a generous offer, and purchased No. 2102 in 1986 at an undisclosed cost. No. 2102 then operated more mainline excursions on the BM&R, Conrail and Gettysburg trackage. The locomotive also performed one doubleheader with No. 425 in 1988. Between December 1986 and 1987, No. 2102's tender was given the bold lettering “We the People of Reading and Berks County PA celebrate Constitution Day” to pay homage to the bicentennial of the United States Constitution.

=== Hiatus and second restoration ===
No. 2102's last run in the 20th century occurred on October 27, 1991, after pulling a special 12-car train called The Anthracite Express to Tamaqua, in celebration of the 160th anniversary of the opening of the Little Schuylkill Navigation Railroad. After the event was over, No. 2102 was taken out of service and was due for another overhaul. No. 2102 would remain in storage out of public view inside the Port Clinton shop, but occasionally, it would be brought outside for static display in front of the RBM&N station in Port Clinton.

In January 2016, the RBMN started a mechanical evaluation of the locomotive, with the goal of restoring the locomotive to operation. Muller spent hundreds of thousands of dollars to rebuild the locomotive, with additional funds raised through ticket sales. The inside firebox sheets were replaced, 729 stay bolts were either replaced or repaired, and all flues and tubes were taken out. The rear support was also replaced after an unrepaired crack was discovered.

By the end of 2020, the refurbishment of the boiler was nearing completion. On January 10, 2021, No. 2102 was fired up for the first time in nearly 30 years, and the first time of the 21st century. When tested at working boiler pressure, all components, including the boiler, injectors, feedwater heater, and stoker, were found to be in good working order. The locomotive was still not ready to run yet, as the cab still needed to be reinstalled; and it had borrowed No. 425's tender for the test-fire while its tender was still being repaired. The multi-year project had cost $2.4 million, and taken 5 years to complete.

=== Second excursion service ===
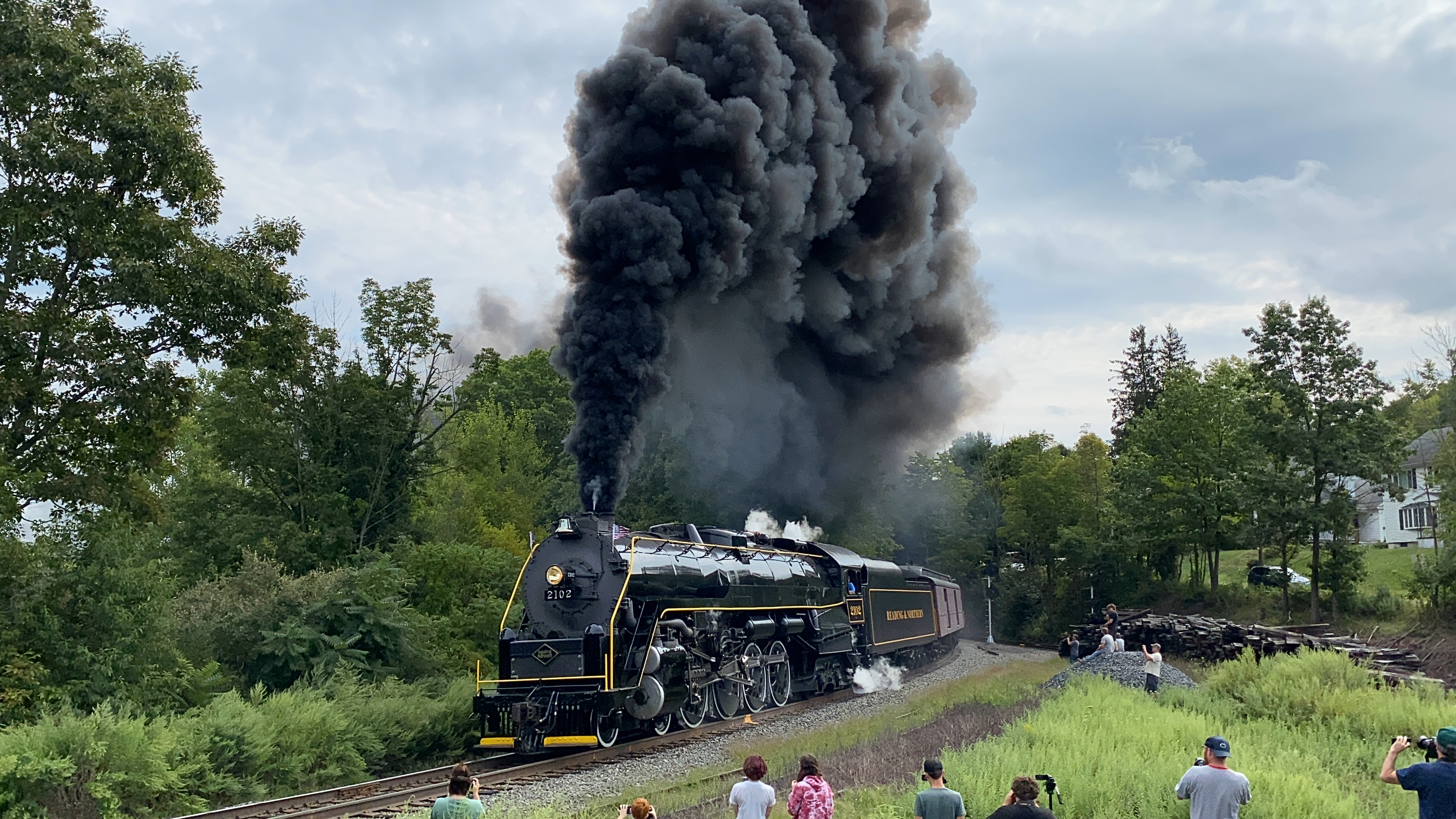
No. 2102 at East Mahanoy Junction, bound for Jim Thorpe in September 2022

In early April 2022, the restoration of No. 2102 to operational condition was completed, and the locomotive moved under its own power for the first time in 31 years. The locomotive was painted in a foobie Reading Rambles livery (except the tender, which was lettered as "READING & NORTHERN"). Test runs in the earlier half of 2022 were to Reading, Tamaqua, and Jim Thorpe, Pennsylvania. On April 26, No. 2102 performed another test run from Reading to Jim Thorpe and return, pulling a long line of fifty empty coal hopper cars. On May 20, the final test run was made from Port Clinton to Tamaqua with 100 empty hopper cars before returning with 50 loaded hoppers.

On May 28, No. 2102 re-entered excursion service, hauling the first Iron Horse Ramble excursion from Reading to Jim Thorpe, Pennsylvania with 19 sold-out passenger cars without diesel assistance. Afterwards, the locomotive pulled more Iron Horse Ramble excursions on July 2, and on August 13, it double headed with No. 425 for the first time since 1988. On August 19, 2102 again pulled revenue freight services, and pulled the final Iron Horse Ramble excursion on September 3. On September 23 and 24, No. 2102 pulled three round trip excursion on R&N's Pottsville Branch between Schuykill Haven and Port Clinton as part of the Schuykill Haven Brough Days. On October 1, 2022, No. 2102 pulled its first Autumn Leaf excursion, but was sidelined on October 8 due to firebox issues, which was repaired four days later in time to continue pulling the remaining scheduled Autumn Leaf excursions on October 29, and November 6, 2022.

In 2023, No. 2102 pulled three more Iron Horse Ramble excursions scheduled for July 1, August 13, and September 2, including the Autumn Leaf excursions on October 1, 14, and 21. In the summer of 2024, No. 2102 pulled two new Iron Horse Rambles round-trip excursions through the Lehigh River Gorge from Nesquehoning, Pennsylvania to Tunkhannock, Pennsylvania on June 22 and Pittston, Pennsylvania on August 17. On February 8, 2025, No. 2102 pulled its first winter season Iron Horse Rambles excursion from Reading to Jim Thrope and back. It also pulled a Rotary Club of Mountain Top sponsored excursion between Mountain Top and Jim Thorpe, Pennsylvania on September 13, 2025. On June 13, 2026, No. 2102 met Union Pacific Big Boy No. 4014, which was traveling on the eastern leg of its Coast-to-Coast tour, a transcontinental excursion commemorating the United States Semiquincentennial event. During the event, the two locomotives were staged side by side for a special photo runby. On June 14, No. 2102 ran another side-by-side run with No. 4014 from Nesquehoning to Pittston. The two locomotives met up and ran another side-by-side run for one final time on July 1, 2026. On July 4, No. 2102 operated an Independence Day excursion from Reading to Jim Thorpe and back.

== See also ==
- Central Railroad of New Jersey 113
- Chesapeake and Ohio 614
- Norfolk and Western 611
- Reading 1251
- Reading 1187
- Reading 2101

== Bibliography ==
- Ziel, Ron (1990). Mainline Steam Revival (1st ed.). Amereon House. ISBN 0-8488-0863-0.
