= Delaware and Hudson K-62 Class =

Retired class of 4-8-4 American steam locomotives

Type and origin
- Power type: Steam
- Builder: American Locomotive Company
- Serial number: 69975-69979, 70133-70142
- Build date: 1943
- Total produced: 15
Specifications
- Configuration
  - Whyte: 4-8-4
  - UIC: 2′D2 h2
- Gauge: 4 ft 8 1/2 in (1,435 mm)
- Leading dia.: 42 in (1,066.800 mm)
- Driver dia.: 75 in (1,905.000 mm)
- Trailing dia.: First axle: 42 in (1.067 m); Second axle: 44 in (1.118 m)
- Adhesive weight: 270,000 lb (120 t; 120 long tons)
- Loco weight: 470,000 lb (210 t; 210 long tons)
- Tender weight: 298,000 lb (135 t; 133 long tons)
- Total weight: 768,000 lb (348 t; 343 long tons)
- Fuel type: Coal
- Fuel capacity: 25 short tons (23 t)
- Water cap.: 20,000 US gal (76,000 L; 17,000 imp gal)
- Firebox
  - Grate area: 96.2 sq ft (8.94 m^{2})
- Boiler pressure: 285 lbf (1.27 kN)
- Heating surface
  - Firebox: 482 sq ft (44.8 m^{2})
  - Total surface: 4,477 sq ft (415.9 m^{2})
- Superheater: 1,473 sq ft (136.8 m^{2})
- Cylinders: Two, outside
- Cylinder size: 24.5 in × 32 in (622 mm × 813 mm)
- Valve gear: Walschaerts
Performance figures
- Maximum speed: 70-95 mph (112-152 km/h)
- Tractive effort: 62,042 lbf (275.98 kN)
- Factor of adh.: 4.35
Career
- Operators: Delaware & Hudson
- Numbers: 300-314
- Retired: 1952–1953
- Disposition: All scrapped

The Delaware and Hudson K-62 Class was a class of fifteen 4-8-4 steam locomotives built by the American Locomotive Company's Schenectady Works in 1943. They were intended as dual-service locomotives, hauling both freight and passenger trains until dieselization in 1953.

== Design ==
The K-62s had a semi-streamlined sort of look to them. This was due to the fact that they used elephant-ear smoke deflectors and the use of side skirts along the running board. The dome and sandboxes were both housed in the same casting, while the headlight was recessed within the smokebox door. This was a feature that could be commonly found on other D&H locomotives such as their P Class and P-1 Class Pacifics and J-95 Class Challengers. Although laid out according to orthodox American design, these engines had a British look in their clean boilers, thick and wide face shield below the smokebox, and plain smokebox face with headlight centered.

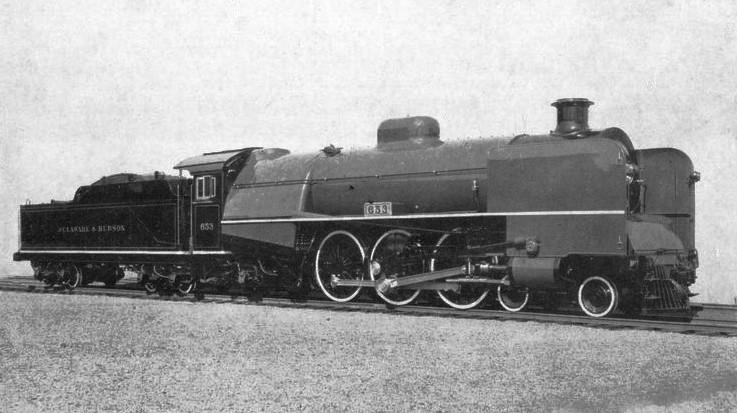
Delaware and Hudson steam locomotive P-1 Class 4-6-2 653

== Similarity to Alco's later 4-8-4s ==
In 1944, Alco took the boiler from the K-62s and tweaked them, resulting in the boilers on the Chicago, Rock Island & Pacific Railroad R-67B Class, Milwaukee Road S3 Class, and Union Pacific FEF-3 Class all being of similar designs. The three later designs all shared the same valve gear, except the FEF-3s had a larger grate area at 100.2 square feet. The R-67Bs and FEF-3s also had similar cylinders as the K-62s, with the boiler being very closely related to those on the S3s. The K-62s and S-3s also had very similar tenders and similar driving wheels, with those on the K-62s being only slightly larger than those on the S3s. All four classes also had Walschaerts valve gear and roller bearings on their driving axles.

== Service and withdrawal ==
The K-62s were assigned to freight work all over the D&H. However, their large 6 ft 3 in (1,905.000 mm) drivers with roller bearings meant that the class were well-equipped to handle passenger trains between New York and Montreal. The class was eventually retired between 1952 and 1953, and like all steam locomotives on the D&H, none were preserved.

== Brief revival ==
Although none of the K-62s survive, one member did return for a short while. To commemorate the sesquicentennial of the opening of the Delaware & Hudson Canal Company, Reading Railroad T-1 No. 2102 masqueraded as No. 302 between 1973 and 1974.

== Surviving Alco 4-8-4s ==
There are four other Alco 4-8-4s that were built during World War II. These are Milwaukee Road S3s Nos. 261 and 265 and Union Pacific FEF-3s Nos. 838 and 844 (8444 between 1962 and 1989). Nos. 261 and 265 are the closest that a preservationist can get to a K-62, having similar boiler dimensions and similarly sized tenders.
