= Maria's Lovers =

1984 film by Andrei Konchalovsky

- Theatrical release poster
- Directed by: Andrei Konchalovsky
- Written by: Gérard Brach; Andrei Konchalovsky; Paul Zindel; Marjorie David
- Produced by: Bosko Djordjevic; Lawrence Taylor-Mortorff
- Starring: Nastassja Kinski; John Savage; Robert Mitchum
- Cinematography: Juan Ruiz Anchía
- Edited by: Humphrey Dixon
- Music by: Gary S. Rema
- Distributed by: Cannon Films
- Release date: 1 September 1984 (Venice)
- Running time: 109 minutes
- Country: United States
- Language: English

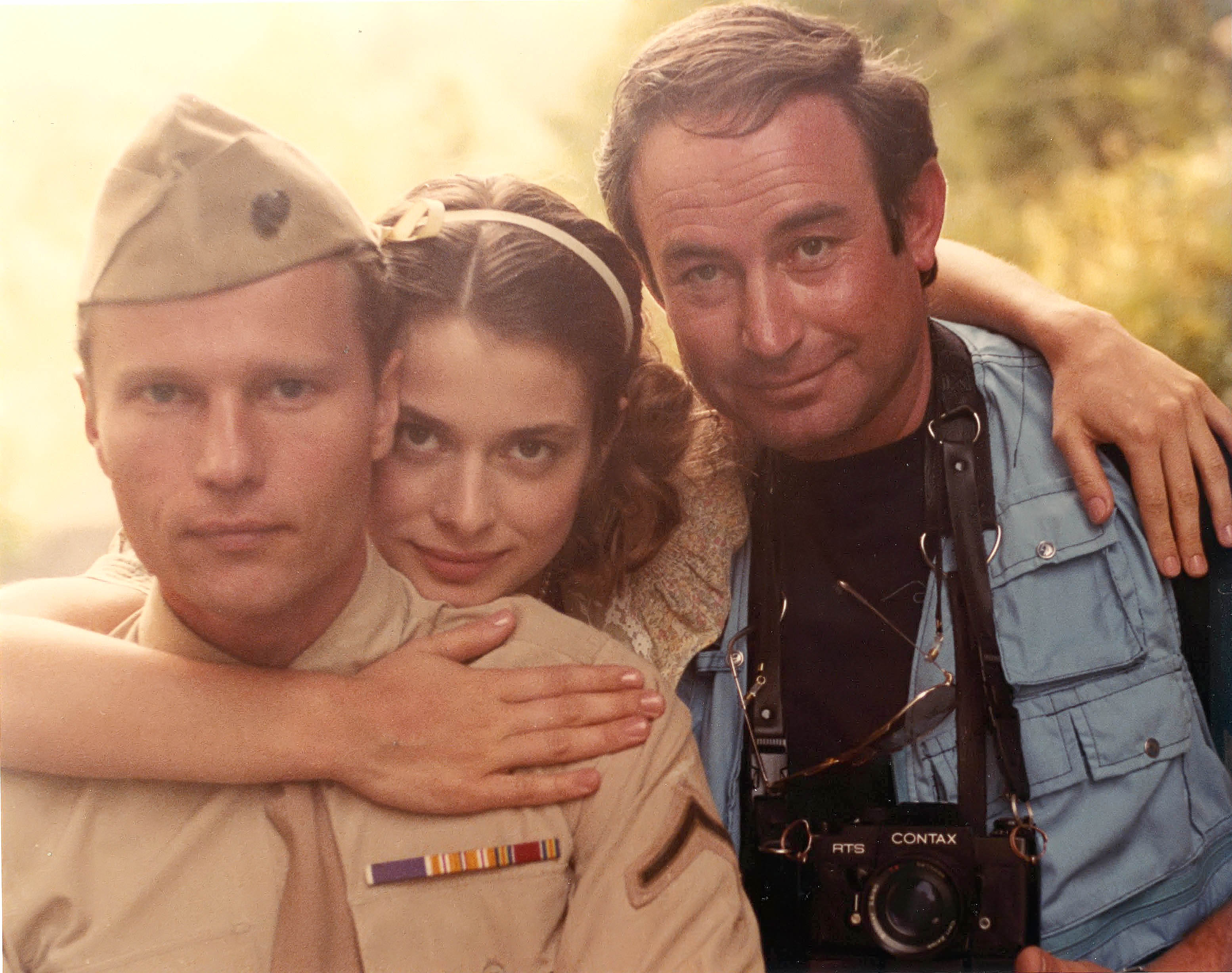
Nastassja Kinski with John Savage and still photographer Yoni S. Hamenachem on the set of Maria's Lovers (1984)

Maria's Lovers is a 1984 American drama film directed by Andrei Konchalovsky and starring Nastassja Kinski, John Savage, and Robert Mitchum. The plot follows a soldier returning from World War II who marries the woman of his dreams, but he is unable to consummate his marriage, ruining the couple's chances of a shared happiness. The film is the first American feature film by Konchalovsky and opened the 41st Venice International Film Festival. Maria's Lovers also was nominated César Award for Best Foreign Film.

== Plot ==
In the spring of 1946, Ivan, an American soldier, returns home psychologically scarred after spending some time in a Japanese prison camp during World War II. Once back in his small Pennsylvania town, Ivan settles in, trying to put his life back together while living with his stoic peasant father.

Shortly after his arrival, Ivan looks for his childhood sweetheart, Maria, a beautiful woman who is taking care of her old deaf grandmother. However, he is disappointed to find Maria in the arms of Al, a captain. Ivan's father thinks that Maria is too good for his son, but perhaps good enough for himself. He pairs his son with Mrs. Wynic, a flirty neighbor. Ivan has sex with her, but he is tormented by the traumas of the war. He tells her that it was his dreams about Maria that allowed him to survive the prison camp.

Ivan is given a hero's welcoming by his community, formed by immigrants from Yugoslavia. During the celebrations, when Al goes to dance with one of Maria's friends, Ivan grabs the opportunity to get close to her. Together they leave the party on his motorbike, heading for their favorite spot of years ago. He gives her a pair of earrings that he planted there for her, before leaving for the war. The next morning, Al is furious and breaks his relationship with Maria. Ivan's goal is fulfilled and he marries Maria, but his dream of a happiness shared with Maria is soon broken. Having adored Maria for so long from afar, now that they are together, Ivan is unable to consummate their marriage, disturbing their happiness.

Maria works as a nurse and would like to have children. Deeply in love with Ivan, she has to deal with her increasing sexual frustration. On the advice of Clarence, a drifter singer passing by the town, Ivan reaffirms his sense of manliness with Mrs. Wynic, with whom he is not impotent. Maria discovers Ivan's infidelity, and a terrible argument ensues between them. Al invites the couple to his engagement party to Maria's girlfriend. In the middle of this gathering, Al breaks off his engagement, realizing that he is still in love with Maria. Al and Ivan have a confrontation. Ivan offers to let Al have Maria, but to demonstrate his own love for Maria, he puts his hand in a burning stove. Maria, very much in love with Ivan, tells Al that she does not love him.

Maria heals Ivan's hand, but the unhappiness between them increases further. She is pursued by Clarence who tries to seduce her, but she remains faithful to Ivan and resists Clarence's advances. One day, unexpectedly, Ivan leaves town by train. Moving to a new city, he starts work in a slaughter house, making new friends.

Left to her own devices, Maria finally succumbs to Clarence's advances. Though she quickly rejects him, she is pregnant. Maria searches out Ivan and tells him of her pregnancy and of the death of her grandmother, but Ivan is now cruelly indifferent towards her.

Out with his friends one night, Ivan meets up with Clarence. Clarence does not remember him and tells the story of how he seduced Maria, and that she later refused to have anything further to do with him. Furious, Ivan hits a still incredulous Clarence.

Ivan, still tormented by nightmares of his war experiences, is visited by his father, who tells Ivan that he is dying and that he must come back to Maria. Ivan returns home, admitting to Maria that he loves her baby. Now that Maria's chaste image has vanished, she and Ivan are able to make love for the first time.

== Cast ==
- Nastassja Kinski as Maria Bosic
- John Savage as Ivan Bibic
- Robert Mitchum as Mr. Bibic
- Keith Carradine as Clarence Butts
- Anita Morris as Mrs. Wynic
- Bud Cort as Harvey
- Vincent Spano as Al Griselli
- Karen Young as Rosie
- John Goodman as Frank
- Tracy Nelson as Joanie
- Danton Stone as Joe
- Lela Ivev as Anna
- Elena Koreneva as Vera
- Anton Sipos as Peter
- Anna Thomson as Kathy
- Tania Harley as Sylvia
- Gary Hileman as Harry
- Ann Caulfield as Louisa
- Mary Hogan as Babushka
- Eddie Steinfeld as Mendelson, The Photographer
- Nardi Novak as Rosie's Mother
- Bill Smitrovich as The Bartender
- Frankie The Dog as Dave The Wonder Dog

== Production ==
The film is the first American feature film by Konchalovsky. In his review of the film in Variety, Todd McCarthy indicated that Konchalovsky was probably the first Russian director to have made a major American film with well-known actors.

The opening sequence features excerpts from John Huston's 1946 U.S. Army documentary Let There Be Light about posttraumatic stress disorder.

Vincent Spano and Nastassja Kinski began a relationship during production. Their son Aljosha was born a few months before the film premiered.

=== Locomotive Appearances ===
Reading T1 Northern #2102 also made appearances in the film while pulling a freight train.

== Release ==
The film opened the Venice film festival.

=== Home media ===
The film was released on DVD in the United States in December 2001.

== Reception ==
=== Critical response ===
Maria's Lovers has an approval rating of 33% on review aggregator website Rotten Tomatoes, based on 6 reviews, and an average rating of 5.88/10.
