= Andrei Konchalovsky =

Russian filmmaker (born 1937)

- Андрей Кончаловский
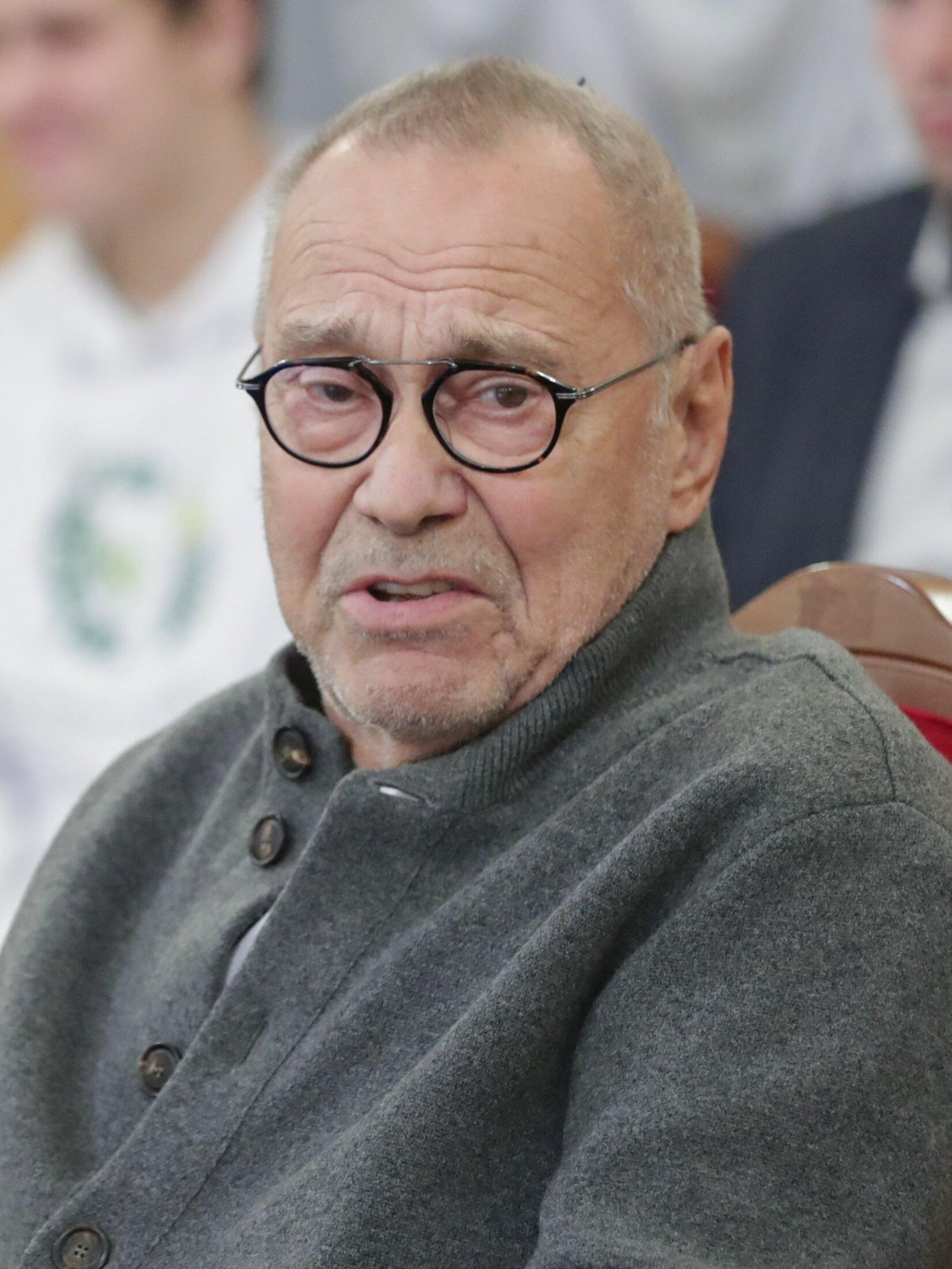
- Konchalovsky in 2023
- Born: Andrei Sergeyevich Mikhalkov; 20 August 1937 (age 89); Moscow, Russian SFSR, Soviet Union
- Other name: Andrei Sergeyevich Mikhalkov-Konchalovsky
- Occupations: Director; screenwriter; producer
- Years active: 1960–present
- Spouses: Irina Kandat (m. 1955–1957); Natalya Arinbasarova (m. 1965–1969); Viviane Gaudet (m. 1969–1980); Irina Martynova (m. 1990–1997); Julia Vysotskaya (m. 1998)
- Children: 7
- Father: Sergey Mikhalkov
- Relatives: Nikita Mikhalkov (brother)
- Family: Mikhalkov
- Konchalovsky's voice Konchalovsky on the Echo of Moscow program, 2013
- Website: www.konchalovsky.ru

Andrei Sergeyevich Konchalovsky (Russian: Андрей Сергеевич Кончаловский; né Mikhalkov; born 20 August 1937) is a Russian film and theatre director, screenwriter, and producer. His filmmaking career spans over 60 years in Soviet, Hollywood, and contemporary Russian cinema. Early in his career, he was a screenwriting collaborator of Andrei Tarkovsky. His film credits include Uncle Vanya (1970), Siberiade (1979), House of Fools (2002), The Postman's White Nights (2014), Paradise (2016), and Dear Comrades! (2020). During the 1980s, he resided in the United States, where he directed films such as Maria's Lovers (1984), Runaway Train (1985), Shy People (1987), and Tango & Cash (1989). He also directed the 1997 miniseries adaptation of the ancient Greek narrative The Odyssey.

His films have won numerous accolades, including the Cannes Grand Prix Spécial du Jury, a FIPRESCI Award, two Silver Lions, three Golden Eagle Awards, and a Primetime Emmy Award. He is the laureate of several civil honours in Russia and abroad, including the Order "For Merit to the Fatherland", a National Order of the Legion of Honour, a French Officer of the Order of Arts and Letters, a Cavalier of the Order of Merit of the Italian Republic and a People's Artist of the RSFSR.

Konchalovsky is a member of the Mikhalkov family. His father is Sergey Mikhalkov, the lyricist of the Soviet and Russian national anthems, and his brother is filmmaker Nikita Mikhalkov.

== Early life and ancestry ==
Konchalovsky was born Andrei Sergeyevich Mikhalkov on 20 August 1937 in Moscow, Russia, then part of the Soviet Union. The Mikhalkov family has centuries-old artistic and aristocratic heritage tracing their roots to the Grand Duchy of Lithuania; in 2009, Konchalovsky testified that a great-grandfather resided in Lithuania. His mother was poet Natalia Konchalovskaya, and his father was writer Sergey Mikhalkov. Konchalovsky's brother is filmmaker Nikita Mikhalkov. Konchalovsky is frequently referred to as Andron, but as he stated several times, Andron was just a diminutive used by his grandfather and never was his official name; he prefers the name Andrei.

== Career ==
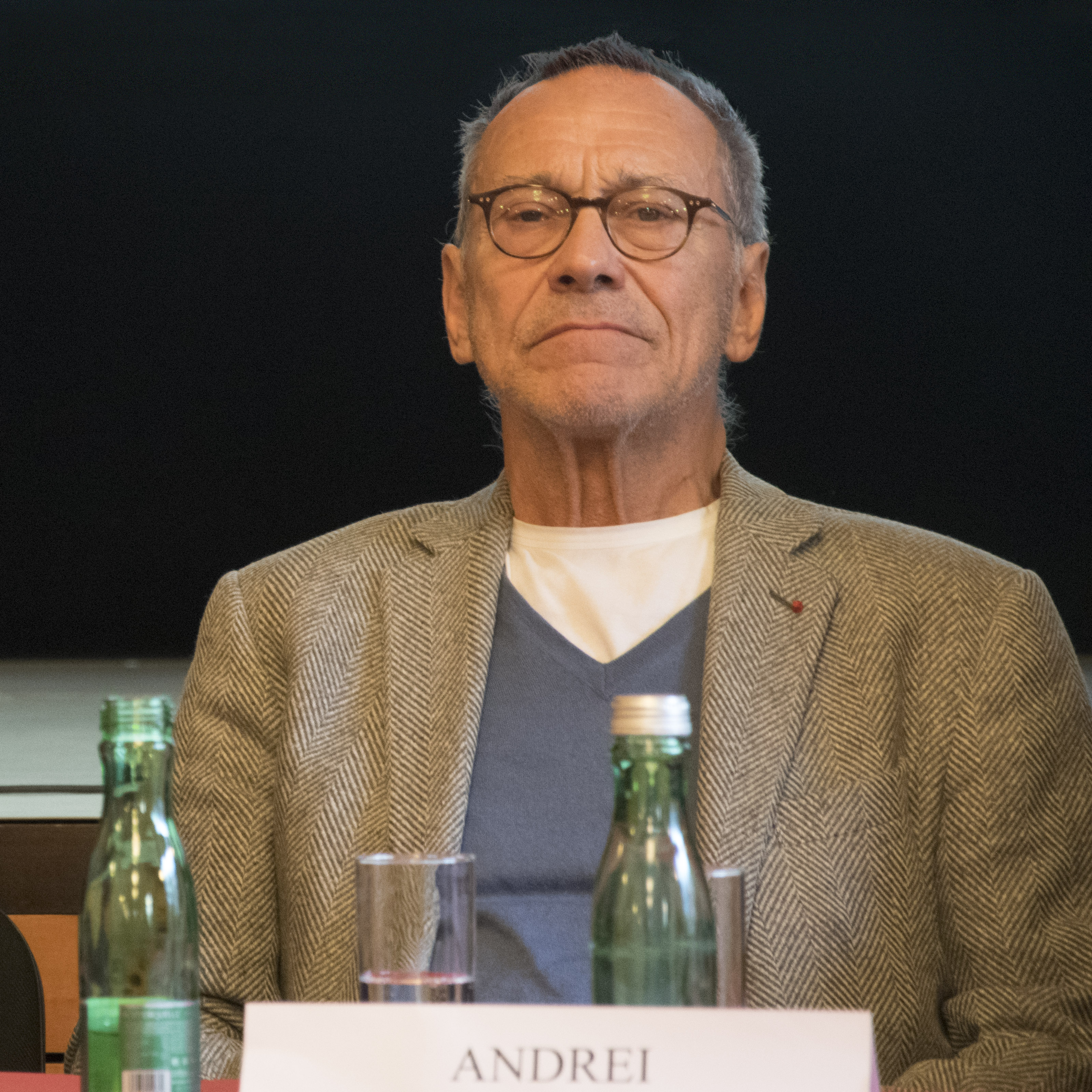
Konchalovsky at a press conference in Vienna, 2016.

Konchalovsky studied for ten years at the Moscow Conservatory, preparing for a pianist's career. In 1960, however, he met Andrei Tarkovsky, whom he collaborated with on Ivan's Childhood and Andrei Rublev.

His first own full-length feature, The First Teacher (1964), was favourably received in the Soviet Union and screened by numerous film festivals abroad. His second film, Asya Klyachina's Story (1967), was suppressed by Soviet authorities. When issued twenty years later, it was acclaimed as his masterpiece. Thereupon, Konchalovsky filmed adaptations of Ivan Turgenev's A Nest of Gentle Folk (1969) and Chekhov's Uncle Vanya (1970), with Innokenty Smoktunovsky in the title role.

In 1979 he was a member of the jury at the 11th Moscow International Film Festival. His epic Siberiade upon its 1979 release was favourably received at Cannes, particularly for its scene featuring the binding and abuse of a Siberian Lynx, and made possible his move to the United States in 1980.

His most popular Hollywood releases are Maria's Lovers (1984), Runaway Train (1985), based on a script by Japanese director Akira Kurosawa (who had written it as an adaptation of Dostoevsky's "House of the Dead"), and Tango & Cash (1989), starring Sylvester Stallone and Kurt Russell. In 1985, Ned Tanen wanted to hire Konchalovsky to direct The Godfather Part III, but the other executives at Paramount Pictures concluded the film could not be made without Francis Ford Coppola and Mario Puzo's involvement. In the 1990s, Konchalovsky returned to Russia, although he occasionally produced historical films for U.S. television, such as his adaption of The Odyssey (1997) and the award-winning remake, The Lion in Winter (2003). In a 2023 SAG-AFTRA Foundation interview, Emily Blunt stated that she auditioned for a role in the latter film, and said of Konchalovsky that "he was vile... he was really horrible," and that he was "really cruel during the audition and loved taking me down a peg or two." Blunt claimed that he promoted a "very misogynistic sort of vibe, and I was a shell of my former self by the time I came out."

Konchalovsky's full-length feature, House of Fools (2003), with a cameo role by Bryan Adams as himself, set in a Chechen psychiatric asylum during the war, won him a Silver Lion at the Venice Film Festival.

In 2010, Konchalovsky released a longtime passion project of his, The Nutcracker in 3D, a musical adaptation of Peter Ilyich Tchaikovsky's ballet. A musical film, it mixed live action and 3D animation, and starred Elle Fanning, John Turturro, Nathan Lane, and Richard E. Grant. The film was scored with music from the ballet, with additional lyrics by Tim Rice. The film was universally panned by critics and audiences.

In the same year, Konchalovsky also featured in Hitler in Hollywood, a bio-doc about Micheline Presle which evolves into a thrilling investigation of the long hidden truth behind European cinema. This mockumentary thriller uncovers Hollywood's unsuspected plot against the European motion picture industry. The film won the FIPRESCI Prize at the Karlovy Vary International Film Festival and was nominated for a Crystal Globe award in July 2010.

In 2012, Konchalovsky wrote, directed and produced The Battle for Ukraine, which provided an in depth analysis of how Ukraine to this day struggles to escape from the close embrace of its former big brother, Russia. This extensive study lasted for almost three years and involved an array of Ukrainian, Russian and American historians, politicians and journalists, as well as the ex-President of Poland Aleksander Kwaśniewski, the ex-President of Slovakia Rudolf Schuster, the ex-President of Georgia Eduard Shevardnadze, the seventh Secretary-General of the United Nations Kofi Annan, the ex-Prime Minister of Russia Viktor Chernomyrdin, and the businessman Boris Berezovsky.

In 2013, Konchalovsky co-produced Royal Paintbox, a documentary directed by Margy Kinmonth. The film features Charles III, then Prince of Wales, exploring the history of artistic activity within the British royal family. It includes works created by members of the royal family across several countries, including watercolours by the Prince of Wales., and was filmed at various Royal Estates.

His film The Postman's White Nights won the Silver Lion at the 71st Venice International Film Festival. The script is centered around the true story of Aleksey Tryaptisyn, a real life Russian Post officer based in a remote Russian Far North village surrounding Lake Kenozero.

In 2016, Paradise directed by him won the Silver Lion at the 73rd Venice International Film Festival. It was selected as the Russian entry for the Best International Feature Film at the 89th Academy Awards.

In 2020, Konchalovsky directed Dear Comrades!, a historical drama about the Novocherkassk massacre. The film won the Special Jury Prize at the 77th Venice International Film Festival. Anthony Lane, writing for The New Yorker, called the film Konchalovsky's "masterpiece."

== Political views ==
In 2012, Konchalovsky was one of 103 public figures to sign a petition in support of the band Pussy Riot during their 2012 trial.

Konchalovsky endorsed Sergey Sobyanin of United Russia in the 2013 Moscow mayoral election.

In 2014, Konchalovsky signed a statement condemning the Russian annexation of Crimea. However by 2017, he made statements supporting the annexation, claiming it was necessary.

In 2020, Konchalovksy stated in an interview that he believed Nikita Khrushchev's debunking of Joseph Stalin's cult of personality during De-Stalinization was a mistake.

Konchalovsky has voiced support for the ongoing Russian invasion of Ukraine. On January 15, 2023, Konchalovsky was sanctioned by the Ukrainian government.

In the run-up to the Russian presidential election in 2024, Konchalovsky supported Vladimir Putin's candidacy, describing him as "an extraordinary leader, the most courageous and wise person".

== Personal life ==
Konchalovsky has been married five times. His first wife was Irina Kandat. His second wife was Russian actress Natalya Arinbasarova, with whom he has one son: Russian film director Egor, born 15 January 1966. His third wife was Viviane Godet, with whom he has a daughter, Alexandra Mikhalkova, born 6 October 1971. His fourth wife was Irina Ivanova, with whom he has two daughters. His fifth wife is Russian actress Julia Vysotskaya; they have been married since 1998 and have two children.

== Honours ==
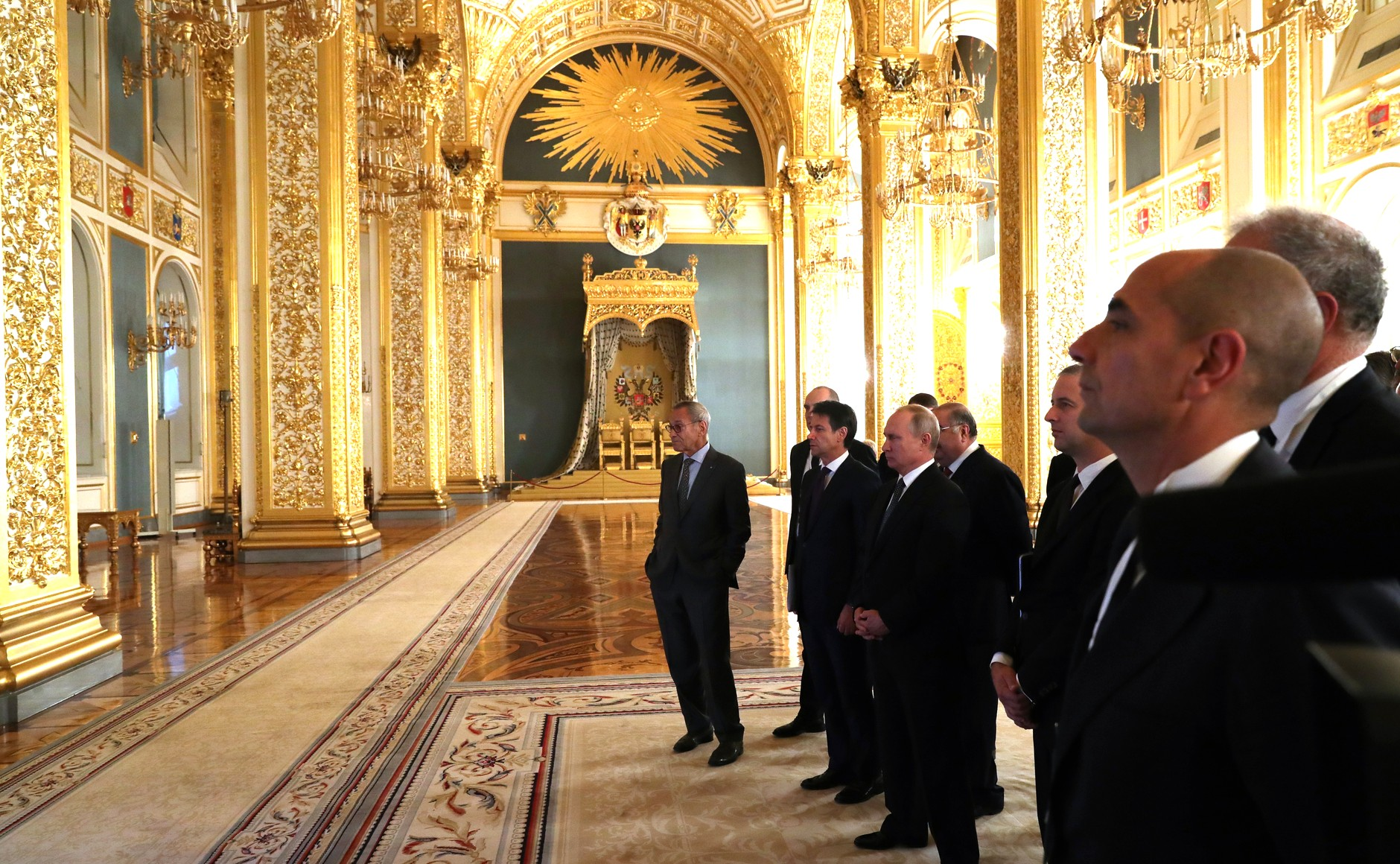
Vladimir Putin and Prime Minister of Italy Giuseppe Conte at a screening of Sin, presented by Konchalovsky, 24 October 2018.

- 2018 Cavalier of the Order of Merit of the Italian Republic (Italy)
- 2018 Russian Ludvic Nobel award (Russia)
- 2017 Award of the Government of the Russian Federation in Culture for his theater work (Russia)
- 2017 The Bridge Award by the Bernhard Wicki Foundation (Germany)
- 2017 The title of Professor of Moscow State University (Russia)
- 2017 'Person of the Year' award by Federation Of Jewish Communities in Russia (Russia)
- 2017 The Federico Fellini Prize 'For a special contribution to the development of the cinema' (Italy)
- 2017 The European Medal of Tolerance (ECTR), 'For his cultural achievements focused on preserving the tragic memory of the past including his film 'Paradise' (Brussels)
- 2016 'Baltic Star International Award' for Developing and Consolidating Humanitarian Relations in Countries of the Baltic Region (Russia)
- 2016 Rivista del Cinematografo Award, Vatican (Italy)
- 2016 The Robert Bresson Prize, Vatican (Italy)
- 2015 The Moscow Times Awards 'Person of the Year' (Russia)
- 2012 Award 'For Contribution to Enlightenment', Kazan International Festival of Muslim Films (Russia)
- 2012 International Award of Chingiz Aitmatov, 'For Studio adaptation of a novel' for the movie 'The First Teacher', 1965,
- 2011 National Order of the Legion of Honour (Ordre national de la Légion d'honneur) (France)
- 2011 The title of Honorary Doctor of the University (National University of Theatre Arts and Cinema (UNATC)
- 2011 Honorary award 'Doctor Honorius Causa' for the contribution to cinema (Romania)
- 2011 Award 'For the contribution to cinema', International Film Festival of Andrei Tarkovsky 'Zerkalo' (Russia)
- 2010 Honorary Award to outstanding citizen of the city of Tuscany (Italy)
- 2010 Commemorative Medal '150th anniversary of Anton Chekhov', award 'For the contribution to the theatrical art' (Russia)
- 2008 'Gold Star' special award for the contribution to development of the world cinema (Marrakech International Film Festival, Morocco)
- 2006 Russian Film Directors Guild Award for citizenship, integrity and contribution to cinema (Russia)
- 2005 Officer of the Order of Arts and Letters (France)
- 2003 Order of Danaker (Kyrgyzstan)
- 2002 The title of 'Honorary Professor of Cinematography' for outstanding contribution to the art, culture and cinema, VGIK (Russia)
- 2002 Academician of the National Academy of Motion Picture Arts and Sciences (Russia)
- 1997 Special Silver St. George for his contribution to world cinema, 20th Moscow International Film Festival (Russia), 1997
- 1997 Order "For Merit to the Fatherland" 4th class (Russia)
- 1997 Medal 'In Commemoration of the 850th Anniversary of Moscow' (Russia)
- 1980 People's Artist of the RSFSR (USSR)
- 1974 Honored Artist of the RSFSR (USSR)
- 1972 State Prize of the Kazakh SSR (USSR)

== Filmography ==
=== Feature film ===
| Year | Title | Functioned as | | | Country of Origin |
| Year | Title | Director | Writer | Producer | Country of Origin |
|---|---|---|---|---|---|
| 1962 | Ivan's Childhood | No | Yes | No | Soviet Union |
| 1965 | The First Teacher | Yes | Yes | No | Soviet Union |
| 1966 | Andrei Rublev | No | Yes | No | Soviet Union |
| 1967 | Tashkent | No | Yes | No | Soviet Union |
| 1967 | The Story of Asya Klyachina | Yes | No | No | Soviet Union |
| 1969 | A Nest of Gentry | Yes | Yes | No | Soviet Union |
| 1970 | End of the Ataman | No | Yes | No | Soviet Union |
| 1970 | Uncle Vanya | Yes | Yes | No | Soviet Union |
| 1972 | We're Waiting for You, Lad | No | Yes | No | Soviet Union |
| 1972 | The Seventh Bullet | No | Yes | No | Soviet Union |
| 1974 | The Fierce One | No | Yes | No | Soviet Union |
| 1974 | A Lover's Romance | Yes | No | No | Soviet Union |
| 1976 | A Slave of Love | No | Yes | No | Soviet Union |
| 1978 | Blood and Sweat | No | Yes | No | Soviet Union |
| 1979 | Siberiade | Yes | Yes | No | Soviet Union |
| 1984 | Maria's Lovers | Yes | Yes | No | United States |
| 1985 | Runaway Train | Yes | No | No | United States |
| 1986 | Duet for One | Yes | Yes | No | United Kingdom |
| 1987 | Shy People | Yes | Yes | No | United States |
| 1989 | Tango & Cash | Yes | No | No | United States |
| 1989 | Homer and Eddie | Yes | No | No | United States |
| 1991 | The Inner Circle | Yes | Yes | No | United States | Soviet Union | Italy |
| 1994 | Assia and the Hen with the Golden Eggs | Yes | Yes | Yes | Russia |
| 2002 | House of Fools | Yes | Yes | Yes | Russia |
| 2007 | Gloss | Yes | Yes | Yes | Russia |
| 2007 | Moscow Chill | No | Yes | Yes | Russia |
| 2010 | The Nutcracker | Yes | Yes | Yes | Hungary | United Kingdom | Russia |
| 2014 | The Postman's White Nights | Yes | Yes | Yes | Russia |
| 2016 | Paradise | Yes | Yes | Yes | Russia | Germany |
| 2019 | Sin | Yes | Yes | Co-producer | Russia | Italy |
| 2020 | Dear Comrades! | Yes | Yes | Yes | Russia |

Executive producer

- The Last Station (2009)

=== Documentary film ===
| Year | Title | Functioned as | | | Country of Origin |
| Year | Title | Director | Writer | Producer | Country of Origin |
|---|---|---|---|---|---|
| 2005 | Culture is Destiny | No | Yes | Yes | Russia |
| 2012 | The Battle for Ukraine | Yes | Yes | Yes | Russia |
| 2020 | Homo Sperans | Yes | Yes | Yes | Russia |

Co-producer

- Royal Paintbox (2013)

=== Short film ===
| Year | Title | Functioned as | | Country of Origin | Notes |
| Year | Title | Director | Writer | Country of Origin | Notes |
|---|---|---|---|---|---|
| 1960 | The Steamroller and the Violin | No | Yes | Soviet Union | |
| 1961 | The Boy and the Dove | Yes | Yes | Soviet Union | |
| 1982 | Split Cherry Tree | Yes | No | United States | |
| 2007 | Dans le noir | Yes | No | France | Segment of To Each His Own Cinema |

=== Television ===
| Year | Title | Functioned as | | Country of Origin | Notes |
| Year | Title | Director | Writer | Country of Origin | Notes |
|---|---|---|---|---|---|
| 1977 | Trans-Siberian Express | No | Yes | Soviet Union | |
| 1997 | The Odyssey | Yes | No | United States | Miniseries |
| 2003 | The Lion in Winter | Yes | No | United States | Television film |
| 2025 | Khroniki russkoy revolyutsii | Yes | Yes | Russia | |

== Stage credits ==
=== Plays ===
- Eugene Onegin. A play performed at La Scala, Italy, in 1985.
- The Queen of Spades. A play performed at La Scala, Italy, in 1990.
- Miss Julie. A play performed at the Malaya Bronnaya Theatre, Moscow, in 2005.
- King Lear. A play performed at Na Woli, Warsaw, in 2006.
- The Seagull. A play performed at the Odeon Theatre, Paris, in 1987, and at the Mossovet Theatre, Moscow, in 2004. Toured Italy in 2007.
- Uncle Vanya. A play performed at the Mossovet Theatre, Moscow, since 2009. Toured Italy in 2009, the Baltics in 2009 and Israel in 2010.
- Three Sisters. A play performed at the Mossovet Theatre, Moscow, since 2012.
- La Bisbetica Domata. A play performed at the San Ferdinando Theater, Naples, 2013.
- Edip di Colone. A play performed at Teatro Olimpico, Vicenza, 2014.
- The Cherry Orchard. A play performed at the Mossovet Theatre, Moscow, since 2016.
- Edip di Colone. A play performed at the Tovstonogov Bolshoi Drama Theater, Saint-Petersburg, since 2017.

=== Operas ===
- War and Peace. An opera staged at the Mariinsky Theatre, St. Petersburg, in 2000, and at the Metropolitan Opera, New York, in 2002 and 2009.
- Un ballo in maschera. An opera staged at the Teatro Regio, Italy, in 2001, and at the Mariinsky Theatre, St. Petersburg, in 2001.
- Boris Godunov. An opera staged at the Teatro Regio, Turin, Italy, in 2010.
- Our Ancient Capital. A musical event held to commemorate Moscow's 850th anniversary pageant on Red Square in 1997.
- Celebrating 300 Years of St. Petersburg A show held in St. Petersburg, in 2003.

== Awards and nominations ==
=== Main awards ===
| Year | Award | Work | Result |
BAFTA Awards
| 2021 | Best Film Not in the English Language | Dear Comrades! | Nominated |
César Awards
| 1985 | Best Foreign Film | Maria's Lovers | Nominated |
Emmy Awards
| 1997 | Outstanding Directing for a Limited Series, Movie, or Dramatic Special | The Odyssey | Won |
| 2004 | Outstanding Directing for a Limited Series, Movie, or Dramatic Special | The Lion in Winter | Nominated |
Golden Eagle Awards
| 2003 | Best Motion Picture | House of Fools | Nominated |
| 2003 | Best Director | House of Fools | Nominated |
| 2015 | Best Motion Picture | The Postman's White Nights | Nominated |
| 2015 | Best Director | The Postman's White Nights | Nominated |
| 2015 | Best Screenplay | The Postman's White Nights | Won |
| 2017 | Best Motion Picture | Paradise | Won |
| 2017 | Best Director | Paradise | Won |
| 2017 | Best Screenplay | Paradise | Nominated |
| 2021 | Best Motion Picture | Dear Comrades! | Nominated |
| 2021 | Best Director | Dear Comrades! | Won |
| 2021 | Best Screenplay | Dear Comrades! | Nominated |
Nika Awards
| 1989 | Best Director | The Story of Asya Klyachina | Won |
| 2015 | Best Film | The Postman's White Nights | Nominated |
| 2015 | Best Director | The Postman's White Nights | Nominated |
| 2017 | Best Film | Paradise | Won |
| 2017 | Best Director | Paradise | Won |
| 2017 | Best Screenplay | Paradise | Nominated |
| 2020 | Best Film | Sin | Nominated |

=== Film festivals ===
| Year | Award | Work | Result |
Bergen International Film Festival
| 2002 | Jury Award (Honourable Mention) | House of Fools | Won |
Berlin International Film Festival
| 1988 | FIPRESCI Prize (Honourable Mention) | The Story of Asya Klyachina | Won |
| 1992 | Golden Bear | The Inner Circle | Nominated |
Camerimage Festival
| 2005 | Special Award (for "Director with Special Visual Sensitivity") | —N/a | Won |
Cannes Film Festival
| 1979 | Palme d'Or | Siberiade | Nominated |
| 1979 | Grand Prix | Siberiade | Won |
| 1986 | Palme d'Or | Runaway Train | Nominated |
| 1987 | Palme d'Or | Shy People | Nominated |
| 1994 | Palme d'Or | Assia and the Hen with the Golden Eggs | Nominated |
Capri Hollywood International Film Festival
| 2003 | Legend Award | —N/a | Won |
Chicago International Film Festival
| 1971 | Best Feature | Uncle Vanya | Nominated |
| 1979 | Gold Hugo | Siberiade | Nominated |
| 2016 | Gold Hugo | Paradise | Nominated |
| 2020 | Gold Hugo | Dear Comrades! | Nominated |
| 2020 | Silver Hugo | Dear Comrades! | Won |
Cleveland International Film Festival
| 2017 | George Gund III Memorial Central and Eastern European Film Competition | Paradise | Nominated |
Copenhagen International Documentary Film Festival
| 2014 | CPH:DOX Award | The Postman's White Nights | Nominated |
Deauville American Film Festival
| 1989 | Critics Award | Homer and Eddie | Nominated |
Flaiano Festival
| 2003 | Career Award for Cinema | —N/a | Nominated |
Gijón International Film Festival
| 2016 | Grand Prix Asturias | Paradise | Nominated |
GoEast
| 2015 | ŠKODA Film Award | The Postman's White Nights | Nominated |
Karlovy Vary International Film Festival
| 1974 | Crystal Globe | A Lover's Romance | Won |
San Sebastián International Film Festival
| 1971 | Silver Seashell | Uncle Vanya | Won |
| 1989 | Golden Seashell | Homer and Eddie | Won |
Lisbon & Estoril Film Festival
| 2020 | Best Film | Dear Comrades! | Nominated |
Mar del Plata International Film Festival
| 2016 | Best Film | Paradise | Nominated |
| 2016 | Best Screenplay | Paradise | Won |
Monte-Carlo Television Festival
| 2004 | Golden Nymph | The Lion in Winter | Won |
Moscow International Film Festival
| 1997 | Honorary Prize (for "contribution to the cinema") | —N/a | Won |
| 2020 | Silver St. George | Homo Sperans | Nominated |
Moscow Jewish Film Festival
| 2017 | Honorary Award ("for outstanding contribution to the development of Jewish cinema in Russia") | —N/a | Won |
Munich Film Festival
| 2017 | Lifetime Achievement Award | Paradise | Won |
Tromsø International Film Festival
| 1995 | Import Award | Assia and the Hen with the Golden Eggs | Won |
| 2016 | Aurora Award | The Postman's White Nights | Nominated |
Venice Film Festival
| 1966 | Golden Lion | The First Teacher | Nominated |
| 1984 | Golden Lion | Maria's Lovers | Nominated |
| 2002 | Golden Lion | House of Fools | Nominated |
| 2002 | Grand Jury Prize | House of Fools | Won |
| 2002 | UNICEF Award | House of Fools | Nominated |
| 2014 | Golden Lion | The Postman's White Nights | Nominated |
| 2014 | Silver Lion | The Postman's White Nights | Won |
| 2014 | Green Drop Award | The Postman's White Nights | Won |
| 2016 | Golden Lion | Paradise | Nominated |
| 2016 | Silver Lion | Paradise | Won |
| 2020 | Golden Lion | Dear Comrades! | Nominated |
| 2020 | Special Jury Prize | Dear Comrades! | Won |
