= Julia Vysotskaya =

Russian actress and television presenter (born 1973)

- Юлия Высоцкая
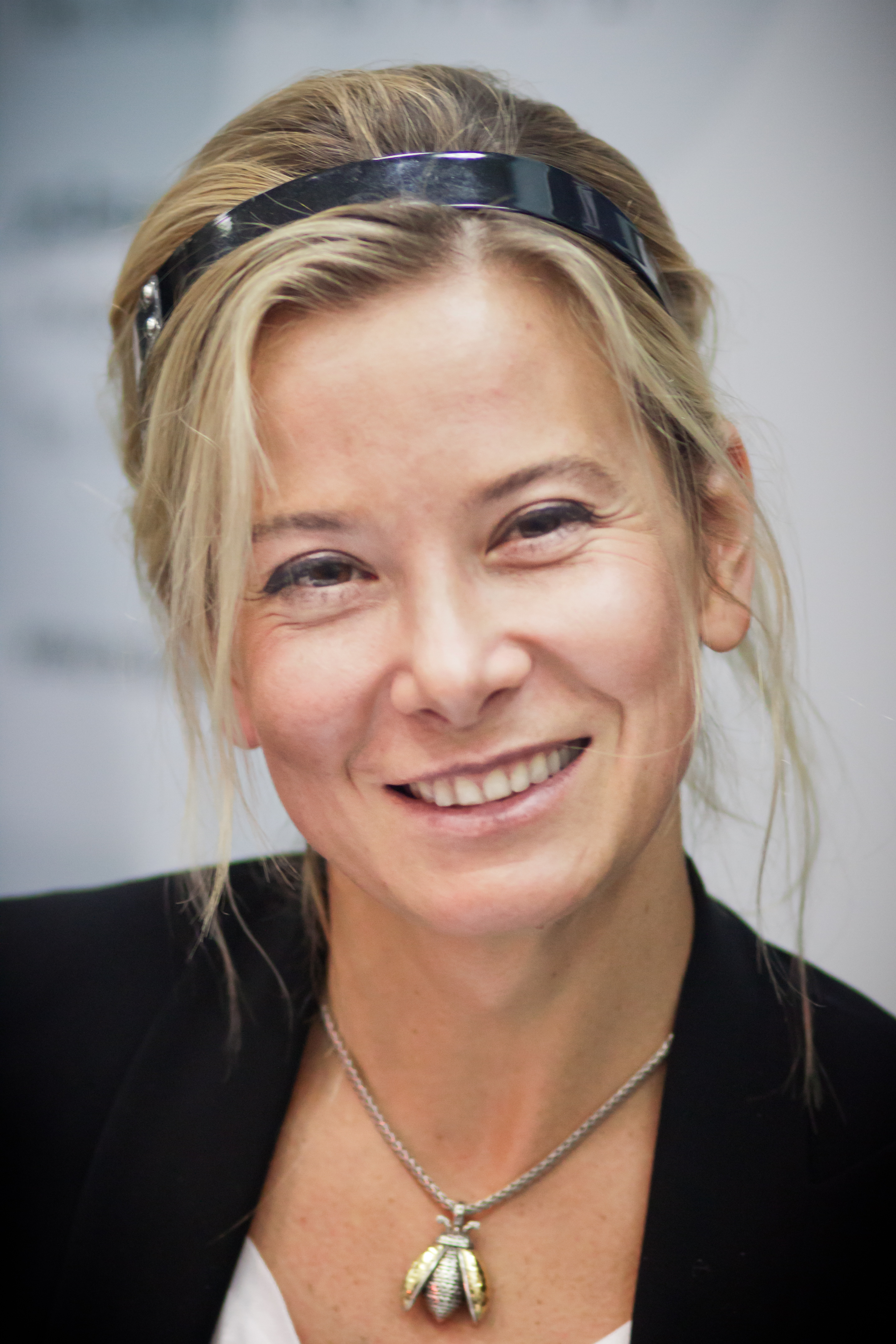
- Vysotskaya in 2013
- Born: Julia Alexandrovna Vysotskaya; 16 August 1973 (age 53); Novocherkassk, Rostov Oblast, RSFSR, USSR
- Citizenship: Russia; Belarus
- Occupations: Actress, tv presenter, writer
- Years active: 1992–present
- Spouse: Andrei Konchalovsky (m. 1998)
- Children: 2
- Website: www.edimdoma.ru

Julia Alexandrovna Vysotskaya (Russian: Юлия Александровна Высоцкая, romanized: Yuliya Aleksandrovna Vysotskaya; born 16 August 1973) is a Russian actress and television presenter.

== Biography ==
Julia Vysotskaya was born in Novocherkassk, Rostov Oblast, Russian SFSR, Soviet Union (now Russia). She finished high school № 9 in the city of Baku in 1990. She graduated in drama from the Belarusian State Academy of Arts in 1995 and the London Academy of Music and Dramatic Art in 1998.

She worked at the Belarusian Janka Kupała National Academic Theatre, where she played the lead role in productions of The Star Without a Name and The Bald Soprano (both by Romanian playwrights) among others.

She has acted in productions staged at the Mossovet Academy Theatre.

Since 2003 she has presented the evening programme Let's Eat at Home! and the morning show Breakfast with Julia Vysotskaya on NTV.

In 2008 she was invited to be the culinary supervisor at a Russian evening held during the World Economic Forum in London. In 2009 she was culinary director of the Moscow restaurant "Family Floor".

She has been the editor-in-chief of the culinary magazine KhlebSol since 2009, year in which she also helped set up the www.edimdoma.ru culinary social network and the first online cooking channel www.edimdoma.tv where users can watch Julia Vysotskaya preparing dishes, and her video blog, which is regularly updated with new content.

Vysotskaya is the author of numerous cookery best-sellers, of which she has already sold over one and half million copies.

The actress has received wide acclaim for her portrayal of Olga in the 2016 Holocaust drama Paradise.

=== Personal life ===
She has been married to film director Andrei Konchalovsky since 1998. They have two children, a daughter, Maria (1999), and a son, Petr (2003).

== Recognitions and awards ==
- Best Actress Award for her role in John Osbourne's play Look Back in Anger
- Best Actress Award at the "Vivat, kino Rossii" festival for her role in House of Fools
- In 2007, her programme Let's Eat at Home! received the prestigious "TEFI" award in the Entertainment Programme. Way of Life category, and an "Effie" award for Brand of the Year.
- In 2009, the programme Let's Eat at Home! was awarded the "Approved by Russian Ecologist" accolade in recognition of its work promoting a healthy lifestyle.
- Best Actress Award at the Golden Eagle Awards for her role in Paradise
- Best Actress Award at the Nika Awards for her role in Paradise
- Best Actress Award at the Munich International Film festival for her role in Paradise

== Work in the theatre ==
=== Yanka Kupala National Academic Theatre ===
- 1993: The Bald Soprano by E. Ionesco — Mrs. Smith
- 1995: Look Back in Anger by J. Osborne — Alison
- 1995: The Star Without a Name by M. Sebastian — Mona
- 2002: Love Is a Golden Book, play inspired by A. Tolstoy's work

=== Mossovet Theatre ===
- 2004: The Seagull by A. Chekhov — Nina Zarechnaya
- 2009–present day: Uncle Vanya by A. Chekhov — Sonya

=== Moscow Dramatic Theatre on Malaya Bronnaya ===
- 2005 and 2009: Miss Julie by A. Strindberg — Miss Julie

== Filmography ==
Year	Title	Role	Notes
1992	To Go and Not Return	Zosya	TV
1994	Bewitched	Girl in the public debate	
1994	Game of the Imagination	Zhenya	
2002	House of Fools	Zhanna Timofeeva	
2002	Max	Helen	
2003	The Lion in Winter	Alais	
2005	Soldiers' Decameron	Vera	
2006	The First Rule of the Queen	Inna Seliverstova	Mini-series
2007	Gloss	Galya	
2010	The Nutcracker in 3D	Mother / The Snow Fairy	
2016	Paradise	Olga	
2020	Dear Comrades!	Lyudmila 'Lyuda' Syomina	
2025	Khroniki russkoy revolyutsii	Ariadna Alexandrovna Slavina	

== Bibliography ==
1. 2006 — "Let's Eat at Home. Recipes by Julia Vysotskaya"
2. 2007 — "Let's Eat at Home all Year Round"
3. 2007 — "Gloss"
4. 2008 — "Let's Eat at Home Every Day"
5. 2008 — "Tasty Notes"
6. 2009 — "I Eat, I Run, I Live"
7. 2010 — "Cooking for Kids of All Ages"
8. 2010 — "New Year Recipes"
9. 2011 — "One, Two and Ready"
