= John Brannen (singer) =

American singer-songwriter

- Born: March 19, 1952 (age 74); Savannah, Georgia, U.S.
- Origin: Charleston, South Carolina, U.S.
- Genres: Heartland rock, roots rock
- Years active: 1983–present
- Website: johnbrannen.com

John Brannen (born March 19, 1952) is an American roots rock/ heartland rock, singer-songwriter whose song "Somebody" appeared on the Eagles album Long Road Out of Eden. Brannen is heralded as an "underground legend" and has been active as a songwriter and performer since the early 1980s.

== Biography ==
=== Early life ===
Brannen was born into a prominent and storied Southern family in Savannah, Georgia, United States. His parents first met at a diplomatic function in China, where his mother worked for the American consulate. Brannen's father, a cotton broker of some note, died unexpectedly and under strange circumstances in Brazil shortly before John was born. After his father's death, Brannen's mother moved to the coastal town of Bluffton, South Carolina where she would later raise John with help from her father. It was through his maternal grandfather – a man of stature with a predilection for classic poets, especially Tennyson and Longfellow – that Brannen first came into touch with his passion for lyricism and, subsequently, music. By the time he turned eighteen, Brannen had hitchhiked across the United States, surfed extensively in Hawaii, and sailed the West Indies. It was around this period in time that he became acquainted with Waylon Jennings, who he cites as "the voice," and his paramount influence. After a brief stint at The College of William & Mary where he planned to major in political science, Brannen abandoned secondary education for a career in music.

=== Career ===
In the 1980s, Brannen spent time in New York City and Nashville before being wheedled into a move to the West Coast by Joe Walsh, guitarist for the Eagles, who had become a friend and mentor of Brannen's. The move to Los Angeles quickly paid off, as Brannen landed an artist deal at the Capitol Records imprint, Apache Records. His Apache debut, Mystery Street found its way into the Top 20, and the music video for his first single "Desolation Angel" garnered considerable attention as an MTV Hip Clip. By 1993, in the wake of the success of Mystery Street, Brannen was signed by the recently renamed Mercury Nashville Records. His eponymous debut for Mercury Nashville contained the single "Moonlight and Magnolias," which became a Top 10 hit on VH1. In an effort to launch Brannen's career, Mercury Nashville chose him for one of three slots on the Triple Play Tour. The remaining two slots were filled by Shania Twain and Toby Keith.

In the wake of the Triple Play Tour, Brannen went on a self-imposed hiatus, settling in Charleston's French Quarter and "burying himself in the sand," as he has put it. Seven years passed between his eponymous Mercury Nashville debut and Scarecrow, his 2000 release for Corazong Records. After Scarecrow, Brannen was signed by Sly Dog Records.

Since his return to the limelight in 2000, Brannen has been compared to Bruce Springsteen, John Mellencamp, Tom Petty, and Jackson Browne. Of these comparisons, Springsteen is the most frequently posited. The Good Thief and Twilight Tattoo, released in 2004 and 2006, respectively, are his most recent records. Twilight Tattoo, which features "A Cut So Deep," a duet with Lucinda Williams, was co-produced by Brannen and David Z. Most recently, Brannen has had success as the songwriter of "Somebody" which appeared on Eagles album, Long Road Out of Eden, and was co-written with Brannen's longtime collaborator and friend, Jack Tempchin.

== Discography ==
- Mystery Street (1988)
- John Brannen (1993)
- Scarecrow (2000)
- The Good Thief (2004)
- Twilight Tattoo (2006)
- Bravado (2010)
