= Volodymyr Kistion =

Ukrainian biochemist and politician

- Володимир Кістіон
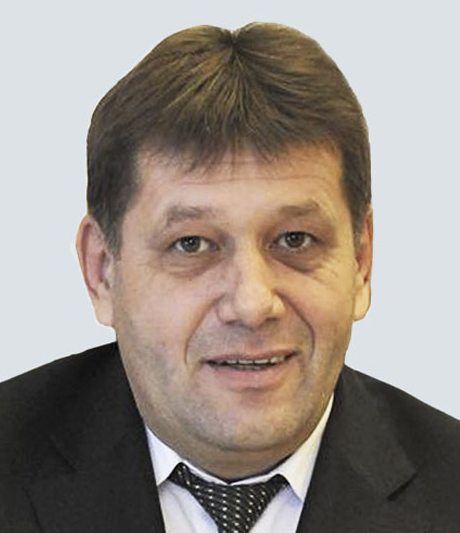

Vice Prime Minister (on Energy, Ecology, and use of Natural Resources)
- In office 14 April 2016 – 29 August 2019
- Prime Minister: Volodymyr Groysman

Personal details
- Born: May 31, 1965 (age 61) Dovzhok, Yampil Raion, Vinnytsia Oblast, Ukrainian SSR
- Education: Odesa State Academy of Civil Engineering and Architecture; Odesa Regional Institute of State Administration (branch of the National Academy for Public Administration
- Occupation: Biochemist, statesman

Volodymyr Yevseviiovych Kistion (Ukrainian: Володимир Євсевійович Кістіон; 31 May 1965) is a Ukrainian biochemist and politician.

== Early life ==
Kistion was born on 31 May 1965 in Dovzhok in the Yampil Raion, which was located within the Ukrainian SSR of the Soviet Union. He was initially trained as a civil engineer, graduating from the Odesa State Academy of Civil Engineering and Architecture with a specialization in water supply and management. He later also received a master's degree in public administration from the Odesa Regional Institute of State Administration (a branch of the National Academy for Public Administration.

After graduation, he worked as maintenance worker for a municipal utilities combine within Yampil in Vinnytsia. By 1990, he had become head of the Yampil water supply and sewerage enterprise for the city. In 2001, he was appointed head of the regional municipal water supply enterprise "Vinnytsiavodokanal".

== Political career ==
In 2008, he was elected Deputy Mayor of Vinnytsia, which he served as until 2011. He was then, from July 2011 to October 2014, the First Deputy Mayor of Vinnytsia. On 13 October 2014 he was appointed First Deputy Minister of Regional Development, Construction, and Housing & Communal Services, before being dismissed on 4 June 2015. On 14 April 2016, he was appointed Vice Prime Minister of Ukraine, and was given the specific responsibilities of on energy, ecology, and use of natural resources by the government on 18 April 2016. His appointment ended when Prime Minister Volodymyr Groysman's term ended on 29 August 2019.

In the 2019 Ukrainian parliamentary election, Kistion ran an unsuccessful campaign for the Ukrainian parliament in Ukraine's 11th electoral district, based in Vinnytsia. He came in fifth place, receiving 9.37% of the overall vote. Maksym Pashkovsky, a candidate from the Servant of the People party, won 26.39% of the vote and took first place. After this election, Kistion, as the next in line, took the seat in the Vinnytsia Oblast Regional Parliament of a European Solidarity MP who was elected to the Verkhovna Rada (Ukraine's national parliament).
