= Igor Chepusov =

Ukrainian broadcaster (1950–2011)

- Born: July 16, 1950; Odesa, Ukraine
- Died: August 2, 2011 (aged 61); Edgewater, New Jersey, USA
- Occupation(s): Film producer, cameraman and photographer
- Known for: Movie productions in the USSR and TV productions in the USA

Igor Chepusov (Russian: Игорь Серге́евич Чепусов, Ukrainian: Ігор Сергійович Чепусов; 1950-2011) was a Soviet and American producer, script writer, director, artist, architect, photographer, director of photography and cameraman. His photography was utilized in eight movies. He came to the United States in 1990 to work, as a cameraman for the Russian Television Network. He co-produced several documentaries

== Early life ==
Chepusov was born on July 16, 1950, in Odesa, Ukraine. As a child Igor attended Odesa's art school. He graduated from Odesa State Academy of Civil Engineering and Architecture in 1973 to be an architect, and at the National University of Theatre, Film and TV in Kyiv to be a director of photography / cameraman in 1979.

== Professional career ==
He worked as a director of photography at the Dovzhenko Film Studios in Kyiv, the Odesa Film Studio (1980-1990), and the Gorky Film Studio. As a director of photography, he filmed eight full-length motion pictures, to include The Golden Chain (1986) based on the novel by Alexander Grin, The Golden Wedding (1987), and Sanitary Zone (1990). Other titles include his debut picture Krupni Razgovor (Large Conversation - 1980) and Ozjog (The Burn) with actress Lyudmila Gurchenko.

== Immigration and broadcasting career ==
Chepusov immigrated with his family to the US on May 22, 1990, where he became the first cameraman on the first Russian Television Network in America (RTN) operated by Russian Media Group, and worked with notable television hosts like Alla Kigel and Alexander Gordon (journalist). In the fall of 1993 he started work at a new Russian-based network in Fort Lee, NJ - WMNB. He later left the network to join Wostok Entertainment and produced a show for the audience in Russia with Alexander Gordon called New York, New York: America Good and Bad. After several successful seasons of the show, he returned to RTN, which had by now merged with WMNB to remain America's only domestic Russian-language network.

== Personal projects ==
Chepusov continued to produce shows and documentaries on the side with producers like Andrei Zagdansky, Alla Kigel and many others. Some notable documentaries include Yesterday and Today (2002), Fathers and Sons (2005) and Confessions of an Immigrant Igor continued to take photographs and painted with watercolors in his spare time. Also, some weekends were spent producing wedding videos for Russian-speaking customers in New York to help offset his relatively low-paying network jobs. Chepusov died on August 2, 2011 in New Jersey. He is survived by four sons.
