= Maestro Thief =

- Russian: Маэстро вор
- Directed by: Vladimir Shamshurin
- Written by: Vladislav Romanov
- Produced by: Vladislav Romanov
- Starring: Vladimir Ferapontov; Anatoli Golik; Ilya Ilin; Nina Ilyina; M. Kochukov
- Cinematography: Mikhail Skripitsyn
- Edited by: Yelena Galkina
- Music by: Boris Kiselyov
- Release date: 1994
- Country: Russia
- Language: Russian

Maestro Thief (Russian: Маэстро вор) is a 1994 Russian action film directed by Vladimir Shamshurin.

== Plot ==
The son of one famous artist contacted a suspicious company and as a result he must pay a lot of money to scammers. Now the artist is thinking how to take revenge.

== Cast ==
- Vladimir Ferapontov
- Anatoli Golik
- Ilya Ilin
- Nina Ilyina
- M. Kochukov
- Viktor Kosykh
- Alexandru Lungu
- Eduard Martsevich
- Anastasiya Nemolyaeva
- Andrey Nevraev
