= History of Yampil, Vinnytsia Oblast =

The history of Yampil began in the 1200s. The city is located in the Vinnytsia Oblast, on the Dnister River, directly on the Ukrainian border with Moldova. The population is a bit over 10,000.

Time period	Territorial belonging
13th – first half of 14th century	The area was inhabited by Tartar hordes
End of 14th century	The territory belonged to Lithuanian Grand Duke Algirdas (1296 - 1377)
15th century	Yampil was a part of the Bratslav province (the administrative unit of the Grand Duchy of Lithuania)
End of 16th – H1 17th century	Yampil with other Bratslavs’ settlements became the property of the Great Crown Hetman, Polish statesman of the Polish-Lithuanian Commonwealth of Jan Zamoyski
1642	Yampil became the property of the cornet Great Crown of the Polish-Lithuanian Commonwealth of Aleksander Koniecpolski (1620 - 1659)
1648	Yampil joined to the Mogilev and later Bratslav regiment as a squadron town
1672–1690	Yampil was a part of the Bratslav regiment which was under the control of Turkish army
1690	Yampil as a part of Bratslav regiment joined eventually to the Podolsky regiment of the Polish-Lithuanian Commonwealth
1710	Yampil which was a property of Hetman Ivan Skoropadsky was sold to Duke Olexandr Menshikov
1751	The Russian Empress Elizabeth donated Yampil for last Hetman of Ukraine Kirill Razumovsky
End of 18th century	Yampil was bought by noble Dominik Orlowski. Subsequently he sold Yampil for Kiev governor Prot Potocki
1795	Yampil became a parish of Bratslav province of the Russian Empire
1796	Yampil parish was joined to Podolsky Guberniya of the Russian Empire
Beginning of 19th century	After bankruptcy of Prot Potocki Yampil became a property of Maciej Dobrzanski
End of 19th – H1 20th century	Most of Yampils’ possession including mansion house belonged to Faustyn Witkowski
Since March 1917	Power passed from hand to hand: Ukrainian Central Rada, the Hetmanate, the Directorate, the Soviet government
February 18, 1918	The Soviet government was established
1924	Yampil acquired the status of township as a part of Podolsk province (1924, on the territory of Podolsk and Odessa provinces were created Moldavian Autonomous SSR)
February 27, 1932	Township Yampil belonged to newly formed Vinnitsa Region of Ukrainian SSR
July 21, 1941	Yampil was occupied by German and Romanian troops and subsequently incorporated into the Dzhuhastryansky parish
May 17–29, 1944	Yampil was realised
Present	Yampil is a center of Yampil district of Vinnitsa Region of Ukraine.

== Sources and further reading ==
- Д. С. Вирський, Д. Я. Вортман. Ямпіль // (In Ukrainian)
- А.П. Заблоцький. Я́мпіль // Історія міст і сіл Української РСР : у 26 т. / П.Т. Тронько (голова Головної редколегії). — К. : Головна редакція УРЕ АН УРСР, 1967 - 1974 — том Вінницька область / А.Ф. Олійник (голова редколегії тому), 1972 : 788с. — С.725-734 (In Ukrainian)
