= Voore, Jõgeva County =

Village in Estonia

Voore
- Village
- Location in Estonia
- Coordinates: 58°43′10″N 26°44′52″E
- Country: Estonia
- County: Jõgeva County
- Municipality: Mustvee Parish
- Established: 1977

Population (2011)
  - Total: 320

Drone video of Voore in August 2021

Voore is a village in Mustvee Parish, Jõgeva County in Estonia. With a population of 320 (As of 2011) it's the largest village in the municipality.

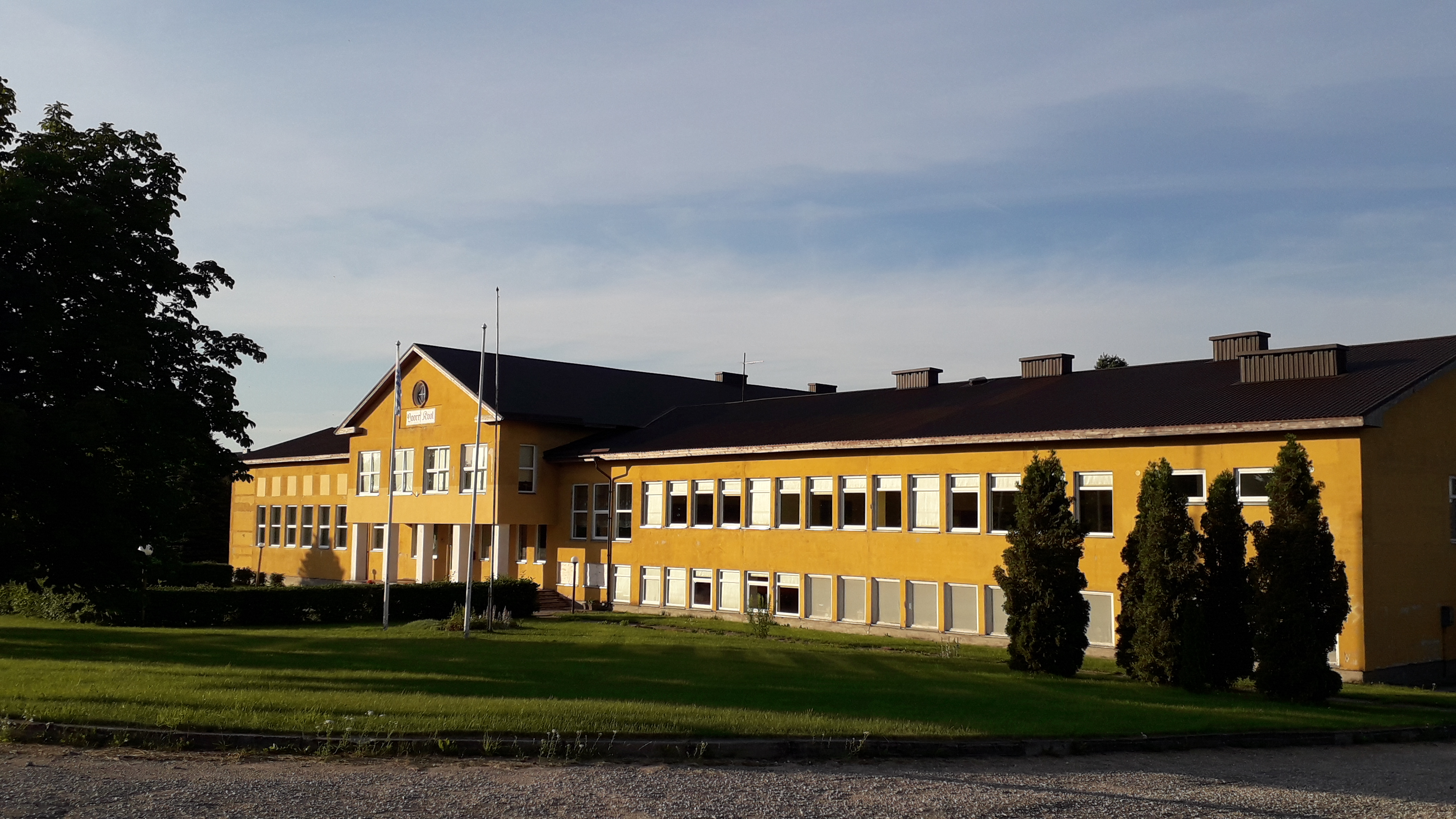
Voore school

There are two hill forts in the village territory. One of them originates from the beginning of the 2nd millennium and the other is most likely from the same time.

Voore was the site of a medieval knight manor known as Roela Manor (Rojel). It was first mentioned in the 16th century when it belonged to the von Brackels. After that, it was owned by the von Wrangells, and from 1725 till the dispossession in 1919 to the von Lipharts. The historicist 2-storey main building was erected in the 1850s–60s. It burned down in World War II during the battle of Roela on 31 July 1941. Most of the ruins were demolished in the 1970s, and only a tower and some foundations have survived. Also, the park and the alleys have survived. There was a singing stage inside the park.

The history of Voore Primary School dates back to 1774. In 1895, the nearby Kallivere and Vassevere schools were merged and a new schoolhouse was built on the hillside of Leedimägi. From 1924 to 1979, the school bore the name of Leedimäe. Since 1970, the school has operated in the former local government building. Old schoolhouse is now part of Voore Guesthouse complex.

Voore village was established in 1977 by merging the Roela settlement with Linnamäe, Mägivälja villages and the northern part of Vassevere village.

Besides the school, there's a guesthouse, library and a shop in Voore.

The Kullavere River passes through Voore, there's the Voore impounded lake.

Writer, essayist, and theatre director Mati Unt (1944–2005) was born in Linnamäe village which is now part of Voore village. Actor Leonhard Merzin (1934–1990) was born in nearby Aruküla village (now part of Maardla).

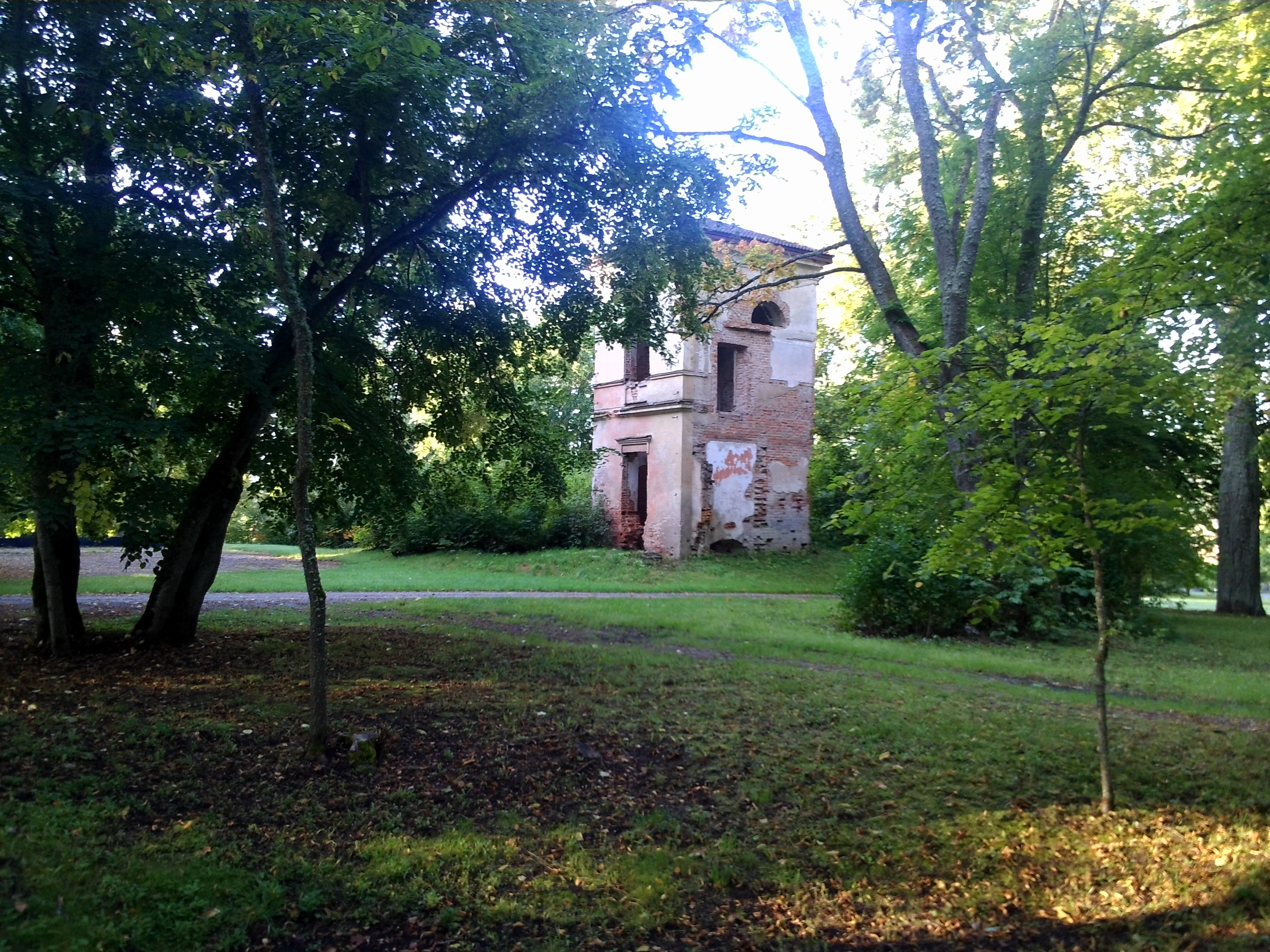
Ruins of Roela manor main house

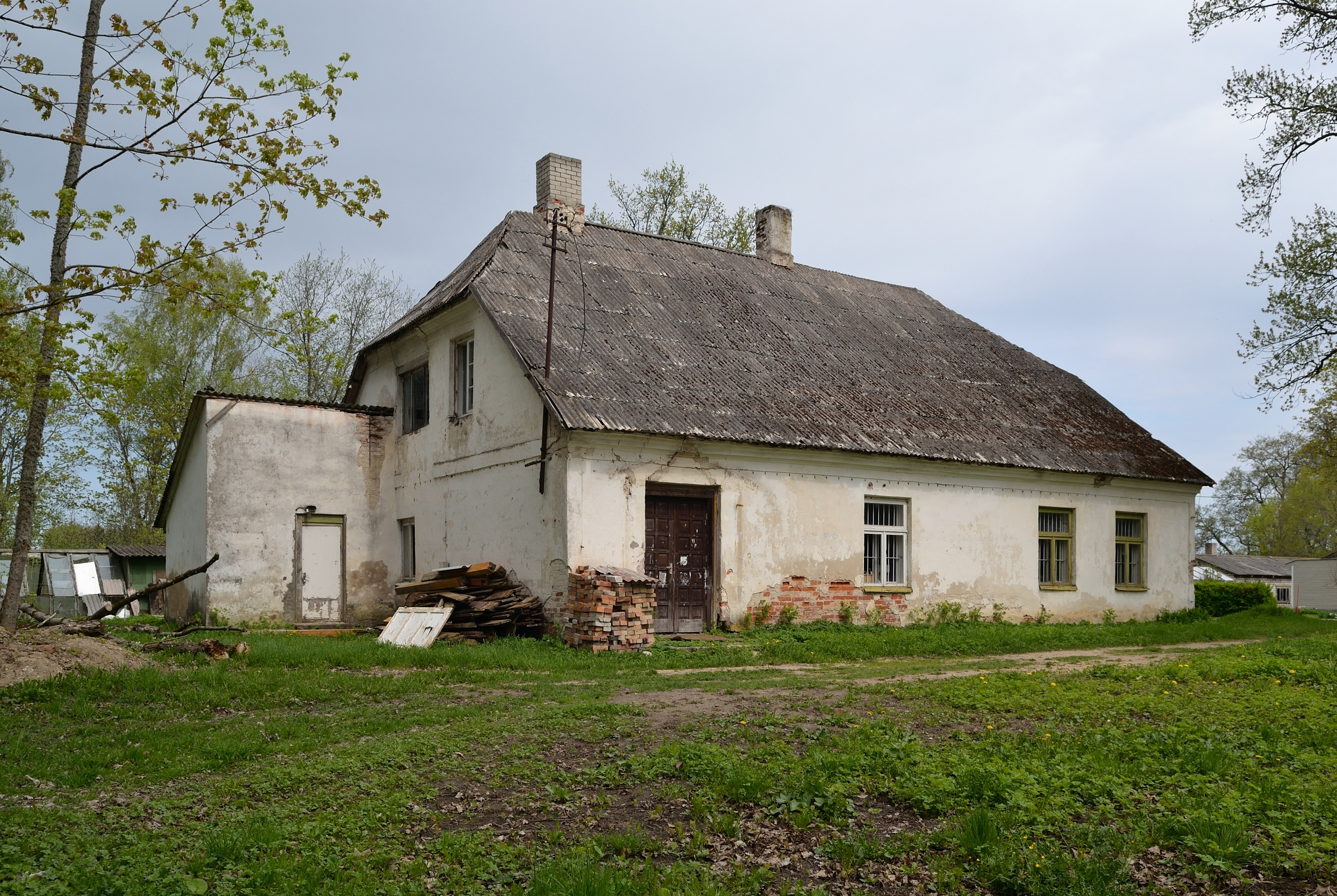
Roela manor steward's house

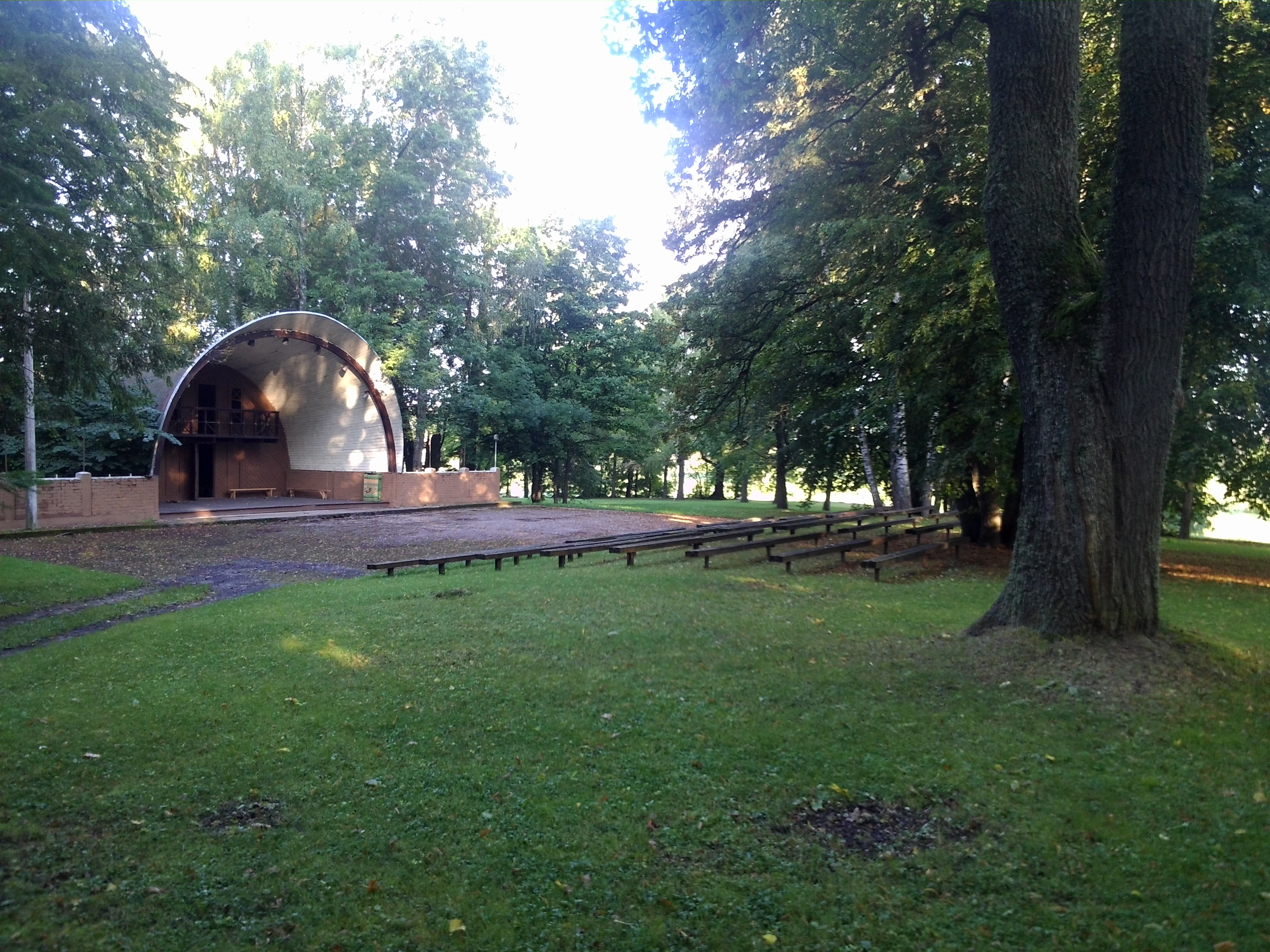
Singing stage in Roela manor park

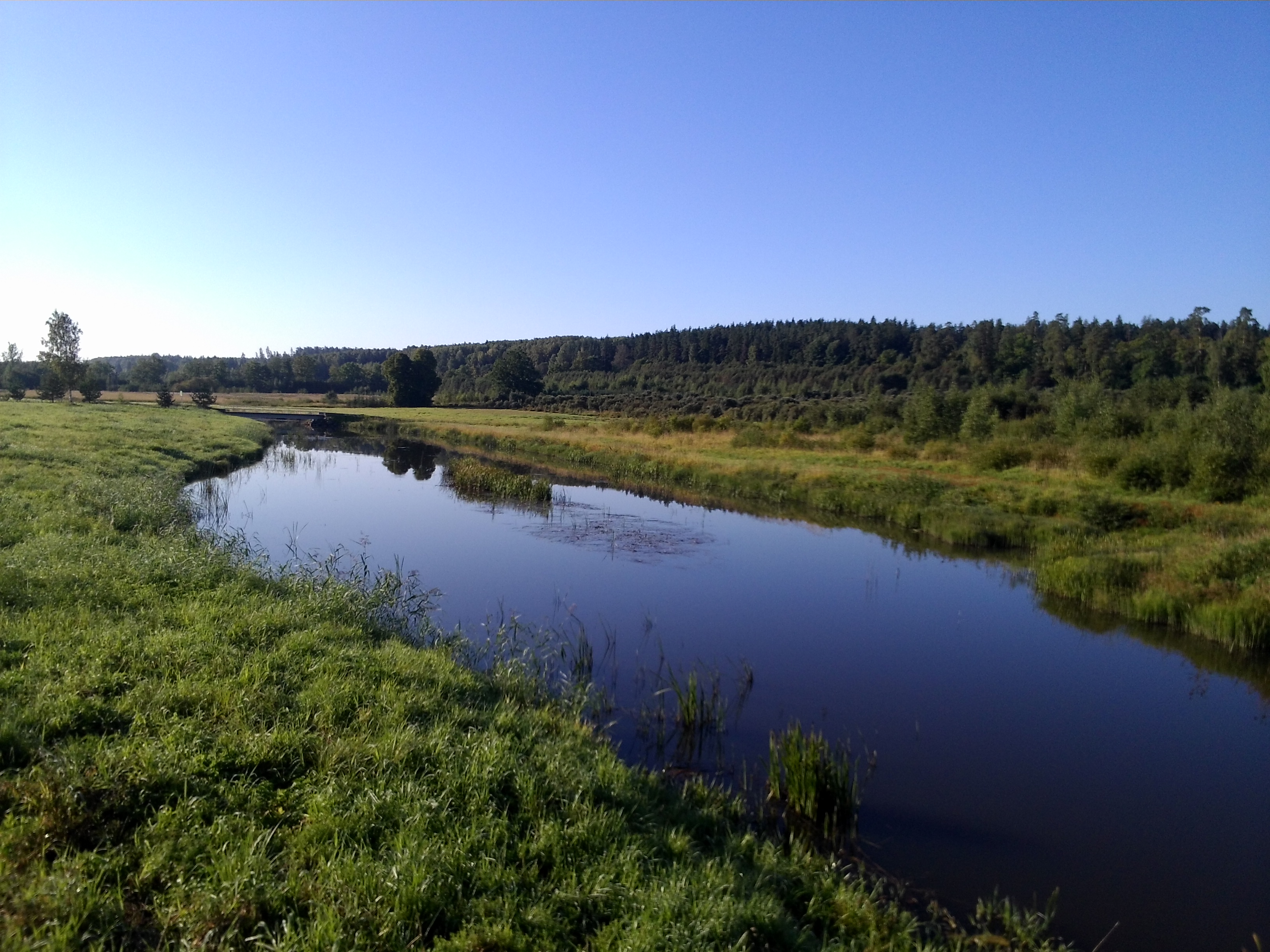
Kullavere River in Voore

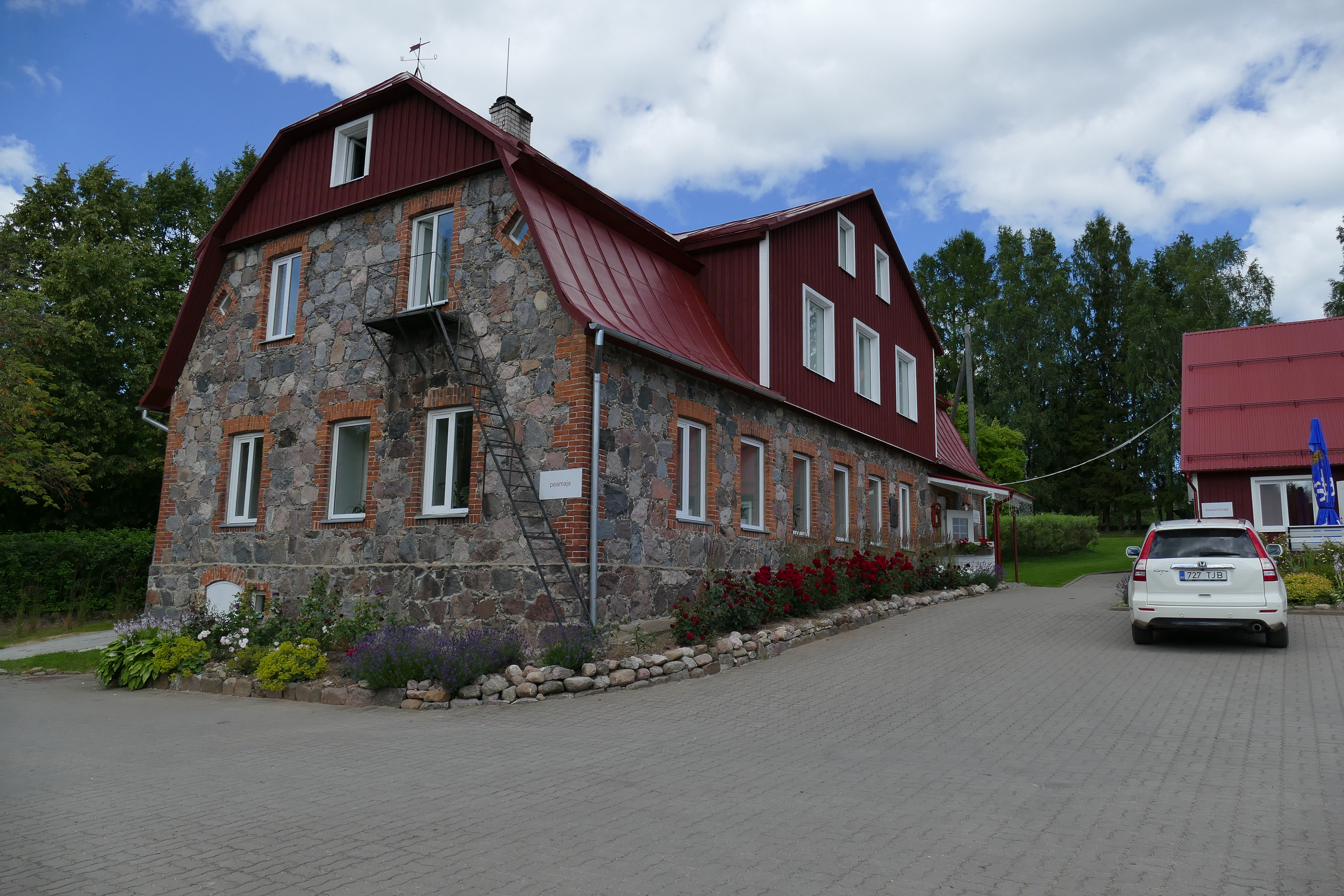
Voore Guesthouse, former primary school
