= Balta, Ukraine =

City in Odesa Oblast, Ukraine

Balta Балта
- City
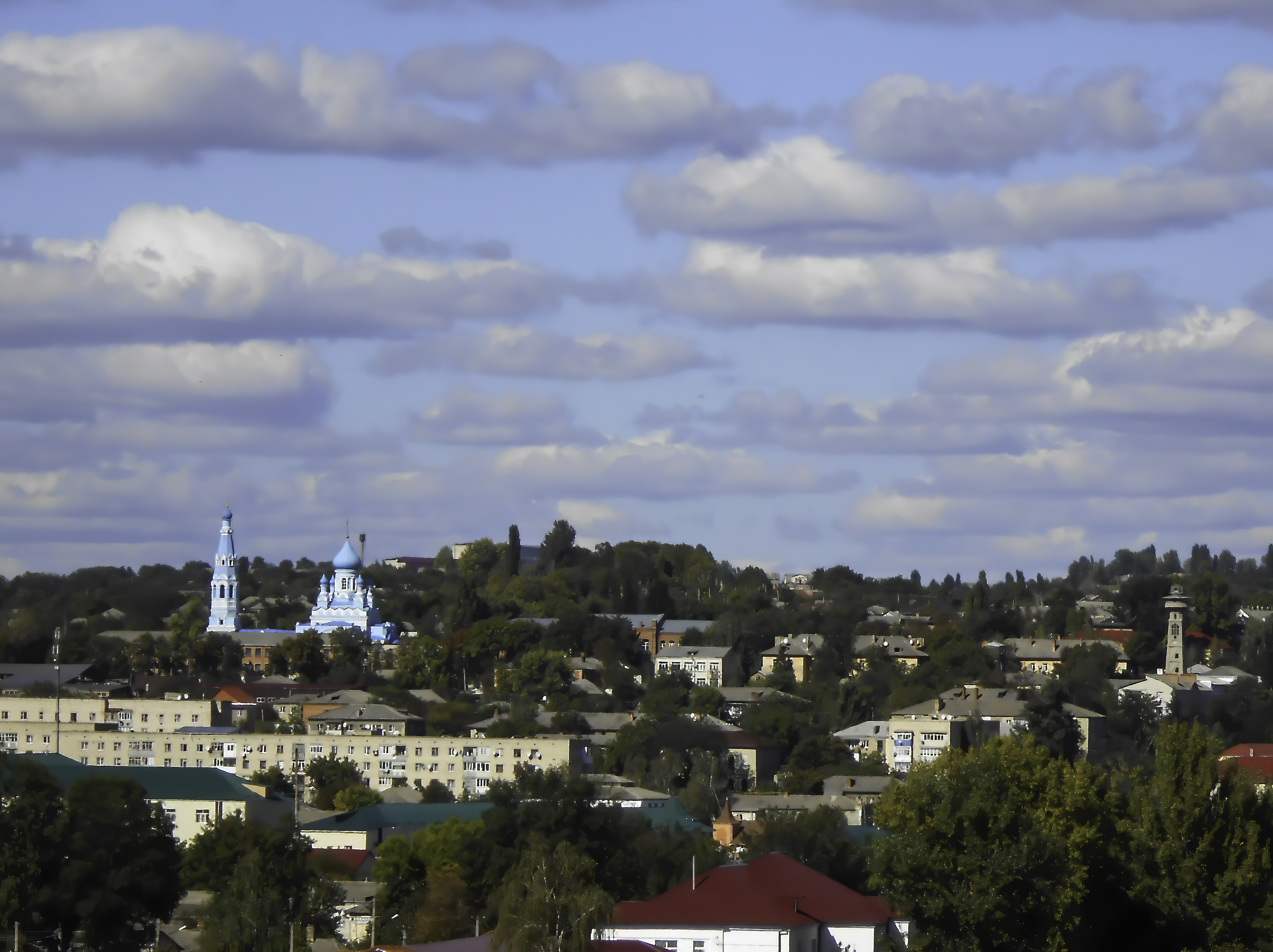
- The city view

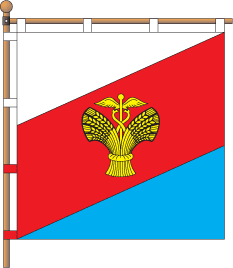
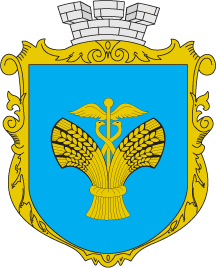
- Flag Coat of arms
- Interactive map of Balta
- Location of Balta in Odesa Oblast Balta (Odesa Oblast)
- Coordinates: 47°56′24″N 29°37′19″E
- Country: Ukraine
- Oblast: Odesa Oblast
- Raion: Podilsk Raion
- Hromada: Balta urban hromada
- Founded: 1526

Government
  - Mayor: Serhiy Mazur

Area
  - Total: 22.97 km^{2} (8.87 sq mi)
- Elevation: 23 m (75 ft)

Population (2022)
  - Total: 17,854 ▼
  - Density: 777.3/km^{2} (2,013/sq mi)
- Time zone: UTC+2 (EET)
  - Summer (DST): UTC+3 (EEST)
- Postal code: 66100—66105
- Area code: +380 4866

Balta (Ukrainian: Балта, pronounced [ˈbɑltɐ]; Romanian: Balta; Polish: Bałta; Yiddish: באַלטאַ) is a city in Podilsk Raion, Odesa Oblast in south-western Ukraine. It hosts the administration of Balta urban hromada, one of the hromadas of Ukraine. Population: 17,854 (2022 estimate). The city's population was 19,772 as of the 2001 Ukrainian Census.

== History ==
Historic coat of arms of Józefgród

The first mentions of Balta, a town on the right bank of the Kodyma River, go back to 1526. In the 18th century, Polish nobleman Józef Aleksander Lubomirski founded the border town of Józefgród, named after him, on the left bank of the Kodyma, opposite of Ottoman-ruled Balta. In 1768, a Polish unit of the Bar Confederation fled across the border to Ottoman-ruled Balta, followed by chasing Russian troops, who then burned the town, an event that sparked the Russo-Turkish War (1768–1774). In 1776, King Stanisław August Poniatowski vested Józefgród with town rights and established two annual fairs. It was a private town of the Lubomirski family, administratively located in the Bracław County in the Bracław Voivodeship in the Lesser Poland Province of the Kingdom of Poland.

Balta and Józefgród were annexed by Russia in 1791 and 1793, respectively. In 1797, Józefgród, by then renamed to Yelensk (Еленськ) and Balta were merged into one town, retaining the name of the latter. It is located in the historic Podolia region. According to the Russian census of 1897, with a population of 23,363 it was the fourth largest city of Podolia after Kamianets-Podilskyi, Uman and Vinnytsia. The town was known as a location major grain fairs. By 1880, 80% of its population consisted of Jews. In 1900, the city's Jewish population numbered 13,235.

Pogroms occurred in Balta in 1882 and 1905. In April 1920, Balta was the site of a battle fought by Kyiv and Black Zaporozhian divisions of the Ukrainian People's Army against the Bolsheviks.

From 1924–1929, the city was the capital of the Moldavian Autonomous Soviet Socialist Republic.

Until 2016, Balta was part of Balta Raion. On 4 February 2016, it was designated the city of oblast significance but remained the administrative center of the raion. It was incorporated as the center of Balta Municipality. The municipality was abolished in July 2020 as part of the administrative reform of Ukraine, which reduced the number of raions of Odesa Oblast to seven. The area of Balta Municipality was merged into Podilsk Raion.

=== World War II and the Holocaust ===
Balta was occupied by German and Romanian troops at the end of 4 August 1941 and became part of Transnistria Governorate in Kingdom of Romania until its recapture on 29 March 1944 by Red Army. German forces occupied Balta on 5 August 1941. Three days later, approximately 200 Jews, including about 60 residents of Balta and Jewish refugees from Bessarabia, were murdered near the village of Kazatskoye.

On 1 September 1941, Balta was incorporated into the Romanian-administered Transnistria Governorate. Romanian authorities subsequently brought Jewish deportees from Bessarabia and Bukovina to the city. In October 1941, a ghetto was established in an area of damaged houses and four public shelters on the outskirts of Balta. Approximately 4,000 Jews were initially confined there, including about 1,500 Jews from Balta, 1,000 Jews from elsewhere in the modern Odesa Oblast, and 1,500 deportees from pre-Operation München Romania. The ghetto was surrounded by barbed wire, and its inhabitants were required to wear a white Star of David.

A Jewish committee administered internal affairs in the ghetto and organized workshops and food distribution. Hundreds of inmates performed forced labour, including approximately 590 who worked in a local factory. Overcrowding and poor sanitation created a serious danger of epidemics. Between 19 November and 4 December 1941, Romanian authorities deported several groups numbering thousands of Jews on foot from Balta toward camps in German-controlled territory; most died during the marches or after reaching the camps. Hundreds of other Jews were taken by German authorities for forced labour, from which few returned.

Conditions improved somewhat during 1942 and 1943 following assistance from the Jewish relief committee in Bucharest, which helped establish a small hospital, pharmacy, bathhouse, disinfection facility and two orphanages. In spring 1943, 2,523 Jews were recorded in the Balta ghetto, in addition to approximately 400 Jews from Bershad and Obodivka who were working in a felt factory. Contemporary records compiled by Romanian authorities similarly document thousands of Jews confined in the ghetto and subjected to forced labour.

In November 1943, Romanian gendarmes shot 83 Jews from the ghetto after accusing them of supporting partisans. A further six Jewish members of a partisan group were executed in February 1944, and approximately 300 Jews were killed during the German retreat in March. Balta was recaptured by the Red Army on 29 March 1944.

== Population ==
Historical population
Year	Pop.	±%
1849	9,810	—
1860	14,154	+44.3%
1897	23,363	+65.1%
1959	17,922	−23.3%
1970	20,317	+13.4%
1979	20,929	+3.0%
1989	23,293	+11.3%
2001	19,962	−14.3%
2016	18,955	−5.0%

=== Ethnicity ===
Distribution of the population by ethnicity according to the 2001 Ukrainian census:

Ethnic composition of Balta
	percent
Ukrainians	82.74%
Russians	13.46%
Moldovans	1.70%
Ashkenazi Jews	0.56%
Belarusians	0.37%
Bulgarians	0.23%
Armenians	0.13%
Poles	0.10%
Georgians	0.09%

=== Language ===
Distribution of the population by native language according to the 2001 census:

Language	Percentage
Ukrainian	81.02%
Russian	17.41%
Romanian	0.98%
other/undecided	1.28%

== Notable people ==
- Aryeh Altman, Israeli politician
- Yuly Aykhenvald, Ukrainian Jewish literary critic
- Zellig Harris, American linguist, mathematical syntactician, and methodologist of science
- Vsevolod Holubovych, Prime Minister of the Ukrainian People's Republic
- Grigori Panteleimonov, Russian sport shooter who competed in the 1912 Summer Olympics
- Aryeh Leib Schochet, Rabbi
- Samuel (Sholem) Schwarzbard, (1886–1938), Yiddish poet, watchmaker, soldier, anarchist; grew up in Balta
- Louis E. Stern (b. 08/27/1886 d. 01/11/1962), American International Lawyer, patron and friend of Chagall, Picasso, Klee and Miro, collection left to Philadelphia Museum of Art and Brooklyn Museum
- Judah Even Shemuel
- Iosif Shkolnik, was a painter and set designer
- Alexander Veprik, composer and music educator
- David Palatnik (1913–1998), Moldavian architect
- Andrey Dolgokir (born 1953), Ukrainian bodybuilding pioneer and sports executive.
