= Stepan Ryabchenko =

Ukrainian artist (born 1987)

- Степан Рябченко
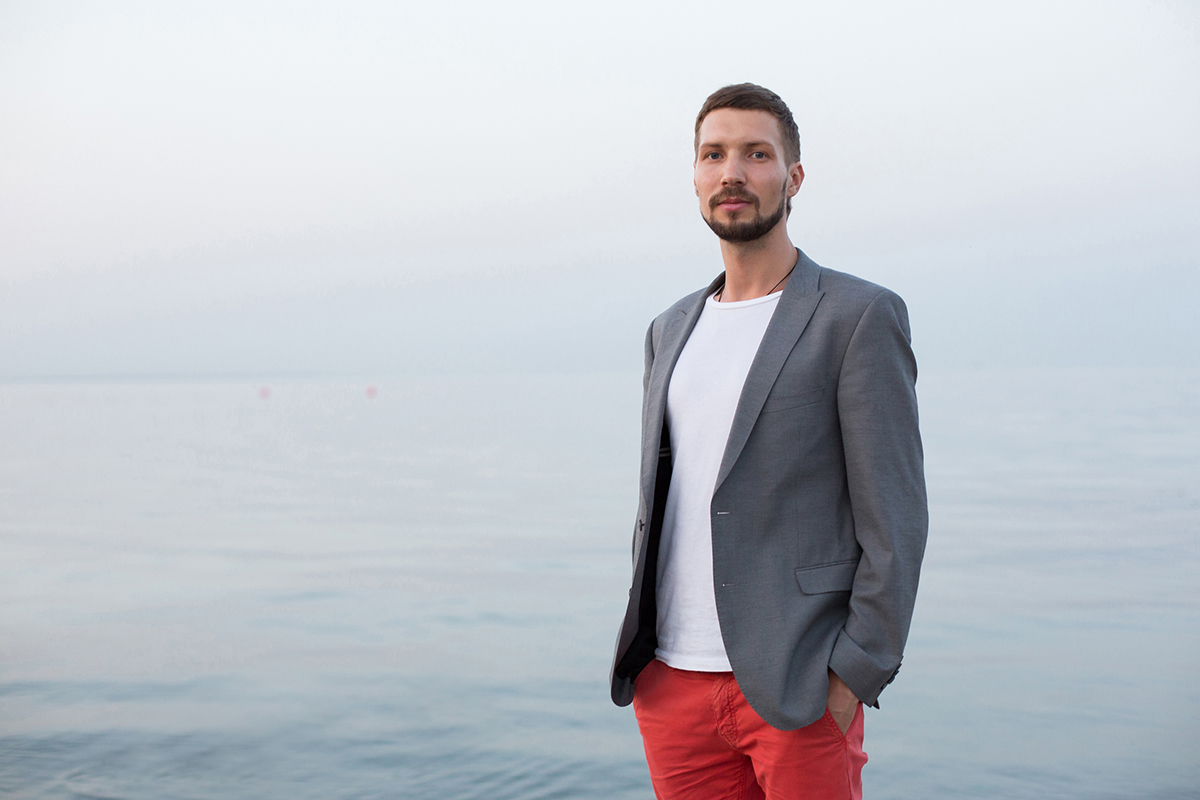
- Born: October 17, 1987 (age 38); Odesa, Ukraine
- Education: Odesa State Academy of Civil Engineering and Architecture
- Style: digital art, light art, conceptual architecture
- Movement: New media art

Stepan Vasyl'evych Ryabchenko (Ukrainian: Степан Васильевич Рябченко; born October 17, 1987) is a Ukrainian artist and one of the leading figures in new media art. His work includes digital art, conceptual architecture, sculpture, graphics, photographic art and light installations. In his artwork, the artist creates his own digital universe with its heroes and mythology. Known for his monumental prints, sculptures and video-art installations of non-existent characters, including Virtual Flowers, Electronic Winds, Computer Viruses, etc.

== Biography ==
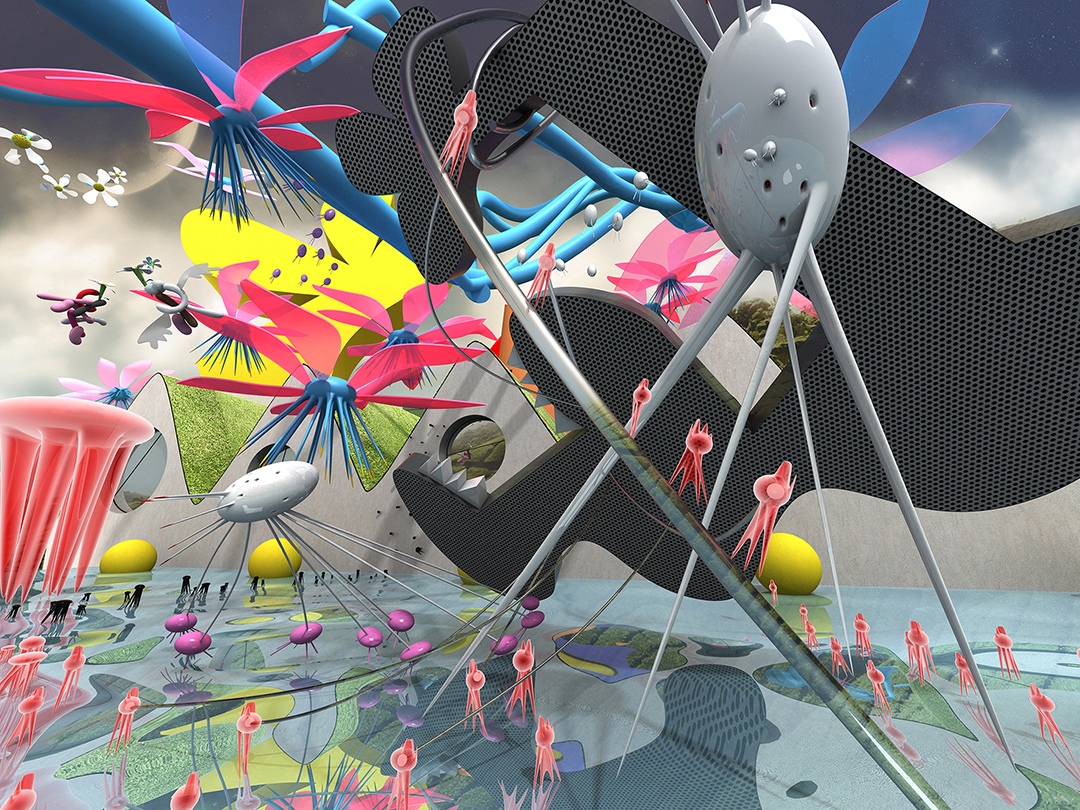
Stepan Ryabchenko, "The Temptation of St. Anthony" (2010)

Stepan Ryabchenko was born on October 17, 1987, in Odesa, in a family of artists. His father, Vasiliy Ryabchenko, is one of the key figures in contemporary Ukrainian art, and the New Ukrainian Wave; Stepan's grandfather, Sergey Ryabchenko, was a Soviet and Ukrainian graphic artist.

Ryabchenko graduated from the Odesa State Academy of Civil Engineering and Architecture in 2011 with a master's degree in Architecture.

At the end of 2015, he was included in Forbes magazine’s “30 Under 30” list.

From 2020, Stepan Ryabchenko is the chief curator of the Art Laboratory creative organization, where he also conceived and curated Strange Time — a major international exhibition in virtual space, launched on May 7, 2020, during the COVID-19 lockdown.

In 2020, the artist represented Ukraine at the International Changwon Sculpture Biennale in South Korea.

In 2021, he was included in the list of the best digital artists in the world. In the same year represented Ukraine at the Expo 2020 in Dubai.

In July 2025, Stepan Ryabchenko was elected a corresponding member of the Fine Arts Department of the National Academy of Arts of Ukraine. He became the youngest member of the Academy's current composition and its only representative from Odesa.

Lives and works in Odesa.

== Work ==
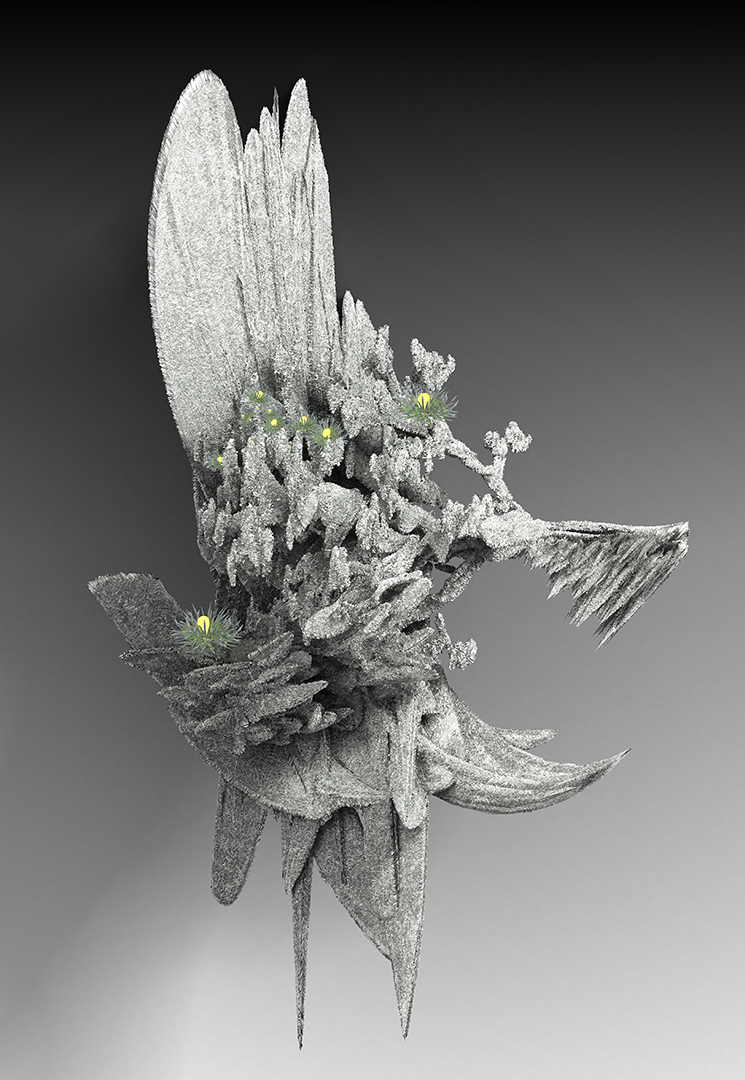
Stepan Ryabchenko, "Chernobyl". From the "Computer Viruses" series (2011)

Stepan Ryabchenko uses a broad range of computer software and digital technologies to create large-scale digital prints, animations, sculptures, light installations, and videos representing his own digital universe, populated with fictional characters, surrealistic plant and animal forms, and visualizations of computer viruses. His visual language, which moves between abstract and figurative forms, explores people's relationships to virtual spaces and the natural environment.

== About the Artist ==
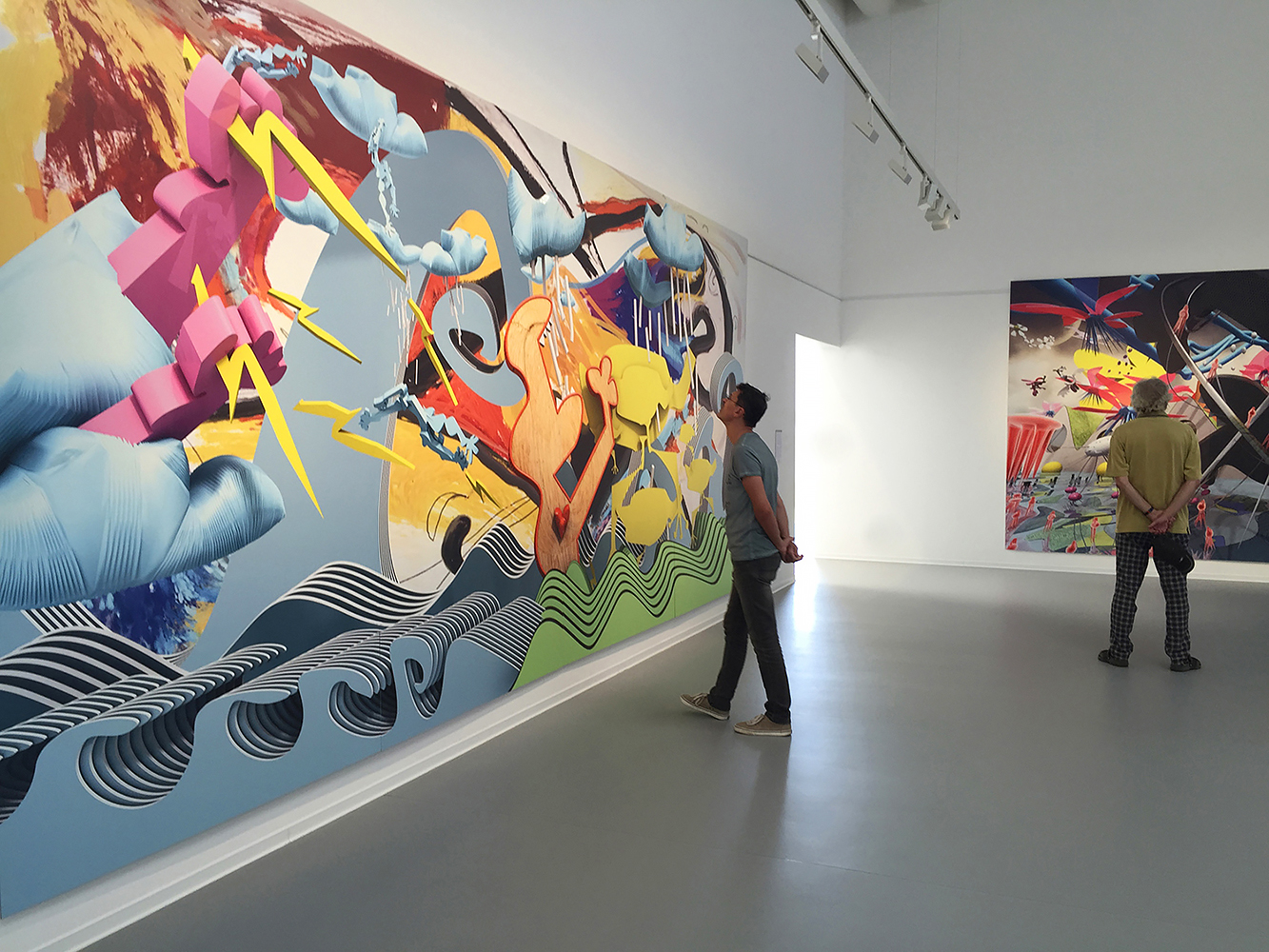
Works by Stepan Ryabchenko at the 3rd Danube Biennale in the Danubiana-Meulensteen Art Museum

"The work of Odessa artist Stepan Ryabchenko belongs to those phenomena that shape the space of contemporary Ukrainian art and determine its scope and intentions. The aesthetics of new media art, the field in which the artist works, not only open up new dimensions of creativity but also require special qualities from the artist: imagination, a sense of space, and those “metamorphoses of the image” that reveal and visualize strange connections between the real and the virtual, the real and the fictional. It is no coincidence that one of the topics that fascinates the artist is “new nature,” where myths and fictions intersect with impressions of the surrounding world and other, unexpected projections of it."

Galyna Sklyarenko, art historian, curator

"Stepan Ryabchenko uses computer graphics for a body of work balancing between the digital format and physical forms. He deals with contemporary heroism and classical mythology. He creates large-size digital prints representing a self-constructed universe featuring monumental heroes in brightly coloured compositions that combine figurative and abstract futuristic language. In another work group, he researches digital anti-heroism by developing a physical representation for the purely digital form of a virus – the face of a computer virus."

Bjorn Geldhof, art historian, curator

== Exhibitions ==
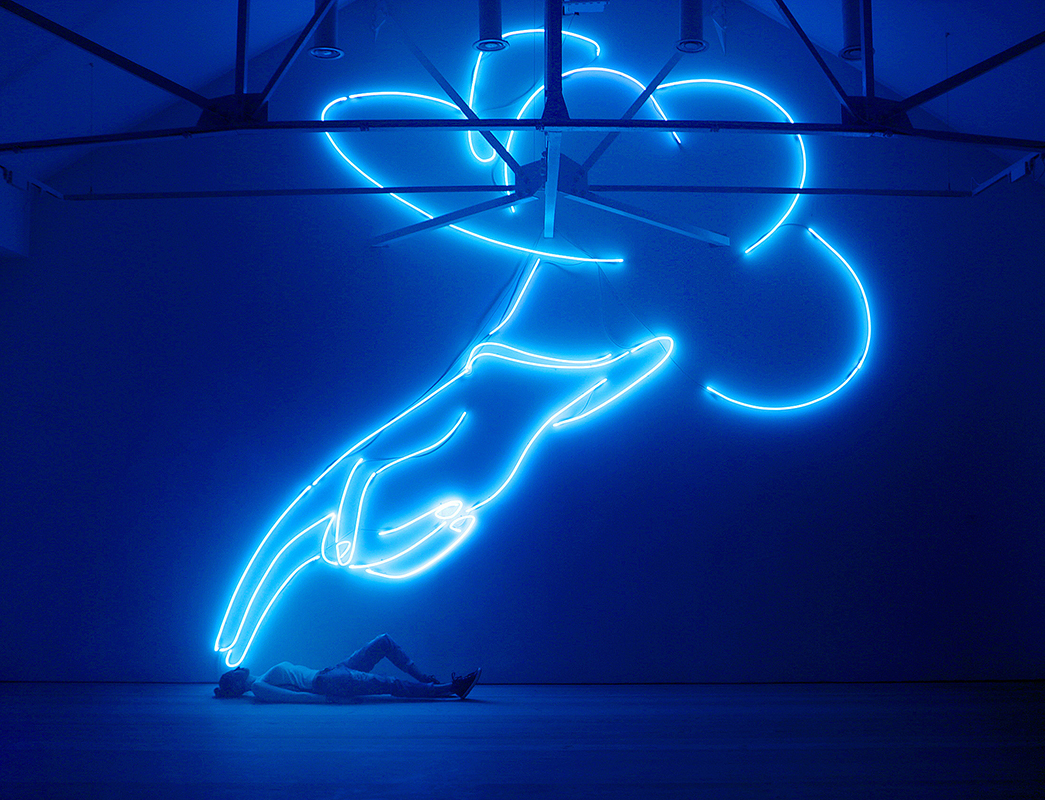
The Blessing Hand by Stepan Ryabchenko in Saatchi Gallery

Stepan Ryabchenko's works have been exhibited at the Ludwig Museum in Budapest, Albertina Modern in Vienna, Moderna galerija in Ljubljana, Art & History Museum in Brussels, MAXXI in Rome, Saatchi Gallery in London, Krolikarnia in Warsaw, Museum of Contemporary Art in Zagreb, Danubiana Meulensteen Art Museum in Bratislava, Art Centre Silkeborg Bad in Silkeborg, Manege and Gostiny Dvor in Moscow, Ars Electronica, etc. His works have also been exhibited in many places in Ukraine, including PinchukArtCentre, Mystetskyi Arsenal, National Art Museum, Odesa Museum of Western and Eastern Art, National Cultural Center "Ukrainian House", M17 Contemporary Art Center, National Academy of Arts of Ukraine, etc.

== Collections ==
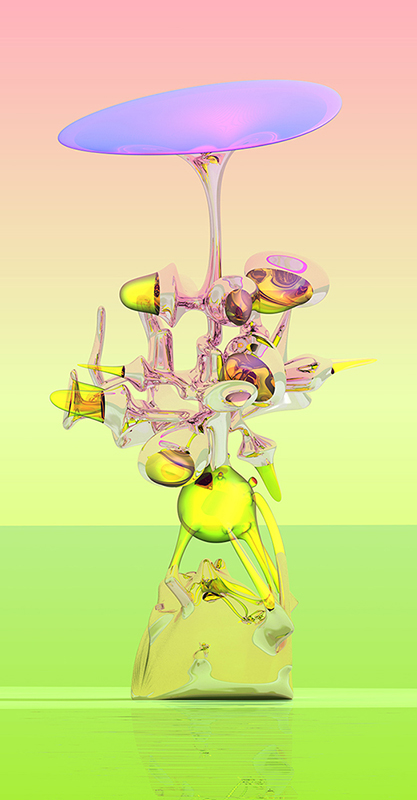
Stepan Ryabchenko, "Alchemicus Redolent". From the "Virtual Garden" series (2016). From the Odesa Fine Arts Museum collection

=== Public collections ===
- Art Collection Telekom, Bonn, Germany
- Danubiana Meulensteen Art Museum, Bratislava, Slovakia
- M17 Contemporary Art Center, Kyiv, Ukraine
- National Academy of Arts of Ukraine, Kyiv, Ukraine
- Odesa Fine Arts Museum, Odesa, Ukraine
- Museum of Odesa Modern Art, Odesa, Ukraine
- Cherkasy Art Museum, Cherkasy, Ukraine
- Museum of Contemporary Ukrainian Art Korsakiv, Lutsk, Ukraine
- Contemporary Sculpture Park PARK3020, Strilky village (Lviv region), Ukraine

== Awards ==
- 2010 winner of the Art-Act, the 1st All-Ukrainian Triennial of Abstract Art
- 2012 winner of "Special Prize" at the Kyiv Sculpture Project
- 2019 winner of sculpture competition for the Odesa International Airport
- 2022 winner of the Mikhail Bozhyi Art Prize in the Monumental Art nomination

== Bibliography ==
- Alisa Lozhkina. The Art of Ukraine // Thames and Hudson. – 2024. – p. 239 — ISBN 978-0-500-29778-0.
- Galina Sklyarenko. Black Flowers by Stepan Ryabchenko // Obrazotvorche Mystetstvo. – No. 3-4. – 2024. – p. 54 – 59 – ISSN 0130-1799.
- Anastasia Sukhanov. “Freedom is the ability to creatively shape your life.” Interview with new media artist Stepan Ryabchenko // .ART Odyssey Magazine: Navigating the Future of Art – 2023. – p. 54-61 — ISBN 979-8-8631-3701-8.
- Dmitry Gorbachev, Valentyn Sokolovsky. Art of the World. Ukraine's Contribution // Bykhun. – 2022. – p. 674, 675, 683 — ISBN 978-617-7699-14-8.
- Volodymyr Petrashyk. Digital Universe by Stepan Ryabchenko // Obrazotvorche Mystetstvo. – No. 2.– 2020. – p. 92 – 95 — ISSN 0130-1799.
- Mohamed Benhadj. Stepan Ryabchenko // Al-Tiba9 Art Magazine ISSUE06. – 2020. – p. 76 – 83 — ISSN 2696-2497.
- Victoria Burlaka. Post-media optics. Ukrainian version // ArtHuss. – 2019. – p. 232 – 239, 392 – 399 — ISBN 978-617-7799-13-8.
- Permanent Revolution. Ukrainian Art Today // Ludwig Múzeum - Kortárs Művészeti Múzeum. – 2018. – p. 164 – 165 — ISBN 978-963-9537-62-0.
- Art WORK // Galeria Miejska we Wrocławiu – 2017. – p. 92 – 93 — ISBN 78-83-946219-3-3.
- Premonition. Ukrainian Art Now // Booth-Clibborn Editions – 2014. – p. 92 – 93 — ISBN 978-1-86154-369-1.
- Contemporary Ukrainian Artists // Saatchi Gallery – 2013. – p. 61-63
- Great and Grand // Mystetskyi Arsenal – 2013. – p. 160-161
- Galina Sklyarenko, Oksana Barshinova. Myth “Ukrainian Baroque” // National Art Museum of Ukraine – 2012. – p. 153, 154-155
- Arsenale. Renaissance and Apocalypse in Contemporary Art // Mystetskyi Arsenal – 2012. – p. 72-73
- Kyiv Sculpture Project. The First International Festival of Contemporary Sculpture // "Profi" – 2012. – p. 75-79 — ISBN 978-966-2398-03-8.
- Restart // Dymchuk Art Promotion – 2009. – p. 53-54
