= Andrey Dolgokir =

Ukrainian bodybuilding pioneer, coach, and official

- Andrey Dolgokir

Personal information
- Born: Andrey Ivanovich Dolgokir; June 14, 1953 (age 73) Balta, Odesa Oblast, Ukrainian SSR, Soviet Union
- Occupations: Bodybuilding executive, sports official, coach
- Years active: 1992–present
- Height: 185 cm (6 ft 1 in)
- Weight: 100 kg (220 lb) (competition)

Sport
- Country: Ukraine
- Sport: Bodybuilding, powerlifting

Andrey Ivanovich Dolgokir (Андрій Іванович Долгокір; Андрей Иванович Долгокир; born 14 June 1953), also transliterated from Ukrainian as Andriy Dolhokir, is a Ukrainian bodybuilding pioneer, sports executive, and coach. He is a co-founder of both the Ukrainian and European Bodybuilding and Fitness Federations, the first president of the National Bodybuilding and Fitness Federation of Ukraine (FBBU), an International Category Referee (Class A), and an Honored Coach of Ukraine.

== Biography ==
Andrey Dolgokir was born on 14 June 1953 in Balta, Odesa Oblast.

He stands as one of the key figures in the development of athletic sports behind the Iron Curtain and later in independent Ukraine, working alongside IFBB founder Ben Weider to promote the sport in Eastern Europe. On 16 June 1995, he was officially certified as an International Category Referee (Class A) by the IFBB.

In 1992, Dolgokir co-founded the National Bodybuilding and Fitness Federation of Ukraine (FBBU) and served as its inaugural president, leading the organization for 16 years until 2008, after which he was named its Honorary President.

In May 2025, Dolgokir donated a rare collection of historic artifacts, archives, and sports memorabilia chronicling the rise of Ukrainian bodybuilding to the Zaporizhzhia Regional Local Lore Museum. On 12 June 2026, the museum officially opened Ukraine's first permanent bodybuilding exhibition, titled "More Than Strength — The Athletic Era of Andrey Dolgokir" in his honor.

In June 2026, IFBB President Rafael Santonja officially announced the inauguration of the Andrey Dolgokir Memorial Hall. In the official press release, Dolgokir was recognized as a distinguished athlete, the founding President of the Ukrainian federation, and a key executive official of the international federation.

== Awards and honors ==
- Order of Merit, 3rd class (2026) – Awarded by Decree of the President of Ukraine No. 532/2026 on the occasion of Constitution Day for significant personal contributions to strengthening Ukrainian statehood, courage, and dedication shown in defending national sovereignty.
- Honored Worker of Physical Culture and Sports of Ukraine (2016) – Awarded by Decree of the President of Ukraine No. 391/2016 on the occasion of the Day of Physical Culture and Sports.
- Honored Coach of Ukraine
- Cross of Freedom Medal (2023) – Awarded by Metropolitan Epiphanius of the Orthodox Church of Ukraine (Medal No. 705) for his church and social merits.
- Ministry of Defense of Ukraine Commendation (2023) – Awarded by the Commander of Military Unit T0910, Colonel Lyubomyr Yakibchuk, for patriotism, volunteering, and humanitarian assistance during the Russian invasion of Ukraine.
