= Odesa State Academy of Civil Engineering and Architecture =

University in Odesa, Ukraine

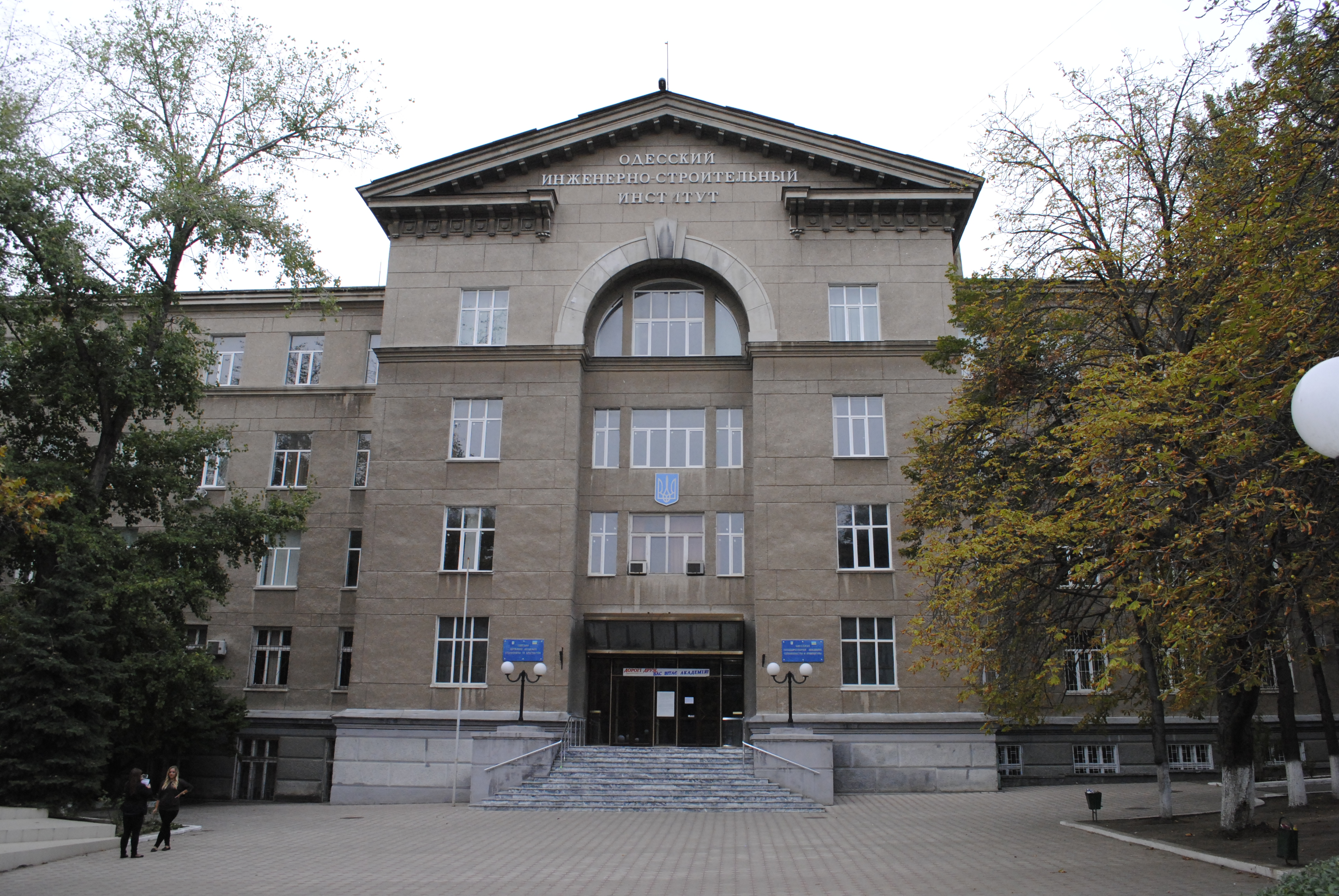

The Odesa State Academy of Civil Engineering and Architecture, was a higher education establishment founded in 1930 as part of the Ukrainian education system. Since 1991 The Academy has been a member of the European and International Association of Universities, and in 2007 it signed the Bologna Convention. The Academy's education process is carried out according to the multilevel system: Bachelor - Specialist - Master.

== Notable alumni ==
- Igor Chepusov (1950–2011), Ukrainian Soviet and American film producer and broadcaster
- Georgy Deliev (born 1960), actor and musician
- Volodymyr Kistion (born 1965), biochemist and politician
- Stepan Ryabchenko (born 1987), Ukrainian artist, sculptor, architect
- David Palatnik (1913–1998), Moldovan architect
