= Maardla =

Village in Estonia

- Village
- Location in Estonia
- Coordinates: 58°42′23″N 26°41′52″E
- Country: Estonia
- County: Jõgeva County
- Municipality: Mustvee Parish

Population (2011)
  - Total: 31

Maardla is a village in Mustvee Parish, Jõgeva County in Estonia. It's located about 7 km (4 mi) east of Palamuse, just southwest of Voore. Maardla has a population of 31 (as of 2011).

Actor Leonhard Merzin (1934–1990) was born in Aruküla village which is now part of Maardla village.
