= David Palatnik =

Moldovan architect (1913–1998)

David Izrailevich Palatnik (Russian: Давид Израилевич Палатник, 1 November 1913 in Balta, Podolia Governorate – 1998, Chișinău, Moldova) was Moldavian Soviet architect, an honored architect of the Moldavian SSR (1985).

== Biography ==
After graduating from Odesa Construction College in 1932, and Odesa Civil Engineering Institute in 1939, from 1940 he worked in Chișinău. He found work designing buildings with the construction bureau "Dorproekt", on the Odesa-Chișinău railway. From 1955 to 1993 he worked at the "Moldgiprostroy" design institute, where he was head of the Architecture and Construction Department № 2.

Palatnik designed a number of schools, preschools and maternity hospitals of the city, using elements of Moldavian folk architecture and local materials such as limestone. Among his works are the City Theatre and Theatre Square (1936) in Tiraspol, and the railway hospital (1954), Riscani Palace of Culture (1971), the 17th Railway School (now the lyceum "Minerva"), and 16-storey complex of three residences on Kuibyshev Street (now Calea Ieșilor), in Chișinău. During the demolition of the historic Jewish cemetery in Chișinău in 1959, he was one of the surveyors of the tombstones. He died in 1998. An exhibition was held at the National Museum of Archeology and History of Moldova in February 2014 commemorating his centenary.
