= Georgy Deliev =

Ukrainian actor and musician (born 1960)

Heorhiy Deliev
- Георгій Делієв
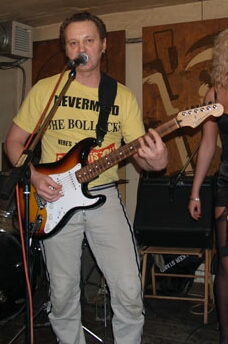
- Deliev in February 2008
- Born: Heorhiy Viktorovych Deliev; 1 January 1960 (age 66); Kherson, Ukrainian SSR, Soviet Union (now Ukraine)
- Education: Odesa State Academy of Civil Engineering and Architecture
- Occupations: Actor and musician
- Years active: 1986–present
- Spouse(s): Larysa Pudovska (m. 1979; died 2012) Kateryna Deliyeva
- Parents: Viktor Heorgiyovych Deliev (father); Halyna Trokhimivna Hulina (mother)
- Awards: see here

Heorhiy Viktorovych Deliev (Note: Ukrainian: Гео́ргій Ві́кторович Делі́єв) (born 1 January 1960) is a Ukrainian actor, artist and musician. In 2002, he received the title of Merited Artist of Ukraine, and awarded the People's Artist of Ukraine in 2009. Additionally during the early part of the 1990s, he led the comedy company "Masks" from Odesa, whose TV shows dominated Russian and Ukrainian television.

Deliev is an architect by training, is skilled in fine art, but his paintings stand out because of his distinct and funny worldview. Works created using a variety of media (oil, acrylic, watercolor, mascara, pastel) and executed in the style of experimental drawing are kept in museums and private collections as well as displayed in exhibition halls.

== Early life and education ==
Born on 1 January 1960, in the Ukrainian city of Kherson. Deliev attended the Odesa State Academy of Civil Engineering and Architecture's Faculty of Architecture from 1977 to 1982. He was extensively involved in pantomime and clowning while he was a student. He worked as an architect in Pyatigorsk from 1982 to 1984 before moving to Chișinău, where he simultaneously established pantomime theaters and studios.

== Career ==
Under Vyacheslav Polunin's direction, Deliev joined the Leningrad Theater's "Lycedy" cast in 1984. He was admitted into the Odesa Philharmonic Theater's pantomime and clowning group "Masks" that same year. He continues to serve as artistic director, director, actor, and screenwriter for the independent comic strip "Masks" at this time. between 1986 and 1989. He attended the State Institute of Theater Arts' Stage Directing Faculty.

Сім днів з російською красунею is a feature film that Deliev filmed in 1991. Along with acting in several Kira Muratova films, he won the best male part in the movie The Tuner at the Stozhary 2005 film festival. Ostap Bender in Ulrike Ottinger's German feature film Zwölf Stühle (Twelve Chairs) and the lead in the Ukrainian comedy film Прикольна казка (2008) were the roles he performed.

Deliev was chosen as an Odesa City Council representative in 2002 and joined the Commission on Culture, Youth, and Sports. He and well-known Ukrainian vocalist Alena Vinnitskaya had a fruitful collaboration. The pair took home the Song of the Year 2006 title. Guitarist, singer, and songwriter Deliev is a member of the rock group Master Class. He has been working on his next project, releasing the albums Хулиган с большой буквьі (2005), Дубда (2007), and Небесньїй поезд (2008).

As of 2016, Deliev is performing with the band Master Class around the states and cities of Ukraine. His music is played on several Ukrainian radio stations, and his videos are broadcast on top Russian and Ukrainian networks. He performs live at every shows, playing a variety of unusual musical instruments as he goes. He has been a member of the League of Laughter's jury since 2017. In 2018, he acted as the field leader of the DPR in several movies, notably Serhii Loznytsia's Donbass.

== Controversies ==
=== Ukrainophobia ===
Deliev was chosen to serve as an Odesa City Council deputy in 2002. He demonstrated a steadfast opposition to the Orange Revolution's principles both during and after it, which developed into a similarly steadfast Ukrainophobia. In 2006, the song and video clip Рідна мова was released, becoming a popular online resource. This was the expression of the latter. In the video, he attempts to sing in Russian, but is repeatedly interrupted by two hefty guys wearing dark glasses—which, incidentally, stand in for the "repressive orange regime"—who insist that he sing in Ukrainian.

=== Ridiculing the Ukrainian language ===
Deliev made fun of the Ukrainian language in a music video titled Рідна мова that was recorded in 2006. Many Ukrainian observers denounced his behavior and accused him of being anti-Ukrainian once the video appeared. He responded to criticism by claiming that the tape was only the rough version that was broadcast on the network and later defended it by referring to it as dedicated to the artificial trend of the split of society on language issues. Afterwards, the publication The Ukrainian Weekly listed him as one of the top ten biggest xenophobes of 2011.

=== 2014 Annexation of Crimea ===
Deliev really legitimized the Russian Federation's pseudo-referendum in an interview he did in 2014, following the annexation of Crimea and the start of the Russo-Ukrainian war. According to him, Russia "perhare to have taken Crimea correctly." According to him, the conflict was sparked by the spiritless West's desire for Russia and Ukraine to fall apart. Later on, he said that Crimea was only "peacefully given" to Russia in exchange for cash, even if he was personally opposed to it. Regarding politics, he talked hesitantly since he thought that "the artist should be neutral, carry universal values, and not incite aggression." The artist thought at the time that the conflict could only be ended by the Russian Orthodox Church. He asserted in an interview with 2021 that he did not regard Ukraine as a sovereign nation.

=== 2022 Russian Invasion of Ukraine ===
Following the commencement of Russia's invasion of Ukraine, Deliev refrained from disclosing his views on the situation in his nation. He also refrained from discussing whether or not his views on Russia's accountability, the annexation of Crimea, and the collective guilt of Russians had changed. He claimed in an interview with the website Nerkhomi that he moved to France from Ukraine with his family. Even after visiting Odesa in September 2022, Deliev remained silent on the conflict.

== Personal life ==
Larisa Pudovska was his first wife who died in 2012; during their union, their daughter Yana was born. Deliev later married Kateryna, and together they have two sons, Mykola and Luka. His family currently lives in a house in the Paris suburbs after living in a communal flat at first. Viktor Deliev, his father, made his support for Ukraine much clearer by calling on Ukrainians to return to their mother tongue, discussed the crimes that Russia had carried out in Ukraine, and discussed the violent Russification of the country back in 2021.

== Filmography ==
Year	Title	Roles	Notes
1991	7 dney s russkoy krasavitsey	Furich	as director and writer
2004	Zwölf Stühle	Ostap Bender	season 1; episode 1 and 2
2004	The Tuner	Tuner Andrey	
1991–2006	Maski Show	Himself	as director and creator
2008	An Awesome Tale	Military Minister	
2009	Malakholnaya	Otets Nadi	
2011	Shabbat	Mark Solomonovich Bogoyavlenskiy	as voice actor
2017	Odesskiy podkidysh	Arkasha	as director and adaptor
2018	Donbass	Batyana	
2020	Beglyanka 2	Nikolay Trenyov	
2020	Cossacks	Russian Tsar	season 1; episode 1 and 12
2022	Liubov i blohery	Agro Baron	
2023	Krai riky	Heorhii Deliev	

== Awards and recognitions ==
Deliev's animosity against the "Ukrainizers" did not stop the same Viktor Yushchenko from granting the artist the title of People's Artist of Ukraine in August 2009. He is also the winner of the All-Union Pop Artists Competition, as well as a laureate and certificate from several international theater, circus, and television festivals and competitions. He has been given the following membership and awards:

- People's Artist of Ukraine (2009)
- Merited Artist of Ukraine (2002)
- Academician of the International Academy of Tricks (2005)
- Member of the Union of Theater Figures
- Member of the Union of Cinematographers of Ukraine

Award	Year	Category	Nominated work	Result
Stozhary Film Festival	2005	Best Actor	The Tuner	Won
