= Nina Ilyina =

Ukrainian film actress (born 1951)

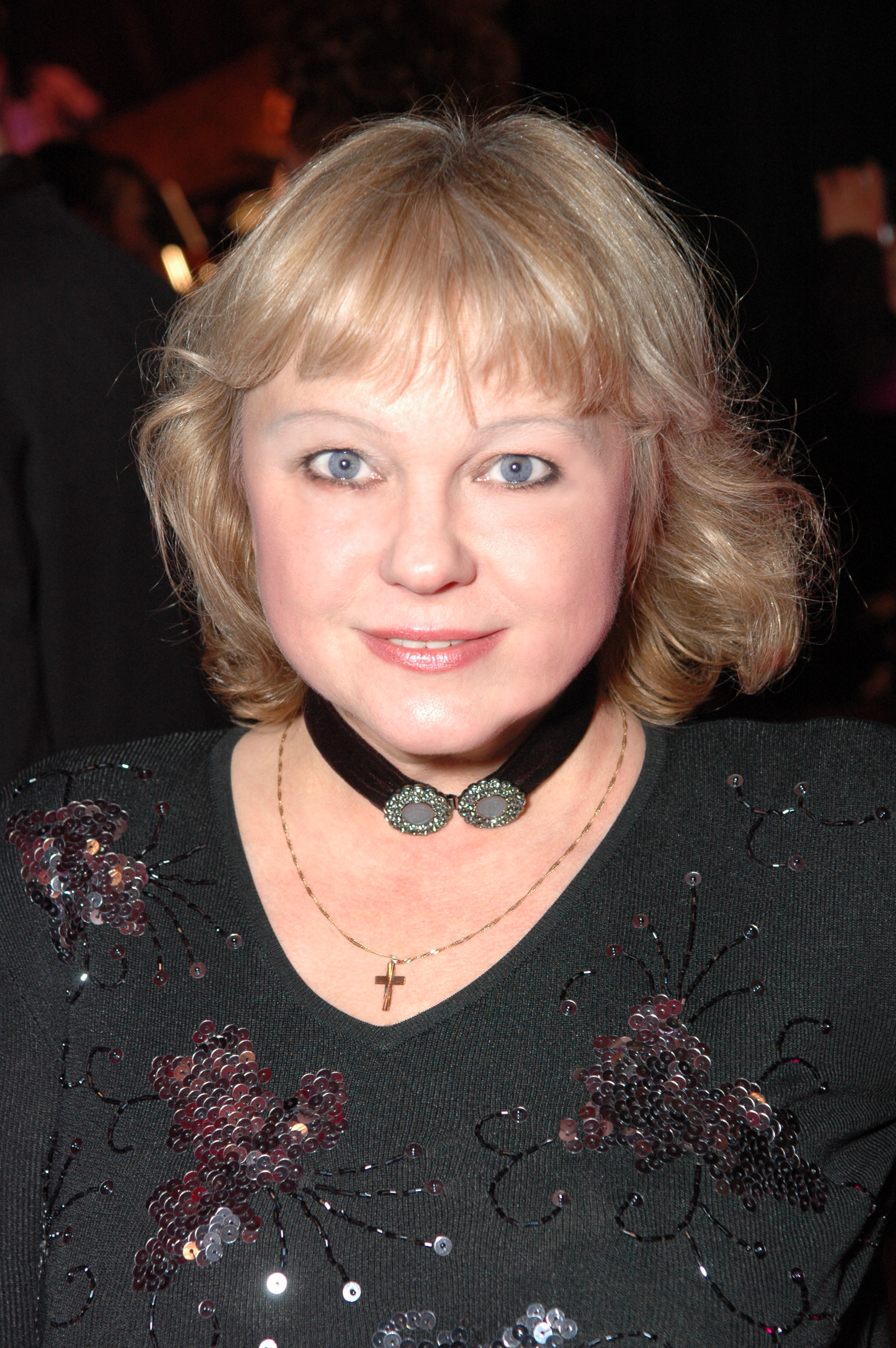
Nina Ilyina

Nina Oleksandrivna Ilyina (Ukrainian: Ніна Олександрівна Ільїна; born 30 August 1951) is a Ukrainian film actress and public figure. Merited Artist of Ukraine (2000). President of the International Festival of Film Actors "Stozhary." General director of the acting agency of the National Ukrainian Association of Cinematographers "Guild of Cinematographers."

== Early life and education ==
Nina Ilyina was born on 30 August 1951 in Kyiv. In 1968, she graduated from secondary school No. 108 in Kyiv. From 1958 to 1968, Ilyina studied at the studio of the artistic word of the Kyiv Palace of Pioneers. She continued her education at the acting faculty of the All-Union State Institute of Cinematography in Moscow, majoring in drama and film acting (1968-1972). There, Ilyina completed a Ukrainian workshop commissioned by the Ministry of Culture of Ukraine under the leadership of People's Artist of the USSR Volodymyr Belokurov. She received a diploma with honors.

== Career ==
From 1972 to 2006, Ilyina worked as an actress at the Dovzhenko Film Studio in Kyiv. Since 1977, she has been a member of the National Ukrainian Association of Cinematographers. From 1989 to 1999, Ilyina was a president of the Professional Guild of Film Actors of Ukraine.

In 1995, she founded the International Festival of Film Actors "Stozhary", held in Kyiv every two years: 1995, 1997, 1999, 2003, and 2005. Ilyina was the president, general director, producer, and author of the festival. Since 1999, she has been a general director of the acting agency of the National Ukrainian Association of Cinematographers "Film Actors' Guild" (Kyiv).

In 2008, Ilyina became an associate professor of the Department of Theater Arts of Kyiv International University. From 2009 to 2012, she was a head of the Department of Theater Faculty of Kyiv International University. From 2010 to 2018, Ilyina was a professor and director of the Educational and Scientific Institute of Television, Cinema and Theater of Kyiv International University. In 2016 and 2019, she presided and directed the All-Ukrainian Youth Festival of Film and Theater Creativity "Stars That Will Rise Tomorrow."

In 2017, Ilyina became a member of the Ukrainian Film Academy public organization and an International Embassy of Women Entrepreneurs Ambassador. From 2018 to 2021, she was a director of the Educational and Scientific Institute of Theater Arts at "Kyiv International University." Since 2021, Ilyina has been a professor of the Department of Performing Arts of the Educational and Scientific Institute of Theater and Musical Arts of Kyiv International University.

== Awards and honors ==
- Certificate of Honor of the Presidium of the Verkhovna Rada of the Belarusian SSR (1976)
- Medal "For Distinguished Labour" (1981)
- Merited Artist of Ukraine (2000)
- Order of Nestor the Chronicler (Ukrainian Orthodox Church, 2003)
- Honorary Diploma of the Verkhovna Rada of Ukraine (For special services to the Ukrainian people, 2006)

== Selected filmography ==
- Racers (1972)
- Captain Nemo (1975)
- The Trust That Went Bust (1982)
- Hard to Be a God (1989)
- Muhtar's Return, season 5, episode 93 (2010), season 7, episode 1 (2011)
