= Leonhard Merzin =

Estonian and Soviet actor

- Born: 10 February 1934; Aruküla, Kudina Parish (now Maardla, Mustvee Parish)
- Died: 2 January 1990 (aged 55); Tartu, then part of Estonian SSR, Soviet Union
- Occupation: Actor
- Years active: 1964–1986
- Children: 3, including Helena Merzin-Tamm

Leonhard Merzin (Russian: Леонха́рд Ри́хардович Ме́рзин); 10 February 1934 in Aruküla, Kudina Parish (now Maardla, Mustvee Parish) – 2 January 1990 in Tartu) was an Estonian theatre and film actor, one of the Estonian actors active in the Soviet Union and abroad. He played in more than 50 films. His most notable role in Estonia is "Teacher Laur" in Spring (Kevade) and as Edgar in Soviet Union adaption of King Lear (Korol Lir).

== Biography ==
From 1952 to 1954 Merzin studied at the Tartu Art School and in 1969 he graduated from the Viljandi School of Cultural Education.

Merzin also tried hand as a painter, mostly depicting nature and flowers.

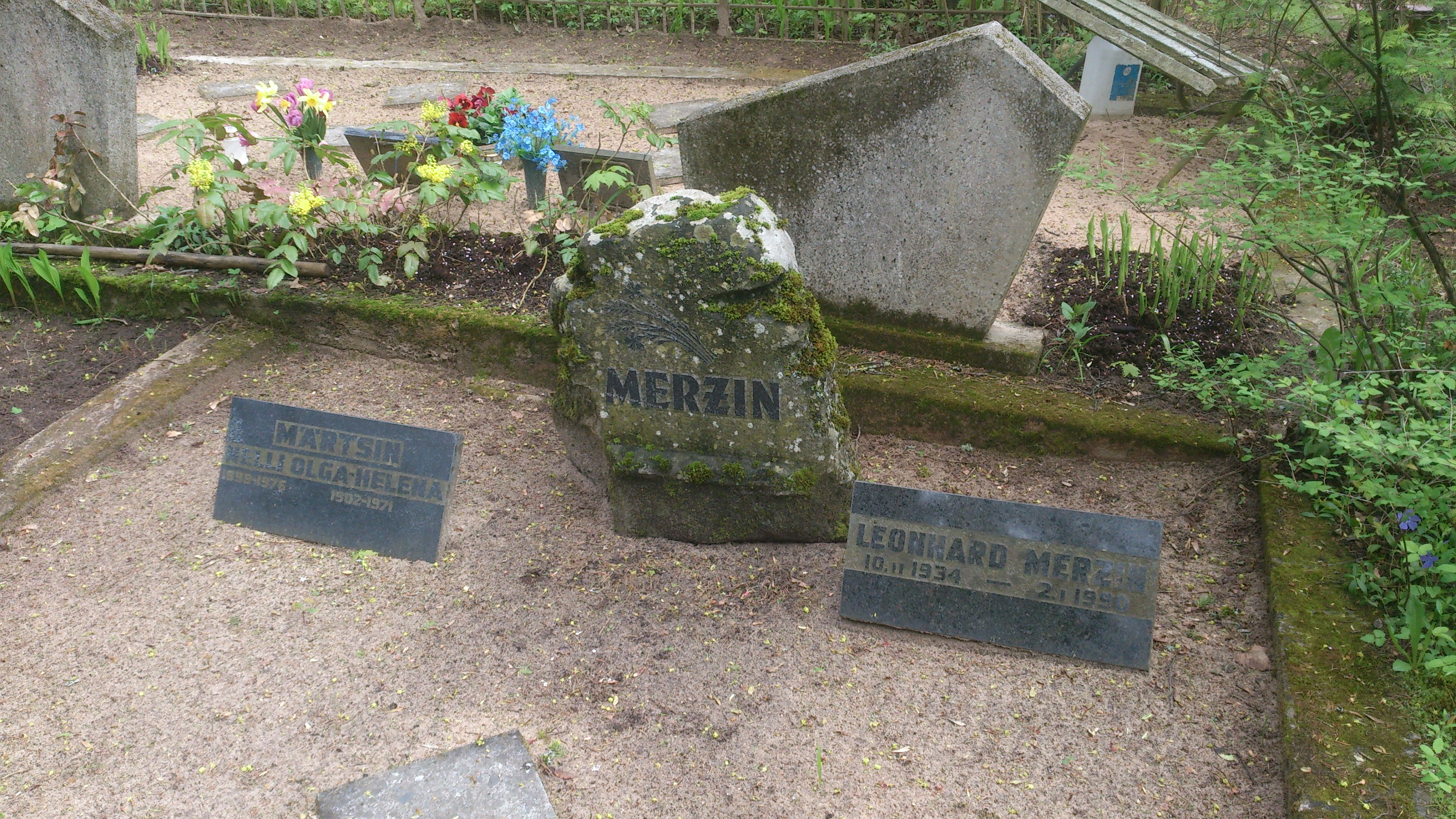
Tombstone on the actor's grave

He is buried at the Raadi cemetery in Tartu.

== Filmography ==
Year	Title	Role	Notes
1965	Külmale maale	Väljaotsa Jaan	
1968	Inimesed sõdurisinelis	Mänd	
1968	Dead Season	Father Mortimer	
1968	Libahunt	Jass	
1969	Hullumeelsus	Kristus	Uncredited
1969	The Gladiators	Laar	
1969	Spring	Laur	
1970	King Lear	Edgar	
1971	Risk	Kurtz	
1972	Back to Life	Arno	
1972	In the Black Sands	Peltin	
1973	Maaletulek	Mart	
1973	Dmitry Kantemir	Russet	
1973	Racers	Bruno Lorenz	
1973	Identification	Peter	
1974	Dangerous Games	2241	
1975	The Balloonist	Charles Rigaut	
1975	Diamonds for the Dictatorship of the Proletariat	Auguste	
1976	Trust	Jukka Rahja	
1977	Waiting for Me on Earth	Colonel Belousov	
1979	Special Forces	Ozyoryn	
1981	I Do Not Guarantee Personal Safety...	Yevgeniy Krakovskiy	
1986	Race of the Century	Donald Crowhurst	(final film role)
