= Racers (film) =

- Russian: Гонщики
- Directed by: Igor Maslennikov
- Written by: Yuri Klemanov; Igor Maslennikov; Iosif Olshansky; Nina Rudneva
- Starring: Yevgeny Leonov; Oleg Yankovsky; Georgiy Burkov; Larisa Luzhina; Armen Dzhigarkhanyan; Leonhard Merzin
- Cinematography: Vladimir Vasilyev; Felix Gilevich
- Music by: Vladimir Dashkevich
- Production company: Lenfilm
- Release date: 1972
- Running time: 75 minutes
- Country: Soviet Union
- Language: Russian

Racers (Russian: Гонщики, Gonshchiki) is a 1972 Soviet drama film directed by Igor Maslennikov.

The film talks about the conflict between two racing drivers: an aging master of sports and his ambitious student.

== Plot ==
The film tells the story of true friendship between two racecar drivers who work at the Moskvich automobile plant: Ivan Mikhailovich Kukushkin (played by Yevgeny Leonov) and Nikolai Nikolayevich Sergachev (played by Oleg Yankovsky). The two men have raced together for years, competing as a team in international rally events with their "Moskvich-412" race car. However, everything changes after an accident in the Alps. While trying to avoid a collision with a Volkswagen Beetle, Kukushkin loses control, causing their Moskvich to veer off the road and overturn on a mountain slope, leaving both drivers hospitalized. Following this incident, Sergachev decides that Kukushkin is too old for racing and chooses a new partner. Their split shocks many, as a single incident has destroyed their bond. Now, former teammates become rivals in the "Blue Pass" rally, a major competition set on winding mountain roads along the Black Sea coast of the Caucasus.

During the rally, two crashes occur: first, Bruno Lorenz, driving an Izh-412, damages his tire on a metal spike, loses control, and rolls off the track. Shortly after, a Volga with number 30 suffers the same fate and flips near Lorenz's car. Sergachev's crew drives past without stopping to help the injured drivers, while Kukushkin's team stops, picks up the injured competitor, and transports him to the hospital.

During a break between stages, Kukushkin confronts his former partner about the incident, but Sergachev explains he was asleep at the time and had entrusted the wheel to Spitsyn, who failed to stop and assist. Sergachev later reprimands Spitsyn, who claims he didn’t notice the crashed cars as he was driving at 150 km/h.

At the next stage, the racers encounter locals celebrating a wedding on the road, forcing Sergachev to stop. The wedding guests insist he drink wine from a ceremonial horn, but Sergachev points to Spitsyn, who reluctantly drinks the large portion. As they resume the race, Spitsyn, now tipsy, falls asleep in the back seat. Meanwhile, Sergachev’s car experiences brake failure. He skillfully maneuvers to slow down, narrowly avoiding a cliff, stopping just at the edge. Trapped, he cannot exit the car without it tipping over, forcing him to balance his weight alongside the sleeping Spitsyn to prevent the Moskvich from plunging down the cliff.

Kukushkin, who arrives shortly after, rescues Sergachev by towing his car to safety with a rope. Due to the braking issues, Sergachev’s transmission is damaged, making it impossible to continue the race without repairs. Kukushkin offers his spare transmission and oil, intending to help fix the damaged car and bleed the brake system. However, his teammate, Alexey Shvedov, who is eager to maintain their lead in the race, urges Kukushkin to leave. Reluctantly, Kukushkin leaves his friend, now resigned to defeat. Other competitors passing by offer help, but Sergachev refuses.

== Cast ==
- Yevgeny Leonov
- Oleg Yankovsky
- Georgiy Burkov
- Larisa Luzhina
- Armen Dzhigarkhanyan
- Leonhard Merzin
- Nina Ilyina
- Nikolai Ferapontov
- Olga Rolich
- Andrei Gretsov
- Boris Arakelov
