= Israel Orenstein =

- Born: 19 May 1831; Yampol, Podolian Governorate, Russian Empire
- Died: 1905 (aged 73–74)
- Writing career
- Language: Yiddish, Hebrew

Israel Orenstein (Yiddish: ישראל ארענשטיין; 19 May 1831 – 1905) was a Ukrainian-born Jewish novelist.

He was born in the Polodian town of Yampol, Podolian Governorate. At the age of twenty-one he went to Romania, where he published (1870) his first novel in Hebrew, Bet Ya'akov; o, dim'at 'ashukim. He subsequently published the Yiddish novels Arbe aves nezikin, Dos shlekhte kind, Eyts ha-daas, Khizoyen yisroel; oder, khibet hakeyver, Di geheymnisse der Yassyer gemeynde, and Di genarte velt.

== Bibliography ==
- Bet Ya'akov; o, dim'at 'ashukim [The House of Israel; or, Tears of the Oppressed] (in Hebrew). 1870.
- Arbe aves nezikin [Damages of Four Fathers] (in Yiddish).
- Dos shlekhte kind [The Evil Child] (in Yiddish).
- Khizoyen Yisroel; oder, khibet hakeyver [Israel's Prophetic Vision; or, Punishment after Death] (in Yiddish).
- A vol yingl khlebin [A Decent Lad, Really] (in Yiddish). Lemberg. 1882.
- Ferdorbinim daytsh [Depraved German] (in Yiddish). Lemberg: Jacob Ehrenpreis. 1882.
- Eyts ha-daas; oder, di tsivilizatsyon [The Tree of Knowledge; or, Civilization] (in Yiddish). Jassy: W. Leinwand. 1883.
- Di geheymnisse der Yassyer gemeynde [The Secret of the Jassy Community] (in Yiddish). Jassy: W. Leinwand. 1888.
- Rayones Yisroel; oder, di genarte velt [Jewish Imagination; or The Disappointed World] (in Yiddish). Jassy: W. Leinwand. 1893.
- Gilgl shoykhed; oder, der Mitsraim hund [Transformation of Graft; or, The Dog of Egypt] (in Yiddish). Jassy: W. Leinwand. 1906.
