= Yampil Raion, Vinnytsia Oblast =

Former subdivision of Vinnytsia Oblast, Ukraine

Yampil Raion Ямпільський район
- Raion
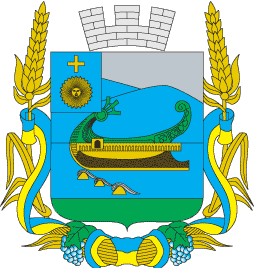
- Flag Coat of arms

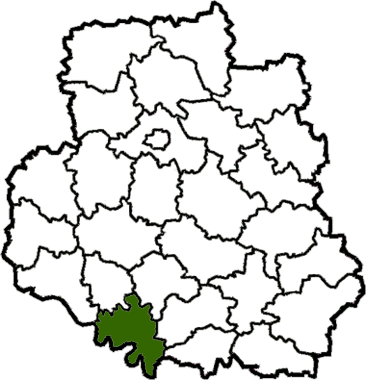
- Coordinates: 48°45′00″N 28°45′00″E
- Country: Ukraine
- Oblast: Vinnytsia Oblast
- Established: 4 January 1965
- Disestablished: 18 July 2020
- Admin. center: Yampil
- Subdivisions: List: 1 — city councils; 0 — settlement councils; 18 — rural councils; Number of localities: 1 — cities; 0 — urban-type settlements; 38 — villages; — rural settlements

Government
  - Governor: Volodymdr Voloshin

Area
  - Total: 790 km^{2} (310 sq mi)

Population (2020)
  - Total: 38,110 ▼
  - Density: 48/km^{2} (120/sq mi)
- Time zone: UTC+02:00 (EET)
  - Summer (DST): UTC+03:00 (EEST)
- Postal index: 24500—24546
- Area code: +380 4336
- Website: http://yamp.gov.ua/

Yampil Raion (Ukrainian: Ямпільський район) was one of raions of Vinnytsia Oblast, located in southwestern Ukraine. The administrative center of the raion was the town of Yampil. The raion was abolished and its territory was merged into Mohyliv-Podilskyi Raion on 18 July 2020 as part of the administrative reform of Ukraine, which reduced the number of raions of Vinnytsia Oblast to six. The last estimate of the raion population was 38,110 (2020 est.).
