= Alla Kigel =

Russian theatre director (1932–2025)

- Born: August 29, 1932; Moscow, Russia, (USSR)
- Died: November 21, 2025 (aged 93)
- Occupations: Theatre director, television reporter and director, and educator

Alla Grigorievna Kigel (Алла Кигель; August 29, 1932 – November 21, 2025) was a Russian theatre director. She was one of a few female directors in the Soviet Union during the 1960s. Her work followed Stanislavski's system. Her father, Gregory Lvovich Kigel (Григорий Львович Кигель), was a theater designer.

== Life and career ==
In 1945, Kigel made her directorial debut at her school with Balzac's Splendeurs et misères des courtisanes and an adaptation of Pushkin's The Gypsies.

In 1950, she was refused admission into the Russian Academy of Theatre Arts. Kigel instead pursued a career as a criminal lawyer, and gained a master's degree in law, from Moscow State University in 1954. In 1956 she enrolled in Shchukin Theatre School.

In 1993, Kigel took a course in Public Relations at Columbia University.

Kigel died on November 21, 2025, at the age of 93.

== Work ==
- 1991-1992 - State Television of the USSR
- 1992–Present - WMNB Radio/TV Station in Fort Lee, NJ; created and directed radio/TV programs, and hosted an open line show.
- 1999-2000 - Chekhov Now Off-Broadway Arts Festival; conducted a workshop for young drama directors. Prepared a stage adaptation of Chekhov’s short story "Enemies"
- 2001-2003 - RTN Gold Radio Station in Fort Lee, NJ; Hosted an open line show, Dialogue
- 2012 - Six Master classes in Moscow theater schools: GITIS, VGIK, Moscow Art Theatre School.
