= Stozhary =

Film festival in Kyiv, Ukraine

Festival Stozhary is an international actors film festival which takes place in Kyiv, Ukraine. The name of the festival is an Old Slavonic counterpart for the asterism of Pleiades. In the mythology of ancient Greece Pleiads were the 7 beautiful daughters of the Titan Atlas and the sea-nymph Pleione. Turned into 7 birds by Zeus they later became 7 bright stars, which formed beautiful constellation.

The mysterious 7 became the code structure of the festival “Stozhary” – 7 days the festival lasts, 7 prizes the winners receive, 7 members of jury, 7 colors of rainbow which along with the winged Pleaiad-maid became the symbol of the festival.

Through the history of the festival - 1995, 1997, 1999, 2003, 2005, cinematographers from Russia, Belarus, Georgia, Latvia, Estonia, Moldavia, Poland, Serbia, Austria, Italy, Germany, USA and Ukraine were the guests and participants of the festival contest. The festival was covered by the media of Ukraine, Russia, Belarus and Poland.

The festival contributes to strengthening and intensification of the brotherhood of actors and provides for non-official, non-formal atmosphere in which cinematographers can resolve issues, gain new experiences, teach and learn, share inspiration, uphold each other and bring happiness to the spectators.

Actors film festival is different from traditional festival forums in that only the actors works and performances are the subject for its contest and jury assessment. For today, International Film Festival Stozhary is the only international actors film festival in the world.

== Festival history ==
=== Stozhary '95 ===
1st Open Actors Film Festival Stozhary in Kyiv took place on August 22–28, 1995.

22 Ukrainian films produced since 1991 till 1995 took part in the contest. During the festival the score of press conferences, actor-audience meetings, round-table discussions and actors’ recitals (professional actors clubs) took place. The festival events were covered by the leading media of Ukraine and Russian TV companies. The series of Leonid Filatov TV program “O teh kogo pomnim…” was filmed during the festival, covering the life and work of prominent Ukrainian cinematographers Ivan Nikolaychuk, Leonid Bikov, Nikolai Grinko. Meetings with actors, premiere screenings and other festival events took place in Kyiv, Slavutich and Dnepropetrovsk cities of Ukraine. The festival success drew attention of the Ukrainian government and international actors community.

==== Stozhary '95 jury ====
Jury chairman: National Artist of the USSR Via Artmane Jury members: Raisa Nedashkivska (National Artist of Ukraine), Lev Perfilov (Honored artist of Ukraine), Svetlana Kruchkova, Igor Dmitriev, Vladimir Konkin, Elena Drapeko (National Artists of Russia).

==== Stozhary '95 Prize-Winners ====
Nomination	Actor's Name	Film name	Director	Country
Best Actor in a Leading Role	Georgiy Drozd	Marrying Death	Nikolay Maschenko	Ukraine
Best Actor in a Leading Role	Aleksander Peskov	American Boy	Boris Kvashnev	Russia
Best Actress in a Leading Role	Inna Kapinos	Cherry Nights	Arkadiy Mikulskiy	Ukraine
Best Actress in a Supporting Role	Galina Sulima	Marrying death	Nikolay Maschenko	Ukraine
Best Actor in a Supporting Role	Bohdan Stupka	Fuchzhou	Michaylo Ilyenko	Ukraine
Best Actor in a Supporting Role	Bohdan Stupka	Gelly and Nok	Vadim Ilyenko	Ukraine
Best Debut	Ivanka Ilyenko	Fuchzhou	Michaylo Ilyenko	Ukraine
Best Non-Professional Actor	Natalia Raskokoha	Fuchzhou	Michaylo Ilyenko	Ukraine
Best Non-Professional Actor	Vadim Skuratovski	Josephina the Singer & the Mouse Nation	Sergey Masloboyschikov	Ukraine
Best Actor in Short Film	Bohdan Benyuk	Vishivanka	Vasil Dombrovski	Ukraine

==== Stozhary '95 Additional Awards ====
Award	Actor's Name	Film name	Director	Country
Audience Admiration Prize	Vladimir Gostuhin	American Boy	Boris Kvashnev	Belarus
Audience Admiration Prize	Anatoliy Hostikoev	Vikup	Vladimir Balkashinov	Ukraine
Audience Admiration Prize	Andrey Ankudinov	A child by November	Alexander Pavlovski	Russia

- Special Jury Prize: „To Director. For the High Professionalism in Work with an Actor”. Awarded to National Artist of Ukraine, director Nikolay Maschenko for the film „Marrying death”.
- Screen Actors Guild of Ukraine Special Prize: "To Actor. For the Great Contribution to Cinematography". Awarded to National Artist of Ukraine, Ada Rogovtseva; National Artist of Ukraine, Konstantin Stepankov; National Artist of Ukraine,

Ivan Gavriluk; National Artist of Ukraine, Natalia Naum.

=== Stozhary '97 ===
2nd Open International Actors Film Festival Stozhary in Kyiv took place on August 30 - September 7, 1997.

Stozhary '97 was perfect international cinema celebration. The 2nd Stozhary festival invited more than 30 guests from CIS, Baltic States and Eastern Europe among which:

==== The Guests ====
Russia:

National Artists of Russia: Nikolai Karachentsov, Olga Kabo, Igor Bochkin, Vsevolod Shilovsky, Nikolai Burlyayev, Mikhail Svetin.

Actors: Andrey Ankudinov, Elena Tonunts.

Mark Rudinshtein (Festival “Kinotavr” General Producer).

Latvia: Ivars Kalniņš.

Georgia: Baadur Tsuladze (Honored Artist of Georgia, the President of Screen Actors Guild of Georgia).

Poland:

Film Director Jerzy Hoffman

Actors: Daniel Olbrychski, Barbara Brylska, Jerzy Zelnik.

Critics: Janusz Gazda, Danuta Suchowierska.

Serbia:

Yovan Markovic (Script writer and Film Director).

Actors: Elena Zhigon, Vera Trifonova-Muyovich, Ivanna Zhigon.

Belarus:

National Artists of Belarus: Vladimir Gostuhin, Svetlana Okruzhnaya. Svetlana Suhovey (Honored Artist of Belarus, the President of Screen Actors Guild of Belarus).

Stozhary '97 jury:

Jury chairman: Valeria Zaklunnaya (National Artist of Ukraine).

Jury members: Barbara Brylska (Poland), Elena Zhigon (Serbia), Michael Svetin (Russia), Vladimir Gostuhin (Belarus), Ivars Kalniņš (Latvia), Michaylo Golubovich (Ukraine).

==== Stozhary '97 Prize-Winners ====
Nomination	Actor's Name	Film name	Director	Country
Best Actor in a Leading Role	Igor Bochkin	Barhanov and his Bodyguard	Valeriy Lanskoy	Russia
Best Actress in a Leading Role	Marina Mogilevskaya	Reportazh	Vladimir Balkashinov	Ukraine
Best Actor in a Supporting Role	Vsevolod Shilovskiy	Barhanov and his Bodyguard	Valeriy Lanskoy	Russia
Best Actress in a Supporting Role	Nina Sharalapova		Michael Belikov	Ukraine
Best Debut	Natalia Dolia	Off with the Shame	Alexander Muratov	Ukraine
Best Non-Professional Actress	Tatiana Krivitskaya	Deadman’s friend	Vyacheslav Krishtofovich	Ukraine
Best Actor in Short Film	Anatoliy Kotenev	Cherniy Yaschik		Belarus

- Screen Actors Guild of Ukraine Special Prize: "To Actor. For the Great Contribution to Cinematography". Awarded to National Artists of Ukraine: Nikolay Olialin, Les Serdiuk, Raisa Nedashkivska, Larisa Kadochnikova, Lev Perfilov.

==== Testimony ====
Jerzy Hoffman

I feel great here, not only as an artist but just as I am, as a person. On the whole, I think the festivals are indispensable as they let artists meet, dispute, argue time to time, and sometimes just see each other face to face. It always brings something new. I am so much surprised, so surprised with what I saw here. And not only concerning organization, hospitality etc. But the entire atmosphere every evening, the ability to see all the interesting and great in the city, and the ability to see and communicate with each other face to face. I am glad! Really glad that the festival is here in Kyiv. Because its so important for us, the Poles, that the renascence of national spirituality, without which there could be no state and economic development happens this way. And may the Lord help you! That’s why I am with you, with my entire heart I am with you!

Daniel Olbrychski

It is very important, very important because someone thinks of our profession. In order for the performance or the movie to take place there will be one person, a cameraman who will turn the camera on. What is more important – we need at least one spectator and an actor. And when we have millions of spectators the actors will always be talented, the key is the work and love of spectators.

=== Stozhary '99 ===
3rd International Actors Film Festival Stozhary in Kyiv took place on October 12–20, 1999.

Strozhary ‘99 screened the films by Emir Kusturica, Srdjan Dragojevic, Kira Muratova, Krzysztof Zanussi and other prominent movie makers. The festival invited its respected guests from CIS, Baltic States and Eastern Europe.

==== The Guests ====
Russia: Igor Bochkin, Eugene Zharikov, Natalya Gvozdikova, Andrew Ankudinov, Galina Bokashevskaya, Natalya Varley, Oleg Onufriev.

Latvia: Ivars Kalnins.

Georgia: Baadur Tsuladze (Honored Artist of Georgia, the President of Screen Actors Guild of Georgia).

Poland: Daniel Olbrychski, Dorota Stalinska, Agnieszka Włodarczyk, Janusz Gazda, Danuta Suchowierska.

Serbia: Yovan Markovic, Dragan Bjelogrlić, Lazar Ristovski, Alenka Rancic, Voja Miric, Dusan Pekic.

Belarus: Anatoliy Kotenev, Svetlana Suhovey, Svetlana Okruzhnaya.

==== Stozhary '99 jury ====
The festival jury was represented by 2 boards in 1999: the Actors Jury and the Critics Jury.

Actors Jury Chairman: Larisa Kadochnikova (National Artist of Ukraine).

Actors Jury members: Dorota Stakinska (Poland), Voya Miric (Serbia), Natalya Gvozdikova (National Artist of Russia), Baadur Tsuladze (Honored Artist of Georgia), Ivan Gavriluk (National Artist of Ukraine), Eve Kivi (National Artist of Estonia).

Critics Jury Chairman: Janusz Gazda

Critics Jury members: Valeria Gushchina (Russia), Alenka Ranchich (Serbia), Ludmila Lemesheva (Ukraine), Oksana Zabuzhko (Ukraine), Sergey Trimbach (Ukraine), Oksana Musienko (Ukraine).

==== Stozhary '99 Prize-Winners ====
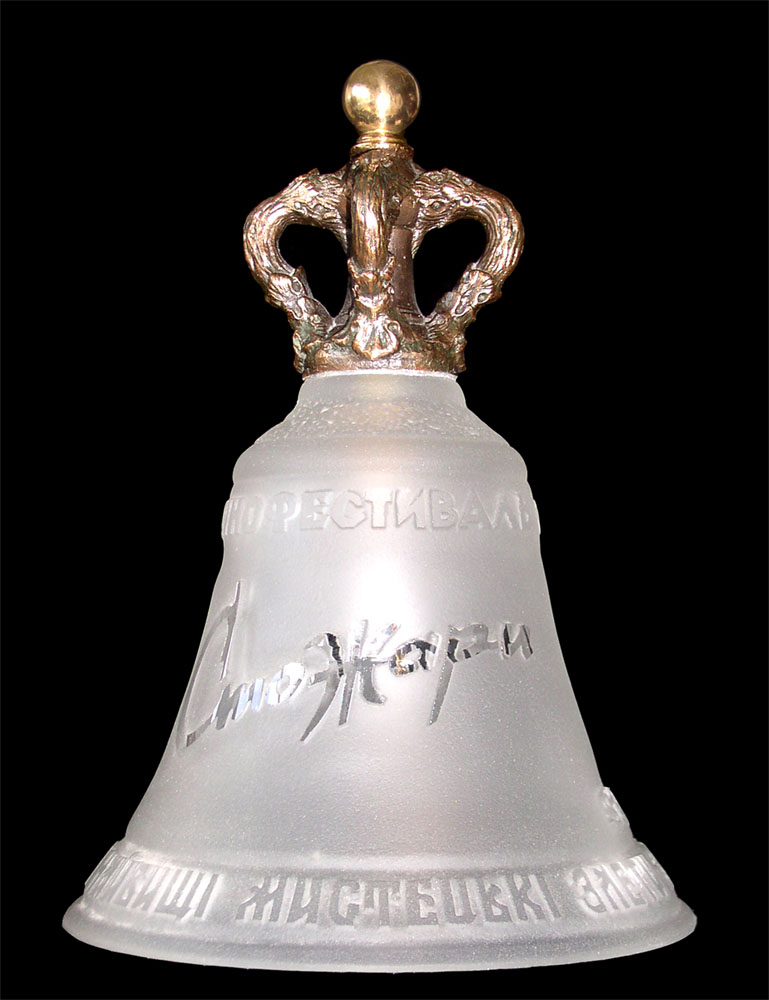
Crystal Bell, special festival prize

Nomination	Actor's Name	Film name	Director	Country
Best Actor in a Leading Role	Yuriy Dubrovin	Okraina	Pyotr Lutsik	Ukraine
Best Actor in a Leading Role	Zurab Begalishvili	Zdes Rassvet	Zaza Urushadze	Georgia
Best Actress in a Leading Role	Galina Bokashevskaya	Totalitarian Romance	Vyacheslav Sorokin	Russia
Best Actor in a Supporting Role	Vsevolod Shilovskiy	Barhanov and his Bodyguard	Valeriy Lanskoy	Russia
Best Actor in a Supporting Role	Dragan Nikolić	Barrel of Gunpowder	Goran Paskaljević	Serbia
Best Actress in a Supporting Role	Zora Manojlovic	Rane	Srdjan Dragojevic	Serbia
Best Debut	Agnieszka Włodarczyk	Sara	Maciej Ślesicki	Poland
Best Debut	Dusan Pekic	Rane	Srdjan Dragojevic	Serbia

- Special Prize: Crystal Bell "To Actor. For the Highest Creative Ascent". Awarded to the prominent figures in European Cinema: Bogdan Stupka (Ukraine), Daniel Olbrychski (Poland), Bata Živojinović (Serbia).
- Screen Actors Guild of Ukraine Special Prize: "To Actor. For the Great Contribution to Cinematography". Awarded to Margarita Krinitsina (National Artist of Ukraine) and Georgiy Drozd (National Artist of Ukraine).

=== Stozhary 2003 ===
4th International Actors Film Festival Stozhary in Kyiv, August 22–28, 2003.

For the first time in the festival Stozhary history the philosophic round-table discussions took place. Headed by Nazip Hamitov (Ph. D., professor, author and radio programme host, writer, script writer and psychoanalyst) the discussions analysed wide spectrum of issues involving: "Eros and Thanatos in cinema", "The Evolution of Masculine and Feminine", "Masculinization of a Woman and Feminization of a Man", "Love Metamorphoses in Cinema on the Turn of Millennia: passion, friendship, co-creativity".

==== The Guests ====
Russia:

Stanislav Govorukhin (famous film director, MP), Elena Drapeko (National Artist of Russia, MP), Kirill Razlogov (Director of The Russian Institute for Cultural Research), Natalia Viko (writer, script writer), Valeia Gushchina (Director of the Screen Actors Guild of Russia).

Actors: Andrew Ankudinov, Sergey Glushko, Olga Filippova.

Georgia: Baadur Tsuladze (Honored Artist of Georgia), Niko Tavadze.

USA-Georgia: Levan Uchaneishvili.

Poland:

- Actors: Piotr Adamczyk, Gabriela Kownacka.
- Arts critics: Janusz Gazda, Danuta Suchowierska.

Serbia: Yovan Markovic (script writer, film director); Elena Golubovic, Katarina Radivojević.

Belarus: Svetlana Suhovey (Honored Artist of Belarus), Svetlana Zelenkovskaya, Anatoly Kot.

Contest Films:

Film name	Director	Country
Shum Vetra (Sound of the Wind)	Segey Masloboyshchikov	Ukraine
Mamay	Oles Sanin	Ukraine
Chopin: Desire for Love	Jerzy Antczak	Польша
Quo vadis	Jerzy Kawalerowicz	Poland
Money is not Everything	Juliusz Machulski	Poland
Anastasia Slutskaya	Yuriy Elhov	Belarus
Karmen	Alexander Khvan	Russia
To Fall Up	Alexander Strizhenov	Russia
Zona Zamfirova	Zdravko Shotra	Serbia
Yagoda from Supremarket	Dushan Milich	Serbia
27 Missing Kisses	Nana Dzhordzhadze	Georgia
By the Spiral Stairs	Merab Tavadze	Georgia

Stozhary 2003 jury:

For the first time the festival jury was merged into single body involving the critics and the actors.

Jury Chairman: Raisa Nedashkovskaya (National Artist of Ukraine).

Jury members: Baadur Tsuladze, Janusz Gazda, Yovan Markovic, Kirill Razlogov, Nikolay Olialin (National Artist of Ukraine), Andrew Kurkov, Sergey Trimbatch, Ludmila Lemesheva.

==== Stozhary 2003 Prize-Winners ====
Nomination	Actor's Name	Film name	Director	Country
Best Actor in a Leading Role	Piotr Adamczyk	Chopin: Desire for Love	Jerzy Antczak	Poland
Best Actress in a Leading Role	Danuta Stenka	Chopin: Desire for Love	Jerzy Antczak	Poland
Best Actress in a Leading Role	Alla Sergiyko	Shum Vetra	Sergey Masloboyshchikov	Ukraine
Best Actor in a Supporting Role	Levan Uchaneishvili	27 Stolen Kisses	Nana Djordjadze	USA-Georgia
Best Actress in a Supporting Role	Marina Yakovleva	Falling Up	Alexander Strizhenov	Russia
Best Debut	Svetlana Zelenkovskaya	Anastasiya Slutskaya	Yuriy Elhov	Belarus
Best Debut	Niko Tavadze	Po Vintovoy Lestnitse	Merab Tavadze	Georgia
Best Non-Professional Actor	Sergey Glushko	Anastasiya Slutskaya	Yuriy Elhov	Russia

- Special Jury Diploma: "For the Personification of Classic Image of a Woman in a Modern Way" in the film "Carmen" by Alexander Hvan. Awarded to Olga Filippova.
- Special Jury Diploma: "For Brilliant Presentation of a National Image" in the film "Zona Zamfirova" by Alexander Hvan. Awarded to Katarina Radivojević.
- Festival Executive Committee Special Prize: "Mother". Awarded to Stanislav Govorukhin, the founder of the alternative festival movement in Soviet and Pos-Soviet time.

=== Stozhary 2005 ===
The form of the 5th International Actors Film Festival Stozhary (September 25–30, 2005) was slightly altered in 2005. The festival was given a new motto: "The Secret of Unfettered Mind." The rainbow, which symbolizes the clear light of human aura, became the official image of the festival.

The festival themes were made more specific in 2005 focusing the selection process on the films which tell of human spirituality, spiritual search and love. For the first time since its inception the festival received guests from Austria, Germany and Italy inviting Western European cinematographers to compete in the festival contest.

==== General list of films screened during the festival in 2005 ====
Festival Contest Participants
Film name	Director	Country
Noch Svetla (The Bright Night)	Roman Balayan	Ukraine
Nastroyshchik (The Tuner)	Kira Muratova	Ukraine
Zalizna Sotnia (Iron Hundred)	Les Yanchuk	Ukraine
Ukradennoe Schastye (Stolen Happiness)	Andrey Donchik	Ukraine
Bless the Woman	Stanislav Govorukhin	Russia
Tbilisi, Tbilisi	Levan Zakareishvili	Georgia
Ono	Małgorzata Szumowska	Poland
Nienasycenie (Insatiability)	Wiktor Grodecki	Poland
Mój Nikifor (My Nikifor)	Krzysztof Krauze	Poland
Dunechka	Alexander Efremov	Belarus
Ainoa	Marco Kalantari	Austria
Midwinter's Night Dream	Goran Paskaljević	Serbia
Short Films
Peresohla Zemlia (Parched Land)	Taras Tomenko	Ukraine
Kofeman (Coffee Addict)	Alexander Itigilov	Ukraine
Bereg (The Сoast)	Konstantin Denesuk	Ukraine
Redkiy Dozhd (Drizzle)	Georgiy Deliev	Ukraine
Tatar Triptych	Alexander Muratov	Ukraine
Christina and Denis	Dmitriy Popov	Ukraine
Escho Raz o Voyne (Again About the War)	Petr Krivostanenko	Belarus
The Bridge	Mishko Miloevic	Serbia
Hors Concours Screenings
Ne Hlebom Edinim	Stanislav Govorukhin	Russia
Julia Walking Home	Agnieszka Holland	Canada, Poland
Karol: A Man Who Became Pope	Giacomo Battiato	Poland
The Prayer of Leyla	Satibaldy Narimbetov	Kazakhstan

==== Stozhary 2005 jury ====
The festival jury was again represented by 2 boards.

Actors Jury: Marina Mogilevskaya (Chairman, Russia), Vladimir Goryansky (Ukraine), Alexander Pankratov-Cherniy (Russia), Nikita Dzhigurda (Russia), Vera Trifonova-Mujovic (Serbia), Svetlana Zelenkovskaya (Belarus).

Critics Jury: Nazip Hamitov (Chairman), Ludmila Lemesheva (Ukraine), Yovan Markovic (Serbia), Yulia Monahova (Russia), Svetlana Krilova (Ukraine).

==== Stozhary 2005 Prize-Winners ====
Nomination	Actor's Name	Film name	Director	Country
Grand Prix	Krystyna Feldman	Mój Nikifor	Krzysztof Krauze	Poland
Best Actor in a Leading Role	Georgy Deliev	The Tuner	Kira Muratova	Ukraine
Best Actress in a Leading Role	Svetlana Hodchenkova	Bless the Woman	Stanislav Govorukhin	Russia
Best Actor in a Supporting Role	Marek Walczewski	Ono	Małgorzata Szumowska	Poland
Best Actress in a Supporting Role	Irina Kupchenko	Noch Svetla	Roman Balayan	Russia
Best Debut	Michal Lewandowski	Nienasycenie (Insatiability)	Wiktor Grodecki	Poland
Best Non-Professional Actor	Małgosia Bela	Ono	Małgorzata Szumowska	Poland
Best actor in short film	Sergey Sipliviy	Peresohla Zemlia	Taras Tomenko	Ukraine
Best actress in short film	Svetlana Kozhemyakina	Escho Raz o Voyne	Petr Krivostanenko	Belarus

In the context of the festival complementary programs the series of activities took place:

- Round-table discussions: "Unfettered Mind: infernal to divine." Author and the host - Nazip Hamitov (Ph. D., professor, psychoanalyst). The films "Ainoa" by Marco Kalantari and "Insatiability" by Wiktor Grodecki were the key subjects for discussions which involved the dialogues with the filmmakers and the actors in key roles, and the film psychoanalysis.
- Close-up meeting: "Politics in the Cinema". Participants: Stanislav Govorukhin, Daniel Olbrychski, Jan Machulski, Baadur Tsuladze.
- Masterclasses: Georgy Deliev, Baadur Tsuladze, Nikita Dzhigurda.

==== Panorama ====
Along with the films which compete in the contest festival Stozhary also demonstrates hors concours movies. The panorama participants do not compete and are awarded precise diplomas based on the jury's decision.

The Stars of the Day to Come: "The Stars of the Day to Come" is the festival panorama section which screens the works of children and younger actors under 16.

In 2005 the diplomas were awarded to:

Actor's Name	Film name	Director	Country
Maria Vozba	Dunechka	Alexander Efremov	Belarus
Olga Goliza	Noch Svetla	Roman Balayan	Ukraine
Dasha Tarasuk	Mechta (The Dream)	Aksinya Kurina	Ukraine
Philip Sotnichenko	Kristina i Denis	Dmitriy Popov	Ukraine
Irina Salagaeva	Tatar Triptych	Alexander Muratov	Ukraine

- Special Jury Diploma: "For the highest professionalism in reflecting the depths of the human "Self." Awarded to Lazar Ristovski (Serbia) for the film "Midwinter's Night Dream" by director Goran Paskaljević.
- Special Jury Prize: "For the personification of love saving the world." Awarded to Verena Buratti (Italy) for the film "Ainoa" by director Marco Kalantari.
- Special Jury Diploma: "For disclosing infernal sides of the human being." Awarded to Cezary Pazura (Poland) for the film "Nienasycenie" by director Wiktor Grodecki.
- Special Jury Diploma: "For the highest professionalism in revealing the spirituality a contemporary person." Awarded to Baadur Tsuladze (Georgia) for the films "Tbilisi, Tbilisi" by Levan Zakareishvili, "Bereg" by Konstantin Denesuk, "The Prayer of Leyla" by Satibaldy Narimbetov.
- Special Prize: Crystal Bell "To Actor. For the Highest Creative Ascent". Awarded to Nikolay Olialin (National Artist of Ukraine).

== Festival nominations ==
Key Nominations

- Best actor in a leading role
- Best actress in a leading role
- Best actor in a supporting role
- Best actress in a supporting role
- Best non-professional actor
- Best debut
- Best episode.

Secondary Nominations

- Best actor in short film
- Best young actor.

== Festival Goals ==
- to provide for professional, creative "actors workshop" - an atmosphere of absolute mental and emotional trust;
- to view the works and see the views of experts and young colleagues from CIS, Baltic States and Europe;
- to draw interest to new attainments of movie makers;
- to provide for development of culture of cinema in Ukraine;
- to demonstrate the works of European movie experts, their search for new language and technologies in cinema art.
