= Kudina =

Village in Estonia

Coordinates: 58°40′N 26°41′E

- Village
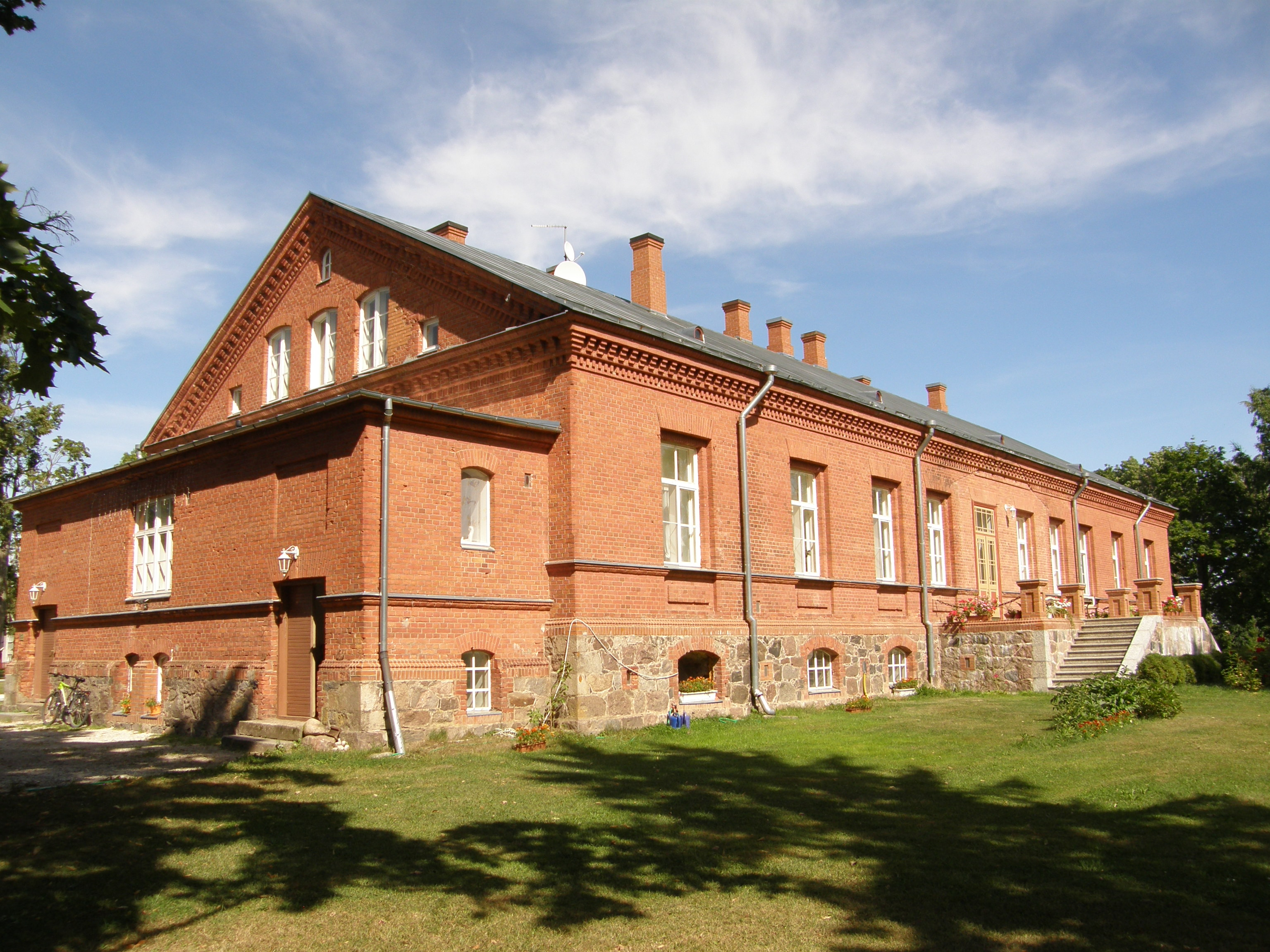
- Kudina Manor
- Interactive map of Kudina
- Country: Estonia
- County: Jõgeva County
- Parish: Jõgeva Parish
- Time zone: UTC+2 (EET)
  - Summer (DST): UTC+3 (EEST)

Kudina (German: Kudding) is a village in Jõgeva Parish, Jõgeva County in eastern Estonia.
