= Yampil, Vinnytsia Oblast =

City in Vinnytsia Oblast, Ukraine

Yampil Ямпіль
- City
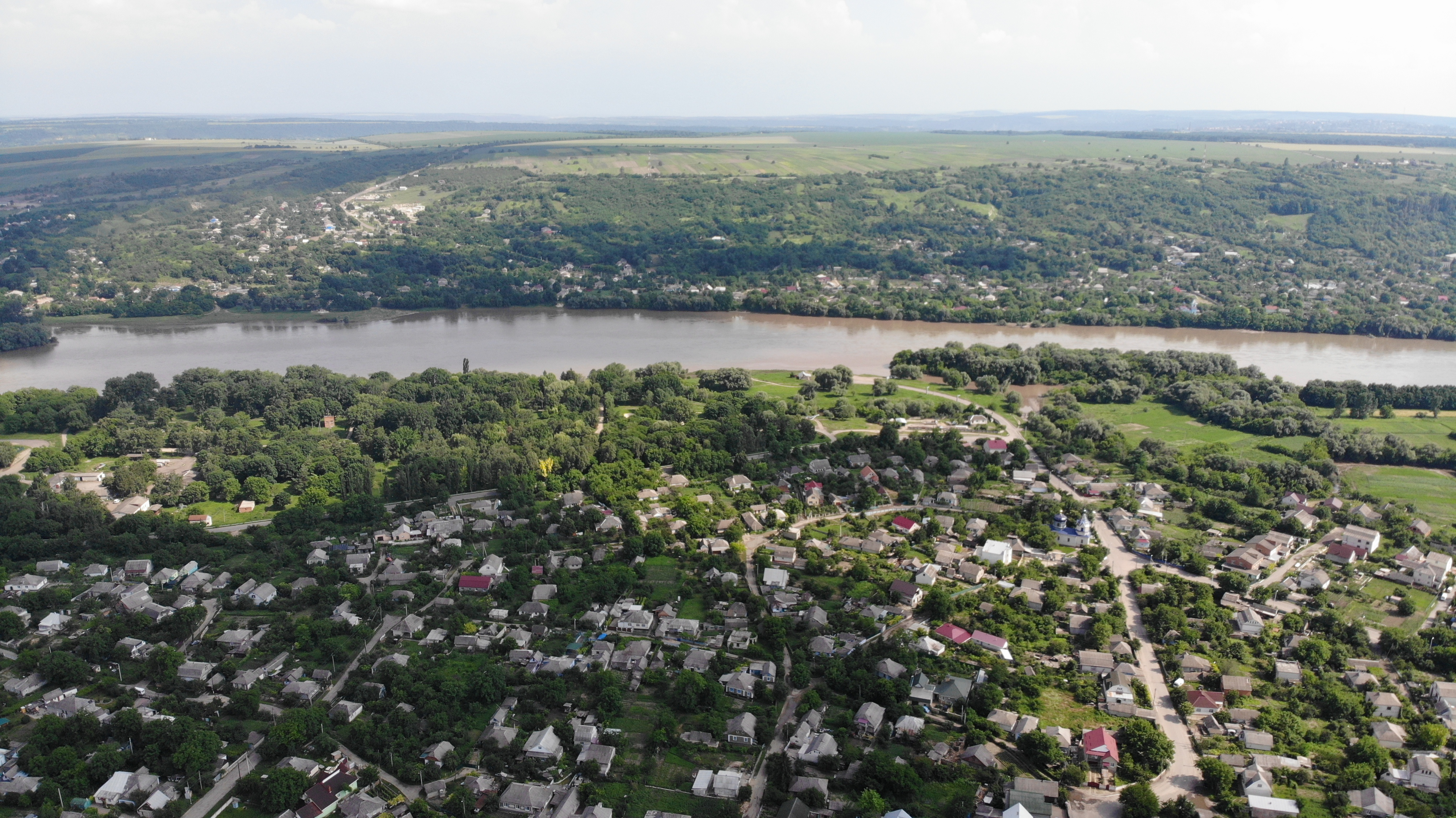
- Aerial view

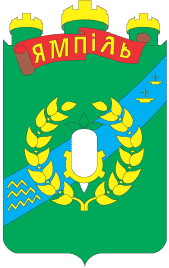
- Flag Coat of arms
- Interactive map of Yampil
- Location of Yampil in Vinnytsia Oblast Yampil (Ukraine)
- Coordinates: 48°14′24″N 28°16′42″E
- Country: Ukraine
- Oblast: Vinnytsia Oblast
- Raion: Mohyliv-Podilskyi Raion
- Hromada: Yampil urban hromada
- First mentioned: 16th century
- City status: 1985

Government
  - Mayor: Oleksandr Kulbaba

Area
  - Total: 9.5 km^{2} (3.7 sq mi)

Population (2022)
  - Total: 10,679
- Time zone: UTC+2 (EET)
  - Summer (DST): UTC+3 (EEST)
- Postal code: 24500
- Area code: +380 4336

Yampil (Ukrainian: Ямпіль, IPA: [ˈjɑmpilʲ]) is a city located in Vinnytsia Oblast (province of central Ukraine). The city is the administrative center of the Yampil Raion (district), housing the district's local administration buildings. Population: 10,679 (2022 estimate).

== Name ==
In addition to the Ukrainian Ямпіль (Yampil), in other languages the name of the city is Romanian: Iampol and Russian: Ямполь.

== Geography ==
The city is located on the Dnister River, directly on the Ukrainian border with Moldova, near the commune of Cosăuți. It is located 7 mi (11 km) away from the Moldovan settlement Soroca.

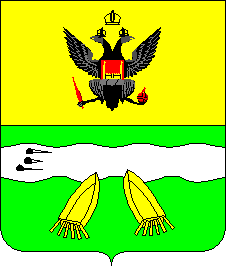
Yampil's old coat of arms, 1796.

== History ==
Yampil was first founded in the early 1600s. It was a private town, administratively located in the Bracław Voivodeship in the Lesser Poland Province of the Kingdom of Poland. In 1792, the Polish 6th and 8th National Cavalry Brigades were garrisoned in Jampol. It was annexed by Imperial Russia in the Second Partition of Poland in 1793.

In 1924, the settlement received the status of an urban-type settlement. The city also had a castle and river port.

=== Jewish history ===
Jews had lived in Yampil since at least the eighteenth century, and the community became a substantial part of the town's population during the nineteenth century. In 1802, 1,850 Jews were recorded in Yampil, while the Jewish population numbered approximately 2,800 by the end of the nineteenth century. The community maintained synagogues, batei midrash, a burial society and other communal institutions. In the early twentieth century, many Jews were involved in commerce and crafts, including the production of sugar and tobacco.

In 1900, Yampil's Jewish population was 2,823. The city center consisted of a large number of Jewish-owned buildings and four synagogues.

The community suffered during the upheavals accompanying the Russian Revolution and Russian Civil War, when Jews in Yampil were subjected to pogroms. Under Soviet rule, Jewish economic activity increasingly became organized through cooperatives. Two Yiddish-language schools operated in the town, one of them an agricultural vocational school, while most synagogues were eventually closed by the Soviet authorities. On the eve of the German invasion of the Soviet Union in 1941, approximately 1,700 Jews lived in Yampil.

=== The Holocaust ===
German forces occupied Yampil on 17 July 1941. Only a small proportion of the Jewish population had managed to escape before the occupation. In late July and August, members of Einsatzkommando 10a murdered approximately 50 Jews. On 1 September 1941, Yampil came under Romanian administration as part of Transnistria and became an important crossing and transit point for Jews deported from Bessarabia and Bukovina across the Dniester. Although deportees were initially prohibited from remaining in the town, approximately 500 Jewish craftsmen and other skilled workers settled there during November and December 1941.

A ghetto was established in the centre of Yampil in the autumn of 1941, in an area that had been predominantly Jewish before the war. Jews were required to wear a yellow Star of David and were subjected to forced labour, including women and children aged 14 and older. About a year later, the inhabitants were transferred to a new ghetto surrounded by barbed wire. They were generally permitted to leave only once a day to obtain water and food.

Conditions deteriorated after Romanian military authorities assumed tighter control of the town. The Romanian commander Dionisie Fotino ordered executions for violations of regulations and personally participated in killings. In November 1942, a large group of local Jews was deported to the Cariera de Piatră labour camp, where most were murdered. In January 1943, another 72 Jews were killed there. A Jewish council in Yampil was required to provide workers to the authorities, although it also organized relief activities with financial assistance from the Jewish relief committee in Bucharest, including a soup kitchen for needy residents.

Religious life continued to a limited extent within the ghetto. A small synagogue operated on the Sabbath and Jewish holidays, while additional minyanim met in private homes. In September 1943, the ghetto still contained 156 Jews deported from Bessarabia and 348 from Bukovina, in addition to surviving local Jews. As German forces approached during the Romanian retreat in March 1944, the remaining Jews left the ghetto and hid among peasants in nearby villages. Yampil was liberated by the Red Army on 17 March 1944.

=== Recent history ===
In 1985, it was named the administrative center of the surrounding Yampil Raion, one of the historical raions of Vinnytsia Oblast. The Yampil raion was abolished and its territory was merged into Mohyliv-Podilskyi Raion on 18 July 2020 as part of the administrative reform of Ukraine, which reduced the number of raions of Vinnytsia Oblast to six, and Yampil was no longer a raion-level administrative center after 1985.

== Demographics ==
In the 2001 Ukrainian Census, the city's population was 11,651. As of January 1, 2011 the city's population consisted of 11,302.

=== Language ===
Distribution of the population by native language according to the 2001 census:

Language	Percentage
Ukrainian	96.07%
Russian	3.10%
other/undecided	0.83%

== Twin towns – sister cities ==
Yampil is twinned with:

- Soroca, Moldova

== Notable people ==
- Israel Orenstein
