= List of Russian films =

A list of the most notable films produced in the Cinema of Russia. Russia, since beginning to produce films in the late 1890s, has experienced three political regimes; the Russian Empire, Pre-1917; the Soviet Union, 1917–1991; and the Russian Federation, 1991–present. Films ordered by year and decade of release are split for political purposes.

== Russian Federation (1992–present) ==
=== 1990s ===
- List of Russian films of 1992
- List of Russian films of 1993
- List of Russian films of 1994
- List of Russian films of 1995
- List of Russian films of 1996
- List of Russian films of 1997
- List of Russian films of 1998
- List of Russian films of 1999

=== 2000s ===
- List of Russian films of 2000
- List of Russian films of 2001
- List of Russian films of 2002
- List of Russian films of 2003
- List of Russian films of 2004
- List of Russian films of 2005
- List of Russian films of 2006
- List of Russian films of 2007
- List of Russian films of 2008
- List of Russian films of 2009

=== 2010s ===
- List of Russian films of 2010
- List of Russian films of 2011
- List of Russian films of 2012
- List of Russian films of 2013
- List of Russian films of 2014
- List of Russian films of 2015
- List of Russian films of 2016
- List of Russian films of 2017
- List of Russian films of 2018
- List of Russian films of 2019

=== 2020s ===
- List of Russian films of 2020
- List of Russian films of 2021
- List of Russian films of 2022
- List of Russian films of 2023
- List of Russian films of 2024
- List of Russian films of 2025
- List of Russian films of 2026
- List of Russian films of 2027
- List of Russian films of 2028
- List of Russian films of 2029

=== In production ===
- The Overcoat (Шинель)
