= List of Russian films of 2007 =

A list of films produced in Russia in 2007.

== 2007 ==
Title	Russian title	Director	Genre	Notes
Actress	Артистка	Stanislav Govorukhin	Comedy	
12	12	Nikita Mikhalkov	Crime	Remake of Twelve Angry Men
1612	1612	Vladimir Khotinenko	Historical fantasy	About the Time of Troubles
Alexandra	Александра	Aleksandr Sokurov	War Drama	Entered the 2007 Cannes Film Festival
The Apocalypse Code	Код апокалипсиса	Vadim Shmelyov	Action	
The Banishment	Изгнание	Andrey Zvyagintsev	Drama	Entered into the 2007 Cannes Film Festival
The Border	Граница 1918	Lauri Törhönen	War	
Branch of Lilac	Ветка сирени	Pavel Lungin	Drama	
Cargo 200	Груз 200	Aleksei Balabanov	Thriller	
Dead Daughters	Мёртвые дочери	Pavel Ruminov	Horror	
Election Day	День выборов	Oleg Fomin	Comedy	
Father	Отец	Ivan Solovov	Drama	
The Fit of Passion	Аффект	Maria Betkina and Arthur Tsymbalyuk	Drama	Short film
The Funeral Party	Ниоткуда с любовью, или Весёлые похороны	Vladimir Fokin	Drama	
Gagarin's Grandson	Внук космонавта	Tamara Vladimirtseva, Andrey Panin	Comedy	
Gloss	Глянец	Andrei Konchalovsky	Melodrama	
The Golden Snake	Золотой полоз	Vladimir Makeranets	Fantasy	
I’m Staying	Я остаюсь	Karen Oganesyan	Comedy	
The Irony of Fate 2	Ирония судьбы. Продолжение	Timur Bekmambetov	Romantic comedy	
Kilometer Zero	Нулевой километр	Pavel Sanaev	Action, Crime	
Kingdom of Crooked Mirrors	Королевство Кривых Зеркал	Alexander Igudin	Musical	
Life Unawares	Жизнь врасплох	Alexander Brunkovsky	Drama	
Moscow Chill	Мороз по коже	Chris Solimine	Thriller	Produced and written by Andrey Konchalovskiy
Tins	Консервы	Egor Konchalovsky	Action	
Mermaid	Русалка	Anna Melikyan	Comedy, drama	Entered into the 2007 Sundance Film Festival
Mongol	Монгол	Sergei Bodrov	Historical	Nominated for the 79th Academy Awards for Best Foreign Language Film as a submission from Kazakhstan.
Nothing Personal	Ничего личного	Larisa Sadilova	Drama	Entered into the 29th Moscow International Film Festival
Paragraph 78	Параграф 78	Mikhail Khleborodov	Action, Science fiction, Thriller	Based on a story by Ivan Okhlobystin.
The Return of the Musketeers, or The Treasures of Cardinal Mazarin	Возвращение мушкетёров, или Сокровища кардинала Мазарини	Georgi Yungvald-Khilkevich	Musical	
The Russian Game	Русская игра	Pavel Chukhray	Comedy	
Rybka	Рыбка	Sergei Ryabov	Animated film	
Shadowboxing 2: Revenge	Бой с тенью 2: Реванш	Anton Megerdichev	Sports drama	
Simple Things	Простые вещи	Alexei Popogrebski	Comedy drama	Nominated for the Golden Eagle Award for Best Motion Picture
Temptation	Искушение	Sergey Ashkenazi	Drama	
The Sovereign's Servant	Слуга государев	Oleg Ryaskov	Historical adventure	About the Great Northern War
Trackman	Путевой обходчик	Igor Shavlak	Slasher	
Travelling with Pets	Путешествие с домашними животными	Vera Storozheva	Drama	Won the Golden George at the 29th Moscow International Film Festival
Vanechka	Ванечка	Elena Nikolaeva	Drama	
Vice	Тиски	Valery Todorovsky	Action	
Viking	Викинг	Stanislav Mareev	War	
Waiting for a Miracle	В ожидании чуда	Yevgeny Bedarev	Comedy	

== See also ==
- 2007 in Russia
