= List of Russian films of 2003 =

A list of films produced in Russia in 2003 (see 2003 in film).

== 2003 ==
| Title | Russian title | Director | Genre | Notes |
|---|---|---|---|---|
| Amber Wings | Янтарные крылья | Andrey Razenkov | Drama | |
| And in the Morning They Woke Up | А поутру они проснулись | Sergey Nikonenko | Comedy | |
| Angel on the Curb | Ангел на обочине | Svetlana Stasenko | Crime | |
| Bless the Woman | Благословите женщину | Stanislav Govorukhin | Svetlana Khodchenkova | Drama |
| Bumer | Бумер | Pyotr Buslov | Crime | |
| Carmen | Кармен | Aleksandr Khvan | Drama | |
| Father and Son | Отец и сын | Alexander Sokurov | Drama | Entered into the 2003 Cannes Film Festival |
| The Forced March | Марш-бросок | Nikolai Stambula | Action | |
| Granny | Бабуся | Lidia Bobrova | Drama | |
| The Head | Голова | Svetlana Baskova | Sergey Pakhomov | Comedy |
| The Idiot | Идиот | Vladimir Bortko | Drama | |
| Little Longnose | Карлик Нос | Ilya Maksimov | Fairy tale | Animation, based on the story of the same name by Wilhelm Hauff |
| Old Women | Старухи | Gennady Sidorov | Drama | |
| On the Nameless Height | На безымянной высоте | Vyacheslav Nikiforov | War | |
| One Life | Жизнь одна | Vitaliy Moskalenko | Drama | |
| Peculiarities of National Politics | Особенности национальной политики | Dmitry Meskhiev, Yuri Konopkin | Comedy | |
| Poor Poor Paul | Бедный бедный Павел | Vitaly Melnikov | Viktor Sukhorukov | Historical |
| The Return | Возвращение | Andrey Zvyagintsev | Drama | Won the Golden Lion at the Venice Film Festival. |
| Roads to Koktebel | Коктебель | Boris Khlebnikov, Aleksey Popogrebskiy | Drama | Entered into the 25th Moscow International Film Festival |
| The Stroll | Прогулка | Alexei Uchitel | Drama | Entered into the 25th Moscow International Film Festival |
| The Suit | Шик | Bakhtyar Khudojnazarov | Drama | |
| White Gold | Белое золото | Viktor Ivanov | Action | |

== See also ==
- 2003 in Russia
