= 2004 in Russia =

- Decades: 1980s; 1990s; 2000s; 2010s; 2020s
- See also: History of Russia; Timeline of Russian history; List of years in Russia

Events from the year 2004 in Russia.

== Incumbents ==
- President: Vladimir Putin
- Prime Minister: Mikhail Kasyanov to February 24 Viktor Khristenko as Acting Prime Minister to March 5 Mikhail Fradkov

=== Governors ===
- Amur Oblast: Leonid Korotkov (ER)
- Arkhangelsk Oblast: Anatoly Yefremov (ER, until April 14), Nikolai Kiselev (Independent / ER ally, starting April 14)
- Astrakhan Oblast: Anatoly Guzhvin (ER, until August 17), Alexander Zhilkin (ER, starting August 17)
- Belgorod Oblast: Yevgeny Savchenko (ER)
- Bryansk Oblast: Yury Lodkin (CPRF, until December 20), Nikolay Denin (ER, starting December 20)
- Chelyabinsk Oblast: Pyotr Sumin (ER)
- Irkutsk Oblast: Boris Govorin (ER)
- Ivanovo Oblast: Vladimir Tikhonov (CPRF)
- Kaliningrad Oblast: Vladimir Yegorov (ER)
- Kaluga Oblast: Anatoly Artamonov (ER)
- Kemerovo Oblast: Aman Tuleyev (ER)
- Kirov Oblast: Vladimir Shaklein (ER)
- Kostroma Oblast: Viktor Shershunov (CPRF)
- Kurgan Oblast: Oleg Bogomolov (ER)
- Kursk Oblast: Aleksandr Mikhailov (CPRF)
- Leningrad Oblast: Valery Serdyukov (ER)
- Lipetsk Oblast: Oleg Korolyov (ER)
- Magadan Oblast: Nikolai Dudov (ER)
- Moscow Oblast: Boris Gromov (ER)
- Murmansk Oblast: Yuri Yevdokimov (ER)
- Nizhny Novgorod Oblast: Gennady Khodyrev (ER)
- Novgorod Oblast: Mikhail Prusak (ER)
- Novosibirsk Oblast: Viktor Tolokonsky (ER)
- Omsk Oblast: Leonid Polezhayev (ER)
- Orenburg Oblast: Alexey Chernyshev (ER)
- Oryol Oblast: Yegor Stroyev (ER)
- Penza Oblast: Vasily Bochkarev (ER)
- Pskov Oblast: Yevgeny Mikhailov (ER, until December 5), Mikhail Kuznetsov (Sovereign Russia / ER ally, starting December 5)
- Rostov Oblast: Vladimir Chub (ER)
- Ryazan Oblast: Vyacheslav Lyubimov (CPRF, until April 12), Georgy Shpak (Rodina, starting April 12)
- Sakhalin Oblast: Ivan Malakhov (ER)
- Samara Oblast: Konstantin Titov (ER)
- Saratov Oblast: Dmitry Ayatskov (ER)
- Smolensk Oblast: Viktor Maslov (ER)
- Tambov Oblast: Oleg Betin (ER)
- Tomsk Oblast: Viktor Kress (ER)
- Tula Oblast: Vasily Starodubtsev (CPRF)
- Tver Oblast: Dmitry Zelenin (ER)
- Tyumen Oblast: Sergey Sobyanin (ER)
- Ulyanovsk Oblast: Vladimir Shamanov (ER, until November 22), Aleksei Chernyshov (Acting, November 22–December 26), Sergey Morozov (ER, starting December 26)
- Vladimir Oblast: Nikolay Vinogradov (CPRF)
- Volgograd Oblast: Nikolai Maksyuta (CPRF)
- Vologda Oblast: Vyacheslav Pozgalyov (ER)
- Voronezh Oblast: Vladimir Kulakov (ER)
- Yaroslavl Oblast: Anatoly Lisitsyn (ER)
- Jewish Autonomous Oblast: Nikolay Volkov (ER)

== Events ==
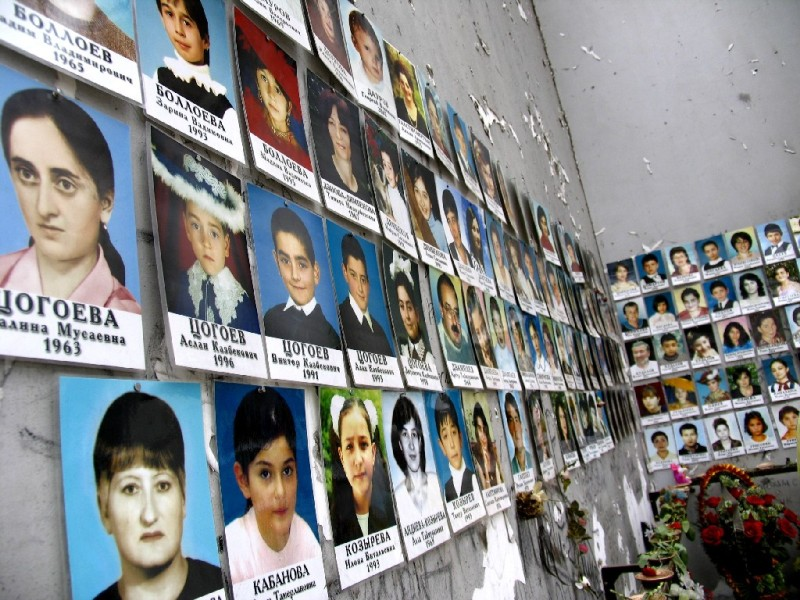
Beslan school siege: photos of the victims on the walls of the former SNO in Beslan

- 14 March
  - Vladimir Putin wins the presidential election and secures his second term as president.
  - The Moscow Manege fire.
- 16 March - Arkhangelsk explosion.
- 9 May - Assassination of the Pro-Russian Chechen President Akhmad Kadyrov in Grozny.
- 13 August–29 August - Russia competes at the Summer Olympics in Athens, Greece, and wins 27 gold, 27 silver and 38 bronze medals.
- 29 August - Alu Alkhanov succeeds Kadyrov as President of Chechnya following elections.
- 1 September - Beslan school siege: Chechen separatists take over 1,000 hostages at a school in North Ossetia–Alania.
- 3 September - Beslan school siege: Russian troops storm the school. As a result of the siege, over 330 people, including 186 children, were killed.
- 26 December - 9 Russians are among the victims of the 2004 Indian Ocean tsunami.

=== Sport ===
2004 Summer Olympics - Afina - 3rd place

=== Undated ===
- The Alexander Nevsky prize, a Russian national historical-literary competition is established.

== Births ==
- 28 March – Anna Shcherbakova, figure skater
- 14 April – Anastasia Tarakanova, figure skater
- 23 June – Alexandra Trusova, figure skater
- 6 December – Lala Kramarenko, rhythmic gymnast

== Notable deaths ==
=== February ===
- 13 February - Zelimkhan Yandarbiyev, 52, Chechen politician.
- 22 February - David Neiman, 82, Russian-born American rabbi, archaeologist and theologian.

=== May ===
- 9 May - Akhmad Kadyrov
- 22 May - Mikhail Voronin, gymnast (born 1945)

=== June ===
- 11 June – Galina Serdyukovskaya, hygienist, academic and politician (born 1921)

== See also ==
- List of Russian films of 2004
