= Alexander Nevsky (disambiguation) =

Alexander Nevsky (1221–1263) was a Russian statesman and military hero, serving as Prince of Novgorod, Grand Prince of Kiev and Grand Prince of Vladimir

Alexander Nevsky may also refer to:

== People ==
- Aleksandr Nevskiy (athlete) (born 1958), Russian decathlete
- Alexander Nevsky (actor) (born 1971), Russian actor, writer and director
- Alex Nevsky (musician) (born 1986), French Canadian singer-songwriter

== Art, entertainment, and media ==
- Alexander Nevsky (film), a 1938 film by Sergei Eisenstein
  - Alexander Nevsky (Prokofiev), the score by Sergei Prokofiev for the film, later reworked into a cantata
- Life of Alexander Nevsky, a literary monument
- Life of Alexander Nevsky (illuminated manuscript), a 16th-century illuminated manuscript
- Alex Nevsky (Crimson Dynamo), a third Crimson Dynamo character

== Awards and honorable recognitions ==
- Alexander Nevsky (prize), a Russian national annual historical-literary competition
- Order of Alexander Nevsky, an order of merit of the Russian Federation
- Order of Saint Alexander Nevsky, an order of chivalry of the Russian Empire

== Buildings and structures ==
- Alexander Nevsky Bridge, in St. Petersburg, Russia
- Alexander Nevsky Cathedral (disambiguation), the name of various cathedrals
- Alexander Nevsky Church, in Copenhagen
- Alexander Nevsky Lavra, monastery in St. Petersburg, Russia
- Alexander Nevsky Square, in St. Petersburg, Russia

== Transport ==
- Russian ship Alexander Nevsky, a list of ships named for the saint
  - Russian frigate Alexander Nevsky, a naval frigate lost at sea near the Danish coast in 1868
  - Icebreaker St. Alexander Nevsky, later renamed Lenin
  - Alexander Nevsky, a Sverdlov-class cruiser
  - Russian submarine Alexander Nevsky (K-550), fourth generation Borei-class submarine which sea trials started at 2011
- Sikorsky Alexander Nevsky, see List of aircraft (Si)
