= List of Russian films of 1993 =

A list of films produced in Russia in 1993 (see 1993 in film).

== 1993 ==
Title	Russian title	Director	Cast	Genre	Notes
Anna: 6 - 18	Анна: от 6 до 18	Nikita Mikhalkov	Anna Mikhalkova	Documentary	
Breakfast with a View to the Elbrus Mountains	Завтрак с видом на Эльбрус	Nikolai Maletsky	Igor Kostolevsky	Drama	
Children of Iron Gods	Дети чугунных богов	Tamás Tóth	Yevgeny Sidikhin	Drama	
Devil, I'm Bored	Мне скучно, бес	Yury Borisov	Oleg Borisov	Fantasy	
Dreams	Сны	Karen Shakhnazarov, Alexander Borodyansky	Amaliya Mordvinova	Comedy	
Drumroll	Барабаниада	Sergei Ovcharov	Aleksandr Polovtsev	Comedy	
Engineering Red	Конструктор красного цвета	Andrey Yi	Anna Semkina	Horror	
Makarov	Макаров	Vladimir Khotinenko	Sergey Makovetsky	Drama	
My Family Treasure	Сокровище моей семьи	Rolfe Kanefsky, Edward Staroselsky	Dee Wallace Stone, Theodore Bikel, Bitty Schram, Alex Vincent, Melissa Perez, Bill Weber, V. Zakhartchenko, Boris Krutonog	Adventure comedy drama	American-Russian co-production
Nastya	Настя	Georgiy Daneliya	Polina Kutepova	Comedy	
Prediction	Предсказание	Eldar Ryazanov	Oleg Basilashvili	Romance	
Prison Romance	Тюремный романс	Yevgeni Tatarsky	Aleksandr Abdulov	Drama	
The Gray Wolves	Серые волки	Igor Gostev	Rolan Bykov	Action	
Window to Paris	Окно в Париж	Yuri Mamin	Sergey Dreyden	Comedy	
You Are My Only Love	Ты у меня одна	Dmitry Astrakhan	Aleksandr Zbruyev	Drama	
You Exist	Ты есть…	Vladimir Makeranets	Anna Kamenkova	Drama	

== See also ==
- 1993 in Russia
