= Ágota Kristóf =

Hungarian writer (1935–2011)

- Born: 30 October 1935; Csikvánd, Hungary
- Died: 27 July 2011 (aged 75); Neuchâtel, Switzerland

Ágota Kristóf (Hungarian: Kristóf Ágota; 30 October 1935 – 27 July 2011) was a Hungarian writer who lived in Switzerland and wrote in French. Kristóf received the "European prize" (Prix Europe, a.k.a. Prix Littéraire Europe, Grand Prix Littéraire Européen) from ADELF, the association of Francophone authors, for Le Grand Cahier (1986; later translated into English as The Notebook). It was followed by two sequels which are collectively The Notebook Trilogy. She won the 2001 Gottfried Keller Award in Switzerland and the Austrian State Prize for European Literature in 2008.

== Early life ==
Ágota Kristóf was born in Csikvánd, Hungary on 30 October 1935. Her parents were Kálmán Kristóf, an elementary school teacher and Antónia Turchányi, a professor of arts. At the age of 21, she had to leave her country when the Hungarian Revolution of 1956 was suppressed by the Soviet military. She, her husband (who used to be her history teacher at school) and their 4-month-old daughter escaped to Neuchâtel in Switzerland. After five years of loneliness and exile, she quit her work in a factory and left her husband. She started studying French and began to write novels in that language.

== Career ==
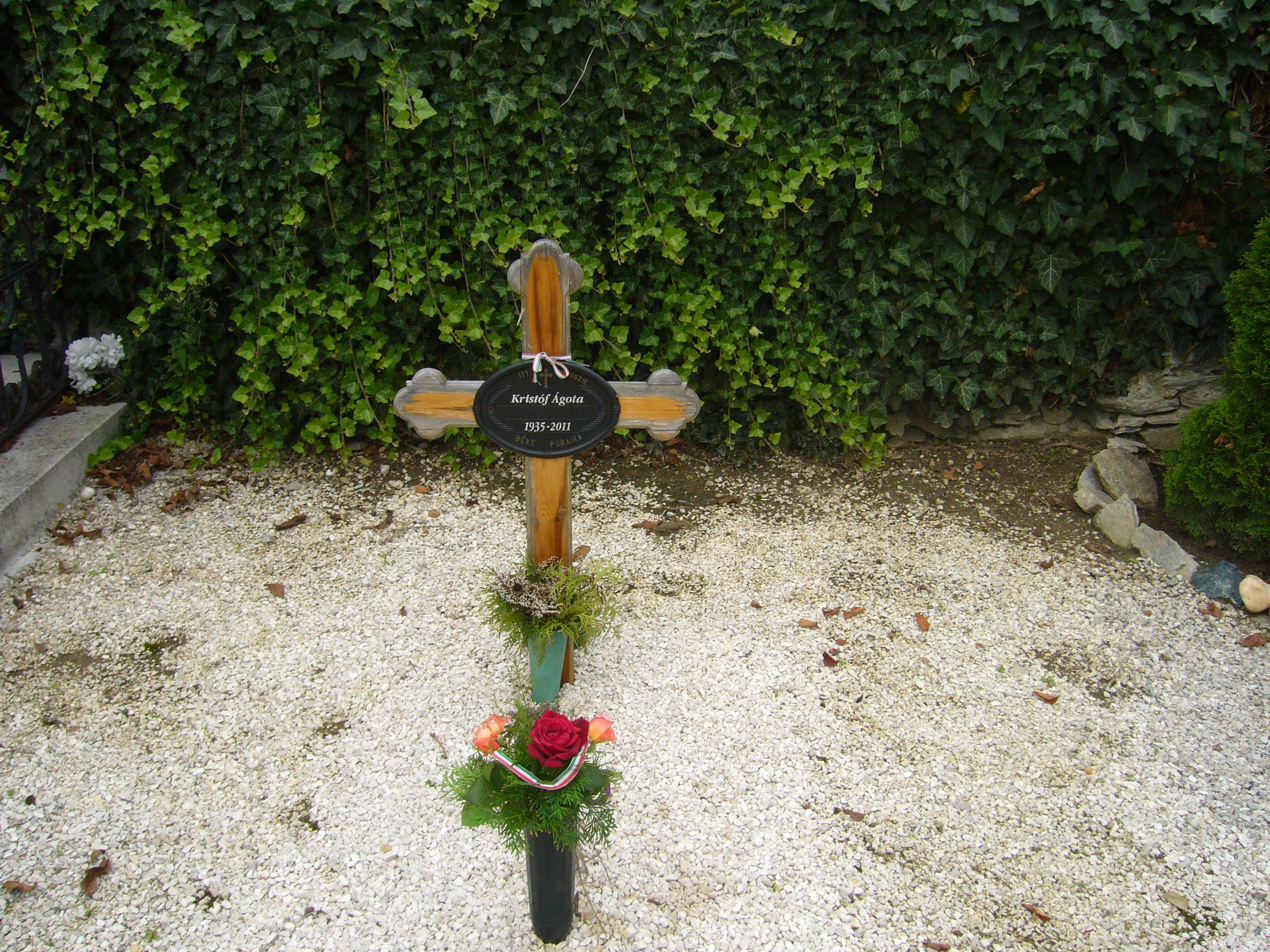
Ágota Kristóf grave

Kristóf's first steps as a writer were in the realm of poetry and theater (John et Joe, Un rat qui passe), aspects of her writing that did not have as great an impact as her prose. In 1986 Kristóf's first novel, The Notebook, appeared. It was the beginning of The Notebook Trilogy. The sequel titled The Proof came two years later. The third part was published in 1991 under the title The Third Lie. The most important themes of this trilogy are war and destruction, love and loneliness, promiscuousness, desperation, and attention-seeking sexual encounters, desire and loss, and the dichotomies truth and fiction.

The Notebook was translated into more than 40 languages. In 1995 she published a new novel, Yesterday. Kristóf also wrote a book called L'analphabète (in English The Illiterate), published in 2004. This is an autobiographical text. It explores her love of reading as a young child, and we travel with her to boarding school, over the border to Austria and then to Switzerland. Forced to leave her country due to the failure of the anti-communist rebellion, she hopes for a better life in Zürich.

In 2006, two pieces were published together by Editions Zoé, "Où es-tu Mathias?" followed by "Line, le temps". The names Mathias and Line are from her previous novels. The majority of her works were published by Editions du Seuil in Paris. She died on 27 July 2011 in her Neuchâtel home. Her estate is archived in the Swiss Literary Archives in Bern.

== Bibliography ==
=== Fiction ===
==== The Book of Lies trilogy ====
Also known as The Notebook Trilogy:

1. Le Grand Cahier (1986). The Notebook, trans. Alan Sheridan (Grove/Methuen, 1988)
2. La Preuve (1988). The Proof, trans. David Watson (Grove/Methuen, 1991)
3. Le Troisième Mensonge (1991). The Third Lie, trans. Marc Romano (Grove, 1996)

==== Novellas ====
- Hier (1995). Yesterday, trans. David Watson (Random House of Canada, 1997). ISBN 978-0-09-926807-9

==== Short story collections ====
- C'est égal (2005). I Don't Care, trans. Chris Andrews (New Directions, 2024) – 25 short stories
- Où es-tu Mathias ? (Where are you, Mathias?) (2006) – 2 short stories

=== Non-fiction ===
- L'Analphabète (2004). The Illiterate, trans. Nina Bogin (CB Editions, 2014). ISBN 978-0-9573266-2-0

=== Plays ===
- L'Heure grise, et autres pièces (1998)
- Le Monstre, et autres pièces (2007)

=== Poems ===
- Clous: Poèmes hongrois et français (2016). Translations by Maria Maïlat.

=== English compilations ===
- The Notebook, The Proof, The Third Lie: Three Novels (Grove Press, 1997). ISBN 978-0-8021-3506-3. Also published as:
  - The Book of Lies (Minerva, 1997). ISBN 978-0-7493-9760-9
  - The Notebook Trilogy (Text Publishing, 2016) ISBN 978-1-925240-89-4
- Collected Plays (Oberon Books, 2018). ISBN 978-1-78682-074-7. Includes nine plays translated by Bart Smet: John and Joe, The Lift Key, A Passing Rat, The Grey Hour or the Last Client, The Monster, The Road, The Epidemic, The Atonement, and Line, of times

== Awards and honors ==
- 1986: Prix européen de l’ADELF
- 1988: Ruban de la Francophonie
- 1992: Prix du Livre Inter
- 1998: Prix Alberto Moravia
- 2001: Gottfried-Keller-Preis
- 2005: Schiller Prize for her entire body of work
- 2006: Preis der SWR-Bestenliste
- 2008: Austrian State Prize for European Literature
- 2009: Prix de l'institut neuchâtelois
- 2011: Kossuth Prize

== In popular culture ==
The video game Mother 3 (2006) was influenced by The Notebook's major themes. Main characters Lucas and Claus are named after the book's narrators. The game's designer, Shigesato Itoi, a published author in his own right, compared the novel favorably to an RPG. American novelist Stephen Beachy has named Kristóf as an influence on his novel boneyard.

Burning in the Wind (2002) is a film based on the novel Hier (Yesterday), directed by Silvio Soldini. Le Continent K. (1998) and Agota Kristof, 9 ans plus tard ... (2006) are two short documentaries about Ágota Kristóf directed by Eric Bergkraut. The Notebook was adapted into a film in 2013 by director János Szász. In 2014, the novel was adapted for the stage by British contemporary theatre company, Forced Entertainment.
