= The Notebook (2013 Hungarian film) =

2013 film

- Film poster
- Directed by: János Szász
- Written by: Agota Kristof; András Szekér; János Szász
- Starring: András Gyémánt; László Gyémánt
- Cinematography: Christian Berger
- Release dates: 3 July 2013 (Karlovy IFF); 19 September 2013 (Hungary)
- Running time: 110 minutes
- Countries: Hungary; Germany; Austria; France
- Languages: Hungarian; German
- Box office: $85,621

The Notebook (Hungarian: A nagy füzet) is a 2013 drama film co-written and directed by János Szász. It is based on the first novel, of the same name, of the 1986 prize winning The Notebook Trilogy by Ágota Kristóf.

== Plot ==
Two twins are sent to a remote village where their grandmother lives so they can stay safe during the war. However they find out the village may not be as safe as they think when they are beaten by the village's residents.

== Cast ==
- András Gyémánt as One
- László Gyémánt as Other
- Gyöngyvér Bognár as Mother
- Piroska Molnár as Grandmother
- András Réthelyi as Orderly
- Ulrich Thomsen as Officer
- Orsolya Tóth as Harelip
- János Derzsi as Sutor
- Péter Andorai as Deacon
- Miklós Székely B. as Old homeless
- Krisztián Kovács as Deserter soldier
- Ákos Köszegi as Hungarian officer
- Ulrich Matthes as Father

== Nominations and awards ==
The film was first released at the 48th Karlovy Vary International Film Festival in July 2013, where it won the Crystal Globe, as well as the Label Europa Cinemas award. In October of the same year it received a Special Mention at the Chicago International Film Festival.

The film was also screened in the Contemporary World Cinema section of the 2013 Toronto International Film Festival. The film was selected as the Hungarian entry for the Best Foreign Language Film at the 86th Academy Awards, making the January shortlist.

== See also ==
- List of submissions to the 86th Academy Awards for Best Foreign Language Film
- List of Hungarian submissions for the Academy Award for Best Foreign Language Film
