= List of Russian films of 1997 =

A list of films produced in Russia in 1997 (see 1997 in film).

== 1997 ==
| Title | Russian title | Director | Cast | Genre | Notes |
|---|---|---|---|---|---|
| American Bet | Американка | Dmitry Meskhiev | Natalya Danilova | Romance | |
| A Little Princess | Маленькая принцесса | Vladimir Grammatikov | Anastasia Meskova | Drama | |
| Brother | Брат | Aleksei Balabanov | Sergei Bodrov Jr. | Crime drama | |
| Cops and Robbers | Полицейские и воры | Nikolay Dostal | Sergey Batalov | Crime comedy | |
| Country of the Deaf | Страна глухих | Valery Todorovsky | Chulpan Khamatova | Crime | |
| Dandelion Wine | Вино из одуванчиков | Igor Apasyan | Innokenti Smoktunovsky | Drama | |
| Don Quixote Returns | Дон Кихот возвращается | Vasily Livanov | Armen Dzhigarkhanyan | Comedy | |
| Don't Play the Fool... | Не валяй дурака... | Valeri Chikov | Mikhail Yevdokimov | Comedy | |
| In That Land... | В той стране | Lidia Bobrova | Dmitri Klopov | Drama | |
| Mother and Son | Мать и сын | Aleksandr Sokurov | Aleksei Ananishnov | Drama | |
| Schizophrenia | Шизофрения | Viktor Sergeyev | Armen Dzhigarkhanyan | Crime | |
| Snake Spring | Змеиный источник | Nikolai Lebedev | Sergei Makhovikov | Crime thriller | |
| Sympathy Seeker | Сирота казанская | Vladimir Mashkov | Yelena Shevchenko | Comedy | |
| Tax Collector | Мытарь | Oleg Fomin | Oleg Fomin | Action | |
| The Circus Burned Down, and the Clowns Have Gone | Цирк сгорел, и клоуны разбежались | Vladimir Bortko | Nikolai Karachentsov | Drama | |
| The Magical Portrait | Волшебный портрет | Gennady Vasilyev | Sergey Shnyryov | Drama | |
| The Thief | Вор | Pavel Chukhray | Vladimir Mashkov | Drama | |
| Three Stories | Три истории | Kira Muratova | Sergey Makovetskiy | Comedy | |
| Tsarevich Alexei | Царевич Алексе | Vitaly Melnikov | Aleksey Zuyev | Drama | |
| War is Over. Please Forget... | Война окончена. Забудьте… | Valeriy Kharchenko | Aleksey Dyakov | Drama | |

== See also ==
- 1997 in Russia
