= Nothing Personal =

Nothing Personal or Nothin' Personal may refer to:

== Film and TV ==
- Nothing Personal (1980 film), starring Donald Sutherland
- Nothing Personal (1995 film), by Thaddeus O'Sullivan
- Nothing Personal (2007 film), a Russian film
- Nothing Personal (2009 film), by Urszula Antoniak
- Nothing Personal (TV series), a true-crime documentary television series hosted by Steven Schirripa
- "Nothing Personal" (Agents of S.H.I.E.L.D.), a 2014 TV episode
- "Nothing Personal" (Between the Lines), a 1992 TV episode
- "Nothing Personal" (Homicide: Life on the Street), a 1995 TV episode

== Literature ==
- Nothing Personal (play), a 2011 play David Williamson
- "Nothing Personal", a one-act play in Hugh Leonard's trilogy Suburb of Babylon

== Music ==
=== Albums ===
- Nothing Personal (Delbert McClinton album), 2001
- Nothing Personal (All Time Low album), 2009
- Nothing Personal, a 1958 album by George Melly
- Nothin Personal, a 2016 album by Cozz

=== Songs ===
- "Nothing Personal", a composition by Don Grolnick featured on the album Michael Brecker (1987)
- "Nothin' Personal", a 2002 song by The Rowan Brothers from Crazy People
- "Nothin' Personal", a 1998 song by the Dust Junkys
