= The Notebook Trilogy =

Trilogy of novels by Ágota Kristóf

- 1997 paperback book cover
- The Notebook (1986), The Proof (1988), and The Third Lie (1991)
- Author: Ágota Kristóf
- Translator: Alan Sheridan, David Watson, and Marc Romano
- Country: France
- Language: French
- Publisher: Grove Press
- Published in English: 1997
- Media type: Print, E-book, Audio
- No. of books: Three in one volume
- OCLC: 36739625
- Website: Publisher's website

The Notebook Trilogy is a collection of books by Hungarian writer Ágota Kristóf, written in French. It tells the story of initially unnamed identical twin brothers who live with their grandmother in a small village and border town of a war-torn country during an unspecified war. The boys express a naïve ethical stance that is simultaneously amoral and generous. The second and third books reveal the names of the twins as Claus and Lucas. The setting in the first and second novels is most likely a fictitious Hungarian village and the unspecified war is believed to be World War II.

== Plot summary ==
Twin boys Claus and Lucas go with their mother to live with their grandmother in the countryside. While living in their grandmother's village, the boys witness and experience a number of horrors related both to war and to the darkness that exists within those around them. Unburdened by moral precepts, the brothers survive using their pragmatism and naivety.

== Entries ==
- The Notebook (Le Grand Cahier; 1986)
- The Proof (La Preuve; 1988)
- The Third Lie (Le Troisième Mensonge; 1991)

== Structure and style ==
The novels were originally written in French. The first novel is written in a stark, laconic style, partly on account of Kristóf's unfamiliarity with the French language when writing it. The second and third novels use more literary language as Kristóf became more comfortable writing in French.

The setting, Hungary during World War II, is based on Kristóf's own life experiences. It deals with the prevalence of violence and deprivation in war.

The trilogy is characterized by a surreal metafictional quality. Its simple direct language brings the harsh circumstances of life in Europe during the war into relief. It is simultaneously objectively descriptive and contradictory, filtered through the perspective of the boys. The story includes a succession of "slippery doubles, falsehoods, and jolting narrative tricks."

Critics have compared it to fairy tales. The comparison to Brothers Grimm fairy tales stems from the boys' abandonment by their mother, who is forced to leave them with their grandmother on the outskirts of a village. The opening premise is particularly similar to the fairy tale Hansel and Gretel, with their grandmother playing the role of the "witch".

== Publication history ==
Each book of the trilogy was written in Switzerland, where Kristof resided, and published in France, in the following sequence: Le Grand Cahier (The Notebook; 1986), La Preuve (The Proof; 1988), Le Troisième Mensonge (The Third Lie; 1991). The volumes of the trilogy were later translated into English. The Notebook was translated by Alan Sheridan in 1991, The Proof by David Watson in 1988, and The Third Lie by Marc Romano in 1996. Grove Press brought together and published the translated trilogy into one volume in 1997.

== Reception ==
Slovenian philosopher Slavoj Žižek described the book as life-changing, and discussed the boys' spontaneity and abandonment of typical morals. To Žižek, the boys are "thoroughly immoral – they lie, blackmail, kill – yet they stand for authentic ethical naivety at its purest."

Sydney Morning Herald critic Andrew Reimer considered the trilogy to be singularly original.

== Adaptations ==
The first book of the trilogy, The Notebook, was made into a 2013 Hungarian drama film directed by János Szász.

This work is also a literary inspiration behind Shigesato Itoi's RPG Mother 3.

== See also ==
- The Notebook (2013 Hungarian film)
