= List of Russian films of 2004 =

A list of films produced in Russia in 2004 (see 2004 in film).

== 2004 ==
Title	Russian title	Director	Cast	Genre	Notes
72 Meters	72 метра	Vladimir Khotinenko	Sergei Makovetsky	Drama	
Arie	Арье	Roman Kachanov	Jerzy Stuhr, Juozas Budraitis, Angelina Chernova	Drama	
Countdown	Личный номер	Yevgeny Lavrentyev	Aleksey Makarov, Louise Lombard	Action	
Dad or Papa	Папа	Vladimir Mashkov	Vladimir Mashkov, Egor Beroev	War Drama	Entered into the 26th Moscow International Film Festival
A Driver for Vera	Водитель для Веры	Pavel Chukhraj	Igor Petrenko	Drama	
Goddess: How I fell in Love	Богиня: Как я полюбила	Renata Litvinova	Renata Litvinova, Maksim Sukhanov	Drama	
The French Guy	Француз	Vera Storozheva	Mikhail Efremov, Ekaterina Filippova	Comedy	
Long Farewell	Долгое прощание	Sergei Ursuliak	Polina Agureeva, Andrei Schchennikov	Drama	
Harvest Time	Время жатвы	Marina Razbezhkina	Lyudmila Motornaya	Drama	Entered into the 26th Moscow International Film Festival
It's Russian	Русское	Aleksandr Veledinsky	Andrey Chadov, Olga Arntgolts	Comedy	
Mars	Марс	Anna Melikian	Gosha Kutsenko	Drama	
Masha	Маша	Sergey Tkachev	Mariya Shalayeva, Dmitry Shevchenko	Comedy	
Moth Games	Игры мотыльков	Andrey Proshkin	Aleksey Chadov, Mariya Zvonaryova	Drama	
My Step Brother Frankenstein	Мой сводный брат Франкенштейн	Valery Todorovsky	Leonid Yarmolnik, Daniil Spivakovsky	Drama	
Night Watch	Ночной дозор	Timur Bekmambetov	Konstantin Khabensky, Vladimir Menshov, Valeri Zolotukhin	Fantasy	Based on the book of the same name by Sergey Lukyanenko. The film was selected as the Russian entry for the Best Foreign Language Film at the 77th Academy Awards but it didn't make the final shortlist.
On Upper Maslovka Street	На Верхней Масловке	Konstantin Khudyakov	Alisa Freindlikh, Yevgeny Mironov	Drama	
Our Own	Свои	Dmitri Meskhiyev	Konstantin Khabenskiy, Sergey Garmash, Bohdan Stupka	Drama	
Ragin	Рагин	Kirill Serebrennikov	Aleksei Guskov, Aleksandr Galibin	Drama	
The Recruiter	Шиза	Gulshat Omarova	Sergei Bodrov, Gulshat Omarova	Crime	
Star Wars: Storm in the Glass	Звёздные войны: Буря в стакане		Dmitry Puchkov	Parody	
The Tuner	Настройщик	Kira Muratova	Alla Demidova, Renata Litvinova, Nina Ruslanova	Drama	
You I Love	Я люблю тебя	Olga Stolpovskaja, Dmitry Troitsky	Damir Badmaev, Lyubov Tolkalina	Comedy	

== See also ==
- 2004 in Russia
