= List of Russian films of 1999 =

A list of films produced in Russia in 1999 (see 1999 in film).

== 1999 ==
Title	Russian title	Director	Cast	Genre	Notes
8 ½ $	Восемь с половиной долларов	Grigori Konstantinopolsky	Ivan Okhlobystin	Comedy	
Chinese Tea Set	Китайскій сервизъ	Vitaly Moskalenko	Oleg Yankovsky	Comedy	
Fara	Фара	Abay Karpykov	Farhat Abdraimov	Drama	
Four Hands Dinner	Ужин в четыре руки	Mikhail Kozakov	Anatoliy Grachyov	Drama	
It Is Easy to Die	Умирать легко	Aleksandr Khvan	Polina Kutepova	Action	
Luna Papa	Лунный папа	Bakhtyar Khudojnazarov	Chulpan Khamatova	Comedy	
Moloch	Молох	Alexander Sokurov	Leonid Mozgovoy	Biographical	
Mother	Мама	Denis Yevstigneyev	Nonna Mordyukova	Drama	
Quadrille	Кадриль	Viktor Titov	Oleg Tabakov	Comedy	
Strastnoy Boulevard	Страстной бульвар	Vladimir Khotinenko	Sergey Koltakov	Drama	
The Admirer	Поклонник	Nikolai Lebedev	Marina Cherepukhina	Crime thriller	
The Barracks	Барак	Valeriy Ogorodnikov	Irina Senotova	Drama	
The Green Elephant	Зелёный слоник	Svetlana Baskova	Sergey Pakhomov	Horror	
The Iron Heel of Oligarchy	Железная пята олигархии	Aleksandr Bashirov	Aleksandr Bashirov	Drama	
The President and His Granddaughter	Президент и его внучка	Tigran Keosayan	Oleg Tabakov	Comedy	
Voroshilov Sharpshooter	Ворошиловский стрелок	Stanislav Govorukhin	Mikhail Ulyanov	Action	
Women's Property	Женская собственность	Dmitry Meskhiev	Konstantin Khabensky	Drama	

== See also ==
- 1999 in Russia
