= Opium: Diary of a Madwoman =

2007 film

- Directed by: János Szász
- Written by: Géza Csáth; András Szekér; János Szász
- Starring: Ulrich Thomsen
- Cinematography: Tibor Máthé
- Release date: 4 February 2007
- Running time: 90 minutes
- Country: Hungary
- Language: Hungarian

Opium: Diary of a Madwoman (Hungarian: Ópium: Egy elmebeteg nő naplója) is a 2007 Hungarian drama film directed by János Szász. It was entered into the 29th Moscow International Film Festival where Kirsti Stubø won the Silver George for Best Actress.

== Cast ==
- Ulrich Thomsen as Dr. Brenner
- Kirsti Stubø as Gizella
- Zsolt László as Professor Winter
- Enikö Börcsök as Sister Hortenzia
- Gyöngyvér Bognár as Gizella's Room Mate
- Roland Rába
