= The Children of USSR =

2005 film

- Film poster
- Directed by: Felix Gerchikov
- Written by: Ayidin Ali-Zade; Felix Gerchikov
- Produced by: Mirit Tovi
- Starring: Daniel Bruck
- Cinematography: Amnon Zlayet
- Release date: 5 June 2005
- Running time: 96 minutes
- Country: Israel
- Languages: Hebrew; Russian

The Children of USSR (Hebrew: ילדי СССР, translit. Yaldei SSSR) is a 2005 Israeli drama film directed by Felix Gerchikov, and produced as part of the Israeli Project Greenlight reality show, which Gerchikov won. It was entered into the 29th Moscow International Film Festival. It won an Anat Pirchi Drama Award at the 22nd Jerusalem Film Festival in 2005, and the Best Israeli Film award at the 5th Annual Eilat International Film Festival in 2007.

== Synopsis ==
The film tells the story of Slava, whose wife throws him out of their home, separating him from their infant son. Slava is forced to live with Victor, a delicatessen owner and former football coach. Victor convinces Slava to form a football team and participate in a neighborhood tournament with the aim of winning the cash prize offered to the tournament winners. Slava and his friends, Vitali - a Ukrainian foreign worker, Kastil ("Crutches") - a high school student, Mukhtar - a Caucasian involved in criminal activity, and Banuchka - a hard drug addict, form a team, which is joined by an Ethiopian player.

== Cast ==
- Daniel Bruck as Slava
- Salim Dau as Policeman
- Vladimir Freedman as Viktor the Coach
- Vitali Friedland as Kostyl'
- Tamara Klayngon as Svetlana
- Arthur Marchenko as Banochka
- Shaul Mizrahi as Mashiah
- Niko Nikolaev as Vitaly
- Ygal Resnik as Mucha
- Sirak M. Sabahat as Nisim
- Anna Stephan as Oksana
