= The Witman Boys =

1997 film

- Directed by: János Szász
- Written by: János Szász; Géza Csáth; András Szeredás
- Produced by: Ferenc Kardos
- Starring: Maia Morgenstern
- Cinematography: Tibor Máthé
- Edited by: Anna Kornis
- Release date: 21 March 1997
- Running time: 99 minutes
- Country: Hungary
- Language: Hungarian

The Witman Boys (Hungarian: Witman fiúk) is a 1997 Hungarian drama film co-written and directed by János Szász. It was screened in the Un Certain Regard section at the 1997 Cannes Film Festival. At the 20th Moscow International Film Festival the film won the FIPRESCI Prize and Szász won the Silver St. George for Best Director. The film was selected as the Hungarian entry for the Best Foreign Language Film at the 70th Academy Awards, but was not accepted as a nominee.

== Cast ==
- Maia Morgenstern - Mrs. Witman
- Alpár Fogarasi - János Witman
- Szabolcs Gergely - Ernő Witman
- Lajos Kovács - Dénes Witman
- Dominika Ostalowska - Irén
- Péter Andorai - Endre Tálay
- István Holl - Mihály Szladek
- Juli Sándor - Eszti
- Péter Blaskó - Elegant Gentleman
- György Barkó - Dissector
- Tamás Kalmár - Corpse Carrier
- Zsolt Porcza - Zöldi
- Ákos Horváth - Physical Instructor
- Lajos Szücs - Guest
- Sándor Kassay - Person on Duty
- Arnold Kilin - Twin

== Controversy ==
In 1997, the film won the Grand Prix at Film Fest Gent. However, jury member Gina Lollobrigida publicly distanced herself from the prize winner, which she deemed 'immoral'.

== See also ==
- List of submissions to the 70th Academy Awards for Best Foreign Language Film
- List of Hungarian submissions for the Academy Award for Best Foreign Language Film
