= My Boyfriend Is an Angel =

- Film poster
- Russian: Мой парень — ангел
- Directed by: Vera Storozheva
- Written by: Natalya Nazarova
- Produced by: Armen Adilkhanyan; Gevorg Nersisyan
- Starring: Artur Smolyaninov; Anna Starshenbaum; Sergey Puskepalis; Nikita Efremov; Irina Khakamada
- Cinematography: Oleg Kirichenko
- Music by: Gary Miller
- Release date: January 2, 2012
- Country: Russia
- Language: Russian

My Boyfriend Is an Angel (Russian: Мой парень — ангел) is a 2012 Russian romantic-comedy film directed by Vera Storozheva.

== Plot ==
The film takes place in Moscow around the time of New Year's Eve. Sasha is a student who is experiencing romantic trouble and worrying about her upcoming university exams. She is down-to earth, skeptical and does not believe in mystical beings such as angels. Through a chance encounter she meets Angel Seraphim who saves her life and tries to prove to her that angels truly exist. Seraphim's otherworldly and odd behavior confuses Sasha, who ends up developing feelings for him, despite her reservations.

== Cast ==
- Artur Smolyaninov as Seraphim
- Anna Starshenbaum as Sasha Nikolayeva
- Sergei Puskepalis as San Sanych
- Nikita Efremov
- Irina Khakamada as Film Director
- Gosha Kutsenko as Professor
- Andrey Leonov as Taxi Driver
- Ivan Makarevich as Kolya
- Ivan Okhlobystin as Driver of Official's Car
- Olga Popova
