= The Proof =

1988 novel by Ágota Kristóf

- Author: Agota Kristof
- Original title: La Preuve
- Language: French
- Series: The Notebook Trilogy
- Publisher: Éditions du Seuil
- Publication date: 1988

The Proof (French: La Preuve) is a novel by Agota Kristof published in 1988 by Éditions du Seuil. It constitutes the second volume of the "The Notebook Trilogy", the first volume being The Notebook and the trilogy ending with The Third Lie.

== Summary ==
The second part of the story opens with Lucas's period of unease due to his separation from his twin brother Claus, with whom he was one. Several characters subsequently intervene in the story, including the stationer Victor, who sells his house and bookstore to Lucas and is later sentenced to death for strangling his sister Sophie; the librarian Clara, Lucas's lover and obsessed with the death of her husband Thomas; Peter, Lucas's close friend; and finally Mathias, a child born from an incestuous relationship between a woman and his father, who is deformed but possesses a keen intelligence. At the end of the story, the child takes his own life, tormented by his deformity, which, in his opinion, prevents him from being loved by Lucas as a son. The story ends with the return of twin Claus to his hometown, where he is missing his twin.
