= The Third Lie =

1991 novel by Ágota Kristóf

- Author: Agota Kristof
- Original title: Le Troisième Mensonge
- Language: French
- Series: The Notebook Trilogy
- Publisher: Éditions du Seuil
- Publication date: 1991

The Third Lie (French: Le Troisième Mensonge) is a novel by Ágota Kristóf published on 30 August 1991 published by Éditions du Seuil and awarded the Prix du Livre Inter the following year. This is the third instalment of the "The Notebook Trilogy". The first instalment is the novel The Notebook, and the second is The Proof.

In his 1991 radio program Un livre, un jour, Olivier Barrot compared the story to "a tragedy like those of Antiquity" and analyzed this novel, with its "sparse, incredibly stark writing," as an "allegory of oppression." One of the two characters, Lucas, flees Hungary in 1956, just as Agota Kristof herself had done after the Hungarian Revolution.

== Summary ==
The novel has two narrators, one for each part: Lucas in the first, Klaus—his twin brother—in the second. The story takes place in an unnamed police state. The earliest event occurs at the beginning of the war—undoubtedly World War II, though this isn't explicitly stated. The twins are four years old at the time.

In the first part, Lucas's morbid dreams, haunted by a twin brother whose existence he doesn't know, or who he only dreamed to cope with loneliness, alternate with his accounts of his present and past life. The reader is left wondering whether he's lying or not, since Lucas explains from the outset that he records his lies in notebooks. "I try to tell my story, but [...] I can't, I don't have the courage, it hurts too much. So, I embellish everything and describe things not as they happened, but as I would have liked them to have happened".

His childhood was a tragedy: at four years old, at the beginning of the war, he was alone, without visitors at the hospital, unable to walk. Then he was in a rehabilitation center and after the war entrusted to an elderly woman he didn't know and who was poor.

His escape from his country at age 15 is the only passage in the novel written in the third person. The reader learns that upon arriving abroad, Lucas tells three lies: "The man with whom he crossed the border was not his father. The child was not eighteen years old, but fifteen. His name is not Claus".

The end of Lucas's story shows him searching for his twin brother. This brother is a famous poet whose pseudonym is Klaus Lucas. The first part ends with this paragraph: "At eight o'clock, I sit on the bed and dial my brother's phone number".

The second part begins with, "It's eight o'clock, the phone rings." Klaus recounts his encounter with his twin brother, Lucas, whom he hasn't seen since they were four years old. He denies being his brother but accepts his "last, unfinished manuscript." Klaus does what Lucas asked: "You will finish it. You have to finish it." The reader then learns what Lucas never knew: why he was alone in a hospital, unable to walk for so long, and why no one ever came to get him. Their mother, out of jealousy, killed their father, and a stray bullet wounded Klaus when he was only four. Klaus was raised by his father's mistress and only reconnected with his mother when he was eleven. But she always blamed him for not being Lucas, the son who disappeared because of her. No matter how much Klaus sacrifices for his mother, it's never enough. He can only wait hopelessly for his twin brother, Lucas, to return. “I go to bed and before falling asleep I talk to Lucas in my head, as I have done for many years. What I tell him is pretty much the same as usual. I tell him that, if he is dead, he is lucky and that I would like to be in his place. I tell him that he got the better part, that I am the one who has to bear the heaviest burden. I tell him that life is utterly pointless, it is nonsense, an aberration, infinite suffering, the invention of a Non-God whose wickedness defies comprehension”.

== Editions ==
Original printed edition

- Le Troisième Mensonge, éditions du Seuil, 1991 ISBN 2-02-013503-5

Audiobooks

- Agota Kristof (2003). Le Troisième Mensonge (in French). Paris: éd. Livraphone. ISBN 978-2-87809-294-3.
- Agota Kristof (2004). Le Troisième Mensonge (in French). Paris: éd. Livraphone.
