= Csikvánd =

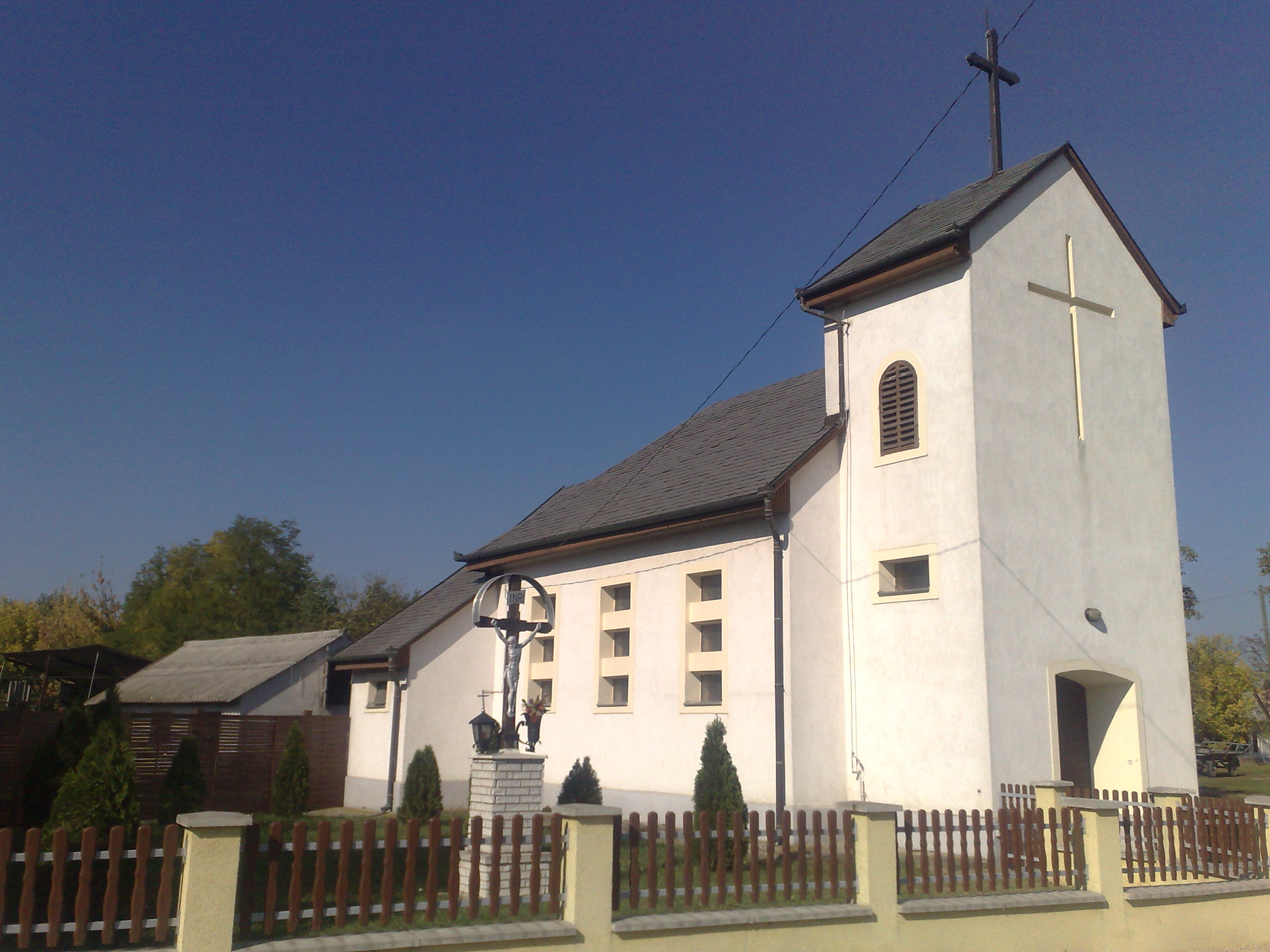
- Church of Saint Stephen

- Flag Coat of arms

- Location of Csikvánd
- Coordinates: 47.46745°N 17.45537°E
- Country: Hungary
- County: Győr-Moson-Sopron

Area
  - Total: 14.53 km^{2} (5.61 sq mi)

Population (2004)
  - Total: 497
  - Density: 34.2/km^{2} (89/sq mi)
- Time zone: UTC+1 (CET)
  - Summer (DST): UTC+2 (CEST)
- Postal code: 9127
- Area code: 96
- Website: https://csikvand.hu/

Csikvánd is a village in Győr-Moson-Sopron County, Hungary.

== Notable people ==
- Ágota Kristóf, Hungarian writer
