= 2007 in Russia =

- Decades: 1980s; 1990s; 2000s; 2010s; 2020s
- See also: History of Russia; Timeline of Russian history; List of years in Russia

Events from the year 2007 in Russia.

== Incumbents ==
- President - Vladimir Putin
- Prime Minister - Mikhail Fradkov to September 14, Viktor Zubkov

=== Governors ===
- Amur Oblast: Leonid Korotkov (ER, until May 10), Nikolay Kolesov (ER, starting June 1)
- Arkhangelsk Oblast: Nikolai Kiselev (ER)
- Astrakhan Oblast: Alexander Zhilkin (ER)
- Belgorod Oblast: Yevgeny Savchenko (ER)
- Bryansk Oblast: Nikolay Denin (ER)
- Chelyabinsk Oblast: Pyotr Sumin (ER)
- Irkutsk Oblast: Aleksandr Tishanin (ER)
- Ivanovo Oblast: Mikhail Men (ER)
- Kaliningrad Oblast: Georgy Boos (ER)
- Kaluga Oblast: Anatoly Artamonov (ER)
- Kemerovo Oblast: Aman Tuleyev (ER)
- Kirov Oblast: Vladimir Shaklein (ER)
- Kostroma Oblast: Viktor Shershunov (CPRF, until September 20), Igor Slyunyayev (ER, starting October 25)
- Kurgan Oblast: Oleg Bogomolov (ER)
- Kursk Oblast: Aleksandr Mikhailov (ER)
- Leningrad Oblast: Valery Serdyukov (ER)
- Lipetsk Oblast: Oleg Korolyov (ER)
- Magadan Oblast: Nikolai Dudov (ER)
- Moscow Oblast: Boris Gromov (ER)
- Murmansk Oblast: Yuri Yevdokimov (ER)
- Nizhny Novgorod Oblast: Valery Shantsev (ER)
- Novgorod Oblast: Mikhail Prusak (ER, until August 3), Sergey Mitin (ER, starting August 7)
- Novosibirsk Oblast: Viktor Tolokonsky (ER)
- Omsk Oblast: Leonid Polezhayev (ER)
- Orenburg Oblast: Alexey Chernyshev (ER)
- Oryol Oblast: Yegor Stroyev (ER)
- Penza Oblast: Vasily Bochkarev (ER)
- Pskov Oblast: Mikhail Kuznetsov (ER)
- Rostov Oblast: Vladimir Chub (ER)
- Ryazan Oblast: Georgy Shpak (ER)
- Sakhalin Oblast: Ivan Malakhov (ER, until August 7), Alexander Khoroshavin (ER, starting August 7)
- Samara Oblast: Konstantin Titov (ER, until August 27), Vladimir Artemyakov (ER, starting August 29)
- Saratov Oblast: Pavel Ipatov (ER)
- Smolensk Oblast: Viktor Maslov (ER, until December 19), Sergey Antufyev (ER, starting December 19)
- Tambov Oblast: Oleg Betin (ER)
- Tomsk Oblast: Viktor Kress (ER)
- Tula Oblast: Vyacheslav Dudka (ER)
- Tver Oblast: Dmitry Zelenin (ER)
- Tyumen Oblast: Vladimir Yakushev (ER)
- Ulyanovsk Oblast: Sergey Morozov (ER)
- Vladimir Oblast: Nikolay Vinogradov (CPRF)
- Volgograd Oblast: Nikolai Maksyuta (ER)
- Vologda Oblast: Vyacheslav Pozgalyov (ER)
- Voronezh Oblast: Vladimir Kulakov (ER)
- Yaroslavl Oblast: Anatoly Lisitsyn (ER, until December 25), Sergey Vakhrukov (ER, starting December 25)
- Jewish Autonomous Oblast: Nikolay Volkov (ER)

== Events ==
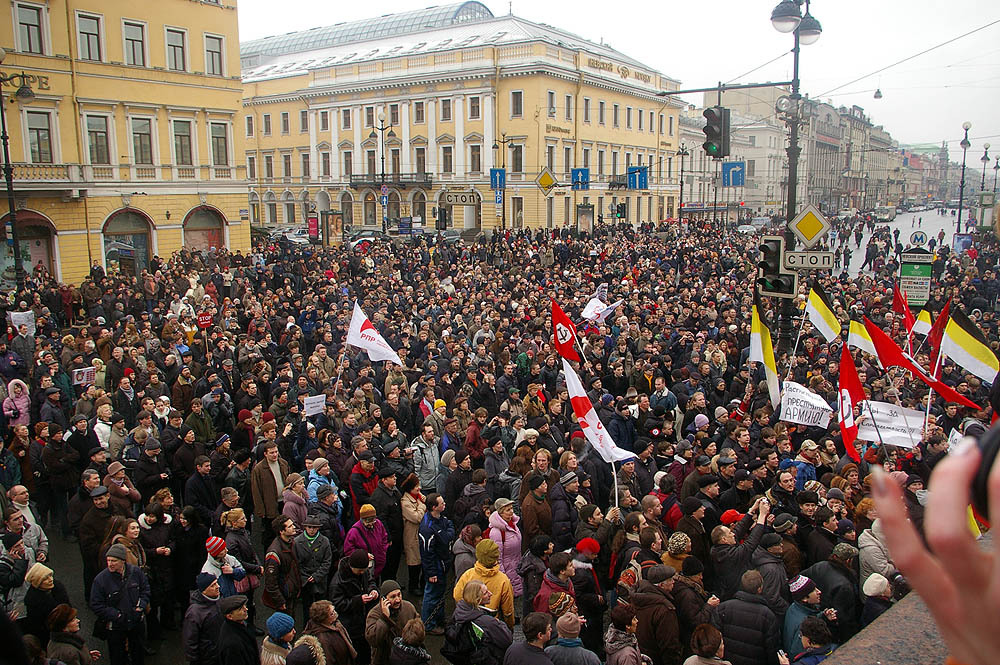
A Dissenters March rally in Saint Petersburg on March 3.

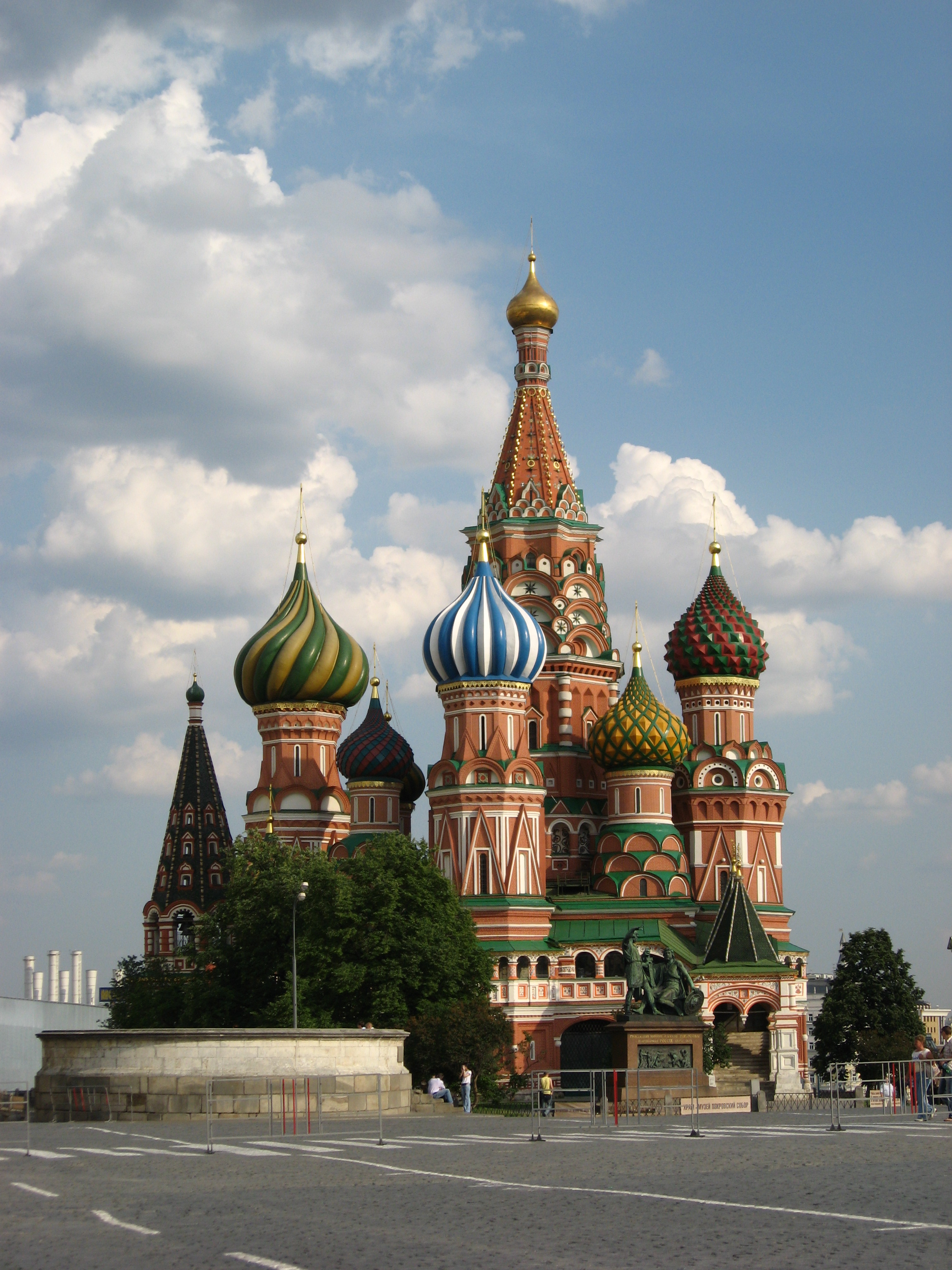
Saint Basil's Cathedral

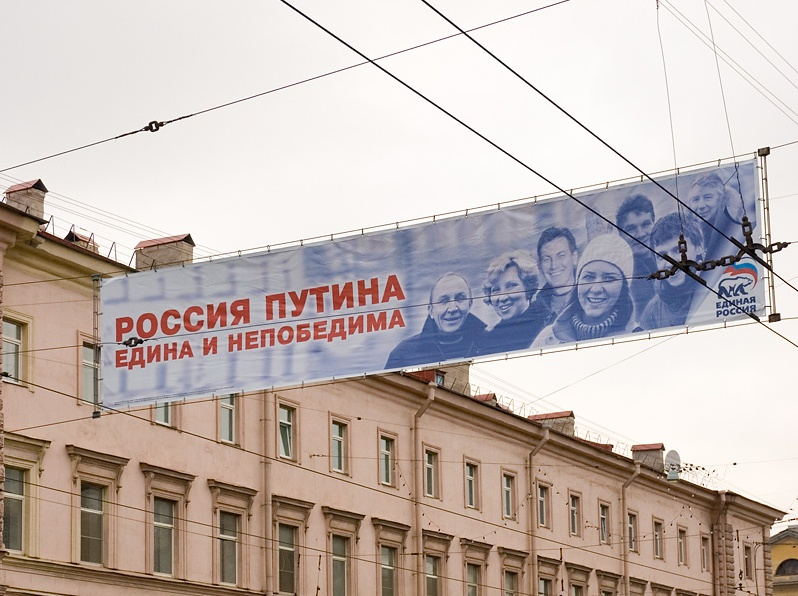
Advertisement for United Russia during the legislative election.

- January 1: The Evenk and Taymyr Autonomous Okrugs merged with Krasnoyarsk Krai, ending their status as federal subjects.
- January 8: The Russia-Belarus energy dispute escalates.
- February 2: Orange Snow fell in Siberia, most likely caused by sandstorms in neighboring Kazakhstan.
- March 17: UTair Flight 471 ends with a hard landing, killing at least 6 people and injuring 20 others.
- March 19: The Ulyanovskaya Mine disaster, a methane explosion Kemerovo Oblast, kills at least 108 people.
- April: It is reported in Forbes magazine, an American publication, that Russia now has 60 billionaires, mostly living in Moscow, which is believed to have more millionaires than any other city in the world. 15 years ago, Russia did not even have any millionaires.
- April 27: A Mil Mi-8 helicopter crashes in Chechnya, killing all 20 federal troops aboard.
- July 1: The Koryak Autonomous Okrug merged with Kamchatka Oblast, creating Kamchatka Krai.
- July 4: The International Olympic Committee awards the 2014 Winter Olympics to, Sochi, Russia.
- July 10 – August 4: The Arktika 2007 expedition commences, which is the first crewed descent to the ocean bottom at the North Pole.
- Summer: The Dissenters March, which began in December 2006, continue throughout the summer.
- September 7: Russian personnel are ambushed in the Vedeno region of Chechnya.
- November 15: The Guerilla phase of the Second Chechen War continues.
- November 24: Anti-Putin Protests, led by former world chess champion Garry Kasparov, erupted in Saint Petersburg and Moscow.
- December 2: A Chechen constitutional referendum was held in Chechnya.
- December 2: The Legislative elections for seats in the State Duma resulted in a majority win by United Russia.

== Popular culture ==
=== Sports ===
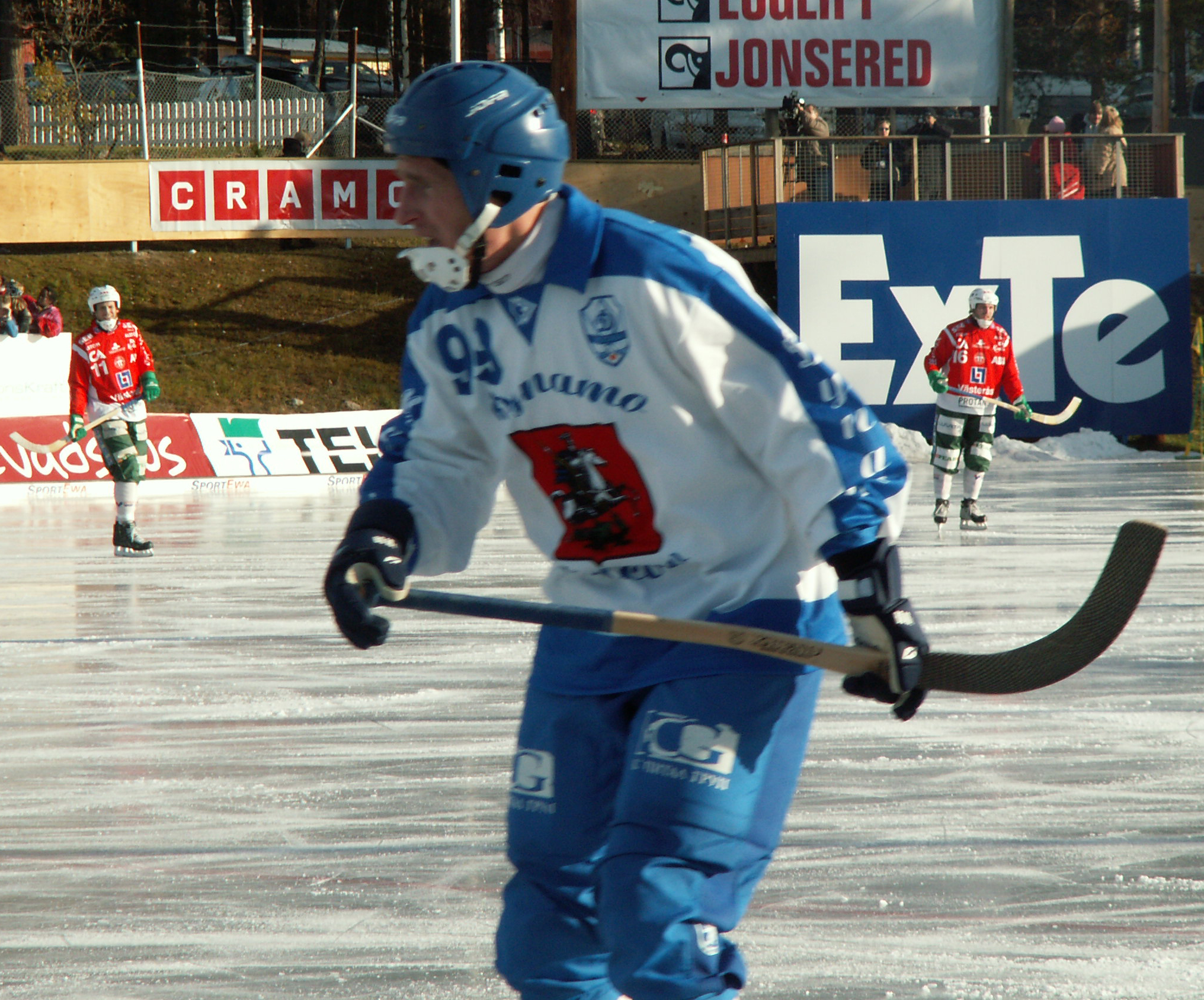
Sergey Obukhov, a player for the bandy team, Dynamo Moscow.

- January 27 – February 4: The Bandy World Championships, the sport competition for Bandy, began in Kemerovo.
- April 21 – September 23: The Russian Championship XVII, a tournament for semi-professional rugby league clubs, began.
- April 27 – May 13: The 71st IIHF World Championship sponsored by International Ice Hockey Federation was held in Moscow.
- August 19 – August 26: The Women's European Water Polo Olympic Qualifier for the 2008 Summer Olympics was held in Kirishi.
- September 28 – October 7: The World Fencing Championships were held in Saint Petersburg.
- November 21: The Russian football season ends, with the national football team winning 5 out of 10 games.
- November 22–25: The Cup of Russia, an international figure skating competition, began in Moscow.

=== Arts ===
- March 1 – 5: The 12th Open Russian Festival of Animated Film is held, with the Grand Prix award given to My Love.
- May 10 – 12: Russia's entry to the Eurovision Song Contest, held in Finland, "Song Number 1", comes in third.

== Notable births ==
- 29 April - Mirra Andreeva, tennis player
- 5 June - Adeliia Petrosian, figure skater

== Notable deaths ==
=== January ===
- January 9 – Yelena Petushkova, 66, Russian equestrian, double medallist at the 1972 Olympics, after long illness.
- January 19 – Murat Nasyrov, 37, Russian pop singer of Uyghur ethnicity, committed suicide.

=== April ===
- April 23 – Boris Yeltsin, 76, Russian politician, first President of the Russian Federation (1991–1999), heart failure.
- April 27 – Mstislav Rostropovich, cellist and conductor (born 1927)

=== November ===
- November 2 – Igor Moiseyev, 101, Russian choreographer, heart failure.
- November 3 – Aleksandr Dedyushko, 45, Russian actor, car crash.
- November 23 – Vladimir Kryuchkov, 83, Russian former KGB chief, led coup against Mikhail Gorbachev.

== See also ==
- List of Russian films of 2007
