= Géza Csáth =

Hungarian writer, playwright, musician, music critic and psychiatrist (1887–1919)

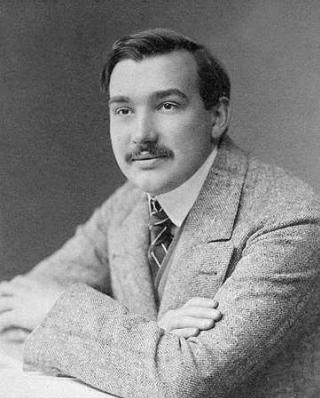
- Photograph of Csáth (c. 1915)
- Born: József Brenner; February 13, 1887; Szabadka, Austria-Hungary (today Subotica, Serbia)
- Died: September 11, 1919 (aged 32); Kelebija, Kingdom of Serbs, Croats and Slovenes (today Serbia)
- Occupations: Author; physician
- Spouse: Olga Jónás
- Relatives: Dezső Kosztolányi (cousin)

Géza Csáth (Hungarian: [ˈɡeːzɒ ˈt͡ʃaːt]; born József Brenner; February 13, 1887 – September 11, 1919) was a Hungarian writer, playwright, musician, music critic, psychiatrist, and physician. He was the cousin of Dezső Kosztolányi.

== Life ==
Géza Csáth (pen name of József Brenner) was a writer, critic, music theoretician and medical doctor. A competent violinist even as a child, he originally wanted to be a painter, but his teachers criticised his drawing, so he turned to writing. He was barely fourteen years old when his first writings on music criticism were published. After grammar school he moved from his native Szabadka (now Subotica in Serbia) to Budapest in order to study medicine. While at college he wrote short sketches and reviews for newspapers and magazines. He was among the first to laud the work of Bartók and Kodály.

After earning his degree as a medical doctor in 1909 he worked for a short time as a junior doctor at the Psychiatric and Nerve Clinic (also known as Moravcsik Psychiatric Hospital). He wrote his great novel Diary of a mentally ill woman based on his experiences as a psychiatric doctor (his other main work is his Diary). He became interested in the effects of narcotics from a medical point of view and also as a creative artist. Out of this curiosity, he started taking morphine in 1910 and soon became addicted.

Csáth also changed his job and worked at various spas as a doctor, and had ample time for writing. Most of his emblematic "dark" short stories were written during this period, often featuring utter physical or mental violence (such as fratricide, rape or seduction and abandonment of adolescent girls). Csáth often described these acts in first person, with powerful insight into the workings of the perpetrators' disturbed minds. His collected short stories were published under the title Tales which end unhappy (Mesék, amelyek rosszul végződnek).

He married Olga Jónás in 1913. In 1914 he was drafted into the army, and at the front his drug problem worsened so much that he was often sent to medical leave and was finally discharged in 1917. He tried to quit and become a village doctor. His condition further worsened, he became paranoid and by this time his addiction was the central problem of his life, significantly deteriorating his personal relations. In 1919 he was treated at a psychiatric clinic in a provincial hospital, but he fled and returned to his home. On July 22 he shot and killed his wife with a revolver, poisoned himself and slit his arteries. He was rushed to hospital at Szabadka, but later managed to escape again. He wanted to go to the Moravcsik Psychiatric Hospital, but upon being stopped by Yugoslavian border guards he killed himself by taking poison.

Inspired by Csáth's writings are the ballet "Comedia Tempio" of the dancer-choreographer Josef Nadj and the opera "A Varázsló Halála" ("The Magician's Death") by the composer Alessio Elia (first performance Nyitott Műhely Auditorium - Budapest, 14 June 2006). Janos Szaz's 2007 film "Opium: Diary of a Madwoman" features a doctor named Josef Brenner who is to some degree based on Csáth.

== Bibliography ==
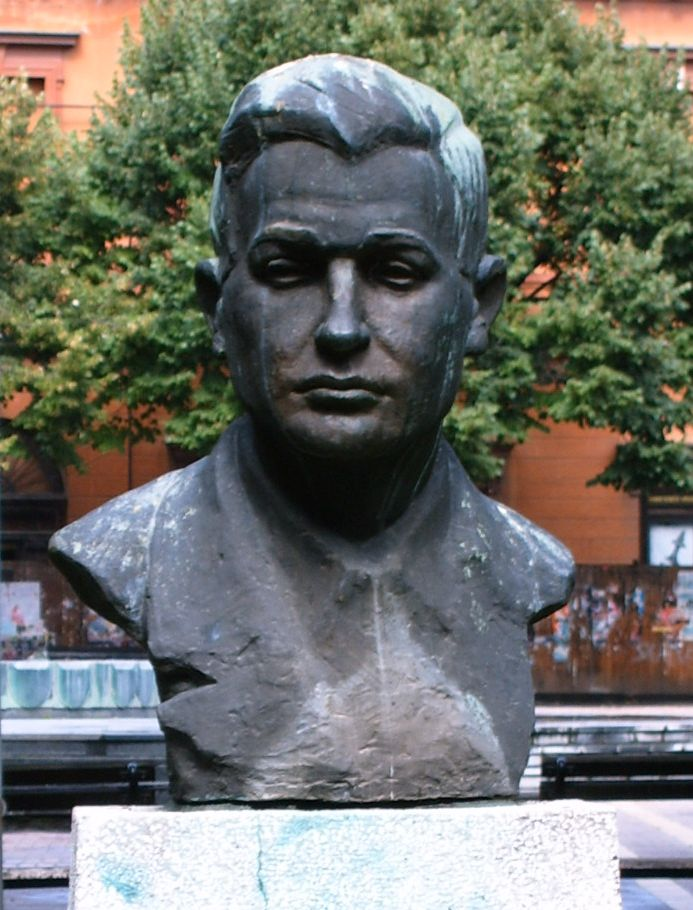
Bust of Géza Csáth in Szabadka

Works in English

- Diary of Géza Csáth. Translated by Peter Reich. Budapest: Angelusz & Gold, 2000.
- Magician's Garden and Other Stories by Géza Csáth. Compiled by Marianna D. Birnbaum, and translated by Jascha Kessler and Charlotte Rogers. New York: Columbia UP, 1980.
- Opium and other stories, edition of Magician's Garden and Other Stories by Géza Csáth., with introduction by Angela Carter. Harmondsworth: Penguin, 1983 (ISBN 0140066896).

Works in Italian

- Oppio e altre storie(with drawings by Attila Sassy). Translated and edited by M. D'Alessandro. Roma: E/O, 1985.

Works in Spanish

- Cuentos que acaban mal. Translated into Spanish by Dixon Servicios Lingüísticos, S.L. (Bernadette Borosi and Marga Valdeolmillos) and published in Spain by El Nadir, 2007

Works in German

- Csáth, Géza: Tagebuch 1912-1913 / Géza Csáth. Aus dem Ungarischen von Hans Skirecki und mit einem Nachwort versehen von Lászlo F. Földényi. Berlin: Brinkmann und Bose, 1990. (ISBN 3-922660-44-4)
- Csáth, Géza: Muttermord. Aus dem Ungarischen von Hans Skirecki. Berlin: Brinkmann und Bose, 1989 (ISBN 3-922660-42-8)
- Csáth, Géza: Erzählungen. Aus dem Ungarischen von Hans Skirecki. Berlin: Brinkmann und Bose, 1999 (ISBN 3-922660-74-6)

Works in Danish

- Csáth, Géza: Dagbog 1912-1913 Translator by Péter Eszterhás (ISBN 978-87-91407-76-5)

== Film adaptations ==
Based on Csáth's 1908 novella "Anyagyilkosság" ("matricide"), János Szász created 1997 the critically acclaimed Witman fiúk.
