= Dyuba-Dyuba =

1992 film

- Directed by: Aleksandr Khvan
- Written by: Pyotr Lutsik; Aleksei Samoryadov
- Starring: Oleg Menshikov
- Cinematography: Anatoli Susekov
- Edited by: Albina Antipenko
- Release date: 28 November 1992
- Running time: 140 minutes
- Country: Russia
- Language: Russian

Dyuba-Dyuba (Russian: Дюба-Дюба) is a 1992 Russian crime drama film directed by Aleksandr Khvan. It was entered into the 1993 Cannes Film Festival. The film won the award for Best Sound at the 1992 Nika Awards.

== Plot ==
The action takes place in the late 1980s in the Soviet Union after the collapse. The life of VGIK student Andrei Pletnyov (Oleg Menshikov) is going smoothly, but he commits a serious crime to get money for a jailbreak of his former lover. But their meeting after the successful escape does not bring happiness – during the years of separation they have become strangers to each other. Through the whole picture the underlying theme is a popular topic of those times – emigration to America (Andrei is planning to go there no matter what happens and offers Tatiana to do the same).

After yet another nervous breakdown, without shying away Tatiana comes to the house of her lover Kolya and gets into the hands of the police. Hopeless Andrei tries to find a way to get revenge on his opponent, he comes to him to iron out their relationship, but after getting seriously wounded with a knife, he sets off a grenade which explodes the whole apartment.

== Cast ==
- Oleg Menshikov as Andrei Pletnyov
- Anzhela Belyanskaya as Tanya Vorobyova
- Grigori Konstantinopolsky as Viktor
- Aleksandr Tyunin as Igor
- Aleksandr Negreba as Kolya
- Viktor Terelya as Oleg
- Vladimir Golovin as guard
- Georgi Taratorkin as lawyer
- Farhad Mahmudov as Dzhanik
