= The Notebook (1986 novel) =

1986 novel written by Ágota Kristóf

- Author: Agota Kristof
- Original title: Le Grand Cahier
- Language: French
- Series: The Notebook Trilogy
- Genre: Coming-of-age novel, military fiction
- Publication date: 1986

The Notebook (French: Le Grand Cahier) is a novel by Agota Kristof published in 1986. It constitutes the first volume of the "The Notebook Trilogy", which continues in The Proof and The Third Lie.

== Summary ==
In the Big City, war rages. To escape it, a woman leaves her twin sons with their grandmother in the countryside. The grandmother, a spiteful, filthy, and miserly old woman, barely takes them in. Left to fend for themselves, the two children learn to overcome the cold, hunger, and daily cruelties in a devastated land.

In their "Big Notebook," the twins strive to write down their discoveries and learnings with the greatest possible objectivity: for example, they write that "it is forbidden to write: 'The Little Town is beautiful', because the Little Town can be beautiful to us and ugly to someone else".

Together, the boys reject conventional morality and construct their own set of values.

== The Notebook and the "Abbeville affair" ==
The Notebook is also known for the controversy it generated, following what the press called the "Abbeville affair". On 23 November 2000, Police interrupted a class of 14 and 15 year olds in Abbeville, France and took their teacher to the police station, following a complaint from some parents who said the teacher was recommending pornographic reading material to their children, referring to The Notebook.

The work was, however, on the curriculum of many high schools and considered a classic of contemporary literature. The matter was quickly closed due to the support shown to the teacher by numerous intellectuals and professors. The Minister of National Education, Jack Lang, also sent a letter of support to the principal of the school.

The novel is therefore often used as an example of the censorship of "teen literature" in France.

== Influences ==
The video game Mother 3 was influenced by the major themes of The Notebook . The game's main characters, Lucas and Claus, are named after the narrators of the book. The game's designer, Shigesato Itoi, himself a writer, compared the novel in glowing terms to an RPG.

== Adaptations ==
=== Cinema ===
The novel was adapted by Hungarian director János Szász in his film of the same name released in 2013 (Hungarian title: A nagy füzet).

The film was selected to represent Hungary at the 86th Academy Awards in the Best Foreign Language Film category and was one of nine films likely to be nominated.

=== Théâtre ===
The play was adapted and directed by Catherine Vidal, and was performed in Montréal at the Théâtre Prospero in 2009, at the Théâtre de Quat'Sous in 2010, and then in Ottawa at the National Arts Centre in 2012. Olivier Morin and Renaud Lacelle-Bourdon played the role of the twins.

== Livre audio ==
- Agota Kristof (2003). Le Grand Cahier (in French). Paris: éd. Livraphone. ISBN 978-2-87809-288-2.
- Agota Kristof (2004). Le Grand Cahier (in French). Paris: éd. Livraphone.

== Annexes ==
=== Bibliography ===
- Kristof, Agota (1986) Le Grand Cahier, Paris : Seuil, collection Points, 1995
- Rolland, Annie, « Le visage étrangement inquiétant de la censure » in: Qui a peur de la littérature ado ?, Paris : éditions Thierry Magnier, collection Essais, 2008

=== External links ===
- List of Hungarian Academy Award winners and nominees
