= The French Guy =

- Russian: Француз
- Written by: Ilya Avramenko
- Directed by: Vera Storozheva
- Starring: Thierry Monfray; Maria Golubkina; Mikhail Efremov
- Music by: Andrey Antonenko
- Country of origin: Russia
- Original language: Russian

Production
- Producers: Sabina Eremeeva; Ekaterina Filippova
- Cinematography: Grigori Yablochnikov
- Editor: Sergey Tkachev
- Running time: 104 min.
- Production company: TVS

Original release
- Network: Channel One
- Release: 7 January 2004

The French Guy (Russian: Француз, romanized: Frantsuz) is a 2004 Russian romantic comedy television film directed by Vera Storozheva. The film was made for TVS, which was shut down by the Russian government in June 2003. Consequently, the film was purchased by Channel One, where it premiered on 7 January 2004.

== Plot ==
French baron Paul de Rousseau (Thierry Monfray) corresponds with Irina, a young woman from Russia (Ekaterina Vulichenko), whom his valet, Guillaume (Bernard Passavi), found through a marriage agency. During a chance encounter with translator Anya (Maria Golubkina), Paul discovers that the letters he received from "Irina" were actually written by Anya herself. Anya, a graduate of Moscow State University, returned to her hometown, Glukhaya Potma, after finishing her studies. Paul falls deeply in love with Anya and sets out to win her heart. His adventures in Russia transform him: once a wealthy nobleman, he’s quickly reduced to homelessness by train thieves. Along the way, he learns to drink vodka on a dare, receives a gift of a Christmas tree (which an elderly woman later takes back), and ultimately finds the love of his life. After winning Anya's affection and outcompeting her fiancé (Garik Sukachev), Paul takes her and his newfound Russian friends back to Paris.

== Cast ==
- Thierry Monfray as Paul
- Maria Golubkina as Anya
- Mikhail Efremov as Karpienko
- Stanislav Duzhnikov as Tolik
- Dmitry Orlov as policeman
- Sergei Popov as Anya's father
- Irina Rakhmanova as рassenger
- Pavel Derevyanko as рassenger
- Nina Ruslanova as Anya's mother
- Garik Sukachov as Leonid
- Zoya Tolbuzina as Manya
- Inga Strelkova-Oboldina as Tamara
