= Carmen (2003 Russian film) =

- Russian: Кармен
- Directed by: Aleksandr Khvan
- Written by: Yuriy Korotkov; Prosper Mérimée
- Produced by: Sergey Chliyants
- Starring: Igor Petrenko; Olga Filippova; Yaroslav Boyko; Aleksandr Sheyn Jr.; Ramil Sabitov
- Cinematography: Igor Kozhevnikov
- Edited by: Albina Antipenko
- Music by: Gennady Gladkov
- Release date: June 25, 2003
- Running time: 113 minutes
- Country: Russia
- Language: Russian

Carmen (Russian: Кармен) is a 2003 Russian romantic drama film directed by Aleksandr Khvan. The film tells about the relationship of an honest police officer and a prisoner in a tobacco factory.

== Plot ==
Sergey Nikitin, a diligent police sergeant, is newly assigned to guard a tobacco factory in a women's prison. There, he encounters Carmen, a fiery inmate with a wild reputation. Against the rules, she tosses him a flower, sparking his interest in her. Despite initial resistance, Carmen captivates Sergey, gradually drawing him into her life and eventually into her plan to escape. After a failed pursuit, Carmen evades capture, but the incident damages Sergey’s reputation, demoting him to street patrol. Later, they meet again outside prison, where Carmen lures him further into her world. Their connection deepens as Sergey becomes entwined in Carmen's criminal lifestyle, following her to a life of deceit, theft, and even murder. Together, they evade capture, hiding in the mountains and engaging in increasingly daring heists, with Sergey’s loyalty to Carmen leading him to commit acts he once would have condemned.

As their criminal ventures escalate, so do the tensions between them. Carmen begins a relationship with a rival gang member, Krivoy, and Sergey, consumed by jealousy, kills him. Carmen, however, grows weary of their life on the run. When Sergey suggests they escape together, she coldly reveals that she no longer loves him. Desperate and betrayed, Sergey kills her. Throughout the film, he recounts his story in gripping detail to his lawyer, whom he calls "Doctor," as he awaits trial, weaving a tale of passion, betrayal, and the ruinous lengths to which obsession can drive a man.

== Cast ==
- Igor Petrenko as Sergey
- Olga Filippova as Carmen
- Yaroslav Boyko as "Squint"
- Aleksandr Sheyn Jr. as Schegol (as Aleksandr Sheyn)
- Ramil Sabitov as Vener
- Aleksey Gorbunov as Defence Lawyer
- Vasiliy Sedykh
- Tamara Sovchi as Dorothea
- Aleksandr Mezentsev as Doctor
