= Granny (2003 film) =

- Russian: Бабуся
- Directed by: Lidia Bobrova
- Written by: Lidia Bobrova
- Produced by: Jean Bréhat; Andrei Zertsalov
- Starring: Nina Shubina; Olga Onishchenko; Anna Ovsyannikova; Vladimir Kulakov; Sergey Anufriev
- Cinematography: Valery Revich
- Edited by: Tatyana Bystrova
- Release date: 2003
- Countries: Russia; France
- Language: Russian

Granny (Russian: Бабуся) is a 2003 Russian drama film directed by Lidia Bobrova.

== Plot ==
The plot focuses on a grandmother whose grandchildren grew up and started a family. She sells her house, and gives the money to her grandchildren, having left to live with her daughter and son-in-law in the city apartment that they received. It would seem that she lives a calm life, but suddenly a disaster occurred.

== Cast ==
- Nina Shubina as Granny
- Olga Onishchenko as Liza
- Anna Ovsyannikova as Anna
- Vladimir Kulakov as Viktor
- Sergey Anufriev as Nikolay
- Yuriy Ovsyanko as Ivan
- Valentina Cherkozyanova as Valentina
- Mariya Lobachova as Taya
- Sergey Gamov as Tolik
- Tamara Tsyganova as Masha
