= It Is Easy to Die =

- Russian: Умирать легко
- Directed by: Aleksandr Khvan
- Written by: Ivan Biryukov; Grigory Ryazhsky; Lyudmila Ulitskaya
- Produced by: Sergey Kozlo; Grigory Ryazhsky; Igor Tolstunov
- Starring: Polina Kutepova; Aleksandr Lazarev; Georgiy Taratorkin; Svetlana Bragarnik; Aleksandr Tyunin
- Cinematography: Anatoly Susekov
- Edited by: Albina Antipenko
- Music by: Andrey Eshpay
- Release date: 1999
- Country: Russia
- Language: Russian

It Is Easy to Die (Russian: Умирать легко) is a 1999 Russian action film directed by Aleksandr Khvan.

== Plot ==
The film tells about a man expecting the death of a loved one.

== Cast ==
- Polina Kutepova as Liza
- Aleksandr Lazarev as Ilya
- Georgiy Taratorkin as Feliks
- Svetlana Bragarnik as Yelena
- Aleksandr Tyunin as Igor
- Valentina Titova as Children's Home Director
- Elena Shevchenko as Natasha
