= David Neiman =

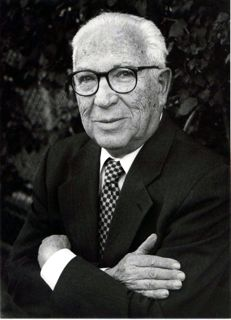
David Neiman

David Neiman (1921 – February 22, 2004) was a renowned scholar in the fields of Biblical Studies, Jewish history, and the long and often complicated relationship between the Catholic Church and the Jews.

== Early life and education ==
Born in Russia in 1921, he escaped from the Soviet Union to the United States with his family in 1923. Raised in Brooklyn, New York in a traditional, observant Jewish family, Neiman studied in a Yeshiva elementary school, attended public high school and enrolled in City College of New York in 1938

In 1942, he returned to Yeshivah to study Talmud and Rabbinic literature and received Rabbinical ordination in 1945. Following his ordination, he entered the Oriental institute of the University of Chicago, at the time the world's leading institution of Near Eastern studies. In 1950 he received his MA after writing a research thesis on the Letters of Lachish—a set of ancient Hebrew inscriptions, which were discovered in Palestine in 1936.

He continued his studies at Dropsie College for Hebrew and Cognate Learning in Philadelphia. He received his PhD in 1955 having completed a work on domestic relations in antiquity.

== Professional career ==
Neiman started to teach at the New School for Social Research in New York in 1955. His continued involvement in the Jewish community led him to found the Academy for Higher Jewish Learning in New York in 1956, which is now known as the Academy for Jewish Religion.

In 1963, Neiman was invited and accepted the professorship of Biblical Studies at Brandeis University in Waltham, Massachusetts. While at Brandeis, he organized a special meeting of the Society of Biblical Literature. Impressed, a group of Catholic priests approached him and asked him if he would be interested in a position at a Catholic Seminary. Shortly thereafter, he was appointed professor of Jewish Theology at Boston College. His appointment was the first for a Jewish professor of theology at any Catholic university. While at Boston College, he organized the Institute of Biblical Archeology and conducted ten archaeological expeditions to Israel.

In 1971, he was invited to teach a course at the Pontifical Gregorian University in Rome, Italy, one of the Pope's universities and the world's leading Jesuit institute. He taught a course on the Jewish Background to the New Testament to a class of post-graduate priests and nuns.

In 1973–74, he took his family to Israel for his sabbatical year. During this period Neiman entered the world of the ultra-orthodox Jews of Jerusalem where he studied Talmud, and began to learn the art of Hebrew calligraphy, a talent he continued to practice for years. He also taught at the World Union of Jewish Students, and at the Tantur Ecumenical Institute in Jerusalem.

Over the years, Neiman led congregations in Ohio, Pennsylvania, New York and Massachusetts. He was sought after to speak on a variety of topics related to Jewish History and Biblical Studies. He led tours of Spain, focusing on the history of the Jews in Spain, and led many biblical archaeological tours of Israel.

After retirement from Boston College, he moved to Los Angeles, California where he taught courses at Loyola Marymount University and St. John's Seminary for Catholic Priests in Camarillo.

From 1999, until shortly before his death on February 22, 2004, he taught courses relating to Jewish History at the University of Judaism (now the American Jewish University) in Los Angeles. He also led several private bible study groups and lectures at various institutions around the greater Los Angeles area.

Neiman's library was donated to the Valley Beth Shalom Synagogue in Encino, California and St. John's Seminary in Camarillo, California.

== Written works ==
Neiman was the author of The Book of Job, Domestic Relations in Antiquity, and the unpublished Mink Shmink – The Influence of Yiddish on the American Language, part of a comprehensive study of the history of the Jewish languages. He also wrote an article for the Encyclopedia Judaica, as well as contributing to many university journal publications.
