= The Golden Snake =

- Directed by: Vladimir Makeranets
- Written by: Gennady Bokarev
- Produced by: Gennady Bokarev, Vladimir Makeranets, Natalya Nikonova
- Starring: Ivan Bobylyov, Oleg Yagodin
- Cinematography: Nikolay Banko
- Music by: Sergei Starostin, Andrey Doynikov
- Production companies: Sverdlovsk Film Studio, Studio Ur-Al
- Release date: 2007
- Running time: 85 minutes
- Country: Russia
- Language: Russian

The Golden Snake (Russian: Золотой полоз, romanized: Zolotoy poloz) is a 2007 Russian fantasy drama film directed by Vladimir Makeranets. It is a loose adaptation of Pavel Bazhov's story "The Great Snake" based on the Ural region Russian folklore. It was financed of the Ministry of Culture of Sverdlovsk Oblast and the Federal Agency for Culture and Cinematography. The Golden Snake was awarded the "Best Children's Film" prize at the Russian film festival Literatura i Kino in 2008.

In the film, two boys meet the legendary creature the Great Snake (also translated as Poloz the Great Snake) from the Ural folklore that has control over gold.

== Cast ==
- Ivan Bobylyov as Semyonitch / Poloz the Great Snake
- Oleg Yagodin as Koska (adult)
- Yaroslav Andreev as Koska (child)
- Pavel Oznobishin as Deniska (adult)
- Vanya Sukhoverkhy as Deniska (child)
- Yelena Golunenko as Dunyasha
- Valery Smirnov as Zhabrey
- Vladimir Ivansky as Levonty
- Anton Kazakov as Pantyukha
- Dmitry Zakharov as Nikolka (adult)
- Alexander Mikhailov as Nikolka (young)
- Vyacheslav Kokorin as Yefimitch
- Vyacheslav Chuisov as Matvey
- Valery Seregin as Osip
