= You Exist... =

- Russian: Ты есть…
- Directed by: Vladimir Makeranets
- Written by: Viktoriya Tokareva
- Produced by: Natalya Nikonova
- Starring: Anna Kamenkova; Vadim Lyubshin; Inga Ilm; Regimantas Adomaitis; Tatyana Lyutaeva
- Cinematography: Nikolai Banko
- Edited by: Galina Porokhnya
- Music by: Aleksandr Pantykin
- Production company: Sverdlovsk Film Studio
- Release date: 1993
- Running time: 100 min.
- Countries: Russia; France
- Language: Russian

You Exist... (Russian: Ты есть…, romanized: Ty est..., French: Tu es...) is a 1993 Russian-French drama film directed by Vladimir Makeranets.

== Plot ==
The film tells about a woman Anna, whose husband died, and her son Oleg became the meaning of her life. Suddenly he brings home the beautiful girl Ira and says that they were married, which makes Anna jealous and fear of losing him. Lovers leave home, leaving Anna alone.

== Cast ==
- Anna Kamenkova as Anna
- Vadim Lyubshin as Oleg
- Inga Ilm as Ira
- Regimantas Adomaitis as Vershinin
- Tatyana Lyutaeva as Yulia
- Natalya Kovalyova as Anna's friend
- Natalya Potapova as Anna's friend
- Ivan I. Krasko as traditional healer

== Criical response ==
Film critic Alexander Fedorov noted: "The film uses the usual melodrama techniques: a poor daughter-in-law and a wealthy mother-in-law, an unexpected car accident, a femme fatale who forces the hero to cheat on his crippled wife, and so on. The film's creators have added details and psychological insights to make it more engaging. The acting is charming, and the direction is acceptable, although it lacks subtlety and elegance".
