= 2004 Arkhangelsk apartment explosion =

Gas explosion in Russia caused by sabotage

Coordinates: 64.537°N 40.566°E

2004 Arkhangelsk explosion
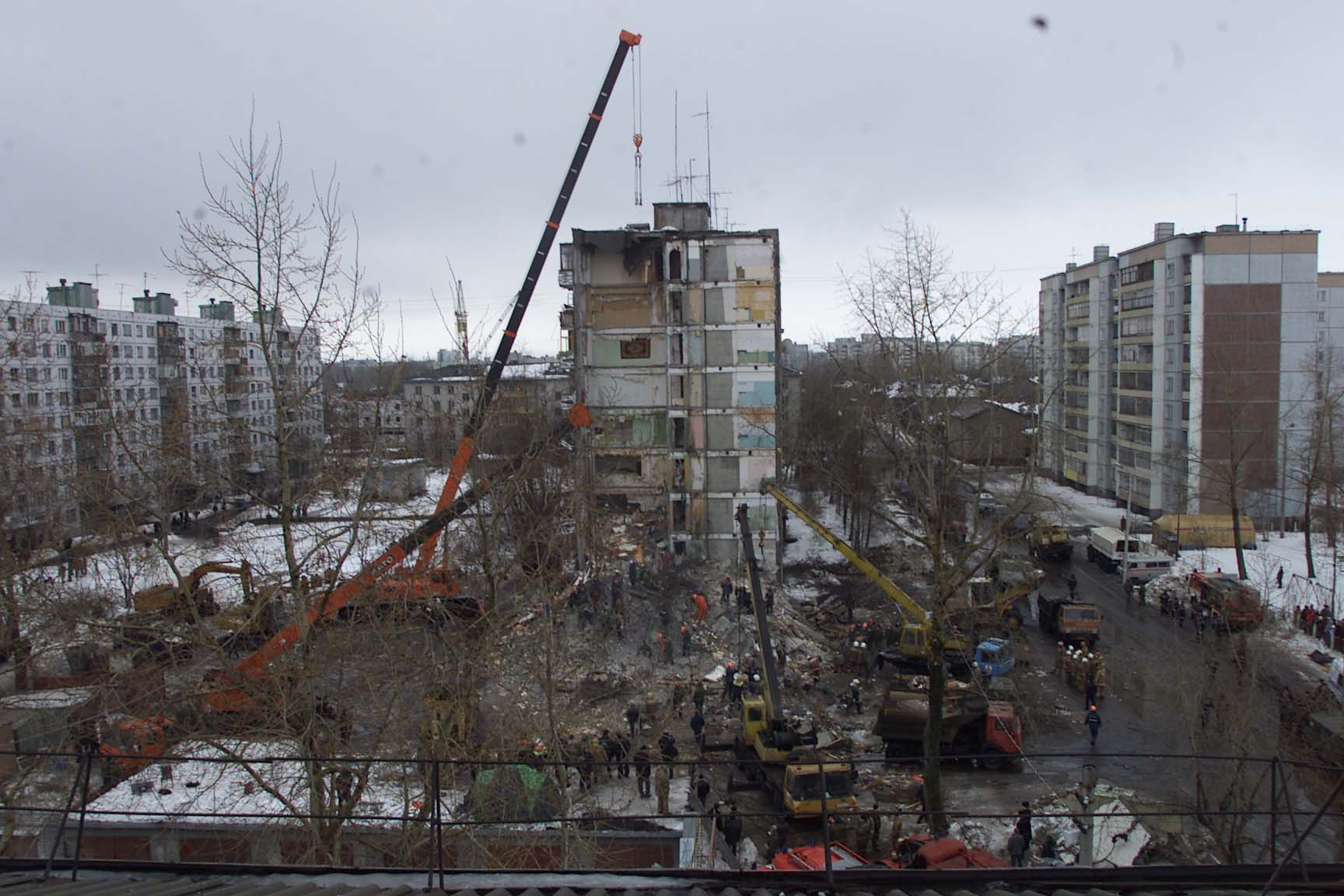
- House
- Date: 16 March 2004
- Time: 3:03 AM
- Location: Arkhangelsk, Arkhangelsk Oblast, Northwestern Federal District, Russia
- Cause: Sabotage
- Deaths: 58
- Injuries: 175
- Convicted: Sergey Alekseychik

On March 16, 2004, an explosion destroyed a corner section of a nine-storey Soviet-era apartment building in Arkhangelsk, Russia. It happened at 3:03 a.m. local time (UTC +3). The explosion occurred in 120 Avenue of the Soviet Cosmonauts in the October district (Oktyabrskiy rayon) of Arkhangelsk.

The death toll from the explosion was 58 (33 women, 16 men and 9 children). Two of the dead succumbed to their wounds in a hospital after being rescued.

The explosion came two days after Vladimir Putin won reelection and several weeks after a suicide bombing killed 41 Moscow Metro passengers.

In April 2004, authorities arrested and charged 26-year-old former employee of city gas services Sergey Alekseychik. On December 16, 2005, he was sentenced to 25 years in prison. According to the official version, Alekseychik was fired from his natural gas technician job several days prior to the explosion, and to get even with his former employers and the city, he sabotaged the gas system, thus causing the tragedy.

== See also ==
- Arkhangelsk FSB office bombing
