= 29th Moscow International Film Festival =

Film festival

- Location: Moscow, Russia
- Founded: 1959
- Awards: Grand Prix
- Festival date: 21–30 June 2007
- Website: Website

The 29th Moscow International Film Festival was held from 21 to 30 June 2007. The Golden George was awarded to the Russian film Travelling with Pets directed by Vera Storozheva.

== Jury ==
- Fred Schepisi (Australia – Chairman of the Jury)
- Anna Galiena (Italy)
- Dito Tsintsadze (Georgia)
- Ildikó Enyedi (Hungary)
- Othman Karim (Sweden)
- Renata Litvinova (Russia)
- Fred Roos (United States)

== Films in competition ==
The following films were selected for the main competition:

English title	Original title	Director(s)	Production country
Viva	Viva	Anna Biller	United States
Temporary Release	Ledsaget udgang	Erik Clausen	Denmark
The Children of USSR	Yaldey CCCP	Felix Gerchikov	Israel
The International	Beynelmilel	Sırrı Süreyya Önder, Muharrem Gulmez	Turkey
Broken English	Broken English	Zoe Cassavetes	United States
My Führer – The Really Truest Truth about Adolf Hitler	Mein Führer - Die wirklich wahrste Wahrheit über Adolf Hitler	Dani Levy	Germany
Molière	Molière	Laurent Tirard	France
A Man's Job	Miehen tyo	Aleksi Salmenperä	Finland
Hope	Nadzieja	Stanisław Mucha	Germany, Poland
The Unknown Woman	La Sconociuta	Giuseppe Tornatore	Italy
Nothing Personal	Nichego lichnogo	Larisa Sadilova	Russia
Opium: Diary of a Madwoman	Ópium: Egy elmebeteg nö naplója	János Szász	Hungary, Germany, United States
The Park	Gongyuan	Yin Lichuan	China
Travelling with Pets	Puteshestviye s domashnimi zhivotnymi	Vera Storozheva	Russia
Putina	Putina	Valery Ogorodnikov	Russia
The Russian Triangle	Rusuli samkudhedi	Aleko Tsabadze	Georgia
At the River	U reki	Eva Neymann	Ukraine
The Inugamis	Inugami-ke no ichizoku	Kon Ichikawa	Japan
Eduart	Eduart	Angeliki Antoniou	Greece, Germany

== Awards ==
- Golden George: Travelling with Pets by Vera Storozheva
- Special Jury Prize: Silver George: The Russian Triangle by Aleko Tsabadze
- Silver George:
  - Best Director: Giuseppe Tornatore for The Unknown Woman
  - Best Actor: Fabrice Luchini for Molière
  - Best Actress: Kirsti Stubø for Opium: Diary of a Madwoman
- Silver George for the best film of the Perspective competition: Monotony by Juris Poskus
- Lifetime Achievement Award: Aleksey Batalov, Tatiana Samoilova
- Stanislavsky Award: Daniel Olbrychski
