= Russian ship Alexander Nevsky =

At least three ships of the Imperial Russian Navy, Soviet Navy, or Russian Navy have been named Alexander Nevsky after the Russian saint Alexander Nevsky.

- Russian frigate Alexander Nevsky, a screw frigate launched in 1861
- Soviet cruiser Aleksandr Nevsky, a Sverdlov-class cruiser launched in 1951
- Russian submarine Alexander Nevsky (K-550), a Borei-class submarine launched in 2010

== See also ==
- Russian icebreaker St. Alexander Nevsky, launched in 1916. Saw service with the Royal Navy as HMS Alexander before returning to Russia and entering into service with the Soviet Union as Lenin.
