= Travelling with Pets =

- Directed by: Vera Storozheva
- Screenplay by: Arkady Krasil'shchikov
- Produced by: Sabina Eremeeva, Igor Tolstunov
- Starring: Xenia Kutepova; Dmitri Dyuzhev; Yevgeny Knyazev
- Cinematography: Oleg Lukichev
- Music by: Ilya Shipilov
- Release date: 15 June 2007
- Running time: 97 minutes
- Country: Russia
- Language: Russian

Travelling with Pets (Russian: Путешествие с домашними животными, romanized: Puteshestviye s domashnimi zhivotnymi) is a 2007 Russian romantic drama film directed by Vera Storozheva. It won the Golden George at the 29th Moscow International Film Festival.

== Cast ==
- Kseniya Kutepova as Natalia
- Dmitriy Dyuzhev as Sergei
- Yevgeny Knyazev as Priest
- Anna Mikhalkova as Klavdiya
- Vadim Afanassiev as Natalia's husband
- Sofiya Dudarchik as Olga
- Olga Popova as Paramedic
- Timofey Tribuntsev as Ment
- Aleksandr Oblasov as Security guard
