= In That Land... =

1997 Russian drama film

- Russian: В той стране
- Directed by: Lidia Bobrova
- Written by: Lidiya Bobrova
- Produced by: Aleksandr Golutva
- Starring: Dmitri Klopov; Vladimir Borchaninov; Anna Ovsyannikova; Aleksandr Stakheyev; Andrei Dunayev
- Cinematography: Sergey Astakhov; Valery Revich
- Edited by: Tatyana Bystrova; Raisa Lisova
- Release date: 1998
- Country: Russia
- Language: Russian

In That Land... (Russian: В той стране) is a 1998 Russian drama film directed by Lidia Bobrova.

== Plot ==
The film takes place in a Russian village, in whose life there is everything: birth and death, the struggle of love and hatred, good and evil, honor and betrayal...

== Cast ==
- Dmitri Klopov
- Vladimir Borchaninov
- Anna Ovsyannikova
- Aleksandr Stakheyev
- Andrei Dunayev
- Tatyana Zakharova
- Zoya Buryak
- Svetlana Gaytan
