= Engineering Red =

Russian surrealist film

- Directed by: Andrey Yi, Armen Petrosyan
- Written by: Andrey Yi
- Based on: The Magic Mountain by Thomas Mann
- Produced by: Roman Krishtul
- Starring: Anna Syomkina
- Production company: Sfera
- Release date: 1993
- Running time: 75 minutes
- Country: Russia
- Language: Russian

Engineering Red (Russian: Конструктор красного цвета, romanized: Konstruktor krasnogo tsveta) is a 1993 Russian surrealist part-documentary/part-narrative film by Andrey Yi and animator Armen Petrosyan.

The script is based on Thomas Mann's novel The Magic Mountain (1924) and the idea of creating artificial people in the Soviet Union (in the 1940-1950s).

== Plot ==
The film is divided into three chapters and has two storylines—documentary and fiction.

The fictional part of the film consists of psychedelic scenes: a red room, a girl in red silk, kaleidoscopic images. A female voice-over reads an excerpt from The Magic Mountain, in which the thoughts of a deceased soldier are heard (his consciousness is still in a dead body), sounding his reflections on Christ, the Apostles, and the Bible. The soldier's body then falls prey to necrophiliac children.

The documentary part talks about medicine, like pig heart transplant, cadaveric blood transfusion, a story of conjoined twins, etc.

== History of creation ==
"The idea for the film was crazy, but that was exactly what had to be done in those years. And I achieved my goal: two or three people really vomited while watching. This effect was worth it: the film was shown at the Moscow festival along with the films of world-class masters."

— Andrey Yi. Film director,
