= Alexander Nevsky (prize) =

Russian national annual historical-literary competition

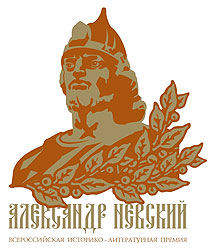

The Alexander Nevsky prize (Russian: Всероссийская историко-литературная премия "Александр Невский ") is a Russian national annual historical-literary competition, established in 2004, named after saint prince of Russia Alexander Nevsky. The prize includes two awards: one for literature and historical writing and one for museum memorial projects.

== Founders ==
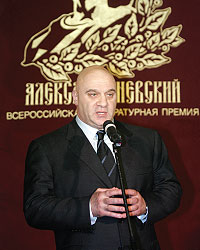
Alexander Ebralidze

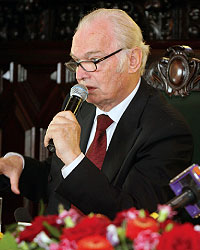
Valeriy Ganichev

The Russian National historical-literary prize "Alexander Nevsky" was established by JSC "Taleon" (General director – Alexander Ebralidze) and Russian Union of Writers (Chairman – Valery Ganichev) in 2004.

== About the prize ==
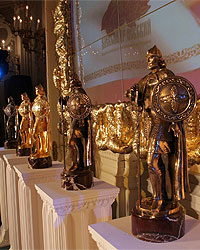
Alexander Nevsky prize

The main aim of the founders is to revive the interest in Russian history among Russian and international community, and popularization of historical literature and memorial museums. This initiative is widely supported by outstanding public figures, famous historical scientists, heads of major publishing houses and directors of the leading Russian museums. Thus, the commission of awarding of the prize "Alexander Nevskiy" and advisory board include such outstanding cultural and literature officials as Nikolay Skatov – corresponding member and advisor of Russian Academy of Sciences, Vladimir Tolstoy – director of The memorial estate of Leo Tolstoy "Yasnaya Polyana" and president of the Russian committee of International Council of Museums, Alexander Sokolov – director of the Russian State Historical Archive, Konstantin Chechenev – president of the Russian Book Publishers Alliance, Georgy Velinbakhov – head of the Russian Heraldic Presidential Council and deputy director of The State Hermitage Museum.

During last 7 years dozens of talented writers, historical scientists, members of major museums and enthusiasts from school and national museums have been honored with the prize. Among them outstanding writers, literati, historians, cultural workers, statesmen, public and cultural figures became the laureates of Russian National historical-literary prize “Alexander Nevsky”: Anastasia Shirinskaya – legendary woman, who managed to save heritage of the last moorage of the Imperial Black sea Fleet in Bizerte (Tunisia), Vladimir Karpov, Pyotr Stegniy – Russian Ambassador Extraordinary and Minister Plenipotentiary in Israel, Boris Tarasov – rector of Maxim Gorky Literature Institute, Aza Takho-Godi – professor, doctor of philological Science, widow of famous Russian philosopher Alexey Losev, Ilya Glazunov – famous painter, member of Russian Academy of Arts, founder and rector of Russian Fine Arts Academy, Andrey Sakharov – director of Institute of Russian History of Russian Academy of Science. Museum workers award list includes both major museums and reservations: “Kizhi”, “Pavlovsk”, “Khmelita”, “Borodinskoye pole” and small ones: house-museum of Ioann Kronshtadsky, museums of Far-Eastern Technological University (Vladivostok), Museum of Russian script of O.N.Trubachev (Volgograd).

== The bonus fund ==
The winners are rewarded with an imagery of St. Alexander Nevsky.

The bonus fund totals 1,800,000 rubles.

- 1st prize – 300,000 rubles
- 2nd prize – 200,000 rubles
- 3rd prize – 100,000 rubles

The recipients of the short list are rewarded with 50,000 rubles. All winners are awarded with honorary diplomas of the prize.
