= Aleksandr Khvan =

Russian film director (1957–2023)

- Born: 28 December 1957; Cheboksary, Chuvash ASSR, Russian SFSR, USSR
- Died: 17 September 2023 (aged 65); Moscow, Russia
- Occupations: film director, actor
- Years active: 1991–2006

Aleksandr Fyodorovich Khvan (Russian: Александр Фёдорович Хван; 28 December 1957 – 17 September 2023) was a Russian film director and actor. His debut film Dyuba-Dyuba was entered into the 1993 Cannes Film Festival. He died on 17 September 2023, at the age of 65.

== Filmography ==
- Dominus (1990)
- Dyuba-Dyuba (1992)
- The Arrival of a Train (1995)
- Good Rubbish, Bad Rubbish (1998)
- It Is Easy to Die (1999)
- Shatun (2001)
- Carmen (2003)
