= Vladimir Makeranets =

Russian film director (1947–2024)

- Владимир Макеранец
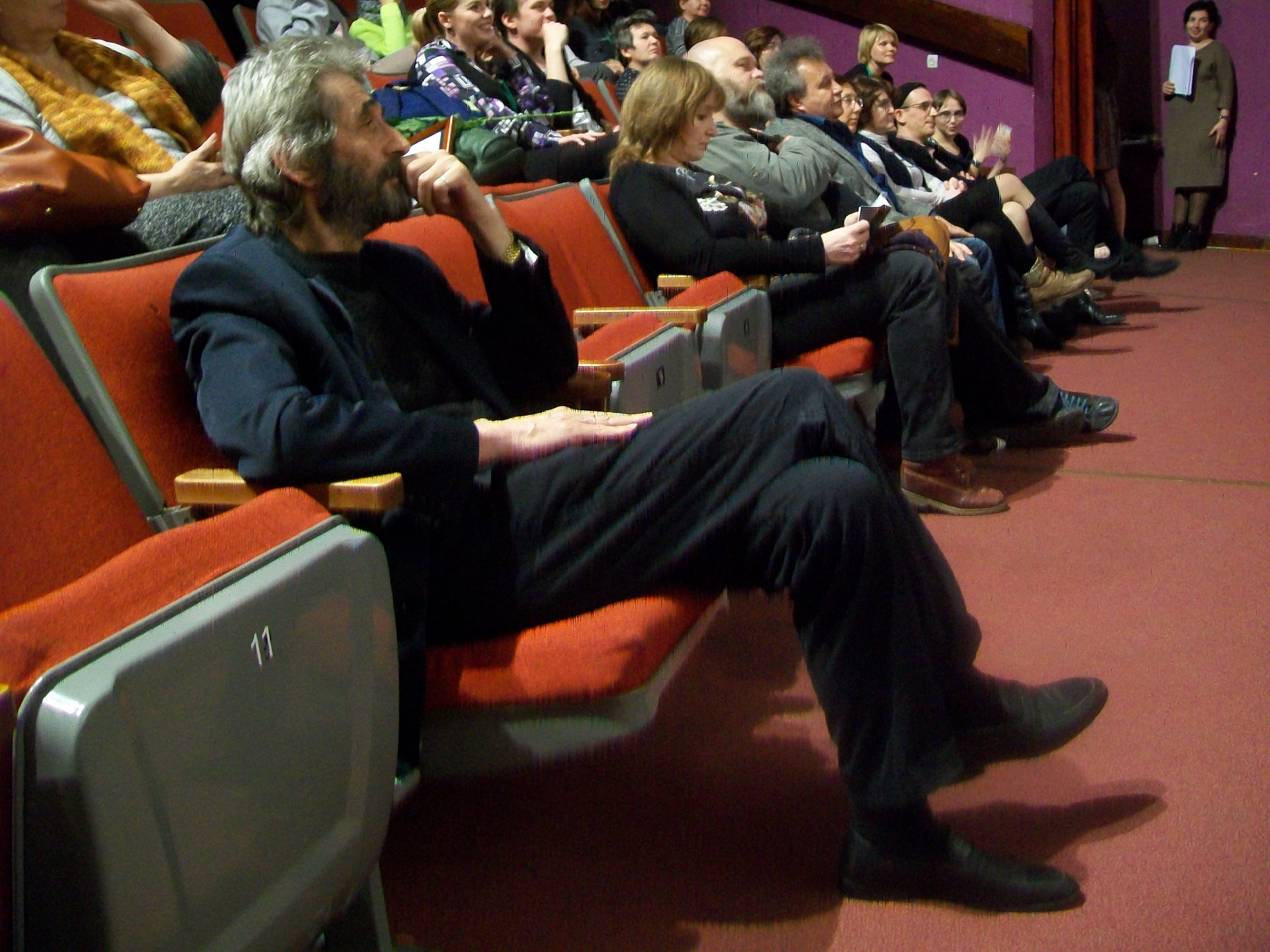
- Makeranets in 2017
- Born: 6 May 1947; Sverdlovsk, Russian SFSR, Soviet Union
- Died: 20 February 2024 (aged 76); Yekaterinburg, Sverdlovsk Oblast, Ural, Russia
- Occupation(s): Director of photography, producer, film director, union leader.

Vladimir Ilyich Makeranets (Russian: Влади́мир Ильи́ч Макера́нец; 6 May 1947 – 20 February 2024) was a Soviet and Russian director of photography, producer and film director, Head of the Ural Department of the Russian Union of Filmmakers, and president of the Ural Guild of Cinematographers.

== Biography ==
Vladimir Makeranets was born in Sverdlovsk. He worked at the Sverdlovsk Film Studio from the time when he was 16, and graduated from the Gerasimov Institute of Cinematography in 1979. In 1980 he joined the Union of Filmmakers. As a director of photography, he worked on 56 films, including live action and documentary films. He directed five films.

Makeranets died in Yekaterinburg on 20 February 2024, at the age of 76.

== Selected filmography ==
- 2007: The Golden Snake (Золотой полоз) — director, producer
- 2001: Privet, malysh! (Привет, малыш!, lit. "Hi baby!") — director, screenwriter
- 1995: Bench Tests (Стендовые испытания) — director of photography
- 1993: You Exist... (Ты есть) — director
- 1991: Gubernator (Губернаторъ) — director
- 1990: V polose priboja (В полосе прибоя, lit. "In the Surf Zone") — director of photography
- 1989: Moj milyj Chizh (Мой милый Чиж) — director
- 1988: Serafima Glyukina's Daily Routine and Holidays (Будни и праздники Серафимы Глюкиной) — director of photography
- 1986: Vremja svidanij (Время свиданий, lit. "Dating time") — director of photography
- 1985: In the Shooting Wilderness (В стреляющей глуши) — director of photography
- 1984: Dom na djunah (Дом на дюнах, lit. "The House in the Dunes") — director of photography
- 1983: Semyon Dezhnev (Семён Дежнёв) — director of photography
- 1982: Those who Stay Alive (Тем, кто остается жить) — director of photography
- 1980: On the Bank of a Big River (На берегу большой реки) — director of photography
