= Nothing Personal (2007 film) =

2007 film

- Film poster
- Directed by: Larisa Sadilova
- Written by: Larisa Sadilova
- Produced by: Rustam Akhadov
- Starring: Valeriy Barinov
- Release date: 28 June 2007
- Running time: 97 minutes
- Country: Russia
- Language: Russian

Nothing Personal (Russian: Ничего личного, romanized: Nichego lichnogo) is a 2007 Russian drama film written and directed by Larisa Sadilova. It was entered into the 29th Moscow International Film Festival. It won the FIPRESCI prize in 2007.

== Plot ==
Private detective Vladimir Zimin receives an order for video surveillance of an apartment. Having successfully installed the bugs and micro-cameras, he begins surveillance. Soon it turns out that the owner of the apartment, Irina, works in a drugstore and suffers from an unsettled personal life. Zimin begins to doubt that anyone can be so interested in the life of this lonely woman, that for one day in her life he is offered 500 dollars. Finally it turns out that the customer confused the apartment and the right woman lives next door. She turns out to be an attractive blonde, who is often visited by a lover, a young businessman who is also an aspiring politician.

Having switched to the new target, Zimin, however, is not in a hurry to part with his former ward.

== Cast ==
- Valeriy Barinov as Zimin
- Zoya Kaydanovskaya as Irina
- Mariya Leonova as Blonde
- Shukhrat Irgashev as Zimin's chief
- Natalya Kochetova as Zimin's wife
- Aleksandr Klyukvin as Rich lover
