= Vera Storozheva =

Russian actress

- Born: 7 September 1958 (age 67); Troitsk, Chelyabinsk Oblast, USSR (now Russia)
- Occupations: Actress; Film director
- Years active: 1990–present

Vera Storozheva (born 7 September 1958) is a Russian actress and film director. She has directed nine films since 2002. Her 2007 film Travelling with Pets won the Golden George at the 29th Moscow International Film Festival.

== Selected filmography ==
=== As actress ===
- The Asthenic Syndrome (1990)
- Three Stories (1997)

=== As director ===
- The French Guy (2004)
- Travelling with Pets (2007)
- My Boyfriend Is an Angel (2011)
- House for rent with all the inconveniences, (Сдаётся дом со всеми неудобствами) (2016)
- Mariya. Spasti Moskvu (2021)
