= Lidia Bobrova =

Russian film director (born 1952)

Lidia Bobrova (born 13 June 1952) is a Russian film director born in Zabaikalsk, Soviet Union (now Russia). One of her films was Granny, which earned her a special jury prize at the Karlovy Vary International Film Festival in 2003.

== Early life ==
Lidyia Bobrova was born in 1952 in the far east area of Amur. She studied History in university before moving on to the study of screen writing and directing.

== Career ==
After graduating from VKSR (Higher Courses for Scriptwriters and Directors) Bobrova started making films in 1991. Her directorial debut Oi, vy, gusi (Hey, You Geese, 1991), depicted the life of three brothers struggling a world that has forgotten them. Her next film was V toi strane (In That Land..., 1997) which followed life in a Russian village in the 1890s.

The film was critically acclaimed but was not accepted into the Moscow Film Festival due to "unprofessionalism." While it was successful abroad it never achieved the same success in Russia.

Her next film Babusia was her most successful winning the audience prize in the Paris film festival in 2003. Following a granny in Russia who takes care of her children, grand-children and neighbours children.

Eight years later Bobrova released her final film, Veruiui (I Believe, dir. Lydia Bobrova 2006) based on three short stories by Vasilii Shukshin adapted for a more modern period.

== Style ==
Bobrova was heavily influenced by village life in Russia often centring her movies around Russian villages and the slow pace of rural life. Her films juxtaposed wide shots of Russian landscapes with confined interiors of farm houses. Depicting a world where the central characters of her films struggled to survive against harsh natural elements.

Dedicating her career to representing life in Russian farm lands. Bobrova created a filmography based around glubinka, Russian rural peasant life which she grew up in.

She has been described as a member of the Russian new wave, with her films being released in the years immediately after the fall of communism.

Her films deal with preoccupations of nature and societal fabric. Scholars have argued that these traditional examinations of society are an examination of the current life in Russia. She represents these movies with long takes, realist mis-en-scene and static camera work.

Bobrova, took realism to a high degree even using non-professional actors even in critical roles, such as the titular grandmother in Babusyia.

== Gender themes ==
Bobrova foregrounds gender in her filmography. Her award winning film Babousia examines the life of a grandmother as her family changes in the soviet era. The struggling matriarch in Babuysia for one, in other films Bobrova has reversed traditional gender norms, depicting women doing tasks of physical labour or men doing domestic work.

Family relationships and brotherly connection are at the centre of her first film Oi, vy, gusi. Examining their male relationship. Her films correlate male cultivation of land toward Russian communist values or oppose them.

Bobrova expands on this parable throughout her filmography, with the question of women as primary caretakers at the forefront of her work. She also uses age as a cinematic technique of representation in her work. By drawing on the difference between the ages of siblings in Oi, vy, gusi or the grandmother, this aging becomes symbolic of relationships with the past and spirituality.
