= János Szász =

Hungarian film director

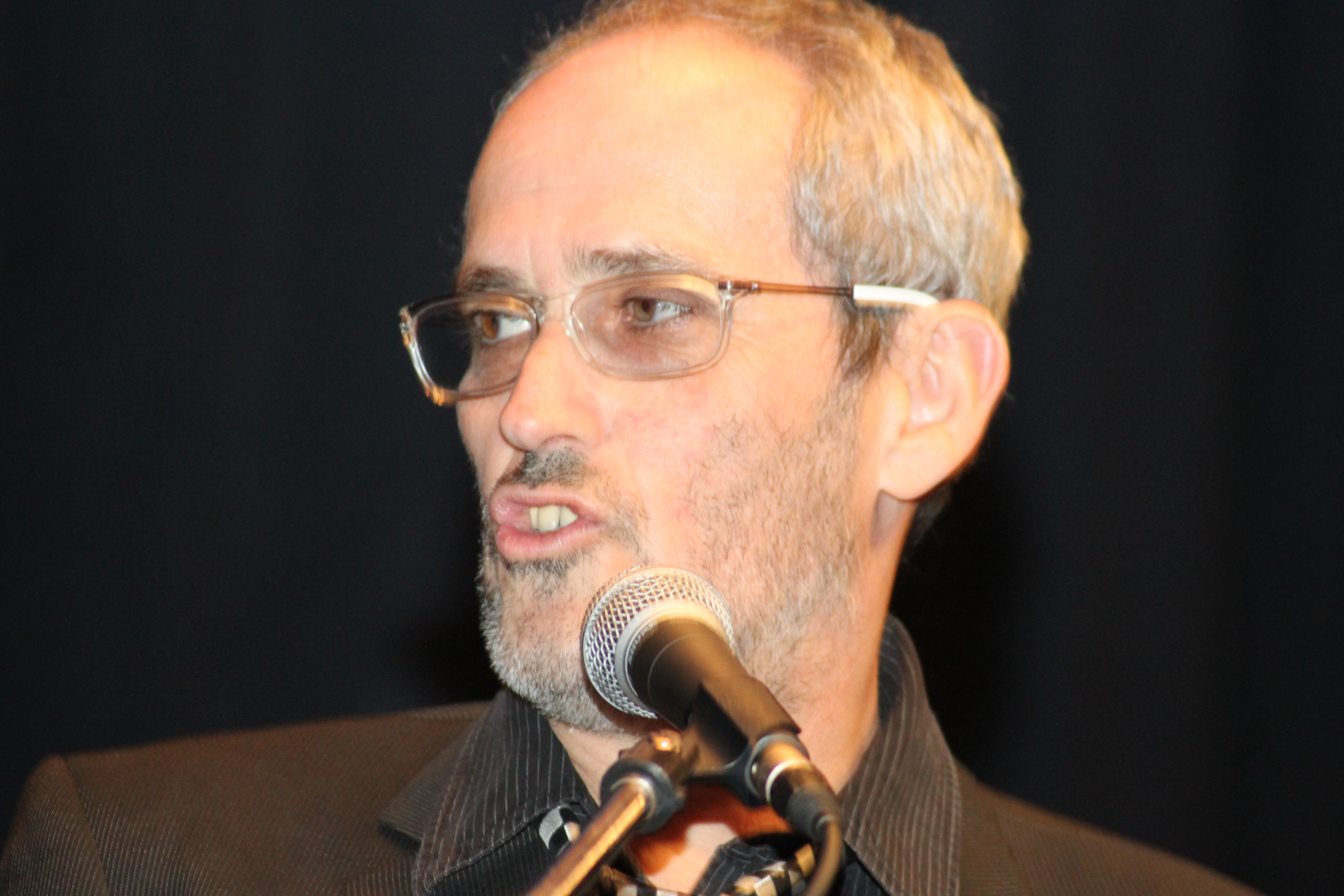
- 48th International Film Festival Karlovy Vary in July 2013
- Born: 14 March 1958 (age 68); Budapest, Hungary
- Occupations: Film director Screenwriter
- Years active: 1983-present

János Szász (born 14 March 1958) is a Hungarian film director, screenwriter and theater director. He has directed eleven films since 1983. His film Witman fiúk was screened in the Un Certain Regard section at the 1997 Cannes Film Festival and was entered into the 20th Moscow International Film Festival. His 2007 film Opium: Diary of a Madwoman was entered into the 29th Moscow International Film Festival.

Szász was the Director of the American Repertory Theater Institute and a faculty member from March 2001. He has directed numerous theatrical productions including six stagings with the American Repertory Theater.

== Filmography ==
- Tavaszi zápor (1983)
- Escorial (1984)
- A léderer-ügy (1985)
- Utóirat (1987)
- Szédülés (1990)
- Woyzeck (1994)
- Witman fiúk (1997)
- Temetés (1998)
- A Holocaust szemei (2000)
- Ópium: Egy elmebeteg nö naplója (2007)
- The Notebook (2013)
