= Yegor Letov discography =

This is a discography of the Russian poet and musician Yegor Letov.

== Grazhdanskaya Oborona ==
=== Studio albums ===
- Poganaya molodyozh' (Foul Youth) (1985)
- Optimizm (Optimism) (1985)
- Myshelovka (Mousetrap) (1987)
- Khorosho!! (Good!) (1987)
- Totalitarizm (Totalitarianism) (1987)
- Nekrofiliya (Necrophilia) (1987)
- Krasnyy albom (Red Album) (1987)
- Vse idet po planu (Everything is going according to the plan) (1988)
- Tak zakalyalas stal (This is how the steel was tempered) (1988)
- Boevoi stimul (Combat Stimulus) (1988)
- Toshnota (Nausea) (1989)
- Pesni radosti i schastya (Songs of joy and happiness) (1989)
- Zdorovo i vechno (Great and eternal) (1989)
- Armageddon-pops (Armageddon-pops)(1989)
- Voina (War) (1989)
- Russkoe pole eksperimentov (Russian Field of Experiments) (1989)
- Instruktsiya po vyzhivaniyu (Instructions for survival) (1990)
- Solntsevorot (Solstice) (1995)
- Nevynosimaya legkost bytiya (The unbearable lightness of being) (1996)
- Zvezdopad (Starfall) (2001)
- Dolgaya schastlivaya zhizn (Long happy life) (2004)
- Reanimatsiya (Reanimation) (2005)
- Zachem snyatsya sny? (Why do we have dreams) (2007)

=== Live albums ===
- Russky proryv v Leningrade (Russian Breakthrough in Leningrad) (1994)
- Kontsert v MEI 17.02.90 (Concert in MEI (17.02.90)) (1996)
- Posledny kontsert v Talline (The Last Concert in Tallinn) (1996)
- Kontsert (Concert) (1997)
- Svet i stulya (Chairs and Lights) (2001)
- XX let (20 years) (2006)
- Vystuplenie v klube Rok-Siti (Performance at the Rock City Club) (2007)
- Apelsin: Elektrichestvo (Orange: Electricity) (2010)

=== Compilations ===
- Istoriya: Posev 1982-1985 (History: Posev 1982-1985) (1989)
- Khuy cherez plecho (Cock over your shoulder) ( (1990)
- Pops (album) (Pops) (1992)
- Legendy russkogo roka (Legends of Russian rock) (2001)
- Poezd ushel (The Train left) (2002)

=== Singles ===
- "Elektrichesky Pyos" (Electric Dog) (2012)

== Yegor i Opizdenevshiye ==
- Pryg-skok (Jump-skip) (1990)
- Sto let odinochestva (100 years of solitude) (1992)
- Psychodelia Tomorrow (Psychodelia Tomorrow) (2000)

== Kommunizm ==
- Na sovetskoi skorosti (At Soviet speed) (1988)
- Suleiman Stalsky (Suleyman Stalsky) (1988)
- Veselyashchy gaz (Laughing gas) (1989)
- Rodina slyshit (The motherland hears) (1989)
- Soldatsky son (Soldier's Dream) (1989)
- Chudo-muzyka (Miracle Music) (1989)
- Narodovedenie (Folk Studies) (1989)
- Satanizm (Satanism) (1989)
- Zhizn, chto skazka (Life is like a Fairy Tale) (1989)
- Let It Bi (Let it Be) (1989)
- Igra v samoletiki pod krovatyu (The Airplane Game under the bed) (1989)
- Leniniana (Leniniana) (1989)
- 13 (13) (1990)
- Khronika pikiruyushchego bombardirovshchika (Chronicle of a Dive Bomber) (1990)
- Blagodat: The Best of Kommunizm (Grace: The Best of Communism) (1990)
- Granitsa schastya (The Border of Happiness) (2021)

== Solo work ==
=== Studio albums ===
- Russkoe pole eksperimenta (akustika) (Russian Fields of Experiments (Acoustic)) (1988)
- Vershki i koreshki (Tops and Roots) (1989)
- Vse kak u lyudei (Everything is like other people) (1989)
- Muzyka vesny (Music of Spring) (1994)

=== Live albums ===
- Kontsert v Gorode-Geroe Leningrade (Concert in the hero-city Leningrad) (1994)
- Kontsert v O.G.I. (Concert in O.G.I) (2002) (with Sergei Letov)
- Apelsin: Akustika (Orange: Acoustic) (2006)

=== Compilations ===
- Izbrannoe (Favourites) (2006)
