= Instruktsiya po vyzhivaniyu =

Studio album by Grazhdanskaya Oborona
- Released: 1990
- Recorded: GrOb Studio, 31 March-4 April 1990
- Genre: Post-punk; noise rock; garage rock; psychedelic rock
- Length: 50:09; 67:34 (2013 remix/remaster); 75:15 (2016 CD release)
- Label: GrOb; XOP/Moroz (2001 CD/MC reissue); Wyrgorod/Neuro Empire (2013 LP reissue); Bull Terrier (2016 CD reissue)
- Producer: Yegor Letov

Grazhdanskaya Oborona chronology
| Russkoe pole eksperimentov (1989) | Instruktsiya po vyzhivaniyu (1990) | Solntsevorot (1995) |

Alternative cover
- The cover as used on the 2001 CD release by XOP/Moroz

Instruktsiya po vyzhivaniyu (Russian: Инструкция по выживанию, Instructions for Survival) is the 17th album by the Russian punk band Grazhdanskaya Oborona, released in 1990. It was their final album before their break up a week later (they played their final concert in Tallinn on the 13th of April, 9 days after the album was mixed), but they reformed in 1993.

The album's songs are covers of songs by the band Instruktsiya po Vyzhivaniyu. The songs were written between 1986 and 1989. After IPV's lead singer Roman Neumoev converted to Christianity, he gave the songs to Letov, telling him he could use them in whatever way he wanted. Letov decided to record a tribute to IPV using these songs.

The LP issue in 2013 has five bonus tracks taken from these sessions and the sessions for the Yegor i Opizdenevshiye album Pryg-skok. In 2016, it was released on CD by Bull Terrier Records, including two extra bonus tracks.

The album has two different renditions of "Posvyashchenie A. Kruchonkyh" and "Nepreryvny suicid". Track 2 was sung by Igor Zhevtun, while track 12 was sung by Yegor Letov. The two versions of the song differ in the first line of the final verse - the word "menty" (cops) in the line "Я подамся в менты, в педерасты, в поэты, в монахи" (I'll become a cop, a queer, a poet, a monk) on track 2 was changed to "zhidy" (kikes) on track 12.

== Track list ==
| No. | Title | Writer(s) | Transliteration | Length |
|---|---|---|---|---|
| 1. | "Непрерывный суицид" (Unlimited Suicide) | Роман Неумоев | Nepreryvnyy suitsid | 3:53 |
| 2. | "Посвящение А. Кручёных" (Dedication to Aleksei Kruchenykh) | Miroslav Nemirov, Роман Неумоев, Aleksei Kruchenykh | Posvyashchenie A. Kruchyonykh | 2:31 |
| 3. | "Моя северная страна" (My Northern Country) | Юрий Крылов, Роман Неумоев | Moya severnaya strana | 2:40 |
| 4. | "А у мира час до полночи" (And at Peace, There's One Hour to Midnight) | Роман Неумоев | A u mira chas do polnochi | 3:51 |
| 5. | "Рок-н-ролльный фронт" (Rock 'n Roll Front) | Роман Неумоев, Кирилл Рыбьяков, Юрий Крылов | Rok-n-roll'nyy front | 3:51 |
| 6. | "Товарищ Горбачёв" (Comrade Gorbachev) | Мирослав Немиров | Tovarishch Gorbachyov | 5:40 |
| 7. | "Афганский синдром" (Afghan Syndrome) | Роман Неумоев | Afganskiy sindrom | 2:34 |
| 8. | "Всё пройдёт" (Everything Will Pass) | Роман Неумоев | Vsyo proydyot | 4:11 |
| 9. | "Красный смех" (Red Laugh) | Роман Неумоев | Krasnyy smekh | 3:00 |
| 10. | "Нож в спину" (Knife in the back) | Роман Неумоев | Nozh v spinu | 2:25 |
| 11. | "Корона" (Crown) | Роман Неумоев | Korona | 3:45 |
| 12. | "Посвящение А. Кручёных №2" | Miroslav Nemirov, Роман Неумоев, Alexei Kruchenykh | Posvyashchenie A. Kruchyonykh №2 | 2:28 |
| 13. | "Родина-Смерть" (Motherland-Death) | Роман Неумоев | Rodina-Smert' | 3:02 |
| 14. | "Хуй" (Dick) | Роман Неумоев, Мирослав Немиров | Khuy | 3:15 |
| 15. | "Непрерывный суицид №2" (Unlimited Suicide №2) | Роман Неумоев | Nepreryvnyy suitsid №2 | 4:08 |

Bonus tracks on Neuro Empire reissue, 2013 and Bull Terrier reissue, 2016
| No. | Title | Writer(s) | Length |
|---|---|---|---|
| 16. | "А у мира час до полночи" | Роман Неумоев | 3:49 |
| 17. | "Нож в спину" | Роман Неумоев | 2:38 |
| 18. | "Непрерывный суицид" | Роман Неумоев | 3:12 |
| 19. | "Моя северная страна" | Юрий Крылов, Роман Неумоев | 2:40 |
| 20. | "Красный смех" | Роман Неумоев | 3:36 |

Bonus tracks on Bull Terrier reissue, 2016
| No. | Title | Writer(s) | Length |
|---|---|---|---|
| 21. | "Красный смех" | Роман Неумоев | 3:42 |
| 22. | "Непрерывный суицид" | Роман Неумоев | 3:16 |

== Personnel ==
- Igor "Jeff" Zhevtun - guitar, vocals, backing vocals
- Yegor Letov – vocals, guitars, bass guitar, drums, production
- Konstantin "Kuzya UO" Ryabinov - keyboards, saxophone, backing vocals

== Legacy ==
In 2008, shortly before his death, Letov answered a fan's question on the GrOb website, saying the album would never be reissued, stating "there is no such album". This was partly due to his conflict with Roman Neumoev in the late 1990s and 2000s. However, his widow Natalia Chumakova remastered the album in late 2011. The remaster was reissued on double vinyl in 2013 by Neuro Empire.

The remaster was also remixed: changes include a missing stick hit from the beginning of "Nepreryvnyy suitsid" (track 1) being restored, the fade out of the final chord in "Moya severnaya strana" having some laughter from Letov added, the feedback in the beginning of "Rodina-Smert'" starting up straight away instead of fading in and "Khuy" being slower (presumably the original speed of the song) and ending slightly differently.

5 bonus tracks were also included, among them being the original Yegor i Opizdenevshiye version of "Krasny smekh", recorded in 1990 and released on vinyl and CD on BSA, but being left off the 2006 CD reissue of Pryg-skok for the same copyright reasons precluding this album's reissue. The original version on the album was faded out, however this version had the natural ending of the song. The version of "Nepreryvnyy suitsid" recorded for Pryg-skok under the title "Pro malinovuyu devochku" was not included, however it would be on the CD release of the remaster three years later.

Zhevtun, who substituted for Letov on two tracks due to the similarity between their voices, participated in GrOb's 35th anniversary reunion tour in 2019 as lead vocalist and guitarist.
