= Vsyo idyot po planu =

Studio album by Grazhdanskaya Oborona
- Released: 1988
- Recorded: January 1988
- Studio: GrOb Studio
- Genre: Anarcho-punk; noise rock; post-punk; punk rock
- Length: 29:45
- Label: GrOb; Hor Music (1996 CD/MC reissue); Misteriya Zvuka (2007 expanded CD reissue)
- Producer: Yegor Letov

Grazhdanskaya Oborona chronology
Krasny albom (1987)	Vsyo idyot po planu (1988)	Tak zakalyalas' stal (1988)

Vsyo idyot po planu (Russian: Всё идёт по плану, lit. 'Everything is going according to plan') is the eighth studio album by Soviet/Russian punk band Grazhdanskaya Oborona. The album was recorded and released in 1988 by Yegor Letov in Omsk. It was the first album from the 1988 album series (with «Tak zakalyalas' stal», and «Boyevoy stimul»). The title track of this album was one of the band's most popular songs.

== Background ==
In 1987 Letov immediately left the city with his then-partner, the fellow Siberian songwriter Yanka Dyagileva, and spent the entire year in hiding, hitch-hiking across the country until the prosecution was stopped in December 1987 with the help of Letov's relatives. In winter 1988 Letov returned home and recorded three more albums (also released under the name of Grazhdanskaya Oborona) in his home "studio", known as "GrOb Records". In the same year the reunited band started touring across the USSR.

The title track «Vsyo idyot po planu» (Everything is going according to plan) became much more famous than its author. The song was conceived as a confession of a simple Soviet citizen who came home tired. He sees the world around him and sings about this terrible world. The lyrics of the album have an acute social and political mood. Letov sang all the songs and played all the instruments, but Kuzya UO and Oleg Sudakov took part in the song as backing vocalists.

== Track listing ==
All tracks are written by Yegor Letov, except 12 by Oleg Sudakov and Yegor Letov.

No.	Title	Length
1.	"Prolog (Prologue)"	0:53
2.	"Kakoye Nyebo (What's Sky)"	0:35
3.	"Sistema (System)"	2:28
4.	"Iuda budyet v rayu (Judas will be in Paradise)"	1:57
5.	"Svoyo govno ne pakhnet (Own Shit Doesn't Smell)"	1:19
6.	"Prodolzhaya prodolzhat' (Continuing on continuing)"	1:19
7.	"Povezlo (Lucky)"	1:57
8.	"Obschestvo Pamyat' (“Memory” Society)"	1:43
9.	"Lapsha (Noodle)"	0:10
10.	"Vtoroy Eshelon (Second Echelon)"	1:48
11.	"Chelovek cheloveku volk (A Man Is A Wolf To Another Man)"	1:53
12.	"Les (Forest)"	2:33
13.	"Suitsid (Suicide)"	2:44
14.	"Gosudarstvo (State)"	2:10
15.	"Odnazhdy (Once Upon A Time)"	0:04
16.	"Vsyo idyot po planu (Everything is going according to plan)"	4:58
17.	"Final (Final)"	1:10
18.	"Vot kakoye nyebo (That's Sky)"	0:05

== Personnel ==
=== Grazhdanskaya Oborona ===
- Yegor Letov – vocals, guitars, bass guitar, drums, production
- Oleg Sudakov – backing vocals
- Konstantin Ryabinov (Kuzya UO) – backing vocals

=== Technical ===
- Yegor Letov – art design, photography
- Sergey Letov – remastering
- Natalia Chumakova – remastering
