= Russkoe pole eksperimentov =

1989 Soviet punk album by Grazhdanskaya Oborona

Studio album by Grazhdanskaya Oborona
- Released: 1989
- Recorded: May–September 1989
- Studio: GrOb Studio
- Genres: Post-hardcore; noise rock; alternative rock; punk rock
- Length: 32:38
- Labels: GrOb; Hor Music (1996 CD/MC reissue); Misteriya Zvuka (2007 expanded CD reissue)
- Producer: Yegor Letov

Grazhdanskaya Oborona chronology
Armageddon-pops (1989)	Russkoe pole eksperimentov (1989)	Instruktsiya po vyzhivaniyu (1990)

Russkoe pole eksperimentov (Russian: Русское поле экспериментов, Russian field of experiments) is the seventeenth studio album by Soviet/Russian punk band Grazhdanskaya Oborona. The songs reflect the influence of noise punk, hardcore and industrial music and contain dark lyrics inspired by existentialist philosophy and literature. The final title track's length is almost 15 minutes.

In 2010, Afisha ranked the album at 25 on its list of «The 50 Greatest Russian Albums of All Time».

== Release ==
The album was released in autumn 1989. It was the last album from the 1989 album series (Pesni radosti i schast'ya, Zdorovo i vechno, Voyna and «Armageddon-pops) and one of the band's most popular albums.

== Background ==
In 1988 Grazhdanskaya Oborona recruited a full band: Yegor Letov as lead singer and guitarist, his friend Kuzya «UO» on guitar and bass, Igor Zhevtun («Jeff») as a lead guitarist and Arkady Klimkin on drums. In 1989 they played records at the Auktyon rehearsal point and then recorded music in Letov's apartment.

The songs "Lobotomiya" and "Vershki i koreshki" were dedicated to the memory of the late Dmitry Selivanov and were originally written for the musical project Kommunizm. The title track quotes Bertrand Russell: "A smell of petroleum prevails throughout" (In Letov's interpretation "Eternity smells like petroleum"/Russian: Вечность пахнет нефтью). Letov considered this song one of his best compositions.

== Track listing ==
All tracks are written by Yegor Letov.

No.	Title	Length
1.	"Kak Smetana (Like A Sour Cream)"	0:44
2.	"Vershki I Koreshki (Tops And Roots)"	2:11
3.	"Beri Shinel' / Like A Rolling Stone (Take Your Greatcoat / Like A Rolling Stone)"	2:12
4.	"Novogodnyaya Pesenka (New Year's Song)"	1:20
5.	"Neponyatnaya Pesenka (Incomprehensible Song)"	2:57
6.	"Lobotomiya (Lobotomy)"	2:56
7.	"Zombi (Zombies)"	1:45
8.	"I Snova Temno (It's Dark Again)"	1:58
9.	"Zaplata Na Zaplate (Patch on Patch)"	2:25
10.	"Russkoe pole eksperimentov (Russian field of experiments)"	14:17

== Personnel ==
=== Grazhdanskaya Oborona ===
- Yegor Letov – vocals, guitars, bass guitars, production
- Konstantin Ryabinov (Kuzya UO) – backing vocals, guitars, bass guitars, flute
- Igor Zhevtun (Jeff) – guitars, percussion on «Beri Shinel' / Like A Rolling Stone»
- Yanka Dyagileva – backing vocals on «Beri Shinel' / Like A Rolling Stone»
- Sergey Zelensky – bass on «Lobotomiya»
- Arkady Klimkin – drums

=== Technical ===
- Yegor Letov – art design, album design, remastering (1989, 2007)
- Natalia Chumakova – photography, album design, remastering (2007)
