= Na sovetskoy skorosti =

Studio album by Kommunizm
- Released: 1988, 2003, 2013 (actual dates); 1964 (originally dated)
- Studios: GrOb-studio, Omsk
- Genres: Art punk, punk rock, spoken word, musique concrete
- Length: 41:21 (Samizdat); 41:05 (Hor)
- Language: Russian
- Labels: GrOb records, Hor, Wyrgorod
- Producer: Egor Letov

Kommunizm chronology
Na sovetskoy skorosti (1988)	Suleyman Stalsky (1988)

Na sovetskoy skorosti (Russian: На советской скорости, lit. 'On a soviet speed') — is a debut album by a conceptual project-band "Kommunizm", recorded in January 1988 by Egor Letov, Konstantin Ryabinov and Oleg Sudakov. The album features songs with lyrics written by famous Soviet poets, taken from the Soviet song book containing songs from the Khruschev period.

== Background ==
The album's core concept was the theme of communism and Khrushchevism - the album itself was originally dated 1964, with the following credits:

- Konstantin Ustinych – vocals (actually Sudakov)
- Nikita Sergeevich – vocals, guitar, bass, acoustic guitar (actually Ryabinov)
- Leonid Ilyich – vocals, guitar, bass, drums (actually Letov)

The music for several songs was written and performed by the band members themselves, and they also used foreign and classical music for others.

In 2003, for the first time it was officially released on CD by the Russian label "Hor". Before this, the album was only distributed on reel-to-reel releases - samizdat (just like every other album made by Letov). In 2013, the album was reissued on CD by Wyrgorod.

== Tracklist and Credits ==
No.	Title	English translation	Length
1.	"Здравствуй, труд!"	Hello, labor!	1:40
2.	"Про чудо-чудеса"	About miracles	3:56
3.	"Марш коммунистических бригад"	March of the Communist Brigades	2:26
4.	"Небо тёмно-синее"	Dark-blue sky	2:53
5.	"Это счастье для тебя, человек"	This is happiness for you, human.	2:15
6.	"Когда идёшь ты на свидание"	When you going on a date	0:26
7.	"Куда же ты скрылась?"	Where did you hide?	1:02
8.	"Мы Америку догоним на советской скорости!"	We will catch up with America at Soviet speed!	2:37
9.	"Четыре солдата"	Four soldiers	3:05
10.	"Друзья, за работу!"	Friends, let's get to work!	0:59
11.	"Марш энтузиастов"	March of Enthusiasts	2:56
12.	"Песня кукурузного звена"	Song of the Corn Link	3:07
13.	"Радостно на душе"	Joy in the soul	1:16
14.	"И сказки расскажут о вас"	And fairy tales will tell about you	4:14
15.	"Марш бригад коммунистического труда"	March of the Communist Labor Brigades	3:35
16.	"Шагай, семилетка"	Walk, seven-year plan	5:16
17.	"Финал — Ура!"	Finale - hooray!	0:16

=== Original credits ===
- Nikita Sergeyevich: vocals, lead guitar, bass, acoustic guitar
- Leonid Ilyich: vocals, rhythm guitar, lead guitar, drums
- Konstantin Ustinych: vocals

Recorded: January 30, 1988 at Grob Studio. Producer and engineer: Leonid Ilyich

=== Actual credits ===
- Egor Letov - guitars, drums, vocals
- Konstantin Ryabinov - bass, guitar, vocals
- Oleg Sudakov - vocals

Recorded: January 30, 1988 at Grob Studio. Producer: Egor Letov
