= Zvezdopad =

Studio album by Grazhdanskaya Oborona
- Released: 20 March 2002
- Recorded: GrOb Studio, August 2000-November 2001
- Genres: Art rock, psychedelic rock, shoegaze, noise pop
- Length: 50:29
- Labels: GrOb/XOP/Misteria Zvuka (original CD/MC issue); Wyrgorod/Neuro Empire (2010 CD reissue/2011 LP reissue)
- Producer: Yegor Letov

Grazhdanskaya Oborona chronology
Nevynosimaya legkost bytiya (1997)	Zvezdopad (2002)	Dolgaya schastlivaya zhizn (2004)

Zvezdopad (Russian: Звездопад, meaning "Starfall", i.e., meteor shower in Russian) is the 20th album by the Russian punk band Grazhdanskaya Oborona. The album was released on 20 March 2002 and consists of cover versions of classic Soviet songs of 1960s–1970s.

== History ==
Plans to record an album called Zvezdopad have existed in Yegor Letov's journals since 1994. Many original handwritten track lists can be found at the GrOb website. The album itself was recorded during 2000 and 2001. It was finally released on 20 March 2002 on XOP/Moroz Records.

=== Initial plans ===
Initially, Letov planned to record a diptych, where one part would be in Russian, and the other on in English, including tracks «The Long and Lonesome Road» by Shocking Blue, «I? m Only Sleeping» by The Beatles, «Always See Your Face» by Love, «Hallucinations» by Tomorrow, «Thoughts and Words» by The Byrds, and «Telstar» by The Tornados.

=== The launch of the album ===
The launch party was held at the club "Tochka" in Moscow on 20 and 21 March of that year. The first pressing of the album came in a digipack, containing an absurdist painting of a tree with houses on its branches on the front cover which would later be reused for the CD issue in 2010. The booklet for that issue contained a painting of an antelope in a forest which would later be used on the 2011 vinyl reissue. Future pressings, as well as the Ukrainian first pressing, had an image of the band standing in the snow. That was issued in a standard jewel case.

=== Reissue ===
In 2010, the album was reissued by Wyrgorod, who added three bonus tracks: a track called "Zachem snyatsya sny", recorded in the Zvezdopad sessions with bassist Natalia Chumakova on vocals and live versions of "Solnce vzoidet" and the Kommunizm song Tuman, recorded live at an Yegor Letov concert in Barnaul in 2003. The 2011 vinyl reissue included a version of "Karavella" with Chumakova on vocals, in a jazz pop style evocative of Norah Jones. When originally recorded in 2000, the songs were instrumentals - Chumakova recorded her vocals in September 2007 when remastering the album.

== Track listing ==
No.	Title	Lyrics	Music	Year	Length
1.	"Песня красноармейца (Song of the Red Army man)" (из телефильма Kortik)	Bulat Okudzhava	Stanislav Pozhlakov	1973	2:35
2.	"Песня о циркаче (The song about a circus man)"	Mikhail Ancharov	Ilya Katayev	1959	2:37
3.	"На дальней станции сойду (I will get off at a distant station)"	Mikhail Tanich	Vladimir Shainsky		4:25
4.	"Шла война (The war went on)"	Bulat Okudzhava	Bulat Okudzhava	1960-1961	3:10
5.	"Звездопад, Zvezdopad"	Nikolai Dobronravov	Aleksandra Pakhmutova	1965	2:50
6.	"Ветер северный(The Northern wind)"	Inna Goff	Yan Frenkel		2:05
7.	"Город детства(Childhood town)"	Robert Rozhdestvensky	Frank Miller		5:01
8.	"На всю оставшуюся жизнь(For the rest of his life)" (from «For the Rest of His Life»)	Pyotr Fomenko	Veniamin Basner		3:01
9.	"Слово — Товарищ(Word — Comrade)"	Mikhail Ancharov	Ilya Katayev	1972	2:51
10.	"Каравелла(Caravella)"	В. Калле	В. Калле		2:45
11.	"Белое безмолвие(White silence)"	Vladimir Vysotsky	Vladimir Vysotsky	1972	3:27
12.	"Красный конь(Red horse)"	Mikhail Plyatskovsky	Mark Fradkin		1:02
13.	"Песенка про чёрную гуашь и надежду(The song about black paint and hope)"	Vera Matveyeva	Vera Matveyeva		1:41
14.	"Солнце взойдёт(The Sun will rise)" (from «The Bremen Town Musicians»)	Yuri Entin	Gennady Gladkov	1973	4:40
15.	"Я принял решение(I have decided)"	Grigory Pozhenyan	Mikael Tariverdiev		1:57
16.	"Свой среди чужих(Our man among strangers)" (from «At Home Among Strangers»)		Eduard Artemyev		5:18

Bonus tracks from the reissue 2010
No.	Title	Lyrics	Music	Length
17.	"Зачем снятся сны"	Robert Rozhdestvensky	Stanislav Pozhlakov	5:34
18.	"Туман" (live)	Kim Ryzhov	Aleksandr Kolker	2:23
19.	"Солнце взойдёт" (live)			3:26
