= Psychodelia Tomorrow =

Studio album by Yegor i Opizdenevshiye
- Released: 2001, 2017
- Recorded: 1991–1993, 1999
- Studios: GrOb Studio (Omsk, Russia)
- Genres: Psychedelic rock, folk, ambient, neo-psychedelia
- Length: 71:02
- Language: Russian
- Labels: GrOb Records, UR-realist (2001), Wyrgorod (2017)

Yegor i Opizdenevshiye chronology
Sto let odinochestva (1993)	Psychodelia Tomorrow (2001)	So skorost'yu mira (2003)

Psychodelia Tomorrow (Rus. Психоделия Tomorrow) is the third album by Russian psychedelic band Yegor I Opizdenevshiye. The album was recorded while the band was working on an album Sto let odinochestva. Yegor Letov, The leader of the group originally wanted the album to be a triple album, but due to length of one of the songs, instead they decided to compile a collection of psychedelic tunes. Tracks number 6 and number 8 were included in a compilation album Blagodat by Kommunizm before this album released.

== About the recording process ==
Created and recorded at GrOb Studio in Omsk by Alexander Rozhkov, Konstantin Ryabinov, and Yegor Letov in July 1993 (except for tracks 10, 13, and 15, which were recorded at different times during the work on the album Sto Let Odinochestva by Yegor Letov and Konstantin Ryabinov). "Shla Voyna" was recorded in 1999 by Y. Letov, K. Ryabinov, and E. Pyanov.

The following participated in the recording of the album:

- Alexander Rozhkov: vocals, flute, percussion, guitar (on tracks #1, #2, #12, and #16).
- Konstantin Ryabinov: electric organ, bass, vocals (on track #3), guitars, effects, percussion.
- Yegor Letov: drums, vocals (on track #3), guitars, effects.
- In the song "Shla Voyna": Evgeny Pyanov: guitar strumming.
- In song #15: Igor Zhevtun: guitar.

== Track listing ==
No.	Title	Length
1.	"И Улетел (I Uletel)"	2:27
2.	"No name (02)"	2:16
3.	"03 (Part 1)"	3:27
4.	"Ждать (Zhdat')"	4:28
5.	"No name (05)"	1:42
6.	"С понедельника на пятницу рассчитывали быть, а со вторника суббота подошла к концу опять (S ponedel'nika na py'atnitsu rasschitivali byt', a so vtornika subbota podoshla k kontsu opyat)"	4:30
7.	"No name (07)"	4:03
8.	"Кто будет со мною тама? (Kto budet so mnoyu Tama?)"	3:39
9.	"No name (09)"	5:06
10.	"No name (10)"	5:25
11.	"03 (part 2)"	4:07
12.	"No name (12)"	3:39
13.	"Зачем снятся сны (Zachem snyatsya sni)"	2:40
14.	"Шла война (Shla voyna)"	4:16
15.	"No name (15)"	15:37
16.	"Психоделия Tomorrow (Psychodelia Tomorrow)"	3:35
Total length:		71:02
