= Poganaya molodyozh' =

Poganaya molodyozh

Studio album by Grazhdanskaya Oborona
- Released: 1985, 1988
- Recorded: GrOb Studio, Summer 1985 / 12–22 January 1988
- Genre: Punk rock; noise rock; garage punk
- Length: 42:19
- Label: GrOb
- Producer: Yegor Letov

Grazhdanskaya Oborona chronology
Poganaya molodyozh (1985)	Optimizm (1985)

Alternative cover
- The cover as used on the 2005 CD release by Misteriya Zvuka and the 2011 vinyl release by Stanzmarke

Poganaya molodyozh (Russian: Поганая молодёжь, Nasty/Filthy Youth) is the first studio album by the Russian band Grazhdanskaya Oborona. The album was released in 1985. It was recorded concurrently with its follow-up Optimizm.

Although the copyright date on the album states 1985, it was actually released in 1989 after a series of lengthy revisions.

== Background and recording ==
The original versions of Poganaya molodezh and Optimizm were recorded in 1984 with Yegor Letov and Konstantin Ryabinov (Kuzya UO, Кузя УО) and intended to be a Posev album. In late 1984, when the KGB found out about Poganaya molodezh, the band was forcibly broken up; Kuzya UO was conscripted into the army and Letov was sent to a mental asylum. Three months later, in March 1985, Letov was released.

In 1988, after Ryabinov finished his army service, Letov decided to reconstruct Poganaya molodezh and Optimizm with him. On 12 January of that year, Letov started re-recording both albums. He also included recordings from Posev's final album Reggae, Punk and Rock 'n Roll and a few tracks recorded in July 1985 at the House of Culture "Zvezdny". The project was finished on the 22nd of that month. These re-recordings are now the most common versions.

Yegor Letov played all instruments on the 1988 album. The 1985 album had Letov on vocals and bass and Kuzya Ryabinov on drums and backing vocals. The album had no cover until the 1999 release on XOP, because it was originally distributed via Magnitizdat.

== Track listing ==
No.	Title	Writer(s)	Length
1.	"Поганая молодёжь (Nasty youth)"	Yegor Letov, Konstantin Ryabinov	2:30
2.	"Снаружи всех измерений (Beyond all dimensions)"	Yegor Letov, Andrei Babenko	2:57
3.	"Двоится в глазах (Seeing double)"	Yegor Letov	1:11
4.	"Старость — не радость (Aging is not happiness)"	Yegor Letov, Konstantin Ryabinov	2:46
5.	"Я выдуман напрочь (I am completely made up)"	Yegor Letov	2:06
6.	"Ненавижу женщин (таких, как ты) (I hate women (like you))"	Yegor Letov	3:06
7.	"Поезд на Малую Землю (Train to Malaya Zemlya)"	Yegor Letov	2:04
8.	"Не смешно (Not funny)"	Yegor Letov	2:01
9.	"Мама бля (Mama f*ck)"	Konstantin Ryabinov	4:58
10.	"Лирическое настроение (Lyrical mood)"	Konstantin Ryabinov	0:39
11.	"Клалафуда клалафу (Clalafuda clalafu)"	Yegor Letov, Konstantin Ryabinov	1:48
12.	"Зоопарк (Zoo)"	Yegor Letov	3:03
13.	"Мама, мама… (Mama, mama…)"	Yegor Letov	3:12
14.	"Хватит! (Enough!)"	Yegor Letov	1:19
15.	"Понос - апофеоз (Diarrhea - apotheosis)"	Yegor Letov, Konstantin Ryabinov	0:32

Bonus tracks on 2005 reissue
No.	Title	Writer(s)	Length
16.	"Кто ищет смысл (Who seeks for meaning)"	Yegor Letov	3:59
17.	"Я видел собаку (I saw a dog)"	Konstantin Ryabinov	3:56
18.	"Я блюю на ваши дела (I spew on your cases)"	Yegor Letov, Konstantin Ryabinov	2:12
19.	"Малиновая скала (Crimson rock)"	Yegor Letov	3:08
20.	"Я бесполезен (I'm useless)"	Yegor Letov, Konstantin Ryabinov	3:13
21.	"Детский доктор сказал: „Ништяк“ (из ранних песен Посева) (Pediatrician said: „Cool“ (from the early „Posev“'s songs)"	Yegor Letov, Konstantin Ryabinov	4:17

2011 LP reissue Side A
No.	Title	Writer(s)	Length
1.	"Поганая молодёжь (Nasty youth)"	Yegor Letov, Konstantin Ryabinov	2:30
2.	"Снаружи всех измерений (Beyond all dimensions)"	Yegor Letov, Andrei Babenko	2:57
3.	"Двоится в глазах (Seeing double)"	Yegor Letov	1:11
4.	"Старость — не радость (Aging is not happiness)"	Yegor Letov, Konstantin Ryabinov	2:46
5.	"Я выдуман напрочь (I am completely made up)"	Yegor Letov	2:06
6.	"Поезд на Малую Землю (Train to Malaya Zemlya)"	Yegor Letov	2:04
7.	"Не смешно (Not funny)"	Yegor Letov	2:01

Side B
No.	Title	Writer(s)	Length
8.	"Мама бля (Mama f*ck)"	Konstantin Ryabinov	4:58
9.	"Блюз (никак не называется) (Blues (unnamed))"		2:01
10.	"Лирическое настроение (Lirical (sic) mood)"	Konstantin Ryabinov	0:39
11.	"Клалафуда клалафу (Clalafuda clalafu)"	Yegor Letov, Konstantin Ryabinov	1:48
12.	"Зоопарк (Zoo)"	Yegor Letov	3:03
13.	"Мама, мама… (Mama, mama…)"	Yegor Letov	3:12
14.	"Хватит! (Enough!)"	Yegor Letov	1:19
15.	"Понос - апофеоз (Diarrhea - apotheosis)"	Yegor Letov, Konstantin Ryabinov	0:32
16.	"В садике (In the kindergarten)"		0:38

For unspecified reasons, "Nenavizhu zhenshchin" was left off the vinyl and replaced with "Blues (nikak ne nazyvaetsya)", which had previously appeared on "Khorosho!!" and the 1999 XOP/Moroz reissue of Poganaya molodezh. "V sadike" later appeared on the 2007 CD reissue of Istoriya: Posev 1982-1985 on Misteria Zvuka.

== Original version ==
1. Ya blyuyu na vashi tela
2. Nenavizhu zhenshchin
3. Detsky mir
4. Matushka
5. Poganaya molodezh
6. Ne smeshno
7. Ya vyduman naproch
8. Ya bespolezen
9. Daite
10. Ey, babishcha blevani
11. Mama blya
12. Na nashikh glazakh
13. Detsky doktor skazal: "Nishtyak"
14. Sumasshedshy
15. Khvatit!
16. Ponos apofeoz
