= Instruktsiya po Vyzhivaniyu =

Russian rock band

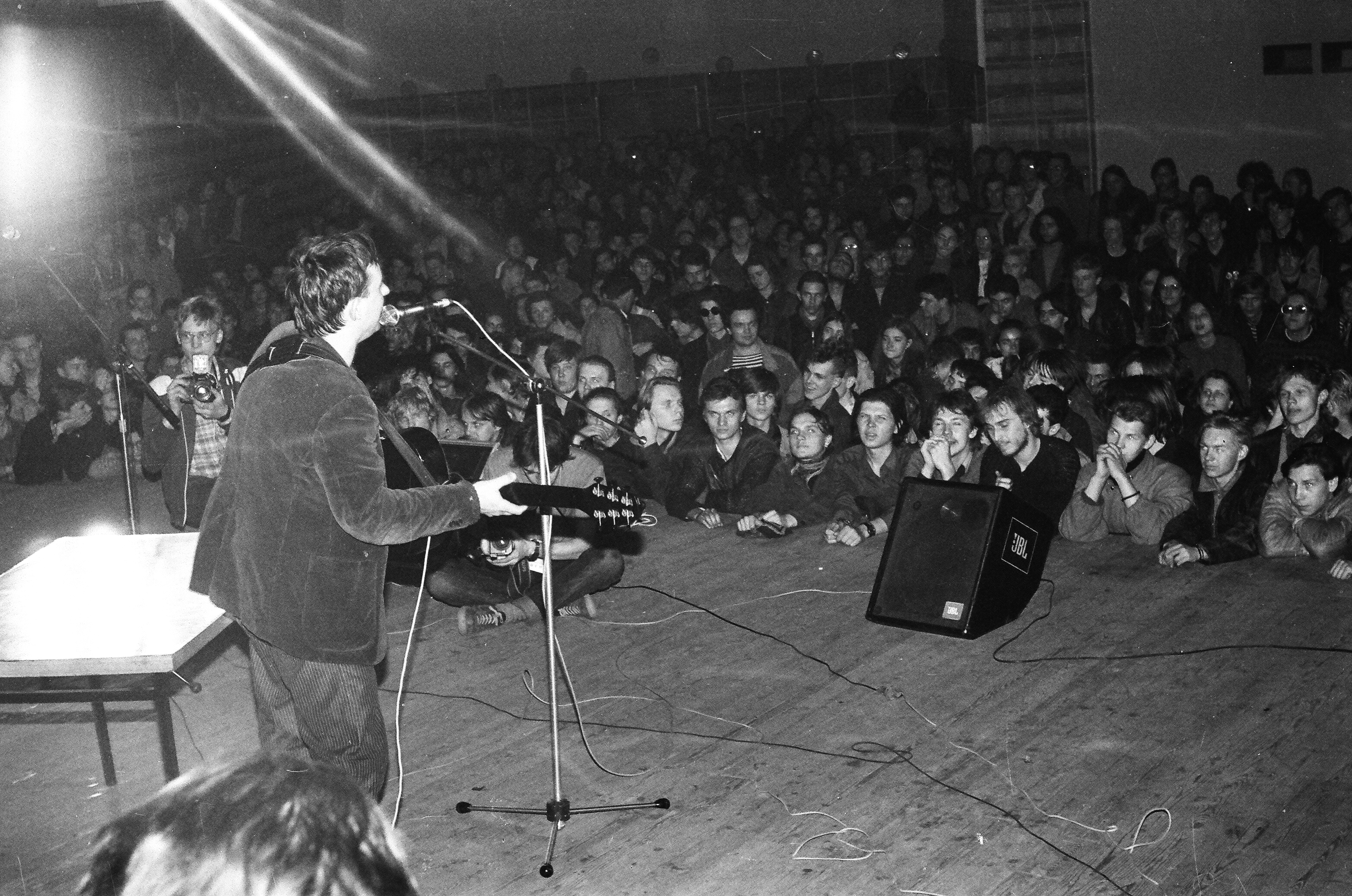
- Instruktsiya po Vizhivaniyu performing on the "Indyuki" festival in 1991

Background information
- Origin: Tyumen, USSR (now Russia)
- Genres: Punk rock, Post punk, alternative rock
- Years active: 1985-present
- Label: IPV-Produkt
- Members: Roman Neumoev; Anton Artamonov; Andrei Lychak; Yulia Lozneva; Nikolai Amelchenko
- Past members: Miroslav Nemirov; Igor Zhevtun; German Bezrukov; Dmitry Shevchuk; Arkady Kuznetsov; Evgeny Kuznetsov
- Website: http://www.neumoev.ru/

Instruktsiya po Vyzhivaniyu (Russian: Инструкция по выживанию, lit. 'Instructions for Survival') is a Russian rock band. It was formed in Tyumen in 1985 by poet Miroslav Nemirov. After a series of events, Roman Neumoev took over leadership, with whom the band is most associated.

== History ==
The band was formed in 1985 by Miroslav Nemirov, who was then a high school literature teacher in Tyumen. He suggested that Arkady Kuznetsov team up with Igor Zhevtun _{[ru]}, forming a band originally named "The Chuck Berry Rebel Army". In 1986 they recorded their first folk album, named "Instructions for Survival", which was the title of a poem by Nemirov, and would later become the band's name. In 1986, encouraged by Komsomol members, Nemirov wrote a script for a play, the main idea of which was to show "how any good initiative perishes in the murky sea of bourgeois show business", presenting the entire evolution of rock music, from rock 'n' roll to punk. Kuznetsov and Zhevtun wrote about 30 songs for the play. The performance took place on April 12, 1986 in the physical education building of Tyumen State University, after which the band members were accused of propagating fascism and homosexuality, which led to the forced conscription of several members into the army, while Nemirov was fired and sent to Nadym.

However, Roman Neumoev, who also took part in the aforementioned play, formed a new band under the same name, and began to play music. They recorded their first album "Nochnoy Bit" (Night Beat) in 1986. In January 1987, Kuznetsov returned to the band. In summer 1987, during a musical festival in Simferopol, Neumoev met Yegor Letov and Yanka Dyagileva. A friendly relationship developed between them, and they collaborated in the one-off joint project Instruktsiya po Oborone (Instruction for Defense, a combination of the names of the two bands). They recorded their most famous album "Konfrontatsiya v Moskve" (Confrontation in Moscow) in 1988. After several performances, they disbanded in 1989, as Neumoev converted to Orthodox Christianity, and began taking part in commercial activities. According to Yegor Letov in 1990, Neumoev permitted him to "do whatever he wanted" with his uncomposed lyrics and songs during a telephone conversation (however, Neumoev denied this after his breakup with Letov in the late 1990s). This led to the album Instruktsiya po vyzhivaniyu by Grazhdanskaya Oborona, released in 1990.

=== 1990s to present ===
In 1991, after an unsuccessful commercial experience, Neumoev reassembled the band, and recorded several albums, including the two demos "Pamyat" (Memory, dedicated to Yanka) and "Vnimanie" (Attention), and the duology of "Smertnoe" (Mortal) and "Armiya Belogo Sveta" (Army of the White Light). The genres of these albums are closer to gothic rock and post-punk, and they explored themes of Orthodox Christianity, monarchism, death as a key to revealing the truth of life, as well as love and religion as a salvation from death. The most controversial song from this series, "Ubit Zhida" (Kill a Kike), which changed Nemirov's original line, "kill a cop to collect his gun" to "kill a Jew to buy a gun", was infamously performed at the "Indyuki" rock festival in 1991. However, Neumoev denied the song's association with antisemitism.

In December 1993, Instruktsiya po Vyzhivaniyu performed in Moscow with Grazhdanskaya Oborona under the "Guide to Action" (Russian: Руководство к действию) campaign. Several days later, Neumoev, Letov and Oleg "Manager" Sudakov (with his band "Rodina") announced the organization of the national communism rock movement "Russkiy Proryv" (Russian Breakthrough). As Neumoev states:

Having lived through the terrible defeat of October 1993, along with everyone who cared about Russia's fate, we realized that the country was entering another phase of a national tragedy. The consequence of this tragedy and this defeat would inevitably be a further deterioration of the economic and demographic situation, or, simply put, the further extinction of the Russian nation. Everything that happened in Moscow in the fall of 1993 is a logical historical continuation of the anti-national coup begun by anti-Russian forces back in February 1917. Thus, all the events of October 1993 were understood and recognized by the main instigators of the events described here as an act of resistance by Russian national forces to the internationalist, pro-Western, and ultimately "diabolical interference" of the global forces of Evil in the development of Russian society and the Russian state. And so, considering ourselves part of our people, we understood that a turning point in history had arrived, when any non-participation in the events and processes unfolding in society bordered on a civil crime, a renunciation of one's own people, and therefore, of oneself.

Throughout 1994, the Russkiy Proryv movement performed in Tyumen, Kyiv, Luhansk, Rostov-on-Don, and Moscow. After the concert in Moscow, Neumoev refused to participate further in the movement due to disagreements with the other participants, and in Saint Petersburg the group performed without him.

In the latter half of the 90s, the members of Instruktsiya po Vyzhivaniyu except for Neumoev formed the group Chernozem (Black Soil) and recorded several albums. Neumoev gradually distanced himself from politics, and Instruktsiya po Vyzhivaniyu performed several times in Moscow and Mogilev. From 1998 to 2000 they recorded three albums.

In 2001, Neumoev, the only remaining member of the original Instruktsiya po Vyzhivaniyu, moved to Pechory, Pskov Oblast, whose main attraction is the Pskov-Pechersky Monastery. In 2005, Neumoev received a blessing from Metropolitan Kirill (the future Patriarch of Moscow and All Russia) to conduct "rock missionary work". Over the next ten years, during missionary trips, he visited more than ten dioceses of the Russian Orthodox Church. The band continued to perform during the 2010s and 2020s.

== Lineup ==
- Roman Neumoev – vocals, guitar, harmonica, keyboards (1986-1989, 1991-2020)
- Evgeny "Jackson" Kokorin – guitar, drums, bass guitar (1987-1989, 1991-2000, 2008, 2012, 2018, 2019, 2020)
- Alexander Andryushkin – drums, guitar, piano (1993-1994, 2007-2008, 2012, 2014, 2017-2020)
- Miroslav Nemirov – ideologist, vocalist (1985—1986)
- Arkady Kuznetsov – bass, guitar, vocals (1985-1986, 1987-1989, 1991-2000, 2004, 2006-2009, 2012, 2014, 2017-2019 )
- Igor "Jeff" Zhevtun – guitar, bass guitar, vocals (1985-1986, 1988, 1989, 1994, 1998, 1999, 2008, 2010)
- Evgeny "Jack" Kuznetsov – drums (1986, 1986-1987, 1988-1989, 1991-1993, 1994-2000, 2006, 2008-2009)
- Igor Gulyaev – guitar (1993-1999)
- Andrey "Mango" Shrub – drums, vocals (1998)
- Nikolai Sosnovkin – violin (1998)
- Roman Lyzhin – guitar (1998-2000)
- Alexandra Beloguzova – violin (1998-2000)
- Marina Kharkina – saxophone (1998-2000)
- Alexander Izotov – piano (1998-2000)
- Maxim Sharkov – keyboards (1998-2000)
- Alexander Minin — drums (1998–2000)
- Lyubov Karpenko – voice (1998-2000)
- Timur – guitar (1999)
- Nikolay Omelchenko — guitar, bass guitar (2002—2014)
- Anton Artamonov – guitar (2002-2014)
- N. Kozlov – bass guitar (2002)
- Alexander Kuzmin – drums (2002)
- Sergey Kucheryavy — guitar, drums (2004)
- Dmitry Bibikov — guitar, bass guitar (2004—2014)†
- Alexander Grushnev — drums (2004)
- Alexey Razhdaev – guitar (2008, 2009, 2012, 2017)
- Yulia "Chertoka" Lozneva — bass guitar (2010–2014)
- Anton Vorobyov – drums (2010–2012)
- Andriy Lychak — drums (2010–2015)
- Roman Karetnikov – bass guitar (2017)
- Irina Lapteva – keyboards (2017)
- Evgeniy Poznyakov – drums (2017)
- Alexander Vladykin — keyboards (2019)

== Discography ==
=== Studio Albums ===
1. 1986 – Instruktsiya po vyzhivaniyu (the only copy of the recording was confiscated by the KGB)
2. 1986 – Nochnoy Bit
3. 1988 – Konfrontatsiya v Moskve
4. 1991 – Pamyat' (demo)
5. 1991 – Vnimanie (demo)
6. 1992 – Smertnoe
7. 1992 – Armiya belogo sveta
8. 1994 – Religiya serdtsa
9. 1998 – Zvyozdnoe nebo
10. 1999 – Shchyotochki
11. 2000 – Za chistoe nebo nad golovoy
12. 2002 – Pechersky venok
13. 2003 – Rex
14. 2004 – Slava lyubvi
15. 2008 – Solnechnyy krest
16. 2008 – Zvyozdy ne umirayut
17. 2014 – Armageddon pozadi!
