= Hor Music =

Russian label, an independent music publishing house

HOR Music
- Founded: 1998
- Status: Inactive
- Genre: Russian rock, punk rock, jazz, reggae

Hor Music (Hor Records or simply HOR, Russian: ХОР Мьюзик) is a Russian independent record label specializing in independent music (mainly on Russian rock music, including Yegor Letov's works).

== Activity ==
Hor Music issued and reissued, in particular, Grazhdanskaya Oborona and other projects of Yegor Letov, Yanka, the Chorniy Lukich, Adaptatsiya, Nozh Dlya Frau Müller, ZGA bands, the projects of Sergey Letov. According to their own information, the label's main musical genres and styles are rock, punk, jazz, reggae, avant-garde music, classical, ethnic music.

HOR also distributed several albums by other labels, which include Moroz Records, UR-REALIST, Wyrgorod and Otdeleniye "VYHOD".

Label was owned by Evgeny Kolesov, the former director of the Grazhdanskaya Oborona band. By the time, the almost complete discography of Grazhdanskaya Oborona was reissued on audio cassettes and CDs.

In 1999, Alexander "Ales" Valedinsky came to work for the label. In 2001, he creates the "Wyrgorod" label as a subsidiary of HOR. Wyrgorod later became an independent company.

The last releases of HOR Music were released in 2003. For some time (at least two years) the company existed only as a distributor of audio products. The last announcement from the label is from 2008. Currently, there is no publishing or business activity under this name.
