= Vadim Kuzmin =

Vadim Kuzmin may refer to:

- Vadim Kuzmin (musician)
- Vadim Kuzmin (physicist)
