= Sto let odinochestva =

Studio album by Egor i Opizdenevshie
- Released: 1993
- Recorded: January 1991 - July 1992
- Studios: GrOb Studios, Omsk
- Genres: Psychedelic rock, post-punk, experimental rock, noise rock, garage rock
- Length: 77:18
- Labels: GrOb/Zolotaja Dolina (original LP issue); BSA (original CD issue); XOP/Moroz (1999 CD reissue); Misteria Zvuka (2007 CD reissue); Wyrgorod (2014 CD reissue)
- Producer: Yegor Letov

Egor i Opizdenevshie chronology
Pryg-skok (1990)	Sto let odinochestva (1993)	Psychodelia Tomorrow (2002)

Sto let odinochestva (Russian: Сто лет одиночества, lit. '100 Years of Solitude') is the second album by Russian psychedelic rock band Egor i Opizdenevshie. It was released in 1993 by Zolotaja Dolina.

Yegor Letov stated the track "Ophelia" was one of his favourite songs. In 2008, after Letov died, his brother Sergei said that the song was written about Yanka Dyagileva. The track "Peredozirovka" was written in 1991 after the death of the younger Letov's cat, who had lived for 11 years. Cats are a recurring motif throughout Letov's work. "Tuman" was previously featured in 1990 on Kommunizm's 14th and final album Khronika pikiruyushchego bombardirovshchika. Reversed and instrumental versions of the track appear on their 13th album Trinadtsat, also released in 1990.

Shortly after the album's release, the band started work on a third album, but they halted work on it, changing their name back to Grazhdanskaya Oborona and beginning to play live. The album would not be released until 2001.

== Track listing ==
No.	Title	Writer(s)	Length
1.	"Свобода (Freedom)"	Егор Летов	2:57
2.	"Евангелие (Gospel)"	Егор Летов	2:56
3.	"Глина научит (The clay will teach you)"	Егор Летов	4:39
4.	"Дрызг и брызг (Splish and Splash)"	Егор Летов, Кузьма Рябинов	1:56
5.	"Вечная весна (Eternal spring)"	Егор Летов, Игорь Жевтун, Кузьма Рябинов	6:08
6.	"Привыкать (Getting used to it)"	Егор Летов	3:34
7.	"Зерно на мельницу (Wheat on a windmill)"	Егор Летов	2:47
8.	"Пуля виноватого найдёт (A bullet will find the guilty one)"	Егор Летов	2:59
9.	"Зря вы это всё (You’re doing all this in vain)"	Егор Летов, Кузьма Рябинов	7:45
10.	"Офелия (Ophelia)"	Егор Летов	4:47
11.	"Передозировка (Overdose)"	Егор Летов	2:12
12.	"Простор открыт (The world is vast)"	Егор Летов	4:29
13.	"Будьте здоровы (живите богато) (Bless you (and live luxuriously))"	Егор Летов, Кузьма Рябинов	2:18
14.	"Как-то утром на рассвете (Once upon a time at dawn)"	Егор Летов, Кузьма Рябинов	0:12
15.	"Tuman"	Александр Колкер, Ким Рыжов	3:11
16.	"В начале было слово (In the beginning was the word)"	Егор Летов, Кузьма Рябинов, Александр Рожков	3:20
17.	"Семь шагов за горизонт (Часть 1) (Seven steps beyond the horizon (part 1))"	Егор Летов	5:23
18.	"Семь шагов за горизонт (Часть 2) (Seven steps beyond the horizon (part 2))"	Егор Летов, Кузьма Рябинов	2:55
19.	"Следы на снегу (Footprints in snow)"	Егор Летов	2:21
20.	"Поживём-увидим (We'll live to see it)"	Егор Летов	1:43
21.	"Сто лет одиночества (One hundred years of solitude)"	Егор Летов	2:20
22.	"Об отшествии преподобнаго в пустыню от славы человеческия (About a blessed one's departure into the desert away from worldly fame)"	Егор Летов, Кузьма Рябинов	4:49

== Legacy ==
In 1995, the album won the "Bronzovy volchok" (Russian: Бронзовый волчок, lit. 'Bronze Top') award for best cover art. Letov was not present at the ceremony.

When Misteria Zvuka reissued the album in 2007, Letov decided to replace some tracks with versions he thought sounded better. The versions as originally released were included as bonus tracks on Pryg-skok. These versions were also carried over to the 2014 reissue on Wyrgorod.
