= Alexander Andryushkin =

Soviet drummer

Alexander Andryushkin (born c. 1972 in Tyumen, Siberia, Soviet Union) is a drummer. His father was a violinist and a conductor in a symphony orchestra. He is influenced by Deep Purple, Sweetwater, Led Zeppelin, and Pink Floyd. From 1994 to 2005, he played drums in Yegor Letov's band Grazhdanskaya Oborona. He recorded the album Dolgaya Schastlivaya Zhizn with the group and toured extensively with them in Russia, Ukraine, the United States, and Kazakhstan. With the group, he played in front of 19,000 fans in Moscow. He was replaced by Pavel Peretolchin in 2005.
