= Pryg-skok =

Pryg-skok: detskiye pesenki

Studio album by Yegor i Opizdenevshiye
- Released: 1990 (Samizdat); 1992, 2014, 2021 (Vinyl); 1993, 1994, 2000, 2005, 2014 (CD)
- Recorded: May—July 1990
- Studios: GrOb studio, Omsk
- Genres: Psychedelic rock, Folk rock, experimental rock, lo-fi
- Language: Russian
- Labels: GrOb Records, Zolotaya Dolina (1992), BSA Records (1993, 1994), Hor (2000), Misteria Zvuka (2005), Miru-Mir (2014), Wyrgorod (2014, 2021)

Yegor i Opizdenevshiye chronology
Pryg-skok: detskiye pesenki (1990)	Sto let odinochestva (1993)

Pryg-skok: detskiye pesenki (Russian: Прыг-скок: детские песенки, lit. 'Jump hop: songs for kids') is the debut studio album by the Soviet-Russian psychedelic band "Egor & Opizdenevshiye". It was recorded in 1990 by Konstantin Ryabinov and Egor Letov. Officially released in 1992 by "Zolotaya Dolina" on Vinyl Record. The album is dedicated to Letov's deceased friend Yevgenii Lischenko and the performance of the Cameroon national football team in the 1990 FIFA World Cup.

== Background ==
In the summer of 1990, after Grazhdanskaya Oborona broke up, Egor Letov went hiking in the forests and rocks of the Urals. While hiking, he was bitten by a tick and contracted encephalitis. Upon his return to Omsk, he had a high fever and was forced to stay in bed for a month. His doctor had told him that he had a high chance of either becoming paralysed or going insane, neither of which happened. To pass the time, Letov started watching football matches on TV and became a fan of the Cameroon national football team who he dedicated the album to.

=== Releases ===
Initially, the album was distributed illegally on a reel-to-reel release because of the Soviet Union's strict rules on music distribution, which Letov's music did not fit. In 1992, after the dissolution of the Soviet Union it became possible to release the album on vinyl; he signed a contract with "Zolotaya Dolina", which also released a few of his other albums. In 1993 and 1994, the album was released on CD for the first time by BSA Records.

In 2000, Hor label started releasing all Letov's albums on CDs; the same year, this album was also released. Shortly after, in 2005, the album was reissued by Misteria Zvuka; the reissue contained bonus songs, which were outtakes from the other album "Sto let odinochestva". In 2014, the album was reissued on CD for the second time by Wyrgorod.

In 2014, the album was reissued on Vinyl by "Miru-mir". in 2021, Wyrgorod reissued this album on Vinyl once again.

== Tracklist and Credits ==
=== GrOb Records reel-to-reel "release" (1990) ===
All tracks are written by Egor Letov except track 5 by Roman Neumoev.

No.	Title	Transliterated title	Length
1.	"Про дурачка(About a fool)"	Pro durachka	4:26
2.	"Песенка о святости, мыше и камыше(The song about holiness,a mouse and seaweed)"	Pesenka o svyatosti, myshe i kamyshe	2:31
3.	"Отряд не заметил потери бойца(The squad didn’t notice a soldier’s loss)"	Otryad ne zametil poteri boitsa	2:24
4.	"Толчки и червячки(Pushes and worms)"	Tolchki i chervyachki	1:45
5.	"Красный смех(Red laugh)"	Krasnyi smekh	3:17
6.	"Ночь(Night)"	Noch	0:56
7.	"Маленький принц возвращался домой(The little prince was coming back home)"	Malenkii prints vozvraschalsya domoi	3:14
8.	"Ещё раз про дурачка(About the fool again)"	Esche raz pro durachka	0:18
9.	"Про мишутку (песенка для Янки)(About a bear(song for Yanka))"	Pro mishutku (pesenka dlya Yanki)	2:34
10.	"Когда я умер(When I died)"	Kogda ya umer	0:06
11.	"Иваново детство(Ivan’s childhood)"	Ivanovo detstvo	3:35
12.	"Прыг-скок(Hop-frog)"	Pryg-skok	10:23

=== Zolotaja Dolina LP (1992) and BSA/Stalker-2 CD (1993) ===
All tracks are written by Egor Letov except tracks 5 and 10 by Roman Neumoev.

No.	Title	Transliterated title	Length
1.	"Про дурачка"	Pro durachka	4:26
2.	"Песенка о святости, мыше и камыше"	Pesenka o svyatosti, myshe i kamyshe	2:31
3.	"Отряд не заметил потери бойка"	Otryad ne zametil poteri boitsa	2:24
4.	"Толчки и червячки"	Tolchki i chervyachki	1:45
5.	"Красный смех"	Krasnyi smekh	3:17
6.	"Ночь"	Noch	0:56
7.	"Маленький принц возвращался домой"	Malenkii prints vozvraschalsya domoi	3:14
8.	"Ещё раз про дурачка"	Esche raz pro durachka	0:18
9.	"Про мишутку (песенка для Янки)"	Pro mishutku (pesenka dlya Yanki)	2:34
10.	"Про малиновую девочку"	Pro malinovuyu devochku	3:11
11.	"Когда я умер"	Kogda ya umer	0:06
12.	"Иваново детство"	Ivanovo detstvo	3:35
13.	"Прыг-скок"	Pryg-skok	10:23

=== BSA CD (1994) and XOP/Moroz CD and cassette (1999) ===
All tracks are written by Egor Letov except tracks 5 and 8 by Roman Neumoev.

No.	Title	Transliterated title	Length
1.	"Про дурачка"	Pro durachka	4:26
2.	"Песенка о святости, мыше и камыше"	Pesenka o svyatosti, myshe i kamyshe	2:31
3.	"Отряд не заметил потери бойка"	Otryad ne zametil poteri boitsa	2:24
4.	"Толчки и червячки"	Tolchki i chervyachki	1:45
5.	"Красный смех"	Krasnyi smekh	3:17
6.	"Ночь"	Noch	0:56
7.	"Маленький принц возвращался домой"	Malenkii prints vozvraschalsya domoi	3:14
8.	"Про малиновую девочку"	Pro malinovuyu devochku	3:11
9.	"Ещё раз про дурачка"	Esche raz pro durachka	0:18
10.	"Про мишутку (песенка для Янки)"	Pro mishutku (pesenka dlya Yanki)	2:34
11.	"Когда я умер"	Kogda ya umer	0:06
12.	"Про голографических Соловьев"	Pro golograficheskikh Solovev	1:35
13.	"Про окурок и курок"	Pro okurok i kurok	2:44
14.	"Иваново детство"	Ivanovo detstvo	3:35
15.	"Прыг-скок"	Pryg-skok	10:23

=== Misteriya Zvuka CD (2005), Mirumir LP (2014) and Wyrgorod CD (2014) ===
All tracks are written by Egor Letov.

No.	Title	Transliterated title	Length
1.	"Про дурачка"	Pro durachka	4:26
2.	"Песенка о святости, мыше и камыше"	Pesenka o svyatosti, myshe i kamyshe	2:31
3.	"Отряд не заметил потери бойка"	Otryad ne zametil poteri boitsa	2:24
4.	"Про червячков"	Pro chervyachkov	1:45
5.	"Ночь"	Noch	0:56
6.	"Маленький принц возвращался домой"	Malenkii prints vozvraschalsya domoi	3:14
7.	"Ещё раз про дурачка"	Esche raz pro durachka	0:18
8.	"Про мишутку (песенка для Янки)"	Pro mishutku (pesenka dlya Yanki)	2:34
9.	"Когда я умер"	Kogda ya umer	0:06
10.	"Жека уже в Гамбурге"	Zheka uzhe v Gamburge	1:35
11.	"Моё описание меня бережёт"	Moe opisanie menya berezhet	0:49
12.	"Про окурок и курок"	Pro okurok i kurok	2:44
13.	"Иваново детство"	Ivanovo detstvo	3:35
14.	"Прыг-скок"	Pryg-skok	10:23

==== Personnel ====
- Egor Letov — vocals, guitars, bass, drums;
- Igor "Jeff" Zhevtun — bass, tuning fork, guitars;
- Konstantin "Kuzya UO" Ryabinov — guitar, tambourine;
- Yulya Sherstobitova — backing vocals.

Remixed and restored April 14–15, 2005: GrOb Studio, Egor Letov, and Natalia Chumakova. Mastering: Natalia Chumakova.
