= Vadim Kuzmin (musician) =

Russian musician (1964–2012)

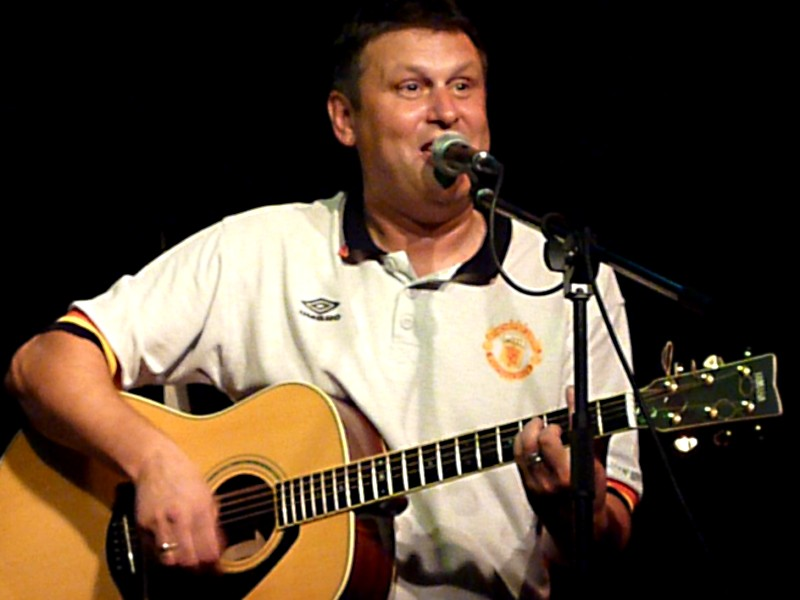
Kuzmin in 2009

Vadim Petrovich Kuzmin (March 19, 1964, Novosibirsk – November 19, 2012, Voronezh) was a Russian musician, the leader of rock band Chyorniy Lukich.

He started his musical activities in 1986 when founded the rock band "Spinki menta". The band became a member of Novosibirsk rock club and participated in the First Novosibirsk Rock Festival. He was in contact with other leaders of the rock movement, Yanka Dyagileva and Yegor Letov. In 1988, he recorded his first albums in Omsk. In 1990, Kuzmin's band became the Band of the Year in Novosibirsk.

From 2006, Kuzmin lived with his family in Voronezh.
