= Zachem snyatsya sny? =

Studio album by Grazhdanskaya Oborona
- Released: 9 May 2007
- Recorded: 28 July–18 September 2006; GrOb-Studio, Omsk, Russia
- Genres: Psychedelic rock, post-punk, shoegaze, garage rock
- Length: 69:52
- Label: Wyrgorod
- Producer: Yegor Letov

Grazhdanskaya Oborona chronology
Reanimatsiya (2005)	Zachem snyatsya sny? (2007)

Zachem snyatsya sny (Russian: Зачем снятся сны?, English: Why Do We Have Dreams?) is the 23rd and final album by the Russian garage band Grazhdanskaya Oborona. It was released on 9 May 2007. The album is dedicated to the memory of Arthur Lee and Syd Barrett.

== History ==
The album is inspired by a bad LSD trip taken by Letov. The album was influenced by Yegor i Opizdenevshiye, whose name appears on the album. In an interview shortly after the release, he stated he had used up all his creative energies and that there would be no more GrOb albums - a statement which would turn out to be true when Letov died.

The song "Nochyu" was originally titled "Pryg-skok II". It was written during the aforementioned LSD trip and included many fragments of Letov's poetry from 1992 to 1994 in the lyrics. The original song was much longer than the final cut. The album was originally issued on CD. The Russian release came in a digipack with a booklet containing full lyrics, while the Ukrainian one came in a standard jewel case with only a four-page booklet containing a picture of the band. The album was reissued in 2012 on vinyl with new dynamic mastering compared to the loud one of the CD.

The title comes from a song written by Robert Rozhdestvensky. The song doesn't appear on this album, however it was recorded in 1993 by Yegor i Opizdenevshiye and in 2000 by Natalia Chumakova.

The album artwork is a famous painting of Noah's Ark by Edward Hicks. The painting was previously used on Bijelo Dugme's Ćiribiribela (1989).

== Critical acclaim ==
Critics praised "Why Do Dreams Occur" for its innovative and transformative qualities, highlighting Egor Letov's journey from turmoil to a brighter, more lyrical expression. In Afisha, Maxim Semelyak referred to the album as being a bird's-eye view on everything.

== Track list ==
All tracks are written by Yegor Letov except 13 by Oleg Lishchenko

Side A
No.	Title	Length
1.	"Слава психонавтам (Slava psikhonavtam) / Heil to Psychonauts"	3:48
2.	"Кто-то другой (Kto-to drugoi) / Anybody another"	2:53
3.	"Фейерверк (Feyerverk) / Fireworks"	3:44
4.	"Значит, ураган (Znachit, uragan) / So, a hurricane"	3:52
5.	"Сияние (Siyanie) / The Shining"	2:31

Side B
No.	Title	Length
6.	"Танец для мёртвых (Tanets dlya myortvykh) / A dance for the dead"	4:09
7.	"Куда мы есть (Kuda my yest) / Which way we are"	3:09
8.	"Упадок (Upadok) / Decline"	0:47
9.	"Где (Gde) / Where"	3:53
10.	"Потрясающий вид из окна (Potryasayushchiy vid iz okna) / A wonderful view from the window"	3:01

Side C
No.	Title	Length
11.	"Калейдоскоп (Kaleydoskop) / Kaleidoscope"	4:40
12.	"К тебе (K tebe) / To You"	3:04
13.	"Я чувствую себя не в своих штанах (Ya chuvstvuyu sebya ne v svoikh shtanakh) / I feel myself out of my pants"	1:45
14.	"Всё это с тобой (Vsyo eto s toboy) / Everything is with you"	4:55
15.	"Резвые (Rezvye) / Vivacious"	2:17

Side D
No.	Title	Length
16.	"Снаружи всех измерений (Snaruzhi vsekh izmereniy) / Outside of all dimensions"	4:53
17.	"Кролики (Kroliki) / Rabbits"	2:28
18.	"Ночью (Nochyu) / At night"	7:29
19.	"Осень (Osen) / The Fall"	4:31
