= Miroslav Nemirov =

Russian poet (1961–2016)

Miroslav Maratovich Nemirov
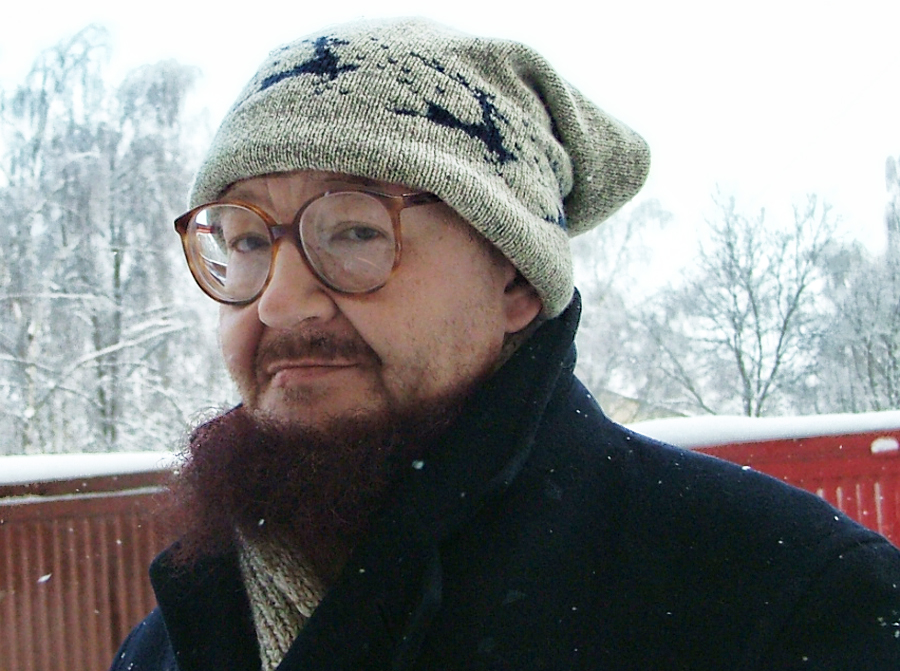
- Nemirov in 2010
- Born: 8 November 1961; Rostov-on-Don, USSR (now Russia)
- Died: 21 February 2016 (aged 54); Moscow, Russia
- Occupations: Poet, author, columnist

Miroslav Maratovich Nemirov (Russian: Мирослав Маратович Немиров; 8 November 1961 – 21 February 2016) was a Russian poet who was associated with the Russian punk rock scene. Born in Rostov-on-Don, he is best known as the founder of the Siberian punk band Instruktsiya po Vyzhivaniyu in 1985 in Tyumen, and is also known as the author of the Great Tyumen Encyclopaedia (Russian: Большая Тюменская Энциклопедия). He was also a regular columnist of Russian Journal between 2000 and 2003. He also collaborated with Grazhdanskaya Oborona.

Nemirov was born in Rostov-on-Don in 1961 and moved to Tyumen in the beginning of the 1980s, where he studied languages at the Tyumen State University. He was one of the founders of the Tyumen rock club. In the 1990s he returned to Rostov-on-Don where he became one of the founders of the art group Art or Death (Russian: Искусство или смерть”). One of the members of the group was Avdey Ter-Oganyan, who left for Prague in 1989, and Nemirov wrote a book about the art of Ter-Oganyan. Later he moved to Moscow. In 1999 he organized the Association of Masters of Arts OsumBez (Russian: Осумасшедшевшие Безумцы, Osumasshedshevshiye Bezumtsy). The partnership consisted of poets, photographers and musicians. Among other members of the group there were Vsevolod Yemelin, Vladimir Bogomyakov, and German Lukomnikov.

Nemirov died of cancer in Moscow in 2016.

Much of the lyrics of Nemirov contain obscene words and expressions and could not be published or put online according to Russian laws. The compendium of Nemirov's essays in Russian Journal is considered as an encyclopedia of Russian rock music. Most of his poems and essays remain unpublished.
