= Optimizm =

Studio album by Grazhdanskaya Oborona
- Released: 1985, 1988
- Recorded: Summer 1985 / 12–22 January 1988
- Studio: GrOb Studio
- Genre: Post-punk; noise rock; garage punk; garage rock; lo-fi music
- Length: 31:00 (1988 original); 46:01 (2006 CD reissue)
- Label: GrOb; XOP/Moroz (1996 CD/MC reissue); Misteriya Zvuka (2006 expanded CD reissue)
- Producer: Yegor Letov

Grazhdanskaya Oborona chronology
Poganaya molodyozh' (1985)	Optimizm (1985)	Myshelovka (1987)

Optimizm (Russian: Оптимизм, Optimism) is the second studio album by Soviet/Russian punk band Grazhdanskaya Oborona. The album was released in 1985 and was recorded concurrently with its follow-up Poganaya molodyozh'.

The original versions of Poganaya molodezh and Optimizm were recorded in 1984 with Yegor Letov and Konstantin Ryabinov (Kuzya UO, Кузя УО) and intended to be a Posev album. According to Letov, the two albums represented two parts of one big release and published together on a single tape. This tape was produced under the title "Grazhdanskaya Oborona" or "GO-85". The album was recorded in 1984/1985, but was re-recorded in 1988 by Letov and Kuzya UO. Participants in the recording of the album in 1985 was Andrey Babenko (Boss), Oleg Ivanovsky and Valery Rozhkov, who played the flute in the song "Optimizm".

The album is lighter and more lyrical in comparison with the debut album and made in the genre of post-punk and garage rock. The songs "Sobaka", "Na nashikh glazakh" and "Optimizm" were played in the genre reggae and folk. Songs of this album were composed by Letov and Kuzya Uo back in the band «Posev» in 1983. Subsequently, these songs were re-recorded and included in the compilation of Grazhdansakaya Oborona "Posev" in 1989.

The album had no cover until the 1999 release on XOP, because it was originally distributed via magnitizdat.

== Track listing ==
No.	Title	Writer(s)	Length
1.	"Ya bespolezen ("I’m useless")"	Yegor Letov, Oleg Ivanovsky, Kuzya UO	3:14
2.	"Ya blyuyu na vashi dela ("I don’t care about what you do")"	Letov, Andrey Babenko, Kuzya UO	2:11
3.	"Na nashikh glazakh ("Before our eyes")"	Letov	3:05
4.	"Klenoviy list ("Maple leaf")"	Letov	2:08
5.	"Ey, babishcha blevani ("Hey, hag, puke!")"	Letov, Ivanovsky, UO	2:57
6.	"Kto ischet smisl ("Who searches for sense")"	Letov	3:30
7.	"Sobaka ("Dog")"	Kuzya UO	3:55
8.	"Eto ne ya ("That's not me")"	Letov, UO	2:04
9.	"Optimizm ("Optimism")"	Letov	2:06
10.	"Detsky doktor skazal: "Nishtyak" ("Pediatrician said: Cool")"	Letov, UO	4:12
11.	"Ne nado ("No need")"	Letov, UO	0:36

== Personnel ==
- Yegor Letov – vocals, guitars, bass guitar, drums, production
- Konstantin Ryabinov (Kuzya UO) – vocals, guitars, bass guitar
- Valery Rozhkov – flute («Optimizm»)
