= Vera Matveyeva =

Russian poet and musician (1945–1976)

Vera Ilyinichna Matveyeva (Russian: Вера Ильинична Матвеева; 1945–1976) was a Russian poet and singer-songwriter. Her first album came out two years after her death.

== Biography ==
Matveyeva was born in Kuybyshevka-Vostochnaya in the east of Russia on 23 October 1945. Her father was a military officer, and the family moved along the country, settling in the 1950s in Khimki near Moscow. She graduated from high school in 1963, starting occasional jobs and travelling around Russia.

In 1965, Matveyeva enrolled in Moscow Institute of Construction Engineering, graduating in 1970. She started to write songs, both music and lyrics, in the 1960s. She also performed them, playing guitar and singing. Most of her records date between 1965 and 1973. At the time, the author song was popular in the Soviet Union. Matveyeva was close to Viktor Luferov, Vladimir Berezhkov, and Alexander Mirzayan, they often performed together.

In 1970, she was diagnosed with brain cancer, from which she died in 1976 in Khimki.

It was noted that since she has written many of her songs when she was already terminally ill, they are different from the mainstream Soviet author song and are characterized by a greater openness. No records of Matveyeva were released in her lifetime. The first album was out in 1978.
