= 1996 Russian elections =

51 heads of federal subjects 29 regional parliaments

The 1996 Russian elections were held from 25 February to 29 December. President Boris Yeltsin won re-election on 3 July, defeating Gennady Zyuganov.

== Presidential election ==
The presidential elections were held on 16 June 1996, with a second round on 3 July.

Candidate	Party	First round		Second round	
Candidate	Party	Votes	%	Votes	%
Boris Yeltsin	Independent	26,665,495	35.79	40,203,948	54.40
Gennady Zyuganov	Communist Party	24,211,686	32.49	30,102,288	40.73
Alexander Lebed	Congress of Russian Communities	10,974,736	14.73		
Grigory Yavlinsky	Yabloko	5,550,752	7.45		
Vladimir Zhirinovsky	Liberal Democratic Party	4,311,479	5.79		
Svyatoslav Fyodorov	Party of Workers' Self-Government	699,158	0.94		
Mikhail Gorbachev	Independent	386,069	0.52		
Martin Shakkum	Socialist People's Party	277,068	0.37		
Yury Vlasov	Independent	151,282	0.20		
Vladimir Bryntsalov	Russian Socialist Party	123,065	0.17		
Aman Tuleyev (Note: Withdrew his candidacy before the election but received 308 votes during the early voting (up to the withdrawal of the candidature), which were credited as valid.)	Independent	308	0.00		
Against all		1,163,921	1.56	3,604,462	4.88
Total		74,515,019	100.00	73,910,698	100.00
Valid votes		74,515,019	98.58	73,910,698	98.95
Invalid/blank votes		1,072,120	1.42	780,592	1.05
Total votes		75,587,139	100.00	74,691,290	100.00
Registered voters/turnout		108,495,023	69.67	108,589,050	68.78
Source: Nohlen & Stöver, Colton, CEC

== By-elections to the State Duma ==
A by-election took place on 8 December 1996 in the Makhachkala constituency of Dagestan to fill the seat of former member Gamid Gamidov, who was appointed finance minister of Dagestan in April 1996 and was later assassinated on 20 August 1996. Nadirshakh Khachilayev, leader of the Union of Muslims of Russia, won the constituency.

== Gubernatorial elections ==
The three offices of the heads of federal subjects elected on 12 June 1991, were up for election in first half of the year. President Mintimer Shaymiyev of Tatarstan and Mayor Yury Luzhkov of Moscow re-elected successfully, while Saint Petersburg Mayor Anatoly Sobchak lost to his former deputy Vladimir Yakovlev in runoff.

After Yeltsin secured his second term, the gubernatorial campaign started in more than a half of Russia's federal subjects. In 20 of them heads of administrations appointed by president were defeated by candidates of the People's Patriotic Union of Russia, a left-leaning coalition founded by former presidential candidate Gennady Zyuganov.

== Regional legislative elections ==
Legislature	Date	Seats	Voting system
National Assembly of Chechnya	16 June		
Supreme Council of Khakassia	22 December	75	Single Member District Plurality
State Assembly of Mari El	6 October	67	Single Member District Plurality
Altai Krai Legislative Assembly	31 March	50	
Arkhangelsk Oblast Assembly of Deputies	16 June	39	Single Member District Plurality
Bryansk Oblast Duma	8 December	50	Single Member District Plurality
Legislative Assembly of Chelyabinsk Oblast	22 December	41	
Chita Oblast Duma	27 October	39	
Legislative Assembly of Irkutsk Oblast	16 June	45	Single Member District Plurality
Ivanovo Oblast Duma	1 December	35	
Kaliningrad Oblast Duma	6 October	32	27 SMD + 5 party list
Legislative Assembly of Kaluga Oblast	25 August	40	
Legislative Assembly of Kemerovo Oblast	29 December	21	
Kostroma Oblast Duma	8 December	21	
Kurgan Oblast Duma	24 November	33	
Sakhalin Oblast Duma	20 October	27	
Legislative Assembly of Sverdlovsk Oblast (bicameral: House of Representatives and Sverdlovsk Oblast Duma)	14 April	21 of 21 (House), 14 of 28 (Duma)	Single Member District Plurality (House), Proportional representation (Duma)
Tula Oblast Duma	29 September	48	
Vladimir Oblast Duma	8 December	37	
Legislative Assembly of Vologda Oblast	25 February	15 of 30	
State Duma of Yaroslavl Oblast	25 February	50	Single Member District Plurality
Duma of Agin-Buryat Autonomous Okrug	27 October	15	
Duma of Chukotka Autonomous Okrug	22 December	15	
Legislative Assembly of Evenk Autonomous Okrug	22 December	23	Single Member District Plurality
Duma of Khanty–Mansi Autonomous Okrug	27 October	23	
Duma of Koryak Autonomous Okrug	17 November	12	8 SMD + 4 party list
Assembly of Deputies of the Nenets Autonomous Okrug	1 December	15	
Duma of Ust-Orda Buryat Autonomous Okrug	1 December	19	
Legislative Assembly of Yamalo-Nenets Autonomous Okrug	21 April	21	

== Sources ==
- "Органы представительной власти субъектов Российской Федерации / Общий список регионов" [Legislatures of the subjects of the Russian Federation / Full list of regions]. panorama.ru (in Russian).
