= Yanka Dyagileva =

Russian poet and singer-songwriter (1966–1991)

- Yanka Dyagileva in Zelenograd. 1 September 1990

Background information
- Born: Yana Stanislavovna Dyagileva; 4 September 1966; Novosibirsk, USSR
- Died: 9 May 1991 (aged 24) near Novosibirsk, USSR
- Genres: Post-punk, psychedelic rock, folk punk, underground, punk rock
- Occupations: Musician, songwriter
- Instruments: Singing, guitar, bass guitar, glockenspiel
- Years active: 1987–1991
- Formerly of: Grazhdanskaya Oborona, Kommunizm, Velikiye Oktyabri, Instrukcija po oborone

Yana Stanislavovna "Yanka" Dyagileva (Russian: Яна Станиславовна Дягилева; 4 September 1966 – c. 9 May 1991) was a Russian poet and singer-songwriter, and one of the most popular figures of her time in the Siberian underground music scene. She both played solo and performed with others, including Yegor Letov and bands Grazhdanskaya Oborona and Velikie Oktyabri ("Great Octobers"). Yanka was greatly influenced by her friends Letov and Alexander Bashlachev. Her songs explored themes of desperation and depression, punk-style nihilism, and folk-like lamentations. Her death in 1991 has been considered as a symbolic end to the Siberian punk scene.

== Biography ==
Yanka (born Yana) Dyagileva was born on 4 September 1966, in Novosibirsk, USSR to Stanislav Dyagilev, an engineer, and Galina Dyagileva. She was of Russian, Ukrainian and Czech origin. In 1973 she attended public school and studied piano for a year at a music school before quitting. This sparked her interest in the guitar. While still in school, Yanka started writing poems (which have been lost) and performing, singing and playing guitar in school talent shows. In 1984 she entered the Novosibirsk Institute of Water Transport Engineers, but dropped out in her sophomore year. During this period she performed with the political band AMIGO. The earliest of Yanka's poetry that has survived is from 1985. In December 1985 she traveled to Leningrad, where she may have met Alexander Bashlachev. In October 1986, Yanka's mother died of cancer.

In April 1987, Yanka met Yegor Letov, and was romantically involved with him. She performed two songs, "Pechal Moya Svetla" (My Sorrow is Luminous) and "Kak Zhit'" (How to Live), in the five album recordings of Grazhdanskaya Oborona in 1987, which at that time only consisted of Yegor Letov. In summer 1987, due to renewed political repression by the authorities, Letov was forced to leave his home city of Omsk and hitchhike around the country for six months. Yanka accompanied him throughout the entire trip. In January 1988, Yanka recorded her first album "Ne Polozheno" (Not Allowed).

From 1988 to 1990, Yanka toured around the country with the electric band Velikie Oktyabri (Great Octobers). The band was organized by her and Letov, and contained musicians from Instruktsiya po Vyzhivaniyu and Grazhdanskaya Oborona. Her first performance before a large audience took place on 24 June 1988, at the 1st Tyumen punk festival. She also recorded the bootleg album To the Déclassé Elements (Russian: Деклассированным элементам) there. In 1989, Yanka performed in Leningrad for the first time as part of a concert produced by Sergei Firsov, who became Yanka and Grazhdanskaya Oborona's first producer. Yanka's acoustic album Sold! (Russian: Продано!) was recorded in Firsov's apartment. Yanka recorded the two albums "Angenodiya" (Anhedonia) and "Domoy!" (Go Home!) in 1989, which features electrical instruments performed by members of Grazhdanskaya Oborona, and noise rock elements added by Letov, reminiscent of the four albums by Grazhdanskaya Oborona in the same year.

In 1990, Yanka gradually sank into depression due to various circumstances. In late 1990, Letov stopped his cooperation with Yanka. Yanka recorded her last songs in September 1990 in Novosibirsk, including "Legs [Feet] Above the Ground" (Russian: Выше ноги от земли), "Five-Kopeck Coin in the Road" (Russian: На дороге пятак), "About Little Devils" (Russian: Про чёртиков), and "Water Will Come" (Russian: Придёт вода). These songs are mixed by Letov in June 1991, and included in the posthumously released album "Styd i Sram" (Shame and Disgrace). Yanka's final known public appearances took place in November 1990 in Irkutsk, Angarsk, and Leningrad. Her final live concert recording took place in Irkutsk on 10 November 1990. Several more performances were planned for February 1991 in Irkutsk; it is unknown if they ever took place.

During her lifetime, Yanka was virtually unnoticed by the official media. She disliked giving interviews, declined Melodiya's offer to release a disc (she destroyed the recording of a concert in Cherepovets in January 1990 when Melodiya required it from her for an official release), and television never produced any video footage of her. Yanka never sought popularity or contributed to the promotion of her name in any way.

— Just to talk, please. But there shouldn’t be a single line in the newspaper.

— But why? Maybe you don’t need it, but others do?

— Those who need it will figure out who I am and why.

9 May 1991 is accepted as her official date of death. That evening she left her family's countryside home outside Novosibirsk and did not return. Her body was found by a fisherman on 17 May in the Inya River. She was presumed to have drowned near Novorodnikovo Train Station and been carried 40 kilometers by the current. On 19 May, she was buried in Novosibirsk's Zayeltsovskoye Cemetery. More than a thousand people attended the funeral.

Following Yanka's death, many different theories emerged about what happened. The investigation never definitively determined whether it was an accident or suicide. Officials accepted the theory that she drowned as a result of an accident; according to the forensic examination, no violent injuries were found on the body. Supporters of the suicide theory have put forward various theories about possible motives. It is known that in the winter and spring of 1991, Yanka suffered from depression, which worsened after Letov's latest visit. There is also a theory about murder: in particular, Yegor Letov and Vadim Kuzmin (leader of the band "Black Lukich") did not rule out this possibility in their interviews. According to this version, the back of Yanka's head was fractured, and there was no water in her lungs, which is a sign that death occurred before she fell into the water.

== Memories ==
In the film "Zdorovo i Vechno" (Healthily and Eternally), Oleg Sudakov recalled:

It was Tyumen, '88 or '89. Yanka sings songs, and they just stick in her craw, scenes like, "I'm going wild with every mink hat." Five or six girls are sitting at the edge of the stage, back then, I think, they were wearing that angora "wool", those shaggy sweaters, short skirts, naturally, immaculate. And Yanka is standing there. She's singing all this, and everyone, let's say, the others, like people from a different world, understand that, generally speaking, this is not right. For a girl to behave like that. On the other hand, she was a little plump, a real bear... But she's talking about what they're afraid to admit to themselves. And at that moment, they were just crying. I kind of noticed a few tears in the girls. They understand that they can never be like that. I mean, not like that on stage, but like that in terms of seeing the world. They really want to be like that. But you'll never be like that. But it's incredibly wonderful that she at least showed it and they accepted it in that second.

Yegor Letov's song "Pro Mishutku" (About a teddy bear, written in 1990) was dedicated to Yanka. According to Yegor Letov's brother Sergey Letov, the song "Ophelia" (written in 1991) by the group "Yegor i Opizdenevshiye" in the album "Sto let odinochestva" was a requiem for Yanka.

The album Pamyat (Memory) recorded in 1991 by Instruktsiya po Vyzhivaniyu was dedicated to Yanka after her death.

In 2007, American singer Alina Simone, originally from Kharkiv, recorded a tribute album consisting entirely of cover versions of Yanka Dyagileva's songs, which was released in 2008 under the title "Everyone is Crying Out to Me Beware".

"Nyurkina Pesnya" (Nyurka's song) was written by Yanka Dyagileva for her close friend Anna "Nyuruch" Volkova. In 2009, Anna Volkova, together with her husband Alexander Vladykin (of Kalinov Most), recorded it for the album with the same name.

On February 2, 2022, the Spanish band Egun Beltzak released a tribute album in Basque language. The album includes 14 songs. Work on the album had been ongoing since 2015.

== Discography ==
Reference: https://grob-hroniki.org/music/#yanka

Albums:

- 1988 - Ne polozheno (Not Allowed)
- 1988 - Deklassirovannym elementam (To the Déclassé Elements)
- 1989 - Prodano! (Sold!)
- 1989 - Domoy! (Go Home!)
- 1989 - Angedonia ("Anhedonia")
- 1991 - Styd i Sram (Shame and Disgrace) - There are two variants of this album, one is a bootleg containing four acoustic songs, later included as a bonus in the 2009 release of Domoy!. The other is a compilation with remastering done by Letov; the compilation contains seven songs, mostly electrified (not acoustic).

Compilations:

- 2022 - Krestovyy Nol' (Cross Zero)

Live:

- 1988 - Concert in Kurgan
- 1989 - Concert at MAMI
- 1989 - Krasnogvardeyskaya (Concert in Moscow) - Named after the Moscow Metro station. A.k.a. "Akustika".
- 1989 - Concert in Kharkiv
- 1989 - Concert in Irkutsk
- 1989 - Apartment concert in Kharkiv
- 1989 - Concert at the Zheleznodorozhnik Cultural Center
- 1990 - Concert in Cherepovets
- 1990 (with Grazhdanskaya Oborona) - Concert at MEI
- 1990 (with Yegor Letov) - performance at the concert in memory of Alexander Bashlachev
- 1990 - Performance at the 1st International Festival "Rock Asia"
- 1990 - The last acoustics at Irkutsk

== Bibliography ==
- Е. Летов, Я. Дягилева, К. Рябинов. Русское поле экспериментов, 1994. ISBN 978-5-87787-004-8
- Янка Дягилева. Придёт вода, 1998. ISBN 978-5-87109-063-3
- Янка. Сборник материалов, 2001.
- Янка. Стихи, 2003. ISBN 978-5-94381-113-5
- Янка. Выше ноги от земли, 2018. ISBN 978-5-905623-09-7
