= Yegor i Opizdenevshiye =

Russian psychedelic rock band

Egor & Opizdenevshie
- Origin: Omsk, USSR (now Russia)
- Genres: Psychedelic rock, post-punk, experimental rock, garage rock, noise rock, folk rock
- Years active: 1990–1993
- Labels: GrOb, BSA, XOP/Moroz, Misteriya Zvuka, Wyrgorod
- Past members: Yegor Letov; Kuzya UO; Igor "Jeff" Zhevtun; Aleksandar Rozhkov; Evgeniy "Makhno" P'yanov; Yuliya Sherstobitova; Anna Volkova
- Website: http://www.gr-oborona.ru/

Egor & Opizdenevshie (Russian: Егор и Опизденевшие, lit. 'Yegor and the Fuck-Up's') was a Soviet and Russian psychedelic rock project.

== History ==
The band was formed in 1990 by Yegor Letov and Konstantin "Kuzya UO" Ryabinov, after Letov's main band Grazhdanskaya Oborona broke up. They released three albums in their lifetime.

The first album, Pryg-skok (Jump-hop), was released in 1990, having been recorded from May to June 1990. The album was released on vinyl in 1992, but the band name wasn't mentioned anywhere on the outer sleeve, due to profanity (пизд-) in it. However, a sticker was provided with the record that could be affixed to a spot indicated on the package. The album was dedicated to Evgeny Lishchenko (the recently deceased Letov's friend and member of Pik Klaxon band from Omsk) and the Cameroon national football team.

The second album, Sto let odinochestva (One Hundred Years of Solitude), was recorded between January 1991 and June 1992, and released in 1993. It included the song "Tuman" (Fog) from the Communism album Khronika pikiruyushchego bombardirovshchika (Chronicles of a Dive Bomber), recorded in 1989 and originally issued in 1990.

In 1993, the band started recording what would become their third and final album, Psychedelia Tomorrow, but in autumn 1993 Grazhdanskaya Oborona reunited shortly after the album was finished, resulting in it going unreleased until the end of the decade. In 1999, Yegor Letov went back into the studio and mixed and mastered the recordings, releasing them in 2001.

The band was a studio-only project - they never gave interviews or played live, however the reformed Grazhdanskaya Oborona did play some songs from Pryg-skok and Sto let odinochestva live. A notable performance of such a song is the performance of "Pryg-skok" at the concert immortalised on the album Svoboda in 2002.

The last album of Grazhdanskaya Oborona, Zachem snyatsya sny? (What are dreams dreamt for?), was planned as an album of Yegor i Opizdenevshie.

A 2003 demo tape containing early versions of tracks that would be used on the Grazhdanskaya Oborona albums Dolgaya schastlivaya zhizn (A Long Happy Life) and Reanimatsiya (Resuscitation), and a 2006 demo tape containing early versions of tracks later used in the album Zachem snyatsya sny? (What are dreams dreamt for?), both featuring Letov on vocals, guitar and a programmed drum machine, was released in 2024 and 2025 respectively under the Yegor i Opizdenevshie name.

== Discography ==
| Date of Release | Title | Translation |
|---|---|---|
| 1990 | Прыг-скок (Pryg-skok) | Jump-Hop (or Jump-Jump) |
| 1993 | Сто лет одиночества (Sto let odinochestva) | One Hundred Years of Solitude |
| 2000 | Психоделия Tomorrow (Psychodelia Tomorrow) | Psychedelia Tomorrow |
| 2003 (2024) | Со скоростью мира (So skorost'yu mira) | At the Speed of the World |
| 2006 (2025) | Затем снятся сны! (Zatem snyatsya sny!) | This is What are Dreams Dreamt For! |

The album Pryg-skok (Jump-Hop) was reissued with bonus-tracks.

In addition to this albums, there is unreleased material.

== Personnel ==
- Yegor Letov – vocals, guitar, drums
- Igor Zhevtun – guitar, bass
- Konstantin Ryabinov – guitar, bass, organ
