= Solntsevorot =

Studio album by Grazhdanskaya Oborona
- Released: 06 May 1997
- Genres: Psychedelic rock, shoegaze, alternative rock
- Length: 48:45
- Language: Russian
- Labels: GrOb Records, ХОР Records, Vyrgorod

Solntsevorot (Russian: Солнцеворот, Solstice) is the eighteenth studio album by the Soviet-formed Russian punk rock band Grazhdanskaya Oborona, released in the year 1997 together with the album "Nevynosimaya legkost bytiya". It was re-recorded in 2005 under the name Lunnyy Perevorot.

== Track listing ==
All tracks are written by Yegor Letov.

No.	Title	Length
1.	"Solnstevorot (Solstice)"	3:58
2.	"Pro zyorna, fakel i pesok (Concerning grains, a torch, and sand)"	3:46
3.	"Rodina (Motherland)"	4:32
4.	"Nechego teryat' (Nothing to lose)"	3:49
5.	"Myortvyye (The dead)"	2:43
6.	"Daleko bezhit doroga (Vperedi vesel'ya mnogo) (Far runs the road (There is a lot of fun ahead))"	5:27
7.	"Novyy den' (New day)"	3:22
8.	"Pro durachka (Concerning a little fool)"	4:51
9.	"Pozdno (Late)"	2:36
10.	"Zabota u nas takaya (Such is our concern)"	5:20
11.	"Zhit' (Life)"	3:23
12.	"Dembel'skaya (Demobilization)"	4:58
Total length:		48:45

== Personnel ==
- Yegor Letov - voice, guitar, drums, bass, harmonica, percussion
- Igor Zhevtun - guitar, bass
- Yevgenii Makhno - guitar
- Konstantin Ryabinov - organ, guitar, bass, harmonica, vibraphone, percussion
- Anna Volkova - voice, electric violin, harmonica, percussion
