= Oleg Sudakov =

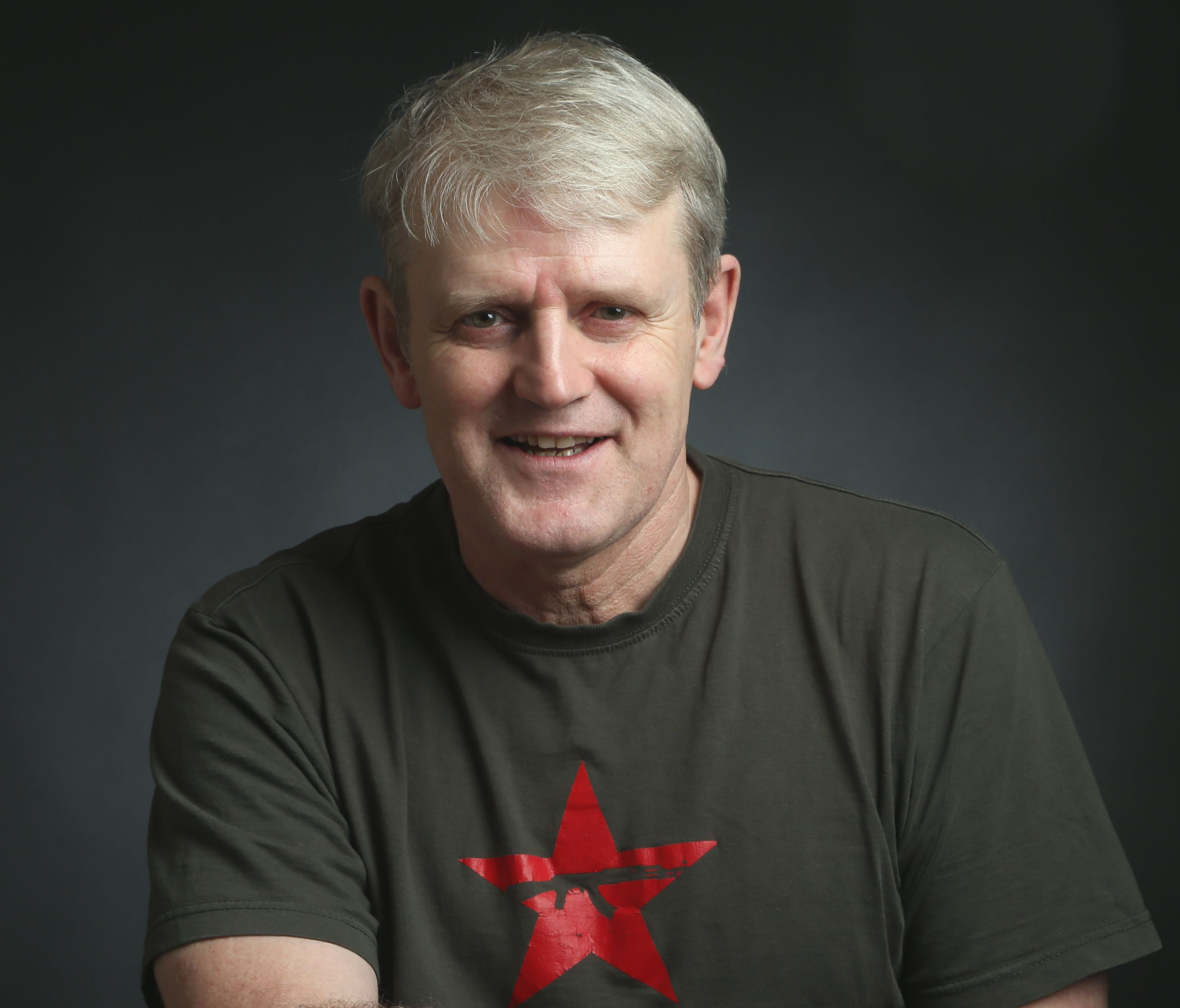
- Oleg Sudakov in 2020

Background information
- Born: Oleg Mikhailovich Sudakov; 4 May 1962 (age 64); Novosibirsk, USSR
- Genres: Folk punk, art punk, garage rock, punk rock, post-punk, experimental rock, contemporary folk
- Occupations: vocalist, musician, poet, songwriter
- Instrument: guitar
- Years active: 1987 - present
- Labels: GrOb-records, UR-REALIST, Rebel Records
- Website: http://manager.lenin.ru/

Oleg Sudakov (Russian: Олег Судаков; 4 May 1962), better known as Manager. is a Russian musician, poet, artist, and publicist.

He has been the lead singer of Manager & Rodina, Tsyganyata i Ya s Ilyicha, Anarkhiya, and Armiya Vlasova. A frequent collaborator of Yegor Letov, he co-authored several songs for Grazhdanskaya Oborona and co-founded the band Kommunizm with Letov and Konstantin Ryabinov. From 2002 to 2005, Sudakov was leader of the Novosibirsk branch of the National Bolshevik Party.

== Discography ==
Anarkhiya

- 1988 — Paralich

Grazhdanskaya Oborona

- 1988 — Svet i stul'ya (live in Novosibirsk, released in 2001)

Armiya Vlasova

- 1989 — Armiya Vlasova

Kommunizm

- 1988 — Na sovetskoy skorosti
- 1988 — Suleiman Stal'skiy
- 1989 — Rodina slyshit
- 1989 — Soldatskiy son

Rodina

- 1994 — Russkiy proryv v Kiyeve
- 1994 — Russskiy proryv v Moskve
- 1995 — Byt' zhivym
- 2002 — Tot svet
- 2004 — Kolesnitsa zvyozd
- 2008 — Dobrovol'ny Edem
- 2014 — Na blazhennom ostrove kommunizma

Tsyganyata i Ya s Ilyicha

- 1989 - Gaubitsy leitenanta Guruby
- 1990 - Ardzhuna-Draiv
