= Kommunizm (band) =

Soviet-Russian band

- Origin: Omsk, Russian SFSR, Soviet Union
- Genres: Experimental rock; noise; industrial; art punk; spoken word
- Years active: 1988–1990, 2010–2018
- Labels: GrOb, HOR/Moroz, Stanzmarke, Misteriya Zvuka, Wyrgorod
- Members: Oleg "Manager" Sudakov; Igor Zhevtun; Alexander Andryushkin; Sergey Letov
- Past members: Yegor Letov; Konstantin "Kuzya UO" Ryabinov; Yanka Dyagileva; Oleg "Sur" Surusin; Valery Rozhkov; Aleksandr "Ivanych" Rozhkov; Sergey Zelensky; Anna "Nyurych" Volkova

Kommunizm (Russian: Коммунизм, lit. 'Communism') was a Soviet-Russian conceptual collective from Omsk, USSR, founded in January 1988 by Yegor Letov, Konstantin "Kuzya UO" Ryabinov and Oleg "Manager" Sudakov. It was considered one of the most radical musical experiments of the late USSR, and an important example of musical conceptual art.

== History ==
The creators of the project were guided by the fact that it is impossible for any artist to express the absurdity, the nightmarishness, and the playfulness (which invariably accompany the first two components) of the reality surrounding them more adequately, more richly, and more profoundly than reality itself, including its objects and manifestations, for example, works of folk and official culture, and concrete music.

As Sudakov recalled, after celebrating New Year in 1988, the three members read aloud a Soviet poetry collection from the Khrushchev era. They sang the poem "My Ameriku Dogonim Na Sovetskoy Skorosti!" (We'll Catch Up with America at Soviet Speed!) along the instrumental track "Popcorn", and they decided to record an album based on that poetry collection. Thus, the project's first album, Na Sovetskoy Skorosti (At Soviet Speed) was born. The three members used the aliases Konstantin Ustinych, Nikita Sergeeyevich, and Leonid Ilyich. The album contains ironic and parodic renditions of poems praising labor and communism. Notably, the song "Radostno na Dushe" (Joyful in the Soul) from this album was performed multiple times by their band Grazhdanskaya Oborona in concerts during 1988. In February 1988, Kommunizm recorded their second album Suleyman Stalsky, with all the text written by the Dagestani (Lezgin) poet Suleyman Stalsky during the Lenin and Stalin eras. After these two albums, the project temporarily ceased to operate for about a year because of the members' focus on their main band Grazhdanskaya Oborona.

In March 1989, the third album Veselyashchiy Gaz (Laughing Gas) was recorded by Letov and Ryabinov without Sudakov's participation. The music (mostly noise rock and thrash metal) and lyrics (featuring avant-garde poetry by Ryabinov) were all written by the duo. Sudakov was very displeased with this, as he wanted to return Kommunizm to its original intention. The fourth album Rodina slyshit (Homeland is Hearing), a collage of punk, orchestra music, concrete music and spoken word, and the fifth Soldatsky Son (Soldier's Dream), containing lyrics from a demobilization album, were consequently recorded in March 1989. After this album, Sudakov left the project.

The sixth, seventh and ninth albums Chudo-muzyka (Miracle Music), Narodovedenie (Ethnology) and Zhizn chto skazka (Life is a Fairy Tale) are recorded in 1989, consisting of speeches, ditties, phonograms and performances. The eighth Satanizm (Satanism) was a "genuine season in hell" invoking noise, ritual rhythms, and shamanic vocal delivery. The tenth Let It Bi (Let It Be) was composed of American folk and rock songs from the 60s. The eleventh Igra v samoletiki pod krovatyu (Playing Airplanes Under the Bed) was recorded at industrial and household dumps near Omsk, featuring industrial avant-garde, intricate studio sound effects, and concrete music.

The article Kontseptual'izm Vnutri (Conceptualism Inside), written by Letov and Ryabinov and published in the Soviet samizdat "Kontr Kul't Ura" (Counterculture), described the motivation of these creations:

The most absurd and offensive thing is that no one has grasped the meaning of this act (i.e., rock 'n' roll ) for a long time. Here we will cheat and outsmart. Hey! "It's a great pleasure to live on earth!" Great. Living and creating in the glorious and turbulent time of ARMAGEDDON, we affirm the total SHAME and DISGRACE of human existence—all its slobbery matchstick culture, all its heady virtues, its manna benefits, punishing codes, hand-to-hand hopes, and worm-like, intricate nature. Does anything make sense these days? We think that an HONEST person (i.e., a madman, whose daring values we affirm, surrounded by your fire-breathing common sense and fundamentally marvelous survival instinct) should not live. An honest man, like Dostoevsky's Idiot, must either die of shame and grief physically upon first looking around, or, inevitably dying internally, must, in the process of awakening, ecstatically perform all sorts of "foo-foo", "gyr-gyr", "sa-sa-sa", and other marvelous acts in the name of HIS own, nonexistent value system, in the name of his own, never-existent JUSTICE. An abstract, lost war on an invisible, unseen front. Apparently, this is the TRUE FATE of the coming, exuberant era.

The twelfth album Leniniana (loosely translated as "Collection of art dedicated to Lenin") was recorded in November 1989. Letov described it as "grotesque, multicolored, painful and scary in its pain". The thirteenth Trinadtsat (Thirteen) was a collection of unpublished tracks during the previous recordings. The fourteenth and the last album, Khronika pikiruyushchego bombardirovshchika (Chronicle of a Dive Bomber), was recorded in 1990. The music of the latest album was a sharp departure from Kommunizm's previous releases. It was dominated by guitar-driven folk with a psychedelic edge. Yanka Dyagileva played a prominent role in the album's sound, performing Tanich's Tanich's "Belyy Svet" (White Light), Oshanin's "Nichego ne Vizhu" (I See Nothing), the folk song "Sad" (Garden), and her own song, "Nyurkina Pesnya" (Nyurka's Song), bringing the album's sound as close to folk as possible. It was considered the best album of the project. As Letov said in 2006:

This is the final album of KOMMUNIZM, and it is definitely a unique, landmark work. Firstly, because in this case, for the first time, we ourselves finally became the conceptual object, primarily with our own original, previously unused material and an extremely responsible approach to it (previously, we had explored all sorts of "foreign", extraneous aspects of existence, its manifestations, perceptions, and interpretations). Secondly, as I wrote then, this is "the final and highest, in my opinion, achievement of KOMMUNIZM, and perhaps of all of us, the GrOb-ers" (Yegor Letov, "GrOb-Chronicles", 10.09–10.11.90). Thirdly, this album is essentially a transitional link from the old POSEV/ G.O./ KOMMUNIZM principle to EGOR i OPIZDENEVSHIE (it can be considered the new group's groundbreaking project) and the late formation of GRAZHDANSKAYA OBORONA. In fact, this album is the only and final instance of this lineup's collaboration and existence. At this juncture, a certain era came to an end—KOMMUNISM and G.O. ended, Kuzma Ryabinov left for St. Petersburg, and some time later, Yanka passed away.

In 1996 and 2015, Kommunizm released a four-part compilation and a two-part one, both under the name Blagodat' (Blessing) and with similar cover designs. The two compilations contain songs of the projects Kommunizm, Tsyganyata i Ya s Ilyicha, Yegor i Opizdenevshiye, and also the personal project of Evgeny "Makhno" Pyanov, the guitarist of Grazhdanskaya Oborona during the 1990s.

"Kommunizm" always existed as a studio conceptual project. Letov performed only a few of the project's songs during his lifetime (1964–2008) at concerts. In 2010, after Letov's death, Oleg Sudakov announced the revival of Kommunizm. He claimed that this idea had long been on Letov's mind, and that he had planned to reunite with Sudakov and Ryabinov to perform songs by Kommunizm and Tsyganyata i Ya s Ilyicha, going so far as to call Sudakov on the phone five days before his death to suggest a live performance of the latter. Also, Sudakov had long wanted to "put a mirror in the middle of capitalism", since "the ugly face was peeking out from every crack". From 2010 to 2018, the group gave multiple concerts in Russia and Ukraine. In 2019, Ryabinov and Sudakov began recording Kommunizm's fifteenth album, Granitsa schastia (Border of Happiness). It was released in July 2021, after the death of Ryabinov in 2020.

== Concept and artistic approach ==
Earthly life proved to be trapped in a labyrinth of flesh, and socialism and capitalism were similar systems of the total materialization of thought. An antithesis to this mortification was needed, not a form of social organization, but a different vision of existence. That's why they chose the name "Kommunizm". Though provocative, it sounded beautiful—harmony for all, without control, so that gravity would weaken and death would retreat. Crushing vanity, power, and egoism, and stepping into the naked spirit. Without safety net or self-interest, flinging ourselves wide open, so that here and now, so that health and eternity. Dissolving into radiance or vanishing into nothingness.

— Oleg Sudakov, 2010

Unlike Grazhdanskaya Oborona, Kommunizm has a wide range of genres, from demobilization songs to industrial noise songs. In fact, many albums have almost no regular songs, they are more of an "sound collage". The project's musicians created and recorded objects of so-called "communism art": in addition to compositions written by the project participants themselves, the recordings used elements of works by a wide variety of authors - Lev Oshanin, Robert Rozhdestvensky, Yevgeny Yevtushenko, Suleyman Stalsky, Vasily Rozanov, Franz Kafka, Daniil Kharms, Ishikawa Takuboku, Leonid Andreyev, Sergei Mikhalkov, Vladimir Lenin, Leonid Brezhnev, Ho Chi Minh, Johann Sebastian Bach, Public Image Limited, Ramones, Buzzcocks, the Francis Goya Orchestra and many others in the form of texts, samples, fragments of phonograms.

According to Sudakov, the project's creative direction was guided by an unspoken shared understanding of what "Communism" represented. He described their approach using Bertolt Brecht's concept of the "distancing effect", wherein cultural artifacts are viewed from a different perspective and context, allowing them to reveal previously unnoticed aspects. They applied this method to various works of Soviet mass, grassroots, and official culture, discovering absurdity but also, unexpectedly, sincerity. As Sudakov said, even propagandistic material could possess a striking genuineness that inspired the group to recontextualize it. The resulting albums were recorded "with a fair amount of reckless mirth, irony, and other such quirks," though the musicians did not intend vulgar mockery.

Sudakov noted that after recording their first album, Na Sovetskoy Skorosti (At Soviet Speed), the participants experienced an unsettling realization: the reality they sought to critique could itself "bite", "bare its teeth", and potentially consume them. This awareness deepened during the recording of their second album, when the "primordial sincerity" of the Dagestani poet Suleyman Stalsky's verses intersected with Letov's intense musical delivery. Sudakov described the resulting tracks, such as "Gornye Orly" (Mountain Eagles, dedicated to the horsemen participating in the run around the Caucasus Mountains), as having a powerful, almost unnerving effect on the subconscious.

In the following albums, the group continued to develop the Kommunizm project, moving "step by step" in their chosen direction. Their work is characterized as a form of "Zen Buddhism"—an "attitude towards oneself" aimed at expanding consciousness. The underlying premise was that absurdity reigned in the reality surrounding them; by distancing themselves from it while remaining able to re-enter it, they could explore its "curious and unusual" laws.

== Discography ==
The band released fourteen albums during their original run (1988–1990), a four-part compilation in 1996, and a two-part compilation in 2015. Some of the albums were reissued on CD in 2000–2003 through the label HOR, and in 2007 some were remastered and reissued with bonus tracks by Misteriya Zvuka. Letov and his wife Natalia Chumakova had privately remastered the entire discography in 2005. Between 2013 and 2015, Wyrgorod carried out a reissue campaign of Kommunizm's entire discography, based on the 2005 remasters.

1. Na sovetskoy skorosti (1988, officially released in 2003)
2. Suleyman Stalsky (1988, officially released in 2005)
3. Veselyashchiy gaz (1989, officially released in 2002)
4. Rodina slyshit (1989, officially released in 2013)
5. Soldatskiy son (1989, officially released in 2000)
6. Chudo-muzyka (1989, officially released in 2013)
7. Narodovedenie (1989, officially released in 2013)
8. Satanizm (1989, officially released in 2007)
9. Zhizn chto skazka (1989, officially released in 2014)
10. Let It Be (1989, officially released in 2002)
11. Igra v samoletiki pod krovatyu (1989, officially released in 2003)
12. Leniniana (1989, officially released in 2001)
13. Trinadtsat (1990, officially released in 2014)
14. Khronika pikiruyushchego bombardirovshchika (1990, officially released in 2002)
15. Granitsa schastia (2021)

Compilations:

1. Blagodat' I-IV (1996)
2. Blagodat' I & II (2015)

== See also ==
- DK (band)
- Цыганята и Я с Ильича
- Христосы на паперти
