= Yegor Letov =

Russian musician (1964–2008)

Yegor Letov Егор Летов
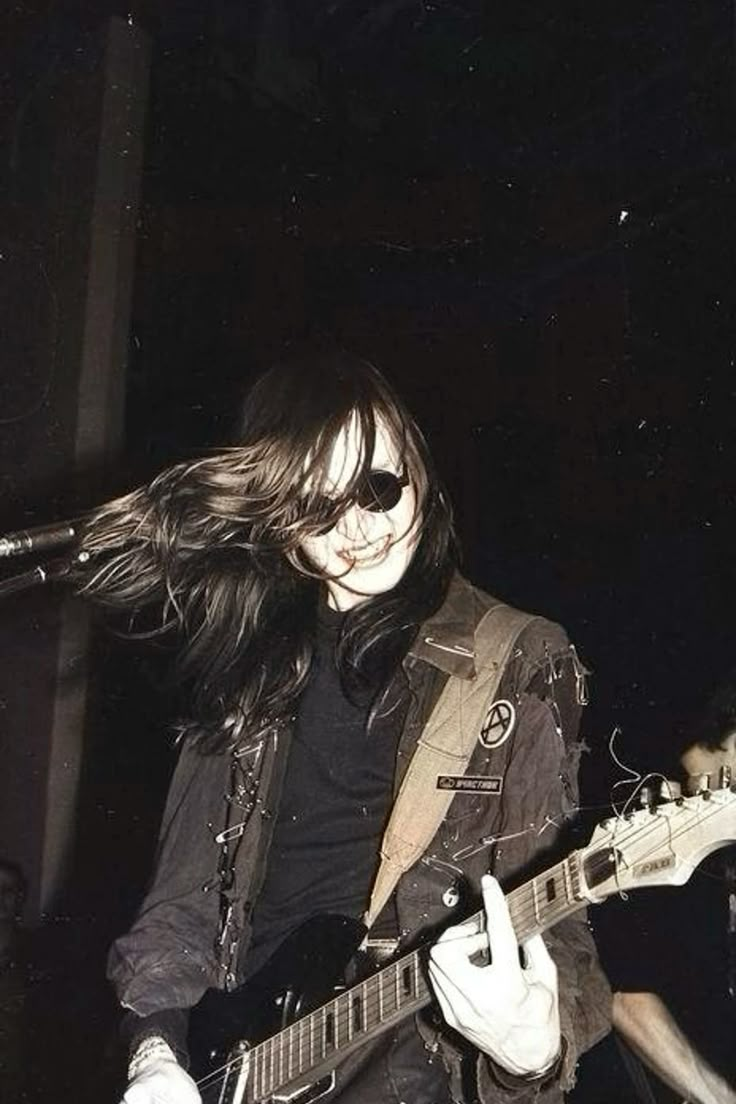
- Letov in 1989

Background information
- Also known as: Egor Letov
- Born: Igor Fedorovich Letov; 10 September 1964; Omsk, Russian SFSR, Soviet Union
- Died: 19 February 2008 (aged 43) Omsk, Russian Federation
- Genres: Avant-garde; Garage; Hardcore; Folk punk; Folk rock; Industrial; Experimental; Noise rock; Punk; Post-punk; Plunderphonics; Psychedelic; Shoegaze
- Occupations: Poet; musician; vocalist; singer-songwriter; producer; painter
- Instruments: Guitar; bass guitar; drums; noises; tape loops
- Years active: 1982–2008
- Labels: GrOb Records; Zolotaya Dolina (on LP 1992–1994); BSA; HOR; Misteriya Zvuka; Vyrgorod
- Formerly of: Grazhdanskaya Oborona; Kommunizm; Yegor i Opizdenevshiye
- Website: http://www.gr-oborona.ru

Igor "Yegor" Fyodorovich Letov (Russian: И́горь "Его́р" Фёдорович Ле́тов, IPA: [ˈiɡərʲ jɪˈɡor ˈfʲɵdərəvʲɪtɕ ˈlʲetəf]; 10 September 1964 – 19 February 2008) was a Russian singer-songwriter, best known as the founder and leader of the post-punk/psychedelic rock band Grazhdanskaya Oborona (Russian: Гражданская Оборона, lit. 'Civil Defense'), as well as the founder of the conceptual art avant-garde project Kommunizm and psychedelic rock outfit Yegor i Opizdenevshiye. Letov collaborated with singer-songwriter Yanka Dyagileva and other Siberian underground artists as a record engineer and producer.

Letov was one of the key figures of the Siberian punk scene. Posthumously, Letov has been called the "father" and "patriarch" of Russian punk rock, a "musical legend", and one of the most influential figures of the punk movement in Russia.

In addition to music, Letov was politically active, changing his political views from an anarchist rejection of the Soviet system in the late 1980s to national communism in the early 1990s. Together with Eduard Limonov and Alexander Dugin, he founded the controversial National Bolshevik Party (NBP), now banned in Russia. He later distanced himself from the NBP over personal disagreements and instead endorsed the Communist Party candidate Gennady Zyuganov in the 1996 presidential election. In the last years of his life, he completely distanced himself from political activity and stated his opposition to all forms of totalitarianism.

== Biography ==
=== Early life ===
Igor Fyodorovich Letov was born on 10 September 1964 in Omsk to Tamara Georgievna Letova (née Martemyanova) (1935–1988) and Fyodor Dmitriyevich Letov (1926–2018). Fyodor was a military man and, in the 1990s, was secretary of the district committee of the Communist Party of the Russian Federation in Omsk. His brother, Sergei Letov (born 1956), is a saxophonist and was a member of the rock band DK and Sergey Kuryokhin's project Pop-Mechanics. The Letov family came from the Kungursky Uyezd of the Perm Governorate.

On 25 May 1982, Letov graduated from 10th grade of School No. 45 in Omsk. After school, he moved to Sergei in Kraskovo, Moscow Oblast, and entered a Moscow construction vocational school; in the spring of 1983, he was expelled for truancy and poor academic performance and by 1984 he returned to Omsk. After his expulsion, he worked for some time as a propaganda artist, drawing portraits of Lenin for visual propaganda stands, as well as a janitor and a plasterer at a construction site.

=== 1980s: Early career ===
Letov began his musical career in the early 1980s in Omsk, forming the rock group Posev in 1982 together with Andrey "Boss" Babenko, named after Posev, the socio-political magazine of the National Alliance of Russian Solidarists. Letov's first musical performance, as bass guitarist, took place in late 1983 in the Moscow Engineering Physics Institute dormitory, as part of Sergey Kuryokhin's improvisation ensemble.

On 8 November 1984, Letov and Konstantin "Kuzya UO" Ryabinov formed the rock band Grazhdanskaya Oborona, also known by the abbreviations Gr.Ob and G.O.; Letov also used this abbreviation for the name of his home studio, GrOb Records. Due to Melodiya's monopoly in the record industry as the state-owned record label in the Soviet Union, many musicians at the time, including Letov, were compelled to record music in apartment conditions. This practice was continued even after the collapse of the Soviet Union; all of Grazhdanskaya Oborona's albums were recorded in the GrOb Records home studio.

In 1985, the KGB began investigating Letov; in the fall of the same year, Letov was sent for compulsory treatment to a psychiatric hospital, where he was forced to take anti-psychotic drugs. According to Letov himself, he was diagnosed with sluggish schizophrenia. According to his brother Sergei, Letov was diagnosed with suicidal syndrome. Letov was in the hospital from 8 December 1985 to 8 March 1986. In his biography, Letov describes this period as follows:

I was on “intensive care”, on neuroleptics. Before the mental hospital, I was afraid that there are some things that a person cannot withstand. On a purely physiological level, they cannot. I thought that this would be the worst thing. In the mental hospital, when they started pumping me with super-strong doses of neuroleptics, neuleptil — after a huge dose of neuleptil, I even temporarily went blind — I first encountered death or something worse than death. This treatment with neuroleptics is the same everywhere, both here and in America. It all starts with “restlessness”. After the introduction of an excessive dose of these drugs like haloperidol, a person must mobilize all his strength to control his body, otherwise hysteria, convulsions, and so on begin. If a person breaks down, shock sets in; he turns into an animal, screaming, yelling, biting. Then, according to the rules, “tying up” followed. Such a person was tied to a bed, and they continued to inject him until he burned out “completely”. Until he had an irreversible change in his psyche. These are suppressive drugs that make a moron out of a person. The effect is similar to a lobotomy. After this, a person becomes "soft", "compliant", and broken for life. Like in the novel One Flew Over the Cuckoo's Nest.

At some point, I realized that in order not to go crazy, I must create. I walked around and composed all day: I wrote stories and poems. Every day, the "Manager", Oleg Sudakov, came to me, to whom I passed through the bars everything I had written.

According to Sergei, he spread a rumor that if Letov was not released, he was going to hold a press conference, invite foreign journalists, and declare that there was no perestroika, and that musicians were being locked up in mental hospitals for no reason, after which Letov was released. On his release, Letov wrote a song about Lenin "rotting in his mausoleum".

In 1987–1989, Grazhdanskaya Oborona recorded a number of albums: Krasny al'bom (Red Album), Khorosho!! (Good!!), Myshelovka (Mouse Trap), Totalitarizm (Totalitarianism), Nekrofiliya (Necrophilia), Tak Zakalyalas Stal (Steel was Tempered That Way), Boyevoy stimul (Combat Stimulus), Vsyo idyot po planu (Everything is Going According to Plan), Pesni radosti i schast'ya (Songs of Joy and Happiness), Voina (War), Armageddon-pops, Zdorovo i vechno (Great and Everlasting), and Russkoe pole eksperimentov (Russian Field of Experiments). During those same years, Kommunizm (consisting of Letov, Konstantin Ryabinov, and Oleg "Manager" Sudakov) were recorded, and Letov began collaborating with Yanka Dyagileva.

After the Novosibirsk Rock Festival in April 1987, the KGB wanted to admit Letov into a psychiatric hospital for the second time. Letov went into hiding until November 1987, traveling with Yanka by train and hitchhiking across Ukraine and Russia. In his autobiography, he says: "In the end, thanks to the efforts of my parents, the search was stopped and I was left alone — besides, a new stage of "perestroika" was beginning, and dissidents were no longer wanted. In addition, I was already widely known, constantly giving concerts."

Despite their semi-underground nature, by the end of the 1980s and especially in the early 1990s, Grazhdanskaya Oborona had gained wide popularity in the USSR, primarily in youth circles; according to some estimates, the band had hundreds of thousands of fans. According to critics, Letov's work was distinguished by its powerful energy and presentation, unusual and original sound, lively and simple rhythm, non-standard lyrics, and rough and yet refined poetry and language.

=== 1990s ===
A flyer advertising a Russkiy proryv (Russian Breakthrough) concert in Kyiv on April 9, 1994. Letov was one of the organizers of the Russkiy proryv series of concerts.

By the early 1990s, Letov had dissolved Grazhdanskaya Oborona and recorded the albums Pryg-skok (1990) and Sto let odinochestva (1992) as part of the psychedelic project Yegor i Opizdenevshiye, which are among his most popular albums. In 1993, Letov restarted Grazhdanskaya Oborona. During this period, he was actively touring and became a leader of the National Bolshevik rock project Russkiy proryv ("Russian Breakthrough"), alongside the bands Rodina and Instruktsiya po Vyzhivaniyu.

In 1993, Letov co-founded the National Bolshevik Party with Eduard Limonov and Alexander Dugin; his party card number was 4. The party's flag was first unveiled at Letov's concert in Moscow of that same year. According to Limonov, Letov drew "thousands of recruits over the years" to the party, but "proved to be inconsistent, capricious, and unpredictable".

As part of the NBP, Letov defended what he called Soviet nationalism or "nationalism by territory" while disavowing any forms of ethnonationalism or "nationalism by blood", which he associated with Nazism. His perceived political realignment divided his fanbase. Most of the early members of the NBP were Letov's fans and supporters.

It was noted that during perestroika, Letov, while staunchly criticising the Brezhnev era and Soviet bureaucracy, never lost his admiration for the revolutionary and iconoclastic aspects of communism and Lenin, which he called "real communism" and described as "the kingdom of God on earth". These leanings became clearer after the fall of the USSR and due to the turmoil under Yeltsin. Letov, Limonov and other members of the NBP took part in the Russian constitutional crisis 1993 as defenders of the parliament. Letov was also part of the violent protest on 1 May in Moscow earlier that year.

Letov had a falling out with the party leadership and supported the CPRF candidate Gennady Zyuganov in the 1996 presidential election. From then on his engagement with the party dwindled and around 1999, he ceased contact with the party and distanced himself from politics.

In 1995–1996, Letov recorded two more albums with Grazhdanskaya Oborona, Solntsevorot and Nevynosimaya lyogkost' bytiya, both of which were released in 1997.

=== 2000s ===
In 2002, Letov's projects released two more albums: the Grazhdanskaya Oborona album Zvezdopad, consisting entirely of famous Soviet songs in Letov's original interpretation, and the Yegor i Opizdenevshiye album Psikhodeliya Tomorrow. In 2004 and 2005, Grazhdanskaya Oborona released two new albums - Dolgaya schastlivaya zhizn' and Reanimatsiya (Letov wrote the title song of the latter while he was in intensive care). At the same time, the albums Solntsevorot and Nevynosimaya lyogkost' bytiya were remixed and released under the new names Lunnyy perevorot and Snosnaya tyazhest' nebytiya respectively. On 9 May 2007, Grazhdanskaya Oborona's last album, Zachem snyatsya sny?, was released; according to a release statement authored by Letov, he considered this his best album.

By the early 2000s, Letov had renounced political activity. In February 2004, Letov officially disavowed his allegiance to any political forces, including nationalist ones. Answering a fan question in December 2004, Letov replied: "I've been in the most extreme political camps, so I know this stuff from the inside. And I can tell you that it's all quite stupid and disgusting. That's all. You have to go through it to avoid knowingly getting involved in it again in the future, which is exactly what I'll be doing." In his 2007 interview with Rolling Stone Russia, he stated: "I've always been an anarchist, and I still am. But I'm now much more interested in the ecological aspect of contemporary anarchism; I've moved in toward ecological anarchism. While this used to be loosely political, I've now completely abandoned politics, because in our country, it's a useless and foolish pursuit. Any political activity here is perceived as a kind of provocation, directed at oneself—as in the case of Limonov, for example." Additionally Letov described himself spiritually as a "global Christian" (mirovoy khristianin), although he was not a member of any church and still very critical of organized religion, placing a stronger focus on Christian existentialism.

Letov's last live performance, with Grazhdanskaya Oborona, took place on 9 February 2008 in Yekaterinburg. The concert was filmed by a local television company, and was released as a film under the name Siyanie Obrushitsya Vniz in 2018.

=== Death ===
Letov died of heart failure in his sleep on 19 February 2008 at his home in Omsk. He was 43 years old. He was buried on 21 February 2008 in Omsk at the Staro-Vostochnoye Cemetery, next to his mother's grave.

== Personal life ==
In the late 1980s, Letov was romantically involved with Yanka Dyagileva. From 1991 to 1997, Letov was married to musician Anna Volkova. In 1997, Letov married Natalia Chumakova, who also joined Grazhdanskaya Oborona as bass guitarist.

== Influences ==
Letov cited American garage rock of the 1960s as the greatest influence on the sound of Grazhdanskaya Oborona, as well as psychedelic and experimental rock, punk, and post-punk. His favorite artists included The Monks, The Sonics, Love, Sonic Youth, Butthole Surfers, Pink Floyd, as well as Bob Dylan, Neil Young, Kim Fowley, Genesis P-Orridge, and Michael Gira.

In an interview, Letov expressed that his favorite poets were Alexander Vvedensky (1904–1941), one of the OBERIU writers, and the Russian Futurist poets, such as Vladimir Mayakovsky and Aleksei Kruchenykh. At the beginning of his interest in poetry he was influenced by the Austrian poet Erich Fried. He also expressed his interest in Conceptualism, and spoke of his own work in punk music and in creating a public image as a work of conceptual performance art. Letov's favorite writers, who considerably affected his world view and writing style, were Andrei Platonov, Fyodor Dostoevsky, Henry Miller, Bruno Schulz, Flann O'Brien, Leonid Andreev, Ryunosuke Akutagawa, Kōbō Abe, and Kenzaburō Ōe.

He has said that his music, in part, reflects everything he's heard before.

== Legacy ==
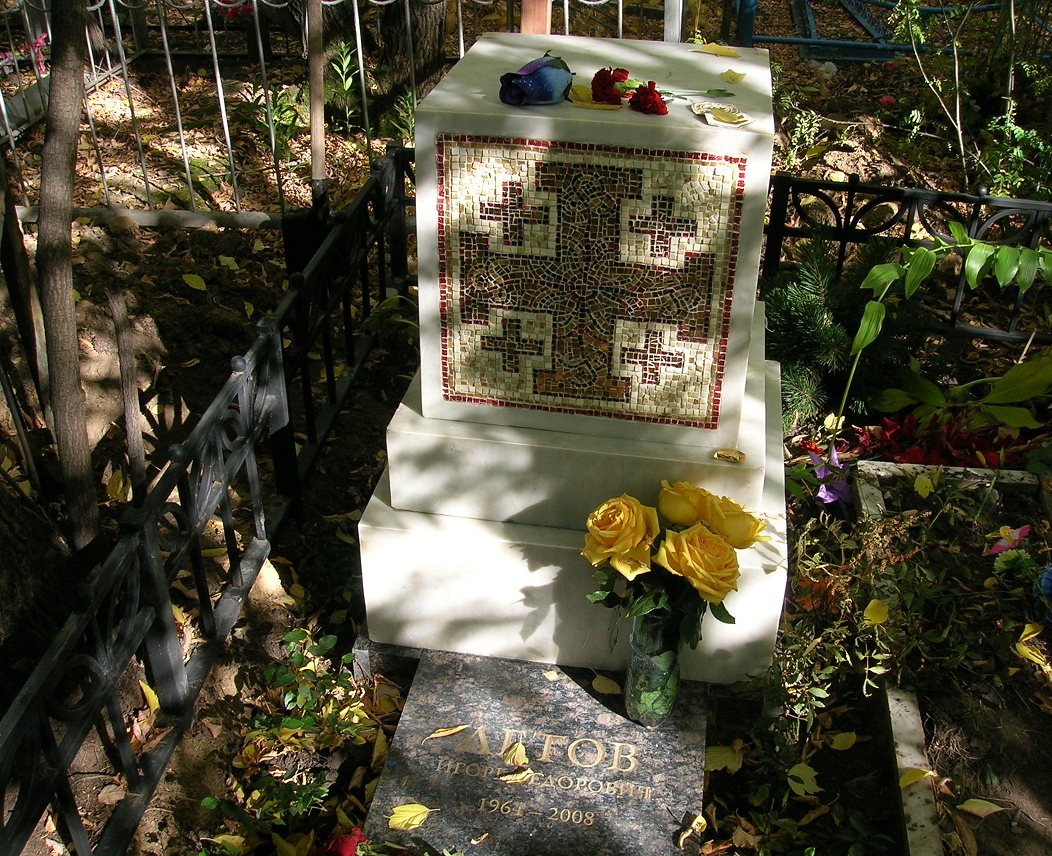
Letov's grave

Poet Elena Fanailova stated that Letov was "[A] really fucked up and really free artist, whose main and only mission was to experience limits of his own freedom" and "certainly large, significant author, who created his own world – which, though, works only in the context of the post-Soviet civilization".

Music critic Artemy Troitsky attacked Letov for his depressing and suicidal lyrics, even going as far as blaming the suicides of young people and Yanka Dyagileva on Letov.

On 20 November 2014, Natalia Chumakova released a documentary film about Letov titled Zdorovo i vechno.

In 2018, a species of beetle discovered in Vietnam, Augyles letovi, was named in honor of Letov.

== Bibliography ==
- Yegor Letov, Yanka Dyagileva, Konstantin Ryabinov. Russian field of experiments, 1994. ISBN 5-87787-004-1
- Yegor Letov. I don't believe in Anarchy, 1997. ISBN 5-87109-058-3.
- Yegor Letov. Poems, 2003. ISBN 5-85929-122-1.
- Yegor Letov. Autographs. Drafts and drawings, vol. 1, 2009. ISBN 978-5-903718-03-0
- Yegor Letov. Autographs. Drafts and drawings, vol. 2, 2011. ISBN 978-5-9902779-1-5.
- Yegor Letov. Poems (second edition), 2011. ISBN 978-5-9056230-1-1.

== Film ==
- I Don't Believe in Anarchy, Documentary, RUS/CH 2015, Dir.: Anna Tsyrlina, Natalya Chumakova.
- Project Egor Letov, Documentary, Medusa 2019.

== See also ==
- Natalia Chumakova
- Grazhdanskaya Oborona
- Yegor i Opizdenevshiye
- Kommunizm (band)
- Anarchism in Russia
- National Bolshevism
