= Natalia Chumakova =

Russian musician and journalist

- Also known as: Natalia Letova
- Born: Natalia Yurievna Chumakova; 14 July 1969 (age 57); Kirghiz SSR, USSR
- Genres: punk, post-punk, garage rock, psychedelic rock
- Instruments: singing, bass guitar, keyboards
- Years active: 1997–2008 (musician)
- Labels: GrOb-records, HOR, Misteriya Zvuka, Vyrgorod
- Formerly of: Grazhdanskaya Oborona
- Website: http://www.gr-oborona.ru

Natalia Yurievna Chumakova, married name Letova (Russian: Наталья Юрьевна Чумакова Летова, IPA: [nɐˈtalʲjə ˈjʉrʲjɪvnə tɕʊməˈkovə ˈlʲetəvə]), is a Russian musician and journalist, best known as the bass guitarist of the band Grazhdanskaya Oborona (1997-2008) and the widow of its leader, Yegor Letov.
