= Grazhdanskaya Oborona =

Soviet-formed Russian rock band

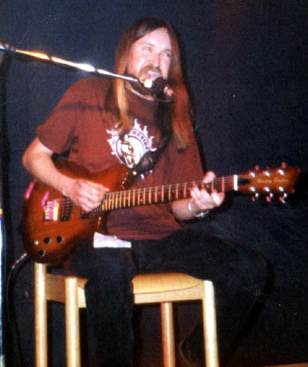

Background information
- Also known as: GrOb, GO
- Origin: Omsk, Russian SFSR, USSR
- Genres: Punk rock; noise rock; psychedelic rock; garage rock
- Years active: 1984–1985; 1986–1990; 1993–2008; 2019–2020
- Label: GrOb Records XOP Moon Records Misteriya Zvuka Wyrgorod
- Members: Natalia Chumakova; Alexander Chesnakov; Pavel Peretolchin
- Past members: Yegor Letov; Yanka Dyagileva; Konstantin "Kuzya UO" Ryabinov; Oleg Sudakov; Alexander Andryushkin, etc
- Website: http://www.gr-oborona.ru/

Grazhdanskaya Oborona (Russian: Гражданская оборона, [ɡrɐʐˈdanskəjə ɐbɐˈronə], Russian for Civil Defense, or ГО, often referred to as ГрОб, Russian for coffin) was a Soviet-Russian rock band formed by Yegor Letov and Konstantin Ryabinov in Omsk, USSR, in 1984. It was one of the earliest Soviet and Russian psychedelic/punk rock bands. They influenced many Soviet and, subsequently, Russian bands. From the early 1990s, the band's music began to evolve in the direction of psychedelic rock and shoegaze, and band leader Yegor Letov's lyrics became more metaphysical than political.

== History ==
=== Formation and early years ===
In 1982 the 18-year-old poet and musician Yegor Letov formed the band Posev (The Sowing, named after the official NTS magazine) with his friend Konstantin "Kuzya UO" Ryabinov. In 1984 Posev became Grazhdanskaya Oborona. The band was preparing to record an album, but their defiantly anti-authoritarian stance and overtly political lyrics made them an easy target for the KGB. "The mother of our [second guitarist] Babenko, she was a sort of a party official, she listened to our records and went to the KGB and said, "Comrades, my son is involved in an anti-Soviet organization", Letov recalled. In autumn 1985 Letov was committed to a mental ward, and Ryabinov was forcibly drafted into the army despite having a heart condition. Letov was released from the mental ward in March 1986 and immediately began to write and record music. He often recorded on his own, and while he credited other musicians, his collaborators went under pseudonyms as Letov remained on the outs with the Soviet system and, as he stated in an interview, the original members of GrOb were forced to sign sworn statements saying that they would stay away from Letov. In 1986–87 he recorded several cassette albums, playing all instruments himself, and released them through magnitizdat under the name of Grazhdanskaya Oborona.

=== 1987–1990 ===
In 1987 Letov was invited to perform at the Novosibirsk rock festival. "We weren't even going to play", Letov said, "but Zvuki Mu didn’t come and Murzin suggested that we play instead.". After all, he played a set with his friends Oleg and Evgeny Lischenko (from the local band Pik Klakson) under the deliberately provocative name Адольф Гитлер (Adolf Hitler), which would be released on CD in 2016. When Letov returned home, he found out the authorities were going to put him to a mental ward again. He immediately left the city with his then-partner, the fellow Siberian songwriter Yanka Dyagileva, and spent the entire year in hiding, hitch-hiking across the country until the prosecution was stopped in December 1987 with the help of Letov's relatives.

In early 1988, Letov returned home and recorded three more albums (also released under the name of Grazhdanskaya Oborona) in his home "studio", known as "GrOb Records". In the same year the reunited band started touring across the USSR.

In 1989 Grazhdanskaya Oborona released four noise rock/industrial-influenced albums (Война, Армагеддон-Попс, Здорово и вечно and Русское поле экспериментов), often considered their best. Letov's lyrics became darker and more elaborate, inspired by existentialist philosophy and literature. Some songs (e.g. "Насекомые" (Insects) from Армагеддон-Попс, "Заговор" (Spell) from Здорово и вечно) also show his interest in Siberian folklore and pre-Christian beliefs. In the same year Letov, Kuzya and Oleg "Manager" Sudakov started a conceptual, Sots Art-like side project Коммунизм (Communism), where they combined kitschy Soviet art and Stalinist poetry with noise experimentation. GrOb also collaborated with Yanka Dyagileva, who recorded with them two albums (Ангедония and Домой!, both released in 1989).

In 1990, Grazhdanskaya Oborona broke up after playing their final concert in Tallinn: Letov stated he was afraid they would turn into a "commercial pseudo-counterculture project" and decided to put the band on hiatus. After that he started the psychedelic rock project Yegor i Opizdenevshiye with Kuzya and Igor Zhevtun. They recorded and released two albums, Прыг-Скок (Pryg-Skok, Hop-Hop) and Сто лет одиночества (Sto Let Odinochestva, One Hundred Years of Solitude) (an outtakes compilation, Психоделия Tomorrow, was released in 2001). In 1990, Letov ranked Русское поле экспериментов and Прыг-Скок as his best works.

=== 1993–1997 ===
In 1993, Grazhdanskaya Oborona reformed and began playing live again, but no new material was released until 1997. In 1996, their entire discography was remastered and given an official cassette issue for the first time on the fledgling XOP label, which was a sublabel of Moroz Records used to release Letov-related material. In 1995, the anthemic, shoegaze-y Solntsevorot (Russian: Солнцеворот, lit. 'Solstice') was recorded, followed by Nevynosimaya lyogkost bytiya (Russian: Невыносимая легкость бытия, lit. 'The Unbearable Lightness of Being') in 1996. Both albums were released in 1997.

In 1999, after their first US tour, Kuzya left the band due to personal circumstances. On 28 December of the same year, the group's guitarist Evgeny "Makhno" Pyanov died after falling from the window of his apartment after a long night of drinking. He was 27 years old. Letov recruited a new guitarist (Alexander Chesnakov) and invited his wife Natalia Chumakova, whom he had met the year before, to play the bass.

=== 2000–2008 ===
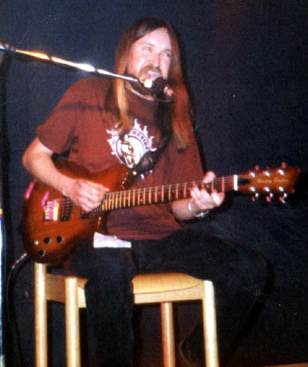
Yegor Letov live on stage during his solo concert at "Luise Cultfactory" in Nürnberg (Nuremberg), Germany (4 November 2000)

In 2002, Letov produced Zvezdopad (Russian: Звездопад, lit. 'Starfall'), an album of covers of Soviet-era songs. In the 2000s, many Russian groups recorded and performed tributes to GrOb, and in 2005, the group toured the United States. In 2004–05, the group released the critically acclaimed pair of albums Dolgaya Schastlivaya Zhizn (Russian: Долгая Счастливая Жизнь, lit. 'Long and Happy Life') (2004) and Reanimatsiya (Russian: Реанимация, lit. 'Resuscitation') (2005).

On 8 February 2004, at a GrOb concert at the Ural Palace of Culture in Ekaterinburg, a 19-year-old skinhead bashed a 23-year-old non-Slavic fan to death. The following day, Letov posted a note on the official GrOb website, "Official statement from E. Letov and GrOb regarding the events at Ekaterinburg", stating the band were "patriots, but not Nazis", disavowing any neo-Nazis who claimed to be fans of the group, linking neo-Nazism to the communism the band had grown up with and telling "totalitarians on the left and right and of all colours and stripes" to "fuck off", saying "We kindly request you no longer associate your stink with our activities".

Letov's last album, Zachem Snyatsya Sny? (Russian: Зачем снятся сны?, lit. 'What Are Dreams Dreamt For?') was released in 2007. In an interview in January 2008, Letov said that this album might be his last. This album was recorded as usual in the "GrOb studio", but is not typical of the band's earlier output. It is much brighter – Letov described it as "shining".

Letov died on 19 February 2008 in his sleep at his home in Omsk from heart and respiratory failure. He was 43 years old.

=== 2019–2020 ===
In 2019, the group reformed and announced a tour to celebrate its 35th anniversary, with Letov replaced by various collaborators, such as Igor Zhevtun (who substituted for Letov on some songs on Instruktsiya po vyzhivaniyu due to Letov having lost his voice), Oleg Sudakov (who managed Kommunizm) and Ryabinov.

The final concert of the tour took place on 23 February 2020 at the Glastonberry club in Moscow. This also proved to be Ryabinov's final public appearance – he died of a stroke several weeks later on 16 March, aged 55.

The tour caused controversy as Natalia Chumakova did not want to participate and strongly denounced it on her social media platforms.

== Musical style ==
The earliest works of Grazhdanskaya Oborona (approximately from 1982 to 1985, including Letov's project Posev before the establishment of Grazhdanskaya Oborona) features music in the genres of reggae, punk, new wave, psychedelic rock and progressive rock, with long poetic lyrics greatly influenced by absurdism, Russian futurism, and existentialism poetry, but not as provocative as later works.

After Letov's release from the mental ward, he recorded eight albums (five in 1987 and three in 1988), with all instruments played by himself. They can be described as minimalist lo-fi punk rock, post-punk and reggae, with a dirty, garage sound. The lyrics can be described as blatantly anti-Soviet, anti-fascism and anti-authoritarianism provocations from an anarchist standpoint, with extensive profanity, surreal imagery, and depictions of suicide and death. The influence of futurist poetry remains significant.

By 1989, Grazhdanskaya Oborona already had a complete and fixed band lineup and toured extensively throughout the Soviet Union. In autumn 1989, they recorded four albums (Voyna, Armageddon-Pops, Zdorovo i Vechno and Russkoe Pole Eksperimentov). The music style of these albums is a mixture of punk, post-punk, noise rock, industrial music, and dark folk. The lyrics continue the previous anti-Soviet, anti-fascist and anti-totalitarian stance, but they are much darker, and more prominent in the emotions of despair, nihilism, death and suicide, as well as apocalyptic feeling for the entire human civilization. Some songs are even influenced by the shamanism of native Siberian peoples.

In the mid-1990s, Grazhdanskaya Oborona released two albums that adopted shoegaze and psychedelic rock styles, particularly the use of multiple guitar ensembles to create a "wall of sound." Due to Letov's association with the National Bolshevik Party, the lyrics recall people of early Soviet utopian literary, such as that of Mayakovsky, as well as existentialist revolutionary resistance and optimism. Overall, the music is more brighter and more positive, even with anthemic characteristics.

In the 2000s, Grazhdanskaya Oborona's music became more brighter, incorporating shoegaze and psychedelic rock elements, some of them even can be classified as art rock (for example, Zvezdopad).

Letov was a big fan of 60s garage and psychedelic rock and named Love as his favourite band, along with The Seeds, The Monks and others. Other favourites included Butthole Surfers, The Residents, Sonic Youth, CBGB artists such as Ramones and Television, and Psychic TV. In the February 2007 web interview he said that in the late 80's he "listened only to noise and industrial – such bands as Einstürzende Neubauten, Test Dept., Throbbing Gristle, SPK, Young Gods", adding: "Now I still like and 'respect' such music and listen to it from time to time, but not that often". When asked about "newer" bands he liked, he named Japanese psychedelic bands Acid Mothers Temple, Mainliner and Green Milk from the Planet Orange, the Swiss feminist cabaret ensemble Les Reines prochaines, the Argentinian experimental band Reynols and the neo-garage band the Marshmallow Overcoat. He referred to Mark E. Smith (of The Fall), Bob Dylan, Arthur Lee and Patti Smith as his favourite rock lyricists.

== Lineup ==
=== 2019–2020 lineup ===
- Igor "Jeff" Zhevtun – vocals, guitar (1988–1989, 1989–1990, 1993–2000, 2004–2005, 2019–2020)
- Konstantin "Kuzya UO" Ryabinov – bass, guitar, keyboards, percussion, vocals, backing vocals, noise effects (1984–1985, 1988, 1989–1990, 1993–1999, 2019–2020)
- Alexander "Phantom of the Opera" Andryushkin – percussion (1994, 1997–2005, 2019–2020)
- Alexander Chesnakov – guitar, keyboards (2000–2008, 2019–2020)
- Sergey Letov – saxophone (2000–2004, 2019–2020)

=== Past members ===
- Yegor Letov – vocals, guitar, percussion, noise effects (1984–2008)
- Natalia Chumakova – bass, keyboards (1997–2008)
- Pavel Peretolchin – percussion (2005–2008)
- Andrey "Boss" Babenko – guitar (1984–85)
- Andrey "Kurt" Vasin – vocals (1985)
- Evgeny "Jeff" Filatov – guitar, harmonica, bongo (1986)
- Oleg "Pick Baby" Lischenko – guitar, vocals (1987)
- Evgeny "Eugene Clock" Lischenko – bass, vocals (1987)
- Igor "Jeff" Zhevtun – guitar (1988–1990, 1993–2000, 2004–2005)
- Arkady Klimkin – percussion (1988–90)
- Oleg "Manager" Sudakov – vocals, backing vocals (1988; also one of the founding members of Kommunizm)
- Yanka Dyagileva – backing vocals, guitar (1988, 1989, 1990)
- Dmitry Selivanov – guitar (1988)
- Evgeny "John Double" Deev – bass (1988)
- Igor Starovatov – bass (1988)
- Sergey Zelensky – bass (1989)
- Alexander "Ivanych" Rozhkov – flute (1986)
- Arkady Kuznetsov – bass (1994)
- Evgeny "Makhno" Pyanov – bass, guitar (1995–1999)
- Anna Volkova – bass, keyboards, electric fiddle, backing vocals (1995–1997)
- Evgeny "Jackson" Kokorin – guitar (1997)

== Discography ==
| Date of Release | Title | Translation |
|---|---|---|
| 1985 | Поганая молодёжь (Poganaya molodyozh') | The Foul Youth |
| 1987 | Оптимизм (Optimizm) | Optimism |
| 1987 | Мышеловка (Myshelovka) | Mousetrap |
| 1987 | Хорошо!! (Khorosho!!) | Good!! |
| 1987 | Тоталитаризм (Totalitarizm) | Totalitarianism |
| 1987 | Некрофилия (Nekrofiliya) | Necrophilia |
| 1987 | Красный альбом (Krasnyy al'bom) (re-release of demo album “Игра в бисер перед свиньями“) | Red Album (Playing Beads with Pigs) |
| 1988 | Всё идёт по плану (Vsyo idyot po planu) | Everything Is Going According To Plan |
| 1988 | Так закалялась сталь (Tak zakalyalas' stal) | That's How The Steel Was Tempered |
| 1988 | Боевой стимул (Boyevoy stimul) | Battle Stimulus |
| 1989 | Тошнота (Toshnota) | Nausea |
| 1989 | Песни радости и счастья (Pesni radosti i schast'ya) | Songs of Joy and Happiness |
| 1989 | Война (Voyna) | War |
| 1989 | Здорово и вечно (Zdorovo i vechno) | Famously And Eternally |
| 1989 | Армагеддон-Попс (Armageddon-pops) | Armageddon-pops |
| 1989 | Русское поле экспериментов (Russkoe pole eksperimentov) | Russian Field of Experiments |
| 1989 | Посев (Posev) | Sowing |
| 1990 | Инструкция по выживанию (Instruktsiya po vyzhivaniyu) | Instructions For Survival |
| 1995 | Солнцеворот (Solntsevorot) (in 2005 was re-released as “Лунный переворот“ | Solstice (Moon Revolution) |
| 1996 | Невыносимая лёгкость бытия (Nevynosimaya lyogkost' bytiya) (in 2005 was re-released as “Сносная тяжесть небытия“ | The Unbearable Lightness of Being (The Bearable Heaviness of Unbeing) |
| 2001 | Звездопад (Zvezdopad) | Starfall |
| 2004 | Долгая счастливая жизнь (Dolgaya schastlivaya zhizn) | A Long Happy Life |
| 2005 | Реанимация (Reanimatsiya) | Resuscitation |
| 2007 | Зачем снятся сны? (Zachem snyatsya sny?) | What are dreams dreamt for? |

=== Bootlegs ===
- 1985 - Istoria Omskogo panka (History of Omsk punk)
- 1985 - Psychodelia today
- 1985 - Grazhdanskaya Oborona-85
- 1985 - Ponosniye zvuchaniya (Shitty sounds)
- 1986 - Igra v biser pered svinyami (Krasny al'bom akustika)
- 1986 - Pesni v pustotu (Live) (Songs into void)
- 1989 - Krasniy marsh (Red parade)
- 1990 - Huy cherez plecho (Dick over your shoulder)
- 1990 - Pops: 1984-90

== Film ==
- Zdorovo i vechno (Awesomely and eternally), Documentary, RUS/CH 2014. Dir.: Anna Tsyrlina, Natalya Chumakova.
- I Don't Believe in Anarchy, Documentary, RUS/CH 2015, Dir.: Anna Tsyrlina, Natalya Chumakova
