= List of Ukrainian folklore collections =

Chronological list of collections containing ukrainian folklore

The following is a list of collections containing Ukrainian folklore (chronological by year of publishing).

== 17th-18th century ==
Collection	Collector(s)	Published	Notable content
Jan Dzwonowskis' Collection of satirical works	Jan Dzwonowski	Krakow, PLC, 1625	Song of the Cossack Pliakhta (c. 1612)
Manuscript collection of K.	Kondracki (?)	Krakow, PLC, 1693	"Rushylysia zhovniry z obozu" (The Soldiers Left the Camp), "Oi, nedaleko od Manachyna" (Oh, Not Far from Manachyn), "Ne khody, panoiku do mlyna spaty" (Don't Go, Lady, to Sleep at the Mill), "Oi, tekut richeiky" (Oh, the Rivers Flow), "Ta na sim botsi na tolotsi" (And on This Side of the Meadow), Duma about the Cossack Holota, two humorous duma parodies "Pro vivcharia" (About the Shepherd) and "Pro teshchu" (About the Mother-in-Law), satire on King Jan Sobieski, pisnia "pro smert shliakhtycha Samiila Koretskoho v turetskomu poloni" (Song about the death of the nobleman Samuel Koretsky in Turkish captivity, 1622)
Manuscript collection of the late 17th or early 18th century	Zakharii Dziubarevych (?)	Cossack Hetmanate or Russian Empire, 18th century	Kants "Skazhy meni, soloveiko, pravdu" (Tell me the truth, nightingale), "Oi koly liubysh" (Oh, when you love), "Oi bida, bida, meni chaitsi nebozi" (Oh, trouble, trouble for me, poor seagull), "Ot neshchasnoi doli" (About an unhappy fate)
Collection of Simple Russian songs with notes	Vasily Trutovsky	Saint Petersburg, Russian Empire, 1776-1795	13 lyrical and humorous songs such as "Oi koly ya Prudyusa liubyla" (Oh when I loved Prudius), "Oi poslala mene maty" (Oh, my mother sent me), "Na berezhku u stavka" (To the shore of the pond), etc.
A Collection of Russian Folk Songs with Their Voices	Nikolai Lvov and Ivan Prach	Russian Empire, 1790, 1806	16 Ukrainian songs such as "Da orav muzhyk krai dorohy" (A Peasant Was Plowing by the Road) "Yikhav kozak za Dunai" (A Cossack Rode Beyond the Danube), "Oi pid vyshneiu" (Oh, Under the Cherry Tree), "Naishla mene maty v tynu" (My Mother Found Me in the Garden), "Kotylysia vozy z hory" (Carts Rolled Down the Hill)

== 19th century ==
Collection	Collectors	Location	Published	Notable content
Opyt sobraniia starinnykh malorossiiskikh pesen (An Attempt at a Collection of Ancient Little Russian Songs)	Nikolai Tsertelev	Russian Empire	Russian Empire, in 1819	
Malorossiiskie pesni (Little Russian Songs)	Mykhailo Maksymovych	Russian Empire	Moscow, Russian Empire, in 1827	
Pieśni polskie i ruskie ludu galicyjskiego (Polish and Ruthenian Songs of the Galician People)	L. Gołębiowski, Wacław Zaleski	Galicia, Austrian Empire	Lemberg, Austrian Empire, 1833	
Ukrainskie narodnye pesni (Ukrainian Folk Songs)	Mykhailo Maksymovych	Russian Empire	Russian Empire, in 1834	
Nas'ki ukraïns'ki kazky (Our Own Ukrainian Fairy Tales)	Osyp Bodianskyi	Russian Empire	1835	Ukrainian fairy tales
Rusalka Dnistrovaia (The Dnister Nymph)	Ruthenian Triad	Austrian Empire	Buda, Austrian Empire, in December 1836; republished in Ternopil (1910), Kyiv (1950, 1972), Philadelphia (1961)	first Ukrainian literary and folkloric almanac published in Galicia
Malorossiskie i chervonorusskie narodnye dumy i pesni (Little Russian and Red Rus’ Folk Dumy and Songs)	Platon Lukashevych	Red Ruthenia (western Ukraine), Austrian Empire and Malorossia (central Ukraine) region, Russian Empire	Russian Empire, in 1836	176 folk songs of various genres, dumy about Samiilo Kishka, the Cossack Holota, and the storm on the Black Sea, and the captives’ lament
6 Volume collection of dumy and historical songs	Izmail Sreznevsky	Kharkov gubernia, Poltava gubernia, and Yekaterinoslav gubernia of the Russian empire	Russian Empire, 1833–8 in Zaporozhskaia starina (Zaporozhian Antiquity)	Dumy and historical songs with commentaries
Pieśni ludu ruskiego w Galicyi (Songs of the Ruthenian People in Galicia)	Żegota Pauli	Galicia, Austrian Empire	Austrian Empire, 2 vols, 1839–40	
Vinok rusynam na obzhynky (A Garland for Ruthenians during the Harvest)	Yakiv Holovatskyi	Austrian Empire	Austrian Empire, 1846–7	transcriptions of folk tales
Sbornik ukrainskikh pesen (A Collection of Ukrainian Songs, pt 1)	Mykhailo Maksymovych	Russian Empire	Kiev, Russian Empire, in 1849	
Narodnye iuzhnorusskie pesni (South Russian Folk Songs, 1854)	Amvrosii Metlynskyi	Russian Empire	1854	
two-volume collection Zapiski o Iuzhnoi Rusi (Notes on Southern Rus’)	Panteleimon Kulish, Lev Zhemchuzhnikov	Russian Empire	Russian Empire, 1856–7	Volume one consists of dumas, folk songs and legends about leading Zaporozhian Cossacks, Cossack battles against the Tatars, and struggles of the Cossacks against the Church Union of Berestia; Volume two contains folk tales recorded by Lev Zhemchuzhnikov, an account of a meeting with the kobzar Ostap Veresai, accounts of haidamaka uprisings (the manuscript of S. Zakrzewski), a number of articles on Ukrainian ethnography, and linguistics
Gramatika česká (Czech Grammar)	Jan Blahoslav (between 1551–71)	village Benatok,Transcarpathia	1857	Song about Stephen the Voivode
Yuzhno-ruski pisni z holosamy (South Russian songs with voices)	Mykola Markevych	Russian Empire	1857	Lyrical, humorous songs, folk romances
Ocherk staroslavianskogo basnosloviia, ili mifologiia (A Study of Old Slavic Fables, or Mythology)	Yakiv Holovatskyi	Slavic world	Austrian Empire, in 1860	Study of Old Slavic Fables, or Mythology
Byt podolian (The Podilians’ Folkways)	Kalenyk Sheikovskyi	Podolia, Russian Empire	1860	ethnographic study on folkways in Podolia
Starosvetskii bandurista (Old World Banduryst)	Mykola Zakrevskyi	Russian Empire	3 vols, 1860–1	collection of dumas, folk songs, proverbs, and riddles, Vol.3 contained a dictionary of ukrainian idioms (over 11,000 words)
Sobranye malorossyiskykh narodnykh pesen (v 2-kh ch., 1660-1861) “Collection of Little Russian Folk Songs” (in 2 parts, 1660-1861)	Alois Jedlička	Russian Empire	1861	Lyrical, humorous songs, folk romances
Pisni, dumky i shumky ukrainskoho narodu na Podoli, Ukraini i v Malorosii (Songs, Dumy, and Shumky of the Ukrainian People in Podolia, Ukraine, and Little Russia)	Antoni Kocipiński, others	Podolia, Southern Ukraine, Dnieper Ukraine, Russian Empire	1861	
Ukrainski narodni pisni, vydani koshtom O.Balinoi (Ukrainian folk songs, published at the expense of O.Balina)		Russian Empire	Kharkov, Russian Empire, 1863 by O. Balina	
Vasylkovskyi solovei (The Nightingale of Vasylkiv)	S. Karpenko	Vasylkiv (Dnieper Ukraine), Russian Empire	1864	Lyrical, humorous songs, folk romances
Ukraïns’ki prykazky, prysliv'ia ta inshe (Ukrainian Proverbs, Sayings, Etc)	Matvii Nomys, Mykola Bilozersky, Vasyl Bilozersky, Panteleimon Kulish, Vasyl Lazarevsky, Opanas Markovych, Stepan Rudansky, and Marko Vovchok	Russian Empire	Russian Empire, in 1864, repr 1985	collection of 14,339 proverbs and sayings (not including the variants) and 505 riddles
"Narodni pisni z holosom" (Folk Songs with Voice”)		Russian Empire	1868 by Semen Hulak-Artemovskyi	
Zbirnyk ukraïns'kykh narodnykh pisen' (A Collection of Ukrainian Folk Songs)	Mykola Lysenko, Ivan Franko, Lesia Ukrainka, Ivan Karpenko-Karyi, M. Sadovsky, M. Zankovetska, and others	Russian Empire	7 vols, 1868–1911 by Mykola Lysenko	
‘Ocherk narodnykh iuridicheskikh obychaev i poniatii v Malorossii’ (Outline of Folk Juridical Customs and Concepts in Little Russia)	Pavlo Chubinskyi	Russian Empire	Russian Empire, 1869 in Zapiski Imperatorskogo russkogo geograficheskogo obshchestva	
Narodnye iuzhno-russkie skazki (South Russian Folk Tales)	I. Rudchenko	Russian Empire	2 vols, 1869–70	
Pohliad na usnu slovesnist' ukraïns'ku’ (A View on Ukrainian Oral Literature)	Panteleimon Kulish	Russian Empire	Russian Empire, 1870 in Pravda	romantic-populist interpretation of folklore
Dvesty shestnadtsat narodnykh ukraïns'kykh napevov (Two Hundred and Sixteen Ukrainian Folk Melodies)	O. Rubets		1872	
Chumatskie narodnye pesni (Chumak Folk Songs)	I. Rudchenko	Russian Empire	1874	Chumak songs
Istoricheskie pesni malorusskogo naroda (Historical Songs of the Little Russian People, 2 vols)	Mykhailo Drahomanov, Volodymyr Antonovych	Russian Empire	1874–5	
Malorusskie narodnye predaniia i rasskazy (Little Russian Folk Legends and Tales)	Mykhailo Drahomanov	Russian Empire	in 1876	
Trudy etnografichesko-statisticheskoi ekspeditsii v Zapadno-russkii krai (Works of the Ethnographic-Statistical Expedition to the West-Russian Region, 7 vols)	Pavlo Chubinskyi	Russian Empire	Russian Empire, 1872–9	Vol.1 deals with folk beliefs, superstitions, proverbs, riddles, and spells; vol. 2 with folk tales and anecdotes; vol. 3 with the folk calendar, songs associated with spring rituals, harvest songs, and carols; vol. 4 with birth, baptism, wedding and funeral rites; vol. 5 with folk songs; vol. 6 with legal customs; and vol. 7 with the various peoples that lived in Ukraine
Narodnye pesni Galitskoi i Ugorskoi Rusi (Folk Songs of Galician and Hungarian Rus')	Yakiv Holovatskyi (between 1830–50)	Galicia and Transcarpathia, Austrian Empire	Moscow, in 1878 by Osyp Bodiansky	
Novi ukraïns’ki pisni pro hromads’ki spravy (Recent Ukrainian Songs on Social Topics)	Mykhailo Drahomanov	Russian Empire	1881	
Pokuttia	Oskar Kolberg	Pokuttia, Austro-Hungary	1882-89	
Politychni pisni ukraïns’koho narodu 18–19 st. (Political Songs of the Ukrainian People in the 18th and 19th Centuries)	Mykhailo Drahomanov	Russian Empire	2 vols, 1883–5	
Obiasneniia malorusskikh i srodnykh narodnykh pesen (Explanations of Little Russian and Related Folk Songs)	Oleksandr Potebnia	Russian Empire	Vol. 1, 1883; Vol. 1, 1887	
Khleb v obriadakh i pesniakh (Bread in [Folk] Rituals and Songs)	Mykola Sumtsov	Russian Empire	1885	
Narodnyi pisennyk z naikrashchykh ukraïns’kykh pisen’ (A Folk Songbook of the Best Ukrainian songs)	Volodymyr Aleksandrov	Russian Empire	1887	
Skazki, poslovitsy i t.p., zapisannye v Ekaterinoslavskoi i Khar'kovskoi guberniiakh (Tales, Proverbs, etc, Recorded in Katerynoslav and Kharkiv Gubernias)	Ivan Manzhura	Yekaterinoslav Gubernia (Steppe Ukraine) and Kharkov Gubernia (Sloboda region)	1890	
Malorusskaia etnografiia (Little Russian Ethnography)	Aleksandr Pypin	Russian Empire	1891, as Vol. 3 of his Istoriia russkoi etnografii (The History of Russian Ethnography)	
Sovremennaia malorusskaia etnografiia (Contemporary Little Russian Ethnography)	Mykola Sumtsov	Russian Empire	Vol.1, 1893; Vol. 2, 1897	synthesis of Ukrainian ethnography
Etnohrafichnyi zbirnyk (Ethnographic Collection)	Ethnographic Commission of the Shevchenko Scientific Society (NTSh) in Lemberg (including Ivan Franko, Volodymyr Hnatiuk, Stanislav Liudkevych)	mostly Galicia and Transcarpathia, Austro-Hungary	40 vols beginning in 1895	folk songs, carols, proverbs, and other materials in the field of ethnography collected mostly in Galicia and Transcarpathia
Halyts’ko-rus’ki narodni prypovidky (Galician-Ruthenian Folk Proverbs)	Ivan Franko	Austro-Hungary	as part of the Etnohrafichnyi zbirnyk	six-volume edition of Ukrainian proverbs
Etnograficheskie materialy, sobrannye v Chernigovskoi i sosednikh s nei guberniiakh (Ethnographic Materials Collected in the Chernihiv and Neighboring Gubernias)	Borys Hrinchenko	Chernigov Gubernia (Polesia/Severia) and neighboring Gubernias, Russian Empire	3 vols, 1895–9	
Etnohrafichni materiialy z Uhors’koï Rusy (Ethnographic Materials from Hungarian Ruthenia)	Volodymyr Hnatiuk	Transcarpathia, Austro-Hungary	1897–1911 in vols 3, 4, 9, 25, 29, and 30 of the Etnohrafichnyi zbirnyk	
Razyskaniia v oblasti anekdoticheskoi literatury (Research in the Field of Anecdotal Literature, 1898)	Mykola Sumtsov	Russian Empire	1898	
Rozvidky pro ukraïns'ku narodnu slovesnist' i pys'menstvo (Studies of Ukrainian Folklore and Literature, 4 vols, 1899–1907)	Mykhailo Drahomanov		1899-1907	
Materiialy do ukraïns’koï etnolohiï (Materials on Ukrainian Ethnology)	Ethnographic Commission of the NTSh in Lemberg	Austro-Hungary	1899-1916	
Iz ust naroda. Malorusskie rasskazy, skazki i proch. (From the Mouths of the People: Little Russian Stories, Tales, etc)	Borys Hrinchenko	Russian Empire	1900	

== 20th century ==
Collection	Collector(s)	Location	Published	Notable content
Literatura ukrainskogo fol’klora (1777–1900) (The Literature of Ukrainian Folklore [1777–1900])	Borys Hrinchenko	Russian Empire	1901	first bibliography of Ukrainian folklore
Ohliad ukraïns'ko-rus'koï narodnoï poeziï (A Survey of Ukrainian-Rus’ Folk Poetry)	Filaret Kolessa	Austro-Hungary	1905	
Malorusskie narodnye pesni (Little Russian Folk Songs)	Dmytro Yavornytskyi	Russian Empire	1906	
Malorossiiskaia i zaporozhskaia starina v pamiatnikakh ustnogo narodnogo tvorchestva (Little Russian and Zaporozhian Antiquity in the Monuments of Oral Folk Creativity).	Yakiv Novytskyi	Russian Empire	1907	
four volume Slovar ukraïns’koï movy (Dictionary of the Ukrainian Language)	Borys Hrinchenko, Panteleimon Kulish	Russian Empire	1907-09	ethnographic records and excerpts from literary works published mostly between 1798 and 1870
Halyts'ko-rus'ki narodni prypovidky (Galician-Ruthenian Folk Proverbs)	Ivan Franko	Austrian Empire	1908	
Malorossiiskie pesni (Little Russian Songs)	Nikolai Gogol	Russian Empire	1908 by G. Georgievsky	about 1,000 Ukrainian folk songs
Das Geschlechtsleben des Ukrainischen Bauernvolkes	Volodymyr Hnatiuk, P. Tarasevsky	Austro-Hungary	2 vols, 1909, 1912	
Melodiï ukraïns'kykh narodnykh dum (Melodies of Ukrainian Folk Dumas)	Filaret Kolessa	Austro-Hungary	2 vols, 1910, 1913	
Maliunky z zhyttia ukraïns'koho narodnoho slova (Sketches from the Life of Ukrainian Folk Oral Literature)	Mykola Sumtsov	Russian Empire	1910	
Variianty melodii ukraïns'kykh narodnykh dum, ïkh kharakterystyka i hrupuvannia (Variants of the Melodies of Ukrainian Folk Dumas, Their Characterization and Grouping)	Filaret Kolessa	Austro-Hungary	1913 in Zapysky Naukovoho tovarystva im. Shevchenka, 116–17	
Ukraïns’ka narodna slovesnist’ (Ukrainian Folk Literature)	Volodymyr Hnatiuk	Austro-Hungary	1916	presented a system for recording, classifying, and publishing Ukrainian folklore
Slobozhane: Istorychno-etnohrafichna rozvidka (The Slobidska Ukrainians: A Historico-Ethnographic Study, 1918)	Mykola Sumtsov	Sloboda region, Russian Empire, Ukrainian Peoples Republic or Ukrainian State	1918	
Materiialy do etnolohiï i antropolohiï (Materials on Ethnology and Anthropology)	Ethnographic Commission of the NTSh in Lemberg		1920-?	
Ukraïns’ki narodni melodiï (Ukrainian Folk Melodies)	Klyment Kvitka		Ukrainian SSR, 1922	over 700 melodies of various genres of Ukrainian folk songs
Etnohrafichnyi visnyk (Ethnographic Herald)	Ethnographic Commission of the All-Ukrainian Academy of Sciences (Etnohrafichna komisiia VUAN)		Kyiv, Ukrainian SSR, 10 vols, 1925–32	
Ukraïns’ki narodni dumy: Korpus (Ukrainian Folk Dumas: The Corpus)	Kateryna Hrushevska		Ukrainian SSR, 2 vols, 1927, 1931	
Kazky ta opovidannia z Podillia v zapysakh 1850–1860kh rr. (Folk Tales and Stories from Podilia Transcribed in the 1850s and 1860s)	Mykola Levchenko, Andrii Dyminsky and Stepan Rudansky	Podolia region, Russian Empire	Ukrainian SSR, 1928	
Narodni pisni z halyts'koï Lemkivshchyny’ (Folk Songs from the Galician Lemko Region)	Filaret Kolessa	Galician Lemko Region, Second Polish Republic	1929, in the Etnohrafichnyi zbirnyk, nos 39–40	
Bibliohrafiia literatury z ukraïns'koho folkl'oru (Bibliography of Ukrainian Folklore)	Oleksandr Andriievskyi		Ukrainian SSR, 1930	
Ukraïns’kyi fol’klor (Ukrainian Folklore)	Institute of Ukrainian Folklore of the Academy of Sciences of the Ukr SSR and the Office for the Arts at the Council of People's Commissars of the Ukr SSR		Kyiv, Ukrainian SSR, 1937–39	
Ukraïns'ka usna slovestnist (The Ukrainian Oral Literature)	Filaret Kolessa		1938; repr, 1983	
Zakarpats'ki narodni pisni (Transcarpathian Folk Songs)	Institute of Fine Arts, Folklore, and Ethnography of the Academy of Sciences of the Ukr SSR	Transcarpathia	Ukrainian SSR, 1962	
Bukovyns'ki narodni pisni (Bukovynian Folk Songs)	Institute of Fine Arts, Folklore, and Ethnography of the Academy of Sciences of the Ukr SSR	Bukovyna	Ukrainian SSR, 1963	
Koliadky ta shchedrivky (Christmas and Epiphany Carols)	Institute of Fine Arts, Folklore, and Ethnography of the Academy of Sciences of the Ukr SSR		Ukrainian SSR, 1965	Koliadky and Shchedrivky
Zhartivlyvi pisni rodynno-pobutovi (Humorous Family-Life Songs)	Institute of Fine Arts, Folklore, and Ethnography of the Academy of Sciences of the Ukr SSR		Ukrainian SSR, 1967	
Kolomyiky (Kolomyikas)	Institute of Fine Arts, Folklore, and Ethnography of the Academy of Sciences of the Ukr SSR	Western Ukraine	Ukrainian SSR, 1969	
Fol'klorystychni pratsi (Folkloristic Works)	Filaret Kolessa		Ukrainian SSR, 1970	
Tantsiuval'ni pisni (Dance Songs)	Institute of Fine Arts, Folklore, and Ethnography of the Academy of Sciences of the Ukr SSR		Ukrainian SSR, 1972	
Instrumental'na muzyka (Instrumental Music)	Institute of Fine Arts, Folklore, and Ethnography of the Academy of Sciences of the Ukr SSR		Ukrainian SSR, 1972	
Spivanky-khroniky (Song-Chronicles)	Institute of Fine Arts, Folklore, and Ethnography of the Academy of Sciences of the Ukr SSR		Ukrainian SSR, 1972	
Rekruts'ki ta soldats'ki pisni (Recruits’ and Soldiers’ Songs)	Institute of Fine Arts, Folklore, and Ethnography of the Academy of Sciences of the Ukr SSR		Ukrainian SSR, 1974	
Ukrain'ski narodni pisni v zapysakh Zoriana Dolenhy-Khodakovskoho (Ukrainian folk songs in the Transcriptions of Zorian Dołęga-Chodakowski)	Zorian Dołęga-Chodakowski (early 19th century)	Galicia, Volhynia, Podolia, Kyiv region and Poltava region (Dnieper Ukraine), Chernihiv region (Polissia/Severia), Russian Empire	Ukrainian SSR, 1974	
Naimyts'ki ta zarobitchans'ki pisni (Servants’ and Laborers’ Songs)	Institute of Fine Arts, Folklore, and Ethnography of the Academy of Sciences of the Ukr SSR		Ukrainian SSR, 1975	
Chumats'ki pisni (Chumak Songs)	Institute of Fine Arts, Folklore, and Ethnography of the Academy of Sciences of the Ukr SSR		Ukrainian SSR, 1976	
Kazky pro tvaryn (Animal Fables)	Institute of Fine Arts, Folklore, and Ethnography of the Academy of Sciences of the Ukr SSR		Ukrainian SSR, 1976	
Pisni literaturnoho pokhodzhennia (Songs of a Literary Origin)	Institute of Fine Arts, Folklore, and Ethnography of the Academy of Sciences of the Ukr SSR		Ukrainian SSR, 1978	
Ukraïnski narodni pisni v zapysakh Osypa ta Fedora Bodians’kykh (Ukrainian Folk Songs Transcribed by Osyp and Fedir Bodiansky)	Osyp Bodiansky and Fedir Bodiansky (19th century)	Russian Empire	Ukrainian SSR, 1978 by the Institute of Fine Arts, Folklore, and Ethnography of the Academy of Sciences of the Ukr SSR	
Bibliohrafiia ukrains’koho narodoznavstva (Bibliography of Ukrainian Folk Studies)	Myroslav Moroz		Lviv, Ukraine, 1999-	

== See also ==
- Ukrainian culture
- Ukrainian folklore
- Ukrainian folk music
- Ukrainian dance
- Ukrainian fairy tales
- Ukrainian wedding traditions
- Khlopomanstvo
- Ukrainophilism
- Ethnography
