= Russian folk song collections =

Russian folk song collections are anthologies compiled to preserve and study the tradition of Russian folk music.

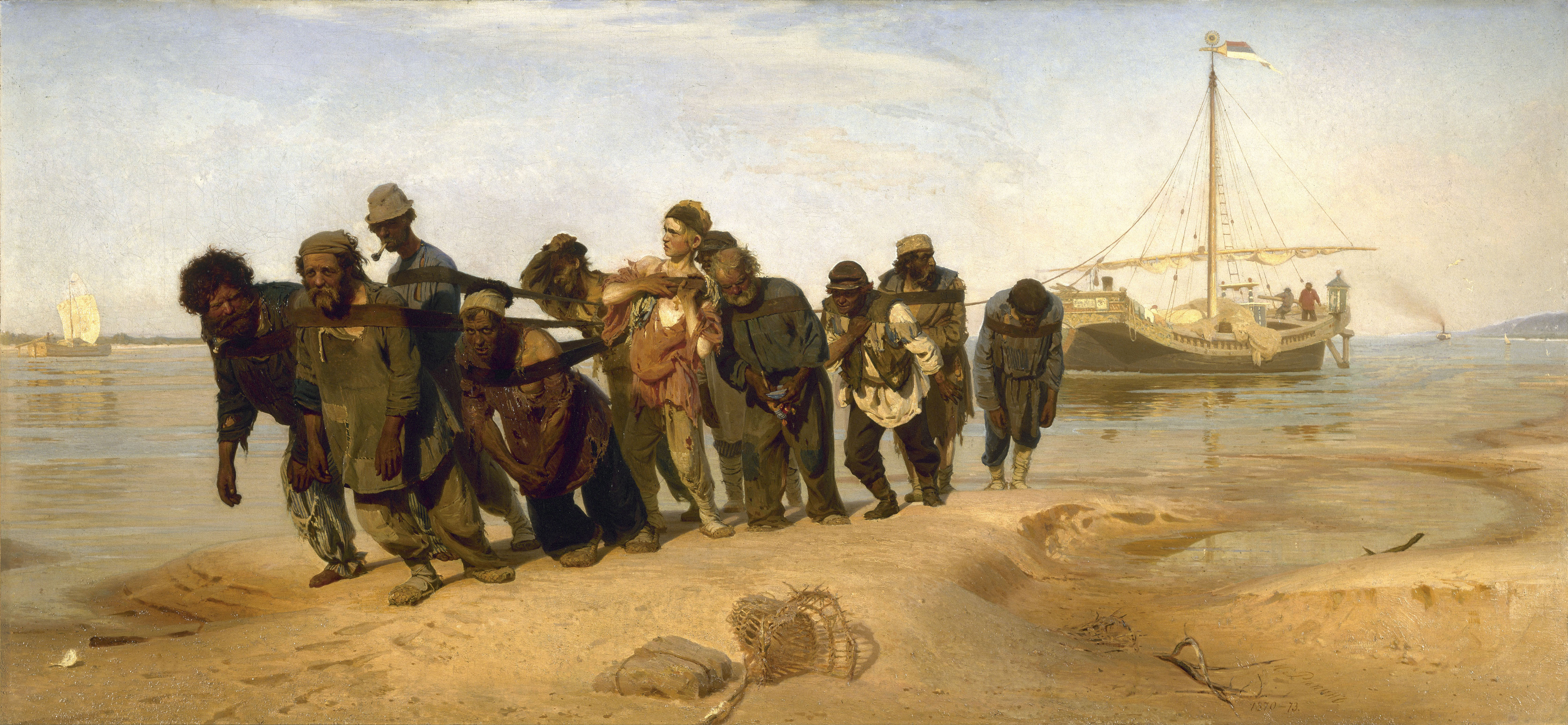
Barge Haulers on the Volga (1870–1873) of Ilya Repin

Ey, ukhnyem! (Эй, ухнем), sung by Feodor Chaliapin

== Introduction ==
Russian folk songs (народные песни, narodnye pesni) encompass a wide variety of styles, themes, and regional variations, including lyrical, epic, work, ritual, and dance songs. The systematic collection of Russian folk songs began in the 19th century, driven by ethnographers, composers, and folklorists who sought to document the nation’s cultural heritage. Important contributions to the collection and arrangement of folk songs are from the Russian composers Rimsky-Korsakov, Balakirev, Liadov and Lyapunov, and others.

Composers of the Mighty Handful (e.g., Balakirev, Rimsky-Korsakov) incorporated these folk motifs into their classical compositions, helping to popularize Russian folk music beyond its regional origins. Balakirev's collection (after a journey along the Volga from Nizhny-Novgorod to Astrakhan to record folk songs from the burlaks (barge haulers)) includes round dances, wedding songs, drawn-out lyrical songs, recruiting songs, and burlak songs. This edition became a model for the artistic arrangement of folk songs and served as thematic material for the compositions of many Russian composers.

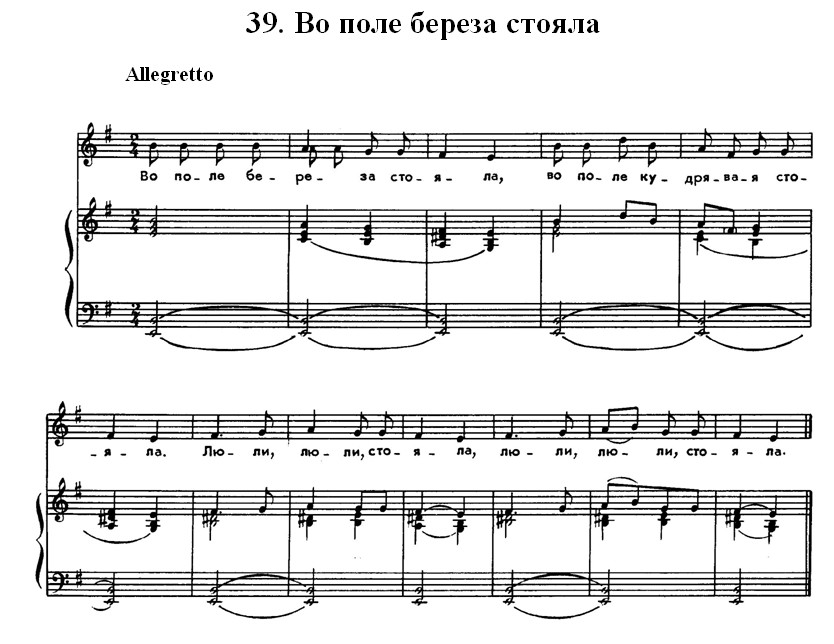
Vo pole bereza stoyala (Во поле берёза стояла), No. 39 from N. Rimsky-Korsakov: 100 Russian Folk Songs Op. 24 (1877)

Later ethnomusicologists continued cataloging and analyzing folk songs, ensuring their preservation for future generations.

These collections played a crucial role in preserving regional identities, influencing Russian classical and popular music, and promoting national pride. Today, many archives and museums maintain extensive repositories of recordings, transcriptions, and analyses of Russian folk songs.

A short overview gives the following list of collections (arranged alphabetically after the collectors/composers):

== List of Collections ==
- Mily Balakirev’s Sbornik russkikh narodnykh pesen Сборники русских народных песен (Collection of Russian folk songs), published in St. Petersburg in 1866, was one of the first major attempts to compile and arrange folk melodies for both scholarly and artistic purposes.
- P. I. Blaramberg (ru) arranged 12 russkikh pesen iz sbornika Melgunova (12 Russian songs from Melgunov’s collection), Moscow, 1888, setting them for voice.
- T. I. Filippov: 40 narodnykh pesen 40 народных песен (40 folk songs ), collected by T. I. Filippov and harmonized by N. A. Rimsky-Korsakov. Moscow: P. Jurgenson, 1882 (Сборник Филиппова—Римского-Корсакова - IMSLP).
- Aloiz Iedlichka (web) compiled Sobranie malorossiiskikh narodnykh pesen (Collection of Little-Russian folk songs), St. Petersburg, 1860, focusing on Ukrainian regional songs.
- P. V. Kireevsky, see P. I. Yakushkin.
- E. Lineva (de, ru) worked on Velikorusskie pesni v narodnoi gamonizatsii (Great-Russian songs in their folk harmonization), published between 1904 and 1909 (St. Petersburg, 1904-1909).
- Ukrainian composer Mykola Lysenko produced Zbimyk ukraiins'kikh pisen (Collection of Ukrainian songs), Kyiv and Odesa, 1890 and 1891, combining transcription and musical setting.
- N. M. Lopatin and B. P. Prokunin, with their Sbornik russkikh narodnykh liricheskikh pesen Сборник русских народных лирических песен (Collection of Russian folk lyric songs), Moscow, 1889.
- Nikolai Lvov and Ivan Prach, who compiled an early Collection of Russian folk songs [1790] in the late 18th century, reissued in 1987, ed. M. N. Brown, Ann Arbor.
- Iu. N. Melgunov (de, ru), whose Russkie pesni, neposredstvenno s golosov naroda zapisannye Русские песни, непосредственно с голосов народа записанные и с объяснениями (Russian songs, transcribed directly from the voices of the people and with explanations), volumes appeared in Moscow and St. Petersburg between 1879 and 1885.
- Nikolai Palchikov (ru), Collection.
- Ivan Prach, see Nikolai Lvov.
- B. P. Prokunin, see N. M. Lopatin.
- N. A. Rimsky-Korsakov, the composer and collector, who published a Sbornik russkikh narodnykh pesen Сборники русских народных песен (Collection of Russian folk songs) in two parts (St. Petersburg, 1876–1877). See also T. I. Filippov.
- A. Rubets (ru): Collection of Ukrainian folksongs (Сборник украинских народных песен). Compiled by A. Rubets. St. Petersburg, A. Cherkeso
- Pavel Rybnikov: The Songs Collected by P. N. Rybnikov (Песни собранные П. Н. Рыбниковым), published in 4 volumes in 1861—1867.
- Vasily Trutovsky, Collection of Russian rustic songs with music (Sobraniye russkikh prostïkh pesen s notami / Собрание русских простых песен с нотами) 1776
- K. Vilboa, who arranged Russkie narodnye pesni (Russian folk songs) for solo voice with piano accompaniment, published in St. Petersburg in 1860.
- P. I. Yakushkin published Pesni, sobrannye P. V. Kireevskim (Songs collected by P. V. Kireevsky), with recordings made by Yakushkin himself, showing the deepening ethnomusicological approach to folk material (Leningrad, 1986).

== Literature ==
- James Bailey (University of Wisconsin, Madison), Mikhail Lobanov (Russian Institute for the History of the Arts, RAN, St. Petersburg, Russia): Appendix I, in: Collection of Translations of Russian Folk Songs: E. E. Lineva's Visit to America (1892-1896). 1999 - Online version
- Iosif Dubovsky, Sergei V. Yevseev, Igor V. Sposobin, and Vladimir V. Sokolov (co-authored): Uchebnik garmonii [Harmony Textbook]. Moscow 1965 (Online)
- Adalyat Issiyeva: Representing Russia's Orient: From Ethnography to Art Song (AMS Studies in Music). 2020 – Appendix 1: Collections of Bylinas and Folk, Soldier, and Children’s Songs
