= Simeonov =

Simeonov (Bulgarian: Симеонов, Romanian: Simionov) is a Bulgarian masculine surname, its feminine counterpart is Simeonova or Simionova. It may refer to

- Albena Simeonova (born 1964), Bulgarian environmental activist
- Aleksandar Simeonov (disambiguation)
- Filipa Simeonova (born 1991), Bulgarian rhythmic gymnast
- Ivan Simeonov (1926–2018), Bulgarian sprint canoer
- Kaspar Simeonov (born 1955), Bulgarian volleyball player
- Mihail Simeonov (1929–2021), Bulgarian artist
- Nikola Simeonov (born 1939), Bulgarian Olympic marathon runner
- Simeon Simeonov (disambiguation)
- Svetlin Simeonov (born 1975), Bulgarian football midfielder
- Svilen Simeonov (born 1974), Bulgarian football player
- Todor Simeonov (born 1976), Bulgarian football player
- Valeri Simeonov (born 1955), Bulgarian politician
- Venceslav Simeonov (born 1977), Bulgarian-Italian volleyball player
- Zdravko Simeonov (born 1946), Bulgarian Olympic volleyball player
- Gheorghe Simionov (born 1950), Romanian sprint canoer
- Toma Simionov (born 1955), Romanian sprint canoer, brother of Gheorghe

== See also ==
- Simonov
