= Promyshlennaya Arkhitektura =

Promyshlennaya Arkhitectura
- Origin: Soviet Union
- Genres: Punk; Industrial
- Years active: 1988—1989
- Members: Dmitry Selivanov; Oleg Chekhovsky; Evgeny Skukovsky; Rinat Vakhidov; Igor Shchukin

Promyshlennaya Arkhitektura (Russian: Промышленная архитектура, Russian for Industrial Architecture) was a Soviet punk band from Novosibirsk that existed from 1988 to 1989. It was founded by Dmitry Selivanov and was disbanded shortly following his death.

== History ==
The band was founded in 1988 by Dmitry Selivanov a few weeks after his departure from Grazhdanskaya Oborona.

In 1988, the band recorded the album Любовь и технология (Love and Technology) at the Electron Student Club of NETI. That same year, the album was discovered by the organizers of the Syrok Moscow Rock Festival, who then invited the band to perform at the event. However, the show was disrupted because the sound was cut off.

After their failure in Moscow, the band returned to Novosibirsk and recorded their concert in the Palace of Culture of Railway Workers. This became the basis for their album “Live Архитектура”.

The group disbanded after the suicide of Dmitry Selivanov in April 1989. However, after his death, the members created a new group, Мужской танец (Men's dance).

== Reviews ==
Russian mathematician and music critic Misha Verbitsky:

...No attempt to create something utterly hopeless, dreary, or, in an irrepressibly faded black-and-white, bleak and desperate, can compare with the horror of ordinary human existence. Some sang of the diamond grass covering the sticky banks of the river called Death, while others settled on these banks—for existence is more hopeless than any death.

If we speak of Siberian punk of the 1980s as the music of suicide (and there is every reason to say so), then the work of the musician Selivanov takes on definitely demonic features—Selivanov embodied in a living body fantasies familiar to his comrades only in the frenzy of creativity and feverish delirium. If Grazhdanskaya Oborona and Instruktsiya po Vyzhivaniyu are suicidal rock, then Promyshlennaya Arkhitektura is post-suicidal.

Selivanov's photographs amaze with an otherworldly calm, detachment, essentially autism; Amidst the sea of Dionysian emotions revealed in the Grazhdanskaya Oborona concert, Selivanov towers like an indifferent cliff—and his guitar sounds like a counterpoint to the madness of perestroika enthusiasm—a lonely, autistic dissonance.

Promyshlennaya Arkhitektura, with a deadly cold electronic sound, drum machines, songs about the impending inevitable Holocaust, war and predestination – is experiencing a situation AFTER the collapse of human will and consciousness. Even the most optimistic listener of Promyshlennaya Arkhitektura will not find here joy or satisfaction – only cold, melancholy and hopelessness.

== Lineup ==
- Dmitry Selivanov — vocals, guitar, music, lyrics
- Oleg Chekhovsky — bass
- Evgeny Skukovsky — keyboards
- Renat Vakhidov — drums
- Igor Ivanovich Shchukin — drum machine

== Discography ==
- Любовь и технология (1988)
- Live Архитектура (1988)

== Music videos ==
- The Children of the Hospitals

== See also ==
- Zakrytoye Predpriyatiye
