= Dmitry Selivanov =

- Born: Dmitry Alekseevich Selivanov; Дмитрий Алексеевич Селиванов; 25 March 1964; Novosibirsk, USSR
- Died: 22 April 1989 (aged 25) Novosibirsk, USSR
- Genres: punk, post-punk, garage rock
- Occupations: vocalist, musician
- Instruments: Singing, guitar
- Years active: 1983–1989

Dmitry Alekseevich Selivanov (Russian: Дмитрий Алексеевич Селиванов, [ˈdmʲitrʲɪj ɐlʲɪkˈsʲeɪvʲɪtɕ sʲɪlʲɪˈvanɐf], 25 March 1964 – 22 April 1989) was a Soviet rock singer and guitarist from Novosibirsk. In the late 80s, was a member of Kalinov Most and Grazhdanskaya Oborona, then formed his own band in 1988, Promyshlennaya Arkhitektura, which lasted until his death.

== Biography ==
He first started playing music in 1979. He was a member of Grazhdanskaya Oborona and Kalinov Most and founded Industrial Architecture in June 1988.

On 22 April 1989, he visited the band A'MBE, who were rehearsing at Novosibirsk State Technical University. He said what turned out to be his last words, "Don't worry, there's more for me to do at the end of the corridor," before hanging himself from a nearby staircase. He was found dead 12 hours later. Selivanov's death is mentioned in the song "Tops and Roots" by Yegor Letov, which was released that same year; "The musician Selivanov hanged himself with a scarf".

A live cover of the Peter, Sue and Marc song "The Birds of Paradise", recorded in 1987 with Selivanov on vocals, was released on Kommunizm's final album, Chronicle of a Dive Bomber, in 1990.
