= Olga Glazova =

Russian singer (born 1993)

- Born: Olga Glazova; 26 November 1993 (age 32); Pskov, Russia
- Genres: Singer-songwriter, author song, ethnic Russian music, world music
- Occupations: guslyar (harpist), singer, composer and songwriter
- Instruments: vocal, piano, gusli, harp
- Years active: 1993–present
- Labels: "Far from Moscow", "Bomba-Piter inc., "Horizont Music»
- Website: vk.com/olgaglazovagusli/

Olga Gennadievna Glazova (Russian: Ольга Геннадьевна Глазова, born 26 November 1993 in Pskov) is a Russian singer-songwriter, composer and poet. She performed an academic repertoire of gusli and Russian folk songs in her own adaptation. Glazova is one of few performers who uses Russian folk instrument gusli and ancient harp to make repertoire prevailed by its own instrumental compositions and songs in Russian, English and other languages. Her first public performance took place in Pskov in 2001, during the international competition for young performers on folk multi-string instruments. By now she has been twice nominated for S. Kuryokhin award in the field of contemporary art – "Ethnomechanica – the best world music project", winner of about 30 international and national competitions of folk music, has published two solo albums of the harp music, and is engaged in restoration of lost equipment fingers playing the harp. Olga plays the custom 30-stringed harp crafted for her by A.Teplov. She cooperated with the notable Russian acts such as "Affinage (band)", "Theodor Bastard", "Sergey Nikolaevich Starostin", "Aquarium (band)". In 2020 she has collaborated with the Art of Peace global project, composed and arranged by Mehran Alirezaei.

== Concerts published on YouTube ==
- Live concert @ art-mansarde 4`33` (Saint-Petersburg) (, Saint-Petersburg, 2015
- Played in the Petrikirhe (Saint-Petersburg, Nevskiy 22–24), Saint-Petersburg, 2015
- Olga Glazova and Sergey Starostin, Concert – Olga Glazova & Sergey Starostin on YouTube and Concert of Olga Glazova and Sergei Starostin posted on the SoundCloud, 2016
- Concerts and interviews on TV: LifeNews 78 and Imagine Radio and Interview and on-line concert on Fresh Voice.

== Selected discography ==
- Songs on her own poetry
  - 2014 – "Water and wind 'first studio album. Author's music and lyrics (St. Petersburg, "Far from Moscow")
  - 2015 – "Six days of spring 'second studio album. Author's music and songs; Russian folk song "Where dear disappeared" (arr. O. Glazov) (St. Petersburg, "Bomba-Piter")
- Cooperations
  - 2015 – the participation in the recording of the album "Russian songs. Afterword" by "Affinage»
  - 2015 – the participation in the recording of the album "Vetvi" by "of Theodor Bastard"
  - 2016 – the participation in the recording of the album "Songs of unloved" by "Aquarium (band)»
