= Andrey Dobrov =

Kazakhstani businessman

- Добров Андрей Петрович
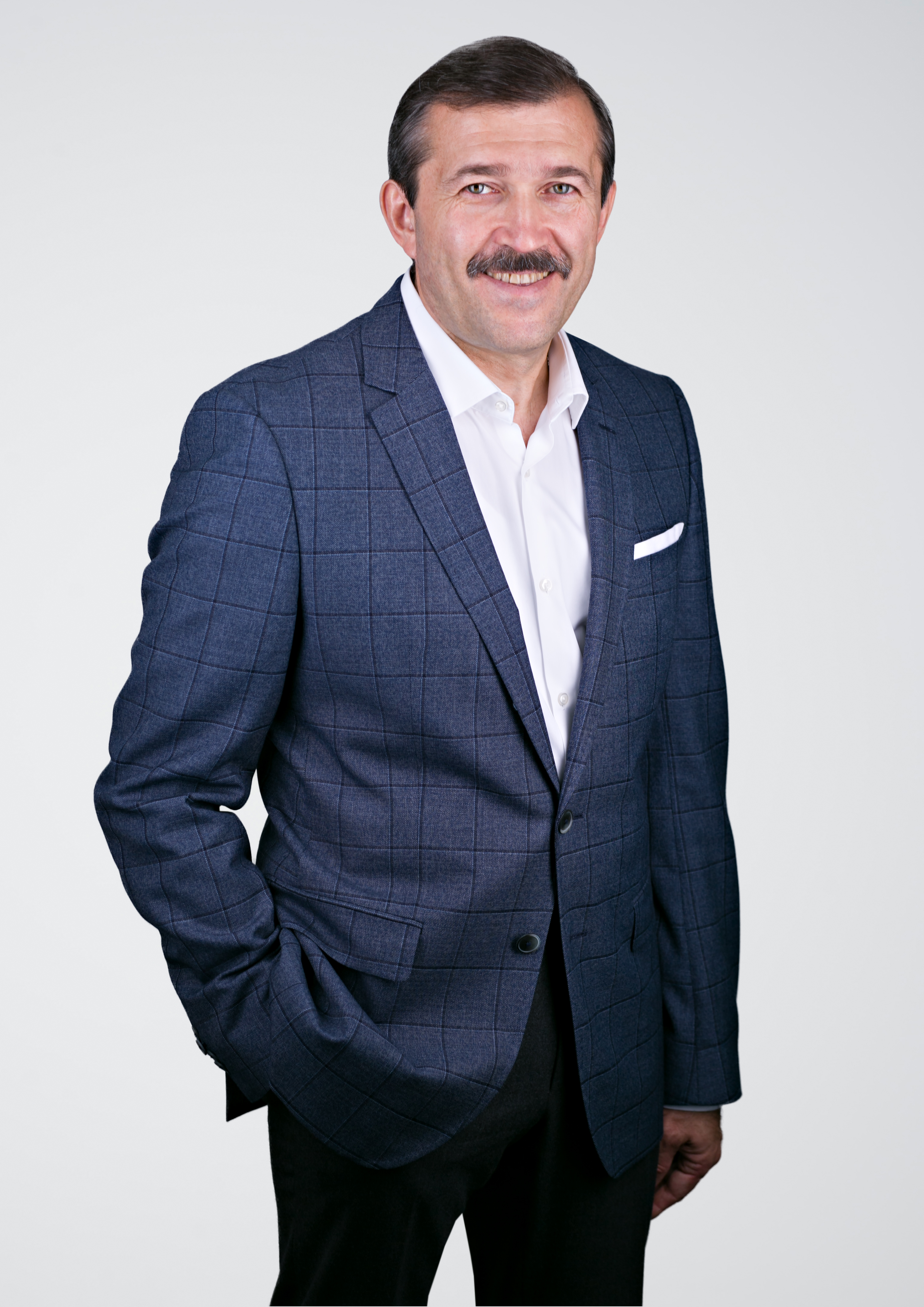
- Born: February 13, 1963 (age 63); Almaty, Kazakhstan
- Education: Novosibirsk State Technical University (1985), Higher School of Economics, Executive MBA (2005)
- Occupation: businessman
- Years active: 1991 - now
- Known for: russian coal mining industry pioneer
- Title: CEO of Belon Group; "Vzaimodeistvie" bank, chairman; "Russian steel", Member of the Supervisory Board
- Website: https://www.dobrovfamilygroup.com/

Andrey Dobrov is a businessman who has worked in the coal mining and banking industries. From 1991-2010, Dobrov was General Director of the Russian coal company Belon OJSC.

== Career ==
Dobrov's started his business with several video salons in Novosibirsk. Belon OJSC was founded in 1991. In 1998 he acquired the Belovskaya processing plant. In the early 2000s, coal mines were added to it. In 2002 Dobrov became a president of the Belon OJSC.

In 2006, Belon OJSC began to sell shares on the Russian stock market.

In 2008-2009, he sold 82.6% of the coal company Belon OJSC to the Magnitogorsk Iron and Steel Works for more than $500 million. In March 2009, he bought out more than 97% of shares of CB Belon LLC, and took over as chairman of the board of directors of CB Belon LLC. In 2010, he terminated his powers as General Director of OJSC Belon.

Since 2010, he has been engaged in the development of the bank, OOO KB "Vzaimodeistvie".

His net worth has been estimated to be $550M by Forbes, leading to a ranking of 162nd richest businessman in Russia in 2011, and then 182nd place in 2020.

In 2021, A. Dobrov acts as a beneficiary, a private investor and develops his company Dobrov & Family Group.

== Personal life ==
He is married and has three children.
