= Trutovsky =

Trutovsky is a Russian and Ukrainian surname. Notable people with the surname include:

- Kostyantyn Trutovsky (1826–1893), Russian-Ukrainian painter
- Vasily Fyodorovich Trutovsky (c.1740–c.1810), Ukrainian folk-song collector and composer
