= Nikolai Peiko =

Soviet and Russian composer (1916–1995)

Nikolai Ivanovich Peiko (Russian: Николай Иванович Пейко; 25 March 1916, Moscow – 1 July 1995, Moscow) was a Russian and Soviet composer and professor of composition.

== Early life ==
Peiko began his music education at the Academic Music College from 1933 through 1937 where his teachers included Igor Sposobin (harmony) and Genrik Litinsky (composition). This was followed by three years of training at the Moscow Conservatory where his teachers included Nikolai Myaskovsky (composition), Nikolai Rakov (orchestration), and Viktor Zukkerman (analysis). He graduated in 1940.

== Career ==
Peiko worked in a military hospital during World War II and taught at the Moscow Conservatory from 1942 to 1949. After working in the period 1941–1943 in Ufa at a military hospital, Peiko partly worked with and was influenced by Dmitri Shostakovich. From 1959 until retirement Peiko was professor of composition at the Gnessin State Musical College where his students included Sofia Gubaidulina, Alexander Arutiunian, and Inna Zhvanetskaya. Peiko taught his students twelve-tone technique.

Peiko's first successful work was From the Legends of Yakuta (1940). During World War II he composed several patriotic pieces, including Dramatic Overture (1941) and Symphony I (1944-1946). They were appreciated by Myaskovsky and Shostakovich. His compositions include Moldavian Suite for Orchestra (1950), Tsar Ivan's Night, Jeanne d'Arc, Ballada, for piano, Piano Sonata No.1, Variations for piano, Sonatina for piano No.2, Bylina, for Piano, Piano Sonata No. 2, and Concert Triptych for 2 pianos. Peiko worked on a genre of "pure" incidental music for theater plays.

Peiko was more than a traditional composer who absorbed folk music in his musical language. His music is known for a harsh, distant sound. His music has been described as driving march-rhythms with good humor, decorated with the sound of bells. In 1964 he was honored as an Honored Art Worker of the RSFSR. Peiko began working with 12-note scales in the 1960s.

== Recognition ==
Peiko won many awards, including two Stalin Prizes for his Symphony No. 1 (1947) and Moldavian Suite (1950–51).

== Selected works ==
- Piano Ballad (1939)
- From the Legends of Yakutia, symphonic suite (1940, rev. 1957)
- Dramatic Overture (1941)
- Sonatina-Folktale for Piano (1942)
- Aikhylu, opera (1942)
- Symphony No. 1 (1944–45)
- Symphony No. 2 (1946)
- Piano Concerto (1943–47)
- From the Early Russia, symphonic suite (1948)
- Moldavian Suite for orchestra (1949–50)
- Seven Pieces on Themes of the Soviet People (1950)
- Concerto-Fantasy for violin and orchestra No. 1 on Finnish themes (1953)
- Piano Sonata No. 1 (1946–54)
- Jeanne d'Arc, ballet after Schiller (1952–55)
- Symphonic Ballad (1956)
- Symphony No. 3 (1957)
- Sinfonietta (1959)
- Capriccio for chamber orchestra (1960)
- Piano Quintet (1961)
- String Quartet No. 1 (1962)
- Concerto-Fantasy for violin and orchestra No. 2 (1964)
- Symphony No. 4 (1963–65)
- String Quartet No. 2 (1965)
- One Night of Tsar Ivan, oratorio after Tolstoy (1968)
- Symphony No. 5 (1968)
- Suite for violin and orchestra (1968)
- Decimet (1971)
- Symphony No. 6 (1972)
- Concerto-Symphony (1974)
- Piano Sonata No. 2 (1975)
- String Quartet No. 3 (1976)
- Symphony No. 7 (1977)
- Elegiac Poem for strings (1980)
- One Night of Tsar Ivan, opera based in the 1968 oratorio (1982)
- Concert Variations for two pianos (1983)
- Symphony No. 8 (1985)

== Selected recordings ==
- Complete Piano Music. Toccata Classics (TOCC 0104 and 0105)
- Symphonies 4, 5 & 7. Melodiya LPs (1978, 1981).
- String Quartets. Shostakovich Quartet (Квартет имени Шостаковича) Melodiya LP 33 С 10—13037-8 (1979)
