= Violin Ensemble of Novosibirsk State Technical University =

The Violin Ensemble of Novosibirsk State Technical University (Russian: Ансамбль скрипичный Новосибирского государственного технического университета) is the official musical ensemble of violinists at the NSTU, located in Novosibirsk, Russia. It is currently under the direction of Mikhail Blam.

== History ==
In the 1960s, a chamber orchestra existed at the Novosibirsk Electrotechnical Institute, led by Yulian Notanovich Faktorovich. The first rehearsals took place in February 1970 and by 20 April the ensemble gave its first public performance. In 1975, the ensemble participated in a festival in Lviv, Ukraine, and since 1979, it has the title "People's" and gives annual concert in Novosibirsk Conservatory.
