= Treshchotka =

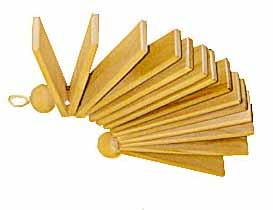
Treshchotka

A treshchotka (Russian: трещо́тка, IPA: [trʲɪˈɕːɵtkə] or treskotukha (трескотуха) is a Russian folk music idiophone percussion instrument which produces a clicking/cracking sound. It consists of a set of small boards somewhat loosely threaded by one end on a string or a pair of strings, with the ends sticking out, used to hold and rattle the instrument. The word itself generically denotes any device that makes a cracking sound (from the noun "треск", tresk).

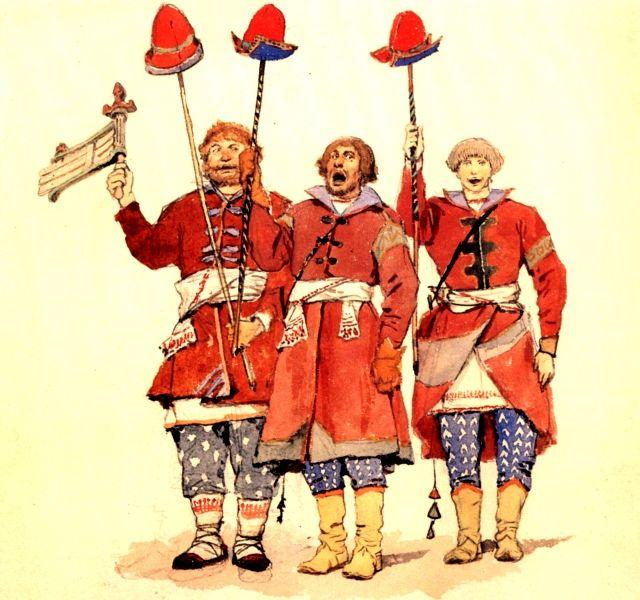
Biritches, by Viktor Vasnetsov. The leftmost biritch holds a ratchet-type treshchotka

In northwestern Russia the term treshchotka denotes a ratchet noisemaker, where a gearwheel on a handle rattles wooden planks in a rotating frame.
