= Affinage (band) =

Russian band (founded 2012)

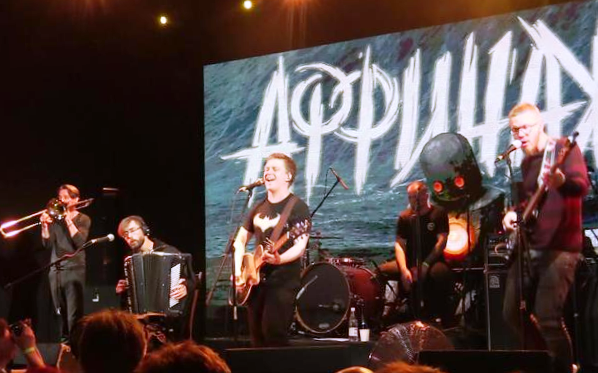
- Affinage in 2018 at the charity festival "Raznyye Lyudi – Rok-muzykanty pomogayut detyam" ("Different People – Rock musicians help children"), Saint Petersburg

Background information
- Origin: Russia
- Genres: noir-chanson, folk rock, acoustic rock, alternative rock
- Years active: 2012–present
- Members: Mikhail Em Kalinin; Aleksandr Sasha Om Yevdokimov; Sergei Sergeich Shiliaev; Aleksandr Koryukovets
- Website: affinageband.ru

Affinage (Russian: Аффинаж) is a Russian band founded in 2012 by songwriter and lead singer Mikhail Em Kalinin (Russian: Михаил "Эм" Калинин) and bass player Sergei Sergeich Shiliaev (Russian: Сергей "Сергеич" Шиляев) in the city of Saint Petersburg. The band plays songs in its own style of noir-chanson and takes its name from the process of purifying an impure metal (French: affinage).

Since its formation, the group released five studio albums, seven EPs, thirteen singles and one compilation. Affinage toured across Russia and Belarus, taken part in the popular Russian festivals (such as Nashestvie) and has songs on major music hit charts, and played on radio stations (e.g. Nashe Radio), without producers, labels or large sponsors.

== History ==
Mikhail Kalinin and Sergei Shiliaev met in Vologda in 2007. Sasha Om and Aleksandr Koryukovets became friends in Vologda. In 2011, Shiliaev and Kalinin moved to Saint Petersburg, where they tried to create an "ordinary rock band". After several months of unsuccessful musician searches, they decided to concentrate on music as an acoustic duo. They originally planned to be called Ya i Mobius yedem v Shampan' (Russian: Я и Мёбиус едем в Шампань), translated as I and Möbius are going to Champagne. The duo's first rehearsal was 13 March 2012. A few months later Kalinin and Shiliaev met with bayan player Aleksandr Koryukovets to form the trio Affinage.

Before the release of the debut mini-album the trio rehearsed and played live concerts. 21 September 2012 was the first performance of the group in the club "Baikonur" (Russian: "Байконур") in Saint Petersburg.

In the fall of 2012, the trio met with trombonist Aleksandr Sasha Om Yevdokimov, who joined the band.

Aleksandr Koryukovets and Sasha Om have musical educations and are professional musicians. Em and Sergeich haven't received a musical education (Em is a journalist, and Sergeich is a culturologist), however they studied music on their own.

== Style ==
The band's range includes light indie, pop-rock, and dark folk, but it keeps the face and its unique sound, considered an original and one of the most authentic in Russia. Layered powerful bayan, ornate bass lines, melodic trombone, acoustic guitar, vocals ranging from a gentle half-whisper to an emotional tear, general polyphony – sometimes the band sounds like a full-fledged orchestra.

Since the beginning of Affinage, its members have worked in the synthetic style of noir-chanson, which contains references to many genres of pop and rock music of the twentieth century including classical urban song (both Russian and Western European), 90's alternative rock, Russian rock tradition, Russian folklore, western dark folk and modern indie. In a 2018 interview, bassist Sergei Shiliaev said that the newly defined term noir-chanson was an attempt to separate from existing labels, and to have their own face musically and formally. At the same time music observers say that the band plays "acoustic rock with the addition of free folk, theatrical drama and the sophistication of rebellious arrangements, which is more characteristic of sparkling free jazz". According to Russian music critics, "if the rock was not born in England, but in Russia, it would probably soon become like Affinage plays it".

== Soundtrack ==
The musician, writer and member of Kino, Aleksei Rybin, used Affinage’s songs "Nravitsya" ("I like", Russian: "Нравится"), "Sodom i Gomorra" ("Sodom and Gomorrah", Russian: "Содом и Гоморра") and "Sasha" (Russian: "Саша") as a soundtrack for his debut full-length feature film "Skoro vso konchitsya" ("It will all be over soon", Russian: "Скоро всё кончится"). The film was in the main competition of the festival Kinotavr, and was awarded with the prize of the Rossiyskaya Gazeta in the online festival Double dv@. Rybin said that the songs used in the film are not random, but have a meaning and are perceived as "internal monologues of characters". The Affinage compositions attracted attention, according to Rybin, also because they don't use a rhythm section. Film critic Elena Stishova noted that "passages under the soundtrack cause associations with Balabanov's films".

== Band members ==
- Mikhail Em Kalinin – lyrics, lead vocal, guitar, ukulele
- Aleksandr Sasha Om Yevdokimov – trombone, backing vocal, percussion, guitar, keyboard
- Sergei Sergeich Shiliaev – bass, backing vocal
- Aleksandr Koryukovets – bayan, backing vocal, percussion

== Discography ==
=== Studio albums ===
Transliterated title	Original title	Translation	Year of release
Ya i Mobius yedem v Shampan'	Я и Мёбиус едем в Шампань	I and Möbius are going to Champagne	2014
Russkiye pesni	Русские песни	Russian Songs	2015
Russkiye pesni. Poslesloviye	Русские песни. Послесловие	Russian Songs. Afterword	2016
Sdelay more	Сделай море	Make the Sea	2017
Zoloto	Золото	Gold	2018
Mimo. Ranen. Ubit.	Мимо. Ранен. Убит.	Missed. Wounded. Killed.	2020

=== EPs ===
Transliterated title	Original title	Translation	Year of release
Affinage	Аффинаж	Affinage	2013
Deti	Дети	Children	2013
Letayu/Rastu	Летаю/Расту	I'm flying/I'm growing	2014
Mira	Мира	Mira or Peace to you!	2017
Ty, kotoryy nashol	Ты, который нашёл	You who found	2018
Komnata s lichnymi veshchami	Комната с личными вещами	Room With Personal Belongings	2018
Chudo	Чудо	Miracle	2018

=== Compilations ===
Transliterated title	Original title	Translation	Year of release
Luchsheye za 5 let	Лучшее за 5 лет	Best of 5 years	2017

=== Singles ===
Transliterated title	Original title	Translation	Year of release
Davay druzhit'	Давай дружить	Let's be friends	2014
Luchshe mne ne znat' o tebe nichego lishnego	Лучше мне не знать о тебе ничего лишнего	I'd rather not know about you too much	2014
Nravitsya	Нравится	I like	2014
Nike (Yeyo Kholodnyye Pal'tsy cover)	Нике (Её Холодные Пальцы cover)	Nike (Her Cold Fingers cover)	2015
Mechta (single version)	Мечта (single version)	Dream (single version)	2016
Sberegla (tribute Kalinov Most)	Сберегла (трибьют Калинов Мост)	You Saved (tribute Kalinov Most)	2016
Schast'ye	Счастье	Happiness	2016
Luchshe Vsekh	Лучше всех	Better than All	2018
Naprasnaya obida	Напрасная обида	Senseless Resentment	2018
Vdali	Вдали	Away	2018
Ni za chto ne skazhu tebe proshchay	Ни за что не скажу тебе прощай	I'll Never Say Goodbye To You	2019
New York — Moskva	Нью-Йорк — Москва	New York — Moscow	2019
Nepravda	Неправда	Untruth	2020
Kotik	Котик	Cat	2020
Angel	Ангел	Angel	2020

=== Featuring ===
Transliterated title	Original title	Translation	Year of release
Zalech' na dno v Avtovo (ekhoprokurennykhpodyezdov feat. Affinage)	Залечь на дно в Автово (эхопрокуренныхподъездов feat. Аффинаж)	To lay on the Bottom in Avtovo (ekhoprokurennykhpodyezdov feat. Affinage)	2016
Klyki (25/17 p. u. Affinage)	Клыки (25/17 п. у. Аффинаж)	Fangs (25/17 with Affinage)	2017
Moryak (25/17 p. u. Affinage)	Моряк (25/17 п. у. Аффинаж)	Sailor (25/17 with Affinage)	2017
Oshybki (Animaciya & Affinage)	Ошибки (АнимациЯ & Аффинаж)	Mistakes (Animaciya & Affinage)	2018

=== Covers ===
Transliterated title	Original title	Translation	Year of release
Sberegla (tribute Kalinov Most)	Сберегла (трибьют Калинов Мост)	You Saved (tribute Kalinov Most)	2016
Mozhesh' letet' (cover Animal Jazz, sbornik "Shag Vdokh. Tribute")	Можешь лететь (кавер Animal ДжаZ, сборник "Шаг Вдох. Трибьют")	You May Fly (Cover Animal Jazz, a compilation "Step Breath. Tribute")	2017
Otets (cover 25/17, sbornik "VSPOMNIT VSIO. Chast 4 (2). Kovry")	Отец (кавер 25/17, сборник "ВСПОМНИТЬ ВСЁ. Часть 4 (2). Ковры")	Father (cover 25/17, a compilation “REMEMBER EVERYTHING. Part 4 (2). Covers”)	2020

=== Videos ===
Transliterated title	Original title	Translation	Year of release
Affect	Аффект	Affect	2013
Sasha	Саша	Sasha	2013
Nravitsya	Нравится	I like	2015
Prygayu-Stoyu	Прыгаю-стою	I'm Jumping I'm Standing	2015
Mechta (single version)	Мечта (single version)	Dream (single version)	2016
Luchshe Vsekh	Лучше всех	Better than All	2018
Ni za chto ne skazhu tebe proshchay	Ни за что не скажу тебе прощай	I'll Never Say Goodbye To You	2019
New York	Нью-Йорк	New York	2019
