= Roman Matyushin =

Russian poet and singer-songwriter (1954–2026)

Roman Matyushin (Russian: Роман Матюшин, secular name Alexander Ivanovich Matyushin, (Note: In this name that follows East Slavic naming customs, the patronymic is Ivanovich and the family name is Matyushin.) Russian: Александр Иванович Матюшин, also known as hieromonk Roman (Russian: иеромонах Роман; 16 November 1954 – 19 May 2026) was a Russian poet, singer-songwriter and hieromonk of the Russian Orthodox Church.

== Life and career ==
Roman was born in Ryabchovsk village, Trubchevsky District, Bryansk Oblast, into a family of rural teachers. He graduated from the Philology Department at the Kalmyk State University, then worked as a school teacher. In 1983 he was tonsured monk in the Pskov-Caves Monastery. In 1985, he was ordained. He served in the parishes of the Bryansk Oblast and in Kiev Pechersk Lavra.

He began writing poetry in his youth. He published 19 books of poetry. He joined the Writers Union of Russia. Songs with Roman's lyrics are performed by Jeanne Bichevskaya, Oleg Pogudin, Sergei Bezrukov, Elena Vaenga, Maxim Troshin and others. According to Bezrukov, Roman did not recognize copyright and allowed free reuse of his work.

Roman died in Belgrade on 19 May 2026, at the age of 71.
