= Simonov =

Simonov (Russian: Си́монов), or Simonova (feminine; Си́монова), is a Russian surname. It is derived from the given name Simon and literally means Simon's. Notable people with the surname include:

- Andrey Simonov (born 1966), Russian major general
- Andrey Simonov (born 1971), Russian aviation historian
- Ivan Simonov (1794–1855), Russian astronomer
- Konstantin Simonov (1915–1979), Soviet poet, playwright, and novelist
- Kseniya Simonova (born 1985), Ukrainian artist
- Matvey Simonov (1823–1900) Ukrainian ethnographer, folklorist and writer
- Mikhail Simonov (1929–2011), Russian aircraft designer
- Mikhail Yuryevich Simonov (born 1959), Russian direct marketing pioneer and personified communications expert
- Nikolay Simonov (actor) (1901–1973), Soviet actor
- Ruben Simonov (1899–1968), Soviet actor and film director
- Sergei Gavrilovich Simonov (1894–1986), Soviet weapons designer
- Sergei Sergeyevich Simonov (born 1983), Russian footballer
- Vladimir Simonov (actor) (1957–2025), Soviet and Russian actor
- Vladimir Simonov (engineer) (1935–2020), Soviet and Russian engineer
- Yevgeniya Simonova (born 1955), Russian actress, People's Artist of Russia
- Yuri Simonov (born 1941), Russian conductor

== See also ==
- 2426 Simonov, asteroid
- Natalya Simonova, fictional character (and Bond girl) in GoldenEye
- Simonov Monastery, famous monastery in Moscow
- SKS, the most well known weapon designed by Sergei Simonov

== See also ==
- Semyonov (disambiguation)
