= Evgeniâ Lineva =

Russian musical ethnologist (1854–1919)

- Born: Evgenia Paprits; 9 January 1854; Brest-Litovsk
- Died: 24 January 1919 (aged 65); Moscow
- Known for: Folk song collecting

Evgeniâ Eduarovna Lineva (also spelled Evgeniia, Evgeniya or Eugenie, 1854–1919) was a Russian singer and folk-song collector known for her recordings of Russian and Ukrainian peasant songs. Trained as an opera singer, she formed a Russian choir to promote Russian music in America in the 1890s. She then travelled in Russia and Ukraine collecting phonograph recordings of folk songs, which she transcribed and published. Acknowledged as the earliest musical ethnographer in Russia, she preserved songs in their contexts which proved influential on later composers, especially Igor Stravinsky.

== Early life ==
She was born Evgeniâ Paprits in Brest-Litovsk on 9 January 1854, the daughter of the director of the Kiev Opera, where she sang. She was trained by Mikhail Glinka and at the Moscow Conservatory of Music. She performed as a contralto in Moscow, Budapest, Paris, London and Vienna, where she was promoted by Anton Rubenstein.

In 1889 she married the electrical engineer A. L. Linev, a political liberal who was in danger of arrest in Russia. They left the country and lived in London 1890–2, then moved to New York.

== American career ==
In the 1892, Lineva organised a choir of Russian and Ukrainian immigrants and gave performances of Russian folk music in New York. She gained funding from philanthropist Charles Crane to bring the performance to the 1893 International Exhibition in Chicago. (Note: When Livena attempted to return the money she had borrowed from Crane, he sent back twice the amount to the Russian Geographical Society, which granted it back to Lineva. She used the funds for her ethnomusicological journey to the Novgorod region in 1901. (Bailey 1999, pp. 24-5)) Under the French version of her name, Eugenie Lineff, she published a scholarly collection of translations of Russian wedding songs in 1893.

Lineva continued to show Russian music, plays and dances in New York in 1892–5 with the support of the New York Folk Lore Society and Louis C. Tiffany, saying that her aim was to 'serve the Russian Art and thus, indirectly, my country, because nothing—I think—unities Nations more closely than mutual sympathy in art and literature.'

== Folk song collection and publications ==
In 1896, Lineva and her husband were granted a reprieve by Nicholas II and returned to Russia. Using phonograph technology to which she had been introduced in America by fellow musicologist Henry Krehbiel, she travelled on ethnological excursions recording religious, secular and folk songs in central Russia (1897–1901), Ukraine (1903), the Caucasus (1910) and Austria-Hungary (1913). She is noted as the first person to record Russian peasant music with a phonograph, one of the earliest musical ethnographers in Russia and one of the first to adopt a scientific approach to music collecting.

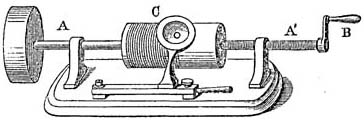
Diagram of a phonograph, showing the resin cylinder Livena refers to. Livena's cylinders were acquired by the USSR Acadmeny of Sciences.

Lineva described the process: ‘What had seemed impossible was now a fact. Songs, echoing somewhere in space—filling the fields, forests, and villages, unconquerable—could now be captured on the cylinder made of delicate resin…' She then approximated these songs in standard musical notation so that they could be published. These appeared in several landmark publications between 1904 and 1912, including the multi-volume Folk Songs of Great Russia. Her Folk Songs of the Ukraine was translated into English in 1958.

Lineva's work described 'the surroundings in which the song lives' including its cultural context and the behaviour of the performer, and also provided an analysis of technical elements such as part-singing, choral texture, voice leading, rhythmical freedom, and polyphonic singing. The influence of her collection on Stravinsky, who owned a copy of The Peasant Songs of Great Russia, has been noted.

From 1903, Lineva became secretary of the Musical-Ethnographical Commission, which organised concerts of peasant singers. In 1906, she was involved in the foundation of a Folk Conservatory in Moscow where she taught courses in folk music.

She died in Moscow on 24 January 1919.
