= Sergey Zayashnikov =

Sergey (Ivanovich) Zayashnikov
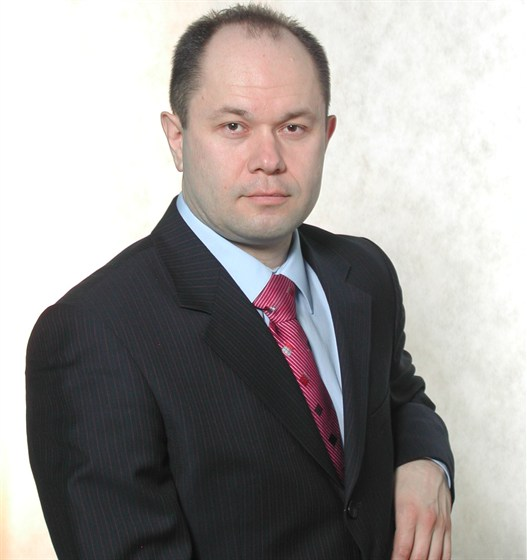
- Born: 19 October 1964 (age 61); Kuli, Chita Oblast
- Occupations: sports promoter, manager, TV producer, writer
- Website: rtbf.ru, http://ramtl.com

Sergey Ivanovich Zayashnikov (Russian: Серге́й Иванович Заяшников) is the President of the Russian Muay Thai League, martial arts writer, TV commentator, promoter, one of the founders of the Muay Thai in Russia. He is the author of the first book about karate in the USSR (Karate Technique, 1990), co-author of the first book about Russian hand combat in Russia (Russian-Style Hand to Hand Combat, 1991), co-author of the first book about Muay Thai in Russia (Thailand boxing, 1992).

== Biography ==
- Sergey Zayashnikov was born in Kuli, Chita Oblast, Russia on 19 October 1964.
- In 1986 he graduated from Novosibirsk State Technical University.
- In 1992 he founded Russian Muay Thai League (R.M.T.L.) (from 1992 to 1993 owner and sponsor, from 1993 to present time – the President of R.M.T.L.).
- In 1994 he sent R.M.T.L. team (4 boxers) to the First IFMA World Amateur Muay Thai Championship (Chonburi, Thailand). Three of them won gold, silver and bronze medals.
- In 1996 he gained recognition of the Muay Thai as an official sport in the Russian Government and Russian Olympic Committee. He founded Russian Thai Boxing Federation (R.T.B.F.) on the basis of the R.M.T.L., where he functioned as the RTBF vice-president until 2007.
- From 1996 to 2009 he was an announcer of the first Russian Muay Thai TV show, which broadcast weekly on Russian satellite channel NTV Plus Sport .
- In 2007 he organized Russia-USA Muay Thai Professional Tournament in Roseland Ballroom, New York for the first time, where in the next 3-year organized series of Muay Thai Tournaments, promoted by WBL Muay Thai.
- In 2014 "Forbes Russia" published an article named "The Rules of Fight", in which Sergey Zayashnikov' students told journalists about methodology and techniques of Sergey Zayashnikov trainings.
- In 2015 World Business Channel interviewed. Sergey Zayashnikov for the "PRO Sport" programme. During the interview Sergey talked about history and development of the Muay Thai in Russia.
- In 2016 5th edition of reference textbook «Muay Thai» was published on Kobo Writing Life, which included photos from extensive RMTL archive, which showed key moments of 25-th year history of Muay Thai in Russia.
- In 2018 free "RAMTL app" (Muay Thai, MMA, Karate) was published in Apple Store and Google Play on 16 languages.

== The published books list ==
- 1990 "Karate technique", compiler (Kaunas.50 000 copies)
- 1991 "Russian-Style Hand to Hand Combat", co-author (Novosibirsk.100 000 copies.)
- 1992 "Thailand boxing", co-author (Novosibirsk. ISBN 5-900176-03-7. 30 000 copies.)
- 1994 "Thaiboxing (Muay Thai)" (Novosibirsk. 1 000 copies)
- 1996 "Thaiboxing (Muay Thai)", 2-d ed.(Novosibirsk. 1 000 copies)
- 2002 Textbook "Thaiboxing (Muay Thai)" 3-d ed.(Moscow. ISBN 5-93127-190-2. 4 000 copies.)
- 2004 Textbook "Thaiboxing (Muay Thai)" 4-d ed.(Moscow. ISBN 5-93127-251-8. 4 000 copies.)
- 2006 Textbook for physical education universities "Thaiboxing (Muay Thai)", co-author (Moscow. ISBN 5-94299-075-1. 1 000 copies)
- 2016 Reference book «Muay Thai» 5-d ed., corr. and exp. (Electronic version on Kobo Writing Life)
- 2020 Interactive textbook "Encyclopedia of fight. Muay Thai. Fightbook" (Moscow: "OntoPrint". ISBN 978-5-00121-257-7. Hardcover, color print. 500 copies)
