= Zhanna Bichevskaya =

Russian musician (born 1944)

Zhanna Bichevskaya Жанна Бичевская
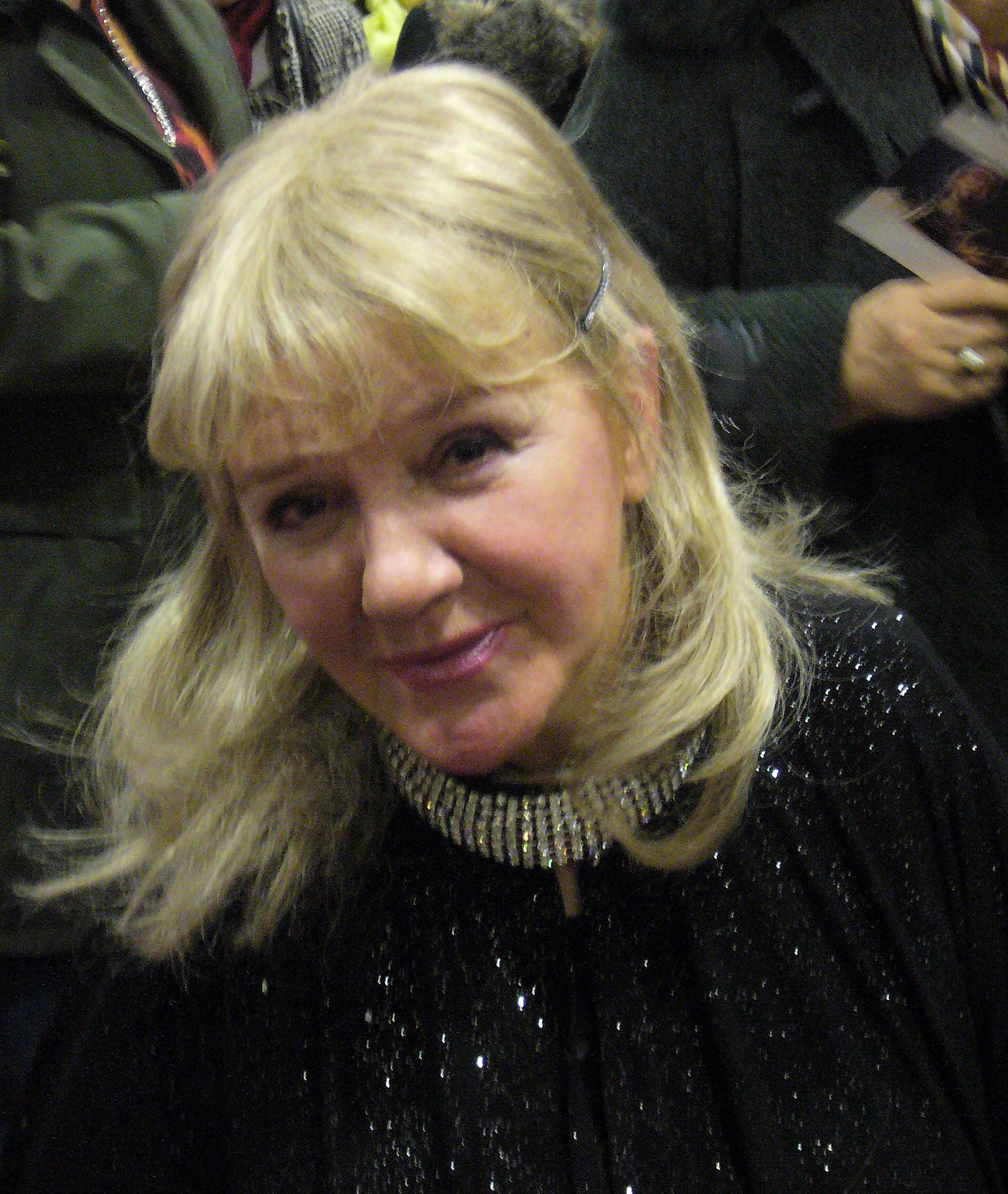
- Zhanna Bichevskaya in 2009

Background information
- Also known as: Jeanne Bichevskaya
- Born: Zhanna Vladimirovna Bichevskaya (Жанна Владимировна Бичевская); 17 June 1944 (age 81); Moscow, Soviet Union
- Origin: Zagorsk
- Genres: Folk
- Occupation: Singer
- Instruments: Vocals, guitar
- Years active: 1971-current
- Website: http://www.zhanna-bichevskaya.ru/

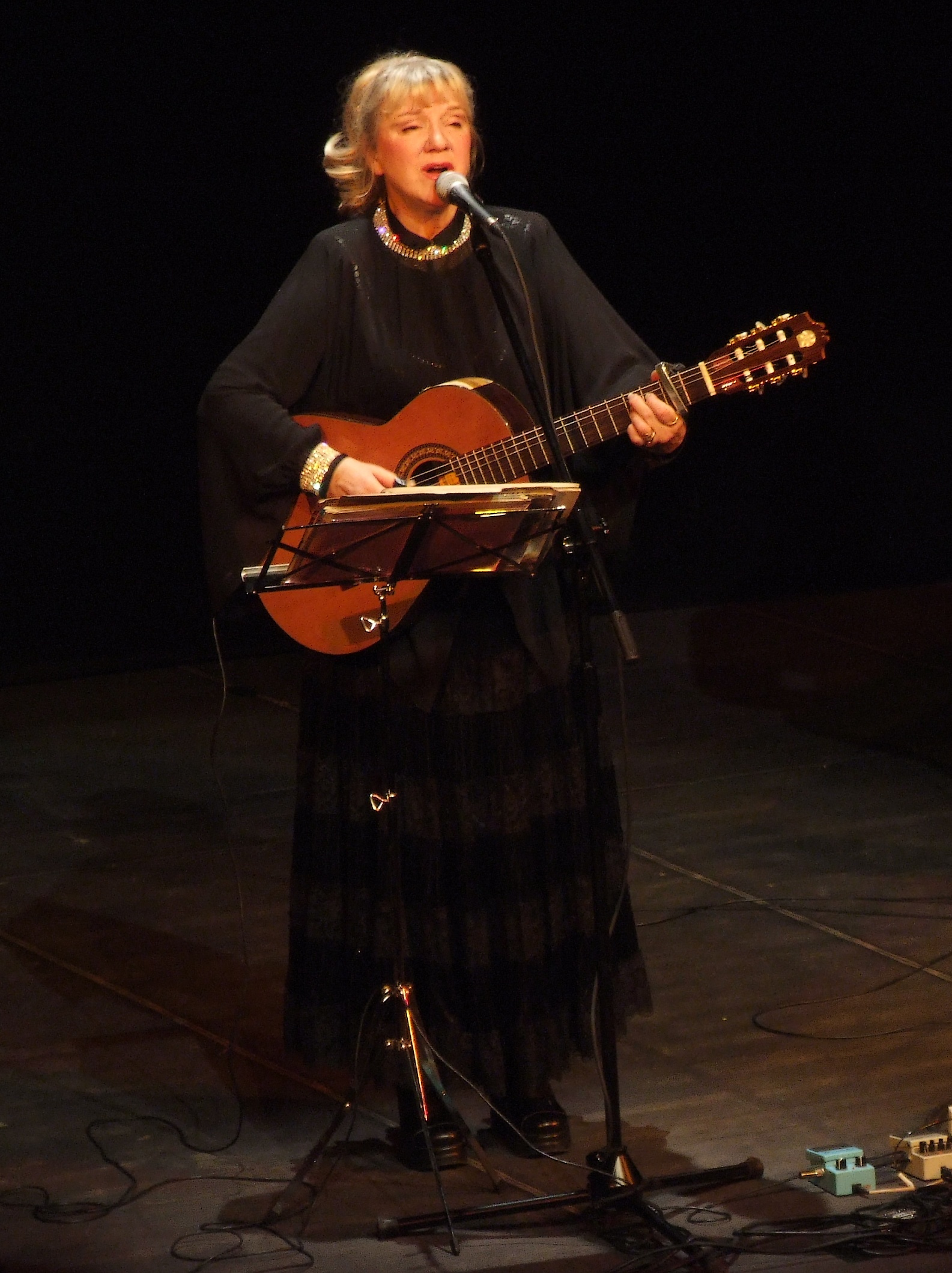
At a concert in 2006

Zhanna Vladimirovna Bichevskaya (Russian: Жанна Владимировна Бичевская; English: Jeanne Bichevskaya; born June 17, 1944) is a Russian singer and folk musician.

She was born in Moscow. In 1971 she graduated from the Moscow Circus and Performing Arts School. She was a teacher of music in Zagorsk (Sergiev Posad). In the 1970s, Zhanna started to perform Russian folk songs and romances.

At that time she was influenced by Bulat Okudzhava, and she gained popularity in Russia and abroad with some critics dubbing her the Russian Joan Baez. Her unique style of music is described as Russian country-folk.

In the late 1980s and early 1990s, Zhanna Bichevskaya's songs began to have more political, nationalist and spiritual themes. She performed a series of White Guard officer's songs, as well as a series of patriotic, monarchist and religious songs, some dedicated to the Romanov Holy Martyrs. The lyrics to the latter were composed by Father Roman, a priest of the Pskovo-Pechorsky Monastery. Her album "Hieromonk Roman's songs" was blessed by him in 1997.

In 1999, Zhanna also became the host of her own show on Voice of Russia radio station. She was awarded People’s Artist of the RSFSR.

== Discography ==
- Link to selected CDs
- Господа офицеры: 1994
- Life is too short, Слишком короток век: 1997, link to CD
- Songs of Bulat Okudzhava, link to CD
- Great, brothers, great... Любо, братцы, любо…: 1997, Link to CD
- Songs of Hieromonk Roman, 1997, Link to CD
- Жанна Бичевская поёт песни: 1997
- To Your Name, Lord: 1998
- Autumn of musician: 1998
- Русская Голгофа: 1998
- Russian folk songs and ballads: disk 1, disk 2, disk 3, disk 4: 1998
- Жанна Бичевская поёт песни Булата Окуджавы : 1999
- Tzar Nikolai: 1999
- Верую: 2000
- We are Russians, Songs of Gennadiy Ponomarev: 2001
- Black Raven Black Raven: 2002
- Боже, храни своих: 2003
- К-141: 2004
- Белая ночь. Жанна Бичевская поёт песни: 2005
- Я расскажу тебе... Романсы: 2007
- Гори, гори, моя звезда: 2008
- Засуха: 2010
