= Kalenyk Sheikovskyi =

Ukrainian linguist and ethnographer

- Native name: Каленик Шейковський

Kalenyk Vasyliovych Sheikovskyi (Ukrainian: Кале́ник Васи́льович Шейко́вський, 1835–1903, Menzelinsk, Ufa Governorate) was a Ukrainian linguist, ethnographer, publisher, teacher.

Sheikovsky's main work was to be his "Experience of the South Russian Dictionary", which was to oppose dictionaries that contained "angular" words, and be a dictionary of living language in its dialectal diversity, including ethnographic materials, proper names, various dictionary forms. The first issue (A - bull) was published in 1861. Due to the persecution of the Ukrainian press and personal wanderings, as well as the fire that destroyed the collected material, only issue 1 and 2 of volume 5 (T - barn, 1884, 1886) was published.

== Publications ==
- Быт подолян. — К., 1860. — Выпуск 1. — 71 с.; — Выпуск 2. — 74 с.(рос. дореф.)
- Опытъ южнорусскаго словаря. Томъ первый: А—З. Выпускъ первый: А—Б. — 1861.(рос. дореф.)
- Опытъ южно-русскаго словаря. Труд К. В. Шейковскаго. Том V. Т—Ю. Выпуск 1-й. — Москва: Типография: Э. Лесснер и Ю. Роман, 1883.(рос. дореф.)
- О похоронах в Подольской губернии // Киевский телеграф. — 1860. — No. 17, 18, 24–26.(рос. дореф.)
- О приветствиях и поздравлениях у подолян // Киевский курьер. — 1862. — No. 5, 8.(рос. дореф.)
- Шейковский К. В. Быт подолян. Т. 1, вып. 1 / соч., изд. К. Шейковского. — Киев: В тип. И. и А. Давиденко, 1859. — VI, 71, 4 с.(рос. дореф.)

== Literature ==
- Шейковський Каленик // Енциклопедія українознавства : Словникова частина : [в 11 т.] / Наукове товариство імені Шевченка ; гол. ред. проф., д-р Володимир Кубійович. — Париж—Нью-Йорк : Молоде життя, 1984. — Т. Кн. 2, [т. 10] : Хмельницький Борис — Яцків. — С. 3836–3837.
- Шейковський Каленик Васильович // Українська Радянська Енциклопедія. — 2-е видання. — Т. 12. — С. 394.
- Гончаренко Семен. Український педагогічний словник. — К. : Либідь, 1997. — С. 363.
- Баженов Л. В. Поділля в працях дослідників і краєзнавців XIX—XX ст. Історіографія. Біобібліографія. Матеріали. — Кам'янець-Подільський, 1993. — С. 398.
- Баженов Л. В. Історичне краєзнавство Правобережної України XIX — на початку XX ст.: Становлення. Історіографія. Біобібліографія — Хмельницький, 1995. — С. 243—244.
- Мацько В. Літературне Поділля. — Хмельницький, 1991. — С. 73.
- Поділля: Історико-етнографічне дослідження. — К., 1994. — С. 17—18, 20.
- Дубинка П. Полум'яний пропагандист: Наші славетні // Прапор Жовтня. — 1979. — 9 червня. — С. 4.
- Сваричевський А. Перше друковане видання, присвячене фольклору та етнографії Поділля // Проблеми етнографії Поділля: Тези доповідей наукової конференції. — Кам'янець-Подільський, 1986. — С. 185—186.
- Шевченко Л. Каленик Шейковський — дослідник мови та побуту подолян // Духовні витоки Поділля: Творці історії краю: Матеріали міжнародної науково-практичної конференції (9—11 вересня 1994 р., м. Кам'янець-Подільський). — Хмельницький: Поділля, 1994. — С. 91—93.
- Шеремета Н. Подвижницька діяльність Каленика Шейковського // Духовні витоки Поділля: Творці історії краю: Матеріали міжнародної науково-практичної конференції (9—11 вересня 1994 р., м. Кам'янець-Подільський). — Хмельницький: Поділля, 1994. — С. 93—95.
- <i id="mw0Q">Сваричевський Анатолій</i>. Етнограф і фольклорист // Подільські вісті. — 1995. — 21 грудня. — С. 4.
- Заславський І. Каленик Шейковський (1935 — 1903) — талановитий український просвітитель // Українська мова та література. — 1997. — Число 3. — С. 7.
- Шевчук В. Із вершин та низин. — К.: Дніпро, 1990. — С. 36.
- Завальнюк О. М., Комарніцький О. Б., Стецюк В. Б. Минуле і сучасне Кам'янця-Подільського. — Випуск 2. — Кам'янець-Подільський, 2007. — С. 184—189.
- Шалак О. І. Фольклористичні дослідження Каленика Шейковського: Тематика та едицій.
- Шаркань В. Графіка і правопис східноукраїнських підручників 1857–1863 років.
