= Viktor Frayonov =

Russian music educator

Viktor Pavlovich Frayonov (Russian: Виктор Павлович Фраёнов) (24 October 1930, Moscow – 4 September 2002, Moscow) was an outstanding music theorist and teacher. From 1956 to 2002 he was a professor of the musical college at the Moscow Conservatory.
