= Simeon Simeonov =

Simeon Simeonov may refer to

- Simeon Simeonov (footballer, born 1946) (1946–2000), Bulgarian football goalkeeper
- Simeon Simeonov (footballer, born 1983), Bulgarian football midfielder
