= Igor Sposobin =

Russian musicologist (1900–1954)

Igor Vladimirovich Sposobin (Russian: Игорь Владимирович Способин; 3 May 1900 – 31 August 1954) was a Soviet musicologist and musical educator.

== Biography ==
Sposobin was born in Moscow. He graduated from the Moscow Conservatory, where he was a student of Georgi Conus, Reinhold Glière, and Sergei Vasilenko.

Since 1924 teacher of music theory at the Moscow Conservatory (since 1939 Professor in 1943-48 - Head of the Department of Music Theory). Among his students included Boris Tchaikovsky, German Galynin, Viktor Frayonov, Yuri Kholopov, and Yury Saulsky.

Author of textbooks on harmony, analysis forms, elementary music theory, ear training manuals on.

The school taught music theory subjects in the 1930s-1940s. During World War II, he headed the theoretical department.

He died in Moscow at the age of 54, and was buried in the Vvedenskoye Cemetery.

== Awards ==
- Order of the Red Banner of Labour (28 December 1946)
