= Russian folk music =

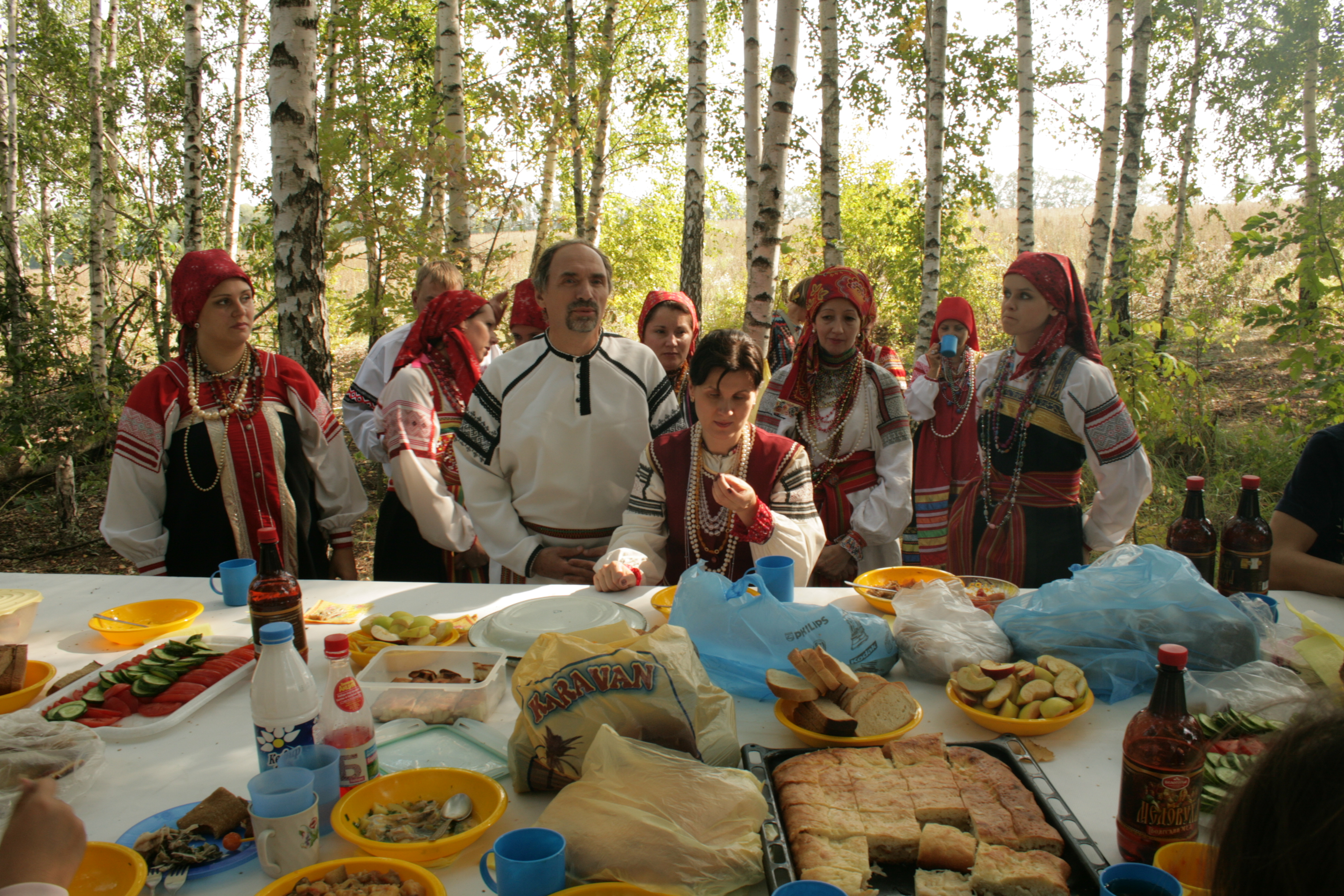
Russian folk choir of the eco-settlement "Korenskiye Rodniki"

Russian folk music specifically deals with the folk music traditions of the ethnic Russian people. Russian folk music is used as the basic foundation for the creation of all Russian professional music.

== Ethnic styles in the modern era ==
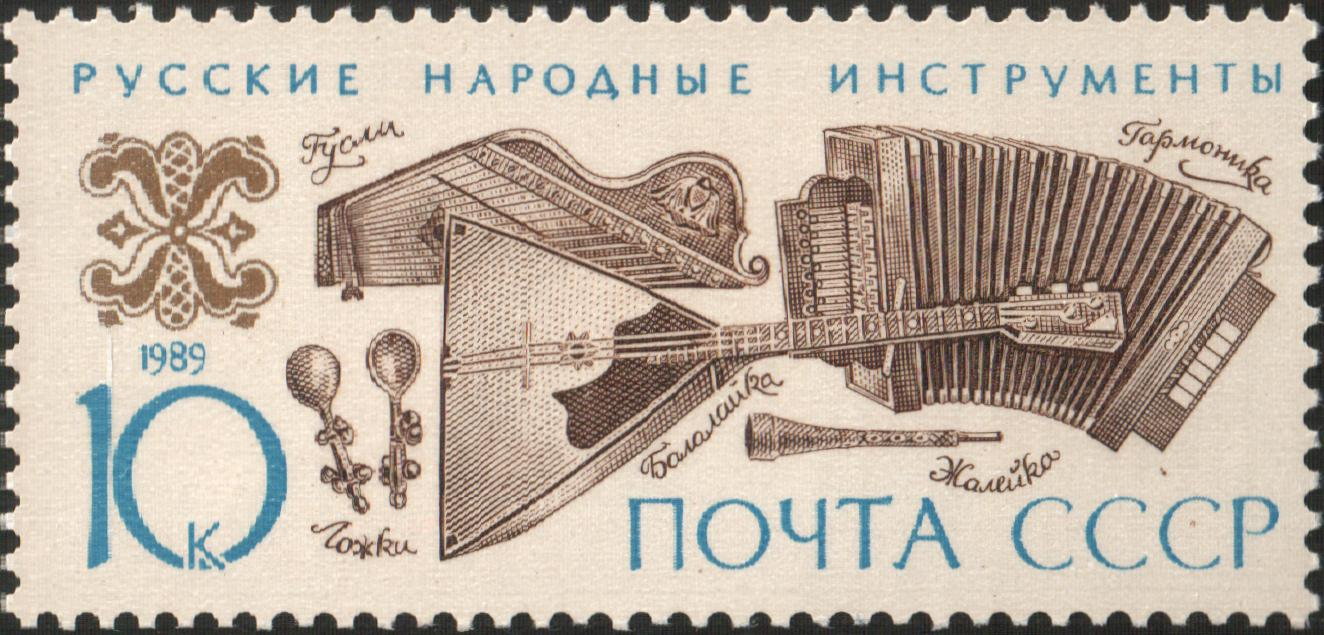
Soviet postage stamp depicting traditional Russian musical instruments.

The performance and promulgation of ethnic music in Russia has a long tradition. Initially it was intertwined with various forms of art music, however, in the late 19th century it began to take on a life of its own with the rise in popularity of folkloric ensembles, such as the folk choir movement led by Mitrofan Pyatnitsky and the Russian folk instrument movement pioneered by Vasily Andreyev, helped by the creation of Russian folk song collections.

In Soviet Russia, folk music was categorized as being democratic (of the people) or proletarian (of the working class) as opposed to art music, which was often regarded as being bourgeois. After the revolution, along with proletarian "mass music" (music for the proletarian masses) it received significant support from the state. In post-World War II Russia, proletarian mass music however lost its appeal, whereas folkloric music continued to have a widespread support among the population, inside and outside of the Soviet Union. However, the authentic nature of folk music was severely distorted by the drive to "professionalise" performers, regardless of the genre they worked in; thus, all folk singers were obliged to learn both Western-style classical notation and to perform classical repertoire—or else risk losing their right to perform as "professionals".

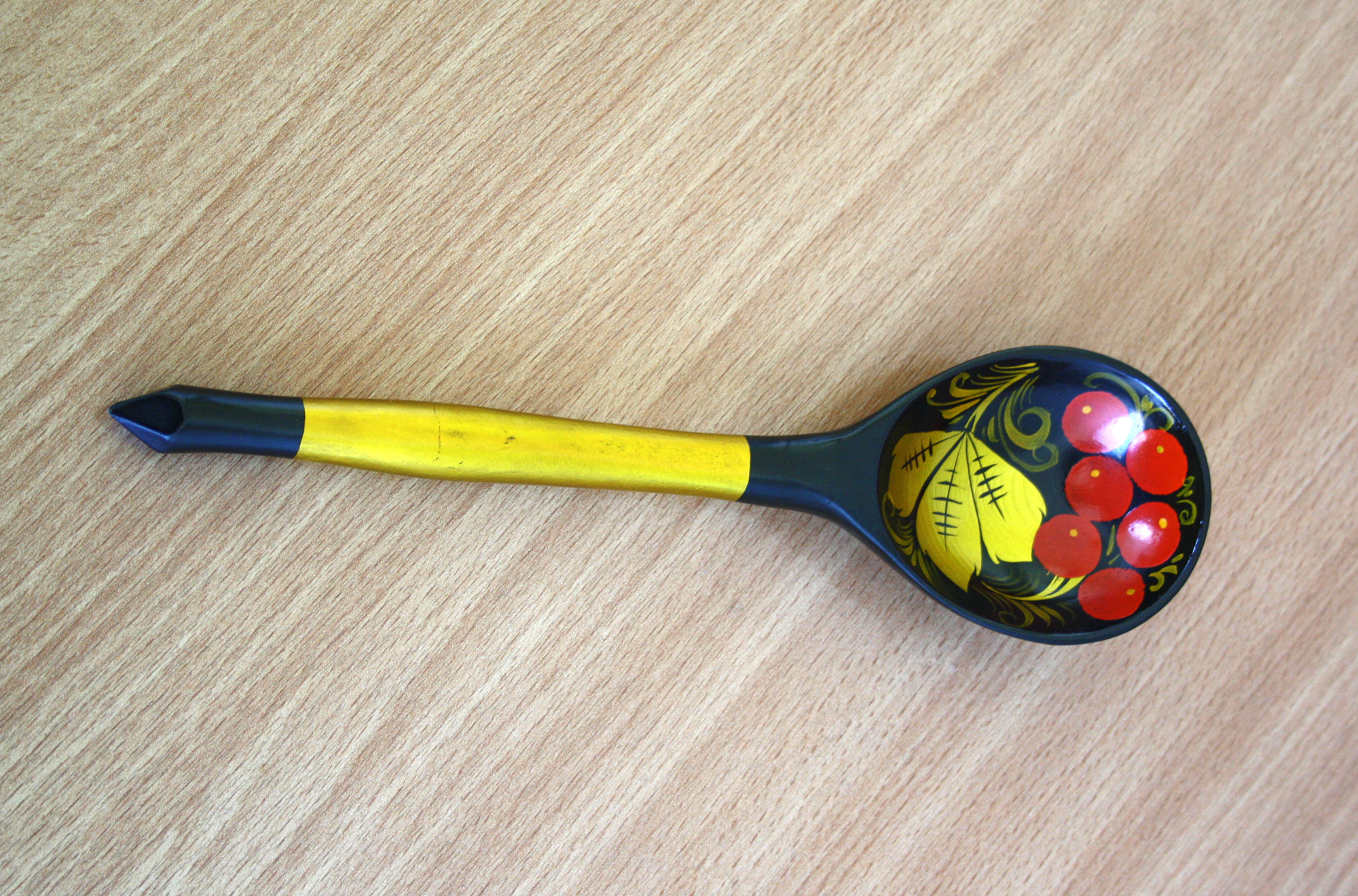
Russian spoons are used for traditional folk music in Russia (Watch performance with traditional Russian spoons on YouTube)

In the 1960s, folk music in Russia continued to receive significant state support and was often seen as the antithesis of Western pop music. The fact that numerous Soviet folkloric ensembles were invited for foreign tours raised the prestige of the folk performer to that of academic musicians, and in some cases even higher because access to the West and Western goods was very desirable.

Ethnic (folk) music in Russia can often be categorized according to the amount of authenticity in the performance: truly authentic folk music (reproductive performances of traditional music), folkloric and "fakeloric" performance.

Russia is a multi-ethnic country with some 300 different ethnic groups, many of them non-Slavic, living within its borders. This article deals specifically with just Russian ethnic music.

=== Authentic folk music ===
This music is closely tied in with village life and traditions. It was usually not performed by professional musicians. From the Central Committee's resolution of 1932, which prescribed musical literacy (in parallel to the drive to industrialise the Soviet Union), there has been a marked decline in authentic folk performance practice. Festivals, competitions and the work of ethnomusicologists have made attempts at preserving what has survived. In recent times there has been a movement by musicologists to study and reproduce authentic folk music in an authentic performance style on the concert stage. This movement in Russia is spearheaded by members of the faculty of folk music at the Moscow Conservatory under the direction of Dmitri Pokrovsky. More recently, Russian folk songs with strong religious (spiritual) components have been performed by singers like Zhanna Bichevskaya, Olga Arefieva and Elena Frolova

=== Folkloric music ===
This category includes music by groups led by music professionals, past and present, who have taken authentic musical material, and then arranged and performed it in a manner formulated by Vasily Andreyev and subsequently refined under Stalin's regime, yet widely accepted as 'authentically Russian' by Western audiences (conditioned, for instance, by performances by the Red Army Song and Dance Ensemble). The category includes many of the regional folkloric ensembles and dance companies popular in the Russian Federation. Often these folkloric ensembles specialize in collecting and maintaining the folk music traditions of the area of their origins which they service. They perform in stylized stage costumes based on the authentic costume designs used in the village but modified for stage use. Most inauthentic – but widespread – was the practice of performing so-called Cossack prisiadki (low-squatting dances) in perfect synchronization; as Professor Laura J. Olson observes, 'this situation did not reflect actual Cossack traditions so much as it borrowed from the traditions of Russian ballet that dated to the late nineteenth century'.

=== Artistic folklore music ===
This includes music composed by city intelligentsia and professional composers in a folkloric manner.

Much of the music of the Russian folk instrument orchestras can also be categorized in this group as it is based on academic music traditions and playing techniques only taking a folk element as its inspiration.

As in all western folklore traditions, the distinction is difficult to draw, as in the 19th century, intellectuals would both collect folk music (not always being accurate about their source material) and conflate it with original compositions.

In recent times music professionals who have completed diplomas in noted conservatories performing on Russian folk instruments are now questioning their "folkiness" when they perform, as none of their music was ever really performed originally by the (village) folk. Some now refer to their music as being academic folk music which to many academic musicians is an oxymoron.

== Vocal music ==
Authentic Russian folk music is primarily vocal. Russian folk song was an integral part of daily village life. It was sung from morning to night, and reflected the four seasons and significant events in villagers' lives. Its roots are in the Orthodox church services where significant parts are sung. Most of the population was also illiterate and poverty-stricken, so musical instruments were rare, and notation (which is more relevant for instrumentals than vocals) could not be read.

Authentic village singing differs from academic singing styles. It is usually done using just the chest register and is often called "white sound" or "white" voice. It is often described as controlled screaming or shouting. Female chest register singers have only a low diapason of one octave to 12 notes.

Chest register singing has evolved into a style used by many of Russia's folk choirs and neighbouring countries. It was pioneered by Pyatnitsky and Ukrainian folk choir director Demutsky in the early 1900s.

Notable ensembles include the Pyatnitsky Russian Folk Chorus, the Northern Russian Folk Chorus, the Omsk State Russian Folk Chorus, Beloe Zlato, the Alexandrov Song and Dance Ensemble of the Soviet Army and the Moscow Military Area Song and Dance Ensemble.

=== Recurring elements in singing ===
The "Ahy luli luli lui” or "Ohy loli loli loi" phrase is characteristic for Russian folk songs and is sung by women.

Whistling is very common in Russian folk songs as well a exclamation of high note.

The exclamation "Opa", also "Op op" and sometimes "Ota" is also a common characteristic of Russian folk music and is used by female and male singers.

Also, various exclamations of the Cossacks are represented in many Russian folk songs.

== Instrumental music ==
Instrumental music for a long period was suppressed in Russia. In 1648, Tsar Alexis I of Russia banned the use of certain musical instruments. It is believed that this decision was made primarily due to the nature of the music played by the Skomoroki. Their performances often featured lyrics and themes that were considered obscene and immoral, which led to widespread disapproval from the Orthodox Church. The Church, concerned about the influence of such music on the public, took steps to convince the Tsar to impose a ban. As a result, all performances by the Skomoroki were prohibited, and their musical instruments were banned as well.

The Church viewed many musical instruments as a moral threat, particularly those associated with folk traditions, which it saw as spiritually corrupt or destabilizing.

By targeting these instruments and their performances, the Orthodox Church aimed to maintain religious and moral order. This effort was politically motivated as well, with the Church closely aligning itself with secular authorities and their agendas. By leveraging the power of the state to suppress what it deemed as immoral or inappropriate music, the Church sought to control cultural expression and reinforce its influence over Russian society.

In the late 19th century, Vasily Andreyev, while studying violin in St. Petersburg, encountered a farmer playing the balalaika. Andreyev asked Antonov, a woodworker, to craft a balalaika with five frets. He began playing the balalaika solo and approached a St. Petersburg violin maker, Vladimir Ivanov, to improve the instrument. Ivanov at first declined, but agreed after Andreyev played the balalaika for him. By 1886, the first concert balalaika was complete.

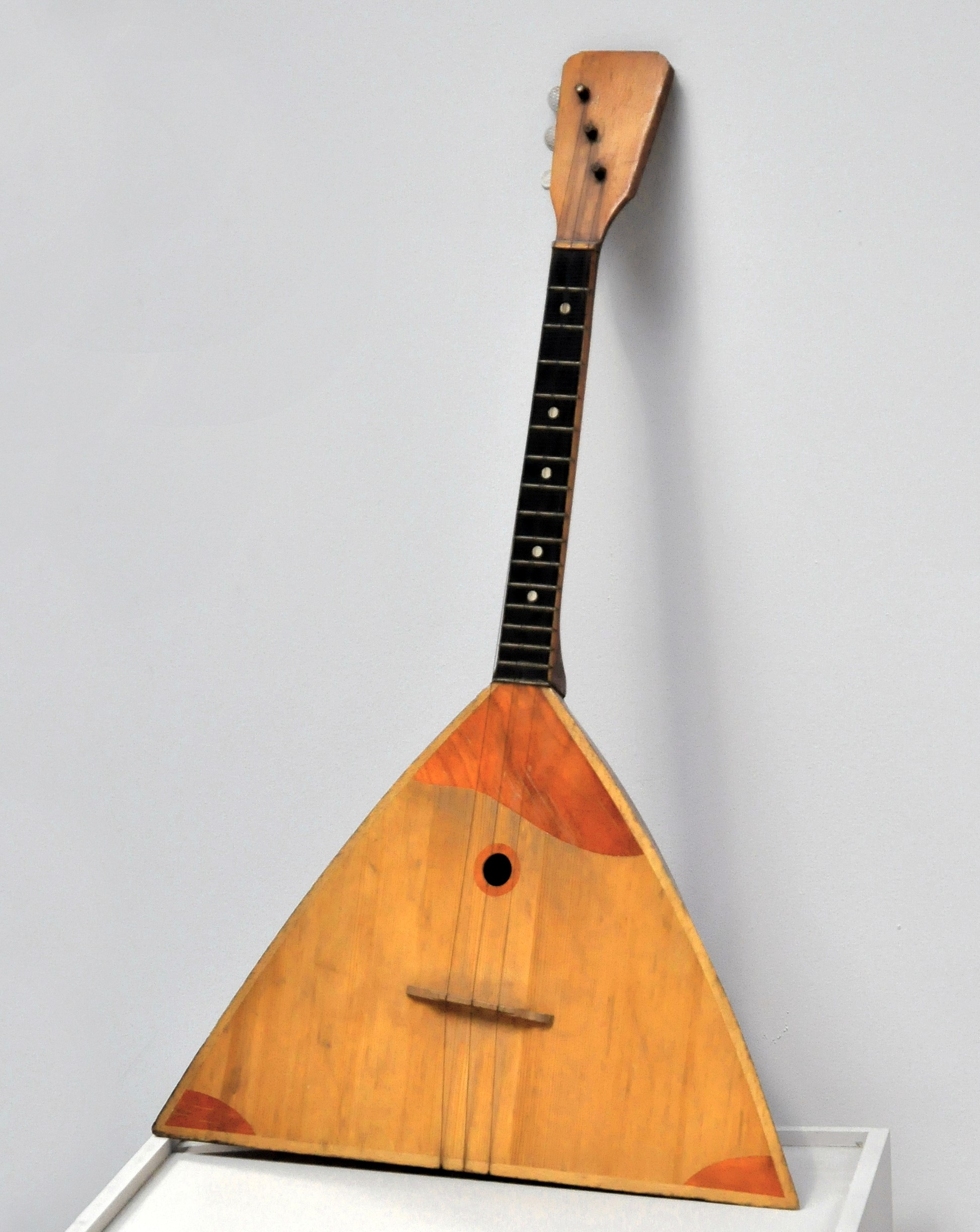
Balalaika

At first, Andreyev played the instrument in private salons. In the winter of 1886, he began giving public performances, introducing the balalaika to a wider audience.

Andreyev then formed an ensemble built around the balalaika, with instruments in a range of sizes from soprano to bass. The ensemble gave its debut concert in 1888 and was later expanded into the Imperial Russian Balalaika Orchestra.

== Traditional instruments ==
=== Chordophones ===
- Balalaika, a three-stringed, triangular sound-board, played with the fingers. It comes in many different sizes, prima being the most common. Two of the strings are tuned alike in descant, prima, secunda, and alto balalaikas.
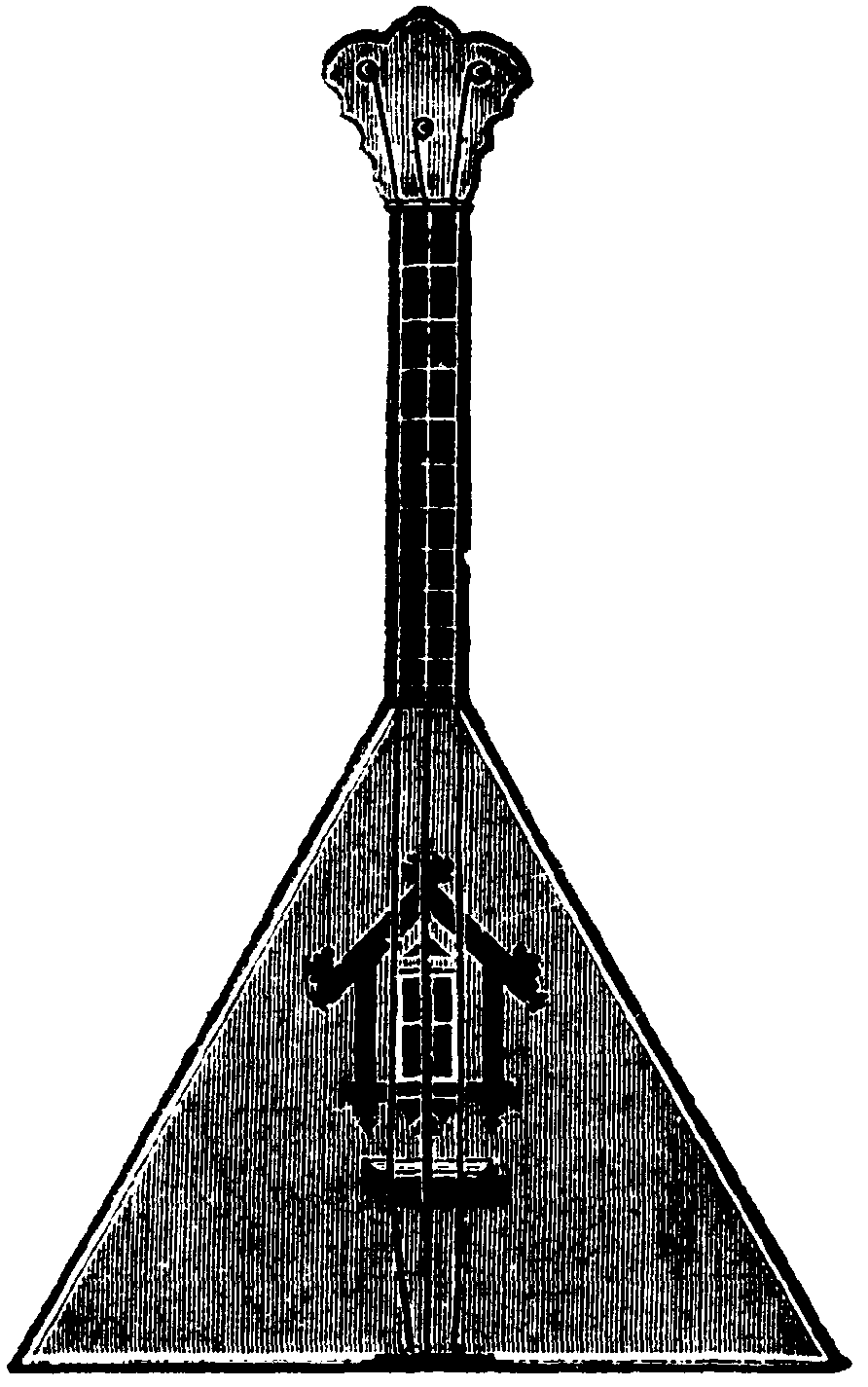
  Balalaika
- Domra, a small three- or four-stringed Russian variant of the mandolin with a rounded soundboard, plucked or strummed with a plectrum. It is also made in various orchestral sizes. Originally they were all three-stringed (E-A-D). The four-string variety was developed by in the early 20th century and became popular in Ukraine.
- Gudok (also hudok), a three-stringed, pear-shaped Russian bowed instrument tuned in fifths which is usually held vertically.
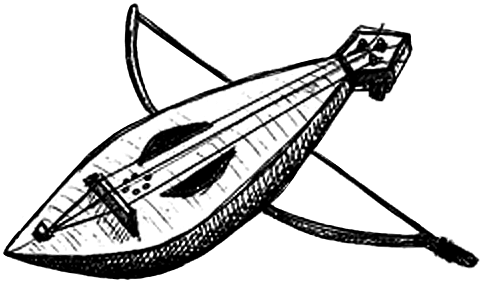
  Gudok
- Gusli, one of the oldest known Eastern Slav musical instruments, described by the Greeks as early as the 6th century AD. Many different varieties of this plucked string instrument exist.
- Kolyosnaya lira (Wheeled Lyre), a Russian version of the hurdy-gurdy usually made with a violoncello body.
- Semistrunnaya gitara (Semistrunka, Russian guitar), a seven string version of the acoustic guitar with its own preferred method of construction and unique open G major tuning.

=== Aerophones ===
- Bayan, a chromatic button accordion
- Garmon, a kind of diatonic Russian button accordion, featuring a unique unisonoric design
- Kalyuki (Russian: Калюки), a hollow pipe with no additional air holes, used for whistling sounds
- Kugikli/Kuvikly (Russian: Куги́клы (куви́клы)), simple panpipes
- Svirel, a Russian flute
- Vladimirsky rozhok, a type of horn made in Russia's Vladimir Oblast by shepherds who composed melodious calls on it. It has a range of two octaves and a very distinctive idiosyncratic sound.
- Volynka, a traditional Slavic bagpipe
- Zhaleika, a Russian folk clarinet/hornpipe

=== Idiophones ===
- Buben, an equivalent of the tambourine
- Bubentsy (Russian: бубенцы)
- Vargan, an equivalent of the jew's harp
- korobochka, an equivalent of the wood block
- Derevaynnie Lozhki, an equivalent of spoons
- Rubel, an equivalent of the washboard
- Treshchotka, an equivalent of the clapper

== Soviet era and folk music ==
During Stalin’s rule, music in the Soviet Union was controlled by the government. Leaders believed music should support their political ideas and help shape the way people thought. They wanted music to be easy to understand, positive, and supportive of the country. Music that was too experimental or influenced by the West was seen as dangerous. A group called the Russian Association of Proletarian Musicians (RAPM) worked to keep music in line with these ideas. Composers such as Dmitri Shostakovich were criticized if their music didn’t follow the rules.

Folk music was also affected. The government said it supported folk traditions, but only the parts that matched its message. Traditional folk songs were often altered. Regional styles and religious parts were removed, and songs were rewritten to make them sound more patriotic or simple. Folk groups performed these new versions at events and on radio, but they no longer sounded like the original music from villages.

Even with these changes, many folk musicians continued to perform by adjusting to the new system. They added classical instruments, changed lyrics, and worked with government-approved groups. This helped them keep parts of their tradition alive, even if the music was not completely true to its roots.

During this period, folk music became a mix of traditional material and state-approved performance, losing some of its original character.

== Contemporary Russian folk revival ==
Festivals and the internet have contributed to a revival of the Russian folk tradition. One example is the Novgorod festival, held during City Day, which features folk performances of traditional music, songs and dances.

Platforms such as YouTube have also made Russian folk music widely available, with groups such as Yat-Kha (rock with throat singing), and NARECHIE (contemporary folk).

== See also ==
- Sergey Nikolaevich Starostin
- Ivan Kupala (band)
- Pelageya
- Zhanna Bichevskaya
- Olga Glazova
- Oleg Gazmanov
- Music of Russia
