= Aleksandar Simeonov =

Aleksandar Simeonov may refer to:

- Aleksandar Simeonov (bobsleigh) (born 1963), Bulgarian bobsledder
- Aleksandar Simeonov (volleyball) (born 1986), Bulgarian volleyball player
