= Zakrytoye Predpriyatiye =

Russian New Wave band

- Origin: Soviet Union
- Genres: New wave
- Years active: 1986—1994
- Members: Arkady Golovin; Nikolay Dizendorf; Andrey Barkov; Igor Oleshkevich; Sergey Exuziyan; Galina Klimkovich; Alexander Zhukovsky; Renat Vakhidov

Zakrytoye Predpriyatiye (Russian: Закрытое предприятие) was a new wave band from Novosibirsk, Russia, that existed from 1986 to 1994.

== History ==
=== 1980s ===
The group was founded in 1986. The first line-up was Arkady Golovin, Andrey Barkov and Nikolay Dizendorf. And in the same year, the band started working on their first album, Komendatura. During recording, the drum parts were recorded using a drum machine.

In December 1986, the band was joined Igor Oleshkevich but in the summer he left them. In 1988, the group completed the second album Konstruktsiya. But their clip I owe no one (Я никому не должен) was banned due to censorship.

=== 1990s ===
By 1992–1993, the band members were losing interest in their musical creativity.

== Discography ==
=== Singles ===
- 1986 – Сонный пляж

=== Studio albums ===
- 1987 – Комендатура
- 1988 – Инфляция
- 1988 – Конструкция
- 1989 – Лето в Вашингтоне
- 1990 – ЗП
- 1993 – Сборник ЗП

== Music videos ==
- Я никому не должен
