= Kalinov Most =

Russian folk rock band

Kalinov Most (Калинов Мост)
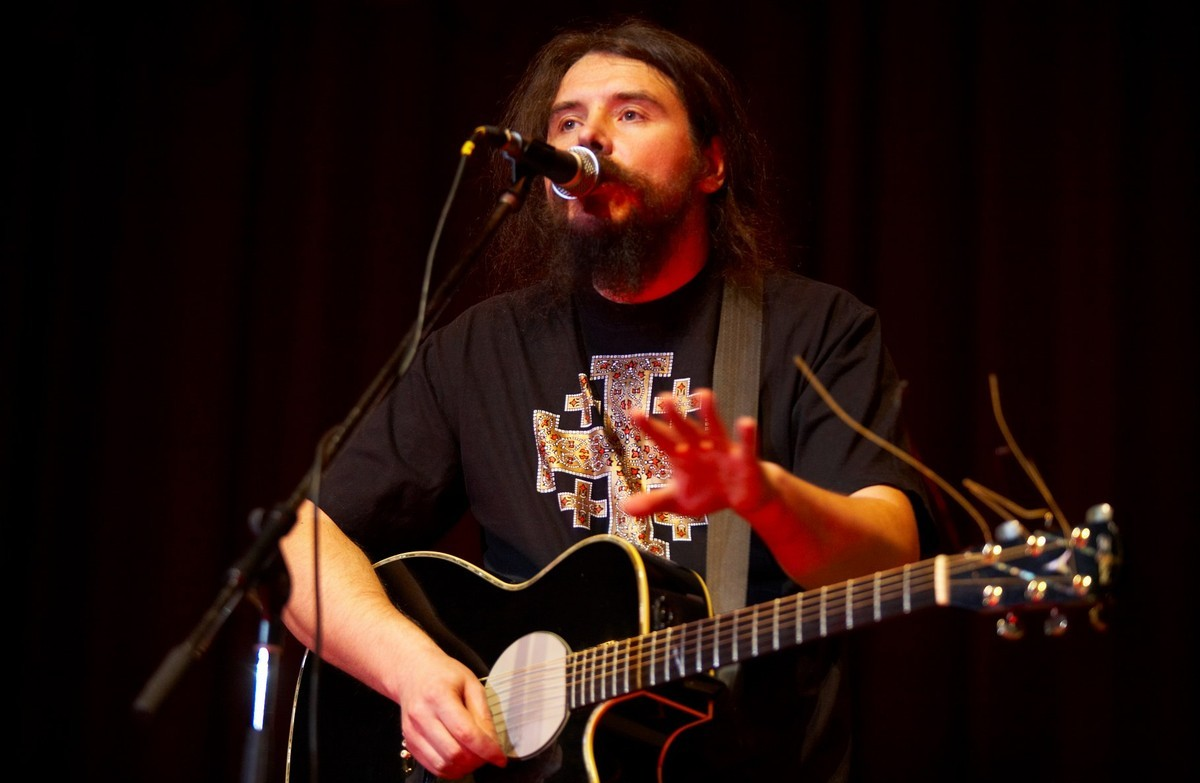

Background information
- Origin: USSR, Russia
- Genres: Rock, Folk rock, Blues-rock, Shamanic rock, Art rock, Christian rock (later)
- Years active: 1984–present
- Members: Dmitry Revyakin (vocals, guitar); Victor Chapligin (drums); Aleksand Vladikin (piano, keyboards); Konstantin Kovachev (guitar); Dmitriy Grudaenko (bass guitar)

Kalinov Most (Калинов мост) is a Russian folk rock band from Novosibirsk. The band was formed in 1984 by vocalist and songwriter Dmitry Revyakin.

== History of the group ==
=== 1980s-1990s ===
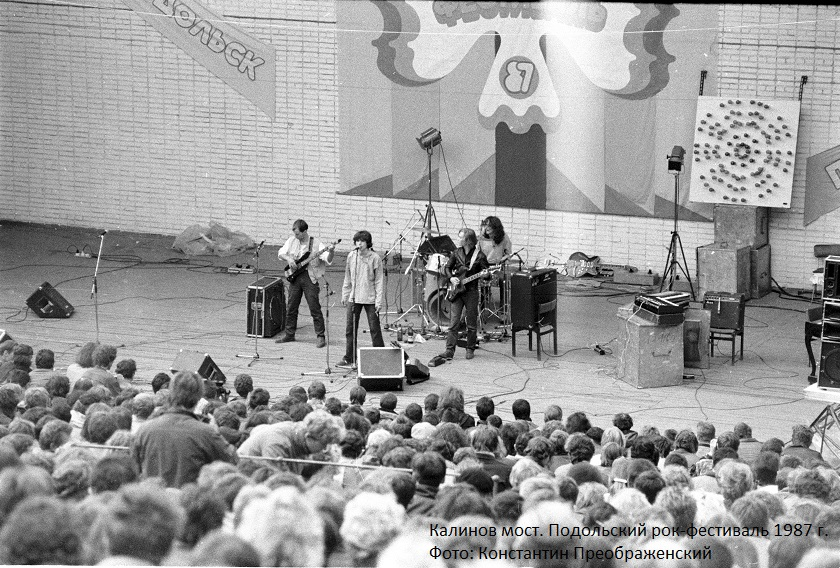
Kalinov Most at the Podolsk Rock Festival, 1987

In 1984, students of the Novosibirsk Electrotechnical Institute Dmitry Revyakin and Dmitry Selivanov, decided to create their own rock band, founding Kalinov Most in the mid-1980s in Novosibirsk. In 1986, they were joined by drummer Viktor Chaplygin and bassist Andrey Shchennikov. The name "Kalinov Most" was suggested by Revyakin's then-girlfriend Olga, who later became his wife. Selivanov left and was replaced by guitarist Vasily Smolentsev. The band's studio activity began in 1988, when Dmitry Revyakin met producer Stas Namin. In the fall, the band moved to Moscow to record its first studio album, but due to a lack of experience and instability in the lineup, it was left uncompleted.

In 1990, Kalinov Most came to Moscow again, where they recorded their debut album Vyvoroten, released on vinyl. Later, the band recorded two more albums there: Darza and Uzaren'. At the same time, the group began touring in Western Russia.

After the release of the concert compilation Traven', Revyakin announced his departure and took up the solo project Revyakin i Soratniki.

In 1997, Kalinovv Most began rehearsing material for a new album, Oruzhiye. Andrey Shchennikov left the band, replaced by Oleg Tatarenko. In 1998, Oruzhiye released to wide acclaim, with many critics recognizing it as a landmark in Russian rock. Around the same time, archival recordings were released on the Moroz Records label. The year's releases had significantly improved the band's financial situation, and it acquired many regular fans in St. Petersburg and Moscow. From 1998 to 2003, the group included bassist Yevgeny Baryshev, whom Revyakin met in Chita.

=== 2000s ===
In 2001, Kalinov Most released the album Ruda, after which it took a five-year break in releasing albums. During this time, the band repeatedly changed its lineup, performed in different cities, and recorded material for a new album. Guitarist Konstantin Kovachev joined the lineup, replacing Vasily Smolentsev. In 2006, the album SWA was released, featuring a heavier emphasis on lyrics. The album is dedicated to the memory of Dmitry's wife Olga, who died of a heart attack in December 2005.

In 2007, the album Ledyanoy pokhod was released, which was radically different from the previous one in lyrical content. The album is almost entirely dedicated to the theme of war and heroism, expressed sympathy for the White movement, and was influenced by Russian Orthodoxy, which Revyakin accepted in 2000. Revyakin himself considers it to be Kalinov Most's most important album, saying that it "fulfilled Kalinov Most's mission".

In 2009, Kalinov Most's next album, Serdtse, was released, with its central theme being love. Like SWA, the album is dedicated to the memory of Olga.

In July 2009, the band headlined several festivals: Nahsestviye, Serdtse Parmy (Perm Krai), and Rok-etno-stan (Sverdlovsk Oblast).

=== 2010s ===
In 2010, Kalinov Most released Kalinov Most: Zhatva Catharsis Quest on DVD, was released. The DVD featured Revyakin's solo album, Zhatva, in a new concert performance by Kalinov Most, accompanied by a conceptual video sequence.

At the end of the same year, Kalinov Most's new studio album, Eskhato, was released. The album's launch party took place on 12 November at the B-2 club. Two songs from the album, "Angely raya" and "Mat' Evropa", achieved unprecedented success for the band, charting 1st place in the "Chartova Dyuzhina" hit parade on Nashe Radio for six weeks in a row each.

Also in 2010, the band recorded a tribute album in memory of Alexander Bashlachev, titled Serebro i slyozy, released in 2014. Many famous rock musicians from Russia and the post-Soviet space took part in the project, most of whom knew Alexander personally.

In March 2012, the album Zolotoye tolokno was released. The album's launch took place on 20 September at the Moscow Variety Theater. The release entered the 20 best-selling albums in Russia at 20th place.

In 2013, the album Contra was released. The album's launch party took place in the Moscow club Teatr on 22 November. The album was described by Revyakin as "tough, urban"; in it, he expressed a protest "against modern world trends", which, from his point of view, are destructive.

At the end of October 2015, the album Tsiklon was released, dedicated to the Kamchatka Peninsula. The album's launch party took place on 6 November at the RED club in Moscow. Several videos from the concert were posted on the band's official YouTube channel. On 21 November 2015, the music video for "Na Krayu Zemli" premiered. On 1 December, the band published a video for the song "Gorizonty". It is noteworthy that it became the second version of the video for this composition, the first releasing in early October 2015.

In 2016, the band released the album Sezon ovets. In the same year, the band celebrated its 30th anniversary; in honor of this, the documentary film Kalinov Most: A Play for 30 Years was released.

In 2019, the album "Dauriya was released, dedicated to the Transbaikal, where Revyakin is from. Revyakin conceived the album in 2015, and the album began recording in early 2018.

In the fall of 2019, guitarist Konstantin Kovachev and bass player Andrey Baslyk left the band. Kovachev was replaced by Alexey Lebedev. Baslyk later returned to the band.

== Discography ==
=== Studio albums ===
- 1986 — Калинов мост (Kalinov most/Kalinov Bridge)
- 1990 — Выворотень (Vivoroten’/Eversion)
- 1991 — Узарень (Uzaren’)
- 1991 — Дарза (Darza)
- 1993 — Пояс Ульчи (Poyas Ul'chi/Ulchi Belt)
- 1998 — Оружие (Oruzhiye/The Weapon)
- 2001 — Руда (Ruda/Ore)
- 2006 — SWA
- 2007 — Ледяной поход (Ledyanoy pohod/Ice Campaign)
- 2009 — Сердце (Serdce/Heart)
- 2010 — Эсхато (Eshato/Eschato)
- 2012 — Золотое толокно (Zolotoye tolokno/Golden flour)
- 2013 - Contra
- 2015 - Циклон (Tsiclon/Cylcone)
- 2016 - Трибьют Калинов Мост (Dan' Uvazheniya Kalinovu Mostu/Tribute to the Kalinov Bridge)
- 2017 - Сезон овец (Sezon Ovets/The Sheep Season)
- 2018 - Трибьют Калинов Мост 2 (Dan' Uvazheniya Kalinovu Mostu 2/Tribute to Kalinov Bridge 2)
- 2019 - Даурия (Dauriya/Dauria)
- 2022 - Холсты (Kholst/Canvas)

=== Live albums ===
- 1987 — Надо было (Live)(Nado bylo / It Was Necessary)
- 1988 — Вольница (Live)(Vol'nitsa / Free Rein)
- 1991 — Мелодии голых ветвей (Live) (Melodii golyh vetvey / Melodies of Naked Branches)
- 1993 — Никак 406 (Live)(Nikak 406 / nowise)
- 1994 — Покориться весне (Live)(Pokoritsya vesnye / To Obey Spring)
- 1997 — Живая коллекция (Live)(Zhivaya kollektsiya / Alive Collection)
- 1999 — Катунь (Live)(Katun' / Katun)

=== Other releases ===
- 1988 — Всякие разные песни (D.Revyakin solo)(Vsyakiye raznye pesni / Any Different Songs)
- 1988 — Обломилась доска (D.Revyakin solo)(Oblomilas' doska / The Board Has Broken Off)
- 1988 — Охта (Д. Ревякин соло) (Ohta / Okhta)
- 1992 — Ливень (Liven' / Downpour)
- 1994 — Быль (Byl' / True Story)
- 1995 — Травень (Traven' / May)
- 1996 — Всё поле в цветах (D.Revyakin solo)(Vsyo pole v tsvetah / All Field in Flowers)
- 1998 — Обряд (D.Revyakin solo)(Obryad / Ceremony)
- 1999 — Улетай (Uletay / Fly Away)
- 2000 — Иерусалим (макси-сингл)(Ierusalim / Jerusalem)
- 2022 - Четыре стороны (Chetyre Storony/Four Sides)
