= Vasily Fyodorovich Trutovsky =

Russian composer

Vasily Fyodorovich Trutovsky (Russian: Василий Фёдорович Трутовский) (c. 1740 – c. 1810) was a Russian folk-song collector, gusli player, and composer, in the Russian Empire. He compiled and published the earliest printed collection of Russian folk-music.

He was born near Belgorod, in Ivanovskaya Sloboda, where his father was assigned as a priest for the regimental settlement. In 1762 Trutovsky entered the Russian Imperial court as a singer and gusli player; he left the court some 30 years later. By 1792 Trutovsky was still active as a collector and composer, supported by various patrons from aristocratic families. He died around 1810 in Saint-Petersburg.

Trutovsky's most important work is Sobraniye russkikh prostïkh pesen s notami (Собрание русских простых песен с нотами, "Collection of simple Russian songs with scores"), a collection of 80 folk-songs with melodies. It was the earliest published collection of its kind: the first three volumes appeared between 1776 and 1779, and one more followed in 1795. Trutovsky drew the material from both his own studies and from manuscripts compiled by others; he also included some Ukrainian songs, music by Russian composers, his own arrangements of music by others, etc. At first, Trutovsky only included the melody and a bass line, but volume 4 and a reprint of volume 1 contained more harmonic filling done by him.

The Sobraine proved to be an influential work: more than half of its contents was published in a later important collection by Johann Gottfried Pratsch, and some of the songs provided inspiration and models for composers such as Mussorgsky, Rimsky-Korsakov, and others. Only a few of Trutovsky's own compositions survived: Kruzhka (Кружка, "A Cup"), a song for voice and piano (1777), and two sets of keyboard variations on folk-songs (1780): "Vo lesochke komarochkov" (Во лесочке комарочков, Lots of Gnats in Our Forest) and "Ty, detinushka, sirotinushka" (Ты, детинушка, сиротинушка, You, My Little Nowhere Child). Both sets are notable for transfer of some of gusli-specific technique to keyboard.

== Recordings ==
- Russian Clavichords of the 18th century. 1996. Aleksei Lubimov (piano, hammered clavichord). Facsimile RCD19101
