= Johann Gottfried Pratsch =

Prussian-born composer (c. 1750 – c. 1816)

Johann Gottfried Pratsch Jan Bohumír Práč
- Also known as: Иоганн (Иван) Готфрид
- Born: 1750
- Died: 1798–1818
- Occupations: Composer; folklorist; music educator; pianist; conductor

Johann Gottfried Pratsch (Czech: Jan Bohumír Práč; Russian: Иван Готфрид Прач, romanized: Ivan Gotfrid Prach; German: Johann Gottfried Pratsch, also called Prach; c. 1750 – c. 1818), was a Prussian-born composer of music. He spent most of his life in Russia, and sometimes supported himself by teaching music to students at the Smolnïy Institute and at the St. Petersburg Theatre School.

== Life ==
Pratsch was born in Silesia in 1750, and was Czech by ethnicity. He worked as a piano teacher in Saint Petersburg in the 1770s. He taught music at the Smolnїy Institute from 1780 to 1785. In 1784, the St. Petersburg Theatre School appointed him harpsichord teacher. He collaborated with Nikolay Lvov on a collection of Russian folk songs, which was published in 1790. The collection, called "Sobraniye Narodnїkh Russikikh Pesen s Ikh Golosami" ("Collection of Russian Folk Songs with Their Tunes"), influenced composers in Russia and throughout the world, including composers such as Alexander Glazunov, Alexander Gretchaninov, Sergei Rachmaninoff, Igor Stravinsky, Gioachino Rossini, Johann Nepomuk Hummel, Carl Maria von Weber, Fernando Sor, and Ludwig van Beethoven.

== Works ==
- Rondo in F major
- Sonata for piano in C major, Opus no. 1
- Fandango for piano, Opus no. 2 (1795)
- Cello sonata in A minor, Opus 6

=== Publications ===
- 1790: A Collection of Russian Folk Songs (Nikolai Lvov and Ivan Prach)

== See also ==
- Russian folk music
- Nikolay Lvov
- Russian Museum of Ethnography
- List of Russian composers

== Sources ==
- "Прач, Иоган-Готфрид" . Brockhaus and Efron Encyclopedic Dictionary (in Russian). 1906.
