= Matviy Nomys =

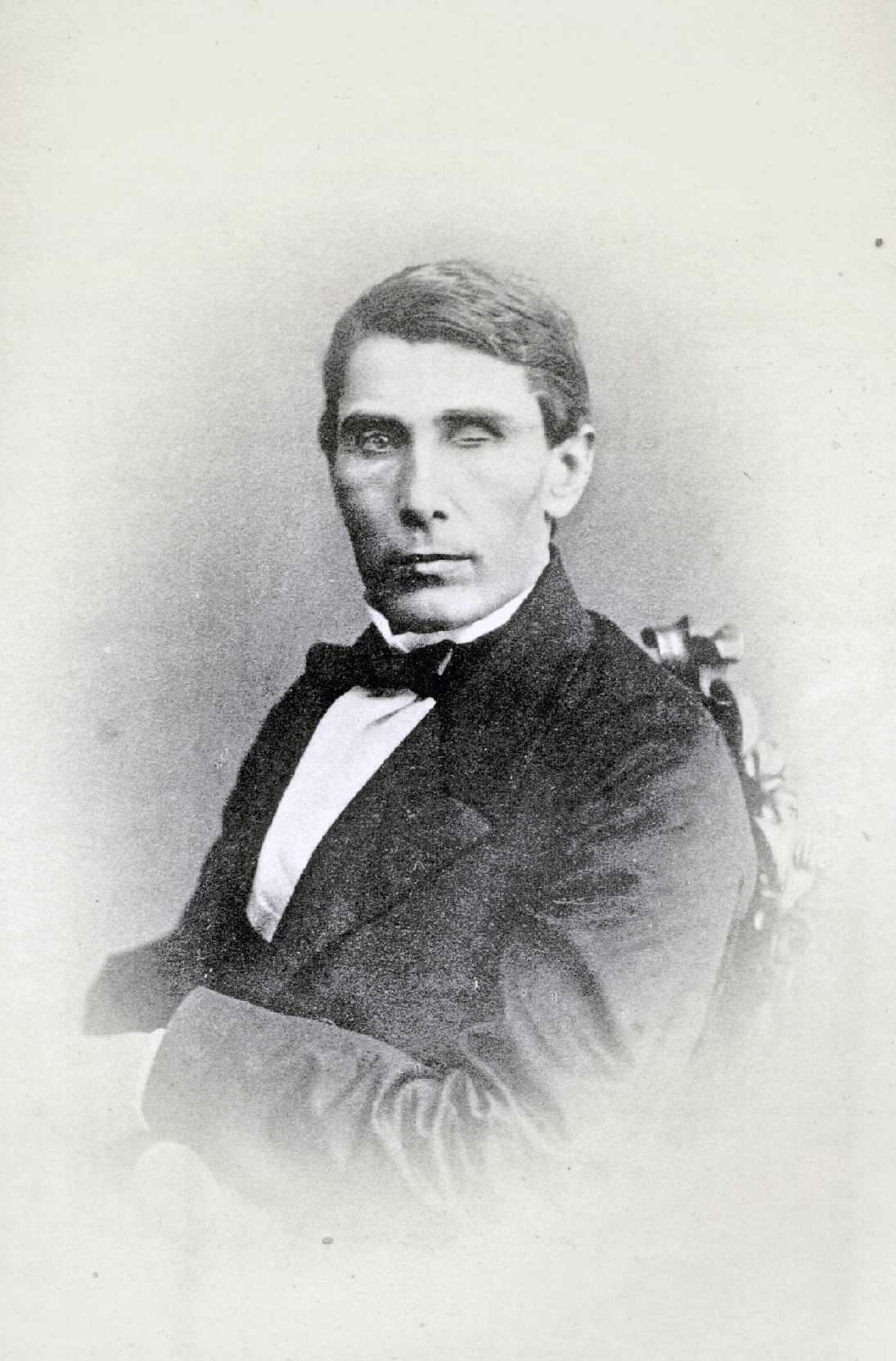
Matviy Nomys

Matviy Nomys (Ukrainian: Матвій Номис, real name: Matviy Terentiyovych Symonov (Матві́й Тере́нтійович Си́монов, Russian: Матвей Терентьевич Симонов), 17 November 1823, in Zarih, Orzhytsia Raion, Poltava Oblast – 26 December 1900, in Lubny) was a Ukrainian ethnographer, folklorist, writer and teacher. He is best known as an editor and publisher of one of the most comprehensive and authoritative collections of some of Ukrainian folklore genres, such as proverbs, sayings, riddles and so on.

== Biography ==
Symonov (Nomys) was born to a family of a wealthy official.

In 1848, he graduated from Kyiv University. He started his career as a teacher of high schools in Nizhyn and Nemyriv. Then he worked as a clerk in St. Petersburg, Pskov, Katerynoslav and Zhytomyr. In 1873, he was appointed as a director of Lubny gymnasium and in 1877 – a head of Lubny local council and magistrate.

== Creative activities ==
Throughout his life, Nomys researched and recorded Ukrainian folklore, including customs and rituals.

He began to publish in 1858. He has published several articles on Ukrainian folk customs and rituals. The following journals published his materials: Russkaya Beseda [The Russian Colloquy], Osnova [The Basis], Kyivska Mynuvshyna [Kievan Past] and others.

Most of his readers better know Matviy Symonov under his pseudonym Nomys, which is his surname Symonov (minus two letters ‘-ov’) read backwards.

M. Nomys’ most prominent work is Ukrainian proverbs, sayings and so on. Collections of Opanas Markovych and others. Edited by M. Nomys (St. Petersburg, 1864). The book contains more than 14.5 thousands proverbs, 505 riddles and other folklore pieces. It also includes records of Stepan Rudanskyi, Vasyl Bilozerskyi, Panteleimon Kulish, Marko Vovchok and others.

Nomys also wrote prose and is defined by scholars as a romantic writer. His book, entitled Short stories of M. T. Symonov (Nomys), was published in 1900.
