= Novosibirsk State Technical University =

Public university in Novosibirsk, Russia

- Новосибирский государственный технический университет
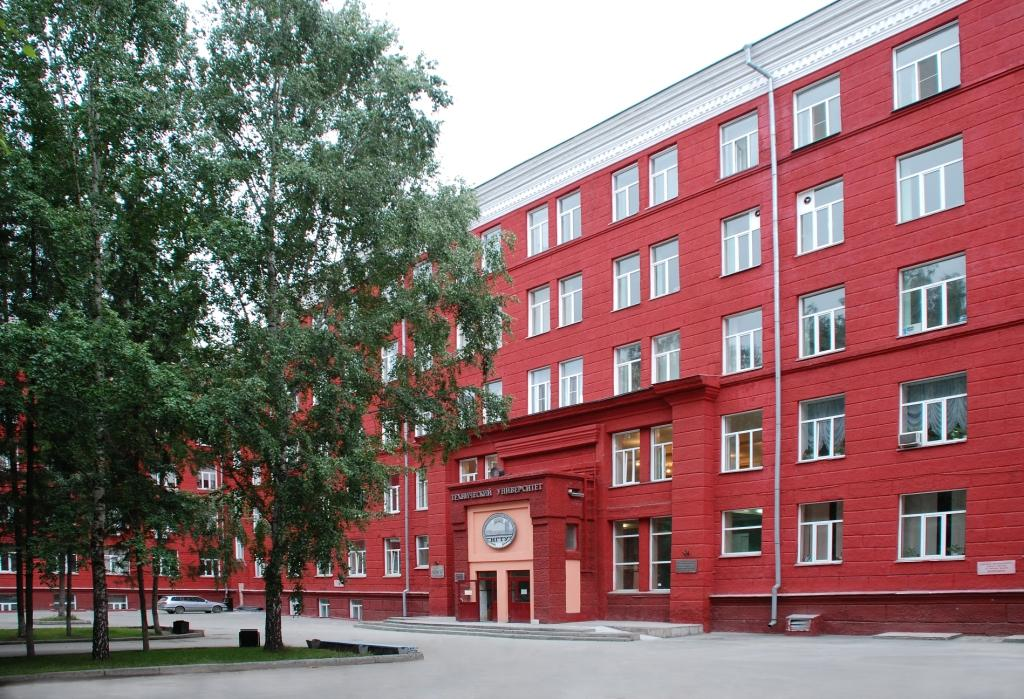
- Motto: DOCENDO DISCIMUS
- Established: 1950
- Rector: Igor Vladimirovich Marchuk
- Students: 14,000
- Location: Novosibirsk, Russia; 54.988°N 82.904°E
- Website: nstu.ru

University rankings

Regional – Overall
- QS Emerging Europe and Central Asia: 112 (2022)

Novosibirsk State Technical University (NSTU), until 1992 the Novosibirsk Electrotechnical Institute (NETI), is one of the major research and educational centers of Russia as well as one of the top technical universities located in Novosibirsk, Russia.

== History ==
The university was established in accordance with the USSR Council of Ministries' Decree of 19 August 1950. It has 11 faculties and 2 institutes: the Institute of Social Rehabilitation and the Institute of Distant Education, 73 departments, 4 branches, and 9 NSTU representative offices. At present, more than 14,000 students are receiving quality education at NSTU. The teaching staff consists of 968 full-time and 216 part-time lecturers, including 184 Professors, Doctors of Science, 762 Associate Professors, and Candidates of Science.

The Center of Information Technologies provides the university with a local network of more than 600 computers. The network has more than 5 km of connections with access to the internet. A project for accessing information from the scientific library is underway. Since 1996, a database has been under development on the basis of Folio Infobase. The university publishes the journal NSTU Bulletin, scientific works, textbooks, monographs, and teaching manuals. Candidates of Science and Doctors of Science are conferred by 11 specialist councils.

The university's library holds a book supply, consisting of the newest books in English, received by the university within the framework of the program TACIS - "Economic Education". The printing house of NSTU publishes scientific transactions and monographs and provides students with notebooks and school supplies. The university has an academic choir, an ensemble of violinists widely known in Novosibirsk, and a jazz orchestra, the laureate of a large number of competitions and festivals, including the European Music Festival for Young People in Neerpelt.

== International links ==
NSTU actively cooperates with foreign universities and has made 25 agreements for co-operation in scientific research, education, and culture with universities in America, Germany, France, South Korea, China, etc. Also, student mobility is promoted with other technical universities through the Salzburg Seminar, Britain Council, DAAD, INTAS, TEMPUS, EDRUS-TACIS, and TACIS.

A regional center for international cooperation in the educational field of engineering has been working in NSTU since 1995. Authorized training centers of leading companies from the US and Germany, e.g., Sun Microsystems, Texas Instruments, Schneider, DEC, Autodesk, Motorola, AEG, and DMG have been opened. In 2009, NSTU was chosen as a university of the Shanghai Cooperation Organisation. It is a member of several academic co-operations and maintains close links to the industry. The university attracts teachers from other countries, especially for foreign language training (English, German, French, Korean, Japanese, Chinese, and Turkish).

== Organization ==
The university is made up of 73 departments, organized into 11 faculties:

- Automation and Computer Science
- Business
- Humanities
- Physical Engineering
- Jurisprudence
- Applied Mathematics and Computer Science
- Electromechanical Engineering
- Radio Engineering and Electronics
- Aircraft Engineering
- Power Engineering
- Mechanics and Technology

== Study structure ==
Training is conducted using a multilevel structure of education:

- Baccalaureate (bakalavr) degree, delivering a broad understanding of fundamental Engineering Science and a thorough introduction to Economics, Management, and Communication. Students are admitted through competitive examinations for students holding a Higher School Diploma or by virtue of outstanding academic records.
- A specialist degree opens access to professional practice in areas like medicine, engineering, and teaching, and it is also the traditional prerequisite for admission to doctoral studies. The qualification of Specialist Diploma is awarded after studies lasting 5 to 6 years. The diploma is awarded in all fields of study, including various specializations. The State final attestation for a Specialist Diploma covers the defense of a project or a thesis and the State final examinations. The procedure for the State final attestation and for the award of the Diploma, as well as the content of the Diploma supplement, are the same as for the bachelor's degree. The Specialist Diploma gives access to a PhD program or employment.
- Master's (magistr) degree is generally of two years' duration and has a more pronounced research focus in comparison to the Specialist Diploma. Each faculty has its own specific admission requirements.
- Candidate of Sciences (kandidat nauk) (as an equivalent to PhD) degree normally requires at least three years of study after the award of the Specialist Diploma or the Magistr degree and defending the dissertation.

== Notable alumni ==
- Natalia Fileva (1963–2019) was a Russian businesswoman and chairman of the board of directors of S7 Airlines.
- Anatoly Lokot (born 1959), a member of the CPRF, a member of the State Duma, the former mayor of Novosibirsk.
- Dmitry Revyakin (born 1964), rock musician, frontman for the Russian folk rock band Kalinov Most.
- Alexandr Sysoyev (born 1961), Russian businessman, founder of the 2GIS.
- Sergey Zayashnikov (born 1964), sports promoter, author.

== See also ==
- Violin Ensemble of Novosibirsk State Technical University
