= The Songs of My Mother =

Studio album by Vitas
- Released: April 3, 2004
- Recorded: 2001–2003
- Genre: Pop; folk
- Length: 43:19
- Label: Iceberg Music
- Producer: Eduard Izmestyev

Vitas chronology
Mama (2003)	The Songs of My Mother (2004)	A Kiss as Long as Eternity (2004)

The Songs of My Mother (Russian: Песни моей мамы) is an album by the singer Vitas. It was released on 3 April 2004. (Note: Most sources, including official ones, incorrectly state that it was released in 2003. This confusion stems from the fact that the tour promoting both this album and Mama, which had the same name, began in 2003. However, according to press releases from the time, the actual album was released on 3 April 2004.) Together with the previous album Mama, the two albums were a tribute to his late mother. Songs from these albums featured heavily in the setlist of Vitas' extensive world tour The Songs of My Mother, performed at hundreds of venues in several countries between 2004 and 2006.

While Mama included several new songs written by Vitas, The Songs of My Mother consists entirely of cover versions of popular older songs, described as "the gold reserves of Russian pop music", including the 1980 song "The Bird of Happiness", composed by Aleksandra Pakhmutova and Nikolai Dobronravov (from Yuri Ozerov's 1981 film O Sport, You – the world!), previously recorded by the Vocal and Instrumental Ensemble Zdravstvuy, Pesnya, among others. The song The Bird of Happiness became from 1981 on forward the most successful in both Russia and China, and is still often performed by Vitas on stage. The song Chrysanthemums Have Faded was previously included on Vitas' Smile! album. All the other tracks were newly recorded for The Songs of My Mother.

Vitas performed a piano-backed arrangement of Winter on a Russian New Year TV show in 2002.

== Track listing ==
No.	Title	Lyrics	Music	English title	Length
1.	"Птица счастья"	Nikolai Dobronravov	Aleksandra Pakhmutova	The Bird of Happiness	3:25
2.	"Любите, пока любится"	Mikhail Ryabinin	Aleksandr Morozov	Love While You Can	3:22
3.	"В краю магнолий"	Yuriy Martsinkyevich	Morozov	In the District of Magnolias	3:56
4.	"Всё могут короли"	Leonid Derbenev	Boris Rychkov	Kings Can Do Everything	3:33
5.	"Зима"	Sergey Ostrovoy	Eduard Khanok	Winter	3:12
6.	"Гадалка"	Derbenev	Maksim Dunayevsky	Fortune Teller	3:40
7.	"Букет"	Nikolay Rubtsov	Aleksandr Barykin	Bouquet	3:04
8.	"Морская песенка"	Mikhail Slovodskoy, Vadim Dykhovichniy	Nikita Bogoslovsky	A Sea Song	2:30
9.	"Говорящая кукла"	Grigoriy Gorbovskiy	Morozov	The Speaking Doll	2:53
10.	"Отцвели хризантемы"	Vasiliy Shumskiy	Nikolai Kharito	Chrysanthemums Have Faded	3:54
11.	"Горький мёд"	Vadim Pavlinov	Oleg Ivanov	Bitter Honey	3:41
12.	"А цыган идёт"	Rudyard Kipling, translated by Grigory Kruzhkov	Aleksandr Petrov	And the Gypsy Is Going	2:59
13.	"Одесса"	Arkadiy Ukupnik	Mikhail Tanich	Odessa	3:07

Limited edition CD bonus track
No.	Title	Length
14.	"Птица счастья" (Trnceformer remix)	3:31

== Personnel ==
- Sergey Pudovkin – production
- Mikhail Dobrotvorskiy – management
- Dmitriy Dobrotvorskiy – direction
- Eduard Izmestyev – production, arrangement
- Mikhail Grishin – engineering
- Ilya Grebenyuk – keyboards
- Aleksandr Gruzdev – guitar, saxophone
- Rashit Kiyamov – bass guitar
- Rushan Kharryasov – drums, percussion
- Oboz Design Studio – sleeve design
