= Leniniana (album) =

Studio album by Kommunizm
- Released: 1989 (formally)
- Recorded: Base: September 23, 1989 (editing made of 13 samples included in the track "Leniniana" and later became independent); Bonus: see dates § 2013 Wyrgorod edition (CD)
- Studio: GrOb (Omsk, USSR)
- Genre: Sound collage; radio theatre
- Length: 33:36 (HOR); 46:40 (Wyrgorod)
- Language: Russian; Tajik
- Label: GrOb
- Producer: Yegor Letov

Kommunizm chronology
Igra v samoletiki pod krovatyu (1989)	Leniniana (1989)	Trinadtsat (1990)

2013 reissue cover

Leniniana (Russian: Лениниана) is the twelfth studio album of the Soviet conceptual band Kommunizm. It is a sound collage based on the phonogram of the film Lenin in October, published on a gramophone record by the Melodiya company. Yegor Letov and Konstantin Ryabinov glued inserts together, they played various musical compositions backwards and added third-party records from the field of concrete music, thereby creating a montage mystifying the personality of Vladimir Ilyich Lenin in a humorous manner.

The album was officially released on Caravan Records and HOR in 2001, and it was reissued on April 22, 2013, by Wyrgorod.

== About the album ==
Original text in Russian
- Этакий разнузданный, полуобезумевший получасовой коллаж из ленинского и пост-ленинского материала. Использована уникальная запись детской народной песни «Это было в городе Черкасске» в душевном исполнении моей малолетней племянницы. В целом, это — гротескная, многокрасочная, болезненная и, как мне кажется, страшноватая в своей болезненности — работа.
English translation
- A sort of unbridled, half-mad half-hour collage of Leninist and post-Leninist material. A unique recording of a children's folk song "It Was in the City of Cherkassk" was used, performed by my little niece. In general, this is a grotesque, multicolored, painful and, as it seems to me, scary work in its pain.

— Kontr Kult Ur'a No. 3 – Yegor Letov: Grob-Hroniki

== Track listing ==
=== 2001 Caravan edition (MC) ===
A-side

1. Лениниана (part 1)*

B-side

1. Лениниана (part 2)*

All tracks were recorded on September 23, 1989, at the GrOb-studio in Omsk.

* The names of the tracks are conditional – they are not printed either on the J-card or on the cassette itself, but a priori it's all one audio track, divided into two parts. The B-side does not include the following three compositions from the HOR's CD/MC: "Slova i zhesty", "Lenin ne umer", and "Lenin umer".

=== 2001 HOR edition (CD) ===
No.	Title	Lyrics	Music	Length
1.	"Лениниана" (Leniniana)	Abolqasem Lahouti (at 0:00–0:58), from Lenin in October: Fragments from the Film LP, traditional (at 4:34–6:14 and 24:31–24:39 performed by Diana Letova), Sergey Alekseev (at 6:15–6:29, 8:12–9:09, and 15:00–17:07 narrated by Vladimir Gertsik), Zinaida Aleksandrova (at 8:07–8:11 and 13:14–13:18), Margarita Fofanova (at 10:02–10:20), Nikolay Nosov (at 21:47–23:25), V. I. Lenin (at 23:27–24:30), Leonid Derbenyov (at 24:39–28:12 performed by Edita Piekha)	Suleiman Yudakov (at 0:00–0:58), Steamboat Stompers (at 12:10–12:41), Arkasha Klimkin (at 23:26–24:30), Alexander Bronevitsky (at 24:39–28:12 performed by Edita Piekha)	28:12
2.	"Слова и жесты" (Words and Gestures)	Polina Vinogradsky	n/a	0:25
3.	"Ленин не умер" (Lenin Is Not Dead)	Suleyman Stalsky	Steamboat Stompers (background music "See See Rider")	3:42
4.	"Ленин умер" (Lenin Is Dead)	Suleyman Stalsky	Kommunizm (phonogram of the funeral ceremony with the participation of the Omsk funeral orchestra)	1:17
Total length:				33:36

- GrOb-studio, Omsk:
  - Track 1 was recorded on September 23, 1989.
  - Tracks 2–4 were recorded on March 26–28, 1989.

=== 2013 Wyrgorod edition (CD) ===
No.	Title	Lyrics	Music	Length
1.	"Гимн" (Anthem)	Abolqasem Lahouti	Suleiman Yudakov	1:01
2.	"Рассказы соратников — Любит делать так — Какой он из себя" (Companions' Stories—Loves Doing So—What Is He Like)	from Lenin in October: Fragments from the Film LP	n/a	3:36
3.	"Это было в городе ЧК" (It Was in the City of Cherkassk)	Traditional (performed by Diana Letova)	n/a	1:44
4.	"Ленин видит девочку — Ждать — Спать" (Lenin Sees a Girl—Wait For—Sleep)	Sergey Alekseev ("Ленин видит девочку" narrated by Vladimir Gertsik), from Lenin in October: Fragments from the Film LP ("Ждать" and "Спать")	n/a	1:53
5.	"Маленькой ёлочке холодно зимой — Отдых Ленина — Записка" (Cute Little Fir Tree Is Freezing in the Woods—Lenin's Rest—Note)	Zinaida Aleksandrova ("Маленькой ёлочке холодно зимой"), Sergey Alekseev ("Отдых Ленина" narrated by Vladimir Gertsik), Margarita Fofanova ("Записка")	n/a	2:18
6.	"И тогда уж мы — Вот так так — А если" (And Then Already We—By Gad—What If)	from Lenin in October: Fragments from the Film LP	n/a	1:51
7.	"Я кончил" (I Finished)	n/a	Steamboat Stompers (background music "Waiting for Robert E. Lee")	0:33
8.	"Терентьевых спалили — Хоровоз — Дайте настоящего душителя — Ленин спит" (Set the Terentyevs on Fire—Round Danse—Give (Me) a Real Strangler—Lenin Is Sleeping)	from Lenin in October: Fragments from the Film LP ("Терентьевых спалили", "Дайте настоящего душителя", and "Ленин спит"), Zinaida Aleksandrova ("Хоровоз")	n/a	2:21
9.	"Сон Ленина" (Lenin's Dream)	Sergey Alekseev (narrated by Vladimir Gertsik)	n/a	3:45
10.	"Случай с товарищем Сапуновым — Смерть большевика Григория — Громовое ура — Ленинское слово" (The Incident with Comrade Sapunov—Death of the Bolshevik Grigory—Thunderous Hurrah—Lenin's Speech)	from Lenin in October: Fragments from the Film LP	n/a	3:09
11.	"Представьте себе" (Imagine)	Nikolay Nosov	n/a	1:40
12.	"Ленинский хардкор" (Leninist Hardcore)	V. I. Lenin	Arkasha Klimkin	1:06
13.	"Эпилог" (Epilogue)	Traditional (at 0:00–0:08 performed by Diana Letova), Leonid Derbenyov (at 0:08–3:32 performed by Edita Piekha)	Alexander Bronevitsky (at 0:08–3:32 performed by Edita Piekha)	3:32

Bonus tracks
No.	Title	Lyrics	Music	Length
14.	"Высшее достижение" (Highest Achievement)	n/a	n/a	0:56
15.	"Ленин не умер" (Lenin Is Not Dead)	Suleyman Stalsky	Steamboat Stompers (background music "See See Rider")	3:41
16.	"Революция свершилась" (Revolution Has Occurred)	from Lenin in October: Fragments from the Film LP	A. Berchansky	0:29
17.	"Паричок" (Wig)	from Lenin in October: Fragments from the Film LP	n/a	0:14
18.	"Поймаю маленького сам" (I'll Catch the Little One Myself)	Red guard Korolev (narrated by Kuzya Uo)	Kommunizm	1:47
19.	"Слова и жесты" (Words and Gestures)	Polina Vinogradsky	n/a	0:24
20.	"Надо брать дворец" (Must Take the Palace!)	from Lenin in October: Fragments from the Film LP	n/a	0:23
21.	"Кусок отрезал" (Piece of Bread)	G. Lidzin (narrated by Yegor Letov)	Kommunizm	3:13
22.	"Что такое Советская власть" (What Is Soviet Power)	V. I. Lenin	Moisey Vaynberg	0:30
23.	"Развлечения Ильича в ссылке" (Ilyich's Amusements in Exile)	Peasant Stroganov (narrated by Kuzya Uo)	Kommunizm	2:15
24.	"Ленин умер" (Lenin Is Dead)	Suleyman Stalsky	Kommunizm (phonogram of the funeral ceremony with the participation of the Omsk funeral orchestra)	1:16
25.	"И вновь продолжается бой" (And the Battle Is Going Again)	Nikolai Dobronravov	Aleksandra Pakhmutova (arranged by Grazhdanskaya Oborona)	3:03
Total length:				46:40

- GrOb-studio, Omsk:
  - Tracks 1–13 were recorded on September 23, 1989.
  - Track 14 was recorded in early April, 1989.
  - Tracks 15, 17, 19–20, and 24 were recorded on March 26–28, 1989.
  - Tracks 16 and 22 were recorded on March 20–21, 1989.
  - Tracks 18, 21, and 23 were recorded on May 15–17, 1989.
- SP Krylya Sovetov, Moscow:
  - Track 25 was recorded on July 4, 1997.

== Personnel ==
Credits are adapted from the album liner notes.

Kommunizm

- Yegor Letov – editing, effects, industrial
- Kuzya Uo – effects, vocals on "Lyubit delat tak...", industrial, saxophone
- Arkasha Klimkin – drums on "Leninskiy hardkor"

Production

- Yegor Letov – mixing, restoration, artwork, design
- Natalia Chumakova – mixing, restoration, mastering, design
- Kuzya Uo – artwork
- Evgeny Kolesov, GrOb-records archive – photography

Uncredited personnel

- Diana Letova – vocals on "Eto bylo v gorode ChK" and "Epilog"

== Release history ==
Official
Country	Date	Format	Label	Catalog
Russia	2001	MC	Caravan	CAR 104
Russia	2001 (compact disc – August 22, cassette – unknown)	CD (jewel box); MC	HOR	HCD-039a; hmc-039
Russia	April 22, 2013	CD (digipak)	Wyrgorod	ВЫРГОРОД 103

== Trivia ==
- According to Oleg "Manager" Sudakov, the album Leniniana is one of the most successful creations of Kommunizm:

Original text in Russian
- В ноябре создали «Лениниану» — препарированный миф о вожде, гротескно-разнузданное полотно об абсурдности поклонения. Впечатление по мощи сравнимо с первыми альбомами: вдруг перекрутит, согнёт пополам и опрокинет на спину. Слушали много раз, восторгались и цитировали взахлёб.
English translation
- In November, Leniniana was created—a prepared myth about the leader, a grotesquely unbridled canvas about the absurdity of worship. The impression is comparable to the power of the first albums: it will suddenly twist, bend in half and overturn on its back. We listened many times, admired and quoted with gusto.

— Kommunizm: between shocking and epitaph

- Despite the declared month of creation in Manager's blog, the album information on the back cover indicates September—and so in all official releases of various labels.

- Most of the bonus tracks are taken from the album Chudo-muzyka, these are: "Lenin ne umer", "Parichok", "Slova i zhesty", "Nado brat dvorets", "Lenin umer". The rest are taken from:
  - Rodina slyshit – "Chto takoe Sovetskaya vlast"; (Note: Album track title "Konkretnaya muzyka #3 Chto takoe Sovetskaya vlast?".)
  - Narodovedenie – "Vysshee dostizhenie"; (Note: Album track title "Vladimir Ilich".)
  - Igra v samoletiki pod krovatyu – "Poymayu malenkogo sam", "Kusok otrezal", (Note: Album track title "Bespokojnoe vremya".) "Razvlecheniya Ilicha v ssylke"; (Note: Full album title of the track "Razvlecheniya Ilicha v ssylke byli preimushchestvenno sportivnogo kharaktera".)
  - Kontsert – "I vnov prodolzhaetsya boy".
- "Revolyutsiya svershilas" (Note: Album track title "Konkretnaya muzyka #1 Revolyutsiya svershilas".) is the previously unpublished third version of the track (the original is in the album Rodina slyshit).
- The fragment/composition "Gimn", with which the whole Leniniana begins, is actually a reversed anthem of the Tajik SSR, moreover, a post-Stalin version (in the album version, only the third verse sounds with sound distortion of the "beginning").
- Words from "Lenin vidit devochku", "Otdykh Lenina", and "Son Lenina" are found in the children's book Stories about Lenin (Malysh publishing house, 1986) by the author Sergey Alekseev (in the tale "One, Two, Three"). One way or another, they have nothing to do with the film and/or the Lenin in October LP, except for the narrator Vladimir Gertsik.
- While developing the computer game S.T.A.L.K.E.R.: Shadow of Chernobyl by GSC Game World, the album was one of the sources of inspiration for creating the atmosphere of the abandoned Soviet legacy in the Chernobyl Exclusion Zone. Some fragments from the track "Leniniana"—as well as from other albums of Kommunizm—were present in the build version of the game, and, as planned by the developers, were supposed to sound in the in-game Bar 100 Rads. However, for a number of reasons, they were cut from the release version of the game. Subsequently, the files saved in the archives of the game were restored with the help of fan modifications that returned the content cut from the game.
