= Yuri Gulyayev (singer) =

Soviet singer (1930–1986)

Yuri Gulyayev Юрий Гуляев
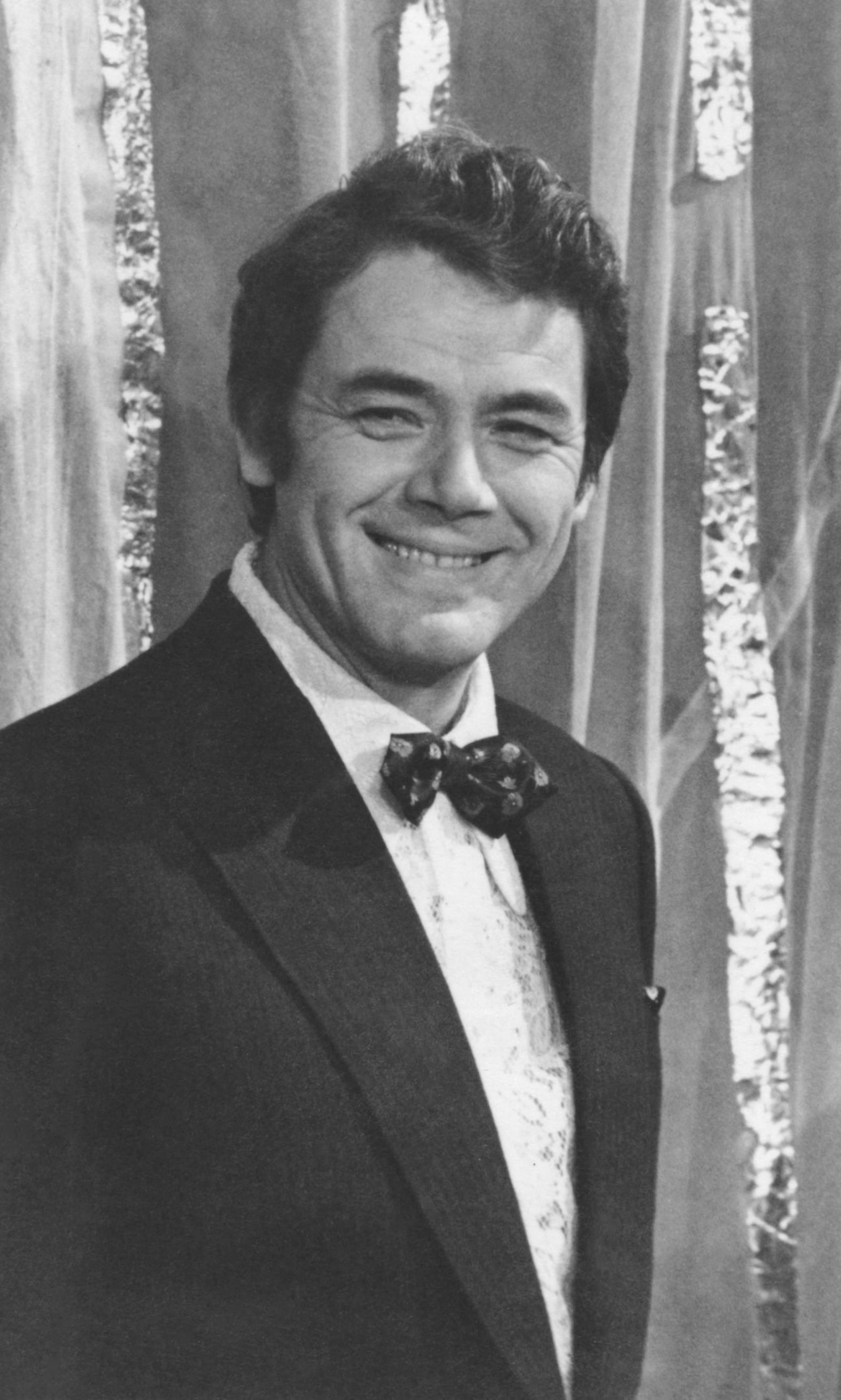
- Gulyayev in 1973

Background information
- Born: Yuri Aleksandrovich Gulyayev; 9 August 1930; Tyumen, Russian SFSR, Soviet Union
- Died: 23 April 1986 (aged 55) Moscow, Russian SFSR, Soviet Union
- Genres: Classical
- Occupations: Singer; songwriter
- Instruments: Singing, accordion

Yuri Aleksandrovich Gulyayev (Note: Russian: Юрий Александрович Гуляев, romanized: Yury Aleksandrovich Gulyayev) (9 August 1930 – 23 April 1986) was a Soviet opera singer from Tyumen, Ural Oblast, RSFSR. The singer's voice was a lyric baritone.

== Career ==
He studied at the Ural State Conservatory in Sverdlovsk. After graduating from the Conservatory, he sang at the Sverdlovsk Opera and Ballet Theater. In 1955, he became a soloist of the State Russian Opera and Ballet Theater in Stalino. Amongst his most notable performances were those at the Bolshoi Theatre in Moscow. The most successful roles are Germont ("La traviata" by G. Verdi), Onegin ("Eugene Onegin" by P. Tchaikovsky), Valentin ("Faust" by C. Gounod), Count Di Luna ("Il trovatore" by G. Verdi), Figaro ("The Barber of Seville" by G. Rossini).

However, the most popular were the singer's performances on the stage (over 200 works). In the late 1960s, the heroic and romantic theme of space exploration was developed in Soviet poetry and music. In 1968, the musical and vocal song cycle "Gagarin's Constellation" (written by Aleksandra Pakhmutova and Nikolai Dobronravov) appeared. The lyric baritone successfully harmonized with the singer's appearance – tall, powerful, with courageous, but soft facial features, with a special, charming smile, which was called "Gagarin's" with the light hand of Joseph Kobzon. According to A. Pakhmutova, "women loved Gulyaev to tears," he received bags of letters from fans. Vocal works such as "The Russian Field", "On the Nameless Height", "My Kiev", "Song of Restless Youth", were especially popular with listeners. the romance "Along the street the snowstorm sweeps", considered folk songs "From behind the island on the Strezhen" and "The Cliff of Stenka Razin", a number of Russian folk songs, in particular "Vdol po Piterskoy".

Gulyayev toured the Soviet Union and abroad a lot: he performed in Austria, Belgium, Bulgaria, Hungary, GDR, Canada, Cuba, Poland, United States, France, Czechoslovakia, Switzerland, Yugoslavia, Japan and other countries. In 1964 he performed at the Olympia in Paris.

During his lifetime, more than 25 records with the singer's recordings were published. Yuri Gulyayev also starred in several movies.

The singer's last recording took place on 12 April 1986, on Cosmonautics Day – it was a teleconference with cosmonauts Solovyov and Kizim, who were in orbit. The singer performed a song "My beloved waved a handkerchief at the gate" to his own accompaniment on the accordion.

He was named a People's Artist of the USSR in 1968. Gulyayev died on 23 April 1986 of heart failure at the age of 55.

== Personal life ==
Gulyayev loved to drive a car. In his spare time, his favorite activities were chess and playing the piano. From literature, he was very fond of the works of Anton Chekhov and Sergei Yesenin.

Wife (since 1960) – Larisa Mikhailovna Gulyaeva – journalist, editor, teacher. Son – Yuri Yuryevich Gulyaev (born 12 December 1964), Candidate of Philosophical Sciences, lecturer at the Faculty of Pedagogical Education of Moscow State University.

He had friendly relations with Muslim Magomayev and Boris Shtokolov.

== Awards ==
- World Festival of Youth and Students (1959)
- Merited Artist of Ukrainian SSR (1960)
- People's Artist of Ukrainian SSR (1965)
- People's Artist of the USSR (1968)
- Order of the Red Banner of Labour (1971)
- USSR State Prize (1975)
- Order of Friendship of Peoples (1976)
- Honorary Citizen of Tyumen (2005)

== Selected songs ==
- Among the Plain Valley
- Do You Know What Kind of Guy He Was
- Do the Russians Want War?
- Embracing the Sky
- From the Island to the Strezhen
- Life, I Love You
- Mezh Vysokikh Khlebov Zateryalosya
- My Kiev
- On the Nameless Height
- Russian Field (song)
- Wait for Me
- Zhuravli
