= Mama (Vitas album) =

Studio album by Vitas
- Released: October 3, 2003
- Recorded: 2002–2003
- Genres: Pop, pop rock, ballad
- Length: 51:38
- Label: Iceberg Music
- Producers: Vitas, Eduard Izmestyev

Vitas chronology
Smile! (Ulybnis) (2002)	Mama (2003)	The Songs of My Mother (Pesni moei mamy) (2003)

Mama (Мама, sometimes translated Mother or Mom) is a Russian album by Vitas, released on 3 October 2003 through Iceberg Music.

== Background ==
Songs from this album featured heavily in the setlist of Vitas' extensive world tour Songs of My Mother (Песни моей мамы), premiered at the State Central Concert Hall "Rossiya" in November 1st and 2nd, 2003, and performed at hundreds of venues in several countries from 2004 to 2006.

The opening track, The Star (Звезда) won a Russian People's HIT prize in 2003 and is one of Vitas' most popular songs worldwide. Like Opera No. 2 (Опера №2), it is still a staple of Vitas' live performances. Vitas sang the song as a duet with Alexander Kireev for his entry into the Star Factory in 2006.

He performed the song Starry River (Звёздная река) accompanied by its composer Aleksandra Pakhmutova on piano at a concert in honour of the composer.

He covered the song The Unknown Friend Song (Песня о неизвестном друге, also known as Extraterrestrial Friend) composed in 1985 by Aleksandra Pakhmutova and Rasul Gamzatov (the poem is translated by Yunna Morits) for the song cycle The Earth Globe (Шар земной, 1985–1987). The song is about an unknown friend that realizes that there is an unknown circle of "invisible and unknown" friends and enemies, as well as "lovable planets" (as per the lyrics), in addition to interstellar and general awareness, brotherhood to the next and an existence of an extraplanetary cycle. (The song addresses the topic of science fiction: brotherhood for humanity in the 3rd millennium and beyond.) It is also subsequently re-edited on Vitas' 2006 CD Return Home. There's also the music score of the song (available on the composer's website) to download. In concert, Vitas often donned an alien robot costume while performing this song.

== Track listing ==
No.	Title	Lyrics	Music	English title	Length
1.	"Звезда"	Dima Plachkovsky	Dima Plachkovsky	The Star	3:32
2.	"Мама"	Vitas	Vitas	Mama	5:02
3.	"Лист осенний"	Plachkovsky	Vitas	An Autumn Leaf	3:45
4.	"Через годы"	Plachkovsky, Rashit Kiyamov	Vitas	Through the Years	3:33
5.	"Птицы улетели"	Viktor Pelenyagre	Aleksandr Kostyuk	The Birds Have Flown Away	3:29
6.	"Посвящение"		Alla Bogolovskaya	Dedication	4:29
7.	"Звёздная река"	Nikolai Dobronravov	Aleksandra Pakhmutova	Starry River	4:08
8.	"Боже, как я люблю"	Svetlana Karabanova	Vitas	God, How I Love	3:47
9.	"Косички"	Karabanova	Vitas	Pigtails	4:44
10.	"Даже звёзды покажутся письмами (Бессонница)"	Karabanova	Vitas	Even the Stars Will Look Like Letters (Insomnia)	4:14
11.	"Extraterrestrial Friend"	Rasul Gamzatov	Pakhmutova	Extraterrestrial Friend	3:58

CD bonus tracks
No.	Title	Lyrics	Music	English title	Length
12.	"Лист осенний" (remix)	Plachkovsky	Vitas	An Autumn Leaf	3:41
13.	"Подожди немного" (with Natalia Prima)	Plachkovsky	Plachkovsky, Vitas	Wait for a While	3:53
14.	"Звезда" (music video)	Plachkovsky	Plachkovsky	The Star	3:40

== Personnel ==
Credits adapted from the original CD's liner notes.

- Sergey Pudovkin – executive producer
- Mikhail Dobrotvorskiy – management
- Dmitriy Dobrotvorskiy – direction
- Eduard Izmestyev – production, arrangement
- Mikhail Grishin – engineering
- Ilya Grebenyuk – keyboards
- Aleksandr Gruzdev – guitar, saxophone
- Rashit Kiyamov – bass guitar
- Rushan Kharryasov – drums, percussion
- Oboz Design Studio – sleeve design
