= Pakhmutov =

Pakhmutov (Russian: Пахмутов) is a Russian masculine surname originating from the given name Pakhmut, its feminine counterpart is Pakhmutova. The surname may refer to

- Aleksandra Pakhmutova (born 1929), Russian composer
  - 1889 Pakhmutova, an asteroid named after Aleksandra Pakhmutova
