= Khronika pikiruyushchego bombardirovshchika =

Studio album by Kommunizm
- Released: 1990, 2002, 2011, 2014
- Studios: GrOb studio, Omsk
- Genres: Psychedelic folk, Musique concrete, Spoken word, A capella, Noise-rock
- Language: Russian
- Labels: Hor, Wyrgorod

Kommunizm chronology
| 13 (1990) | Khronika pikiruyushchego bombardirovshchika (1990) | Blagodat' I-IV (1994) |

Alternative cover
- 2014 CD Reissue cover

Khronika pikiruyushchego bombardirovshchika (Russian: Хроника пикирующего бомбардировщика, lit. 'Chronicles of a Dive Bomber') is the fourteenth and the last studio album by Soviet conceptual band "Kommunizm". it was recorded in 1989 by Egor Letov and Konstantin Ryabinov. The album is considered the best in the entire discography of Kommunizm by the authors themselves.

Songs "Ivanovo detstvo" and "Malenkiy prints vozrashalsya domoy" were re-sung in the album "Pryg-skok" by "Yegor i Opizdenevshiye", as well as song "Tuman" was included in the album "Sto let odinochestva" by the same band.

== Tracklist and credits ==
| No. | Title | Length |
|---|---|---|
| 1. | "Туман (Tuman)" | 3:13 |
| 2. | "Приключения медвежонка Ниды (Priklucheniya medvezhonka Nidi)" | 0:32 |
| 3. | "The Birds Of Paradise" | 2:41 |
| 4. | "Иваново детство (Ivanovo detstvo)" | 5:18 |
| 5. | "Повесть о настоящем человеке (Povest o nastoyaschem cheloveke)" | 4:09 |
| 6. | "Пять мальчиков (Pyat' malchikov)" | 0:12 |
| 7. | "Белый свет (Belyy svet)" | 3:07 |
| 8. | "Маленький принц возвращался домой (Malenkiy prints vozrashalsya domoy)" | 5:00 |
| 9. | "Нюркина песня (Nurkina pesnya)" | 3:54 |
| 10. | "Засиделся за костром (Zasidelsya za kostrom)" | 0:51 |
| 11. | "Про мальчика, невидимый трамвай и веточку (Pro malchika, nevidimiy tramvay i vetochku)" | 1:54 |
| 12. | "Говна-пирога (Govna-piroga)" | 3:47 |
| 13. | "Сад (Sad)" | 4:19 |
| 14. | "Про Покупку (Pro pokupku)" | 1:02 |
| 15. | "Ничего не вижу (Nichego ne vizhu)" | 2:26 |
| 16. | "Как в мясной избушке помирала душа (Kak v myasnoi izbuschke pomirala dusha)" | 7:43 |
| 17. | "Хроника пикирующего бомбардировщика (Khronika pikiruyushchego bombardirovshchika)" | 3:12 |

=== Participants of the recording ===
- Egor Letov - vocals, guitars, glockenspiel, drums, bass, backing vocals
- Yanka Dyagileva - vocals, acoustic guitar, glockenspiel (7, 15, 16)
- Konstantin Ryabinov - vocals, guitars, bass, bow, horn, glockenspiel (10)
- Anna Volkova - vocals (9, 13)
- Igor Zhevtun - acoustic guitar, Solovushka synthesizer (7)
- Sergey Zelensky - bass (15), cymbals, bell, glockenspiel, electric guitar
- Dmitry Selivanov - vocals and acoustic guitar (3)
- Arkady Klimkin - drums (8)
- Evgeny Lishchenko - bongos (3)

Recorded in GrOb studio by Egor Letov in 18-28 December 1989.
