= Tenderness (Soviet song) =

1965 song composed by Aleksandra Pakhmutova

Song by Maya Kristalinskaya

from the album Lyrical Songs
- B-side: "Is It All For Me Alone"
- Written: 1966
- Released: 1966
- Genre: Soviet estrada
- Label: Melodiya
- Composer: Aleksandra Pakhmutova
- Lyricists: Sergei Grebennikov, Nikolai Dobronravov

"Tenderness" (Russian: Нежность) is a Soviet Russian song, composed in 1965. The music was written by Aleksandra Pakhmutova, with lyrics by Nikolai Dobronravov and Sergey Grebennikov.

"Tenderness" was one of the most beloved songs from cosmonaut of the USSR, and the most beloved — the first cosmonaut of the planet Earth — Yuri Gagarin. Yevgeny Dolmatovsky recalled in the book "Stories about your songs" (1973):

"Tenderness" is like a spell of a woman, a friend of the pilot, who released her beloved to the stars and is waiting for his return. The source of the song is the hour and a half that it took Yuri Gagarin to fly around the globe, the hours and minutes that other cosmonauts and <test-pilot> Georgy Mosolov spent on daring flights. It is not by chance that the poets Grebennikov and Dobronravov remembered Exupéry. One of the first to talk ably about the experiences and feelings of a man who has gained wings, this dreamer and warrior, and cosmonauts, including Yuri Gagarin, often told poets: write about Exupéry!
In order for a song to be born and turned out, many circumstances, impressions, finds are needed. It is important to remember that Yuri Gagarin brought the authors to the song "Tenderness". He loved this song very much, sang it together with his comrades, specially went to listen — so that not on the radio, not on TV, but here, next to it, it sounded.

Nezhnost' was performed in 1967 by Tatiana Doronina (as Nyura) in Tatiana Lioznova's film Tri topolya na Plyushchikhe (Three Poplars at Plyuschikha Street). Originally it was recorded by Maya Kristalinskaya in 1966. According to the memoirs of Chermen Kasaev (music editor of Radio in the Soviet Union and Soviet Central Television), when listening to a final record, Maya had tears dripping from her eyes. B. Serebrennikova wrote in the book "Singers of Soviet Pop" (1977) that "All critics who wrote about "Tenderness" noted that this is the pinnacle of Kristalinskaya's art and in general a masterpiece of song performance creativity."

It was covered many times by many artists in Soviet Union and Russia, including versions made by Yuri Gulyayev, Joseph Kobzon, Tamara Sinyavskaya, Lyudmila Zykina, Dmitri Hvorostovsky, Tamara Gverdtsiteli, Maria Codrianu, Latvian singer Olga Pīrāgs. Also, the song was recorded in 1967 by French singer Frida Boccara in Russian (Soviet album «Поёт Фрида Боккара» / Frida Boccara sings, Melodiya), in 1969 by Cuban singer Lourdes Gil and Francis Goya (as Tenderness — CD album A Tribute... With My Sincere Admiration for Alexandra Pakhmutova, 2002). The song has been live performed in 1999 by Alla Bayanova in French, accompanied by Mikhail Pletnev.

Several Western arrangements of the tune are known under the title Tenderness. These include a version in both English and Russian by Jason Kouchak and in particular, Marc Almond's version which is known for his live performance at the Manege of the First Cadet Corps (Saint Petersburg) on October 1, 2008 and Thomas Anders' version is known for his live performance at the Kremlin Palace on April 23, 2009.

In the special season of the Russian vocal competition "Ну-ка, все вместе! Хором!" (All Together Now! Choirs), which premiered on February 2, 2024, the performance of "Nezhnost" (Tenderness) by the Dmitry Zheleznov Capella emerged as a definitive highlight. During the episode aired on February 16, 2024, the ensemble presented a sophisticated choral arrangement of Aleksandra Pakhmutova's 1965 masterpiece. Their rendition captivated the "Wall" of 100 judges, earning a perfect score of 100 points and securing their place in the grand finale held on March 8, 2024. This performance was specifically lauded for its technical precision and emotional resonance, demonstrating how a Soviet-era classic—originally popularised by singers like Maya Kristalinskaya—could be revitalised through contemporary vocal artistry for a modern televised audience.
