= My Dear (disambiguation) =

My Dear is a 2007 album by New Years Day.

My Dear may also refer to:

- My Dear (British horse), British Thoroughbred racehorse
- My Dear III, American Thoroughbred racehorse
- "My Dear", a 2019 song by Aṣa from her album Lucid
- "My Dear", a 2019 song by South Korean singer Chen from his EP Dear My Dear
- "My Dear", Russian song by Nikolai Ivanovich Kharito
