= Tuman (song) =

Song by Kommunizm and Egor i Opizdenevshie

from the album Khronika pikiruyushchego bombardirovshchika and Sto let odinochestva
- Language: Russian
- Released: 1990 (KhPB); 1993 (SLO)
- Recorded: 18 December 1989, GrOb Studios
- Genre: Folk rock, neopsychedelia
- Length: 3:15
- Label: GrOb Records
- Composer(s): Kim Ryzhov
- Lyricist(s): Alexander Kolker
- Producer(s): Yegor Letov

"Tuman", meaning "fog" in Russian, is a song by the Russian band Kommunizm. It was released in 1990.

== History ==
The song was written by Alexander Kolker in 1967 for the soundtrack to the film Chronicles of a Dive Bomber.

In 1989, the Russian poet Yegor Letov recorded a version for his band Kommunizm's album Khronika pikiruyushchego bombardirovshchika. It appears twice on the album: once as track 1, and the second time as track 17, as an instrumental titled "Chronicles of a Dive Bomber". Before the 2011 LP reissue of Chronicles of a Dive Bomber, the title track faded out at the 1:53 mark, but it was restored to its natural length on the LP, revealing some previously-hidden vocals. It was faded out again on the 2014 version, however this time, ten seconds of silence were placed at the end

From 1991 to 1992, when Egor i Opizdenevshie's second album Sto let odinochestva was being recorded, Letov listened to "Tuman" and thought the recording from KPB was good enough to include on the album, so it was put on.

Letov has frequently played "Tuman" live at his solo acoustic concerts. One such recording appears as a bonus track on the 2010 CD reissue of the Grazhdanskaya Oborona album Zvezdopad (2002). The rendition appearing on the reissue was recorded live in Barnaul on 14 December 2003. It was also included on the 2011 vinyl reissue of the 2010 reissue.

On the recorded version appearing on Chronicles of a Dive Bomber and Sto let odinochestva, Kuzma UO can be heard shouting "Blyad" in reverse at the beginning and says something else at the end. According to Letov, it was because Kuzma was taping and told Letov, who was the drummer in the session, to start and stop. Waugh was in the GrOb studio control room while Letov was in the recording space.

The 1989 recording also appears on the 1990 Kommunizm compilation "Trinadtsat", in a backmasked version called "Manut" and in the instrumental version as "Vozdushnye rabochnie voiny".

== Personnel ==
- Kuzma UO in guitar, bass, tape loops
- Yegor Letov in vocals, drums
