= Song of Restless Youth =

Song
- Language: Russian
- Released: 1958
- Composer: Aleksandra Pakhmutova
- Lyricist: Lev Oshanin

The Song of Restless Youth (Russian: Песня о тревожной молодости, Pesnya o trevozhnoi molodosti) is a Soviet song written in 1958 by composer Aleksandra Pakhmutova with lyrics by Lev Oshanin. It was composed for the film On the Other Side (Russian: По ту сторону, Po tu storonu), directed by Fyodor Filippov and based on the novel of the same name by Viktor Kin. The film is set in the years following the Russian Civil War and depicts the experiences of young Komsomol members in the 1920s.

The song is performed in the film and reflects themes common to Soviet songs of the period, including commitment to collective ideals and endurance in difficult conditions. Its musical structure combines a lyrical vocal line with a steady, march-like rhythm, a style frequently used in Soviet patriotic and mass songs of the late 1950s.

For the film, Pakhmutova also wrote four additional songs with lyrics by Oshanin, along with orchestral music for the soundtrack. After the film’s release, Song of Restless Youth began to be performed independently in concerts and broadcasts. It entered the repertoire of professional singers and state ensembles and was recorded by performers such as Yuri Gulyayev.

From the late Soviet period onward, the song acquired an enduring symbolic association with service and duty in Russia. After Sergey Shoigu became head of the Ministry of Emergency Situations of Russia in 1994, it came to be regarded as the organization’s unofficial anthem and has since been regularly performed at official ceremonies, commemorative events, and concerts connected with emergency and rescue services.

== Lyrics ==
Russian original

Забота у нас простая,
Забота наша такая:
Жила бы страна родная, —
И нету других забот.

Припев:
И снег, и ветер,
И звёзд ночной полёт…
Меня моё сердце
В тревожную даль зовёт.

Пускай нам с тобой обоим
Беда грозит за бедою,
Но дружбу мою с тобою
Одна только смерть возьмёт.

Припев

Пока я ходить умею,
Пока глядеть я умею,
Пока я дышать умею,
Я буду идти вперёд.

Припев

Не надобно нам покоя,
Судьбою счастлив такою.
Ты пламя берёшь рукою,
Дыханьем ломаешь лёд.

Припев

И так же, как в жизни каждый,
Любовь ты встретишь однажды.
С тобою, как ты, отважно
Сквозь бури она пойдёт.

Припев

Romanization of Russian

Zabota u nas prostaya,
Zabota nasha takaya:
Zhilá by strana rodnaya, —
I netu drugikh zabot.

Pripev:
I sneg, i veter,
I zvyozd nochnoi polyot…
Menya moyo serdtse
V trevozhnuyu dal’ zovyot.

Puskai nam s toboi oboim
Beda grozit za bedoyu,
No druzhbu moyu s toboyu
Odna tol’ko smert’ voz’mot.

Pripev

Poka ya khodit’ umeyu,
Poka glyadet’ ya umeyu,
Poka ya dyshat’ umeyu,
Ya budu idti vperyod.

Pripev

Ne nadobno nam pokoya,
Sud’boyu schastliv takoyu.
Ty plamya beryosh’ rukoyu,
Dykhan’yem lomayesh’ lyod.

Pripev

I tak zhe, kak v zhizni kazhdy,
Lyubov’ ty vstretish’ odnazhdy.
S toboyu, kak ty, otvazhno
Skvoz’ buri ona poydyot.

Pripev

English translation

Our concern is simple,
Our concern is this:
That our native land may live —
We have no other cares.

Chorus:
And snow, and wind,
And the flight of night stars…
My heart calls me
To the troubled distance.

Though trouble after trouble
May threaten us both,
Only death will take
My friendship with you.

Chorus

As long as I can walk,
As long as I can see,
As long as I can breathe,
I will move forward.

Chorus

We do not need rest,
I am happy with such a fate.
You take the flame in your hand,
And break the ice with your breath.

Chorus

And just as everyone in life,
You will one day meet love.
With you, as brave as you are,
Through the storms it will go.

Chorus

== See also ==
- Aleksandra Pakhmutova
- Lev Oshanin
- Soviet songs
