= Yak tebe ne liubyty, Kyieve mii! =

1962 song with lyrics by Dmytro Lutsenko performed by Yuri Aleksandrovich Gulyayev

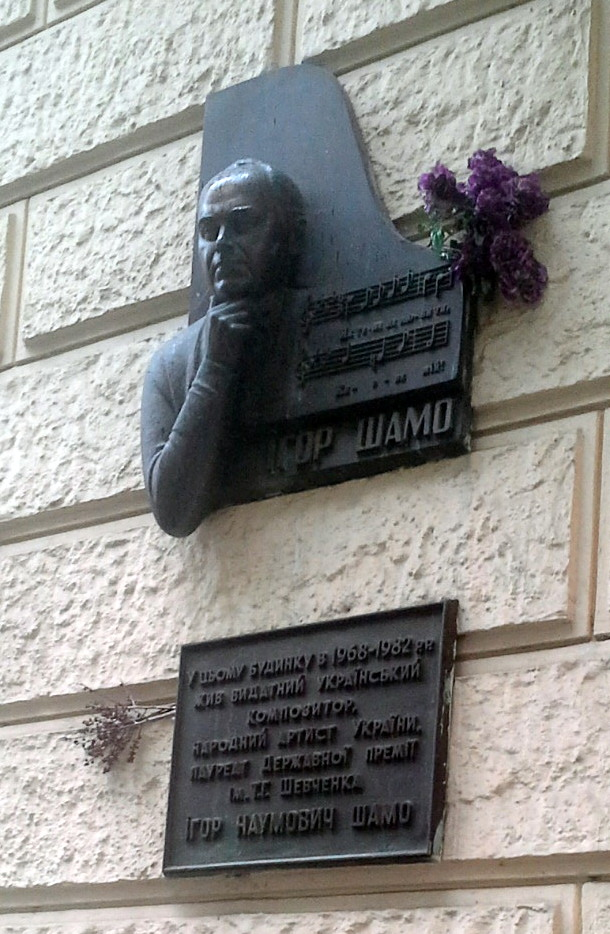
Memorial plaque of Ihor Shamo in Kyiv with his notes to the song

Mass performance of the song on Kyiv Day in 2015

"Yak tebe ne liubyty, Kyieve mii!" (Ukrainian: «Як тебе не любити, Києве мій!», lit. 'How can I not love you, Kyiv of mine!') is a lyrical song written by Kyiv composer Ihor Shamo with lyrics by poet Dmytro Lutsenko. At first the song was performed in 1962 in duet by Yuriy Gulyayev and Kostiantyn Ohnievyi who at that time performed at Kyiv Opera Theatre.

After over half a century later, in 2014 the song became the official anthem of Kyiv city.

== Lyrics ==
Ukrainian	Ukrainian Latin alphabet	Rough translation
Грає море зелене, Тихий день догора. Дорогими для мене Стали схили Дніпра, Де колишуться віти Закоханих мрій... Як тебе не любити, Києве мій! В очі дивляться канни, Серце в них переллю. Хай розкажуть коханій, Як я вірно люблю. Буду мріяти й жити На крилах надій... Як тебе не любити, Києве мій! Спить натомлене місто Мирним, лагідним сном. Ген вогні, як намисто, Розцвіли над Дніпром. Вечорів оксамити, Мов щастя прибій... Як тебе не любити, Києве мій!	Hraie more zelene, Tykhyi den dohora. Dorohymy dlia mene Staly skhyly Dnipra, De kolyshutsia vity Zakokhanykh mrii... Yak tebe ne liubyty, Kyieve mii! V ochi dyvliatsia kanny, Sertse v nykh perelliu. Khai rozkazhut kokhanii, Yak ya virno liubliu. Budu mriiaty i zhyty Na krylakh nadii... Yak tebe ne liubyty, Kyieve mii! Spyt natomlene misto Myrnym, lahidnym snom. Hen vohni, yak namysto, Roztsvily nad Dniprom. Vechoriv oksamyty, Mov shchastia prybii... Yak tebe ne liubyty, Kyieve mii!	The green sea is playing, A quiet day is fading away, So dear have they become for me, the sloping banks of Dnipro. Where branches are swaying of amorous dreams... How can one not love you, Kyiv, my dear! Into my eyes the cannas are gazing, I will pour my heart into them. Let them tell to my beloved one, How I faithfully love her. Now, I will dream and live On the wings of my hopes... How can one not love you, Kyiv, my dear! My weary city is falling in a peaceful and gentle sleep. There, as a necklace, lights Have bloomed over the Dnieper. The velvet of late afternoons Surfs over as euphoria. How can one not love you, Kyiv, my dear!

== In popular culture ==
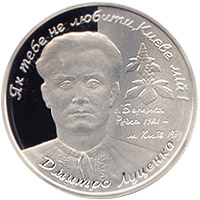
Commemorative coin with a face of Dmytro Lutsenko and name of his poem, issued in 2006

In 2006, the National Bank of Ukraine issued a commemorative two-hryvnia coin dedicated to the 85th anniversary of the birth of the song’s lyricist, Dmytro Lutsenko. Around the edge of the coin’s reverse side is the stylized inscription: “How can one not love you, my Kyiv!”

In 2012, Ukrposhta issued an unstamped envelope to mark the 50th anniversary of the writing of the song “How can one not love you, my Kyiv.”

In 2012, at the Ivan Franko National Theater, director Oleksandra Bilozuba staged a play of the same name on the Chamber Stage, in which dramatic actors performed songs and poems dedicated to Kyiv accompanied by an orchestra.

On November 13, 2014, deputies of the Kyiv City Council unanimously supported the decision to approve “How can one not love you, my Kyiv” as the city anthem.

During the celebration of Kyiv Day on May 30, 2015, about 3,000 participants together with Mayor Vitali Klitschko took part in setting a nationwide record for the largest performance of this song at Sofiiska Square. The “Kyiv Classic” pop-symphony orchestra accompanied the performance.

A fragment of the song’s melody was played on the chimes at Maidan Nezalezhnosti and on the building of the Institute of History of Ukraine of the National Academy of Sciences of Ukraine; it was also played every quarter to the hour on the bell tower of the Greek Church at Kontraktova Square. The melody can also be heard at Kyiv’s main railway station upon the arrival or departure of express or high-speed trains.
