= Vitas =

Russian–Ukrainian singer (born 1979)

Vitas Витас
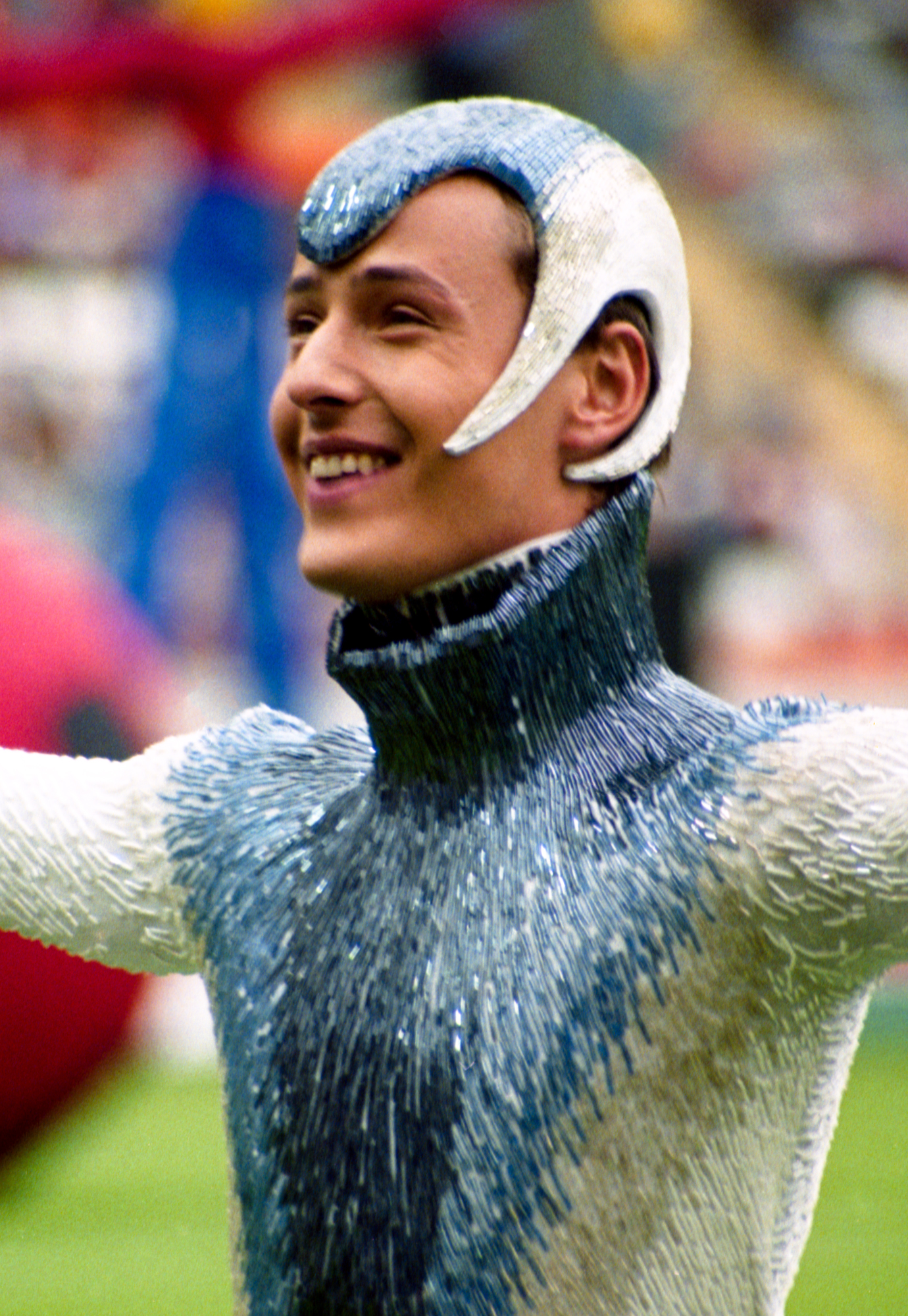
- Vitas in 2002

Background information
- Also known as: Vitalik; Vitas
- Born: Vitaly Vladasovich Grachev; 19 February 1979 (age 47); Daugavpils, Latvian SSR, Soviet Union
- Origin: Odesa, Ukraine
- Genres: Operatic pop; orchestral pop; techno; pop; dance-pop; folk-pop; synth-pop; electroclash; alternative rock
- Occupations: Singer; songwriter
- Instruments: Vocals; accordion
- Years active: 2000–present
- Labels: Iceberg Music; CD Land; Квадро-Диск; CICAC; KHAM; Gemini Sun Records; Universal Music Taiwan; Никитин; Media Land; Creative Media; Monatomic Music; 反正靠谱

Vitaliy Vladasovich Grachev (Note: Russian: Виталий Владасович Грачёв, romanized: Vitaliy Vladasovich Grachyov) or Vitaliy Vladasovych Grachov, (Note: Ukrainian: Віталій Владасович Грачов, romanized: Vitalii Vladasovych Hrachov. On Vitas' Ukrainian driver's license, his surname was legally transliterated as Grachov as opposed to the regular spelling Hrachov) known professionally as Vitas (Russian: Витас [ˈvʲitəs]; stylised in all caps; born 19 February 1979), is a Latvia-born Ukrainian and Russian singer. Vitas is known for his falsetto and his eclectic musical style, which incorporates elements of operatic pop, techno, dance, classical, jazz, and folk.

Vitas became popular in Russia and other Eastern European countries in the early 2000s and also achieved success in Asia, including China, in 2005. He won the ZD Awards and participated in many Russian and European music festivals, including the festival “Christmas Meetings of Alla Pugacheva” and others. He performed in a duet with Demis Roussos and Lucio Dalla.

Much of his recognition outside Russia and Asia came in the 2010s, when songs such as "Opera #2" and "The 7th Element" (both from his 2001 debut album Philosophy of Miracle) and "Smile!" (from his 2002 album of the same name) achieved viral success; the unusual music videos for "Opera #2" and "The 7th Element" have been cited as the most prominent examples of this.

Vitas has performed with entertainment labels such as Universal Music Group, and has toured extensively in several countries. He designs his own stage costumes, and employs a backing band named DIVA during live performances.

== Early life ==
Vitaliy Vladasovich Grachev was born in Daugavpils, which was then in the Latvian Soviet Socialist Republic, on 19 February 1979. He moved with his parents to Ukraine, where he was raised in Odesa. In an interview to Ukrainian website Fakty in 2012, Grachev claimed that Vitas was his official first name on his birth certificate. At the age of 16, he officially changed his first name to the name's Ukrainian version Vitaliy.

Vitas has Russian, Lithuanian and Ashkenazi Jewish roots. He is the son of costume designer Lilia Mihailovna Gracheva who was Russian and musician Vladas Arkadevich Grachev-Marantzman who was of ethnic Lithuanian and Ashkenazi Jewish origin. His paternal grandfather, Arkadiy Davydovich Marantzman, who sang in an army choir, was Ashkenazi Jewish while his paternal grandmother was of ethnic Lithuanian descent. (Note: It is often reported that Vitas' paternal grandmother was Latvian. However, in an interview to Channel One Russia, Vitas referred to his paternal grandmother as a "true-blood ethnic Lithuanian".) Arkadiy Marantzman served in the Soviet army during World War II. Vitas showed an interest in music from an early age; his grandfather taught him to play the accordion at the age of 5. He later said that he had composed at least 1,000 songs by the age of 12. He attended an art school in Odesa from the age of seven, and appeared in various theatrical productions as a teenager.

He took the name Vitas in his teen years as he found "Vitaliy Grachev" sounded too long. He regularly clashed with his father about his late night rehearsing habits. His father threatened to report him to the police. At the age of 21, Vitas and his 15-year-old girlfriend and future wife Svetlana crossed the border into Russia on a train without Svetlana having proper documentation. They lived in poverty before Vitas received public attention for his music.

== Career ==
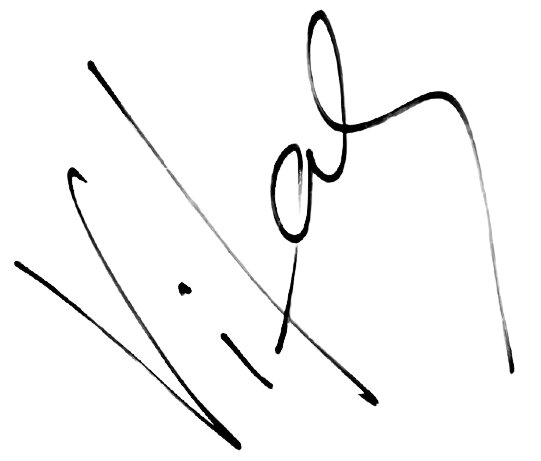
Vitas' signature

=== 1999–2005: Breakthrough in Russia, Philosophy of Miracle and Songs of My Mother ===
After being rejected from a musical college in his native Odesa, his family did not have the money to send him to a private institution. As a result, Vitas, already using the name as a pseudonym, started performing at night clubs. He initially started his career as a Michael Jackson tribute act, but also performed parodies and his own songs. He also sold leftover bread from stores on the street as well as offering his services as a photographer. At night clubs, he had acts involving dancing, singing, comedy and magic tricks, including spoon bending. He worked as an actor in an experimental theatre. He applied to perform with his own songs at the 1997 edition of Chervona ruta festival, but was rejected as his repertoire lacked songs in Ukrainian. In 1999, Odesan regional television station Elan shot a music video for his song "Opera #1", which they recorded in Odesa.

During one of his night club performances, where he performed "Opera #2", he was spotted by a Russian producer who recommended that he move to Moscow, which he had already considered in 1998–1999. During a play at the experimental theatre, he was spotted by producer Sergey Pudovkin, whom he gifted a cassette of his song. A week later, Vitas and Svetlana left Odesa.

With Pudovkin, Vitas starting working on his debut for the Russian audience. He started working for youth channel TV-6. They recorded a music video for "Opera #2", in which Vitas portrayed an eccentric lonely man with fish gills who lives in a bathtub with jars of fish and plays the accordion naked. The music video premiered in December 2000 and received wide public attention. Vitas started performing the song with artificial gills, which let the Russian media compare him to Ichthyander, a character in the novel Amphibian Man.

On February 27, 2001, Vitas premiered his solo concert show "Opera #...", in an abridged form, at the "Russia" Concert Hall in Moscow. Performed as a teaser for the first leg of his "Philosophy of Miracle" tour, the show was filmed by TV-6 and later broadcast as part of the music program "Наша музыка". Although not well documented, official sources recall that the tour began on April 7, 2001, presumably in Naro-Fominsk. Other sources confirm that the tour had already started by March 2001. During that first tour, Vitas performed not only in concert halls, but also on TV shows, festivals, stadiums, casino halls and nightclubs. In March 2002, Vitas made his first tour in the United States of America.

On March 29, 2002, Vitas premiered the second leg of his "Philosophy of Miracle" concert tour with a concert at the State Kremlin Palace in Moscow. The concert was filmed by Channel One Russia and later released on DVD.

In late 2002, Vitas received an invitation from Lucio Dalla, the composer of "Caruso", to perform this song together with him at the "Sanremo in Moscow" concert in the State Kremlin Palace on November 23, 2002. Mr. Dalla then invited Vitas to come to Rome to take part in the rehearsals of Toska, a modern version of Puccini's opera.

In dedication to his mother who died in 2001, Vitas released two albums: "Mama" and "The Songs of My Mother". The latter included classic Soviet songs which were the favourite of Vitas' late mother. During the process of recording the album, Vitas befriended Soviet and Russian composer Alexandra Pakhmutova, who featured in his music video for her song "The Bird of Happiness".

On October 21, 2003, Vitas ended his first concert tour "Philosophy of Miracle" with its last gig in Kaliningrad.

On November 1, 2003, Vitas presented his second concert tour with the show "The Songs of My Mother" in the "Russia" Concert Hall in Moscow. Compared to the flamboyant nature of his previous Philosophy of Miracle tour, The Songs of My Mother was more conservative, drawing on classic Russian songs. From 2004 to 2006, Vitas' management, the "Pudovkin" Production Center continued "The Songs of My Mother" tour in Russia and the United States, Germany, Kazakhstan, Israel and the Baltic states.

In addition to his singing career, Vitas also starred in a murder mystery television series called "Сволочь ненаглядная" ("Beloved Scoundrel"), in which he played a pop singer with an unusually high voice. He also starred in a comedy called Crazy Day.

=== 2006–2014: Asian success, Return Home and films ===
In June 2006, Vitas was invited by China Central Television to take part in a grand event entitled The Year of Russia in China in Beijing. Vitas performed two songs, "The Star" and "Opera #2" during the event, marking the beginning of his popularity in China.

Vitas' Return Home tour, beginning in 2006, had a conservative atmosphere similar to the Songs of My Mother tour. The concert performed in Saint Petersburg on 4 March 2007 was later released on DVD on Vitas' website, as well as officially in some countries, albeit with many songs removed. The full concert in Moscow was later released on DVD.

In October 2007, Vitas was signed with now-defunct American label Gemini Sun Records. Gemini Sun released the Audio Visual Connect Series Vitas compilation CD + DVD set featuring eight music videos with the corresponding songs also on audio CD, in addition to a bonus audio track. In 2008, Vitas also released "Light of A New Day", a 40-minute track of non-lyrical vocalization and instrumentation. The song is available as a free download on his website.

The Sleepless Night tour included concerts in China and more elaborate presentations than the more conservative Return Home program. Vitas performed his Return Home concert in Bucharest, Romania on 25 February 2009. The concert was broadcast on the Romanian TVR2 and TVRi television networks, achieving their highest ratings in twelve months. A benefit concert, with Vitas performing "The Star", was held on 12 May 2009 in Sichuan province in memory of the victims of the previous year's earthquake there; a song known as "Mommy and Son" was released in late October 2009 in remembrance of the victims. It was the very first title track of the Mommy and Son album (released 1 September 2011), which included new songs, such as "C'est La Vie" (French for "Such is life"), "Once More", "Let the Father Teach!", "Young Rook" and others.

Vitas played the role of Gude in the Chinese film Mulan, which premiered in Beijing on 16 November 2009. He recorded music for the film's soundtrack.

In early 2011, Vitas performed a series of seven Sleepless Night concerts in New York City, Toronto, Chicago, Miami, Vancouver, Los Angeles, and San Francisco. Later that year, he played the role of Bolshevik Comintern official Grigori Voitinsky in the Chinese propaganda film The Founding of a Party. He also starred with Huang Shengyi in the musical A Night to Be a Star. In March 2011, Vitas' concert tour "Mommy and Son" started in several cities of Russia. His large-scale concert at the Palace of Arts "Ukraina" in Kyiv in March 2012 was broadcast in Ukraine's main TV channels and later released in DVD. In 2013 he brought the tour to Germany, performing in several cities.

In 2012, Vitas was a guest star on several Russian talk shows, including Let Them Talk, where he was interviewed for the first time on Russian television after hiding himself from the press for about a decade.

=== 2015–present: Bit Bombit ===
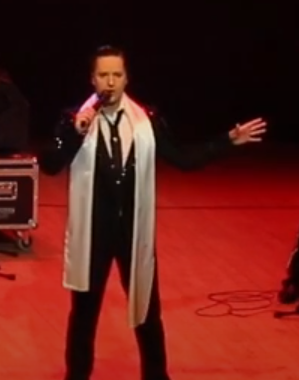
Vitas in 2015.

In 2019, Vitas released his fifteenth album Bit Bombit. He celebrated his 20th anniversary as an artist starting with a new concert tour in April 2019 in Moscow, while appearing at Evening Urgant on the day of his 40th birthday. He collaborated with Australian musician and DJ Timmy Trumpet on the song "The King" and performed with him at the Belgian rave festival Tomorrowland. In August 2020, Vitas' 20th anniversary EP OPERA20 was released in China. The album contained songs in English, Russian, and Chinese, as well as a collaboration with Chinese singer Elvis Wang. 1,000 limited edition vinyl copies were issued.

Following the COVID-19 pandemic, Vitas' touring abroad stopped and for a while, he solely performed in Russia. Since March 2022, he has withdrawn from performing publicly and focused mostly on his family.

== Incidents ==
Vitas is also known in Russia for several high-profile incidents, following the investigations of which he had to face criminal and administrative liability. For example, in 2003, a criminal case was initiated against him under Part 4 of Article 222 of the Russian Criminal Code (illegal arms trafficking). However, according to the prosecutor, the case against Grachev was closed due to his active repentance.

=== Traffic accident ===
On May 10, 2013, in Moscow, Grachev hit a cyclist, Olga Kholodova, with his car near the VVC (All-Russian Exhibition Center). After being taken to the police station, the singer handed over a Makarov pistol mockup to the officers. A video recording was released showing Vitas kicking one of the police officers and using obscene language against the operatives. During the investigation, it was revealed that in 2007, Grachev had been stripped of his driving license for 23 months by a Russian court for driving under the influence. In 2008, as a Ukrainian citizen, Grachev obtained a new driver's license from Ukraine but again violated traffic rules by driving into the oncoming lane. On May 27, Grachev was stripped of his driving license for 1.5 years by a magistrate of the Ostaninsky district of Moscow for refusing to undergo a medical examination under Part 1 of Article 12.26 of the Administrative Code of the Russian Federation; on July 18, Grachev was formally charged with using violence against a representative of authority. During the investigation, Grachev fully admitted his guilt and cooperated with the investigation. On August 26, 2013, the Ostaninsky court in Moscow found the singer guilty of committing a crime under Article 318 of the Russian Criminal Code and fined him 100,000 rubles for the incident involving the police officer.

=== Shooting incident ===
On March 21, 2018, Grachev fired a starting pistol in the courtyard of his house in the village of Barvikha on Rublyovka. The shooting continued for five hours and caused concerns among his neighbors. When police officers arrived, Vitas refused to open the door and continued shooting. As a result, the police broke down the door and took the singer to the police station, where an administrative protocol was drawn up against him. Grachev refused to undergo an alcohol intoxication test. During the inspection of his property, 45 shell casings, four cartridges, and a signal pistol were found. According to the singer's neighbors, this was not the first such shooting incident he had organized in his courtyard.

On March 27, 2018, the Odintsovo city court sentenced Grachev to seven days of arrest under Article 20.1 of the Administrative Code (petty hooliganism), which he served in the Istrinsky special reception center; he had previously been fined 500 rubles.

=== Conflict in a karaoke club ===
On October 23, 2022, in Moscow, at a karaoke club on Sadovaya-Kudrinskaya Street, Grachev got into a fight with an official from one of the federal ministries, made a remark using obscene language, and sprayed pepper spray into the official's eyes. The conflict was broken up by security. Vitas quickly left, while the official went to a trauma center where he was diagnosed with chemical eye burns. The injured official filed a complaint with the police. A criminal case was initiated against Vitas for causing minor harm to health. During the investigation, the case was closed due to the reconciliation of the parties.

== Personal life ==
Vitas is a dual Ukrainian–Russian citizen, possessing two passports.

He married his longterm girlfriend Svetlana Grankovska in 2006 in Odesa in a private ceremony solely attended by family members. In 2008, their first daughter Alla was born, followed by their son Maksim in 2015. In 2021, their third child, a daughter named Alisa, was born.

During the early 2000s, Vitas was often guarded in interactions with the media and seldom gave interviews. His producer Sergey Pudovkin actively tried to block opportunities for interviewers and journalists to talk to Vitas. In 2003, Channel One Russia show Good Morning held a rare interview with Vitas on his career. Vitas became more open towards the press in the early 2010s, holding his first in-depth interview in January 2012 on the Russian talk show Let Them Talk while showing his wife and daughter publicly for the first time.

Subsequently, he appeared on the Channel One Russia show Everybody Is at Home. Later that year, he appeared on the show again to address a man's allegations that he was Vitas's biological father. After much backlash from friends and family, and the man's admission of lying, the DNA results proved that he was not Vitas's father. To show that he had no hard feelings, Vitas sang and danced with the man's mother on the show.

== Backing band ==
=== Current members ===
- Maxim Musatov – keyboards, backing vocals (2019–present)
- Valeriy Sukhov – bass guitar, backing vocals (2025–present)
- Egor Glukhov – drums (2025–present)

=== Former members ===
- Aleksandr Gruzdev – guitar, saxophone, backing vocals (2001–2026)
- [unknown] – guitar, backing vocals (2014–2015)
- Vasiliy Musatov – keyboards (2004–2019)
- Ilya "G.IL.V" Grebenyuk – keyboards (2001–2003)
- Aleksey Rostov – keyboards (2003)
- Andrey Artemov – bass guitar, backing vocals (2007–2015)
- Rashit Kyamov – bass guitar, backing vocals (2001–2007, 2015–2016)
- Rushan Harryasov – drums (2001–2012)
- Aleksandr Illin – bass guitar, backing vocals (2016–2025)
- Yaroslav Andreev – drums (2012–2025)

== Discography ==
=== Studio albums ===
Russian	English	Year
Философия чуда	Philosophy of Miracle	2001
Улыбнись	Smile!	2002
Мама	Mama	2003
Песни моей мамы	The Songs of My Mother	2003
Поцелуй длиною в вечность	A Kiss as Long as Eternity	2004
Возвращение домой	Return Home	2006
Криком журавлиным. Возвращение домой, Часть 2	Crane's Crying: Return Home, Part 2	2007
Хиты ХХ века	20th Century Hits	2008
**	Audio Visual Connect Series: Vitas (CD + DVD)	2008
Скажи, что ты любишь	Say You Love	2009
Шедевры трех веков	Masterpieces of Three Centuries	2010
Романсы	Romances	2011
Мама и Сын	Mother and Son	2011
Только ты. История моей любви, Часть 1	Only You: My Love Story, Part 1	2013
Я подарю тебе весь мир. История моей любви, Часть 2	I'll Give You the World: My Love Story, Part 2	2014
**	Come Just For You!	2016
**	Made in China	2016
Бит бомбит	Bit Bombit	2019

=== DVDs ===
Russian	English	Year
Витас в Кремле	Vitas at the Kremlin	2002
Песни моей мамы	The Songs Of My Mother	2003
Лучшее от Витаса на DVD	The Best from Vitas on DVD	2007
Возвращение Домой в Санкт-Петербурге	Return Home in Saint Petersburg	2007
Возвращение домой в Москва	Return Home in Moscow	2007
Бессонная ночь Петербург	Sleepless Night in Saint Petersburg	2010
Две столицы	Two Capitals	2011
Лучшее от Витаса на DVD (2)	The Best from Vitas on DVD (2)	2011
Мама и сын	Mommy and Son	2013
Лучшее от Витаса на DVD (3)	The Best from Vitas on DVD (3)	2014

=== Singles and EPs ===
Original	English	Year
Опера #2	Opera #2	2001
Good Bye	**	2001
Свет Нового Дня	Light of a New Day	2008
真童话	Fairy Tale	2010
That Song (Remix of 7th Element by Drangabeats)	**	2015
Делю любовь на доли	I Divide Love Into Shares	2015
Roll With The Beat	**	2018
Opera #2 (HD)	**	2018
Back to the Stars	**	2020
За ней	After Her	2020
无词歌	Song Without Words	2020
向着太阳 (with Elvis Wang)	Towards the Sun	2020
"The King" (with Timmy Trumpet)	**	2020
OPERA20	**	2020

=== Videos ===
Original	English	Year
Опера No.2	Opera #2	2000
Опера No.1	Opera #1	2001
Дождь в Тбилиси	Rain in Tbilisi	2001
Блаженный Гуру	Blessed Guru	2001
Улыбнись	Smile	2002
Звезда	Star	2003
Мама	Mama	2003
Птица счастья	The Bird of Happiness	2004
Поцелуй длиною в вечность	Kiss As Long As Eternity	2004
Берега России	Shores of Russia	2005
Lucia Di Lammermoor	Lucia Di Lammermoor	2006
Криком журавлиным	Crane's Crying	2006
Ямайка	Jamaica	2007
La Donna è Mobile	The woman is fickle	2009
Люби меня	Love Me	2009
Раз, два, три	One, Two, Three	2011
Фронтовики	War Veterans	2012
Мне бы в небо (Дуэт с Ксеноной)	I'd Like To Go Up To Sky (feat. Ksenona Ksenia)	2012
Я подарю тебе мир	I'll Give You The World	2013
Делю любовь на доли	I Divide Love Into Shares	2015
Made in China (feat. Sergey Pudovkin)	**	2016
Roll With The Beat (feat. Nappy Roots)	**	2018
Подари мне любовь	Give Me Love	2018
Симфоническая	Symphonic	2018
Делала	Did	2019
Back to the Stars	**	2020

== Concert programs ==
Original	English	Year
Опера No....	Opera #...	2001
Философия чуда или Улыбнись	Philosophy of Miracle or Smile	2002–2003
Песни моей мамы	The Songs of My Mother	2003–2006
Возвращение домой	Return Home	2006–2009
Бессонная ночь	Sleepless Night	2009–2012
Мама и сын	Mommy and Son	2011–2013
Скажи, что ты любишь	Say You Love	2011
15 лет с вами. История моей любви	15 Years With You. My Love Story	2014–2017
Come Just For You!	**	2016
Подари мне любовь	Give Me Love	2018–present
20 Years	**	2019
OPERA20	**	TBA

== Filmography ==
=== Film ===
Year	Title	Role
2002	Сволочь ненаглядная	
2005	Сумасшедший день	
2009	Mulan	Gude
2011	The Founding of a Party	Grigori Voitinsky
2012	A Night to Be a Star	Himself

== Awards and achievements ==
Year	Category	Recording
2001, 2002, 2003	Best selling single Russian Record Prize	"Opera #2"
2001	Komsomolskaya Pravda and Internet Survey "Forum 2001" Musical Discovery of the Year	—
2000, 2001, 2002	Three-time-laureate of the festivals "The Song of the Year" (2000, 2001, 2002)	"Wax Figures"
2001, 2002	Two-time-laureate of the People Prize "Golden Gramophone"	"Opera #2", "Smile!"
2001, 2002, 2003	Three-time-laureate of the Musical Prize "PODIUM" for the most stylish achievements in pop music	—
2001, 2002, 2003	Russian "People's HIT" Prize	"Opera #2", "Smile!", "The Star"
2001, 2003	Radio station "HIT FM" Prize "100 Per Cent HIT"	—
2002	National Musical Prize "Ovation" Soloist of the Year	—
2004	Russian Internet portal AFISHA.COM	—
2007	Order of Service to the Arts	—
2007	Best Album – NewsMusic Poll	"Crane's Crying"
2011	International Song Writers Contest Winner, 3rd place Music Video Category for "Opera #2". Also won second place in People's Choice vote.	"Opera #2"

== See also ==
- Russian pop music
