= Vadim Mulerman =

Soviet singer (1938–2018)

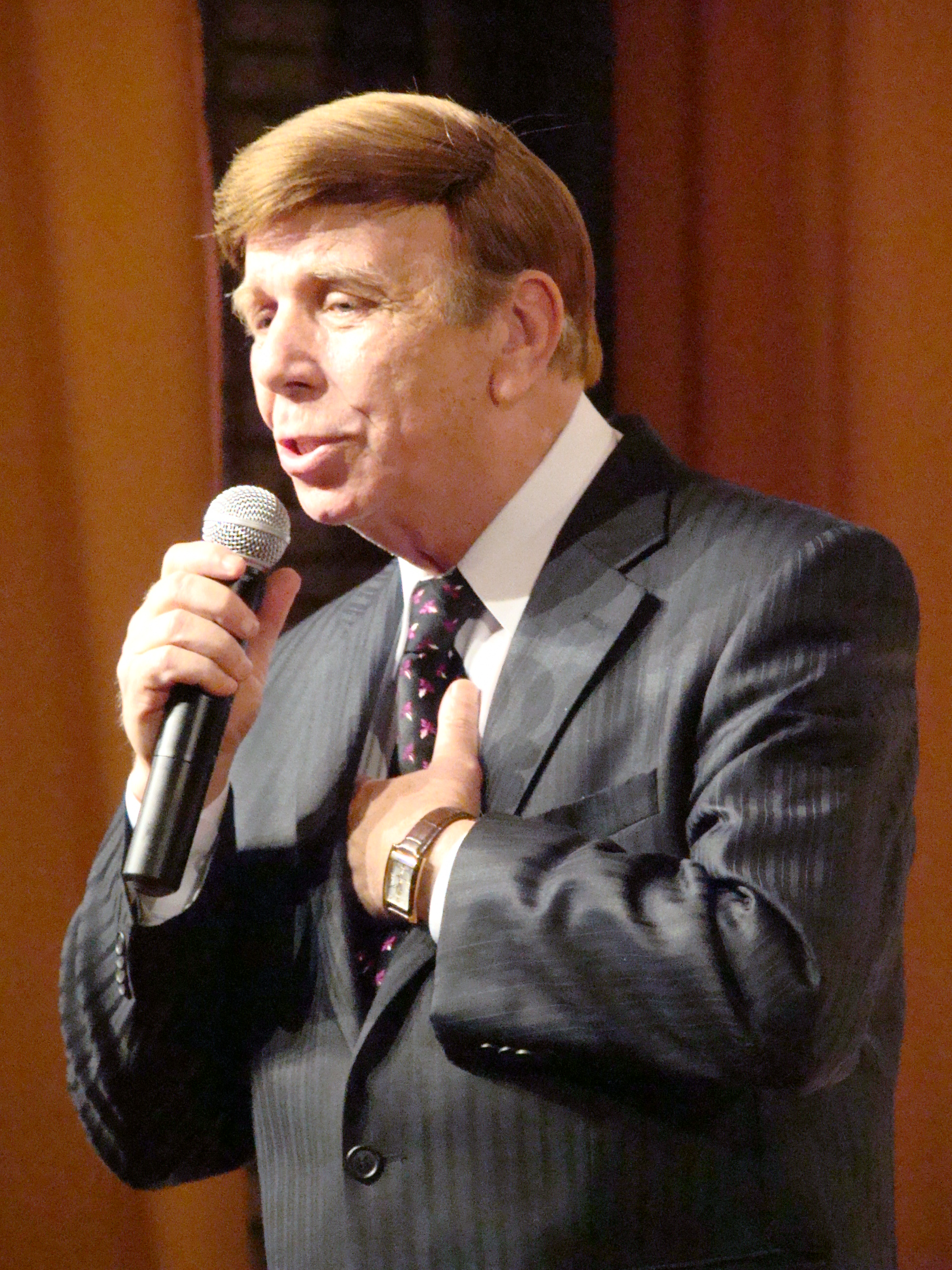
- Vadim Mulerman in 2008

Background information
- Born: August 18, 1938; Kharkiv, Ukrainian SSR, USSR
- Died: May 2, 2018 (aged 79) New York City, New York, U.S.
- Genres: Soviet music, pop
- Occupation: singer
- Instrument: Vocal

Vadim Iosifovich Mulerman (Russian: Вади́м Ио́сифович Мулерма́н; 18 August 1938 – 2 May 2018) was a Soviet, Ukrainian and American singer (baritone).

He was awarded the titles of Honored Artist of the RSFSR (1978) and Merited Artist of Ukraine.

In 1971, by the decision of Sergey Lapin, the then Chairman of the USSR State Committee for Radio and Television (Gosteleradio), Mulerman, along with several other singers of Jewish descent, was de facto barred from appearing on television.

Since 1989, Mulerman lived in the United States, where, in Florida, founded and managed a children's musical theater. As of 2008, he lived in Kharkiv and worked in a youth musical theater. Mulerman died on 2 May 2018 in New York City at the age of 79.

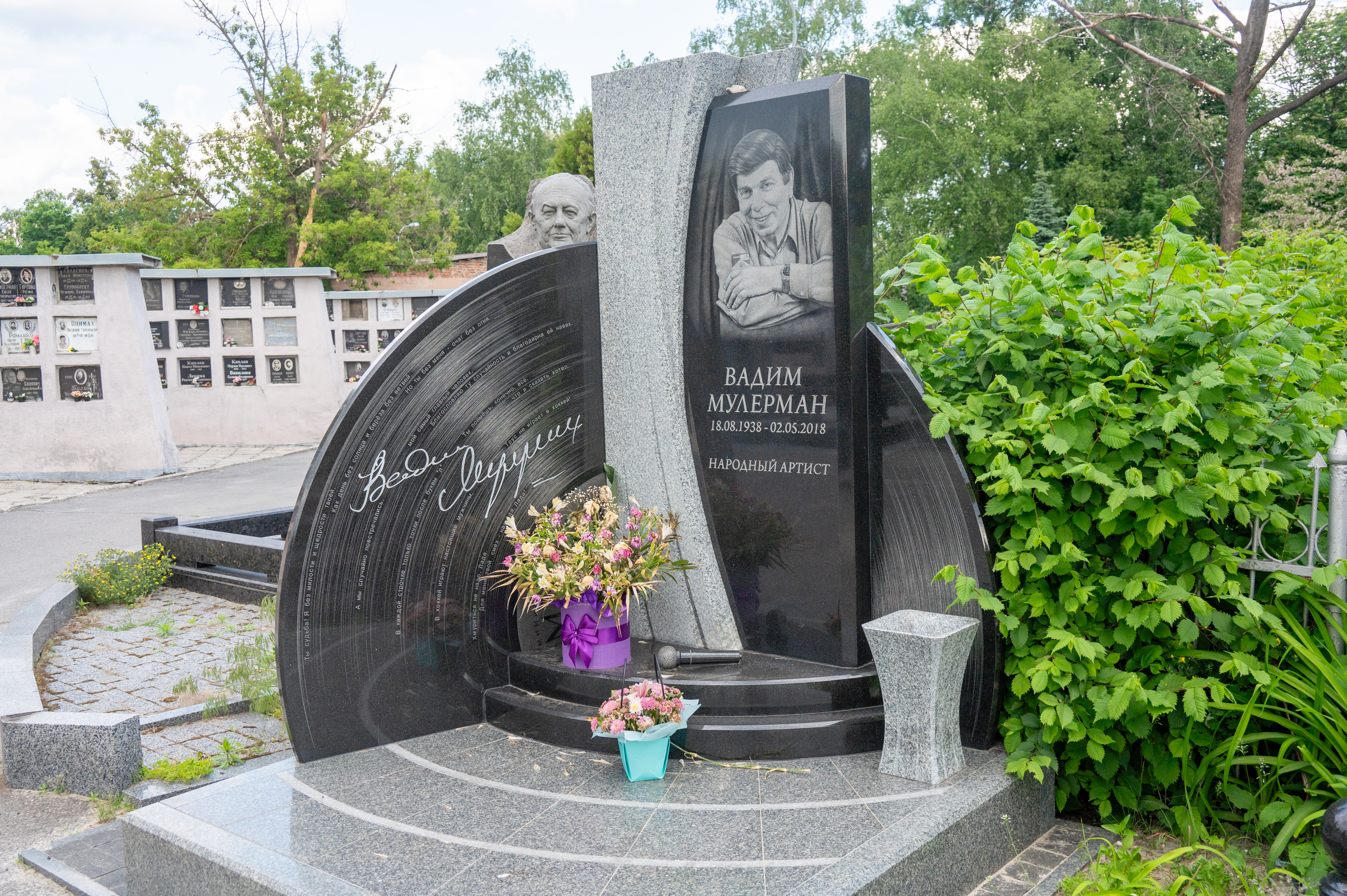
Grave of Vadim Mulerman

== Selected songs ==
- "King the Winner" (Russian: Король-победитель, 1968, based on the poem "Le retour du roi" by Maurice Carême)
- "Lada" (Russian: Лада, 1968)
  • "Lada" (live on Russian television in 2013) on YouTube
- "No Coward Plays Hockey" (1968)
  • Listen on Yandex Music
- "How Nice to Be a General" (Russian: Как хорошо быть генералом)
- "Hutsul Girl" (Russian: Гуцулочка)
- "I Had a Dream" (Russian: Приснилось мне, 1969)
- "August" (Russian: Август)
