= Do You Know What Kind of Guy He Was =

Song by Yuri Gulyayev

from the album Gagarin's Constellation
- Released: 1971
- Length: 3:35
- Label: Melodiya
- Songwriters: Alexandra Pakhmutova (music), Nikolai Dobronravov (lyrics)

Audio sample
- Excerpt from the song, performed by Yuri Gulyayev at Song of the Year in 1971: file; help

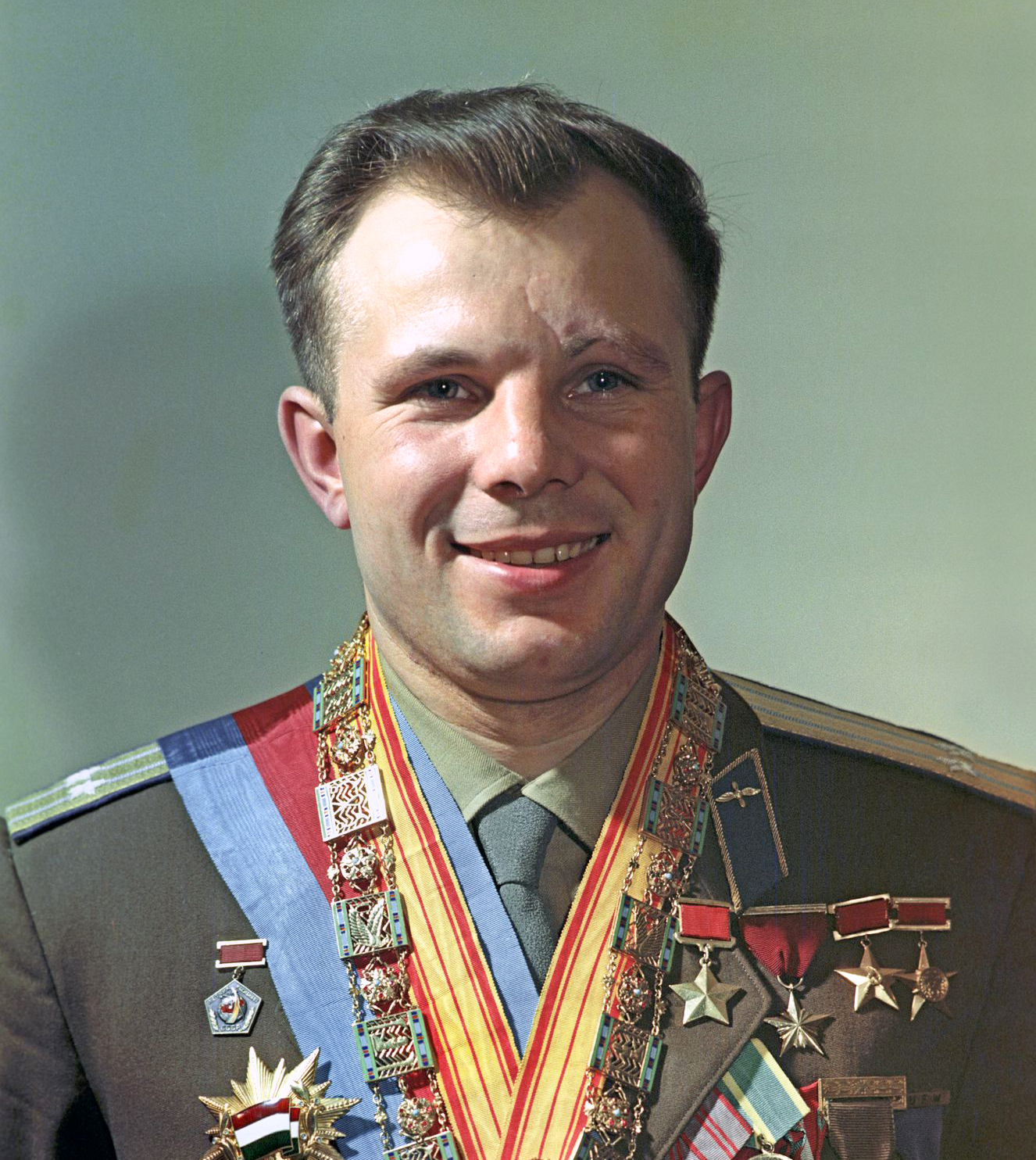
Yuri Gagarin, whose death inspired the song.

"Do You Know What Kind of Guy He Was" (Russian: «Знаете, каким он парнем был», romanized: Znayete, kakim on parnem byl) is a 1971 Soviet song composed by Alexandra Pakhmutova with lyrics by Nikolai Dobronravov. It was issued by Melodiya and is part of the vocal cycle Gagarin's Constellation («Созвездие Гагарина»), a set of songs about cosmonaut Yuri Gagarin.

The song is framed as a lyrical portrait of Gagarin and his public image instead of a biographical narrative as the song suggests. The lyrics portray Gagarin as both a heroic and ordinary figure by combining cosmic imagery with everyday Soviet life, while connecting his spaceflight to the Russian folk song Vdol po Piterskoy. Melodiya’s catalogue credits Gulyayev as the vocal cycle’s performer, with instrumentals from the Tchaikovsky Symphony Orchestra conducted by Yuri Silantyev.

== Background and composition ==
Gagarin’s Constellation was presented as Pakhmutova and Dobronravov’s musical tribute to Gagarin. According to Russian music writer Sergey Kuriy, Dobronravov recalled that the song’s opening phrase emerged naturally while he and Pakhmutova were discussing how to capture what people knew about Gagarin’s character. Kuriy also noted that the lyrics incorporates Gagarin’s widely quoted exclamation "Поехали!" ("Let's go!") as a central motif.

== Release ==
The song was released by Melodiya in 1971 within Gagarin’s Constellation and is listed in Melodiya’s official catalogue with composer and lyricist credits, to Pakhmutova and Dobronravov respectively, and a run time of 3:35. The song is included in the Soviet-era anthology Russkiye sovetskiye pesni: 1917–1977 (Russian Soviet Songs: 1917–1977), edited by N. Kryukov.

== Performances and legacy ==
Melodiya’s catalogue identifies Yuri Gulyayev as the cycle’s performer. A televised performance of the song appears in the program listing for Pesnya-71 (Песня-71). Gulyayev’s recording has also been reissued on later compilations, including the 2009 CD collection Through Thorns to the Stars: Songs About Space («Через тернии к звёздам. Песни о космосе»).

In addition to Gulyayev’s performances, baritone Leonid Smetannikov performed the song in 1975 in a televised concert performance. The song has remained in the repertoire of major Russian ensembles and was performed by the Alexandrov Ensemble in April 2024, with soloist Maksim Maklakov.

== See also ==
- Yuri Gagarin
