= Smile! (Vitas album) =

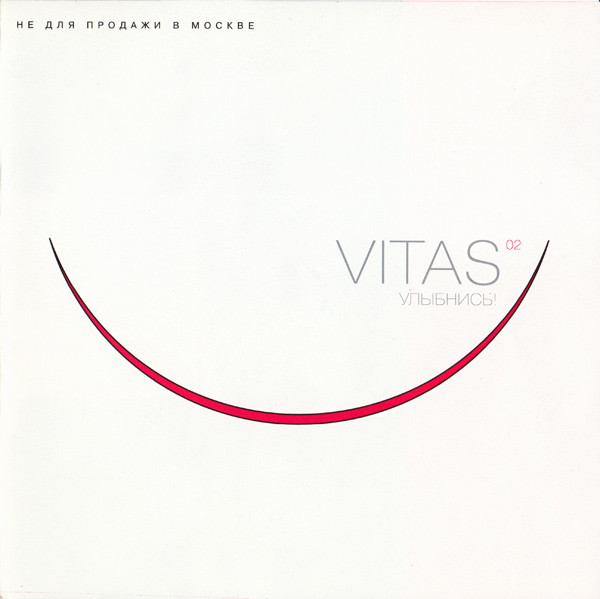

Studio album by Vitas
- Released: March 11, 2002
- Recorded: 2001–02
- Label: Iceberg; Moon

Vitas chronology
Philosophy of Miracle (2001)	Smile! (2002)	Mama (2003)

Smile! (Улыбнись!, Ulybnis!) is a Russian album by Vitas (Витас), released on 11 March 2002. Several songs from this album featured in his Philosophy of Miracle concert programme, whose performance at the Kremlin earned Vitas a record as the youngest artist to perform a solo concert at the State Kremlin Palace; a DVD of this concert was later released.

== Release ==
The title track won the Russian Golden Gramophone and People's Hit awards. "Good-bye" was released as a single, which included 5 different mixes of the song, the tracks "Ave Maria" and "Byelorussia", and the music video for "Opera #1" from his previous album Philosophy of Miracle. "Good-bye" is notable for Vitas' extreme bass vocals, in contrast to his more usual high-pitched vocals. "Blessed Guru" (sometimes translated "Blissful Guru") also exercises his seldom-used bass range. The song titles "Good-bye" and "Do Svidaniya" (Russian: "До свидания", usually listed in English as "See You Later", as in the track listing here) can cause some confusion because the latter is often translated as "Goodbye".

It also includes Vitas' rendition of "Ave Maria" by Franz Schubert with a contrasting hellish operatic ending; a shortened version without this ending was included in Vitas' 2010 compilation album Masterpieces of Three Centuries.

== Track listing ==
Track number	Russian title	English title	Music	Lyrics
01	Улыбнись	Smile!	Vitas	D. Plachkovsky
02	Блаженный Гуру	Blessed Guru	Vitas	Vitas
03	Восковые фигуры	Wax Figures	Vitas	D. Plachkovsky, Vitas, S. Pudovkin
04	Плачет чужая тоска	Someone's Melancholy Is Crying	Vitas	D. Plachovsky
05	Аве Мария	Ave Maria	Franz Schubert	Traditional prayer
06	Холодный мир	The Cold World	V. Molchanov	D. Plachkovsky
07	Остров затонувших кораблей	The Island of Sunken Ships	O. Gazmanov	E. Nebylova
08	Фантастические сны	Fantastic Dreams	Vitas	Vitas, D. Plachkovsky
09	Good-bye	Good-bye	Vitas	Vitas
10	Счастье	Happiness	Vitas	Vitas
11	Отцвели хризантемы	Chrysanthemums Have Faded Out	N. Harito	V. Shumsky
12	Дождь в Тбилиси	Rain in Tbilisi	Vitas	Ratner
13	Слепой художник	Blind Painter	Vitas	D. Plachkovsky, Vitas, S. Pudovkin
14	Милая музыка	Lovely Music	Vitas	Vitas
15	Белоруссия	Byelorussia	Alexandra Pakhmutova	N. Dobronravov
16	До свидания	See You Later (Do Svidaniya)	Vitas	Vitas
