= No Coward Plays Hockey =

"No Coward Plays Hockey" (Russian: Трус не игра́ет в хокке́й) could be called the anthem of ice hockey in the Soviet Union and Russia. The song was composed in 1968 by Aleksandra Pakhmutova (music), Sergei Grebennikov and Nikolai Dobronravov (lyrics - both). During this period of Soviet history, ice hockey was very popular in the Soviet Union, which is why it was not a big surprise when such a song appeared. Since then, it has been performed by many musicians - and some hockey arenas in Russia use its theme to open the game.

The original version of this song was performed in 1968 by Vadim Mulerman.

The Canadian distribution rights to the song were owned by Aggie Kukulowicz, who acted as Team Canada's translator during the Summit Series.
