= Maya Kristalinskaya =

Soviet-Russian singer

- Born: Maya Vladimirovna Kristalinskaya; 24 February 1932; Moscow, Soviet Union
- Died: 19 June 1985 (aged 53); Moscow, Soviet Union
- Education: Moscow Aviation Institute
- Occupations: Singer, translator
- Awards: Honored Artist of the RSFSR (1974)
- Musical career
- Genres: Pop, jazz

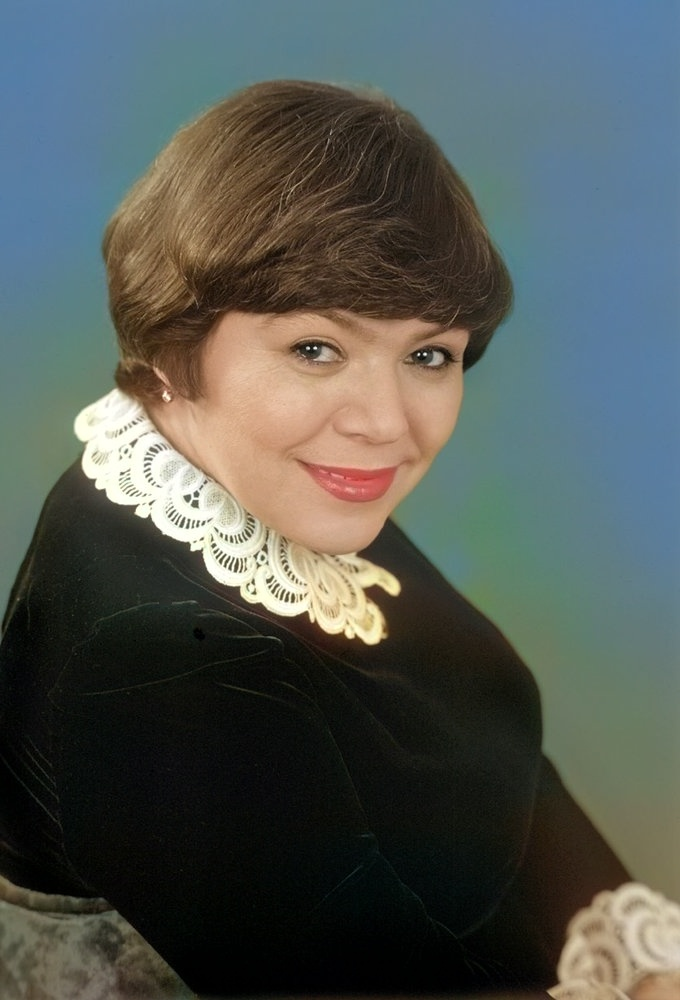
Maya Kristalinskaya (1979)

Maya Vladimirovna Kristalinskaya (Russian: Ма́йя Влади́мировна Кристали́нская; 24 February 1932, Moscow – 19 June 1985, Moscow) was a Soviet singer.

In 1957 she performed at the 6th World Festival of Youth and Students in Moscow with an amateur ensemble under the direction of Yury Saulsky and was awarded a Laureate prize. Later she started performing independently. Wide popularity came to her starting in the early 1960s when she recorded the song "Dva Berega" ("We are Two Banks of the Same River") from the 1959 movie Thirst. The vinyl recording of the song sold 7 million copies. Maya Kristalinskaya toured the country a lot, worked with the jazz orchestras of Eddie Rosner and Oleg Lundstrom, with the ensemble of Evgeny Rokhlin. In 1963, she performed "Ya Tebya Podozhdu" on popular show "Little Blue Light". Kristalinskaya was the original performer of the song "Nezhnost'" (1966) which is considered the epitome of her singing talent. In 1966, Maya Kristalinskaya was recognized as the best pop singer of the year.

In 1972 and 1975, Kristalinskaya participated in the "Pesnya goda" festival.

She was bestowed the title of Honored Artist of the RSFSR in 1974.

In her latter years, Maya Kristalinskaya worked on the translation of Marlene Dietrich's book "Reflections". The book was published in the USSR after her death.

In 1984, after the death of Kristalinskaya's second husband, Eduard Barclay (he died on June 15, 1984, from a stroke caused by complications of diabetes), the singer's illness worsened. On June 19, 1985, at the age of 53, Maya Kristalinskaya died. She lay in state at the Central House of Artists (Russian: Центральный дом работников искусств)

During her life she lived in 11/13 Myaskovsky Street and on 1 Novoalekseevskaya street in Moscow. In 2002, Kristalinskaya got a star posthumously on the Star Square in Moscow.

Nikolai Ovchinnikov (Afisha) in the article "10 best and most amazing albums with Soviet songs" described Kristalinskaya's debut LP as "an ideal portrait of the main singer of the sixties", who was equally subject to waltz, jazz, and movie buffs.

== Selected songs ==
- And it's Snowing
- Dva Berega
- Ne Speshi
- Nezhnost'
- The Volga River Flows
- What is a Song Without an Accordion
- Ya Tebya Podozhdu
- Zemlyanka

== Partial discography ==
- 1965 — Poyot Maya Kristalinskaya (LP, «Melodiya» Д 15815–15816)
- 1969 — Maya Kristalinskaya (LP, «Melodiya» С 01727 — 8, Export edition)
- 2007 — Tol'ko lyubov' prava (2CD, «Bomba Music» BoMB 033-337/338)
