= A Kiss as Long as Eternity =

Studio album by Vitas
- Released: 2004

Vitas chronology
The Songs of My Mother (Pesni moei mamy) (2003)	A Kiss as Long as Eternity (2004)	Return Home (2006)

A Kiss as Long as Eternity (Поцелуй длиною в вечность) is a Russian album by Vitas (Витас), released in 2004. The album sold over two million copies within the first six months of its release. Vitas wrote the songs "Mantra", "I Believe in Love" and "Internet Mood" himself, and "A Kiss as Long as Eternity", "Half Night, Half Day", "Heartbeat", "In Shorts and a T-shirt" and "Streets of the Capital" in collaboration with other songwriters. Unusually for Vitas' own compositions, he makes little use of high-pitched vocals on this album: one reviewer remarked "It was... delightful to find his baritone and bass richer and smoother than before."

== Track listing ==
Track number	Russian title	English title	Music	Lyrics
01	Поцелуй длиною в вечность	A Kiss as Long as Eternity	Vitas	Vitas, M. Maltsev
02	Куда ты - туда я	Where's You, There's Me	Lyubasha	Lyubasha
03	Не молчи так громко	Don't Keep Silence So Loudly	Lyubasha	Lyubasha
04	Невезучий	Unlucky	Lyubasha	Lyubasha
05	Ночь пополам, день пополам	Half Night, Half Day	Vitas	M. Maltsev
06	Сердцебиение	Heartbeat	Vitas	Vitas, M. Maltsev
07	В шортиках и в маечке	In Shorts and a T-Shirt	Vitas, M. Shevchenko	M. Shevchenko
08	Мантра	Mantra	Vitas	Vitas
09	Улицы столицы	Streets of the Capital	Vitas	E. Nebylova
10	Верю в любовь	I Believe in Love	Vitas	Vitas
11	Интернет-настроение	Internet Mood	Vitas	Vitas
