= Philosophy of Miracle =

2001 album by Russian singer Vitas

Studio album by Vitas
- Released: May 10, 2001
- Recorded: 1998–2001
- Genres: Operatic pop; synth-pop; Eurodance
- Length: 57:52
- Label: Iceberg
- Producer: Eduard Izmestyev

Vitas chronology
Philosophy of Miracle (2001)	Smile! (2002)

Philosophy of Miracle (Russian: Филосо́фия чу́да, romanized: Filosofiya chuda, IPA: [fʲɪlɐˈsofʲɪjə ˈt͡ɕudə]) is the debut album by Russian-Ukrainian singer Vitas, released on 10 May 2001. It is sometimes translated as Philosophy of a Miracle, Philosophy of Wonder, or Wonders of Philosophy. All the songs were written or co-written by Vitas, with the exception of "Prelude" by Dmitri Plachkovsky. The album was recorded with many backing musicians including the Vienna Symphony Orchestra.

== Release ==
Neon (Russian: Неон, IPA: [nʲɪˈon]) magazine described the album as "fresh, original, new and therefore interesting". The album received widespread popularity in mid-2015 after "The 7th Element" (often memed as "Chum Drum Bedrum" and "Weird Russian Singer") and "Opera No. 2" gained popularity several years earlier. It has reportedly sold at least 3.5 million copies in China alone.

Several songs from this album featured in Vitas' Opera #... and Smile or Philosophy of Miracle concert programmes, the premiere of the latter earned him a record as the youngest artist to perform a solo concert at the State Kremlin Palace. A DVD of this concert was later released. One song from the album, "Opera #2", was released as a single and became hugely popular, earning the Russian Record best-selling single prize in three consecutive years, a Golden Gramophone award, and a People's Hit prize. According to an estimate from Gemini Sun records, "Opera #2" has been downloaded over 20 million times, with over 15 million downloads for the track "The 7th Element". The music video for "Opera #2" and the TV performance of "The 7th Element" have been forwarded frequently via the internet, accounting for much of Vitas' worldwide recognition.

The 12th track on the album is an early recording of "Opera #1", which comes from the studio sessions during Vitas' early career in his native town Odessa. A video for the track was filmed between 1998 and 1999, featuring a 19-year-old long-haired Vitas on a beach and at a night club. The video was leaked by fans in May 2021.

== Track listing ==
#	Russian title	English title	Music	Lyrics
1	"Мечты"	"Dreams"	Vitas	Vitas
2	"7 элемент"	"The 7th Element"	Vitas	Vitas
3	"Опера #2"	"Opera #2"	Vitas	Vitas; V. Borovsky
4	"Прелюдия"	"Prelude"	D. Plachkovsky	Plachkovsky
5	"Карлсон"	"Karlsson"	Vitas	Plachkovsky
6	"Опера #1 (Asian Version)"	"Opera #1 (Asian Version)"	Vitas	Vitas; V. Borovsky
7	"День рождения моей смерти"	"The Birthday of My Death"	Vitas	Plachkovsky
8	"Душа"	"Soul"	Vitas	Borovsky
9	"Тело"	"Body"	Vitas	Vitas
10	"Старый граммофон"	"An Old Gramophone"	Vitas	Vitas
11	"Цирк"	"Circus"	Vitas	Plachkovsky
12	"Опера #1 (Euro Version)"	"Opera #1 (Euro Version)"	Vitas	Vitas; Borovsky
13	"День рождения моей смерти (That Black Ragamix)"	"The Birthday of My Death (That Black Ragamix)"	Vitas	Plachkovsky
