= Gagarin's Constellation =

1971 EP by Yuri Gulyayev

EP by Yuri Gulyayev
- Released: 1971
- Recorded: 1968–1971
- Language: Russian
- Label: Melodiya

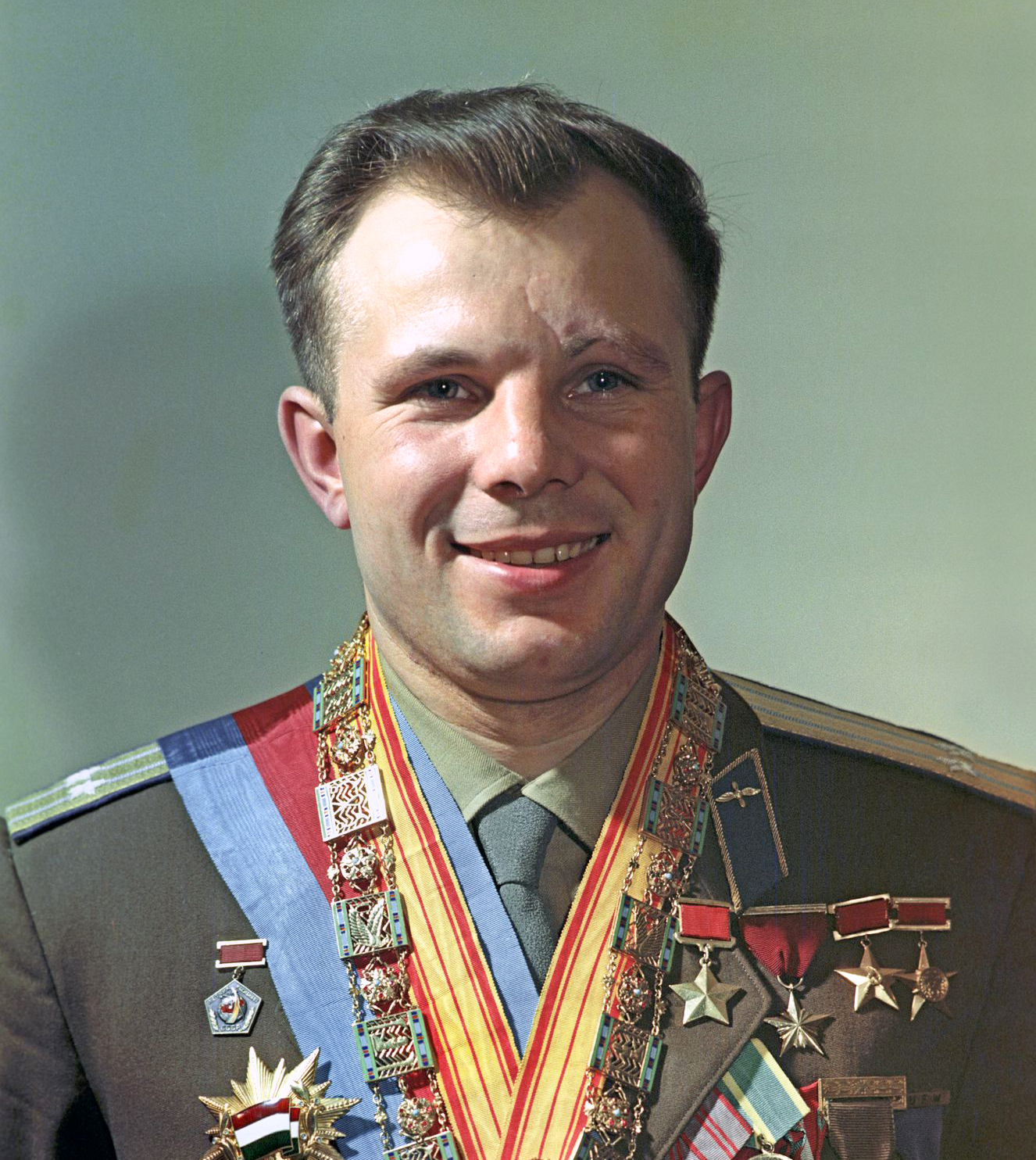
Yuri Gagarin, whose death inspired the song cycle.

Gagarin's Constellation (Russian: Созвездие Гагарина, Sozvezdie Gagarina) is a Soviet vocal song cycle by composer Alexandra Pakhmutova and lyricist Nikolai Dobronravov, first issued as an EP by the state label Melodiya in 1971, performed by Soviet tenor Yuri Gulyayev.

The cycle was conceived as a lyrical tribute to Yuri Gagarin, whom Pakhmutova and Dobronravov knew personally, and was written in the years following his death in 1968. Its best-known song is Do You Know What Kind of Guy He Was.

The original 1971 release contained four songs and was included in Melodiya’s official catalog of recordings. A later concert variant expanded the cycle to five numbers by adding the title song "Созвездье Гагарина". The song Do You Know What Kind of Guy He Was quickly became associated with both Gagarin's Constellation and Gulyayev, and has been widely covered in subsequent decades.

== Track listing ==
=== 1971 EP (Melodiya) ===
1. "Смоленская дорога" (Smolenskaya doroga, "The Smolensk Road")
2. "Знаете, каким он парнем был" (Znaete, kakim on parnem byl, "Do You Know What Kind of Guy He Was")
3. "Как нас Юра в полёт провожал" (Kak nas Yura v polyot provozhal, "How Yura Saw Us Off to Flight")
4. "Запевала звёздных дорог" (Zapevala zvyozdnykh dorog, "Song-leader of the Star Roads")

=== Concert variant (1973) ===
1. "Запевала звёздных дорог"
2. "Смоленская дорога"
3. "Знаете, каким он парнем был"
4. "Как нас Юра в полёт провожал"
5. "Созвездье Гагарина" (Sozvezd'ye Gagarina, "Gagarin's Constellation")

== Personnel ==
- Yuri Gulyayev – vocals
- Alexandra Pakhmutova – music
- Nikolai Dobronravov – lyrics
