= And the Battle Is Going Again =

Soviet patriotic song

"And the Battle's Going Again"

Song
- Language: Russian
- Written: 1974
- Composer: Aleksandra Pakhmutova
- Lyricist: Nikolai Dobronravov

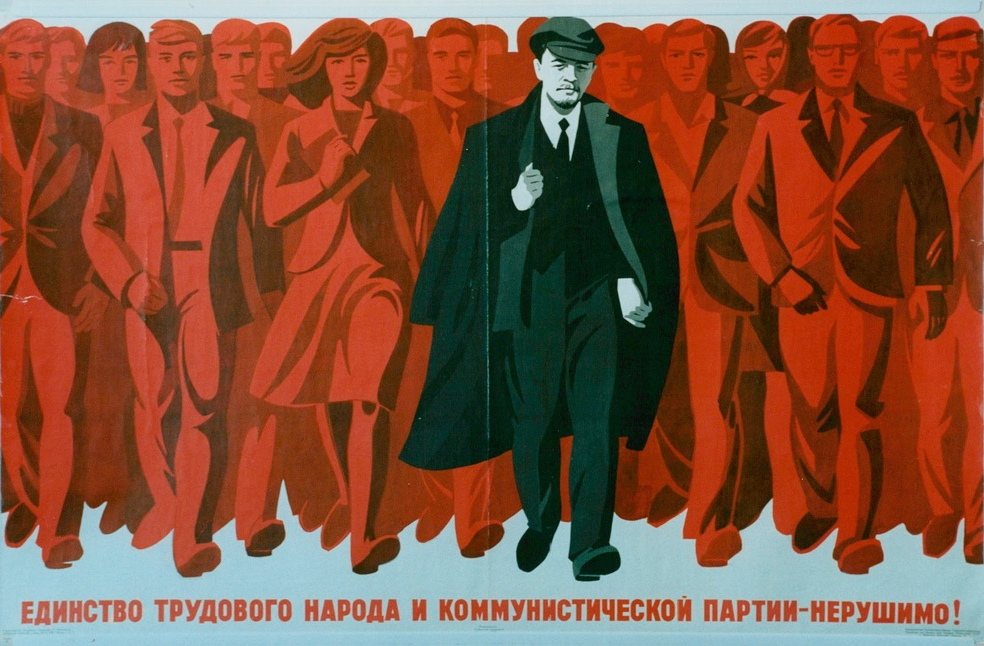
Lenin on a 1968 Soviet propaganda poster. Translating to "The unity of the working people and the Communist Party is inviolable!"

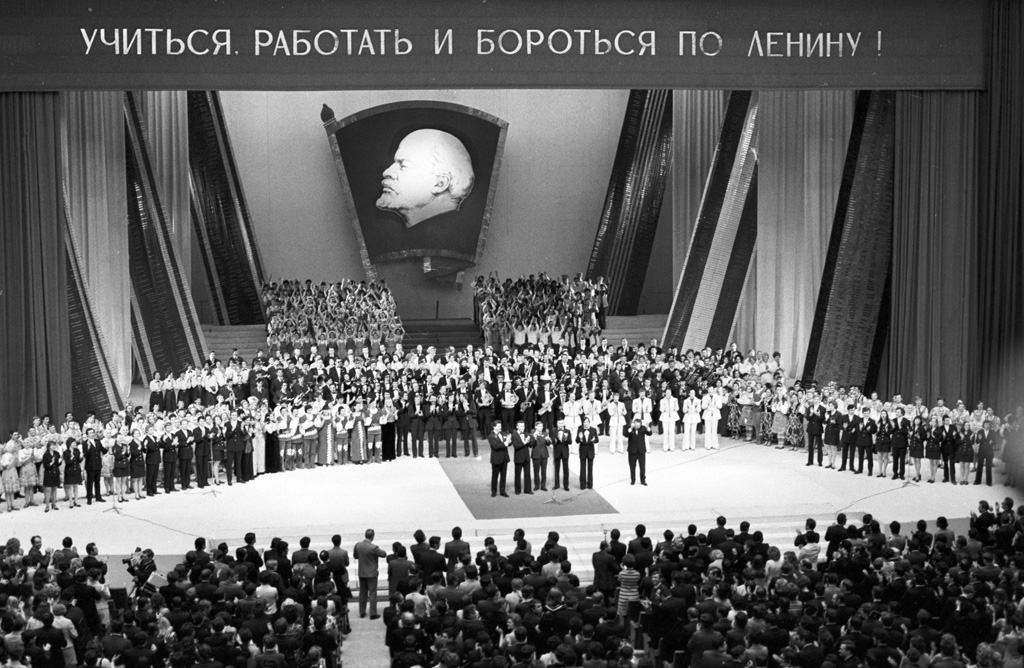
The closing of the 17th congress of the Komsomol

"And the Battle's Going Again", (Note: Russian: И вновь продолжается бой, romanized: I vnov prodolzháyetsya boy, IPA: [i‿vnofʲ prədɐlˈʐajɪtsə boj]) also known as "And Lenin Is Young Once Again", (Note: Russian: И Ленин такой молодой, romanized: I Lénin takóy molodóy, IPA: [i‿ˈlʲenʲɪn tɐˈkoj məlɐˈdoj]) is a Soviet patriotic song released in 1974 about the October Revolution and Vladimir Lenin. It was composed by Aleksandra Pakhmutova to lyrics written by her husband Nikolai Dobronravov, with the most known performance of the song being done by Soviet singers Leonid Smetannikov, Joseph Kobzon, and Lev Leshchenko. The song was also performed by Lev Leshchenko at the finals of Pesnya goda in 1975.

The Soviet-Russian group Grazhdanskaya Oborona has performed the song since 1994, when band leader Yegor Letov was associated with the National Bolshevik Party.

== Lyrics ==
Russian original

Неба утреннего стяг,
В жизни важен первый шаг.
Слышишь: реют над страною,
Ветры яростных атак.

Припев:
И вновь продолжается бой,
И сердцу тревожно в груди.
𝄆 И Ленин такой молодой,
И юный – Октябрь впереди. 𝄇

Весть летит во все концы:
Вы поверьте нам, отцы, –
Будут новые победы,
Встанут новые бойцы.

Припев

С неба милостей не жди,
Жизнь для правды не щади.
Нам, ребята, в этой жизни,
Только с правдой по пути.

Припев

В мире — зной и снегопад,
Мир и беден и богат.
С нами юность всей планеты —
Наш всемирный стройотряд!

Припев

Romanization of Russian (Croatian-styled)

Neba utrennego stjag,
V žizni važen pervyj šag.
Slyšišj: rejut nad stranoju,
Vetry jarostnyh atak.

Pripev:
I vnovj prodolžajetsja boj,
I serdcu trevožno v grudi.
𝄆 I Lenin takoj molodoj,
I junyj – Oktjabrj vperedi. 𝄇

Vestj letit vo vse koncy:
Vy poverjte nam, otcy, –
Budut novyje pobedy,
Vstanut novyje bojcy.

Pripev

S neba milostej ne ždi,
Žiznj dlja pravdy ne ščadi.
Nam, rebjata, v etoj žizni,
Toljko s pravdoj po puti.

Pripev

V mire – znoj i snegopad,
Mir i beden i bogat.
S nami junostj vsej planety –
Naš vsemirnyj strojotrjad!

Pripev

English translation

The flag of the morning sky,
Important is the first step in life.
Do you hear soaring above the country
The winds of ferocious attacks?

Chorus:
And the battle's going again,
And the heart's uneasy in the chest.
𝄆 And Lenin is so young,
And the young October is ahead. 𝄇

The news is flying to all the world's ends:
Believe us, fathers, –
There will be new victories,
New warriors will rise.

Chorus

Wait not for mercies from the sky,
Spare not your life for truth.
In this life, comrades,
We stick only to the truth.

Chorus

There's heat and snowfall in the world,
The world is both poor and rich.
The youth of the whole planet's with us –
Our global construction brigade!

Chorus
