= 1889 Pakhmutova =

Carbonaceous main-belt asteroid

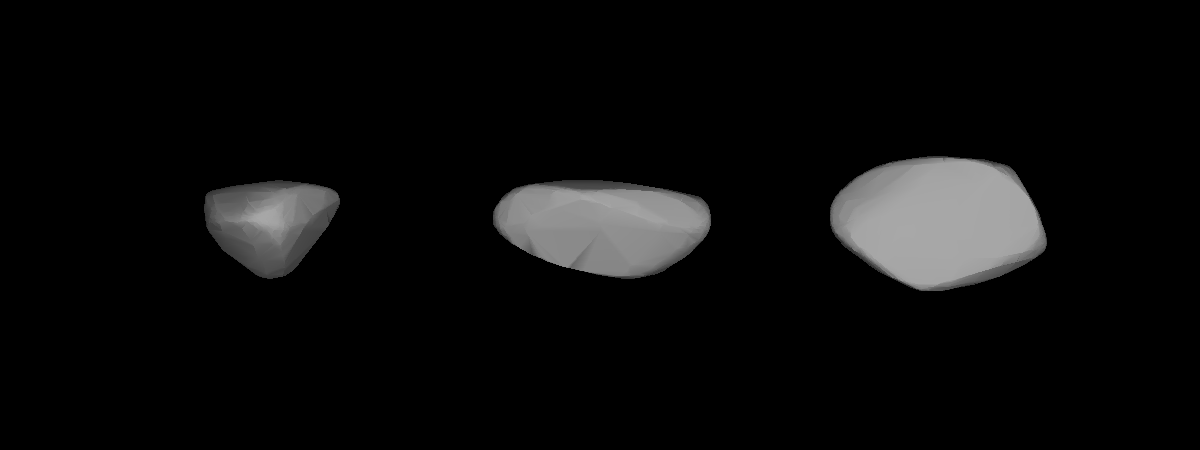
- Lightcurve-based 3D-model of Pakhmutova

Discovery
- Discovered by: L. Chernykh
- Discovery site: Crimean Astrophysical Obs.
- Discovery date: 24 January 1968

Designations
- Named after: Aleksandra Pakhmutova (Russian composer)
- Alternative designations: 1968 BE · 1942 JM; 1966 US · 1969 JM
- Minor planet category: main-belt · (outer)

Orbital characteristics
- Epoch 4 September 2017 (JD 2458000.5)
- Uncertainty parameter 0
- Observation arc: 50.53 yr (18,455 days)
- Aphelion: 3.4349 AU
- Perihelion: 2.7452 AU
- Semi-major axis: 3.0901 AU
- Eccentricity: 0.1116
- Orbital period (sidereal): 5.43 yr (1,984 days)
- Mean anomaly: 33.156°
- Mean motion: 0° 10^{m} 53.04^{s} / day
- Inclination: 13.183°
- Longitude of ascending node: 55.153°
- Argument of perihelion: 84.606°

Physical characteristics
- Dimensions: 33.41 km (derived); 33.53±1.8 km 35.24±0.63 km 35.45±10.87 km 37.47±0.84 km 37.68±14.19 km
- Synodic rotation period: 17.490±0.004 h (Note: Lightcurve plot of 1889 Pakhmutova with a rotation period 17.490±0.004 hours with a brightness amplitude of 0.50±0.02 by B. D. Warner at the Palmer Divide Observatory (2006). Summary figures at LCDB); 17.5157±0.0005 h 17.5226±0.0113 h
- Geometric albedo: 0.05±0.04; 0.057±0.013; 0.0574 (derived); 0.06±0.09; 0.061±0.003; 0.0752±0.009
- Spectral type: C
- Absolute magnitude (H): 10.80 · 10.969±0.002 (R) · 11.0 · 11.1 · 11.12 · 11.29±0.37

1889 Pakhmutova, provisional designation 1968 BE, is a carbonaceous asteroid from the outer region of the asteroid belt, approximately 35 kilometers in diameter.

It was discovered by Russian astronomer Lyudmila Chernykh at the Crimean Astrophysical Observatory in Nauchnyj on 24 January 1968. The asteroid was named after Russian composer Aleksandra Pakhmutova.

== Orbit and classification ==
Pakhmutova orbits the Sun in the outer main-belt at a distance of 2.7–3.4 AU once every 5 years and 5 months (1,984 days). Its orbit has an eccentricity of 0.11 and an inclination of 13° with respect to the ecliptic. It was first identified as 1942 JM at Johannesburg Observatory in 1942. Its first used observation was made in 1968, when it was identified as 1966 US at the discovering observatory, extending the body's observation arc by 2 years prior to its official discovery observation.

== Physical characteristics ==
Pakhmutova has been characterized as a carbonaceous C-type asteroid.

=== Diameter and albedo ===
This asteroid has a mean-diameter between 33.53 and 37.68 kilometers, and an albedo between 0.05 and 0.0752, as measured by the space-based Akari, IRAS and WISE/NEOWISE surveys. The Collaborative Asteroid Lightcurve Link derives an albedo of 0.0574 and a diameter of 33.41 kilometers with an absolute magnitude of 11.1.

=== Rotation period and poles ===
In February 2006, a rotational lightcurve was obtained by American astronomer Brian Warner at his Palmer Divide Observatory (716) in Colorado. Lightcurve analysis gave a rotation period of 17.490 hours with a brightness variation of 0.50 in magnitude (U=3-). Photometric observations at the Palomar Transient Factory in February 2012, gave a period of 17.5226 hours and an amplitude of 0.49 magnitude (U=2).

In 2011, a modeled lightcurve using data from the Uppsala Asteroid Photometric Catalogue (UAPC) and other sources gave a period 17.5157 hours, as well as a spin axis of (22.0°, –76.0°; 167.0°, –40.0°) in ecliptic coordinates (λ, β) (U=2).

== Naming ==
This minor planet was named in honor of the Russian composer Aleksandra Pakhmutova, one of the best known figures in Soviet and later Russian popular music. The official naming citation was published by the Minor Planet Center on 20 February 1976 (M.P.C. 3936).
