= Mezh vysokikh khlebov zateryalosya =

"Меж высоких хлебов затерялося"

Song
- Language: Russian
- English title: "Amid the Tall Grain Lost from Sight"
- Published: 1861 (poem)
- Genre: Folk
- Composer: Nikolay Alexandrov (1911)
- Lyricist: Nikolay Nekrasov

"Mezh vysokikh khlebov zateryalosya" (Russian: Меж высоких хлебов затерялося, lit. "Amid the Tall Grain Lost from Sight") is a Russian song based on a poem by Nikolay Nekrasov. In spite of its origin, the song is often regarded as a folk one, mainly due its incredible popularity.

== Synopsys ==
The song focuses on the rural funeral of a young man, a city-dweller who shot himself dead.

The narrator, probably a peasant, begins his story with the mention of his own village. Later he describes the sequence of events: the death, police, the funeral… The village and the city are two different worlds. The peasants associate police, trials, money, and power with the opposite, "hostile space" of the city. However, they forgive the deceased.

== Commentary ==
=== Historical background ===
Nekrasov wrote his poem Pokhorony (Russian: Похороны, lit. The Funeral) between 22 and 25 June 1861, in Greshnevo. It was first published in Sovremennik, 1861.

In 1911, Nikolay Alexandrov set the poem to music.

=== Performance ===
The song was popularized by some well-known Russian and Soviet singers, e.g. by Vadim Kozin, by Ivan Skobtsov and, in particular, by Lidia Ruslanova.
