= O Sport, You Are Peace! =

- Russian poster
- Directed by: Yuri Ozerov
- Written by: Yuri Ozerov; Boris Rychkov
- Cinematography: Nikolay Olonovskiy; Lev Maksimov; Mikhail Oshurkov; Fyodor Khitruk (animation)
- Music by: Aleksandra Pakhmutova; Sándor Kallós
- Production companies: Mosfilm Studios; Sovexportfilm
- Release date: 1981
- Running time: 142 minutes
- Country: Soviet Union
- Languages: Russian; English; German; Spanish

O Sport, You Are Peace! (Russian: О спорт, ты - мир! transliterated as O sport, ty - mir!) is a 1981 documentary film directed by Yuri Ozerov, who also co-wrote it. The documentary shows the opening and closing ceremonies, and sporting events of the 1980 Summer Olympics held in Moscow.

The director was awarded the State Prize of the USSR in 1982. The film was selected as the Soviet entry for the Best Foreign Language Film at the 54th Academy Awards, but did not reach the finals.

== See also ==
- List of submissions to the 54th Academy Awards for Best Foreign Language Film
- List of Soviet submissions for the Academy Award for Best Foreign Language Film
