= Blagodat' I-IV =

Blagodat' I

Compilation album by Kommunizm
- Released: 1996 (Cassette), 2000 (CD)
- Language: Russian
- Label: Hor

Blagodat' (Russian: Благодать, lit. 'Grace') was a compilation of songs from the Russian bands Kommunizm, Tsiganyata i Ya s Ilyicha and unreleased songs from Yegor i Opizdenevshiye (compilation released under the name of Kommunizm). Divided into 4 different Cassettes. It was a final compilation before Kommunizm's break-up. The CD version was released in 2000 under the Hor label. In 2015, the Wyrgorod label released a CD uniting 4 different into two different CDs.

== Blagodat' I (1996, 2000) ==
=== Track listing (1996 and 2000) ===
No.	Title	Music	Length
1.	"Благодать (Grace)"	Kommunizm	0:14
2.	"На Блаженном Острове Коммунизма (On the Blessed Island of Communism)"	Tsiganyata i Ya s Ilyicha	4:33
3.	"Небо Цвета Мяса (Meat-Colored Sky)"	Kommunizm	4:50
4.	"А Дальше Чтo? (Then what next?)"	Kommunizm	2:15
5.	"С Понедельника На Пятницу Я Расчитывали Быть, А Со Вторника Суббота Подошла К Концу Опять (From Monday to Friday I was counting on being, but from Tuesday Saturday came to an end again)"	Yegor i Opizdenevshiye	3:51
6.	"Ворошилов (Voroshilov)"	Kommunizm	2:09
7.	"Песня Гвоздя (Song of the Nail)"	Kommunizm	5:04
8.	"Я Весь Пру (Im all high)"	Kommunizm	1:32
9.	"Концептуализм Внутри (Conceptualism Inside)"	Kommunizm	3:30
10.	"Один И Тот Же Сон (One and the Same Dream)"	Kommunizm	3:07
11.	"Соло-Соло-Со-Во-Во-Во-Во Хо-Хо-Хо-Ло-Ло (Solo-Solo-So-Vo-Vo-Vo-Vo Ho-Ho-Ho-Lo-Lo)"	Kommunizm	0:40
12.	"Ничего Не Вижу (I don't see anything)"	Kommunizm	2:59
13.	"Созвездие Яйца (The constellation of the Egg)"	Grazhdanskaya Oborona	5:18

== Blagodat' II (1996, 2000) ==
Blagodat' II

Compilation album by Kommunizm
- Released: 1996 (cassette), 2000 (CD)
- Language: Russian
- Label: Hor

=== Track listing (1996 and 2000) ===
No.	Title	Music	Length
1.	"Про Иголки И Калитки" (Written by Yegor Letov)		0:29
2.	"Песня О Китайском Народном Добровольце"	Kommunizm	2:26
3.	"Карапында"	Kommunizm	3:25
4.	"Родина Слышит"	Kommunizm	0:52
5.	"Советская Звезда"	Kommunizm	3:25
6.	"Белый Свет"	Kommunizm	3:01
7.	"Часовой"	Grazhdanskaya Oborona	0:14
8.	"Только Бы Не Пёрнуть Теперь"	Kommunizm	6:48
9.	"Митрополит Ипполит"	Kommunizm	0:56
10.	"Опоздавшая Молодёжь"	Tsyganyata i Ya s Ilyicha	3:53
11.	"История Одного Захоронения" (Written by Anna Kon'kova)	Kommunizm	5:51
12.	"Новогодний Тост" (Alternative version)	Kommunizm	3:09
13.	"Колбаса, Донбасс И Я"	Kommunizm	2:46
14.	"Стачка Шахтёров В Кузбассе"	Kommunizm	1:35

Blagodat' III

Compilation album by Kommunizm
- Released: 1996 (cassette) 2000 (CD)
- Language: Russian
- Label: Hor

== Blagodat' III ==
Track listing for Blagodat' III (1996 and 2000)
No.	Title	Music	Length
1.	"Человек (Human)"	Kommunizm	3:39
2.	"Кто Будет Со Мною Тама"	Yegor i Opizdenevshiye	3:39
3.	"Фантом (Phantom)"	Kommunizm	3:45
4.	"Господи, Не Надыть! (Lord, I don't want to breathe!)"	Kommunizm	5:31
5.	"Большое Удовольствие (Great Pleasure)"	Kommunizm	3:43
6.	"Игра В Самолётики Под Кроватью (Playing Airplanes Under the Bed)"	Kommunizm	4:38
7.	"Чёрный Цвет (Black Colour)"	Kommunizm	3:16
8.	"Невский Проспект (Nevsky Prospect)"	Tsiganyata i Ya is Ilyicha	5:17
9.	"Жека Уже В Гамбурге (Zheka is already in Hamburg)"	Yegor i Opizdenevshiye	1:34
10.	"По Моим Да По Гладким Мозгам (In My Smooth Brains)"	Kommunizm	1:15
11.	"Бабочки Сверкают (Butterflies Sparkle)"	Kommunizm	1:15
12.	"Чёрный Ворон (Black Crow)"	Kommunizm	4:47

== Blagodat' IV ==
Blagodat' IV

Compilation album by Kommunizm
- Released: 1996 (Cassette), 2000 (CD)
- Label: Hor

Track listing for Blagodat' IV (1996, 2000)
No.	Title	Music	Length
1.	"Самоискрящийся Чёрный Галун (Self-Sparkling Black Braid)"	Kommunizm	0:33
2.	"Четыре Солдата (Four Soldiers)"	Kommunizm	3:03
3.	"Слепые Спят С Открытыми Глазами (Blind People Sleep With Their Eyes Open)"	Kommunizm	4:07
4.	"Красный Смех (Red Laugh)"	Kommunizm, Yegor i Opizdenevshiye	3:52
5.	"Червяшка (Worm)"	Kommunizm	0:43
6.	"Спать (Sleep)"	Tsiganyata i Ya s Ilyicha	2:39
7.	"Не В Коня Корм (Not a Horse's Feed)"	Kommunizm, Кузя Уо и Христосы на паперти	4:10
8.	"Засиделся За Костром (Stayed up late by the fire)"	Kommunizm	0:49
9.	"Непобедимый (Unbeatable)"	Kommunizm	1:16
10.	"Свадьба (Wedding)"	Kommunizm	3:41
11.	"Папа Римский Пригласил (The Pope Invited)"	Kommunizm	2:07
12.	"Вершки И Корешки (Tops and Roots)"	Kommunizm, Grazhdanskaya Oborona, Yegor Letov	2:42
13.	"Повесть О Настоящем Человеке (The Tale of a Real Man)"		2:38
14.	"Как В Мясной Избушке Умирала Душа (How the Soul Died in the Meat Hut)"	Kommunizm	7:38
15.	"Хроника Пикирующего Бомбардировшика (Chronicle of a Dive Bomber)"	Kommunizm	1:52
