= Nikolai Kharito =

Russian songwriter

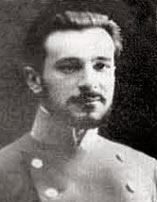
Harito Nikolai Ivanovich (1886-1918). Composer, author of the world-famous romance "Chrysanthemums in the garden have faded for a long time."

Nikolai Ivanovich Kharito (Харито, Николай Иванович; Yalta, 1886 - Tikhoretsk, 1918) was a Russian songwriter. He was shot by a Baron Bongarten at a university friend's wedding in 1918.

== Selected works ==
- "My Dear"
- "Tell me, girls"
- "The Black Eyes"
- "The Chrysanthemum Finished Blossoming"
