= Nikolai Dobronravov =

Soviet-Russian poet (1928–2023)

- Николай Добронравов
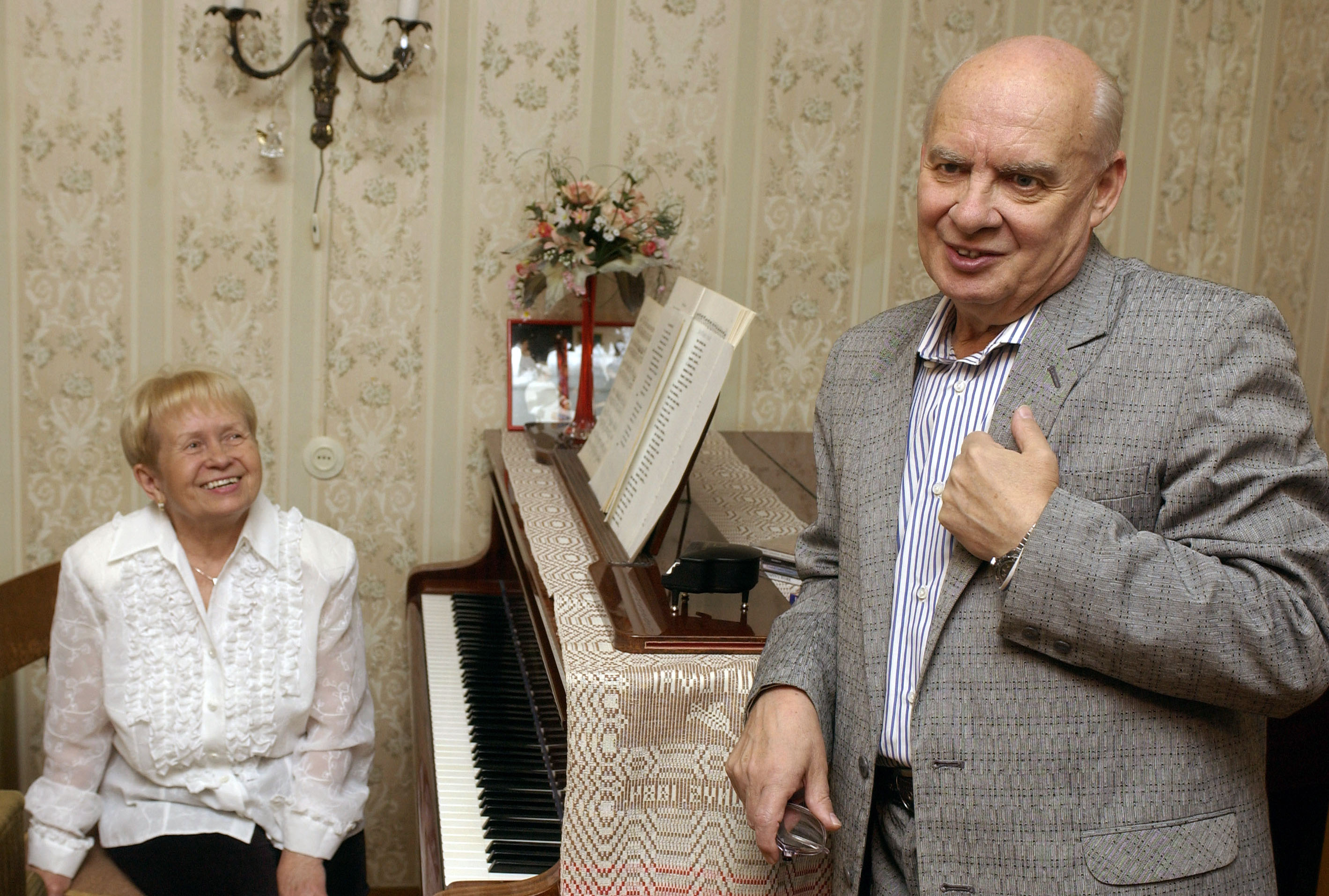
- Dobronravov in 2004
- Born: Nikolai Nikolayevich Dobronravov; 22 November 1928; Leningrad, Russian SFSR, USSR
- Died: 16 September 2023 (aged 94); Moscow, Russia
- Occupations: Poet, lyricist, schoolteacher
- Spouse: Aleksandra Pakhmutova

Nikolai Nikolayevich Dobronravov (Russian: Николай Николаевич Добронравов; 22 November 1928 – 16 September 2023) was a Soviet and Russian poet and lyricist. He collaborated with his wife Aleksandra Pakhmutova.

Dobronravov had two higher educations: in 1950 he graduated from the Moscow Art Theatre School, in 1952 the Moscow City Pedagogical Institute named after Vladimir Potemkin. He died in Moscow on 16 September 2023, at the age of 94.

== Selected compositions ==
- And the Battle Is Going Again
- Belovezhskaya Pushcha (song)
- Do You Know What Kind of Guy He Was
- Hope (Soviet song)
- How Young We Were
- Nezhnost'
- No Coward Plays Hockey!
- The Main Thing, Guys, is Not to Grow Old by Your Heart
- The Team of Our Youth

== Selected discography ==
- 1971 – Gagarin's Constellation (EP, Melodiya Д 00029947-8)
- 2013 – Nikolai Dobronravov. Best... (CD, Melodiya, MEL CD 60 02162)

== Filmography ==
- Sporting Honour (1951) as Platon Platonovich (uncredited)
- The Return of Vasili Bortnikov (1953) as Seryozha
- O Sport, You Are Peace! (1981) as the author of the script (the text and the lyrics)

== Awards and honors ==
- Lenin Komsomol Prize (1978)
- Order of the Badge of Honour (1978)'
- USSR State Prize (1982)
- Order of the Red Banner of Labour (1984)
- Order "For Merit to the Fatherland", 3rd class (2003)
- Order "For Merit to the Fatherland", 2nd class (2008)
