= Aleksandra Pakhmutova =

Russian composer (born 1929)

- Александра Пахмутова
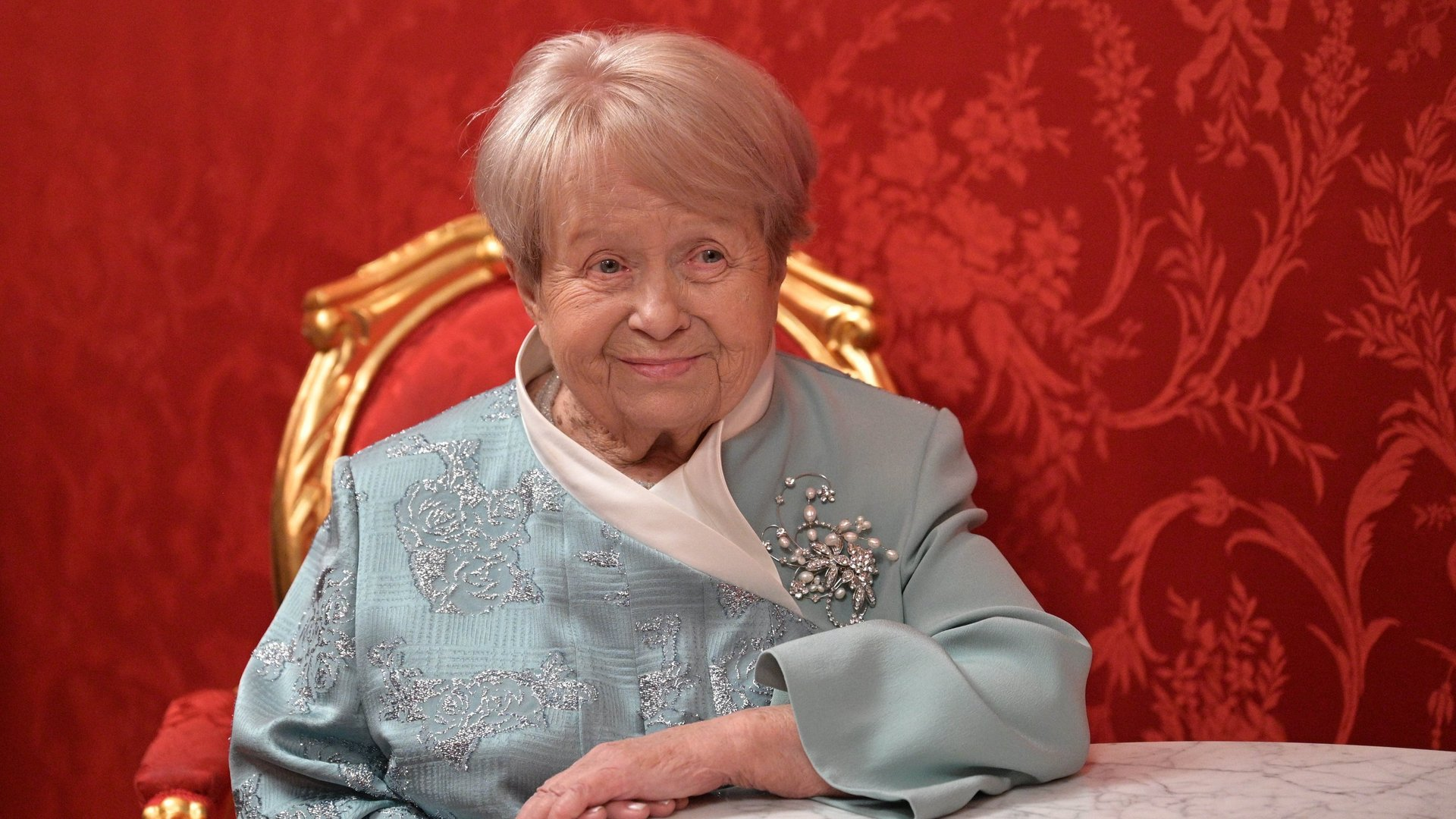
- Pakhmutova in 2024
- Born: Aleksandra Nikolayevna Pakhmutova; 9 November 1929 (age 96); Beketovka, Russian SFSR, Soviet Union
- Education: Moscow Conservatory
- Occupation: Composer
- Years active: 1955–present
- Title: Hero of Labour of the Russian Federation (2024); Hero of Socialist Labour (1990); People's Artist of the USSR (1984)
- Spouse: Nikolai Dobronravov (m. 1956; died 2023)

Aleksandra Nikolayevna Pakhmutova (Russian: Александра Николаевна Пахмутова; born 9 November 1929) is a Soviet and Russian composer. She has remained one of the best-known figures in Soviet and later Russian popular music since she first achieved fame in her homeland in the 1960s. She was awarded the People's Artist of the USSR in 1984.

== Biography ==
She was born on November 9, 1929, in Beketovka (now a neighborhood in Volgograd), Russian SFSR, Soviet Union, and began playing the piano and composing music at an early age. In 1936, she entered the Stalingrad City Music School. After the German invasion of the Soviet Union, she briefly went to Karaganda for refuge and study. She was admitted to the prestigious Moscow Conservatory and graduated in 1953. In 1956, she completed a post-graduate course led by composer Vissarion Shebalin.

Her career is notable for her success in a range of different genres. She has composed pieces for the symphony orchestra (The Russian Suite, the concerto for the trumpet and the orchestra, the Youth Overture, the concerto for the orchestra); the ballet Illumination; music for children (cantatas, a series of choir pieces, and numerous songs); and songs and music for over a dozen different movies from Out of This World in 1958 to Because of Mama in 2001.

She is best known for some of her 400 songs, including such enduringly popular songs as The Melody, Russian Waltz, Tenderness, Hope, The Old Maple Tree, Song of Restless Youth, a series of the Gagarin's Constellation, The Bird of Happiness (from the 1981 film O Sport, You Are Peace!, this song is subsequently very known in both Russia and China when performed by Russian singer Vitas since 2003) and Good-Bye Moscow which was used as the farewell tune of the 22nd Olympic Games in Moscow. Tenderness was used with great effect in Tatyana Lioznova's 1967 film Three Poplars in Plyushchikha. Her husband, the eminent Soviet-era poet Nikolai Dobronravov, contributed lyrics to her music on occasion, including songs used in three films.

One of her most famous ballads is Belovezhskaya Pushcha, composed in 1975, which celebrates Białowieża Forest, a last remnant of the European wildwood split now between Poland and Belarus. Another much-aired song was Malaya Zemlya, about a minor outpost where the then Soviet leader Leonid Brezhnev served as a political commissar during World War II.

Alexandra Pakhmutova found favor with the state establishment as well as the public. Reputedly Brezhnev's favorite composer, she received several Government Awards and State Prizes and served as the Secretary of the USSR and Russian Unions of Composers. She was named a Hero of Socialist Labour in 1990. Her name was given to Asteroid # 1889, registered by the planetary centre in Cincinnati, Ohio, United States.

== Personal life ==
In 1956, Pakhmutova married an actor and poet Nikolai Dobronravov. He was assigned by the radio officials to work with her as a lyricist on a children's tune "Little Motor Boat" (Lodochka motornaya). They have written a lot of songs for children but the couple didn't have children of their own.

== Compositions ==
=== Songs ===
Pakhmutova is accredited with composing over 500 individual songs; and thus, only the most well-known are listed here.

- «Надежда» ("The Hope")
- «Песня о тревожной молодости|Песня о тревожной молодости» ("Song of Restless Youth")
- «Мелодия» ("Melody")
- «Беловежская пуща» ("Białowieża Forest")
- «Нежность» ("Tenderness")
- «Команда молодости нашей» ("Our Youth Team")
- «Старый клён» ("Old Maple")
- «Как молоды мы были» ("How Young We Were")
- «Трус не играет в хоккей» ("No Coward Plays Hockey")
- «И вновь продолжается бой» ("And the Battle Is Going Again")
- «Слава вперёдсмотрящему» ("Glory to the Ones Who Look Forward")
- «Знаете, каким он парнем был» ("Do You Know What Kind of Guy He Was")

=== Vocal cycles ===
- Gagarin's Constellation
- Songs about Lenin
- Aiga Stars
- Motherland
- Hugging the Sky

=== Orchestral ===
- 1953: Russian Suite for symphony orchestra
- "Ode to Lighting the Fire" (for mixed choir and symphony orchestra).
- 1957: Music for children: Suite "Lenin in our heart"
- 1972: Heroes of Sport (Written for the final credits of the Russian sports movie Moving Up)

=== Concerto ===
- 1955: Trumpet Concerto
- 1972: Concerto for Orchestra (based on the ballet Illumination, staged in 1974, Bolshoi Theatre, Moscow)

=== Cantata ===
- Beautiful as youth, country
- 1953: Vasily Turkin
- 1962: Red Pathfinders
- 1972: Squad Songs

=== Overtures ===
- 1957: Youth
- 1958: Thuringia
- 1967: Merry Girls
- 1967: Russian Holiday, for the orchestra of Russian folk instruments

=== Instrumental ===
- The Rhythms of Time
- Carnival
- Auftakt
- Robinsonade (from the film "My Love in the Third Year of Study")
- Heart in the palm
- A moment of luck
- Morning big city
- Elegy (from the film O Sport, You Are Peace!)

=== Film scores ===
- The Girls (1961)
- There Was an Old Couple (1965)
- Three Poplars in Plyushchikha (1968)
- O Sport, You Are Peace! (1981; together with Sándor Kallós)
- Battle of Moscow (1985)

== Recordings ==
1. 1971: Concerto for Orchestra in E Major (USSR State Academic Symphony Orchestra, under Yevgeny Svetlanov)
2. 1985: Marshal Zhukov March (from film "Battle of Moscow," Central Military band of Ministry of Defence of USSR, under Colonel Anatoly Maltsev)
3. 2015: Concerto for solo Trumpet and Orchestra (Trumpet Records, Timofei Dokschitzer)
4. 2019: Anniversary Concert for Aleksandra Pakhmutova (Bolshoi Theater, under Mikhail Pletnev and Yuri Bashmet)

== Honors and awards ==
Soviet and Russian

- Hero of Socialist Labour № 21035 (29 October 1990) – for outstanding contributions to the development of Soviet musical art and productive social activities
- Hero of Labour of the Russian Federation (9 November 2024) – for special merits to the development of national musical art, multifaceted social activities and many years of fruitful creative work
- Two Orders of Lenin № ****** & № 460143 (6 November 1979 and 29 October 1990)
- Order of St. Andrew (28 October 2019)
- Order "For Merit to the Fatherland";
  - 1st class (9 November 2009) – for outstanding contribution to the development of national musical art, and many years of creative activity
  - 2nd class (27 December 1999) – for great personal contribution to the development of musical art
  - 3rd class (29 September 2014) – for great contribution to the development of domestic musical art and achieved creative success
- Order of the Red Banner of Labour, twice (1967, 1971)
- Order of Friendship of Peoples (1986)
- State Prize of the Russian Federation (12 June 2015)
- USSR State Prize (1975) – for the songs of recent years (1971–1974)
- USSR State Prize (1982) – for the music for the film O Sport, You Are Peace! (1981)
- Lenin Komsomol Prize (1966) – a song cycle about youth and the Komsomol Prize of the Union State of Russia and Belarus for literary and artistic works that make a significant contribution to strengthening the relations of brotherhood, friendship and comprehensive cooperation between the countries – members of the Union State (10 March 2004)
- Honored Art Worker of the RSFSR (1971)
- People's Artist of the RSFSR (1977)
- People's Artist of the USSR (1984)
- Honorary Citizen of Volgograd (19 October 1993)
- Honorary Citizen of Bratsk (26 August 1994)
- Honorary citizen of Moscow (13 September 2000)

Foreign

- Order of Francysk Skaryna (Belarus, 3 April 2000) – for outstanding work on the development and strengthening of the Belarusian-Russian cultural relations

Public

- Order of St. Euphrosyne, Grand Duchess of Moscow, 2nd class (Russian Orthodox Church, 2008)
- The title "Living Legend" by the national Russian award "Ovation" (2002)
- The award "Russian National Olympus" (2004)

Awards
Ovation
Preceded by 2001 Igor Moiseyev	Living Legend Award; 2002; Aleksandra Pakhmutova	Succeeded by 2008 Mstislav Rostropovich; Muslim Magomayev; Maria Mulyash
