= Music of the Soviet Union =

The music of the Soviet Union varied in many genres and epochs. The majority of it was considered to be part of the Russian culture, but other national cultures from the Republics of the Soviet Union made significant contributions as well. The Soviet state supported musical institutions, but also carried out content censorship. According to Vladimir Lenin, "Every artist, everyone who considers himself an artist, has the right to create freely according to his ideal, independently of everything. However, we are communists and we must not stand with folded hands and let chaos develop as it pleases. We must systemically guide this process and form its result."

== Classical music of the Soviet Union ==
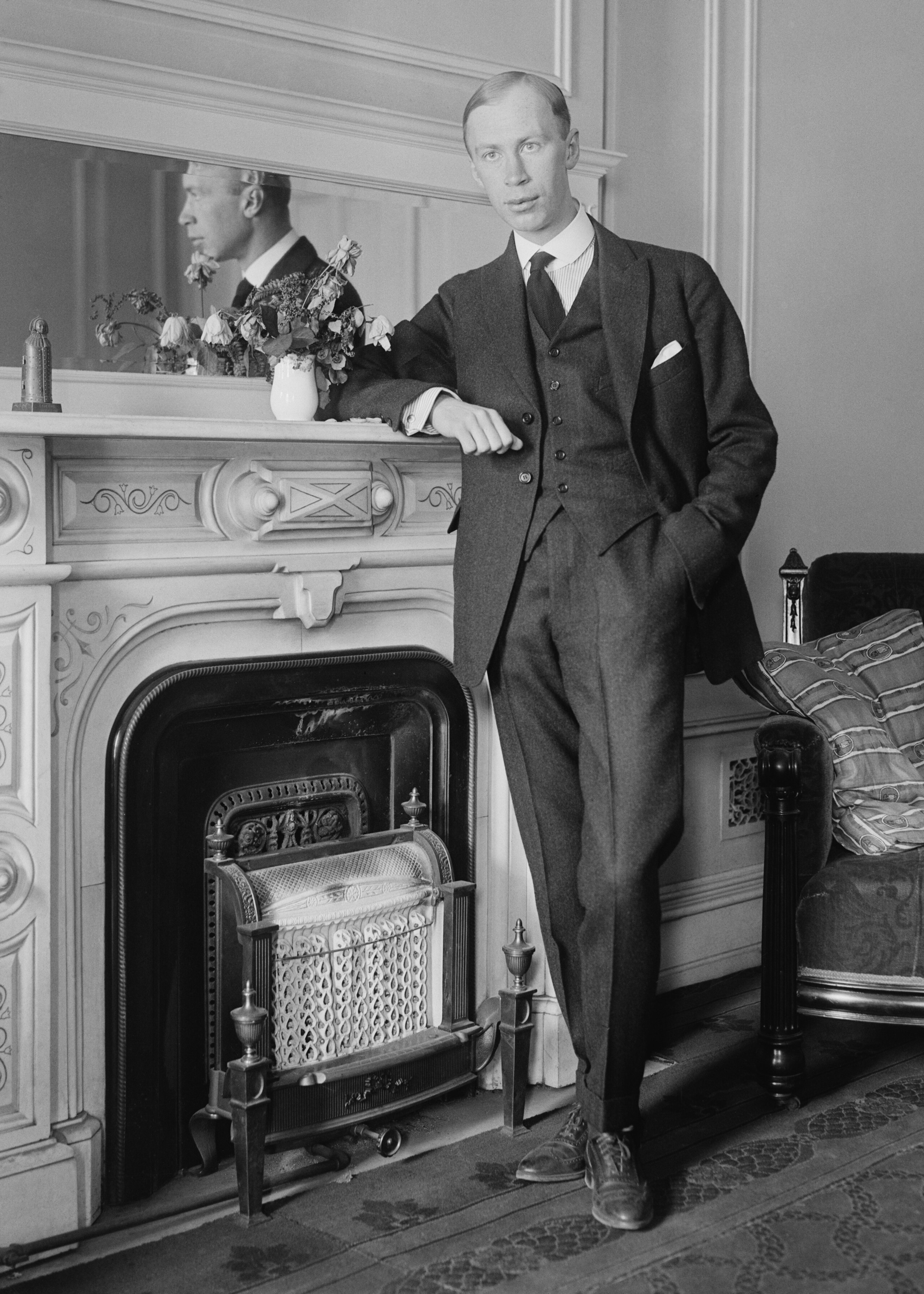
Sergei Prokofiev, one of the major composers of the 20th century

Classical music of the Soviet Union developed from the music of the Russian Empire. It gradually evolved from the experiments of the revolutionary era, such as orchestras with no conductors, towards classicism favored under Joseph Stalin's office.

The music patriarchs of the era were Sergei Prokofiev, Dmitri Shostakovich and Aram Khachaturian. With time, a wave of younger Soviet composers, including Georgy Sviridov, Tikhon Khrennikov, and Alfred Schnittke managed to break through.

Many musicians from the Soviet era have established themselves as world's leading artists: violinists David Oistrakh, Leonid Kogan, Gidon Kremer, Viktor Tretiakov and Oleg Kagan; cellists Mstislav Rostropovich, Daniil Shafran, and Natalia Gutman; violist Yuri Bashmet; pianists Sviatoslav Richter, Emil Gilels and many other musicians.

=== Music in Stalin's early years ===
After Joseph Stalin had succeeded in expelling Leon Trotsky from the Central Committee in 1927, he very soon cut off connections with the West and established an isolationist state. Stalin rejected Western culture and its ‘bourgeois principles,’ as these did not agree with the policies of the Soviet Communist Party or the working class. The Association of Contemporary Musicians (ACM), a faction of more progressive Soviet musicians, who had thrived from exposure to the West during the NEP years, quickly dissolved without the support of the worker's state. Former members of the ACM joined the Russian Association of Proletarian Musicians (RAPM). The RAPM, composed of ‘reactionary proletarians,’ opposed Western music ideals, instead seeking to encourage traditional Russian music. Conflict between reactionaries and progressives (former ACM members) within the RAPM ensued. Although the Communist Party supported the reactionaries, it did not directly act to resolve the conflict; the party's attention during this period was instead focused on the Soviet Union's economic development. In 1932, the RAPM was disbanded in favor of a new organization: the Union of Soviet Composers (USC).

=== Stalin's Second Revolution of 1932 ===
The year 1932 marked a new cultural movement of Soviet nationalism. The party pursued its agenda through the newly founded Union of Soviet Composers, a division of the Ministry of Culture. Musicians who hoped to gain the financial support of the Communist Party were obligated to join the USC. Composers were expected to present new works to the organization to be approved before publication. The USC stated that this process aimed to guide young musicians to successful careers. Thus, through the USC, the Communist Party was able to control the direction of new music.

Stalin applied the notion of socialist realism to classical music. Maxim Gorky first introduced socialist realism in a literary context in the early 20th century. Socialist realism demanded that all mediums of art convey the struggles and triumphs of the proletariat. It was an inherently Soviet movement: a reflection of Soviet life and society. Composers were expected to abandon Western progressivism in favor of simple, traditional Russian and Soviet melodies. In 1934, Prokofiev wrote in his diary about the compositional necessity for a "new simplicity," a new lyricism that he believed would be a source of national pride for the Soviet people. Peter and the Wolf is a good illustration of the kind of consonance that existed between Prokofiev's artistic vision and Soviet ideals. Additionally, music served as a powerful propaganda agent, as it glorified the proletariat and the Soviet regime. Stalin's greatness became a theme of countless Soviet songs, a trend that he attempted to stop on more than one occasion. Communist ideals and promotion of the party were thus the foundations of this cultural movement.

Ivan Dzerzhinsky's opera, Tikhii Don, composed in 1935 became the model for socialist realism in music. Upon seeing the opera, Stalin himself praised the work, as it featured themes of patriotism while using simple, revolutionary melodies. Composers were writing for a proletarian audience; Dzerzhinsky's Tikhii Don met this expectation. On the other hand, Shostakovich's opera, Lady Macbeth of the Mtsensk District, first performed in 1934, resulted in disaster for the prodigious composer. Although Shostakovich's work was initially critically well received, Stalin and the Communist Party found the opera's themes of a "pre-socialist, petty-bourgeois, Russian mentality" entirely inappropriate. Pravda, a state-sponsored newspaper, harshly criticized Shostakovich's opera. Thus, these two operas provided composers with an indication of the direction the Communist Party planned to lead Soviet music. Soviet music should have been music the common workingman could understand and take pride in. This marked a stark change in party policy from the unrestricted freedoms of the early Soviet years.

=== Classical music during the Second World War ===
The Nazi invasion of the Soviet Union in June 1941 stunned the unready Soviet forces. Stalin's administration was forced to react quickly and devote all its resources into the war effort. As a result, Soviet music witnessed a relaxation of restrictions on expression. This period was a break from the policies of the 1930s. The Communist Party, seeing as it was allied with several Western powers, focused on patriotic propaganda rather than anti-Western rhetoric. With a restored connection to the west, Soviet music experienced a revival, with more modernist and innovative themes.

Composers responded to their new freedoms with music laden with themes of patriotism and military triumph. Wartime music featured a reemergence of grand symphonic works compared to the simplistic ‘song operas’ (such as Tikhii Don) of the 1930s. Sergei Prokofiev, Nikolai Myaskovsky, Aram Khachaturian and Shostakovich each composed war symphonies. Chamber music, a genre that had fallen out of favor in the previous decade, was also revitalized. Wartime music aimed to boost Soviet morale both at home and on the battlefront, and it was successful, especially as the Soviet army began to gain momentum against the Nazis in 1942.

=== Zhdanovism and a return to the policies of the 1930s ===
Following the end of the war, the Communist Party refocused on isolationism and culture control. Stalin appointed Andrei Zhdanov in 1946 to carry out this return to the policies of the 1930s. Zhdanovism meant a reemphasis on socialist realism, as well as anti-Western sentiment. The Communist party again encouraged composers to incorporate themes of the Russian Revolution, as well as nationalist tunes. Zhdanov castigated composers on an individual basis, particularly Prokofiev and Shostakovich, for embracing Western ideals during the war. Tikhon Khrennikov, meanwhile, was appointed head of the Union of Soviet Composers. Khrennikov would become one of the most despised figures among Soviet musicians, as the USC embraced a greater role in censorship.

Reaction to the Communist Party's restrictions varied with the different generations of composers. The younger generation largely strove to conform, although the music they produced was simplistic and bare in structure. Desperate to find acceptable melodies, composers incorporated folk tunes into their music. Some composers, Prokofiev and Shostakovich included, turned to film music. Shostakovich, among others, withheld his more expressive and perhaps controversial works until after Stalin's death. Shostakovich was honored by Stalin and the Soviets for his brilliant music, despite Stalin not liking the direction some of his music took. The complex tonal structures and progressive themes that were prevalent during the war slowly disappeared. The years after the war and prior to the cultural Thaw under Nikita Khrushchev thus marked a rapid decline in Soviet music.

=== The Khrushchev Thaw ===
Nikita Khrushchev's 1953 rise to power inaugurated a period of moderate liberalization in Soviet culture often dubbed the "Khruschev Thaw". This period marked an end to the anti-formalist persecutions of the late 1940s and early 50s. Composers who had fallen out of favor during the final Stalin years returned to the public eye, and pieces which had previously been deemed unsuitable for public presentation for their unorthodoxy were once again performed. Many of Dmitri Shostakovich's early banned works, including his first opera and his symphonies, were rehabilitated over the course of Khrushchev's premiership. Western musicians like Leonard Bernstein and Glenn Gould also toured the Soviet Union for the first time in the late 1950s.

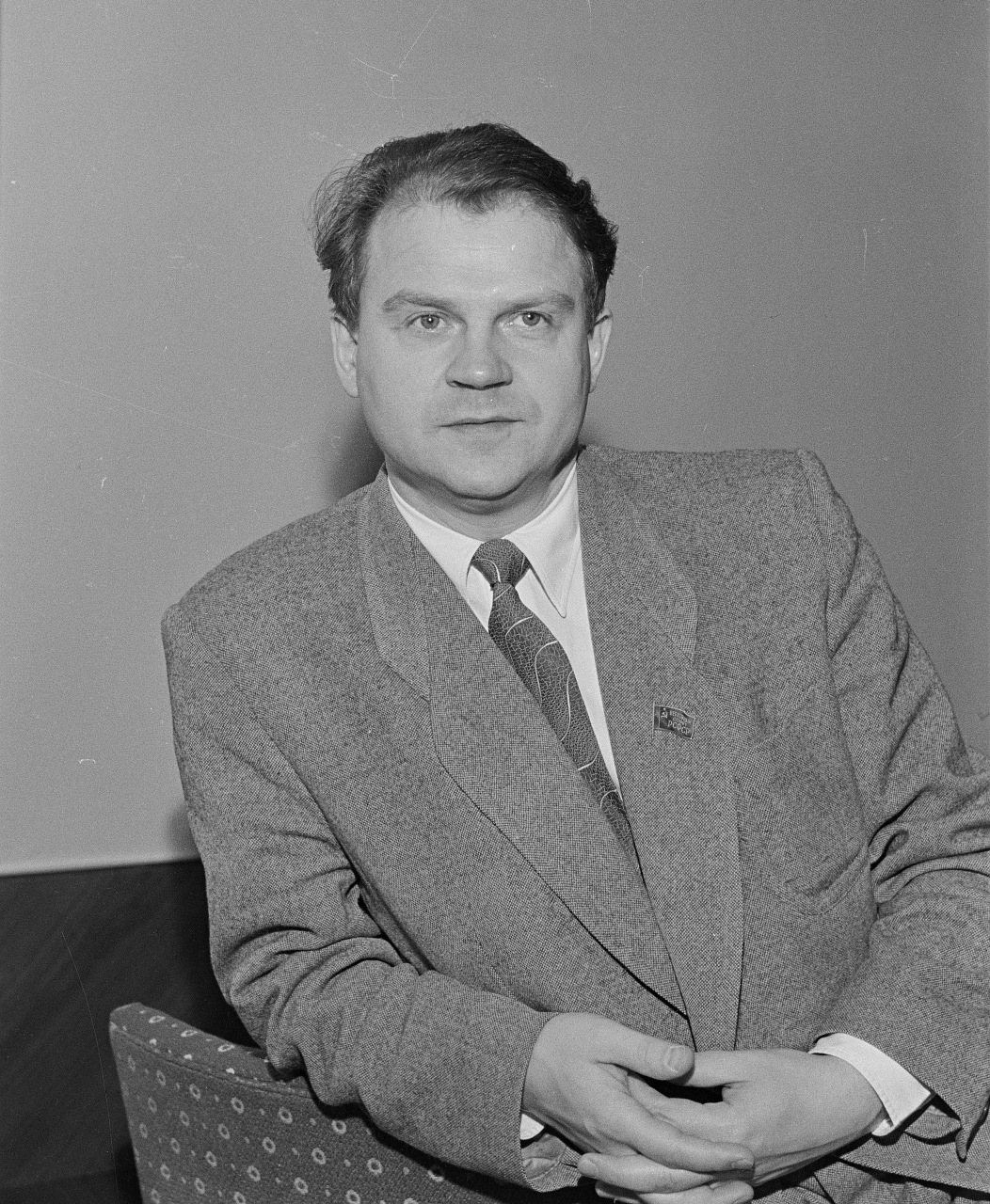
Tikhon Khrennikov, head of Union of Soviet Composers 1948–1991

The Khrushchev administration also solidified the position of the Union of Soviet Composers (USC) as the dominant administrative authority over the state sponsorship of classical music, a process which began during the later Stalin years. Tikhon Khrennikov, a composer by trade, led the USC from 1948 to 1991 as one of the only Stalin-era political appointees to remain in power until the Soviet Union's 1991 collapse. Khrennikov's USC actively attempted to undo the policies of Zhdanovischina, the campaign of ideological purity waged by Stalin's second in command Andrei Zhdanov from 1946 to 1948. In 1958, Khrennikov persuaded Khrushchev to officially rehabilitate many of the artists indicted in Zhdanov's 1948 "Resolution on Music of the Central Committee of the Communist Party", a document censuring composers whose music failed to sufficiently realize the socialist realist aesthetic.

=== Official Soviet Music, 1953–1991 ===
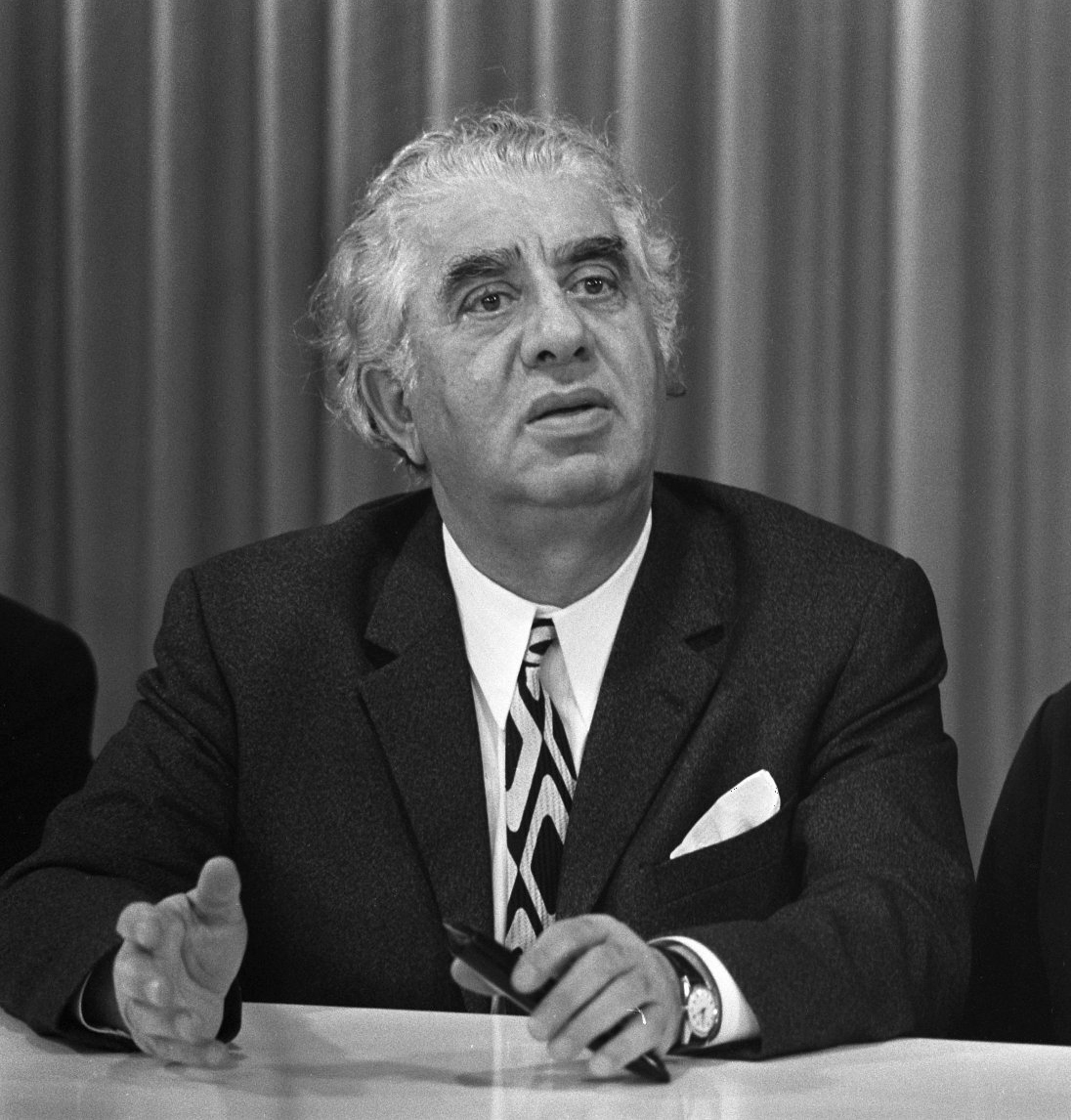
Aram Khachaturian, considered one of the leading Soviet composers

The Khrushchev Thaw yielded greater artistic autonomy for Soviet composers and musicians, but it did not end the state's involvement in the production of classical music. Though the Union of Soviet Composers (USC) now rarely endorsed the outright imprisonment of unorthodox composers, it often blocked state sponsorship for composers it deemed unrepresentative of the Communist Party's ideological position. The Communist Party remained opposed to techniques developed by Western modernist composers, especially atonal harmony and serialism. For example, serialist composers like Arnold Schoenberg and Anton Webern were not covered in official Soviet music curriculum of the late fifties and early sixties, including that of the premiere Moscow Conservatory. Over the course of the 1960s, these techniques were gradually introduced into the Soviet musical vocabulary- by 1971, even Khrennikov, the embodiment of the Soviet musical establishment, employed a serialist twelve-tone melody in his Piano concerto no. 2 in C major.

The conservative posture towards the introduction of new techniques into the musical repertoire was only one arm of the aesthetic of "socialist realism". In addition to its general adherence to the stylistic norms of the late-nineteenth and early-twentieth century, socialist realism in Soviet classical music expressed itself as a heroic focus on working class life and Soviet revolutionary iconography. Sergei Prokofiev's Cantata for the Twentieth Anniversary of the October Revolution is the prototypical socialist realist composition, written in 1937 but not performed until 1966. Prokofiev's cantata romanticizes the events of the Bolshevik rise to power, set to a libretto drawn from the writings of socialist heroes Marx, Lenin, and Stalin. The 1964 Kursk Songs by Georgy Sviridov also embody socialist realist aesthetic. Sviridov's song cycle depicts pastoral scenes of peasant life in the composer's native Kursk, adopting Western Russian folk melodies and styles.

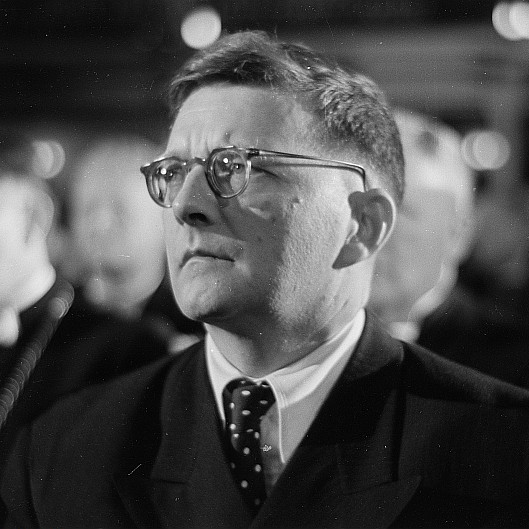
Dmitriy Shostakovich, leading composer of the Soviet era

The music of Dmitriy Shostakovich defined the dominant style of Soviet classical music for subsequent generations of Soviet composers. Though Shostakovich had fallen out of favor with the Party following his denunciation by Zhdanov in the late 1940s, his status as the premiere Soviet composer was gradually re-established through the Khrushchev Thaw until his death in 1975. The USC under Khrennikov favored Shostakovich's mastery of conventional classical forms, upholding his 15 monumental symphonies alongside the works of pre-Soviet masters like Gustav Mahler as examples for young Soviet composers to follow. The Party's idolization of classical masters like Shostakovich stood in deliberate contrast to their disdain for experimental composers who eschewed traditional classical norms. Several prominent Soviet composers have been described as disciples of Shostakovich, including Georgy Svirdov. His influence touched the work of nearly every composer of the post-Stalin era, who either adhered to or reacted against the musical language he authored.

=== Unofficial Soviet Music, 1953–1991 ===
Following the end of Stalin-era persecutions, a new cadre of Soviet avant-garde composers developed parallel to the mainstream, state-sponsored musical establishment. The foundation of the Soviet experimental tradition is often traced to composer Andrey Volkonsky. In 1954, Volkonsky was expelled from the Moscow Conservatory for his unorthodox style of composition and lackadaisical approach to his studies. Despite his abandonment by the Soviet musical establishment, Volkonsky continued to write music. In 1956, he went on to compose Musica Stricta, a solo piano work usually acknowledged as the first use of twelve-tone serialism in Soviet classical music.

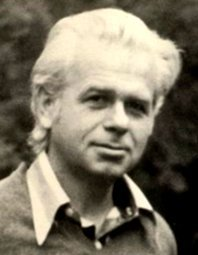
Edison Denisov, experimental Soviet composer

Volkonsky's experimentation during the late 1950s and early 1960s eventually inspired more musicians to rebel against the strictures which had until then governed Soviet classical composition. This new generation of avant-gardists included composers such as Edison Denisov, Sofia Gubaidulina, Alfred Schnittke, and Arvo Pärt. Each composer contributed their own unique innovations. Denisov continued Volkonsky's exploration of serialist techniques, while Gubaidulina incorporated previously unacceptable religious themes into her music. Pärt expressed his spirituality with his stark, minimalist musical style. Schnittke became known for his polystylistic compositions, which often simultaneously incorporated several conflicting styles and themes, blurring the static distinctions between genres.

In 1979, Khrennikov publicly denounced Denisov and other experimental composers in a public address to the composer's union, and similar attacks surfaced in state-sponsored media like Pravda. Despite facing clear opposition in the Communist party, the prestige of the Soviet avant-garde only grew both domestically and abroad. In April 1982, the Moscow Conservatory held a concert featuring works of Denisov, Gubaidulina, and Schnittke. Before this landmark event, the works of the avant-garde had been barred from performance in the leading concert halls of Moscow and Leningrad. From this point forward, until the collapse of the Soviet Union in 1991, the place of the experimental composers was grudgingly acknowledged by the Soviet musical establishment.

== Electronic music ==
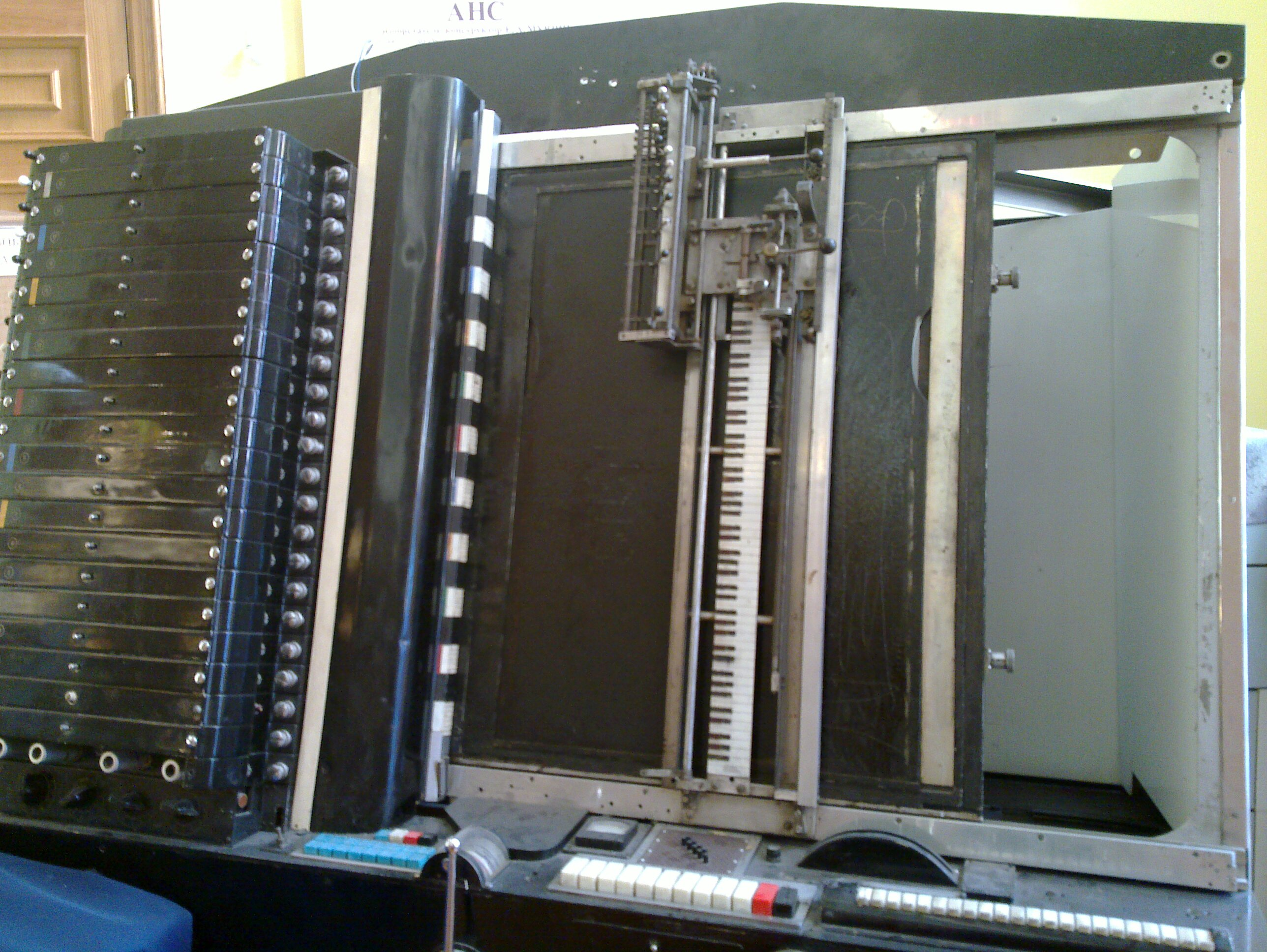
ANS synthesizer exhibited at Glinka Museum

In 1929, Nikolai Obukhov invented the "sounding cross" (la croix sonore), comparable to the principle of the theremin. In the 1930s, Nikolai Ananyev invented "sonar", and engineer Alexander Gurov — neoviolena, I. Ilsarov — ilston., A. Rimsky-Korsakov and A. Ivanov — emiriton. Composer and inventor Arseny Avraamov was engaged in scientific work on sound synthesis and conducted a number of experiments that would later form the basis of Soviet electro-musical instruments.

In 1956 Vyacheslav Mescherin created the Ensemble of electro-musical instruments, which used theremins, electric harps, electric organs, the first synthesizer in the USSR "Ekvodin", and also created the first Soviet reverb machine. The style in which Meshcherin's ensemble played is known as "Space age pop". In 1957, engineer Igor Simonov assembled a working model of a noise recorder (electroeoliphone), with the help of which it was possible to extract various timbres and consonances of a noise nature. In 1958, Evgeny Murzin designed ANS synthesizer, one of the world's first polyphonic musical synthesizers.

By the end of the 1960s, musical groups playing light electronic music appeared in the USSR. At the state level, this music began to be used to attract foreign tourists to the country and for broadcasting to foreign countries.

Founded by Murzin in 1966, the Moscow Experimental Electronic Music Studio became the base for a new generation of experimenters – Eduard Artemyev, Alexander Nemtin, Sándor Kallós, Sofia Gubaidulina, Alfred Schnittke, and Vladimir Martynov. The Baltic Soviet Republics also had their own pioneers: in Estonian SSR — Sven Grunberg, in Lithuanian SSR — Gedrus Kupriavicius, in Latvian SSR — Opus and Zodiac.

In the mid-1970s, composer Alexander Zatsepin designed an "orchestrolla" – a modification of the mellotron. Zatsepin's work for the animated film The Mystery of the Third Planet became a cult classic and often described as a milestone in Soviet electronic music.

In 1985, "Melodiya", together with the USSR Sports Committee, released a series of records "Sport and Music", designed in electro and chiptune music style.

=== Soviet synthesizers ===
- Aelita
- ANS synthesizer
- Graphical sound
- Musical Instrument Factory of Riga
- Optophonic Piano
- Polivoks
- Rhythmicon
- Terpsitone
- Theremin
- Variophone

== Film soundtracks ==
"Enthusiast's March" was a popular mass song of the Soviet Union that was first performed in the film "Светлый путь" (Shining Path) in 1940.

Film soundtracks produced a significant part of popular Soviet/Russian songs of the time, as well as orchestral and experimental music. During the 1930s, Sergei Prokofiev's composed scores for Sergei Eisenstein films, such as Alexander Nevsky, and also soundtracks by Isaak Dunayevsky that ranged from classical pieces to popular jazz. Among the pioneers of Soviet electronica was 1970s ambient composer Eduard Artemyev, best known for his scores to science fiction films by Tarkovsky. Many films produced in the Soviet Union were patriotic in nature and the music in such films also carried a positive tone of Soviet pride, incorporating aspects of folk music and other Russian musical influences, in addition to the influences of the ethnic communities that made up the federal state's 14 other republics.

The Red Army is the Strongest and the State Anthem of the Union of Soviet Socialist Republics are both used in the 2014 film Red Army. The original version of the anthem prior to de-Stalinization was used in the 1985 film, Rocky IV.

The Red Army is the Strongest was played in the first scene of the first episode of the third season of Stranger Things. The first two lines and then the last 8 lines were played. It was sung by The Red Army Choir. The song is reused in the first episode of the fourth season of Stranger Things.

== Popular music ==
=== Early Soviet years ===
Popular music during the early years of the Soviet period was essentially Russian music. One of the most well-known songs "Katyusha" by Matvei Blanter is close to the melodic, rhythmic, and harmonic structures of Russian romantic songs of the 19th century. It was an adaptation of folk motifs to the theme of soldiers during wartime.

Many of the most frequently performed songs in Soviet Russia came from the international revolutionary movement of the late 19th and early 20th centuries. A noteworthy example is the song "Varshavianka", which originated in Poland and became popularized with the Russian Revolution. The song is characterized by an intense rhythm and calls for "To bloody battle, holy and righteous." There was also the song "The Red Banner" (Красное Знамя) which originated in France. One of the most commonly known songs is "Boldly, Comrades, in Step" (Смело, товарищи, в ногу) and the funeral march "You Fell Victim" (Вы жертвою пали).

In the 1930s, songs from film soundtracks, including marches, became highly popular. They include If Tomorrow Brings War (Если завтра война) and Three Tankmen (Три Танкиста) by the Pokrass brothers and Tachanka by Listov, which have patriotic themes.

=== Soviet music ===
In the official Soviet musicology, "Soviet music is a qualitatively new stage of the development of musical arts." It was based on the principles of socialist realism and formed under the immediate control and sponsorship of the Soviet state and the Communist Party of the Soviet Union.

==== Soviet song ====
Main categories recognized by Soviet musicology within the Soviet song genre were mass song, "stage song" (estradnaya pesnya), and "everyday song" (bytovaya pesnya).

Mass songs were usually but not all composed as marches by composers and writers, majority for choral singing, with some composed for individual singers. Typically these songs are of optimistic or heroic character, with ideological or historical themes written. These included a number of film, TV movie or TV series soundtracks.

Among those categorized as everyday songs were folk songs.

=== 1930–1960s: Soviet jazz ===
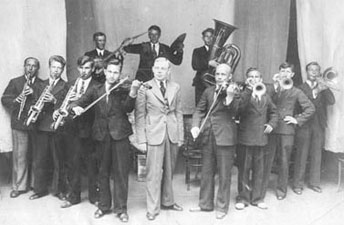
The Orchestra of Valentin Sporius, 1937, Kuybyshev

Jazz music was introduced to Soviet audiences by Valentin Parnakh in the 1920s. Pianist Alexander Tsfasman, singer Leonid Utyosov and film score composer Isaak Dunayevsky helped its popularity, especially with the popular comedy film Jolly Fellows that featured a jazz soundtrack. Eddie Rosner, Oleg Lundstrem, Coretti Arle-Titz and others contributed to Soviet jazz music.

In the late 1940s, during the "anti-cosmopolitanism" campaigns, jazz music suffered from ideological oppression, as it was labeled "bourgeois" music. Many bands were dissolved, and those that remained avoided being labeled as jazz bands. Fans copied jazz recordings using handmade tools; the resulting gramophone records were known as ribs.

In the 1950s underground samizdat jazz journals and records became more common to disseminate musical literature and music.

However, in the early 1960s during the "Khrushchev Thaw", Soviet Jazz saw a minor comeback. Further information:

- Mikael Tariverdiev
- Vladimir Dashkevich
- Georgy Garanian

Jazz-rock

In 1970s, jazz-rock scene began to evolve. Arsenal, founded by Aleksei Kozlov, is considered the preeminent Jazz-rock fusion ensemble in USSR.

=== Soviet estrada ===
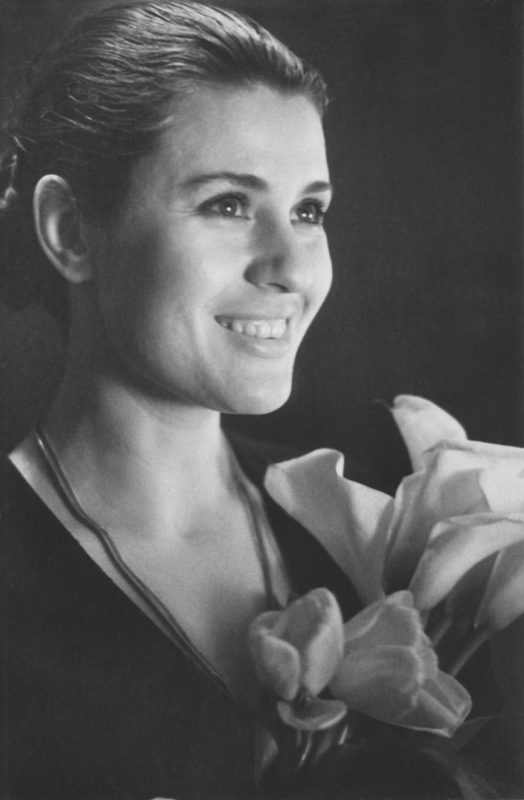
Valentina Tolkunova

The term "estrada artists" in the Soviet period usually referred to performers of traditional Popular music (although the actual term estrada (stage) is much wider) accompanied by symphony orchestras (with occasional choral backup). They sang songs written by professional composers and poets/songwriters. The songs were designed for vocal prowess, had clear, catchy melodies, accompaniment is given to a secondary role. Therefore, Soviet estrada was dominated by solo singers with good vocal abilities, not to play the instrument and its repertoire writing themselves. The songs played by these singers constitute the stage song genre in the Soviet Union.

Among the artists of the early period were Leonid Utesov (also one of the pioneers of Soviet jazz), Mark Bernes, Lyubov Orlova, Coretti Arle-Titz, Klavdiya Shulzhenko, Rashid Behbudov. Among the many artists of the Khrushchev Thaw and the Era of Stagnation were Yuri Gulyaev, Larisa Mondrus, Aida Vedishcheva, Tamara Miansarova, Lidia Klement, Eduard Khil, Maria Pakhomenko, Edita Piekha, Vladimir Troshin, Maya Kristalinskaya, Vadim Mulerman, Heli Lääts, Uno Loop, Anna German, Valery Obodzinsky, Joseph Kobzon, Muslim Magomayev, Valentina Tolkunova, Lyudmila Zykina, Lev Leshchenko, Lyudmila Senchina, Leonid Smetannikov, Sofia Rotaru, Alla Pugacheva, Valery Leontiev and Sergei Zakharov - all of them graduates of music courses in universities and conservatories. Songs by these artists are often included in the soundtracks for films and television dramas, TV movies and miniseries, and vice versa, for songs from film and TV soundtracks were and are often included in the repertoire of estrada artists.

As traditional popular music was the main official direction of Soviet estrada, it was subjected to a particularly rigorous censorship. Usually the songs were composed by members of the Union of Composers (the most famous among them being Aleksandra Pakhmutova, Vasily Solovyov-Sedoi, Tikhon Khrennikov, David Tukhmanov, Raimonds Pauls, Yevgeny Krylatov etc.) and song lyrics were written by professional and trustworthy poets and songwriters who also were USC members (Mikhail Matusovsky, Vasily Lebedev-Kumach, Nikolai Dobronravov, Robert Rozhdestvensky, Mikhail Tanich, Leonid Derbenyov, Yuri Entin, Ilya Reznik, Grigore Vieru). All this is defined as the high demands on the material and the narrow limits of creativity, especially lyrically. The estrada songs mostly then were about love, nature or about patriotism, ideology, history and national pride.

=== 1960-80s: the VIAs ===
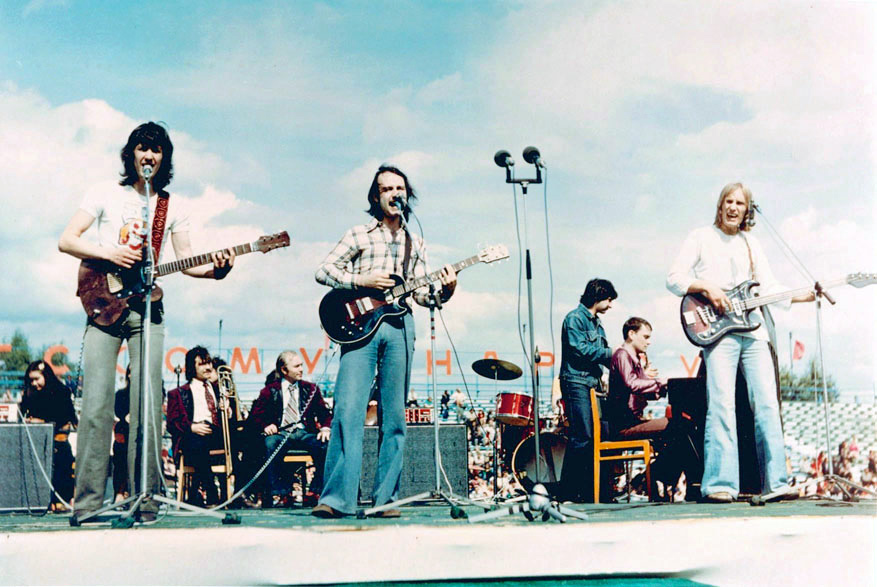
A typical 70s Soviet VIA, Tsvety, in the hippie-inspired dress of the era

The 1960s saw the rise of the VIA (Vocalno-instrumentalny ansambl, vocal&instrumental ensemble) movement. VIAs were state-produced bands of professional musicians with conservatory backgrounds, often performing songs written for them by professional composers and writers of the Union of Composers such as Aleksandra Pakhmutova, Yan Frenkel and Raimonds Pauls. Among the most notable VIA bands and vocalists were Pesniary, a folk band from Belarus; Zemlyane, Poyushchiye Gitary, Yuri Antonov with Arax and Stas Namin with Tsvety.

To break through into the mainstream with state-owned Soviet media, any band should have become an officially recognized VIA. Each VIA had an artistic director (художественный руководитель) who acted as manager, producer, and state supervisor. In some bands, namely Pesniary, the artistic director was also the band's leading member and songwriter.

Soviet VIAs developed a specific style of pop music. They performed youth-oriented, yet officially approved radio-friendly music. A mix of western and Soviet trends of the time, VIA combined traditional songs with elements of rock, disco and new wave. Folk music instruments were often used, as well as keytars. Many VIAs had up to ten members including a number of vocalists and Multi-instrumentalists, whom were in constant rotation.

Due to state censorship, the lyrics of VIAs used to be "family-friendly". Typical lyrical topics were emotions such as love, joy and sadness. Many bands also praised national culture and patriotism, especially those of national minorities from smaller Soviet republics.

=== 1960–70s: Bard music ===
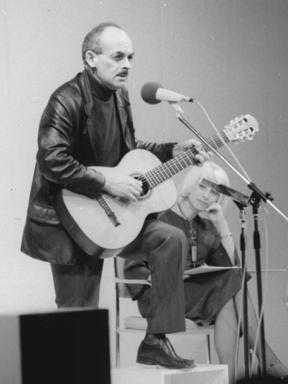
Bulat Okudzhava, a bard

The singer-songwriter movement of the Soviet Union is deeply rooted in amateur folklore songs played by students, tourists and traveling geologists. It became highly popular in the 1960s and was sometimes considered as an alternative to official VIAs. Music characteristics of the genre consist of simple, easily repeatable parts, usually played by a single acoustic guitar player who simultaneously sang. Among the singer-songwriters, termed as "bards", the most popular were Bulat Okudzhava, Vladimir Vysotsky, Yuri Vizbor, Sergey Nikitin and Tatyana Nikitina. Lyrics played the most important role in Bard music, and bards were more like poets than musicians.

=== 1980s: Russian rock ===
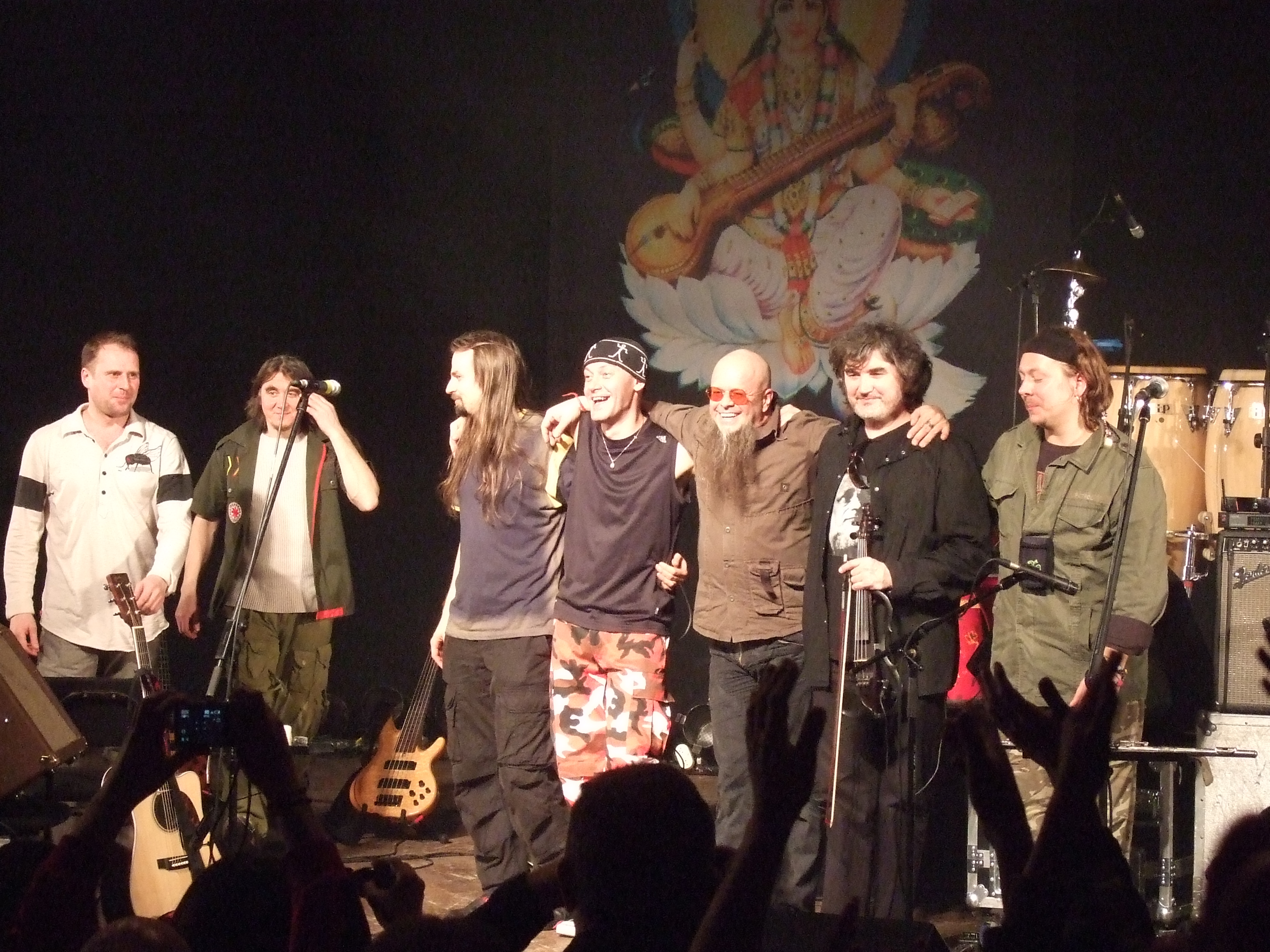
Aquarium, one of the pioneering Russian rock-bands

Rock music came to Soviet Union in the late 1960s with Beatlemania, and many rock bands arose during the late 1970s, such as Mashina Vremeni, Aquarium, and Autograph. The Russian rock was heavily built on Western European and American rock music with a strong bard music influence. Unlike VIAs, these bands were not allowed to publish their music and remained underground. Magnitizdat was the only way of distribution. The "golden age" of Russian rock is widely considered to have occurred during the 1980s, when censorship mitigated, rock clubs opened in Leningrad and Moscow, and rock festivals became legal. During the Perestroika, Russian rock became mainstream. Popular bands of this time-period included Kino, Alisa, Aria, DDT, Nautilus Pompilius, Grazhdanskaya Oborona and Gorky Park. New wave and post-punk were also trends in 1980s Russian rock.

=== Video game music ===
Since the end of the cold war and the inclusion of Russia in pop culture, Russian music has also been included in many games, the most notable being the Tetris theme.

== See also ==
=== Post-Soviet republics ===
- Music of Russia
- Music of Ukraine
- Music of Belarus
- Music of Uzbekistan
- Music of Kazakhstan
- Music of Georgia
- Music of Azerbaijan
- Music of Lithuania
- Music of Moldova
- Music of Latvia
- Music of Kyrgyzstan
- Music of Tajikistan
- Music of Armenia
- Music of Turkmenistan
- Music of Estonia

=== Other states ===
- Music of Bulgaria
- Music of Czechoslovakia
- Music of East Germany
- Music of Hungary
- Music of Poland
- Music of Romania
- Music of Cuba
- Music of Laos
- Music of North Korea
- Music of Mongolia
- Music of Vietnam
