= Alla Abdalova =

Soviet singer and actress (born 1941)

Alla Abdalova Алла Александровна Абдалова
- Born: Albina Aleksandrovna Abdalova; 19 June 1941 (age 85)
- Origin: Soviet Union
- Genres: Soviet music; pop
- Instrument: Vocals
- Spouse: Lev Leshchenko (married 1966–1976)

Albina Aleksandrovna Abdalova (Russian: Алла Александровна Абдалова; born 19 June,1941) is a Soviet singer and stage actress.

== Early life and education ==
Abdalova was born on 19 June 1941 in the Soviet Union.

She graduated from GITIS, where she was a student of Maria Maksakova Sr., Abdalova's mezzo-soprano is distinguished by a low, warm, rich timbre.

== Career ==
After an unsuccessful attempt to enter the Bolshoi Theater, she was accepted into the Operetta Theater.

For a long time, she sang in the orchestra with Leonid Utesov and worked in the Moscow Concert.

== Personal life ==
From 1966 to 1976, she was married to Lev Leshchenko. The marriage lasted 10 years, and ended in divorce, initiated by Abdalova.

After the divorce from Leshchenko, she did not get remarried, and had no children. Her quality of life rapidly declined due to loneliness and bad habits. Despite this, she refused assistance from Leshenko.

As of 2015, Abdalova retired, left her Moscow apartment, and lives with her relatives in the village.

== Songs ==
- A Song About a Friend
- Nadezhda
- The Moscow Windows
- Lilies of the Valley
- Queen of Beauty
- Snow is Falling
- Waltz from Beware of the Car
- That the Heart was so Unsettled
- On that Road
- Snowfall
- Old Maple
- As Escort Ships
- Instrumental Piece
- Black Cat
- A Song About Bears
- Our Neighbor
- Are Standing Girls
- Return of Hope
- Camomiles Hid
- When the Spring...

In 2004, a compilation was released featuring the songs of Alla Abdalova.
