= 14 Minutes Until Start =

Mass song and symbol of Soviet space missions

Song by Vladimir Troshin
- Language: Russian
- Released: 1960
- Genre: Mass song
- Composer: Oscar Feltsman
- Lyricist: Vladimir Voinovich

"14 Minutes Until Start" (Russian: Четырнадцать минут до старта, romanized: Chetyrnadtsat' minut do starta), also known as "I Believe, My Friends" (Russian: Я верю, друзья, romanized: Ya veryu, druz'ya) is a popular Soviet and Russian mass song composed in 1960 by Oscar Feltsman, to lyrics by Vladimir Voinovich. The original performer was Vladimir Troshin. The song was written as an unofficial anthem for the Soviet Space Program, and became a significant symbol of the Space Race era, being printed two times in Pravda and even being sung in space by cosmonauts Andriyan Nikolayev and Pavel Popovich during the Vostok 3 mission.

== Creation and acclaim ==
"14 Minutes Until Start" was written in autumn 1960 by Vladimir Voinovich, a relatively unknown Soviet author at the time, during his six months working as a writer for All-Union Radio. In late 1960, the Soviet government requested that a song be written to commemorate the Vostok 1 mission, which was scheduled for launch in mid-1961. In his biography Design, Voinovich claims that he was the only worker at the All-Union Radio to volunteer to write lyrics for the piece, and, with help from Oscar Feltsman, the song was completed within less than a week of the order. According to Vladimir Troshin, the song was recorded three months before the first human flight into space.

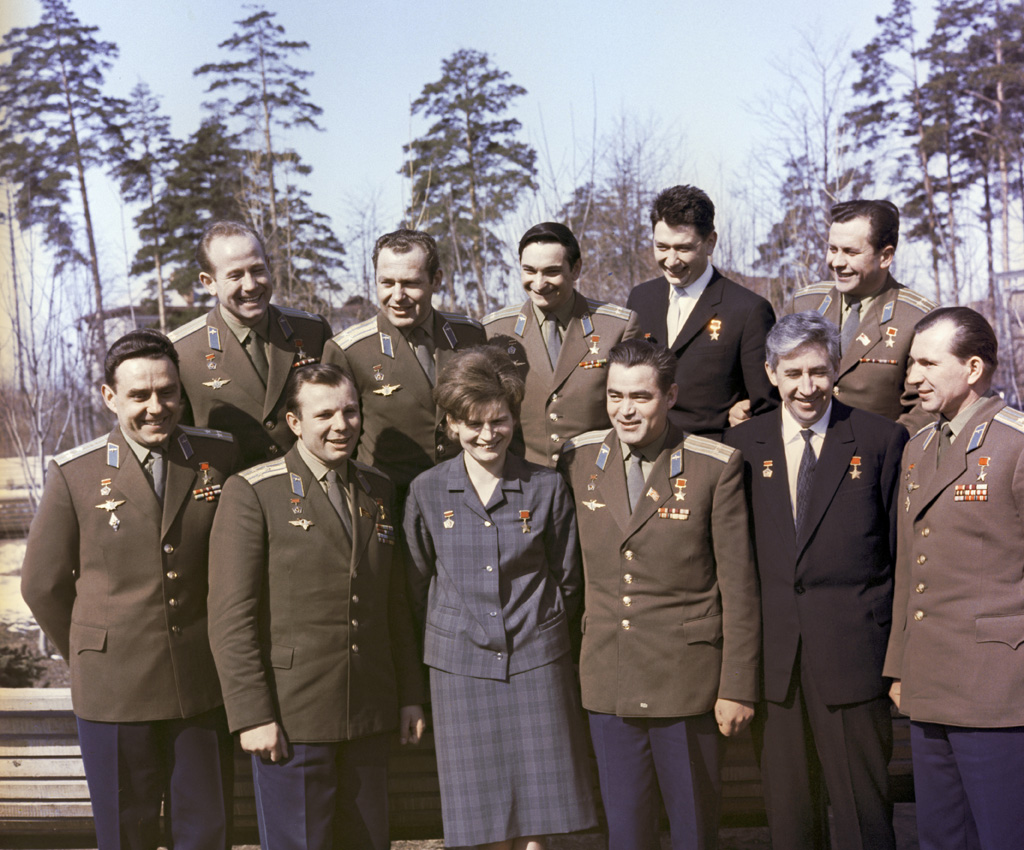
A group of prominent Soviet cosmonauts from the same era as the song, including Yuri Gagarin of Vostok 1 (front row, second from left) as well as Pavel Popovich of Vostok 4 (back row, far right) and Andriyan Nikolayev of Vostok 3 (front row, third from right)

The music video was filmed before the human's flight into space, and the TV broadcast took place immediately after. The song peaked in popularity in summer 1962, when it was sung aboard the joint Vostok 3 and 4 spaceflights by their respective cosmonauts Andriyan Nikolayev and Pavel Popovich, as well as at when the crews were received by Nikita Khrushchev after the missions. Performed by Troshin, the song is featured in the 1963 film Towards the Dream.

Subsequently, the song was performed by a large number of performers — Georg Ots, Joseph Kobzon, Yuri Vizbor etc.

== Modifications ==
Several alterations were made to the lyrics of "14 Minutes Until Start" after its release. One of the first changes was the alteration of the lyric 'blue planet' (Russian: Планета голубая, romanized: Planeta golubaya), which was altered to 'planet dear' (Russian: Планета дорогая, romanized: Planeta dorogaya) almost immediately after being submitted to the Ministry of Culture for editing. The exact reason why this lyric was changed remains unknown. Another attempted alteration to the lyrics was the term 'dusty paths' (Russian: пыльных тропинках, romanized: pyl'nykh tropinkakh), which was criticised by Soviet censors as 'deromanticising the image of space'. It was proposed that the term 'new paths' be used instead, but ultimately, Voinovich refused to change the lyric. In his biography, Voinovich defended his word choice by stating that any cosmic path would be dusty because 'there are no street cleaners in space', and that using the term 'new paths' implied that there were pre-existing old paths. The lyric 'dusty paths' was kept in the final version.

During the TV program, Pavel Popovich, while praising the song, told Oscar Feltsman that the line "let's smoke before the start" is incorrect, since cosmonauts are not allowed to smoke before the start. Years later, Voinovich responded to Popovich by saying that, as long as he did not tell him how to fly a spacecraft, Popovich had no right to tell him how to write song lyrics. In his book Not just memories, Oscar Feltsman claimed that "until today, professionals are singing "sing", cosmonauts — "smoke".

In 1974, Voinovich was expelled from the Union of Soviet Writers, and subsequently exiled from the USSR six years later. After his expulsion, the use of "14 Minutes Until Start" drastically decreased, although this decrease in broadcast coincided with a general decrease in Soviet space exploration.

== Legacy ==
The song was not widely distributed in the Soviet Union until after the success of the Vostok 1 mission, but became an almost obligatory addition to any space-related musical repertoire afterwards. It remains a moderately popular song in Russia today, and has spawned several contemporary parodies.

In 2009, the song was included in the thematic compilation "Through thorns to the stars. Songs about Space" by "Melodiya". In 2017, during a meeting with MSU students, the song was performed by Russian president Vladimir Putin.

In honor of the 60th anniversary of Yuri Gagarin's flight into space, the Moscow Police Orchestra recorded a music video. Costumes and the interior of the Soviet apartment were recreated for the shooting, as well as historical chronicle footage and iconic items from the biography of the first cosmonaut were used.

== See also ==
- Mass song
- Soviet Space Program
- Vostok 1
- Vostok 3
- Soviet music
