= Musical Instrument Factory of Riga =

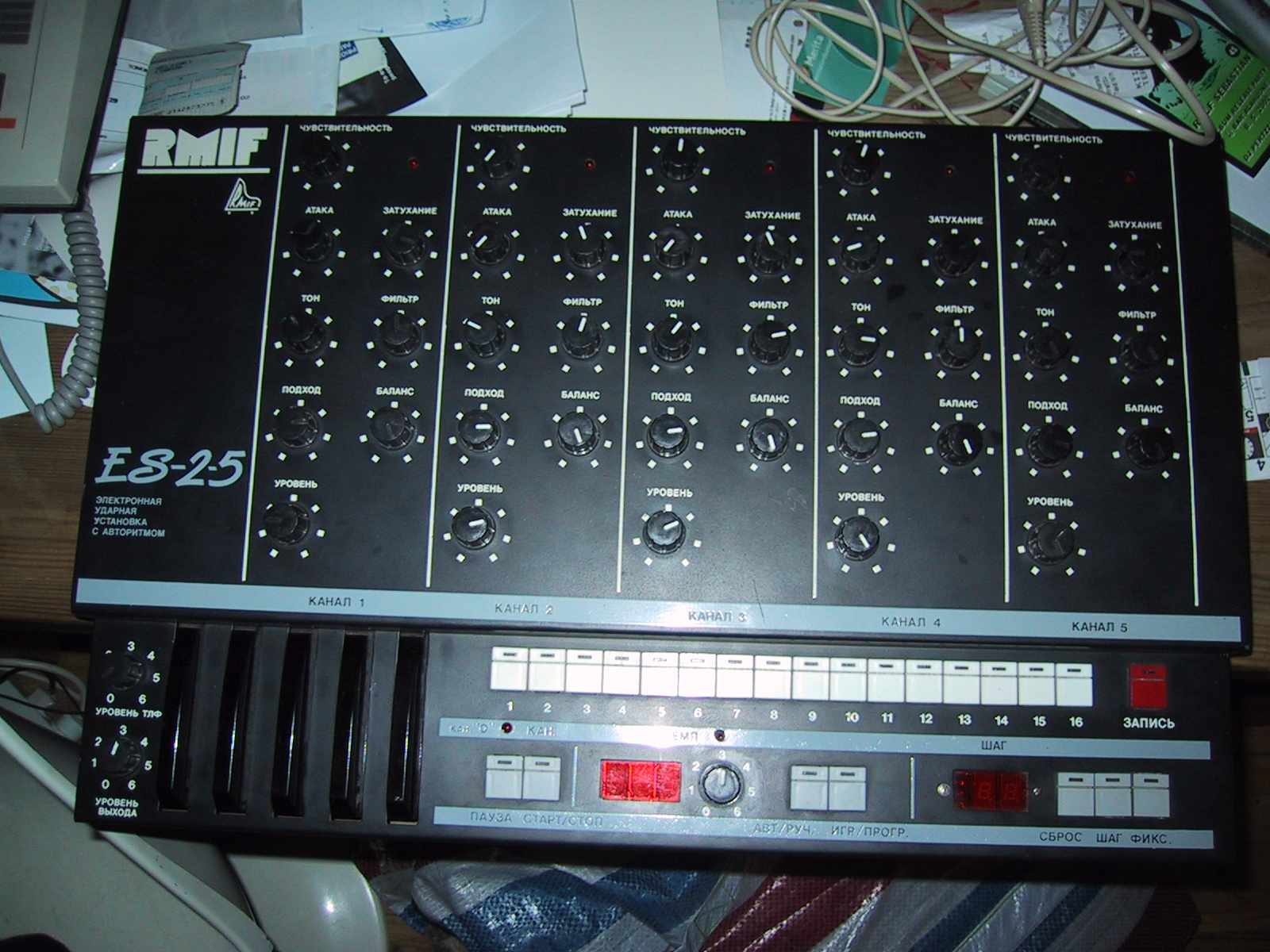
RMIF ES-2-5 analog electric percussion with auto-rhythm (1991, experimental)

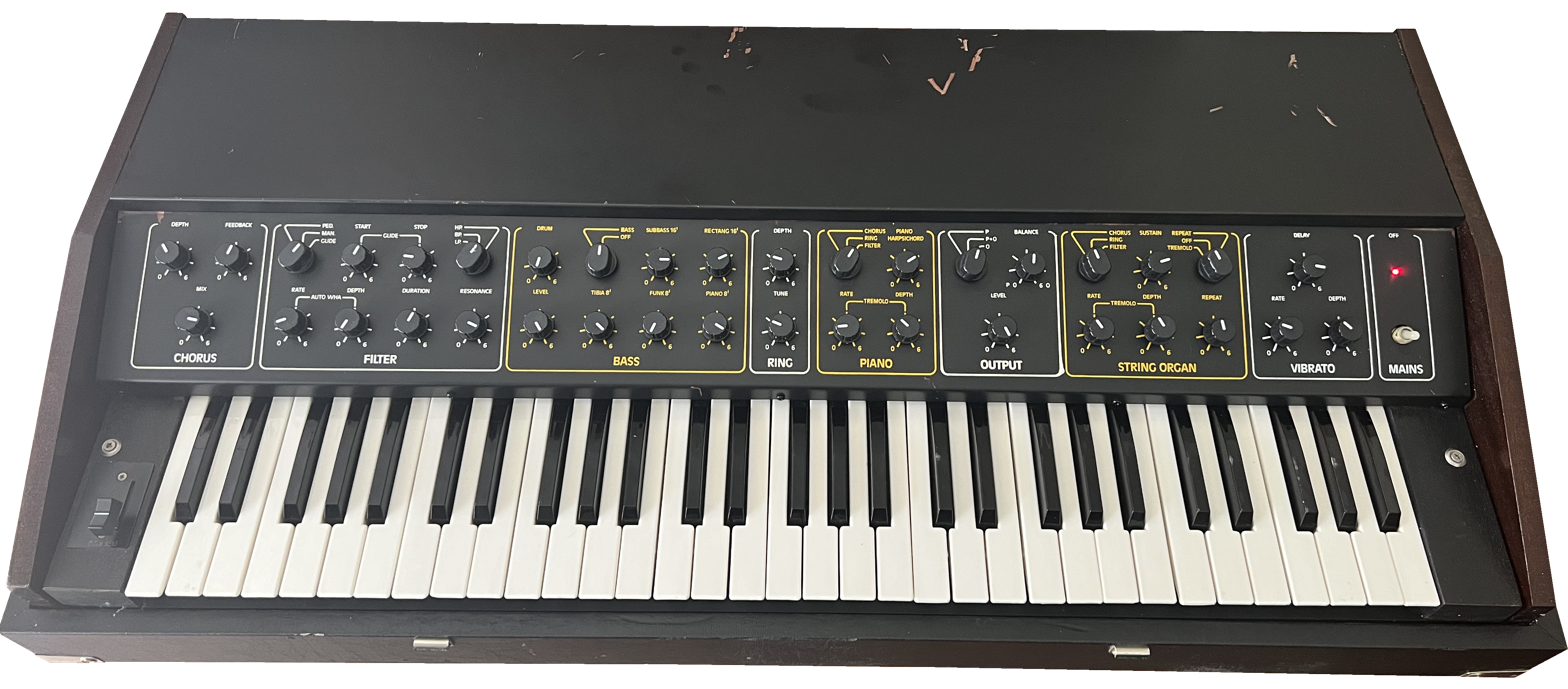
RMIF Opus analog string and piano keyboard (1988)

Musical Instrument Factory of Riga (Latvian: Rīgas mūzikas instrumentu fabrika — RMIF) was the largest Soviet electronic music instrument manufacturer. It was based in Riga (former USSR, now Latvia). RMIF synthesizers became very popular among rock and pop bands in Eastern Bloc. The plant also produced drum kits. After the dissolution of the USSR in 1991, RMIF went bankrupt.

Until 1999, about 20,000 "Rīga" pianos were produced at the Riga Musical Instrument Factory. Most of them had been realized before. In the markets of the USSR and vice versa, Latvia imported pianos from other republics of the USSR ("Belorusj", "Krasnij Oktyabrj", "Ukraina", "Moskva", "Akord", "Lira", etc.). One part of the musical instruments was eliminated in the course of operation.

== Products ==
=== Electronic organ ===
- RMIF Perle - Electronic organ with eleven tone stops and three effects
- RMIF Miki

=== Polyphonic synthesizers ===
- Opus - ensemble synthesizer consists of four sections: Piano, String, Organ, and Bass
- RMIF TI-3 - polyphonic programmable synthesizer with built-in sequencer and arpeggiator
- RMIF TI-5 - polyphonic programmable synthesizer, similar to Amfiton M-028

=== Electronic drums ===
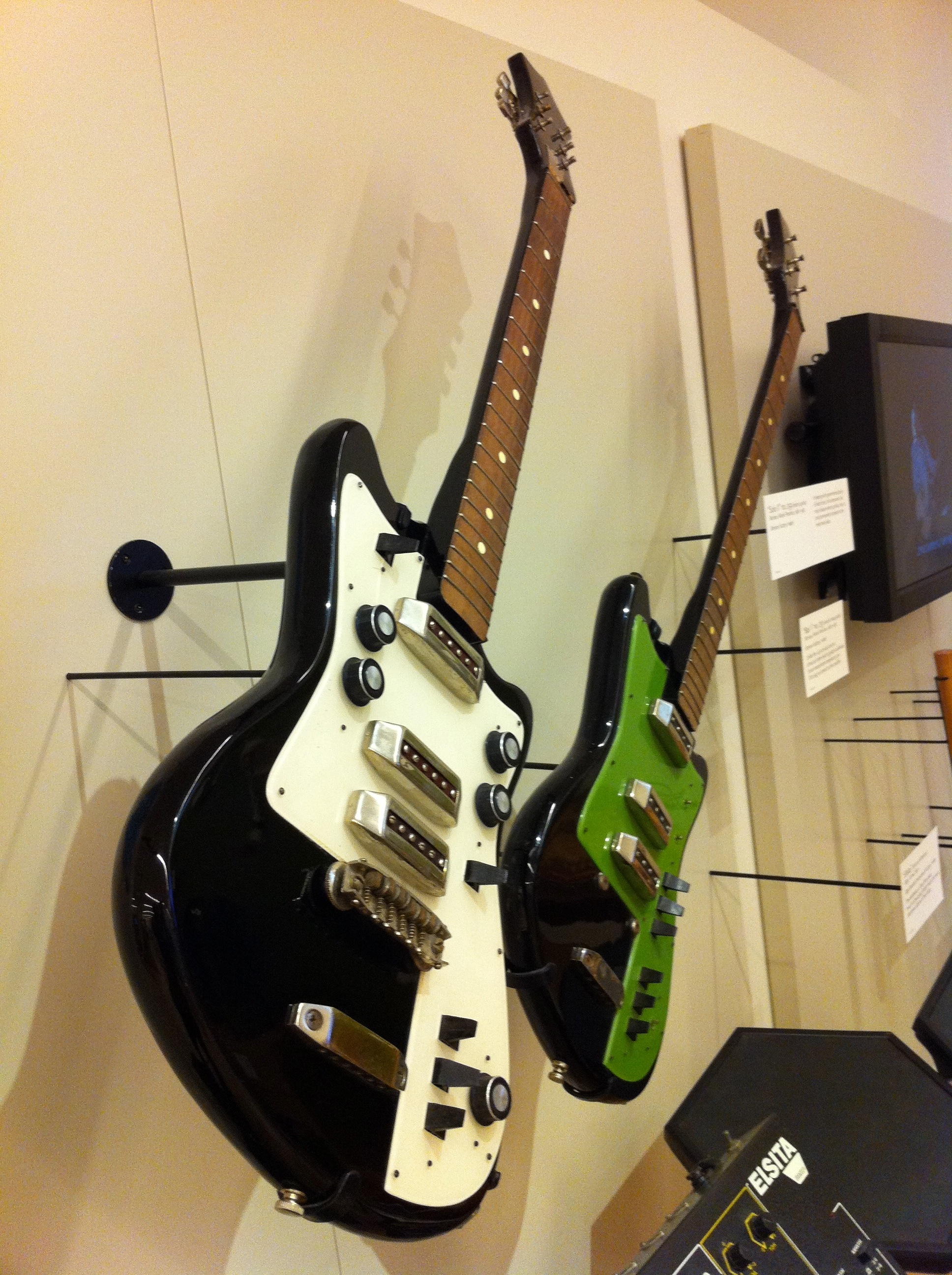
RMIF ELSITA electronic drum (bottom right)

- RMIF Elsita (ca. 1989) - analog drum modules
- RMIF ES-2-5 (1991, experimental) - analog electronic percussion with auto-rhythm

== See also ==
- ANS synthesizer
- Polivoks
- Theremin
- Variophone

== External resources ==
- "Latvia - RIGA - Musical Instruments Factory - VF -D49307" (picture), delcampe.net
- RMIF Miki (picture)
