= SunVox =

Music tracker and modular synthesizer developed by Alexander "NightRadio" Zolotov

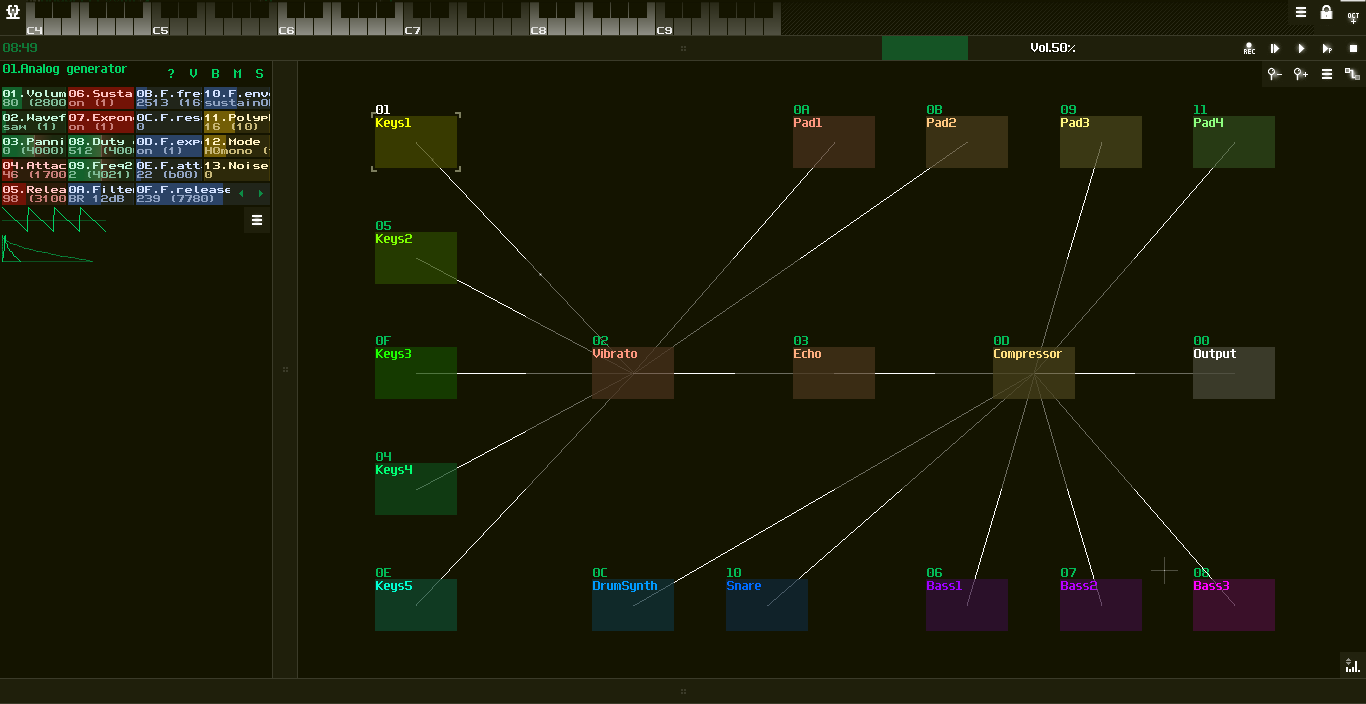
- Screenshot of SunVox
- Developers: Alexander Zolotov (aka 'NightRadio')
- Release: April 5, 2008; 18 years ago
- Stable release: 2.1.2 / October 15, 2024; 23 months ago
- Written in: C++
- Operating system: Windows, Windows CE, MacOS, iOS, Linux, Android, Palm OS
- Size: ~828 KB (different by architecture)
- Available in: English, Russian
- License: SunVox Modular Music Creation Studio (Proprietary), SunVox Engine (BSD 3-Clause)
- Website: warmplace.ru/soft/sunvox/

SunVox, also known as SunVox Modular Music Creation Studio, is a 2008 music creation tool built around the SunVox Engine, a software-based modular synthesizer and tracker-based sequencer. Developed by a Russian developer Alexander "NightRadio" Zolotov, it is available for multiple platforms including Windows, MacOS and Linux on desktop computers and iOS and Android on mobile devices. The desktop versions are freely available for download on the developer's website while a paid version for iOS and Android is purchasable from those platforms' official app stores (the Apple App Store and Google Play, respectively). There was also, at one time, a release for Palm OS devices.

The underlying SunVox engine was developed as free software under the BSD License prior to version 1.4.

== Features ==
SunVox can be broken down into four main sections as shown:

=== Module View ===
Module view is where your instruments and effects are located; every unit of instruments and effects is represented as a rectangle called modules. These modules not only are used for generating or modifying sounds, but also give visual feedback by displaying various type of oscillation signals. Modules have three main type, which they are:

==== Synths ====
These are the oscillators of SunVox, acting as your sound source, including subtractive, FM, samples, drum, and a FFT (Fast Fourier Transform) based additive synthesizer.

==== Effects ====
SunVox also includes a handful of effects to modify the sound from your synth module, from basic module like filter, delay, echo and reverb, to something more complex like FFT, and pitch shifter.

==== Misc ====
Modules that do not fit into the two categories above are located in misc. They are generally used for modifying control or MIDI signal, such as MultiCtl (controller multiple controller at different module), MultiSynth (sending MIDI signal to multiple synths), Sound2Ctl (converting audio signal into control signal for controllers), and feedback (the only way for doing feedback loop in SunVox). MetaModule is notable in this category because this loads another SunVox project within the current project as a module, which is useful for loading multiple SunVox projects at once, or designing customized synth and effect modules.

=== Controller View ===
Located at the left side of the screen, the controller view list all the controls for the selected module at the module view; users can manipulate the controller to change the sound of a module, and one can also assign automation into a pattern by shift-clicking a controller. The controller also have options for mute, solo or bypass the module, to ignore some of the sound during sound design. If the controller list is too long, the V option can display the controller in one, two or four columns, reducing the length of controller for complex MetaModule or FMX.

=== Pattern Editor ===
This is where the notes are sequenced, displaying pattern data of a chosen pattern at the pattern timeline. Every patterns can support up to 32 tracks in any length. Compared with other trackers software, SunVox tracker command is based on a 16 bit numbers rather than 8 bit in other common tracker software, providing finer controls to the modules, and handling note effect and automation separately.

=== Pattern Timeline ===
Unlike other trackers which use a fixed length pattern slot system, the length and location of patterns in SunVox are dynamic, so patterns can be played at any time, providing a flexible timing for any instruments. Instead of using numerical ID for pattern, SunVox uses a 16x16, user editable bi-color icon (background and foreground color). Each pattern can have its own name, to provide more details.

In the 2.0.0 update, SunVox also features "super track" mode, which it can be used for toggle solo or mute a single row of pattern by enabling / disabling the MIDI signal, to focus on certain instruments. This mode also have a feature for keeping any playing notes even the pattern ends.

== Commentary ==
The website TapeOp.com said of the program's interface: "There are a lot of things about the interface that will probably be counter-intuitive to someone coming from a more conventional DAW environment, but if you've ever used and enjoyed a tracker you will feel right at home, and if you haven't you will find that once you're familiar with some tracker sequencing conventions, SunVox has a very efficient work flow with a good balance between depth and usability."

SunVox has also been noted by some as a viable music production tool for Android devices. Online music technology magazine CDM opined in a 2020 article: "Android would be almost a useless platform for music, except that Android runs SunVox perfectly and then you don’t need any other apps. That’s six bucks well spent. And it’s on iOS, too. And free [sic] on macOS, Windows, Linux, and… you’ve got some old Windows CE device? Don’t create toxic waste. Run SunVox."

== SunVox Compo ==
Hosted by the developer of SunVox in October 2014, this annual event required SunVox users to submit an entry within 64kB size limit, but as of February 2024, the annual event required SunVox users to submit an entry by 4MB size limit; the entries can be in any genres and any style. During the competition, all the entries are displayed with a visualizer written in Pixilang, a pixel-oriented programming language. The tracks with the three highest votes, only if the packed file does not exceed 256kB, will be the winner of the year and they will be included as a demo track in the distribution of SunVox.

== Version History ==
Version	Release date	Comments (from changelog)
1.9.6c	15 Dec 2020	bug fixes
1.9.6b	25 Nov 2020	bug fixes
1.9.6	24 Nov 2020	
1.9.5d	20 Feb 2020	bug fixes
1.9.5c	24 Nov 2020	bug fixes
1.9.5b	24 Nov 2020	iOS (AU): missing files added.
1.9.5	24 Nov 2020	
1.9.1 beta	30 Dec 2015	
1.7.4	23 Jan 2014	
1.7.3b	27 Apr 2013	
1.7	11 Jan 2012	Releases include Android app
1.6.4	23 Aug 2011	
1.6	10 Dec 2010	
1.5.1	3 Apr 2010	
1.4	25 Jul 2009	
1.1	25 Oct 2008	
1.0b	8 Apr 2008	Early Patch
1.0	5 Apr 2008	Initial release
Legend: Unsupported Supported Latest version

== See also ==
- Virtual ANS – ANS-simulating software synthesizer by the same developer
