= Victory Day (song) =

Russian song

"Victory Day" (Russian: День Победы, romanized: Den' Pobedy) ranks among the most popular in the large corpus of Russian songs devoted to World War II. The song refers to the Victory Day celebration and differs from most of these by its cheerful intonations of a marching song and by the fact that it was composed by David Tukhmanov thirty years after the war. In the words of Vladimir Kharitonov, a veteran lyricist, "the song seemed to have turned back the time. Although written three decades after the war, it now seems that it was this song that helped us to gain the victory".

== History ==
In order to commemorate the 30th anniversary of the Soviet victory in the Second World War, the Soviet government announced a competition for the best song about the war. In March 1975, poet Vladimir Kharitonov, who had taken part in the war approached his traditional co-author, the young composer David Tukhmanov with a proposal to write a new song for the occasion. This effort was to differ strikingly from their previous collaborations, which had been disco-influenced chartbusters. Several days before the deadline, Kharitonov brought his lyric to Tukhmanov and the latter composed a song just in time to be recorded track of an orchestra. His wife Tatyana Sashko, a singer and the song's lyricist, sang Den Pobedy before the jury.

However, the jury, composed primarily of elderly songwriters whose tastes had been formed during Stalin's era, was exceedingly displeased with the result. The lyrics appeared to them lightsome and frivolous, while the melody was alleged to abuse the "rhythms of tango and foxtrot", two "bourgeois" dances which had been banned in the Soviet Union.

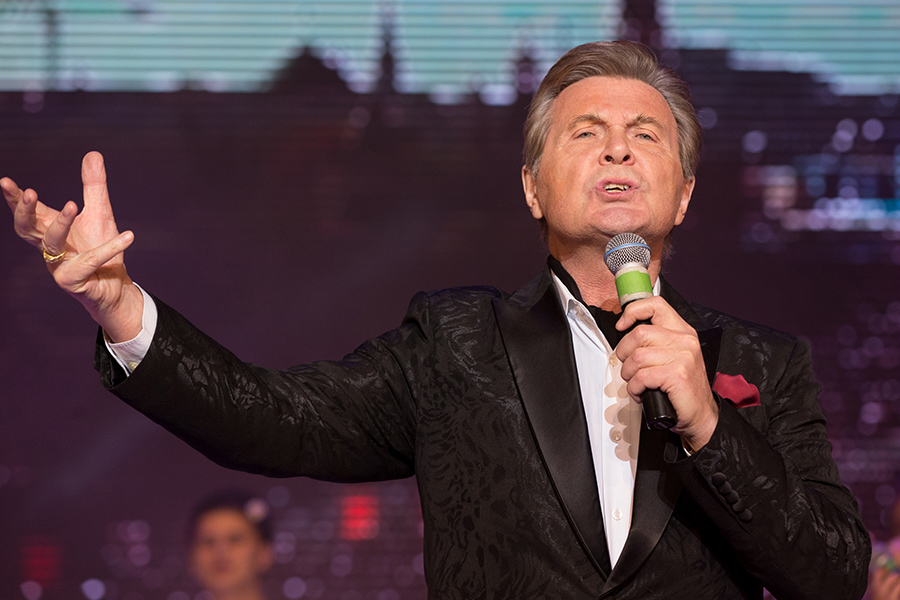
Lev Leschenko performing "Den Pobedy" in 2016

Although the performance of the song was strongly discouraged, Lev Leshchenko, one of the most popular Soviet singers, dared to premiere it during his concert in Alma-Ata in late April. Then the song was performed in the Little Blue Light TV show on 9 May by another singer, Leonid Smetannikov, but his interpretation was rather lackluster and failed to attract attention. Thereupon the song was not performed until 10 November when Leshchenko revived it for a grand concert, which was broadcast live on Soviet television and that took place in the Kremlin Palace of Congresses on Militsiya Day. His performance astounded the censors but proved to be a runaway success with the audience, who clamored for an encore.

Since then, the song has been invariably performed during every Victory Day celebrations in the Soviet Union and Russia, often concluding a program of festivities, with the last stanza drowned in sounds of fireworks over the Red Square. According to Komsomolskaya Pravda, the Soviet leader Leonid Brezhnev liked this song greatly, especially when performed by Joseph Kobzon, and predicted to Kharitonov that "folks would sing this tune for many years after you and I are gone".

Brezhnev's expectation did not fail to materialize, in part because, as the US-American researcher David MacFadyen explains, "this powerful song draws not upon the bravery of youthful soldiers but the private memories of ageing, greying veterans. Its poignant combination of joy at a stunning victory and sadness at great loss sounds just as relevant today, when the war itself is something about which many young Russians neither know nor care".

In a survey conducted in 2015, the lyrics of Victory Day placed fifth on a list of the most popular poetry lines in Russia.

== Lyrics ==
=== Russian lyrics ===
День Победы, как он был от нас далёк,
Как в костре потухшем таял уголёк.
Были вёрсты, обгорелые, в пыли —
Этот день мы приближали как могли.

Chorus:

Этот День Победы
Порохом пропах,
Это праздник
С сединою на висках.
Это радость
Со слезами на глазах.

День Победы!

День Победы!

День Победы!

Дни и ночи у мартеновских печей
Не смыкала наша Родина очей.
Дни и ночи битву трудную вели —
Этот день мы приближали как могли.

Chorus

Здравствуй, мама, возвратились мы не все...
Босиком бы пробежаться по росе!
Пол-Европы прошагали, пол-Земли —
Этот день мы приближали как могли.

Chorus x 2

=== Romanization ===
Den' Pobedy, kak on byl ot nas dalyok,
Kak v kostre potukhshem tayal ugolyok.
Byli vyorsty, obgorelye, v pyli —
Etot den' my priblizhali kak mogli.

Chorus:

Etot Den' Pobedy
Porokhom propakh,
Eto prazdnik,
S sedinoyu na viskakh.
Eto radost'
So slezami na glazakh.

Den' Pobedy!

Den' Pobedy!

Den' Pobedy!

Dni i nochi u martenovskikh pechey,
Ne smykala nasha Rodina ochey.
Dni i nochi bitvu trudnuyu veli, —
Etot den' my priblizhali kak mogli.

Chorus

Zdravstvuy, mama, vozvratilis' my ne vse,
Bosikom by probezhat'sya po rose!
Pol-Yevropy proshagali, pol-Zemli —
Etot den' my priblizhali kak mogli.

Chorus x 2

=== Translation ===
Victory Day, oh how far from us it was,
Like a dwindling ember in a faded fire.
There were miles ahead, they were dusty, they were burned.
We hastened this day as best we could.

Chorus:

This Victory Day
Is saturated with gunpowder,
It's a celebration
With temples already gray,
It's joy
With tears upon our eyes

Victory Day!

Victory Day!

Victory Day!

Days and nights at hearth furnaces,
Our Motherland didn't sleep a wink.
Days and nights a hard battle we fought—
We hastened this day as best we could.

Chorus

Hello, Mother, not all of us came back...
How I'd like to run barefoot through the dew!
Half of Europe, we have stridden half the Earth,
We hastened this day as best we could!
Chorus x 2

== Charts ==
2025 chart performance for "Den' Pobedy" (Lev Leshchenko version)
| Chart (2025) | Peak position |
|---|---|
| Russia Streaming (TopHit) | 80 |

2026 chart performance for "Den' Pobedy" (Lev Leshchenko version)
| Chart (2026) | Peak position |
|---|---|
| Russia Streaming (TopHit) | 54 |
