= Lev Leshchenko =

Russian singer (born 1942)

- Лев Лещенко
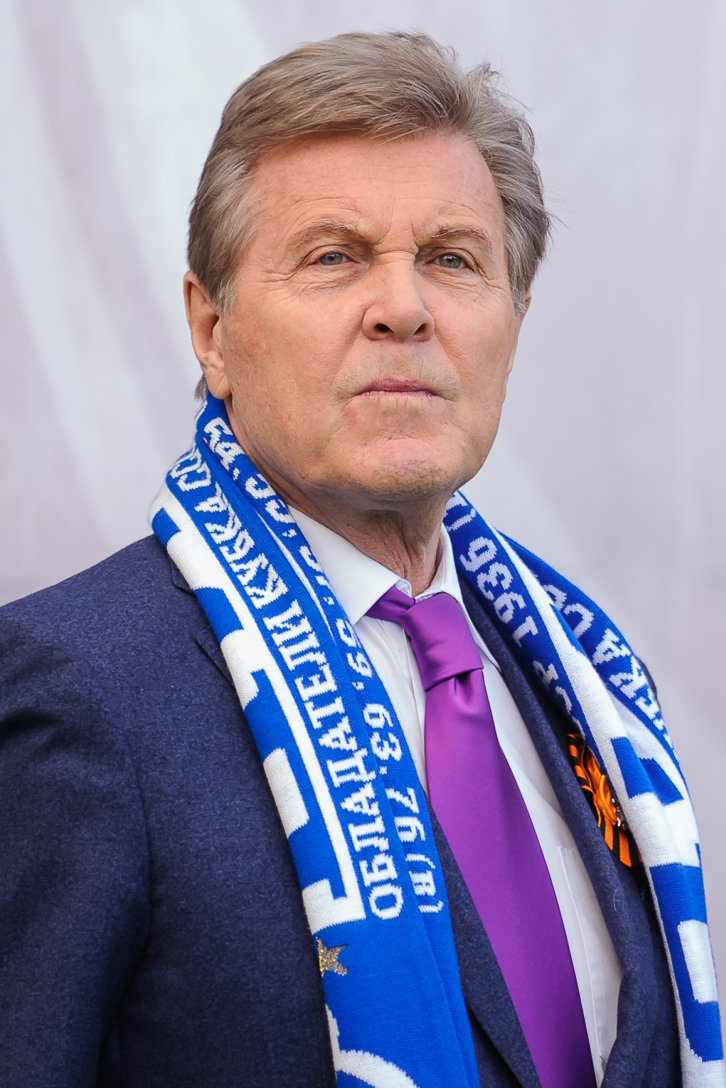
- Leshchenko in 2019
- Born: Lev Valerianovich Leshchenko; 1 February 1942 (age 84); Moscow, Russian SFSR, Soviet Union
- Education: Russian Academy of Theatre Arts
- Occupation: Singer
- Title: People's Artist of the RSFSR (1983)
- Awards: Full cavalier of the Order "For Merit to the Fatherland" (Russia); Order of Friendship of Peoples (USSR); Order of the Badge of Honour (USSR); Order of Friendship (Kazakhstan); Sopot International Song Festival (Winner,1972)
- Musical career
- Genres: Soviet music, operatic pop, pop, Soviet estrada
- Years active: 1959–present
- Website: levleschenko.ru

"Prityazhen'ye Zemli"
Sample of "Prityazhen'ye Zemli" by Lev Leshchenko (1980)

Lev Valerianovich Leshchenko (Russian: Лев Валерьянович Лещенко; born 1 February 1942) is a Russian singer, who is best known for his rendition of "Den Pobedy" and the 1980 Summer Olympics closing ceremony theme song "Do svidanya, Moskva".

== Biography ==
Lev Leshchenko was born on 1 February 1942 in Moscow, Soviet Union. His father, Valerian Andreyevich Leshchenko (1904–2004), was a Red Army officer who was at war outside of Moscow. His grandfather was from the village of Nizy in the Kharkov province, which at that time was part of the Russian Empire. In 1900, he moved to the Kursk province, where he got a job as an accountant at a factory. Grandfather Leshchenko was a musical person: he sang in the church choir, played many instruments. Lev Valeryanovich's father moved to Moscow in 1931. Having gone through the Winter War, and then the Great Patriotic War, he rose to the rank of lieutenant colonel and was awarded many orders. He was awarded medals for his participation in the Second World War. His mother, Klavdiya Petrovna Leshchenko (née Fedoseyeva; 1915–1943), died shortly after Lev was born, so he was raised by his stepmother Marina Mikhailovna. His grandparents, along with his stepmother Irina Pavlovna Leshchenko, whom his father married in 1948, brought Leshchenko up in Sokolniki, Moscow. During his childhood, he was introduced to classical music and theatre, and began performing songs by Leonid Utyosov.

Between 1959 and 1960, Leshchenko worked as a stagehand at the State Academic Bolshoi Theatre, and before being conscripted into the army in 1961, he worked as an adjuster at a precision measuring instrument factory. Leschenko served in the mechanical vehicle division of the Soviet Army, positioned in the German Democratic Republic. On 27 January 1962, Leshchenko (then a private) became a soloist within the Soviet Red Army Ensemble, and received an offer to remain in the army. Leshchenko accepted every role offered to him by the ensemble, from singing in a quarter, conducting concerts and even reading verses, where it is said his entertainment career began. At the same time, he was preparing for the theatrical examinations of the Russian Academy of Theatre Arts (abbreviated as GITIS), the most respected theatrical school of the Soviet Union, which he passed and was successfully admitted to in September 1964.

Leshchenko began touring with concert bands, visiting some of the more isolated parts of the country. In 1969, Leshchenko was admitted as a member of the Moscow Operetta Theatre. He took up many minor musical roles, but was aware of his musical gift and was constantly looking for soloist acts. On 13 February 1970, having won a contest held by the state radio station, Leshchenko became a solo vocalist for the Soviet state radio station.

In 1975, Leshchenko performed "Den Pobedy", an immensely popular Soviet song dedicated to Victory Day, which was initially disliked by the authorities due to its unconventional music style. His rendition has become by far the most well known. In 1999 Leshchenko was given a star on the Star Square in Moscow.

In March 2014 he signed a letter in support of the position of the President of Russia Vladimir Putin on the Russian annexation of Crimea. For this he was banned from entering Ukraine. Crimea has been under dispute by Russia and Ukraine since March 2014.

== Popular Songs ==
- "Solovyinaya roshcha" ("Соловьиная роща") – "Nightingale Grove"
- "Proshay" ("Прощай") – "Good Bye"
- "Prityazhen'ye Zemli" ("Притяжение Земли") – "Gravity of the Earth"
- "Den Pobedy" (День победы) – "The Day of the Victory"
- "Ni Minuty Pokoja" (Ни минуты покоя) – "Not a Minute's Peace"
- "Rodnaya zemlya" ("Родная Земля") – "Native Land"
- "Roditelskiy dom" ("Родительский дом") – "The Parental Home"
- "Ne plach' devchonka" ("Не плачь, девчонка") – "Don't Cry, Girl"
- "Ty moya Moskva" ("Ты моя Москва") - You are my Moscow

== Personal life ==
From 1966 to 1976, he was married to Alla Abdalova. The marriage lasted 10 years, and ended in divorce, initiated by Abdalova. Since 1978, he has been married to Irina Bagudina (born 15 May 1954).

Leshchenko is a member of the United Russia party.

== Honours and awards ==
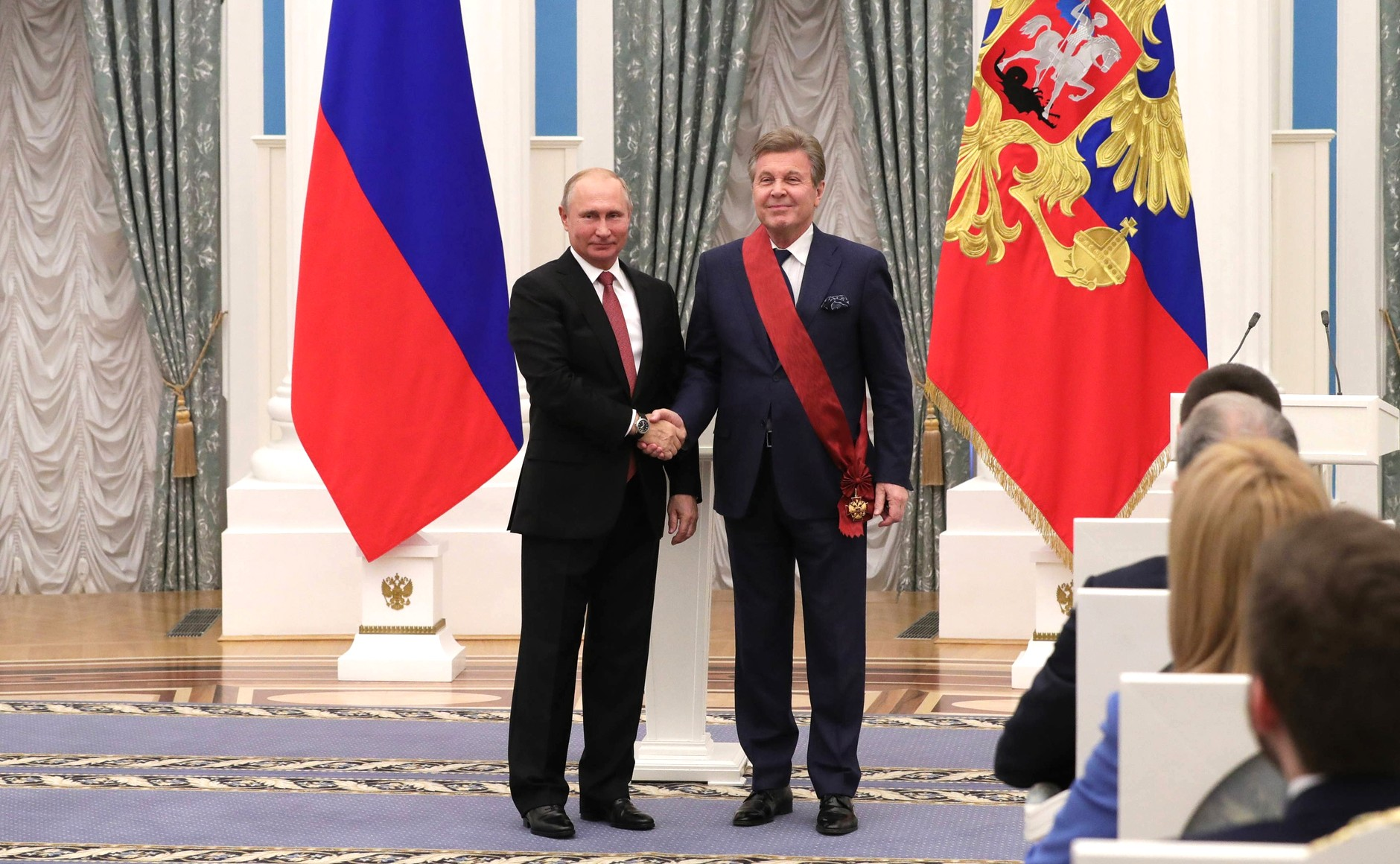
President Vladimir Putin awards the 1st Degree Order of Merit for the Fatherland to Leshchenko, 27 November 2018

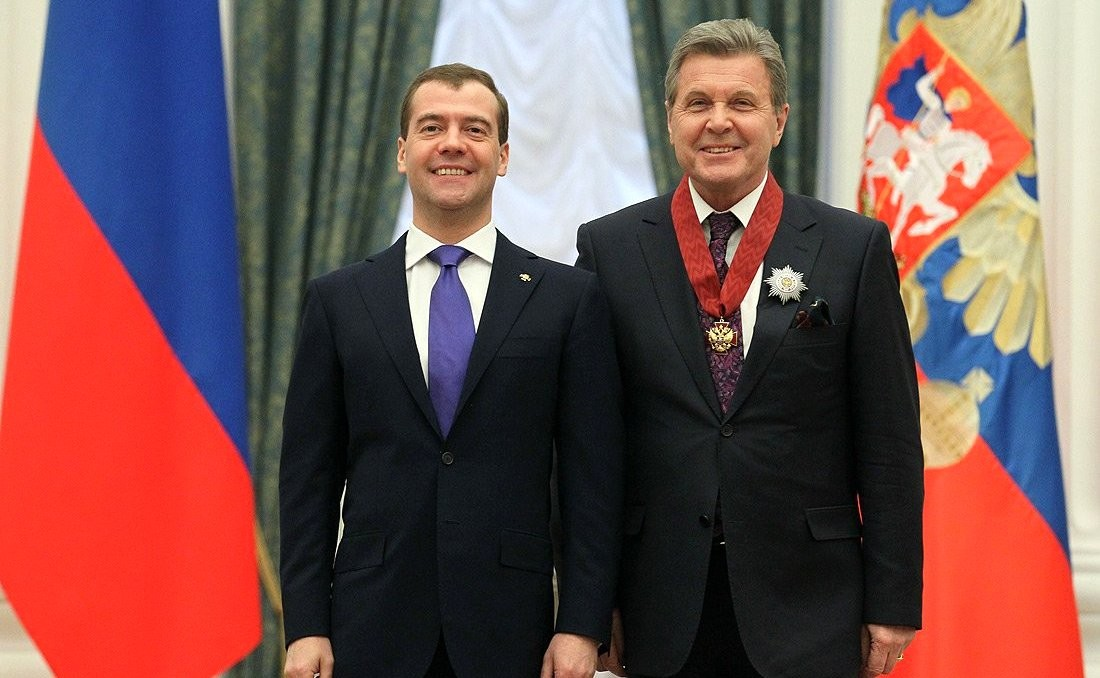
President Dmitry Medvedev awards the 2nd Degree Order of Merit for the Fatherland to Leshchenko, 22 February 2012

President Vladimir Putin awards the 3rd Degree Order of Merit for the Fatherland to Leshchenko, 22 February 2007

Orders

- Order "For Merit to the Fatherland" 1st class (24 October 2017)
- Order "For Merit to the Fatherland" 2nd class (30 January 2012)
- Order "For Merit to the Fatherland" 3rd class (1 February 2007)
- Order "For Merit to the Fatherland" 4th class (31 January 2002)
- Order of Friendship of Peoples (14 November 1980)
- Order of the Badge of Honour (17 August 1989)
- Order of Friendship (Kazakhstan)

Titles

- People's Artist of the RSFSR (1983)
- Honoured Artist of the RSFSR (1977)
- Honoured Artist of the Transnistria (2015)
- People's Artist of the South Ossetia (2010)
- People's Artist of the North Ossetia-Alania (2015)
- Honorary Citizen of Kursk Oblast (2012)

With Russian First Lady Svetlana Medvedeva, 26 April 2012

Awards

- Lenin Komsomol Prize (1978)
- Belarus president award Through Art - to Peace and Understanding (2012)
