= Mass song =

Soviet music genre

"Enthusiast's March" is a mass song of the Soviet Union that was first performed in the film "Светлый путь" (Shining Path) in 1940

Mass song (Russian: массовая песня Massovaya pesnya) was a genre of Soviet music that was widespread in the Soviet Union. A mass song was written by a professional or amateur composer for individual or chorus singing and intended for "broad masses" of Soviet people.

The Soviet mass song is representative of the school of Socialist realism in art and an important part of Soviet propaganda. The Soviet Music Encyclopedia says that they were "a powerful means of organization and education of the masses".

According to the Soviet Music Encyclopedia, during 1920–1950s the term was applied to most of the songs written by Soviet composers. However, with the establishment of the term "Soviet song," the term "mass song" was restricted to the genre of chorus songs without accompaniment and with lyrics based on social-political themes, typically performed during various Soviet gatherings such as rallies, demonstrations, and meetings. Some songs of other Soviet song genres, "stage song" (estradnaya pesnya) and "everyday song" (bytovaya pesnya), could also be considered mass songs depending on their social importance.

The concept of "mass song" was put forth by members of the union of young composers Prokoll (Production Collective of the Students at the Moscow Conservatory).

== Characteristics ==
Musical characteristics of a mass song ensured easy comprehension and performance by non-professional "masses". A mass song is typically an alternating sequence of four-line stanzas and refrains in a non-sophisticated musical form which employed most common vocal register. Typically these songs are of optimistic or heroic character, written in the form of a march.

A significant number of mass songs were film soundtracks and later on TV movie soundtracks, sports songs and patriotic marches written for important anniversaries.

== Notable mass songs ==
- 14 Minutes Until Start

== See also ==
- Soviet propaganda music during the Cold War
- Revolutionary song
