= Vladimir Troshin =

Soviet and Russian singer and actor (1926–2008)

- Born: Vladimir Konstantinovich Troshin; 15 May 1926; Mikhaylovsk, Sverdlovsk Oblast, Russian SFSR, Soviet Union
- Died: 25 February 2008; Moscow, Russian Federation
- Occupations: Actor, singer

Vladimir Konstantinovich Troshin (Russian: Влади́мир Константи́нович Тр́ошин; 15 May 1926 – 25 February 2008) was a Soviet and Russian film and theater actor and singer.

In 1951, at the age of 25, for his portrayal of a rural inventor in the play Second Love at the Moscow Art Theater, he was awarded the Stalin Prize (2nd degree). Troshin was the original performer of the song "Moscow Nights" that in 1957 brought him fame all over the Soviet Union.

Troshin was made a People's Artist of the RSFSR in 1985. He also was made a Merited Artist of the Mari El. He was awarded the Order of Honour and Order of Friendship.

== Selected songs ==
- 14 Minutes Until Start
- Behind the Factory Outpost
- Moscow Nights
- Roads
- The Volga River Flows
- Zemlyanka

== Partial discography ==
- 1973 — Vladimir Troshin (LP, «Melodiya» Д 035117-18)
- 1979 — Pesni iz kinofil'mov (LP, «Melodiya» С60 12823-4)
- 2002 — Luchshiye pesni raznykh let (CD, «Zvezdy kotoriye ne gasnyt» series)
- 2006 — Zolotaya kollektsiya retro (2CD, «Bomba Music» BoMB 033—219/220)

== Partial filmography ==
- Oni byli pervymi (1956) - Epizod (uncredited)
- It Happened in Penkovo (1958)
- Na grafskikh razvalinakh (1958)
- Oleko Dundich (1958) - Voroshilov
- Den pervyy (1958)
- Chelovek s planety Zemlya (1959)
- Zolotoy eshelon (1959) - Smotritel khranilishcha tsennostey
- Hussar Ballad (1962) - Guerilla
- Bolshie i malenkie (1963)
- The Big Ore (1964) - Driver
- Tatyanin den (1968) - Samsonov's Friend
- The Little Mermaid (1968, Short) - (voice)
- Krakh (1969) - Churchill
- Vizit v Kovalyovku (1980)
- The Old New Year (1981)
- Battle of Moscow (1985) - Kliment Yefremovich Voroshilov
- Poshchyochina, kotoroy ne bylo (1987)
- How Dark the Nights Are on the Black Sea (1989) - Actor
- Iz zhizni Fyodora Kuzkina (1989)
- Stalingrad (1990) - Kliment Voroshilov
- Entrance to the Labyrinth (1990, TV Mini-Series)
- How Dark the Nights Are on the Black Sea (1990)
- Wolfhound (1991)
- Volkodav (1992)
- The Russian Singer (1993) - General Vlasov
- Serye volki (1993) - N.V. Podgornyj
- Dolgoe proshchanie (2004) - Actor (final film role)
