= Yevgeny Murzin =

Russian audio engineer and inventor (1914–1970)

Yevgeny Alexandrovich Murzin
- Евгений Александрович Мурзин
- Born: October 25 (November 7), 1914; Samara, Russian Empire
- Died: February 27, 1970; Moscow, USSR

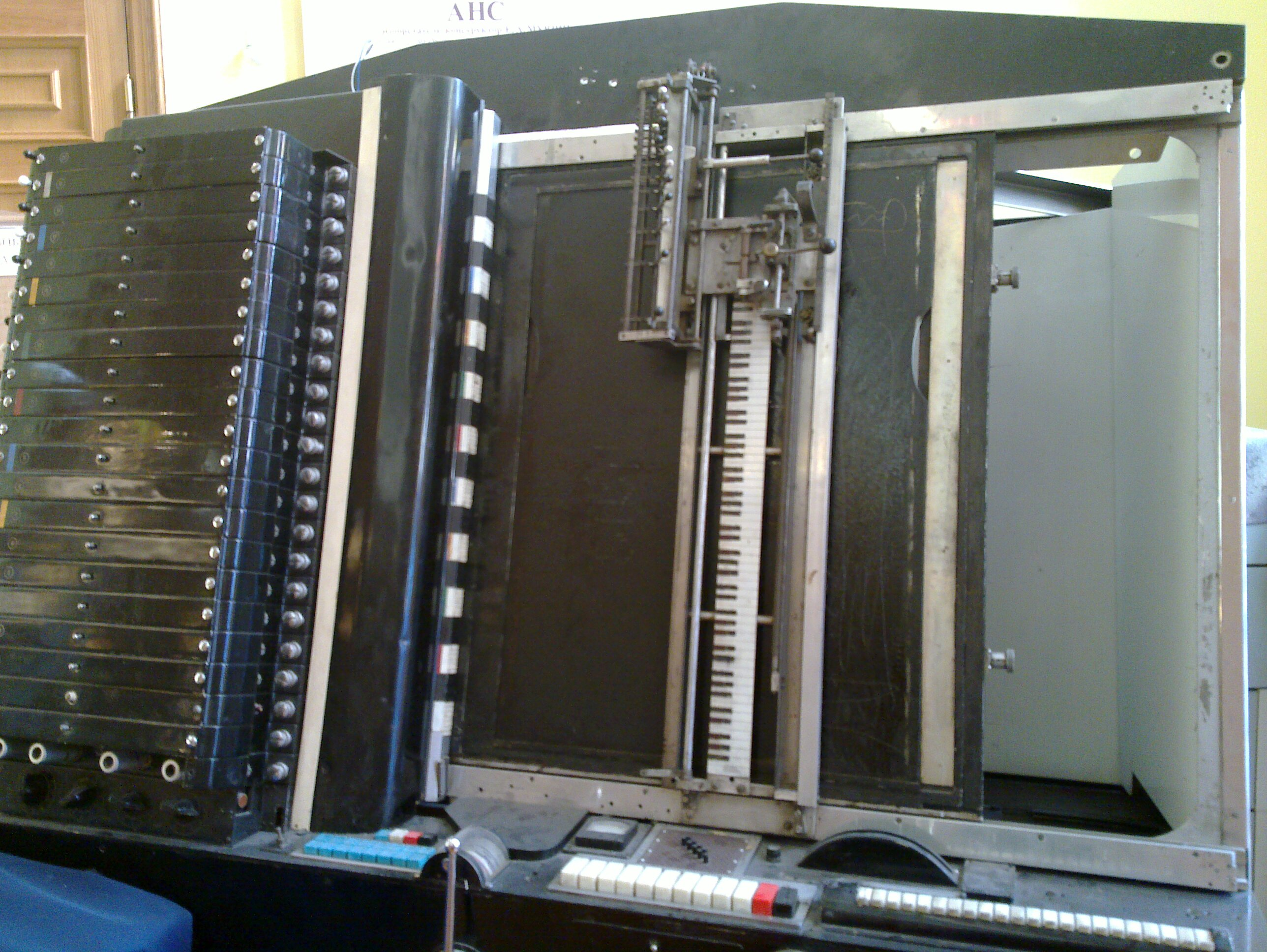
The ANS exhibited at Glinka Museum (May, 2013)

Yevgeny Alexandrovich Murzin (Russian: Евгений Мурзин; 1914–1970) was a Russian audio engineer and inventor of the ANS synthesizer.

== Academic life and military service ==
Murzin began his academic life studying municipal building at the Moscow Institute of Engineers. When Nazi Germany invaded the USSR in 1941, he joined the soviet Artillery Academy as a Senior Technical Lieutenant. During his time in military service, Murzin was responsible for developing an electro-mechanical anti-aircraft detector which was later adopted by the Soviet Army. After the war, Murzin joined the Moscow Higher Technical School where he completed a thesis on Thematics and was involved in the development of military equipment including an artillery sound ranging device, instruments for the guidance of fighters to enemy bombers and air-raid defence systems.

== Murzin's synthesizer ==
In 1938, invented a design for composers based on synthesizing complex musical sounds from a limited number of pure tones; this proposed system was to perform music without musicians or musical instruments. The technological basis of his invention was the method of photo-optic sound recording used in cinematography, which made it possible to obtain a visible image of a sound wave, as well as to realize the opposite goal—synthesizing a sound from an artificially drawn sound wave.

Despite the apparent simplicity of his idea of reconstructing a sound from its visible image, the technical realization of the ANS as a musical instrument did not occur until twenty years later. Murzin was an engineer who worked in areas unrelated to music, and the development of the ANS synthesizer was a hobby and he had many problems realizing on a practical level. It was not until 1958 that Murzin was able to establish a laboratory and gather a group of engineers and musicians in order to design the ANS.

== Legacy ==
- Murzin's synthesizer was used by Alfred Schnittke, Stanislav Kreitchi, Sofia Gubaydulina, Edward Artemyev, and some other experimenting composers in Moscow.
- Much of the music for Andrey Tarkovsky film Solaris (1972) was created by Artemyev with the ANS.
- In 2003, British band Coil had released an album named ANS (using the synth itself).
- ANS (For Evgeny Murzin), Track 11 of the album For 2 by German musician Carsten Nicolai, released in 2010, was recorded live with the ANS Synthesizer at Theremin Center, Moscow State Conservatory.
