= Bolshoi =

Bolshoi (большой, meaning big, large, great, grand, etc.) may refer to:

- Bolshoi Theatre, a ballet and opera theatre in Moscow, Russia
  - Bolshoi Ballet, a ballet company at the Bolshoi Theatre
- Bolshoi Theatre, Saint Petersburg, a ballet and opera theatre in St. Petersburg, Russia
- The Bolshoi, an English post-punk band
- 26793 Bolshoi, a main-belt asteroid
- Bolshoi cosmological simulation, a NASA simulation of the universe
- Bolshoi, a bell in Danilov Monastery, Moscow
- Command Bolshoi, Japanese professional wrestler

== See also ==
- Alisher Navoi State Academic Bolshoi Theatre, Uzbekistan
- Bolshoi Drama Theatre, St.Petersburg
