= Polivoks =

Soviet duophonic analog synthesizer

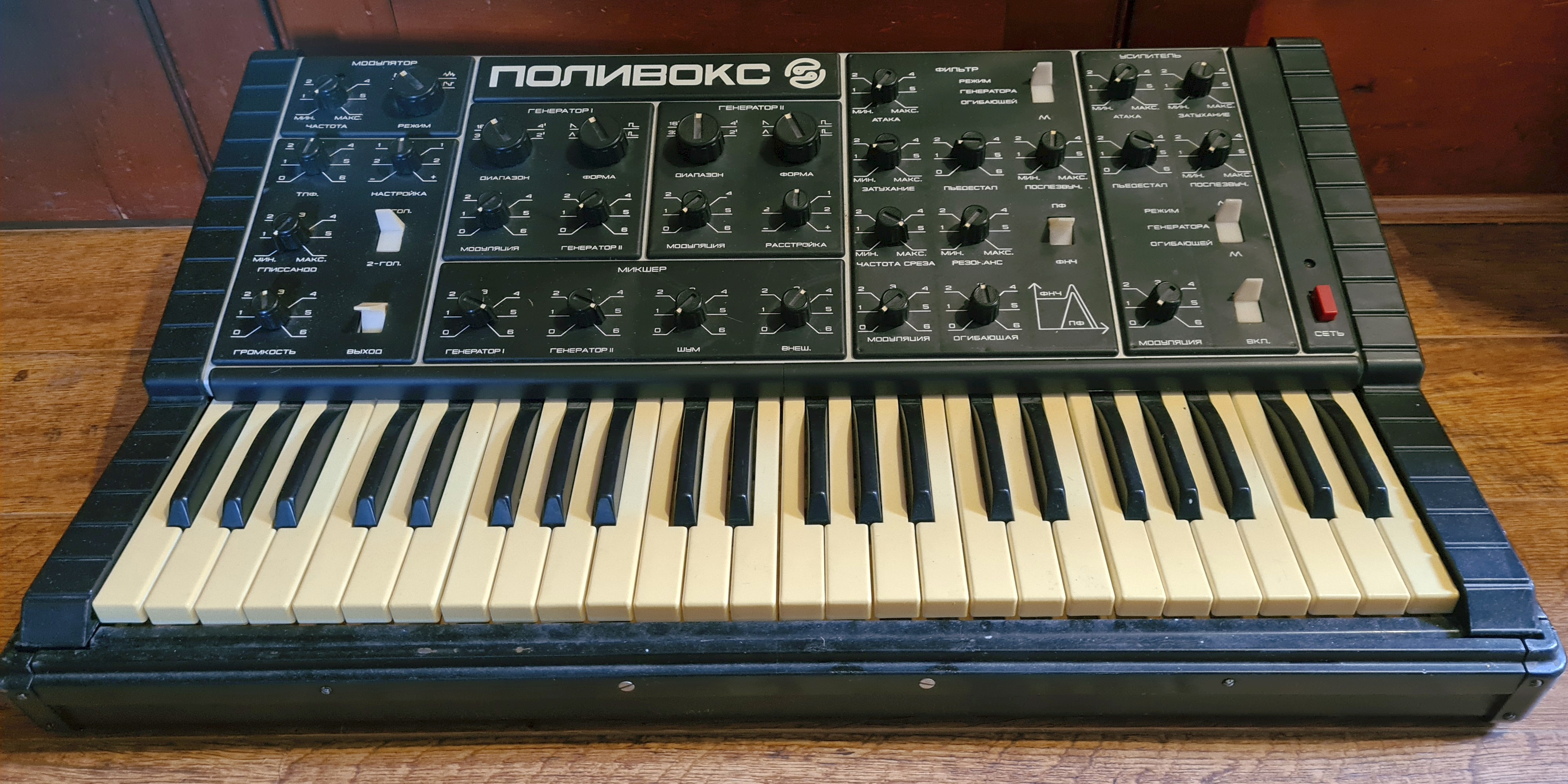
- Manufacturer: Formanta Radio Factory
- Dates: 1982 - 1990

Technical specifications
- Polyphony: 1-2
- Oscillator: 2 with triangle, saw, square and two different pulse settings
- LFO: Triangle, square, noise, S&H
- Synthesis type: Analog Subtractive
- Filter: Lowpass or bandpass
- Attenuator: ADSR for VCF, ADSR for VCA
- Aftertouch expression: None
- Velocity expression: None
- Storage memory: None

Input/output
- Keyboard: 48-key
- External control: None

A short demonstration of sounds created by a Formanta Polivoks synthesiser

The Polivoks (also occasionally referred to as the Polyvox; Russian: Поливокс) is a duophonic, analog synthesizer manufactured and marketed in the Soviet Union between 1982 and 1990. It is arguably the most popular and well-known Soviet synthesizer in the West, likely due to the uniqueness of both its appearance and sound.

The Polivoks was designed at the Urals Vector plant, but actual production was handled at the Formanta Radio Factory in Kachkanar, Russian SFSR. It was intended to appear and sound similar to American and Japanese synthesizers from companies such as Roland, Moog, and Korg. The Polivoks was engineered by circuit designer Vladimir Kuzmin (* October 1953 † 12 June 2026) with the appearance of the instrument influenced by his wife Olimpiada, who took inspiration from the design of Soviet military radios. Its retail price upon release was 920 roubles and over its lifetime around 100,000 Polivoks were manufactured - sometimes with a production rate of up to 1,000 units a month. However, according to information shared by Vladimir Kuzmin, only 200-300 Polvokses were produced per month. As such, the total number of produced units likely did not exceed 32,000.

The Polivoks has some features that are either unusual or uncommon on most analog mono synthesizers including a filter that can be switched from low pass to bandpass and two envelopes that can be looped over the AD (attack decay) sections.

Due to its unique history and relative rarity, the Polivoks has become popular as much for its unique sounds as for its aesthetics. It is often used by bands who take inspiration from the Soviet chic movement, as well as the ostalgie phenomenon in the former East Germany.

== Notable uses ==
- The Polivoks was used prominently on indie-rock band Franz Ferdinand's 2009 album Tonight: Franz Ferdinand, especially in the songs "Ulysses" and "Lucid Dreams" according to music critic Simon Maes.
- The Polivoks was used by the Russian indie-metal band KanZer, in song "Pepel" and "Plat'e"
- The Polivoks was used by Goldfrapp on their 2003 album Black Cherry.
- The Polivoks is also being used in trash-electro project of Kuba Kristo, Crashed Disco Balls, according to Bottomlayer.org.
- The Polivoks was used to compose music for the 2016 video game Doom.
- The Polivoks was also used to compose music for the 2020 video game Cyberpunk 2077.

== Recreations and imitations ==
=== Hardware ===
- Engineers Alexey Taber and Alex Pleninger worked together with original Polivoks designer Vladimir Kuzmin on a limited run of 100 units for a faithful reissue of the original synthesizer in a keyboardless, compact desktop format.
- Now Latvian (former Russian) company Elta Music produces another compact desktop version called "Polivoks-M" (or "Polivoks Mini") They also produced a Polivoks filter Eurorack module in 10 hp, with high pass, band pass and low pass options.
- Latvia-based Erica Synths provides a range of DIY kits for Polivoks-inspired modules in Eurorack modular synthesizer format. The modules include: VCO, mixer, modulator, VCA, VCF, and ADSR. These designs are available in form of DIY kits (the user receives the PCB, panel and components, and has to solder and assemble them by themselves) as well as prebuilt modules.
- The Harvestman manufactures Eurorack modules cloning the Polivoks functions, including the oscillator, filter, modulator, VCA and ADSR. These modules were designed in collaboration with the original Polivoks designer Vladimir Kuzmin.
- Papareil Synth Labs provides a PCB for a DIY clone of a Polivoks Filter.
- Mutable Instruments used to offer a Polivoks filter board for the now discontinued Shruthi synthesizer.
- Mutable Instruments type hardware kits including Polivoks type filter are now available via TubeOhm as Phoenix.

In July 2021, Vladimir Kuzmin announced a Partnership with the Company Behringer to rerelease the Polivoks Synthesizer. A photo of the Behringer Polivoks prototype in a tabletop 70 HP Eurorack module format was published in 2023; a prototype was also shown at Music China 2026.

=== Software ===
- A VSTi plugin has been developed that emulates the design, functionality and sound of the Polivoks, called "Polyvoks Station".
- Cherry Audio have created a comprehensive emulation of the Polyvoks known as Atomika. It is available in AU, VST, VST3, AAX, and standalone formats.
- A Rack Extension (RE) has been developed for Propellerhead's Reason software by Red Rock Sound, called "Ivoks Electromusical Synthesizer".
- The vintage subtractive VST-Synthesizer "Sawer" attempts to emulate "Polivoks" filters and envelopes (not oscillators) has been developed by Image-Line Software
- Leonardo Laguna Ruiz developed Vortex module which emulates a Polivoks filter, for virtual modular software VCV. https://modlfo.github.io/VultModules/vortex/
