= ANS synthesizer =

Music instrument based on graphical sound

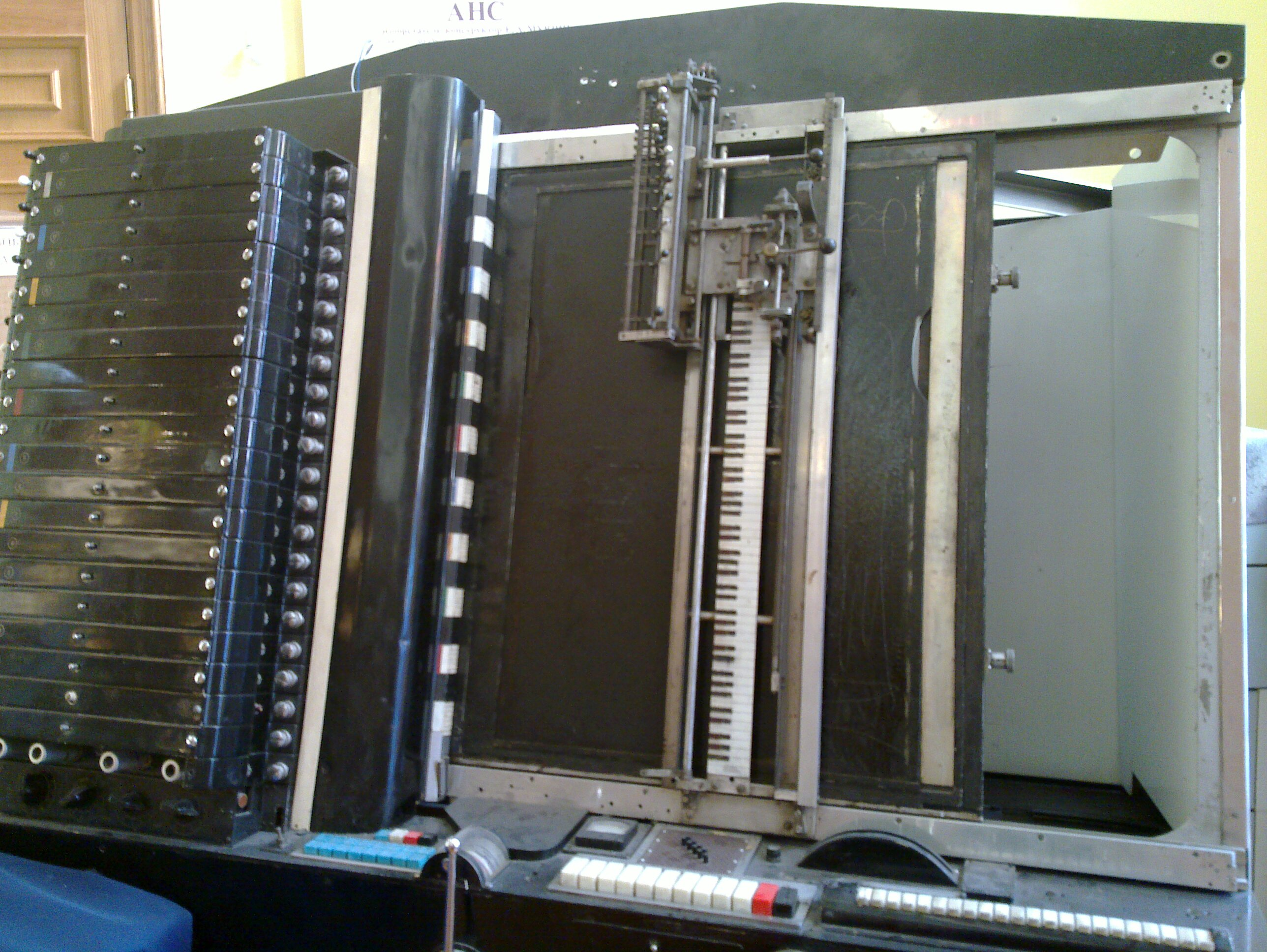
The ANS exhibited at Glinka Museum

Live demonstration of the ANS (October 2009)

The ANS synthesizer is a photoelectronic musical instrument created by Russian engineer Evgeny Murzin from 1937 to 1957. The technological basis of his invention was the method of graphical sound recording used in cinematography (developed in Russia concurrently with USA), which made it possible to obtain a visible image of a sound wave, as well as to realize the opposite goal—synthesizing a sound from an artificially drawn sound spectrogram.

In this case the sine waves generated by the ANS are printed onto five glass discs using a process that Murzin (an optical engineer) had to develop himself. Each disc has 144 individual tracks printed onto it, for a total of 720 microtones (discrete pitches), spanning 10 octaves. This yields a resolution of 1/72 octave (16.67 cents). The modulated light from these wheels is then projected onto the back of the synthesizer's interface. These are arranged in a continuous swath vertically, with low frequencies at the bottom and high frequencies at the top.

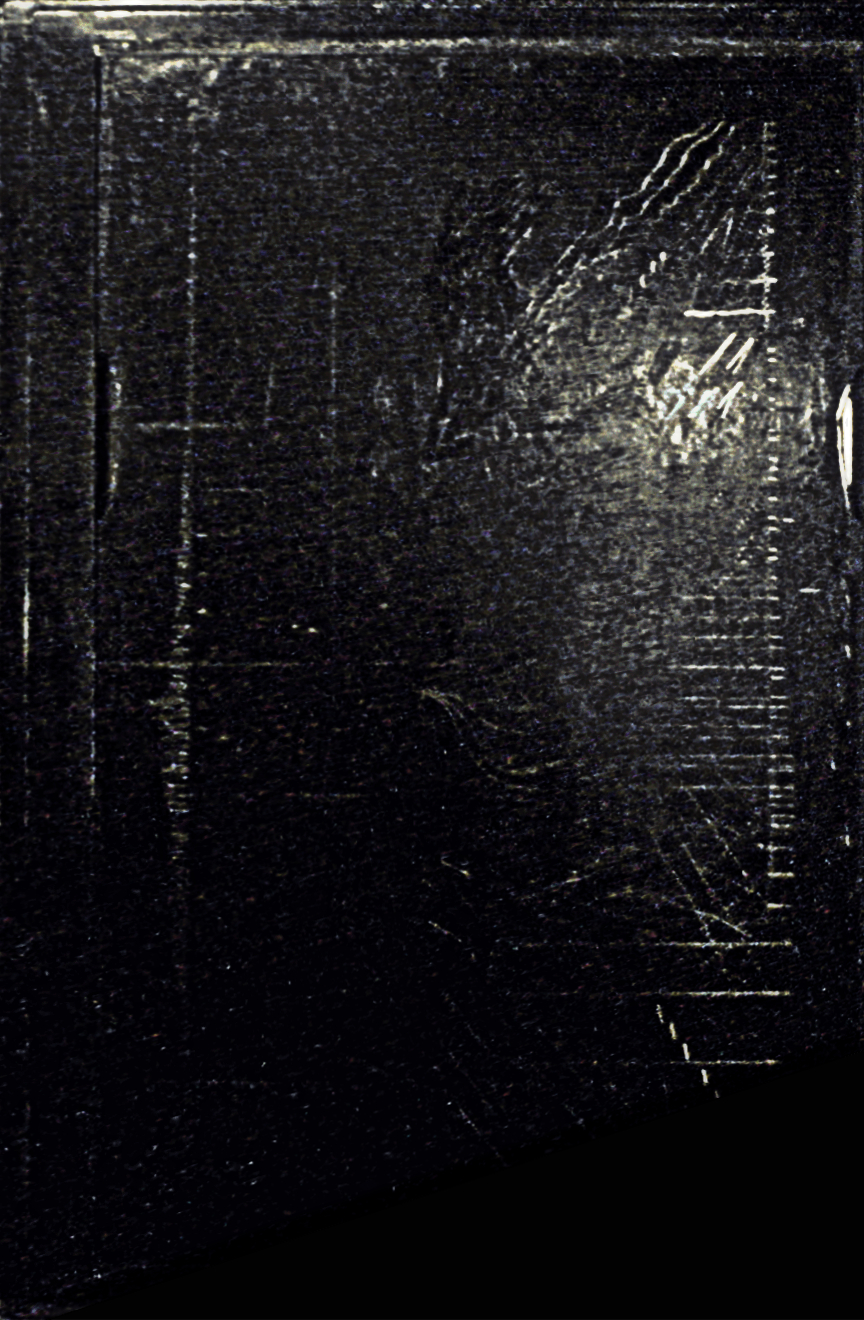
An example of score on glass plate

The user interface consists of a glass plate covered in non-drying opaque black mastic, which constitutes a drawing surface upon which the user makes marks by scratching through the mastic, and therefore allowing light to pass through at that point. (Note: Kreichi 1997: "The glass disk used in the photo-optic generator" (figure). and Zolotov 2020: "img3" (figure). — these small figures describing how ANS Synthesizer generate the sound: (1) On the bottom: the rotating glass disk (optical tonewheel) irradiated by a light beam through a slit, generates intermittent light beam corresponding to the multiple sound wave spectrum (with 144 pitches per disk). (2) On the middle: this intermittent light beam irradiate the score glass plate from the bottom, passes through the transparent area (caused by scratch) of the score glass plate. (3) On the top: the resulting light beam is incident to the multiple photocells above the score, and these outputs as electrical signals are summed, amplified and finally played through the loudspeaker, as the sound intended on the score. On the above process, (1) the intermittent light beam as the sound spectrum, and (2) score glass plate, are corresponding to Scriabin's colour keyboard.)

On the horizontal axis of the score, the time is plotted. The vertical axis is the pitch of the sounds on a logarithmic scale, i.e. the tempered scale of pure sinusoidal tones. The optical slit of the pure tone generator is located behind the score along the vertical pitch axis. Light beams modulated with pure tones are projected onto the optical slit. On the other side of the glass of the score is placed a reading photocell. The glass of the score can be moved in the direction of the time axis. Along the optical slit of the generator, all pure tones have the same width, and each tone occupies a definite geometric place according to the logarithmic scale of the pitch of sounds.

In front of the glass plate sits a vertical bank of twenty photocells that send signals to twenty amplifiers and bandpass filters, each with its own gain adjust control. It is akin to a ten-octave equalizer with two knobs per octave. The ANS is fully polyphonic and will generate all 720 pitches simultaneously if required (a vertical scratch would accomplish this).

The glass plate can then be scanned left or right in front of the photocell bank in order to transcribe the drawing directly into pitches. In other words, it plays what one has drawn, similar to how a score is written. This process can be aided with a gear-motor drive (similar to an engineering lathe) or it can be moved manually. The scan speed is adjustable down to zero. The speed at which the score scans has no relation to pitch but serves only as a means of controlling duration.

== History and creation ==
Scriabin's colour keyboard based on his color-sound theories. Murzin seems to have considered it as an archetype of his invention.

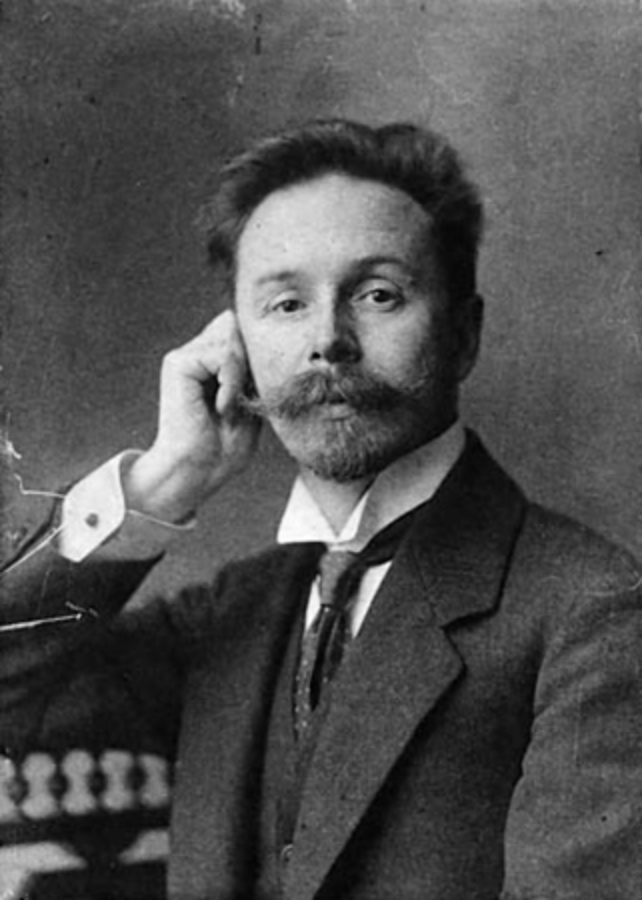
Alexander Nikolayevich Scriabin

Murzin named his invention in honour of the composer Alexander Nikolayevich Scriabin (ANS): Scriabin (1872–1915) was an occultist, theosophist, and early exponent of color-sound theories in composition. The synthesizer was housed in the electronic-music studio situated above the Scriabin Museum (just off of the Arbat in central Moscow) before moving to the basement of the central university on the corner of Bolshaya Nikitskaya. It was saved from the scrapheap thanks to Stanislav Kreichi, who persuaded the university to look after it.

The ANS was used by Stanislav Kreichi, Alfred Schnittke, Edison Denisov, Sofia Gubaidulina, and other Soviet composers. Edward Artemiev wrote many of his scores of the movies of Andrei Tarkovsky with the help of the ANS. Of particular note is Artemiev's score of Tarkovsky's Solaris in which the ANS was used to abstract, sci-fi effect akin to ambient music.

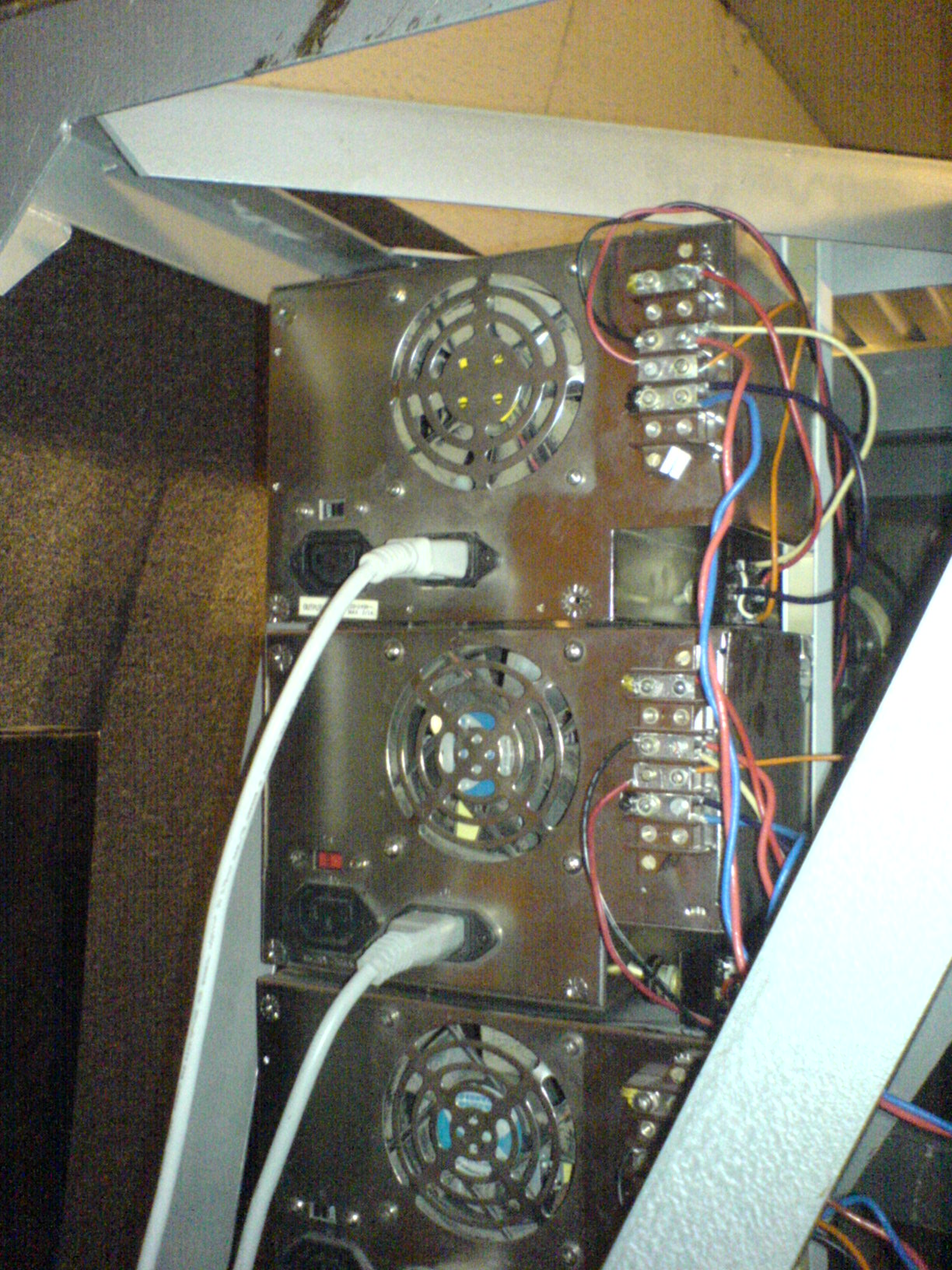
PC power supplies have replaced the old ones (February 2006)

After several years at the Theremin Center, the ANS (there is only one—the original was destroyed and this is the improved version) is now located in the Glinka State Central Museum of Musical Culture in Moscow.

== Recordings ==
An album of works by the composers mentioned above, called "Musical Offering" was released on Melodiya (C60 30721 000) in 1990—although the recordings date from the 1960s and 1970s. Recordings by Stanislav Kreichi—"Ansiana" and "Voices and Movement"—as well as earlier works ("Electroshock Presents: Electroacoustic Music") that used the synthesizer are available on Electroshock Records. A soundtrack of the film Into Space (1961) in collaboration with Edward Artimiev remains unreleased. In 2002, BBC Radio 4 broadcast a program about the ANS by Isobel Clouter as part of her Soundhunter series. In 2004, the British experimental group Coil released CoilANS, a boxed set of experimental drone music performed on the ANS. The Norwegian artist Zweizz released a cassette in 2007 on which side B is made entirely out of ANS recordings. The British experimental group T.A.G.C. utilized sounds generated on the ANS on two compositions that were released in 1996 on the Deepnet compilation album. ANS (For Evgeny Murzin), Track 11 of the album For 2 by German musician Carsten Nicolai, released in 2010, was recorded live with the ANS Synthesizer at Theremin Center, Moscow State Conservatory.

== Software Emulations ==
=== Virtual ANS ===
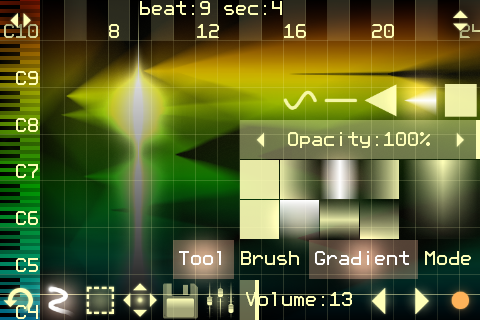
The main screen of Virtual ANS 2.0

Virtual ANS is an ANS simulator app by Alexander Zolotov, developer of the SunVox music creation software, initially released in 2007 and available for Microsoft Windows, macOS, Linux, iOS, and Android. Playback of the spectogram can be controlled with MIDI controllers since version 3.0, which was released in 2019. A 2013 review in the website for the music technology magazine Sound on Sound highly recommended it.

=== MZ2SYNTH ===
MZ2SYNTH demonstration clip (WARNING: contains loud and high-pitched sounds)

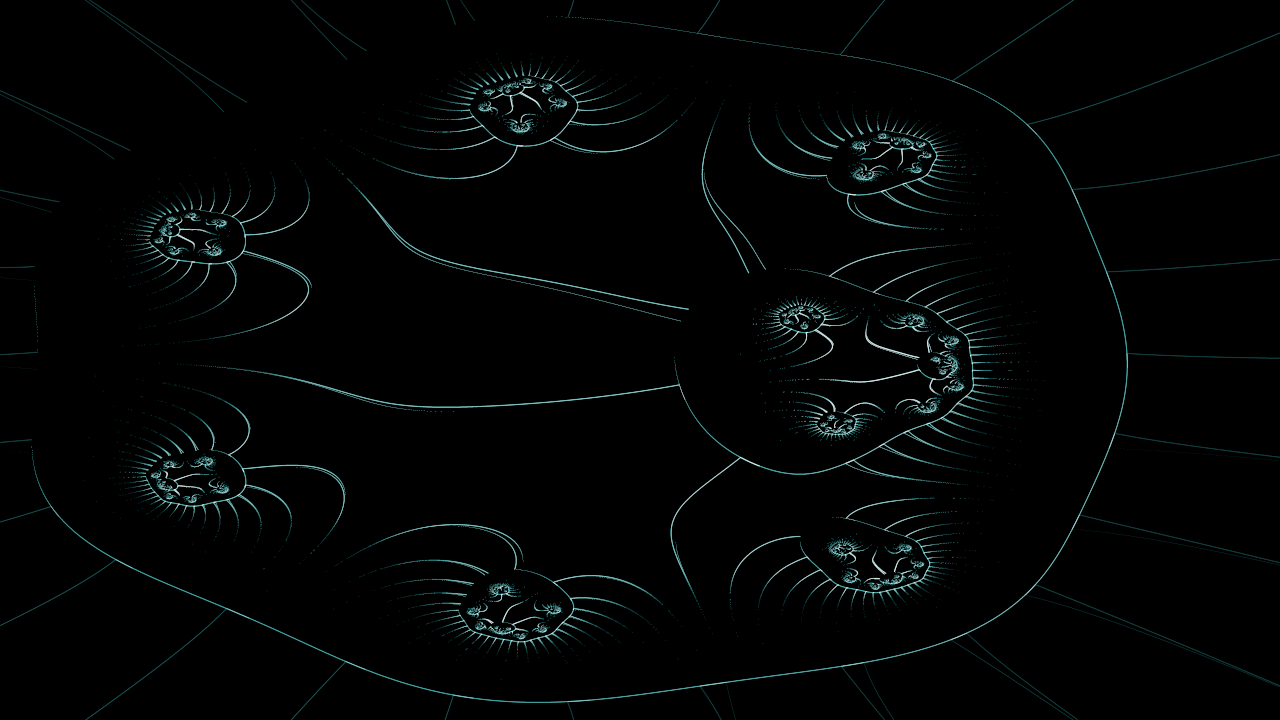
Graphical image from which demonstration clip was generated (luminance linked to sine oscillators)

MZ2SYNTH is an open-source wavetable synthesizer program, inspired by the ANS synthesizer, written in Fortran 2003. It is a command-line application which takes input in the form of a 720-row Portable pixmap image, and generates output in the form of a two-channel 32-bit floating point .au audio file. The 720 virtual oscillators span 10 octaves, and each oscillator generates sine, square, sawtooth and triangle waves. The four waveform types can be associated with any of the red, green, blue and luminance channels of the input image.

Using the SoX play command as a helper application, MZ2SYNTH can generate 48000 c.p.s. audio samples and play them in real time on a PC with a 3 GHz quad-core Intel i5 CPU, with any desired additional effects such as chorus, reverberation, etc.

MZ2SYNTH is actively developed on GitHub, and is currently in alpha pre-release status with basic features.

== See also ==
- List of Russian inventions
- Variophone (1930)
- Lichttonorgel [Light-tone-organ] (1936) — a sampling organ using optical-tonewheel, commercialized by Edwin Welte in 1936.
- Oramics (1957)
- Hugh Le Caine — a Canadian engineer who realized a similar instrument using electronic oscillators (Oscillator Bank), in 1959.

== Bibliography ==
Documents

- Stanislav Kreichi (1997-11-10). "The ANS Synthesizer: Composing on a Photoelectronic Instrument". Theremin Center.
- Andrey Smirnov (2013). "7. Graphical Sound: The ANS Synthesizer" (PDF). Sound in Z - Experiments in sound and electronic music in early 20th century Russia (PDF). London: Sound and Music / Koenig Books. pp. 227–236. ISBN 978-3-86560-706-5.

Patents

- USSR application 118695, Е.А. Мурзин (Murzin, E.A.), "Фотоэлектрический синтезатор музыки (Photoelectric Music Synthesizer)", published 1957-06-24.
  For the figurers lacked on above, see "Fig.1, 2". on: Е. А. Мурзин (1957-06-24). "ФОТОЭЛЕКТРИЧЕСКИЙ СИНТЕЗАТОР МУЗЫКИ". FindPatent.ru.

Discographies and reviews

- "The ANS Synthesizer discography (part 1)". 2011-07-07., "(part 2)". snowman-john.livejournal.com (in Russian and English). 2013-06-03.
- various artists (1999). Electroshock Presents Electroacoustic Music Volume 4 • Archive Tapes Synthesizer ANS 1964-1971 (CD, Compilation). Russia: Electroshock Records. ELCD 011.
  See also reviews on: "Electroacoustic music #4". Groove Unlimited. 39881. Archived from the original (reviews) on 2010-04-15.

Others

- Alexander Zolotov (2020-04-12). "Virtual ANS [simulator]". warmplace.ru.
- Peter Kirn (2019-06-06). "Jam like you're in a Tarkovsky film with this major app update". cdm.link.
- E. Lamprecht (2024). "Frankenbeans/MZ2SYNTH GitHub Repository". GitHub.
