= Evgeny Sazonov =

Soviet and Russian theater director

- Евгений Сазонов
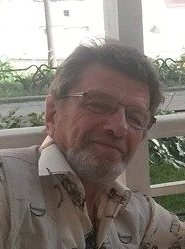
- Sazonov in 2016
- Born: 27 September 1936 (age 89); Leningrad, Russian SFSR, Soviet Union
- Occupations: Theater director; educator
- Awards: Honored Cultural Worker of the RSFSR

Evgeny Yuryevich Sazonov (Russian: Евгений Юрьевич Сазонов, IPA: [evgeˈnij sazoˈnov]; born 27 September 1936) is a Soviet and Russian theater director, teacher and artistic director of Theater of Youth Creativity (TYUT), Honored Cultural Worker of the RSFSR.

== Biography ==
Evgeny's first degree was in Pediatrics. He graduated from Saint Petersburg State Pediatric Medical University and for several years worked as a pediatrician.

In 1951, he enrolled in a drama club led by Matvey Dubrovin and that determined his subsequent life and career.

He graduated from the Boris Shchukin Theatre Institute, majoring in directing for drama in Boris Zakhava's group.

In 1974, after the death of the founder of Theater of Youth Creativity Matvey Dubrovin, he became the artistic director of TYUT.

Among the students of Evgeny Sazonov, pupils of Theater of Youth Creativity consist of many prominent people, such as Nikolay Fomenko, Alexei Devotchenko, Roman Trakhtenberg, and many other theater workers and alumni of different professions.

He is an honorable winner of the "Golden Sofit" (2016) - with a golden sign "For the dedicated work of many years on the education of new generations of theater for the Russian Theater".

== Performances and productions ==
- Rudolf Katz, Evgeny Sazonov Long-distance trains
- Evgeny Sazonov Timur stays on his post, director Evgeny Sazonov
- Rudolf Katz, Evgeny Sazonov Three swords for the three
- Rudolf Katz Tilly-Tilly-testo, director Evgeny Sazonov
- Mikhail Arkadyevich Svetlov 20 years later, director Evgeny Sazonov
- Rudolf Katz All of us and bulldozers, director Evgeny Sazonov
- Evgeny Schwartz The citizens of Leningrad, director Evgeny Sazonov
- Alexander Vampilov Eldest son, director Evgeny Sazonov
- Evgeny Sazonov Max, director Evgeny Sazonov
- Evgeny Sazonov Million's visitor, director Evgeny Sazonov
- Rudolf Katz Garden, director Evgeny Sazonov
- Aleksei Arbuzov City at dawn, director Evgeny Sazonov
- Alexander Khmeli And yet it moves, or the alien rushes through the sky, director Evgeny Sazonov
- Georgy Polonsky Ordinary fairy tale, director Evgeny Sazonov
- Evgeny Sazonov Ivan, Ivan's Grandson, director Evgeny Sazonov
- Evgeny Sazonov Afanasyeva, make a step forward, director Evgeny Sazonov
- Evgeny Sazonov Marshak's square, director Evgeny Sazonov
- Rudolf Katz The scenes at the Pushkin's House, director Evgeny Sazonov
- Ray Bradbury Fahrenheit 451, director Evgeny Sazonov
- Antoine de Saint-Exupéry The Little Prince, director Evgeny Sazonov
- Astrid Lindgren Ronia the Robber's Daughter, director Evgeny Sazonov
- William Shakespeare Romeo and Juliet, director Evgeny Sazonov
- Edmond Rostand Cyrano de Bergerac, director Evgeny Sazonov
- Astrid Lindgren Pippi Longstocking, director Evgeny Sazonov
- Anton Chekhov Uncle Vanya, director Evgeny Sazonov
- Alexander Volodin Lizard, director Evgeny Sazonov
- Arkady Averchenko End of love, director Evgeny Sazonov
- William Shakespeare Hamlet, director Evgeny Sazonov
- Sławomir Mrożek Portrait, director Evgeny Sazonov

== Literature ==
- Evgeny Sazonov "City of the Masters: From the experience of the Leningrad Theater of Youth Creativity of the Order of the Red Banner of the Palace of Pioneers" - Moscow: Pedagogika, 1984, 129 p.
- Evgeny Sazonov "Particles of the whole" - St. Petersburg: Baltic Seasons, 2011, 486 p. - ISBN 978-5-903368-60-0
- Theater of Youth Creativity - Teaching magazine "Rakurs" No. 25, St. Petersburg: GOU "SPbGDTYu" 2006. - 76 p. - ISBN 5-88494-061-0
