= Alisa Ivanova =

Russian theatre director and acting teacher

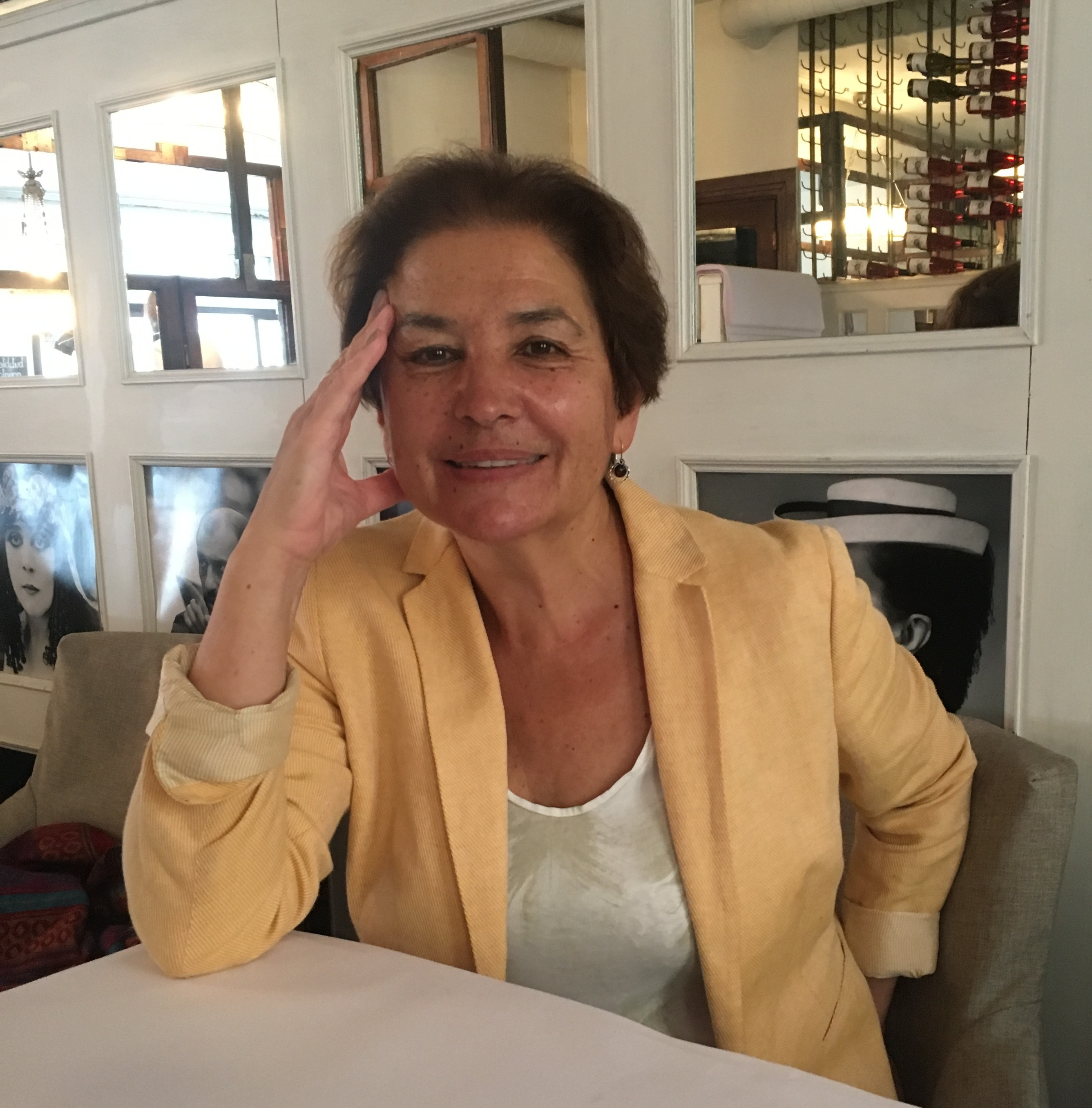
- Alisa Ivanova in 2019
- Born: Alisa Akhmedievna Shirinskaya; Leningrad, Soviet Union
- Education: Boris Shchukin Theatre Institute
- Occupations: theatre director, acting teacher
- Years active: 1980s–present

Alisa Ivanova (born 1954, née Shirinskaya) is a Russian theatre director, acting teacher, specialist in actor training, and associate professor at the Russian State Institute of Performing Arts in Saint Petersburg.

== Biography ==
During her school years in Leningrad, Ivanova studied at the Theater of Youth Creativity under the direction of Matvey Dubrovin, where she received her first stage and editorial experience. She also participated in creative programmes at the Orlyonok All-Union Children's Center during her TYuT years. In 1977, she graduated from the music college affiliated with the Rimsky-Korsakov Saint Petersburg State Conservatory, specializing in piano. In 1985, she graduated from the Boris Shchukin Theatre Institute with a degree in directing. In 2003, she completed postgraduate studies at the Saint Petersburg State Academy of Theatre Arts. Since 2001, Ivanova has taught at the Russian State Institute of Performing Arts, where she has worked for more than two decades in the studio of Veniamin Filshtinsky. In 2024, she became head of the first acting and directing course at the Baltic branch of the institute in Kaliningrad. She is a member of the Union of Theatre Workers of the Russian Federation.

== Directing work ==
As a theatre director and teacher, Ivanova has staged and supervised productions based on works by Anton Chekhov, Ivan Turgenev, Alexander Ostrovsky, and Maxim Gorky.

Her productions include:

- The Seagull. Masha's Dreams (2017)
- Three Sisters
- A Month in the Country
- Without Guilt Guilty
- The Lower Depths
- The Miracle Worker
- Tomorrow Was the War, based on the novella by Boris Vasilyev
- Dandelion Wine

== International work ==
Ivanova has conducted master classes, theatre laboratories, and intensive workshops devoted to the actor training system of Nikolai Demidov in Austria, the United Kingdom, Denmark, China, Peru, and the United States.

== Publications ==
- Ivanova, A. A. Actor Training: The Demidov Approach. Moscow: GITIS Publishing, 2021. ISBN 978-5-91328-321-4.
