= Burov =

Burov (Bulgarian: Буров, Russian: Буров) is a Slavic male surname, its feminine counterpart is Burova. It may refer to

- Aleksandr Burov (born 1975), Russian footballer
- Atanas Burov (1875–1954), Bulgarian banker and politician
- Boris Burov (born 1970), Russian-Ecuadorian Olympic weightlifter
- Ilya Burov (born 1991), Russian freestyle skier
- Nikolai Burov (born 1953), Russian actor, cultural administrator, and museum director
- Olga Burova (born 1963), Russian Olympic discus thrower
- Oleg Igorevich Burov, fictional character in the television series The Americans
