= Direct Heiress =

- Russian: Наследница по прямой
- Directed by: Sergey Solovyev
- Written by: Sergey Solovyev
- Starring: Tatyana Kovshova; Tatyana Drubich; Aleksandr Zbruyev; Sergey Shakurov; Igor Nefyodov
- Cinematography: Pavel Lebeshev
- Edited by: A. Abramova
- Music by: Isaac Schwarts
- Release date: 1982
- Country: Soviet Union
- Language: Russian

Direct Heiress (Russian: Наследница по прямой) is a 1982 Soviet romantic drama film directed by Sergey Solovyev.

== Plot ==
The film tells about an unusual girl who considers herself the direct heiress of Pushkin. For her, adult relationships are false and empty. And suddenly a friend of her father, along with his son, comes to visit them.

== Cast ==
- Tatyana Kovshova
- Tatyana Drubich
- Aleksandr Zbruyev
- Sergey Shakurov
- Igor Nefyodov
- Andrei Yuritsyn
- German Shorr
- Anna Sidorkina
- Aleksandr Porokhovshchikov
- Sergei Plotnikov
