= House under the Starry Sky =

1991 film

- Directed by: Sergei Solovyov
- Written by: Sergei Solovyov
- Starring: Mikhail Ulyanov; Alla Parfanyak; Aleksandra Turgan; Maria Anikanova; Aleksandr Bashirov
- Cinematography: Yuri Klimenko
- Music by: Boris Grebenshchikov
- Release date: 1991
- Running time: 114 minutes
- Country: Soviet Union
- Language: Russian

House under the Starry Sky (Russian: Дом под звёздным небом, romanized: Dom pod zvyozdnym nebom) is a 1991 Soviet comedy-drama/speculative fiction film directed by Sergei Solovyov. It is the final installment of the director's trilogy: Assa (1987) / Black Rose Is an Emblem of Sorrow, Red Rose Is an Emblem of Love (1989) / House Under the Starry Sky (1991).

== Plot ==
Set in the late Soviet period of Perestroika, the plot centers on the family of a prominent Soviet academician, Bashkirtsev, a successful scientist and deputy of the Supreme Soviet. Upon returning from an abroad assignment, he realizes he's being followed. At his anniversary celebration, his son-in-law Konstantin brings along his "friend from Mosconcert", Valentin Komposterov, who behaves in an extremely provocative manner. Attempting a magic trick, he saws Konstantin's wife (Bashkirtsev's daughter) in half, then gets drunk and passes out. The next day, he declares that he can no longer "reassemble" her two halves now that "everything has healed". From then on, Komposterov acts like a literal evil spirit, bringing death and ruin into Bashkirtsev's home. Bashkirtsev requests bodyguards, and soon more and more policemen flood his residence.

Bashkirtsev's daughter, Nika, meets a young man named Timofey on Arbat Street. He is a flute player who lives in an empty hangar where he's building a hot-air balloon from stolen materials. A romance blossoms between them.

After the academician's death and funeral (he had been kidnapped and tortured by mysterious men whose actions parody stereotypes of KGB covert operations) his family flies to the U.S., where his eldest son Boris lives. Nika stays behind to wrap up some affairs. Komposterov reappears, threatening Konstantin (who remained in Russia) with death before arriving at the house. Unbeknownst to him, Nika is still present. When he leaves to buy vodka, Konstantin, Nika, and Timofey escape in a Pobeda car, immediately pursued. Caught in the crossfire are a mentally disabled plumber named Zhora and Komposterov himself, whose mangled corpse the fugitives later spot in a wrecked car. Yet soon after, the trio encounters Komposterov again, alive and unharmed. This time, Konstantin shoots him, and the supposedly dead monster dissolves into water.

As Konstantin, Timofey, and Nika begin ascending in the hot-air balloon, the resurrected Komposterov kills Kostya with a laser beam. But ultimately, Timofey and Nika manage to finish off the villain for good—shooting him again, burning the corpse, and urinating on it. They fly away in the balloon just as KGB agents arrive to capture them.

== Cast ==
- Mikhail Ulyanov as academician Andrey Bashkirtsev
- Alla Parfanyak as Sonia, Bashkirtsev's wife
- Aleksandra Turgan as Lisa, Bashkirtsev's eldest daughter
- Maria Anikanova as Nika, Bashkirtsev's younger daughter
- Valery Svetlov as Boris, Bashkirtsev's son
- Olga Malinina as Judi, Boris's wife
- Anna Solovyova as Catherine, daughter to Boris and Judi
- Ilya Ivanov as Konstantin, Lisa's husband
- Aleksandr Bashirov as Valentin Komposterov, an evil spirit / the beauty in metro / the border guard
- Aleksandr Abdulov as Zhora, the mentally disabled plumber
- Yuriy Dumchev as a cameo appearance
- Sergey Kuryokhin as a cameo appearance
