= TYUT =

TYUT may refer to:

- Taiyuan University of Technology, a public university in Taiyuan, Shanxi, China
- Theater of Youth Creativity, a youth theatre school in Leningrad
