= The Lifeguard (1980 film) =

- Russian: Спасатель
- Directed by: Sergey Solovyov
- Written by: Sergey Solovyov
- Starring: Tatyana Drubich; Vasily Mishchenko; Sergey Shakurov; Olga Belyavskaya; Vyacheslav Kononenko
- Cinematography: Pavel Lebeshev
- Edited by: A. Abramova
- Music by: Isaac Schwartz
- Production company: Mosfilm
- Release date: 1980
- Running time: 101 minutes
- Country: Soviet Union
- Language: Russian

The Lifeguard (Russian: Спасатель, romanized: Spasatel) is a 1980 Soviet romantic drama film directed by Sergey Solovyev.

The film tells the story of a lifeguard preparing to leave for military service who becomes entangled in the lives of two women—one posing as his girlfriend and another he rescues from despair—each are drawn to him as they navigate their own struggles with love and identity.

== Plot ==
Lifeguard Vilya (Wilhelm) Tishin, working at an OSVOD rescue station, is preparing to leave for mandatory military service. His mother, wanting to celebrate the occasion, suggests he invite friends and a girlfriend, though Vilya doesn’t have one. To solve this, he asks a casual acquaintance, Olya, to pose as his girlfriend for the event. Their brief interaction leads to intimacy, but the future of their relationship remains uncertain.

Meanwhile, Asea Vedeneeva, a former high school graduate secretly in love with her literature teacher Larikov, returns to town. Now a medical student married to the dull and materialistic tailor Ganin, she decides to visit Larikov with a thoughtful gift for his birthday, but he remains indifferent to her feelings. Distraught, she attempts suicide by rowing out to sea, only to be saved by Vilya, who happens to be nearby. She confides in him, revealing she is pregnant, and they form a spiritual connection. Ganin later confronts Larikov out of jealousy, brandishing a rifle but ultimately backing down. In the end, as Vilya departs for the army, both Asea and Olya see him off, each harboring affection for him.

== Cast ==
- Tatyana Drubich as Asya Vedeneyeva
- Vasily Mishchenko as Vilya
- Sergey Shakurov as Larikov
- Olga Belyavskaya as Olya
- Vyacheslav Kononenko as Ganin
- Alexander Kaidanovsky as Varaksin (voice by Anatoli Romashin)
- Sergey Khlebnikov as Badeykin
- Vasili Lyovushkin as Pasha
- Galina Petrova as Lika
- Yekaterina Vasilyeva as Klara
