= Ducky-Ducky-Ducky =

- Directed by: Sergei Solovyov
- Written by: Stasya Venkova
- Produced by: Anton Treushnikov; Tikhon Pendyurin; Boris Nelepo
- Starring: Stasya Venkova; Anastasia Teplinskaya; Sergei Solovyov
- Cinematography: Tim Lobov
- Music by: Anna Drubich
- Release date: January 27, 2020
- Running time: 16 minutes
- Country: Russia
- Language: Russian

Ducky-Ducky-Ducky (Russian: Ути-ути-ути, romanized: Uti-uti-uti) is a 2020 Russian short film directed by Sergei Solovyov. Movie party of the competition program of the 49th Rotterdam Film Festival.

== Cast ==
- Stasya Venkova as Nicole
- Anastasia Teplinskaya as Mila
- Sergei Solovyov as old fisherman
