= Nikolai Burov =

- Николай Витальевич Буров
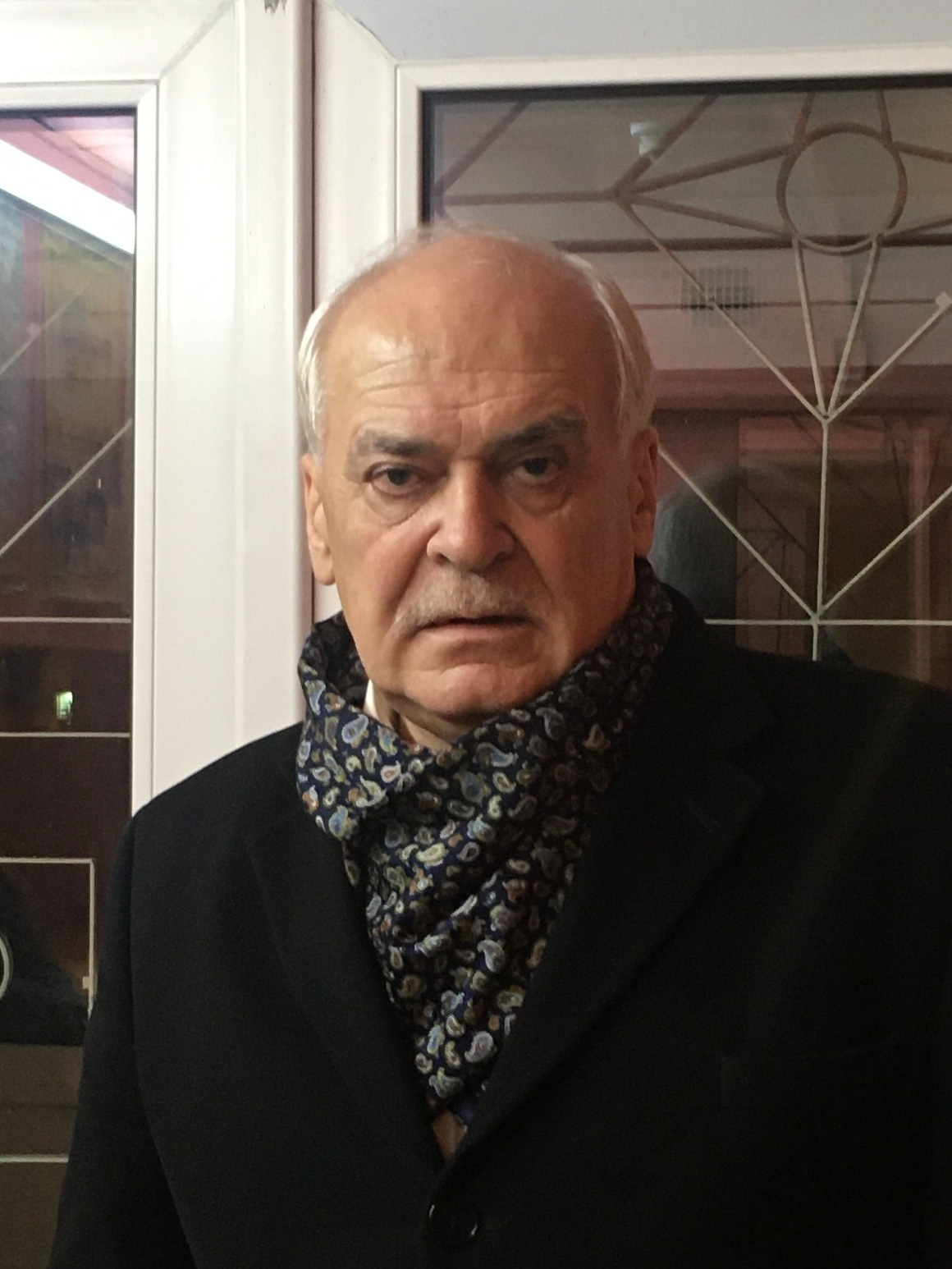
- Burov in the Youth Creativity Theatre archive
- Born: Nikolai Vitalyevich Burov; February 12, 1953 (age 73); Leningrad, Russian SFSR, Soviet Union
- Citizenship: Russia
- Education: Russian State Institute of Performing Arts
- Occupations: Actor, museum director, cultural administrator, television presenter
- Years active: 1974–present
- Employers: Alexandrinsky Theatre; Saint Isaac's Cathedral Museum
- Known for: Director of Saint Isaac's Cathedral Museum (2008–2017)

Nikolai Burov (Russian: Николай Витальевич Буров; born 12 February 1953) is a Russian actor, cultural administrator, television presenter, and museum director. He served as director of the Saint Isaac's Cathedral State Museum in Saint Petersburg from 2008 to 2017. He was awarded the title of Honored Artist of the RSFSR in 1985 and People's Artist of the Russian Federation in 2001.

== Biography ==
Burov was born in Leningrad on 12 February 1953. In 1965 he joined the Theater of Youth Creativity under the direction of Matvey Dubrovin. In 1970 he entered the Russian State Institute of Performing Arts (then the Leningrad Institute of Theatre, Music and Cinematography), graduating in 1974. During his student years he performed leading roles in productions based on works by Anton Chekhov, Konstantin Simonov, and Friedrich Dürrenmatt.

=== Acting career ===
In 1974 Burov joined the company of the Bryantsev Youth Theatre under director Zinovy Korogodsky. From 1978 to 2005 he was an actor of the Alexandrinsky Theatre, where he appeared in more than thirty productions.

His notable stage roles included:

- Don Juan in Don Juan
- Professor Higgins in Pygmalion
- Alexander Nevsky in Alexander Nevsky
- Meluzov in Talents and Admirers
- The Postmaster in The Government Inspector

In parallel with his theatre work, Burov appeared in film, radio, and television productions and became a prominent voice actor in Russian dubbing.

=== Public service ===
In 1985 Burov was elected to the Leningrad City Council. From 2001 to 2005 he served as chairman of the Saint Petersburg branch of the Union of Theatre Workers of the Russian Federation. From January 2005 to June 2008 he served as chairman of the Committee for Culture of the Government of Saint Petersburg. From 3 June 2008 until 1 June 2017 he served as director of the Saint Isaac's Cathedral museum complex. His resignation in 2017 attracted national media attention amid debates over the transfer of the cathedral to the Russian Orthodox Church.

=== Television ===
Burov later hosted documentary television projects, including:

- Other Romanovs (2019–2021)
- Nevsky Ark. Theory of the Impossible (since 2021)

== Selected filmography ==
- Master and Margarita (2005)
- Streets of Broken Lights (1997–1998)
- Black Raven (2001–2004)

== Awards and honors ==
- Honored Artist of the RSFSR (1985)
- People's Artist of the Russian Federation (2001)
- Order of Honour (Russia) (2006)
- Distinguished Cultural Worker of Poland (2006)
- Officer's Cross of the Order of Merit of the Republic of Poland (2011)
- Honorary Professor of the Saint Petersburg Conservatory (2024)
