= Tatyana Drubich =

Russian actress

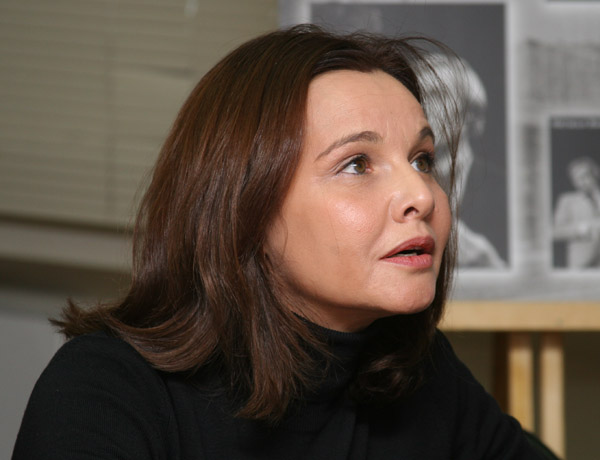
- Born: 7 June 1959 (age 66); Moscow, Russian SFSR, Soviet Union
- Occupation: Actress
- Years active: 1975—present

Tatyana Drubich (born 7 June 1959) is a Russian film actress. She has appeared in 20 films since 1972. She starred in the 1974 film Sto dney posle detstva, which was entered into the 25th Berlin International Film Festival where it won the Silver Bear for Best Director. She was the wife of Russian film director Sergei Solovyov.

== Selected filmography ==
- Sto dney posle detstva (1974) - Lena Ergolina
- And Then There Were None (1987) - Vera Claythorne
- Assa (1987) - Alika
- The Black Monk (1988) - Tania
- Black Rose Is an Emblem of Sorrow, Red Rose Is an Emblem of Love (1989) - Alexandra
- Hello, Fools! (1996) - Ksenia Zasypkina/Polina Derulen
- Moscow (2000) - Olga
