= One Hundred Days After Childhood =

1975 film

- Original Polish film poster
- Directed by: Sergei Solovyov
- Written by: Sergei Solovyov; Aleksandr Aleksandrov
- Starring: Boris Tokarev; Tatyana Drubich
- Cinematography: Leonid Kalashnikov
- Music by: Isaac Schwartz
- Release date: 1975
- Running time: 89 minutes
- Country: Soviet Union
- Language: Russian

One Hundred Days After Childhood (Russian: Сто дней после детства, romanized: Sto dney posle detstva) is a 1975 Soviet teen romance film directed by Sergei Solovyov. It was entered in the 25th Berlin International Film Festival where Solovyov won the Silver Bear for Best Director.

== Plot ==
Pioneer leader Serge, a sculptor, decides to work in a new plastic material, among creatively gifted children in a camp located in an old mansion. Pioneer Lopukhin is so in love with his classmate Ergolina that he does not notice how fascinated Sonya Zagremukhina is with him. Showing their emotions and moods helps their participation in the production of the play "Masquerade" by Lermontov, and the play itself imperceptibly turns into a drama with unexpected confessions, insults, jealousy, and outbursts. The teens are so busy with their feelings that they do not pay attention to the pedagogical ideas of Pioneer Serge, and by the end of the film, with no additional encouragement, they are ready for a commemoration of first love.

== Cast ==
- Boris Tokarev as Mitya Lopukhin
- Tatyana Drubich as Lena Ergolina
- Irina Malysheva as Sonya Zagremuhina
- Yuri Agilin as Gleb Lunyov
- Sergey Shakurov as Sergey Borisovitch
- Andrei Zvyagin as Sasha Lebedev
- Sergey Khlebnikov as Radist
- Nina Menshikova as Ksenia Lvovna
- Yuri Sorkin as Furikov
- Tatyana Yurinova as Zalikova
- Arina Alejnikova as Doctor

== See also ==
- Could One Imagine?
