= Liubomiras Laucevičius =

Lithuanian actor (born 1950)

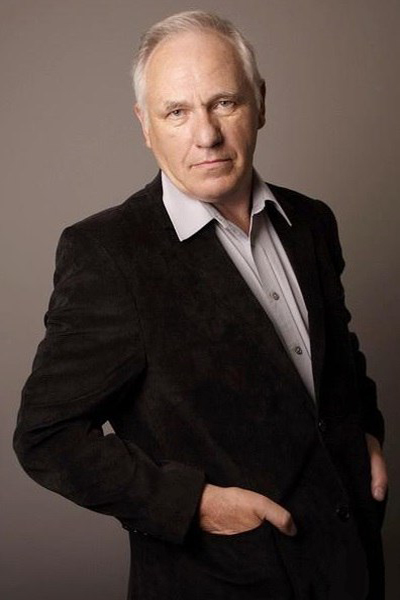
- Born: 15 June 1950 (age 75); Vilnius, Lithuanian SSR, Soviet Union
- Other name: Luko senelis
- Occupation: Actor
- Years active: 1979–present

Liubomiras Laucevičius (born 15 June 1950) is a Lithuanian actor. He has appeared in more than fifty films since 1979.

Officer of the Order of the Lithuanian Grand Duke Gediminas (3 July 2020).

== Selected filmography ==
Year	Title	Role	Notes
1985	Come and See	Kosach	
1986	Wild Pigeon	Ivan Naydenov's father	
1990	Stalingrad	Kuzma Gurov	
1990	Mother	Mikhail Vlasov	
1992	Spider	Albert	
2000	The Romanovs: An Imperial Family	Yakov Yurovsky	
2005	The Master and Margarita	Afranius	
2005	Dungeons & Dragons: Wrath of the Dragon God	Mage #1	
2009	Taras Bulba	Mazowiecki	
2018	I Want to Live	sanatorium director	
