= Far from Home (1975 film) =

1975 film

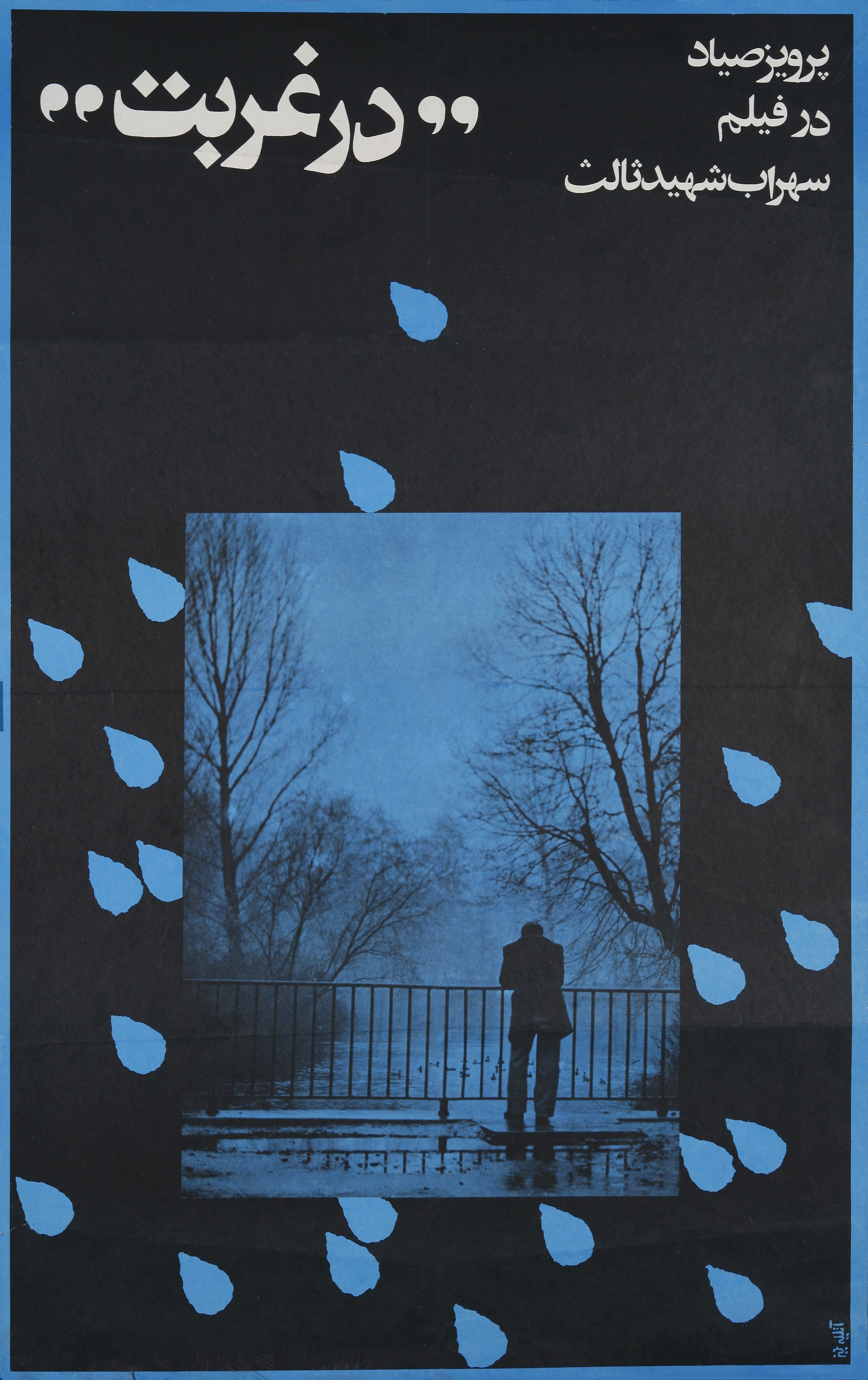
- Directed by: Sohrab Shahid-Saless
- Written by: Sohrab Shahid-Saless; Helga Houzer
- Produced by: Otto Erich Kress
- Starring: Parviz Sayyad
- Cinematography: Ramin Reza Molai
- Edited by: Ruhallah Emami
- Release date: 1 August 1975
- Running time: 91 minutes
- Country: Iran
- Languages: Turkish, German, Persian

Far from Home (Persian: در غربت, romanized: Dar Ghorbat) is a 1975 Iranian film directed by Sohrab Shahid-Saless. It was entered into the 25th Berlin International Film Festival.

== Plot ==
A household of Turkish gastarbeiter (or guest workers) in West Germany is depicted in Far From Home, one of three early films that Shahid Saless co-wrote with his then-partner Helga Houzer. The film depicts the suffering of loneliness—the boundaries of language, social graces, and racist exclusion—as promised by Shahid Saless's title card. It's also a film of unexpected beauty, whether it's through subtly creative camera angles, shades of green, or quick, non-melodramatic expressions of warmth.

== Cast ==
- Parviz Sayyad as Husseyin
- Cihan Anasai as Student
- Muhammet Temizkan as Kasim
- Hüsamettin Kaya as Osman
- Imran Kaya as Osmans Frau
- Sakibe Kaya as Osmans Tochter
- Wurdu Püsküllü
- Ursula Kessler as Alte Frau
- Renate Derr as Frau im Park
- Stanislaus Solotar as Arbeiter in der Kantine
- Heinz Bernard as Arbeiter in der U-Bahn
