= Rolandas Kazlas =

Lithuanian actor and theatre director

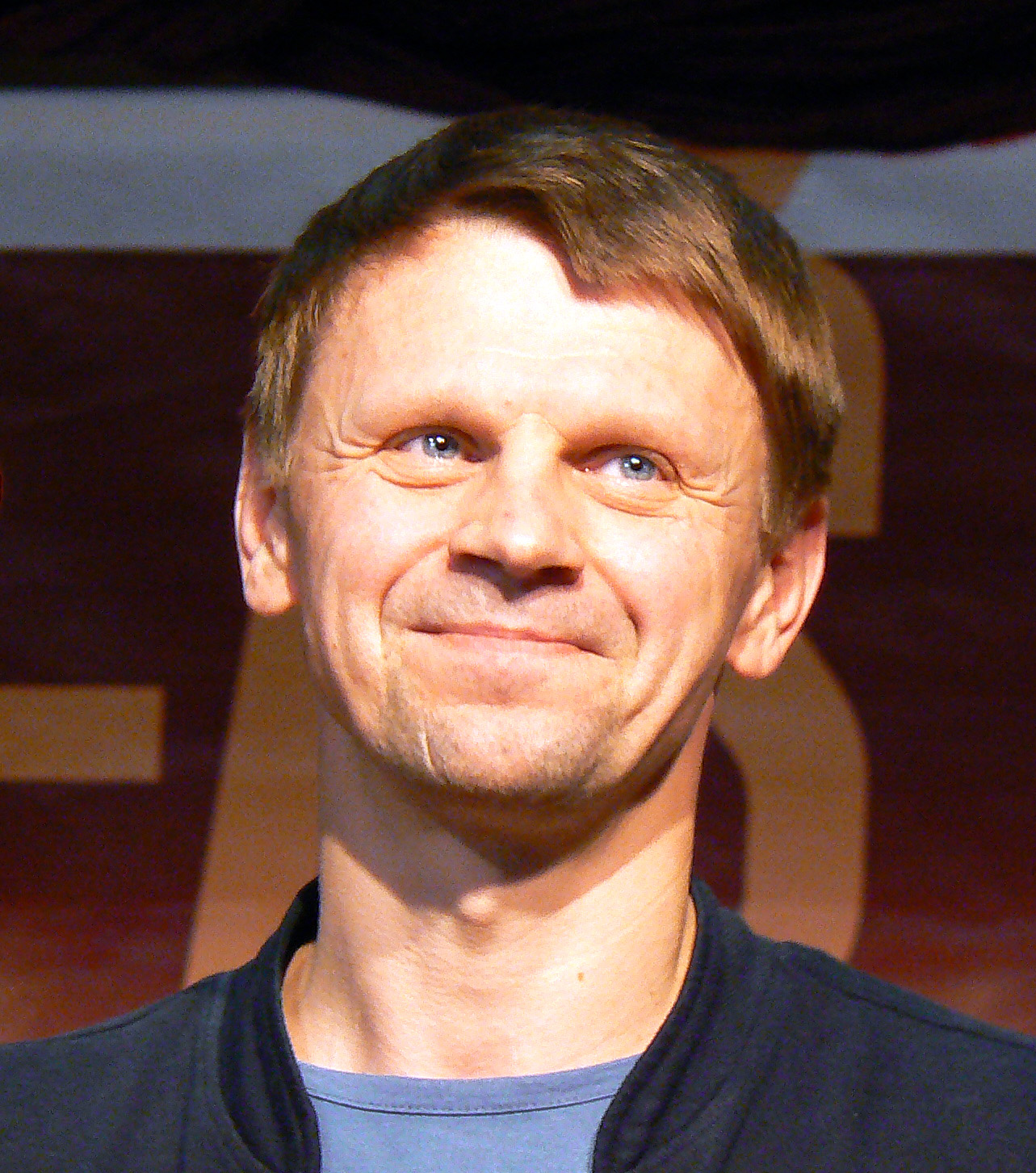
- Kazlas in 2011
- Born: Rolandas Kazlas; 11 May 1969 (age 57); Molėtai, Lithuanian SSR, Soviet Union
- Occupations: actor, theatre director
- Years active: 1990-present

Rolandas Kazlas (born 11 May 1969 in Molėtai) is a Lithuanian actor, comedian, and theater director. He was awarded Lithuanian National Culture and Arts prize winner in 2009.

== Biography ==
Rolandas Kazlas was born in 1969 in Molėtai town, Lithuania. In 1987, he graduated from Molėtų high school. In 1991, Kazlas graduated from the Lithuanian Academy of Music and Theatre with a degree in acting. He became a Valstybinis Jaunimo Teatras actor in 1993. He is currently a free director and creator. He has played and continues to play at Lithuanian National Drama Theatre and Meno Fortas.

== Notable roles ==
=== Theatre ===
Acting roles
Year	Title	Director	Notes
1993	Piladas - "Electricity" ("Elektra").	Irena Kriauzaitė	
1993	Karlėnas - “Siuvėjų dienos Silmačiuose	Povilas Gaidys	
1993	Utešitelnas - "Gamblers" (”Lošėjai”)	Hamish Glen	
1993	Karalaitis - “Karalaitis amato mokėsi”	Aurelija Čeredėjevaitė	
1994	Estebizas - “Orfėjas”	Jokūbas Vilius Tūras	
1994	Sanča Pansa - “Don Kichotas”	Saimonas Povelas	
1996	Patronas Julijus - “Saga apie Gestą Berlingą”	Prytas Pedajasas	
1996	Kristianas - “Sirano”	Ignas Jonynas	
1997	Rotmistras - "Father" (“Tėvas”)	Jonas Vaitkus	
1998	Pitu - “Memuarai”	Dalia Tamulevičiūtė	
1998	Foma Opiskinas - "Stepančikovo dvaras"	Foma Opiskinas	
2000	Jagas - "Otelas"	Eimuntas Nekrošius	
2003	Kunigaikštis Gavrila - “Dėdulės sapnas”	Cezaris Graužinis	
2004	Kaligula - “Kaligula”	Ignas Jonynas	
2005	Lebiadkinas - "Demonai. Nelabieji. Apsėstieji. Kipšai"	Algirdas Latėnas	
2005	Astrovas, Michailas Lvovičius “Dėdė Vania”	Jonas Vaitkus	
2007	Karalius Ignotas - "Ivona, Burgundo kunigaikštytė"	Jonas Vaitkus	
2007	Andželas - "Jei taip, tai šitaip"	Paul Eugene Budraitis	
2008	Napoleonas Šereika - "Patriots" ("Patriotai")	Jonas Vaitkus	
2008	Migelis - "Raiši žirgai nešuoliuoja"	Ignas Jonynas	
2009	Ligonis Gromovas - "Palata"	Rolandas Kazlas	
2010	Teisininkas - "Raštininkas Bartlbis"	Rolandas Kazlas	
2013	Dantė - "Dieviškoji komedija"	Eimuntas Nekrošius	

As director
Year	Title	Notes
2009	Geležis ir sidabras	
2009	Palata	
2010	Raštininkas Bartlbis	
2019	Pamoka	

=== Movies ===
- Kids from American Hotel ("Vaikai iš Amerikos Viešbučio") (1990)
- Jazz ("Džiazas") (1992)
- Utterly Alone ("Vienui vieni") (2004)
- Balkonas (2008)
- I Want to Live (2018)

=== Television ===
He also made appearances in "Dviračio žinios" (LNK) and is the author and the main character of the television series "Nekenčiu reklamos" - showed since 2000 on BTV.
