= Nekenčiu reklamos =

- Created by: Rolandas Kazlas
- Starring: Rolandas Kazlas
- Country of origin: Lithuania
- No. of seasons: 1
- No. of episodes: 33

Original release
- Network: BTV
- Release: 2000 – 2001

Nekenčiu reklamos (literally: I hate commercials) is a Lithuanian comedy show, starring Rolandas Kazlas.

It consists of non-sense funny commercials and Pranas Rupšlaukis' life near television. There are 33 episodes, which were shown in 2000–01.
