= Wild Pigeon (film) =

1986 film by Sergei Solovyov

- Directed by: Sergei Solovyov
- Written by: Sergei Solovyov
- Starring: Vyacheslav Ilyushchenko; Liubomiras Laucevičius; Ludmila Savelyeva; Andrei Bitov; Aleksandr Bashirov
- Cinematography: Yuri Klimenko
- Music by: Isaac Schwartz
- Production companies: Kazakhfilm, Mosfilm
- Release date: 1986
- Running time: 100 minutes
- Country: Soviet Union
- Language: Russian

Wild Pigeon (Russian: Чужая белая и рябой, romanized: Chuzhaya Belaya i Ryaboi, also known as Someone Else's White and the Speckled and The Stray White And The Speckled) is a 1986 Soviet drama film written and directed by Sergei Solovyov. It was entered into the main competition at the 43rd Venice International Film Festival, in which it won the Special Jury Prize. The film was selected as the Soviet entry for the Best Foreign Language Film at the 59th Academy Awards, but was not accepted as a nominee.

== Plot ==
The film takes place in the autumn of 1946, in a small provincial town in western Kazakhstan. A local teenager Ivan Naydenov (Vyacheslav Ilyushchenko) nicknamed as "The Gray" due to his personally narrated history of developing Poliosis from typhus, is a passionate pigeon enthusiast who recklessly risking his life manages to catch a white dove which has unexpectedly appeared in the city. Other pigeon hobbyists of the city find out of The Gray's spoil and the dove hunting begins. Soon the thieves kidnap the pigeon from The Gray's pen at night. The Gray begins to search for and find the dove from the local "pigeon authority" – Kolya the Gypsy (Vladimir Steklov). The Gray cunningly recaptures his prey and realizing that the dove is still doomed releases it to freedom. All the events of the film unfold against the backdrop of a meager post-war life of the inhabitants of the town - a place of exile and evacuation.

== Cast ==
- Vyacheslav Ilyushchenko as Ivan Naydenov "Gray"
- Aleksandr Bashirov as "Freak"
- Andrei Bitov as Pyotr Petrovich Startsev "Pepe" pianist, composer, ex-husband of Ksenia Nikolaevna
- Arkady Vysotsky as brother of "Duffer"
- Ilya Ivanov as Investigator Benjamin Jousse
- Tatiana Ignatova as spectator in the theater under the open sky
- Liubomiras Laucevičius as father of Ivan Naydenov
- Boris Ryakhovskiy as Rakov
- Ludmila Savelyeva as Xenia Nikolaevna Startseva, actress
- Anatoly Slivnik as Colonel Pylypenko
- Vladimir Steklov as Kolya's "Gypsy"
- Bapov Sultan as Murat, friend of Ivan Naydenova, a student of Pyotr Petrovich
- Vyacheslav Kuchanov as "Tushkan"
- Mikhail Levchenko (II) as "Joker"
- Sergey Mildenberger as second brother of "Duffer"
- Boris Olehnovich as Martyn
- Andrey Filozov as Savitsky
- German Schorr as Misha Nelyubov

== See also ==
- List of submissions to the 59th Academy Awards for Best Foreign Language Film
- List of Soviet submissions for the Academy Award for Best Foreign Language Film
