= Kolibri (band) =

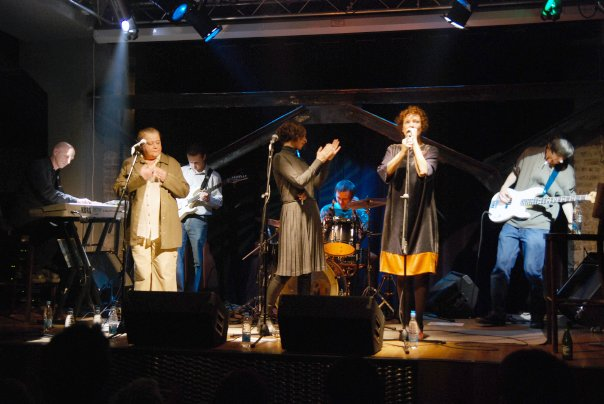
- Kolibri on stage the Place Club in Saint Petersburg. 10 October 2010

Background information
- Origin: (Russia) Saint Petersburg
- Genres: experimental rock avant-pop baroque pop
- Years active: 1988–present
- Labels: FeeLee Records; Real Records; Gala Records; Triary Records
- Members: Yelena Yudanova; Irina Sharovatova; Inna Volkova
- Past members: Natasha Pivovarova; Olga Feshchenko; Oleg Emirov; Andrey Gradovich
- Website: http://www.kolibri.spb.ru/

Kolibri is a Soviet and Russian experimental pop/rock group formed in 1988 in Saint-Petersburg playing an eclectic brand of baroque pop blended with elements of post-punk, cabaret, chanson and dominated by vocal harmony. In their heyday Kolibri, according to rock historian Andrey Burlaka, combined ironic high posturing with touchingly humane attitude, writing and performing songs that were described variously as exquisite, depressive, extravagant, romantic, naive, sophisticated and decadent. The band released six studio albums which were well received by critics both in Europe and in Russia but never had any commercial success.

Natasha Pivovarova, Kolibri's founding member, left in 1998 to form her own band Sous (The Sauce). She died in a car crash in Crimea, Ukraine, in September 2007.

== Band history ==
Kolibri were formed in 1988, originally as a side project for Natalya Pivovarova (born 17 July 1963 in Novgorod), then a member of Sergey Kuryokhin's Populyarnaya Mekhanika. She invited six other girls, who were associated with the Leningrad Rock Club but hadn't had any stage experience, to join, and suggested they form a kind of musical theater and perform covers in a cabaret/avant-garde/post-rock fashion. On 8 March 1988 the septet premiered their Vacation of Love set (its title referring to the Japanese film) at the Leningrad Rock Club. According to critic Andrey Burlaka the concert caused furore and the girls became an overnight sensation in the city's cultural scene. By their next gig, Kolibri had five members: Pivovarova, Yelena Yudanova, Irina Sharovatova, Olga Feshchenko, and Inna Volkova. Soon the band members started writing their own material.

=== Debut ===
In November 1989, Kolibri went into Aquarium's portable studio to record their Американская жена (American Wife) demo and next month started working on their debut album in the Titanic Studio with producer Alexandr Titov (ex-Aquarium). Among those taking part in the recording were Oleg Sakmarov (flute, oboe), Piotr Akimov (cello), Alexey Ratzen (drums) and two Televizor's guitarists, Alexandr Beliaev and Maxim Kuznetzov. In 1990 the debut album Манера поведения (Manie′ra Povede′niya, Manner of Conduct) was released, first unofficially, then a year later on FeeLee Records in Russia. Two years later it was released in the USA.

The band went on tour using the instrumental studio backing track and asserting (according to Allmusic) "their nonconformity with theatrical stage antics and costuming, in their case identical black ballet outfits and colored gloves."

=== The 'classic' years ===
1991 saw Kolibri performing at the Rock Club's 10th Anniversary concert and at the Internedelja Festival in Novosibirsk, alongside N.O.M., Orkestr A and The Shamen among others. They took part in Nantes' Leningrad Days (Lеs Allumees fest) and later played in Germany, Finland and Sweden. In 1992 Videofilm company made a musical film Колибри в Париже и Дома (Kolibri in Paris and at Home). Demonstrated occasionally in Petersburg theaters throughout 1990s, it has never been released on video. By this time Olga Feshchenko has left the group and settled in Paris.

Kolibri's second album Маленькие трагедии (Ma′lenkie Trage′dii, Little Tragedies) was recorded in 1992, with the session musician and arranger Yuri Sobolev and guitarist Aleksandr Gnatyuk. A song from the album, "Zholty List Osenni" (Yellow Leaf of Autumn), written and sung by Elena Udanova, became Russian radio hit.

On 8 March 1993, the group celebrated their fifth anniversary by playing in Slava Polunin's show. In 1994 Kolibri recorded Найди десять отличий (Find Ten Differences). Produced by Andrei Muratov of DDT fame and released by Triary Records, it is regarded as their best. This time they were supported in the studio by bassist Vyacheslav Koshelev, ex-Auktyon drummer Igor Cheridnik, various members of Prepinaki (the latter's frontman Alex Lushin was Natasha Pivovarova's husband at the time) and Aleksandr Belyaev of Nautilus Pompilius.

The experimental Бес Сахара (Bes Sahara, a pun which could mean both 'Without Sugar' or 'Sugar Demon', its working title having been - 'Princesses Don't Poo'), recorded with Tequilajazzz was released by Gala Records. The members of Tequilajazzz joined the girls on stage to become for a while Kolibri's backing band.

In 1998 Kolibri starred in Aleksandr Bashirov's film Zheleznaya Pyata Oligarkhyi (The Iron Heel of Oligarchy). In May of that year the band joined the line-up of Sergey Kuryokhin's 2nd annual S.K.I.F. Festival organized in New York City by David Gross, the good friend of the latter.

=== Pivovarova's departure ===
In December 1998 Natasha Pivovarova left the band to pursue a solo career. She went on to work as a producer for Molochny Shake (another all-girl group which some critics labeled "the teenage Kolibri") and sang duets with Alexandr Lushin and his band. In January 2000 she formed a new group (or "the association" as they preferred to call themselves) named Соус (Sous, The Sauce).

In less than a year Kolibri re-emerged with the two new members, Oleg Emirov (keyboards and arrangements; ex-Golye) and Andrey Gradovich (guitar). After a year of touring Europe the reformed Kolibri made their first Saint Petersburg appearance; their 24 December 2000 concert in Teatr Estrady garnered fine reviews.

The album, Любовь и её конечности (Lyubov I yeyo konechnosti, Love and its Limbs) recorded in the Signal Studios with producer Sergey Rusanov (ex-Ulitzy, Televizor) was shelved to be released a year later by Real Records, almost simultaneously with their next work, Troi, a collaboration with the Volkovtrio members, Vladimir Volkov and Svyatoslav Kurashov.

In the course of the next two years Kolibri played several festivals (including S.K.I.F.) and appeared in studio compilations (like the two Aquarium members tribute — first Dyusha Romanov's, then Boris Grebenshchikov). The band's 15th anniversary concerts in Moscow and Petersburg saw Natasha Pivovarova joining her ex-colleagues on stage. By this time Emirov has left and Kolibri joined forces with Soundscript 33, an instrumental trio led by saxophonist and composer Dmitry Fyodorov.

Natasha Pivovarova, Kolibri's founding member, died in a car crash in Crimea, Ukraine, in September 2007.

In 2009 Yudanova, Volkova and Sharovatova along with Soundscript 33 recorded Железные звезды (Zheleznye zvyozdy, Iron Stars), which later made its way into Vzglyad newspaper's list of 12 best World albums of that year. In 2013 Апокрифы (Apocrypha), the collection of rarities, was released online.

Andrey Gradovich died on 5 October 2026, at the age of 60.

== Discography ==
=== Studio albums ===
- Манера Поведения (1991, - Manera povedeniya, Code of Conduct)
- Маленькие трагедии (1992, - Malenhkiye tragedii, Little Tragedies)
- Найди десять отличий (1994, - Naidi desyat otlichiy, Find Ten Differences)
- Бес Сахара (1997, - Bes Sakhara, Sugar Demon)
- Ремиксы (1998, - Remixes)
- Любовь и ее конечности (2002, - Lyubov I yeyo konechnosti, Love and Its Extremities)
- Железные звезды (2009, - Zheleznye zvyozdy, Iron Stars)

== See also ==
- Tемочка, A Little Theme (Nobody's Around, Kolibri video
