= Alexei Devotchenko =

Russian actor and activist

- Алексей Девотченко
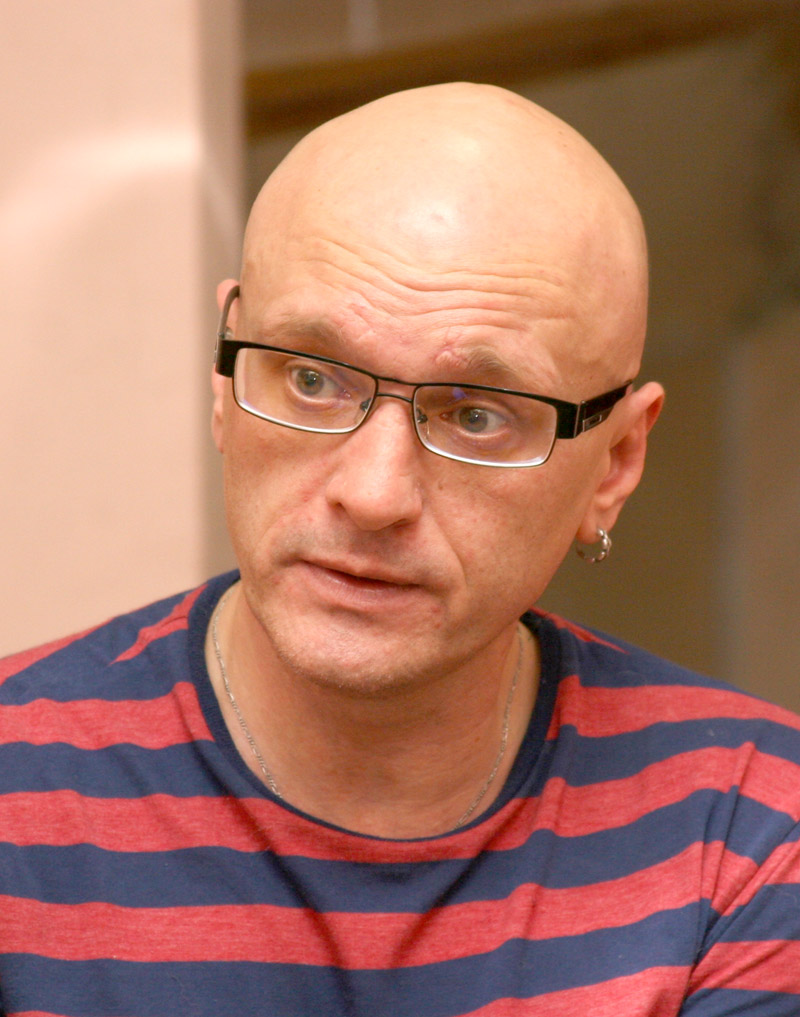
- Devotchenko in 2012
- Born: Alexei Valerievich Devotchenko; 14 October 1965; Leningrad, RSFSR, USSR
- Died: 5 November 2014 (aged 49); Moscow, Russia
- Occupations: actor, activist
- Years active: 1990–2014
- Spouse: Svetlana Friedman
- Children: son Kirill
- Awards: State Prize of the Russian Federation (1999, 2003)

Alexei Valerievich Devotchenko (Russian: Алексе́й Вале́рьевич Дево́тченко; 14 October 1965 – 5 November 2014) was a Russian actor and activist.

Born in Leningrad, he studied at the school No. 179 of the Kalinin District (1973-1983). Devotchenko got his first acting experience in Theater of Youth Creativity (1978-1983). In 1990 he graduated from the Cherkasov Leningrad State Institute of Theatre, Music and Cinematography, workshop of Arkady Katzman and Lev Dodin. He was a member of the United Civil Front in St. Petersburg, the participant Dissenters. On 10 March 2010 he signed the appeal of the Russian opposition "Putin must go".

On 18 November 2011, in his Live Journal blog Devotchenko announced that he refused the title Honored Artist of Russia and the two State Prizes of Russia, and called on cultural figures to boycott events that support the Russian government. In March 2014, he signed a letter "We are with you!" opposing the Russian military intervention in Ukraine.

On 5 November 2014, Alexei Devotchenko was found dead in a pool of blood in his apartment in Moscow.
