= Aleksandr Bashirov =

Russian actor, director and screenwriter

Alexander Bashirov
- Александр Баширов
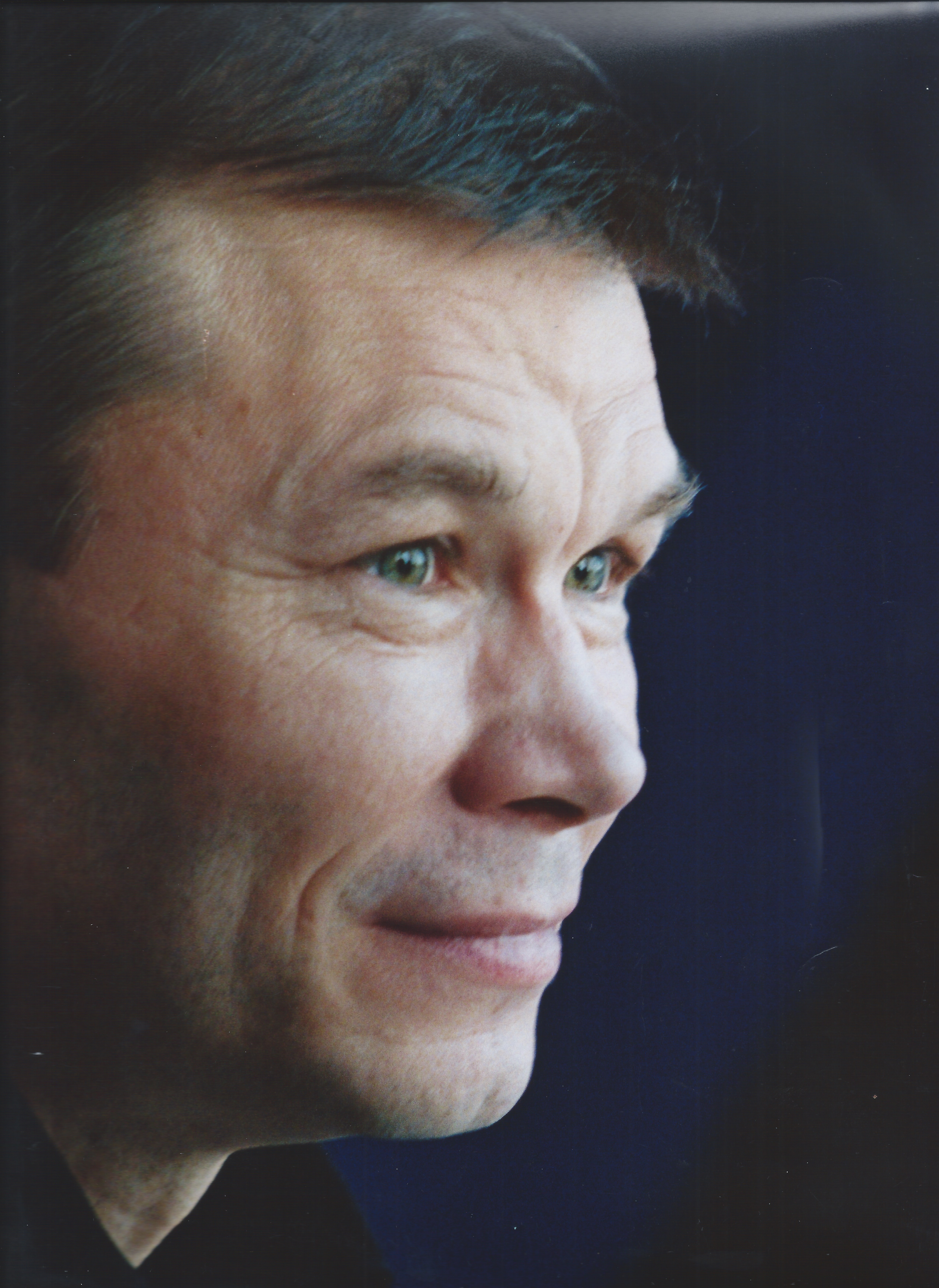
- Bashirov in 2019
- Born: 24 September 1955 (age 71); Sogom, Khanty-Mansiysky District, Soviet Union
- Occupation: Actor
- Years active: 1986–present
- Spouse: Inna Volkova
- Children: 2

Alexander Nikolaevich Bashirov (Russian: Александр Николаевич Баширов; born 24 September 1955) is a Russian film and theater actor, director and screenwriter. He performed in more than sixty films since 1986.

== Biography ==
Bashirov was born on 24 September 1955 in the village of Sogom. He was born in a mixed family of ethnic Russian father Nikolay Zakharovich Kosygin and Siberian Tatar (Kurdak Tatar) mother Mariya Katyrovna Bashirova.

He married a US citizen and in 1990-1991 he studied acting at the Herbert Berghof Studio in New York, periodically coming to the USSR to participate in the filming.

In 1996 he organized in St. Petersburg studio Deboshirfilm, which is the artistic director and teacher of actor-director's workshop.

In 2014, Bashirov started the work on documentary titled Donbass knocks in our heart dedicated to separatists from the Donetsk People's Republic and Luhansk People's Republic. The development of the film was supported by Fedor Bondarchuk who took the producer role. The production of the film was later cancelled.

=== Personal life ===
He is married to singer Inna Volkova (born 1964) from Kolibri. Daughter - Alexandra Maria, a son from his first marriage - Christopher.

=== Political views ===
In 2014, he illegally crossed the border of Ukraine in the area not controlled by the Ukrainian government, to support the Donetsk People's Republic and Luhansk People's Republic separatists.

== Selected filmography ==
=== Films ===
Film
Year	Title	Role	Notes
2017	Kharms (Хармс)	Kharms' neighbour / Woman falling	
2014	Yolki 1914 (Ёлки 1914)	sailor Zheleznyak	
2010	The Edge (Край)	Zhilkin	
2009	O Lucky Man! (О, счастливчик!)	Perelman	
2009	Attack on Leningrad (Ленинград)	Squint	
2007	Cargo 200 (Груз 200)	alcoholic	
2006	Piter FM (Питер FM)	building manager	
2005	The 9th Company (Девятая рота)	ensign	
2005	Dead Man's Bluff (Жмурки)	man tied to a chair	
2002	Bear's Kiss (Медвежий поцелуй)	trader animals	
2001	Mechanical Suite (Механическая сюита)	man in a police car	
2001	Poisons or the World History of Poisoning (Яды, или Всемирная история отравлений)	Arnold Sharapov	
2001	Sisters (Сёстры)	Seyfullin	
2001	Down House (Даун-хаус)	Ferdyshchenko	
1999	The Iron Heel of Oligarchy (Железная пята олигархии)	Nikolai Petrovich	director, screenwriter, producer
1998	Khrustalyov, My Car! (Хрусталёв, машину!)	Fyodor Aramyshev	
1991	House under the Starry Sky (Дом под звёздным небом)	Valentin Komposterov	
1989	Black Rose Is an Emblem of Sorrow, Red Rose Is an Emblem of Love (Чёрная роза — эмблема печали, красная роза — эмблема любви)	Tolik	
1988	Needle (Игла)	Spartak	
1987	Assa (Асса)	Babakin	
1986	Wild Pigeon (Чужая белая и рябой)	eccentric	

=== TV ===
TV
Year	Title	Role	Notes
2020	The Last Minister (Последний министр)	Prime Minister of Russia	
2018	House Arrest (Домашний арест)	Grigory	
2013	Sherlock Holmes (Шерлок Холмс)	Kerslake, the Office of the Clerk of Her Majesty	
2005	The Master and Margarita (Мастер и Маргарита)	Behemoth	
2005	Bandit Petersburg (Бандитский Петербург)	therapist	
2005	The Fall of the Empire (Гибель империи)	Lavr Kornilov	
1997	Streets of Broken Lights (Улицы разбитых фонарей)	Vladimir	

== Awards ==
- 1998 - Film Festival Viva Cinema of Russia! In St. Petersburg, the press prize
- 1998 - Film Festival Window to Europe in Vyborg, a special prize Guild of Film Critics
- 1998 - Open Russian Film Festival in Sochi, the FIPRESCI prize
- 1999 - Film Festival Literature and Cinema in Gatchina, the Grand Jury Prize for the film The Iron Heel of Oligarchy, the prize for Best Actor, Special Jury Prize
- 1999 - Alexandria International Film Festival, the top prize for best European film
- 1999 - International Film Festival in Rotterdam, the prize Tiger Award
