= Kharms (film) =

- Directed by: Ivan Bolotnikov
- Screenplay by: Ivan Bolotnikov
- Produced by: Ekaterina Borisova; Leonid Choub; Ieva Norviliene; Sasho Pavlovski; Andrey Sigle
- Starring: Aleksandr Bashirov; Grigoriy Chaban; Aiste Dirziute; Andrey Feskov; Darius Gumauskas; Nikita Kukushkin; Artyom Semakin; Wojciech Urbanski
- Cinematography: Shandor Berkeshi
- Music by: Soni Petrovski
- Production companies: Author Studio; Proline Film; Lithuanian Film Center; Macedonian Film Agency
- Release dates: 23 June 2017 (SIFF); 2 November 2017 (Russia)
- Country: Russia
- Language: Russian

Kharms (Russian: Хармс) is a Russian-Lithuanian-Macedonian biographical film about the Russian poet Daniil Kharms directed by Ivan Bolotnikov. Its planned release date was 2 November 2017. It received the awards for Best Cinematography and Best Screenplay at the Shanghai International Film Festival in 2017.

== Plot ==
In the center of the story is the elegant writer Daniil Yuvachev, who continues to call himself the genius Kharms, despite the fact that his works still have not been published. He is poor and is not understood by women with whom he communicates. He feels at home at various literary events at which he is constantly present. The film tells about his battle with himself, with his shortcomings, desires and the whole world which is pressing upon him.

== Cast ==
- Wojciech Urbanski as Kharms
- Aleksandr Bashirov as Kharms' neighbour / old woman who fell from the window
- Grigoriy Chaban as Alexander Vvedensky
- Aiste Dirziute as Marina Malich
- Andrey Feskov as Leonid Lipavsky
- Darius Gumauskas as Yakov Druskin
- Nikita Kukushkin as nephew Sno
- Artyom Semakin as Nikolay Zabolotsky
