= I Want to Live (2018 film) =

2018 film

- Directed by: Justinas Krisiūnas
- Starring: Rolandas Kazlas; Indrė Patkauskaitė
- Release date: 23 November 2018
- Running time: 110 minutes
- Country: Lithuania
- Language: Lithuanian

I Want to Live (Lithuanian: Širdys) is a 2018 Lithuanian drama film directed by Justinas Krisiūnas.

== Cast ==
- Rolandas Kazlas as Mentor Andrius
- Indrė Patkauskaitė as Nurse Gabija
- Liubomiras Laucevičius as Sanatorium director
- Algirdas Gradauskas as Snapas
