= Lev Dodin =

Russian theater director (born 1944)

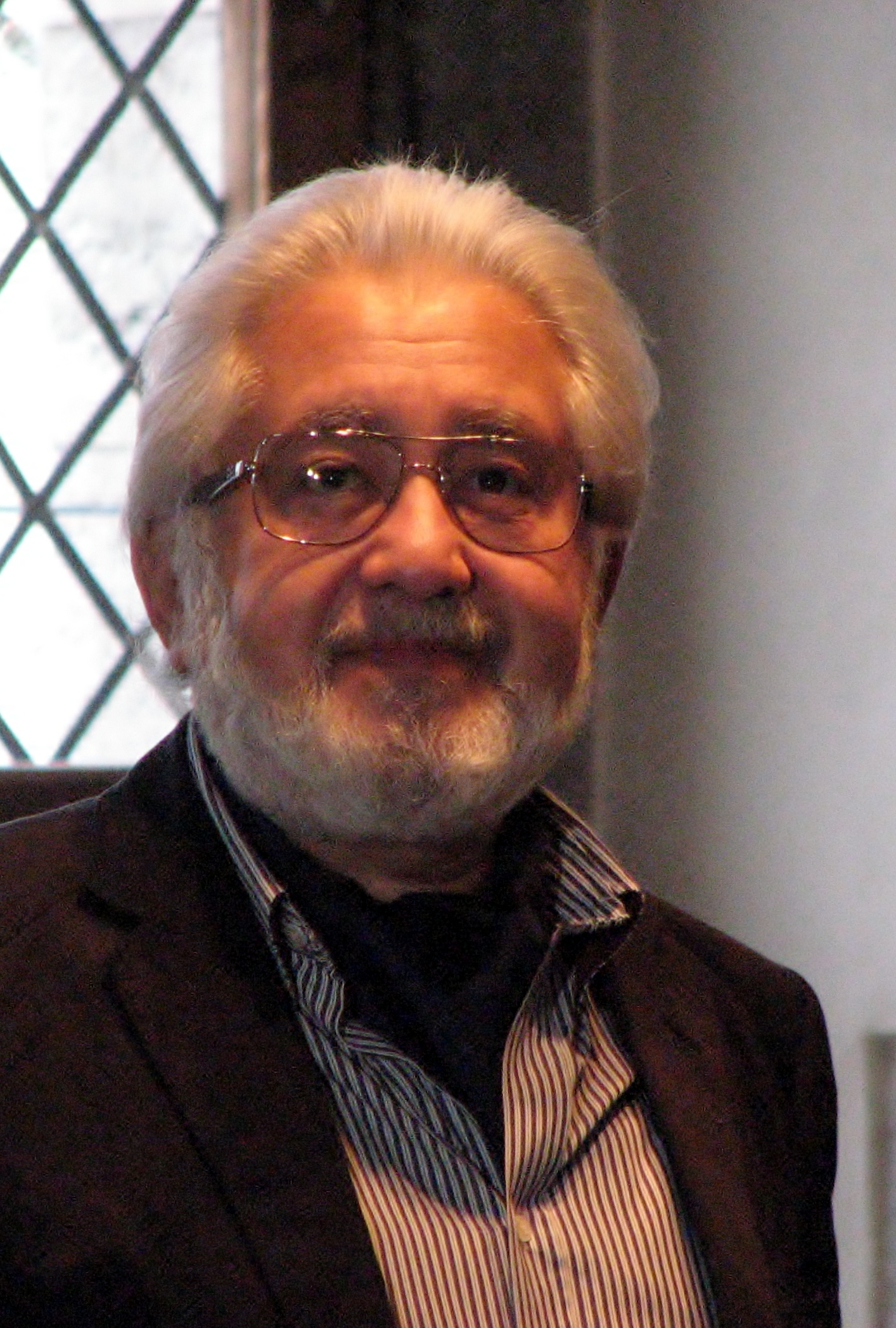
Dodin in 2012

Lev Abramovich Dodin (Russian: Лев Абрамович Додин, born 1944) is a Russian theater director, the leader of Saint Petersburg Maly Drama Theater.

== Biography ==
Lev Dodin was born in Stalinsk (current Novokuznetsk) in 1944. He first experienced theatrical production as a child at the Theater of Youth Creativity (1957–1962) directed by Matvey Dubrovin. Studied at Leningrad State Institute of Theatre, Music and Cinema under Boris Sohn and Georgy Tovstonogov which he graduated in 1966.

Between 1966 and 1982, he was a guest director in different theaters of Russia and abroad including Theater of Youth Creativity, Gorky Theater, MKhAT, Finnish National Theatre, Salzburg Festival, Florence Musical May festival, Milan La Scala.

In 1975, he started his work at Maly Drama Theatre. In 1982 he became the artistic director of the theatre and has led the theatre since then.

In 2012, critics praised the vocal performance of his new version of The Queen of Spades at the Opéra de la Bastille, featuring Vladimir Galouzine (Herman), Olga Guryakova (Liza),Ludovic Tézier (Yeletsky) and Larisa Diadkova (Countess). The production, set in a psychiatric hospital, has raised a number of questions.

He returned to the play The Cherry Orchard in 2014. The production was presented at the Monfort-Théâtre in Paris.

Among Dodin' major works are:

- Brothers and Sisters by Fyodor Abramov - a monumental show more than 8 hours long;
- The House by Fyodor Abramov
- Lord of the Flies by William Golding
- Stars in the Morning Sky by Alexander Galin
- Chevengur by Andrei Platonov
- The Devils by Fyodor Dostoevsky
- The Cherry Orchard by Anton Chekhov
- Hamlet by William Shakespeare

and many others.

After Russia invaded Ukraine in 2022, he wrote a letter to Vladimir Putin pleading to stop the war.

== Europe Theatre Prize ==
In 2000, he was awarded the VIII Europe Theatre Prize, with the following reason:

A student of one of Stanislavsky's most faithful followers, Lev Dodin left his native Siberia for the old cities of former Russia when he was very young. He has devoted his life to a teaching method that is never separated from practice, and this was his starting point for founding a company that was seen as an extended family, with a belief in ensemble performances and workshops, even before he was called upon to direct the Maly in 1983 and make it a leading theatre in the last decades of the twentieth century. The House was born as a play for his group, who graduated from the Drama School in St. Petersburg, after months spent in the northern village where Fyodor Abramov wrote his novel on the trials and tribulations of peasant life. It was adapted for the stage by using improvisation to render the actual true-to-life atmosphere to be found in Brothers and Sisters. This tragic epic of the kolkhoz, inspired by the author himself in the mid-eighties, takes place in the space of eight emotional hours of tears and laughter and plumbs the depths of the "great Russian soul", which is one of the director's favourite subjects, together with the controversial analysis of the history of his country, especially through the adaptation of novels for the theatre. The culmination of this was the staging of a Dostoevsky classic that had long been banned, The Devils, which he rehearsed for three years and was staged regularly by the Maly company for nine years in ten-hour performances of thrilling words and actions. These already imply a discourse on the revolutionary spirit of a people that serves as an introduction to the metaphor of the suicidal utopia expressed in Andrei Platonov's Chevengur, the recent stage masterpiece floating on water, and the Untitled Play by Chekhov, translated by Dodin into a dance through the twentieth century. Gaudeamus, on the contrary, is set on a snowy stage and is the first of the plays produced with the Drama School students. It is a satire on Russian training for military service that unfortunately remains very topical today, and is part of the repertoire that focuses on contemporary man, which the company offers to its public worldwide, thus restoring to us a sense of the necessity for the theatre.

== Awards and honours ==
- Honoured Worker of the Arts Industry of the RSFSR (1986)
- USSR State Prize (1986)
- Three State Prizes of the Russian Federation (25 December 1992; 5 June 2003; 9 June 2016)
- People's Artist of Russia (26 October 1993)
- Officer of the Order of Arts and Letters (France) (1994)
- Europe Theatre Prize (2000)
- Order "For Merit to the Fatherland", 4th class (9 May 2004)
- Order "For Merit to the Fatherland", 3rd class (24 March 2009)
- Order of Honour (3 February 2015)
- Golden Mask (2024)

== Bibliography ==
- Martinez, Alessandro (2005). Lev Dodin : le creuset d'un théâtre nécessaire [The melting pot of an essential theatre]. S. Gregorio di Catania: Premio Europa per il Teatro. ISBN 88-901014-2-3. OCLC 800924801.
