= Black Rose Is an Emblem of Sorrow, Red Rose Is an Emblem of Love =

1989 film

- Film poster
- Directed by: Sergei Solovyov
- Written by: Sergei Solovyov
- Produced by: Alexander Mikhailov
- Starring: Tatyana Drubich; Aleksandr Abdulov; Aleksandr Bashirov
- Cinematography: Yuri Klimenko
- Music by: Boris Grebenshchikov
- Release date: 1989
- Running time: 139 minutes
- Country: Soviet Union
- Language: Russian

Black Rose Is an Emblem of Sorrow, Red Rose Is an Emblem of Love (Russian: Чёрная роза — эмблема печали, красная роза — эмблема любви, romanized: Chyornaya roza - emblema pechali, krasnaya roza - emblema lyubvi), colloquially referred to as Black Rose (Russian: Чёрная роза, romanized: Chyornaya roza) is a 1989 Soviet comedy film directed by Sergei Solovyov. The movie intended to capture and epitomize the absurdity of the breakneck changes happening in the country at the time. It was screened in the Un Certain Regard section at the 1990 Cannes Film Festival.

== Plot ==
Set in the late Soviet period of Perestroika, the film follows the lives of two characters living in a nearly abandoned communal apartment in a building slated for demolition. Mitya Lobanov, a 15-year-old orphan and descendant of White Russian aristocracy, dreams of joining the Nakhimov Naval School. His only neighbor is Tolik Gniluga, a disillusioned and disabled dissident who brews his own moonshine and has hallucinations of historical events. Mitya regularly receives letters from a wealthy grandfather urging him to emigrate to France, but he remains in the USSR. One day, a rebellious girl named Alexandra sneaks into Mitya's room through the window. She’s been confined in the adjacent building by her father, Ilya—a high-ranking Soviet official—who disapproves of her love affair with Vladimir, a married man. Alexandra convinces Mitya to let her use his room for a rendezvous with Vladimir, leading to a series of comedic and chaotic events involving their boisterous drinking, dancing, and the bizarre involvement of Tolik.

Months later, Alexandra returns to Mitya, now pregnant and estranged from her family and Vladimir. She seeks refuge in his room again, sparking conflict when her parents and Vladimir appear, resulting in a surreal scene where everyone erupts into an absurd celebration with singing, smoking, and even an unexpected musical performance by the band Aquarium. Mitya, tired of the chaos, announces himself as the father of Alexandra's child and proposes to her, restoring order. They marry, and Mitya discovers he has inherited a substantial fortune from his grandfather, further easing tensions. Life in the apartment remains unpredictable as Tolik and Mitya’s uncle Koka become friends, but tragedy strikes when Tolik suddenly dies during a gathering, leading to a poignant funeral scene. In the epilogue, Mitya and Alexandra now have a child, and he chooses to be baptized into the Orthodox faith, celebrated by his uncle and godparents. The final scenes reveal Mitya on the barque Sedov, having realized his dream of joining the naval academy.

== Cast ==
- Tatyana Drubich as Aleksandra
- Aleksandr Abdulov as Vladimir, Aleksandra's boyfriend
- Mikhail Rozanov as Dmitry Lobanov (Mitya), Aleksandra's neighbor
- Aleksandr Bashirov as Anatoly Feoktistovich (Tolik) Gnilyuga, Mitya's neighbor
- Ilya Ivanov as Nikolai Plevakin (uncle Koka)
- Aleksandr Zbruyev as Ilya, Aleksandra's father
- Lyudmila Savelyeva as Aleksandra's mother
- Mikhail Danilov as Vladimir's father-in-law
- Assam Kuiyatte as African
- Yuri Shumilo as General Brezhnev
- Georgy Saakyan as Stalin
- Boris Grebenshchikov as Captain of "Ship of Freaks"
- Sergei Solovyov as cameo
