= Nikolai Vasilievich Demidov =

Russian and Soviet actor and theatre director

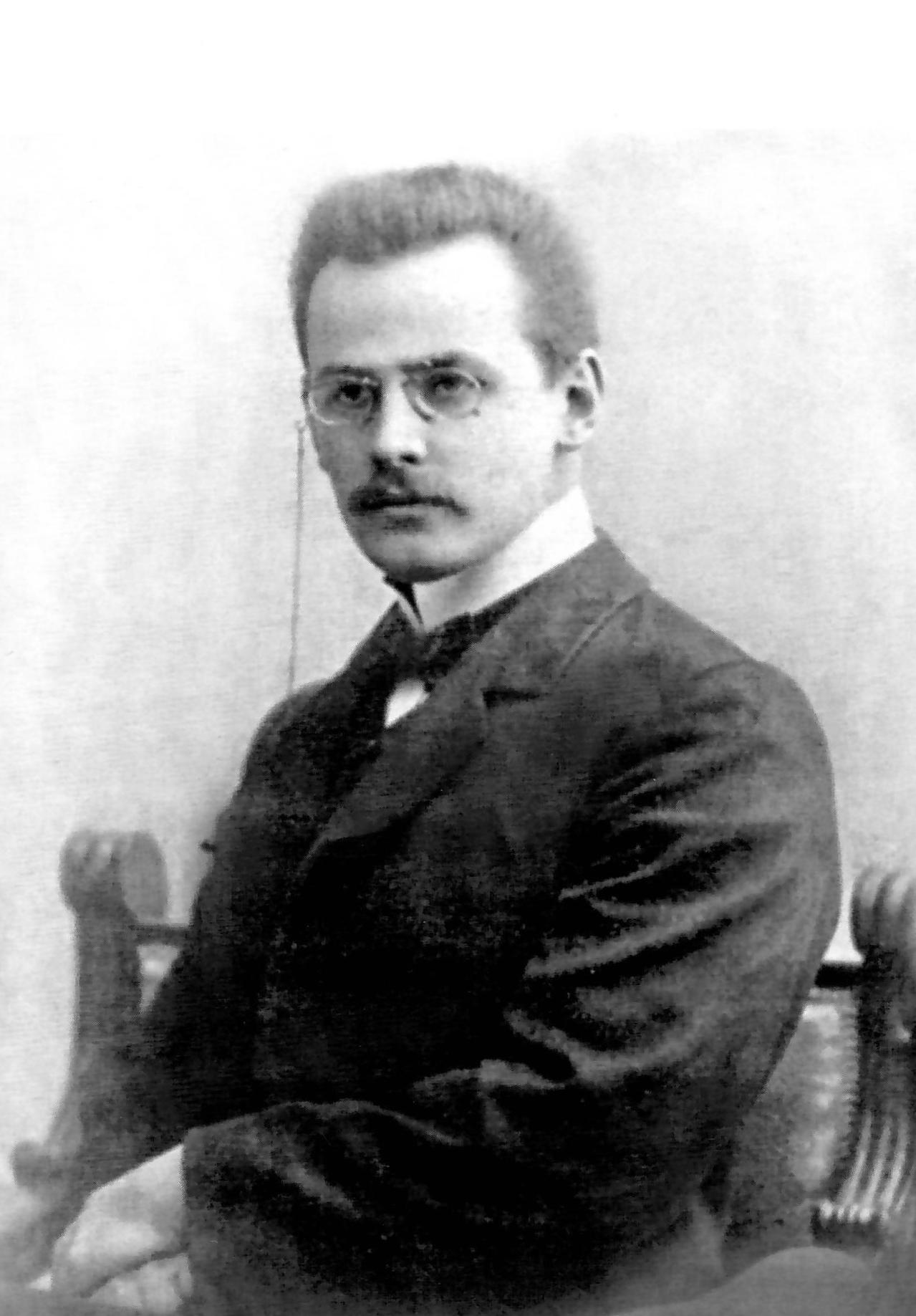
- Born: November 25, 1884; Ivanovo, Russian Empire
- Died: September 8, 1953 (aged 68); Moscow, Russian SFSR, Soviet Union
- Education: Imperial Moscow University
- Occupations: Actor; Theatre director Theatre theorist
- Known for: Creator of the System for Practical Pedagogy of Acting

Nikolai Demidov (Russian: Николай Васильевич Демидов; 1884–1953) was a Russian theatre practitioner. He was one of the first three teachers of the Stanislavski's system, trained and officially recognized by Konstantin Stanislavski.

== Biography ==
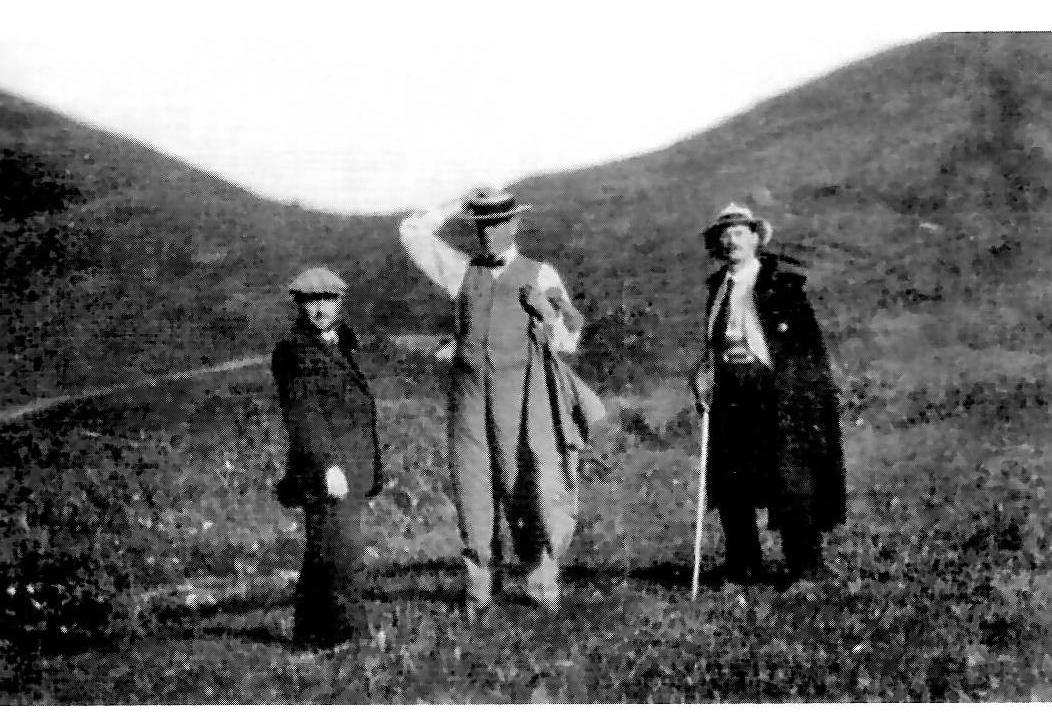
From left to right: Leopold Sulerzhitsky, Konstantin Stanislavsky, Nikolai Demidov on a walk in the foothills of the Caucasus. Kislovodsk (1910)

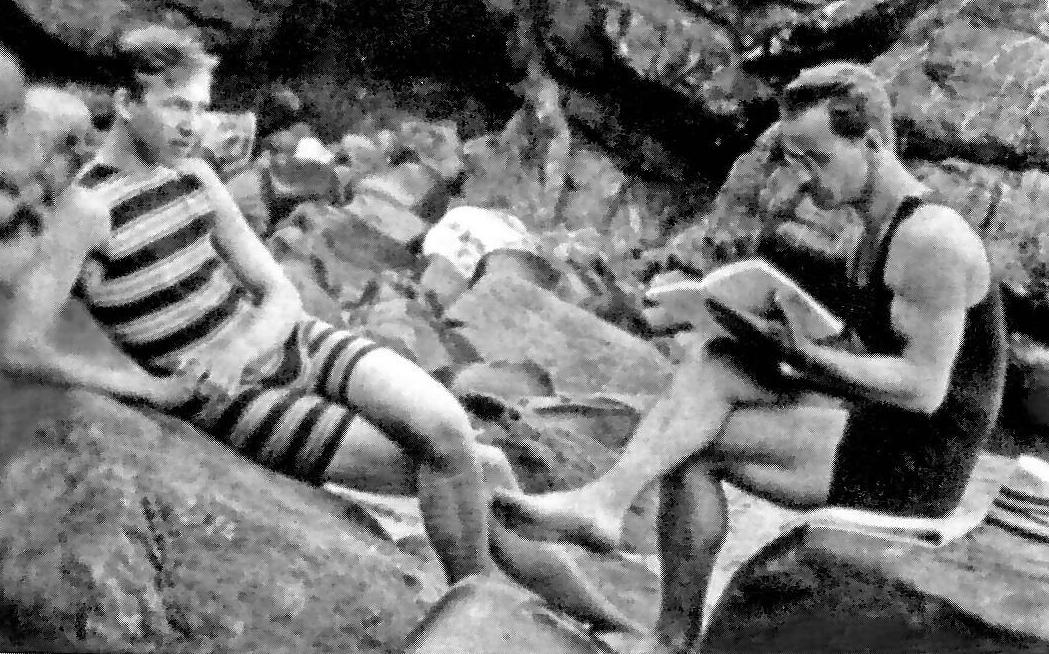
Igor Konstantinovich Alekseev (son of Konstantin Stanislavsky) and Nikolai Demidov, as his tutor, in Brittany (1911)

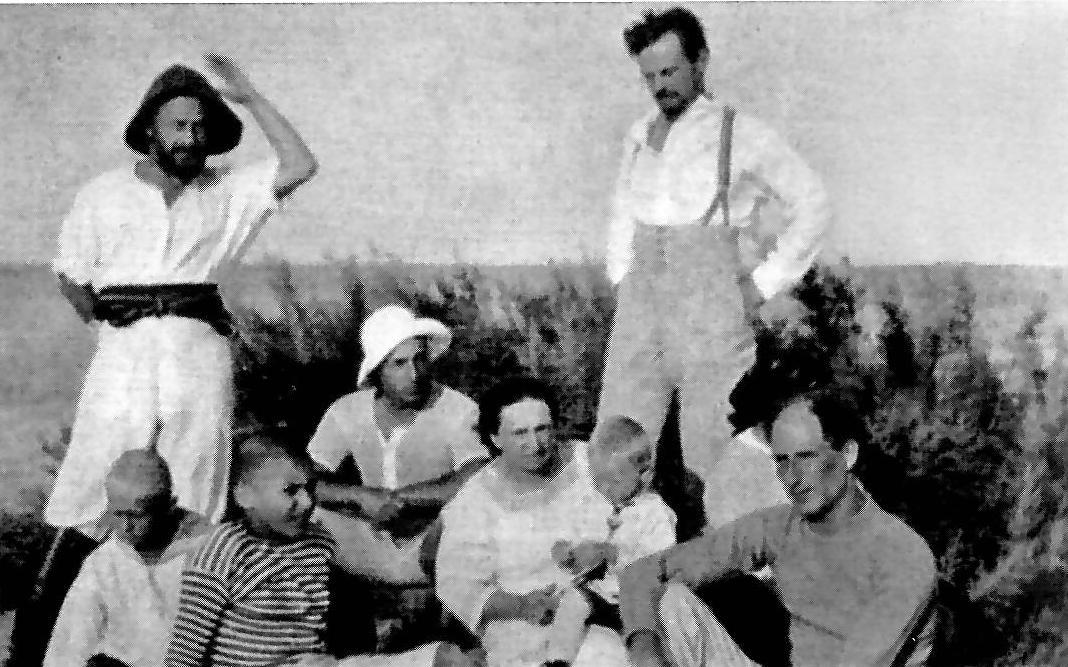
Standing: Leopold Sulerzhitsky, Nikolai Demidov (right). Sitting (in the background in a hat) — Evgeny Vakhtangov, in the center (with children) — Olga Pol, wife of Sulerzhitsky. Evpatoria. (1914 or 1915)

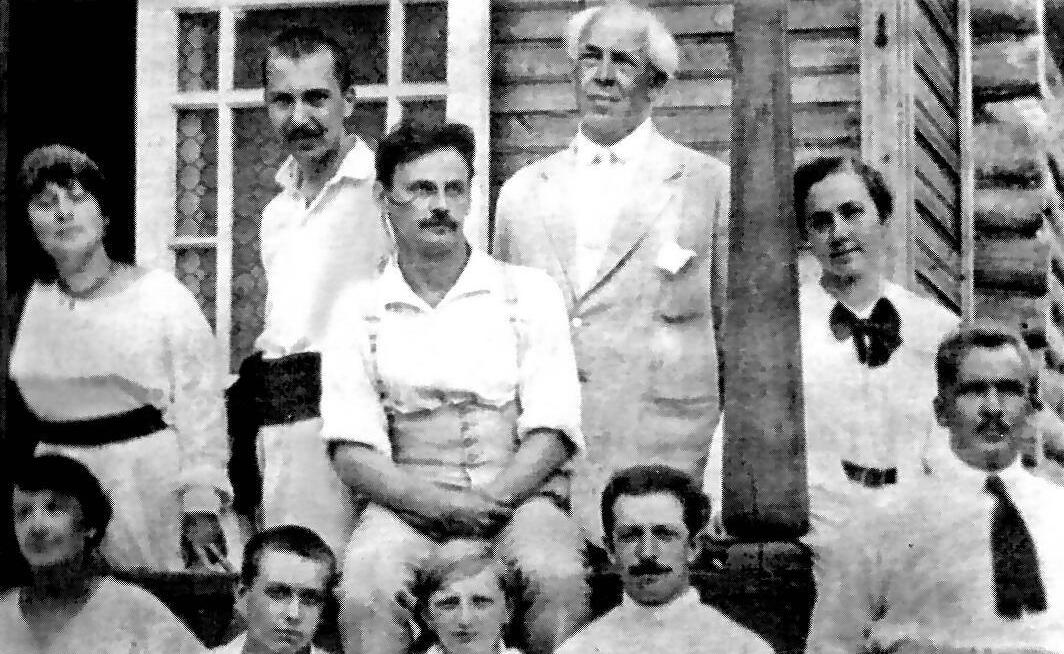
Nikolai Demidov (center) with the Stanislavsky family. To the left of Demidov — the son of Stanislavsky Igor Konstantinovich, to the right — Konstantin Stanislavsky and his daughter, Kira. Far left - the wife of Nikolai Efros, actress Nadezhda Smirnova. In the first row on the far left is Maria Lilina, Stanislavsky's wife. Saffronovo (summer 1917)

Nikolai Demidov got his first professional experience as a theater actor and director at the People's Theater at the Ivanovo Sobriety Society, created by his father. In this theater, my father was not only the founder, but also a playwright, director and actor. The plays written by him from folk life were published, played at theaters and approved by Ostrovsky himself. Vasily Viktorovich did not have a special education; he was a nugget. He did a lot for the development and cultural education of his native city. Demidov Street in the city of Ivanovo is named in his honor.

Nikolai Vasilievich was the youngest child in the family. He was weak and sickly. A serious illness, which the doctors could not cope with, promised the boy an invalid existence and a slow extinction. In this state, when doctors even forbade him to study, Nikolai took two pistols and, pressing one to his heart, the other to his temple, simultaneously pulled the triggers. One bullet went through the heart, the second into the temple, pierced the bone and got stuck. Demidov did not die, but having decided to live, he made every effort to return to an active and full life. He healed himself, inventing special gymnastics. This gives incredible results: sports health, education in the gymnasium and admission to the university (1907). At the age of 20, he created a branch of the St. Petersburg Sports Society in Ivanovo, for which he developed and successfully applied his program of individual physical and moral training of athletes. In 1913 he graduated from the medical faculty of the Imperial Moscow University. After graduating from the university, he began to practice at the Moscow clinic of Pletnev, specializing in Psychiatry, Yoga and Homeopathy. The famous doctor Peter Badmayev introduced Demidov to Tibetan Medicine. It was Demidov who contributed to the penetration of the principles of yoga into the teachings of Stanislavsky.

Friendship with Leopold Sulerzhitsky led to Demidov's acquaintance with Konstantin Stanislavsky, which grew into close cooperation that lasted more than 30 years. For many years Demidov was the educator and mentor of Igor, Stanislavsky's son, visited the house almost every day, accompanied his family on summer trips.

Since 1911 (while still a student at the university), Demidov began to attend the classes and rehearsals of Konstantin Stanislavsky at the Moscow Art Theater, starting to work together as an assistant for working with actors. Since 1919, at the insistence of Stanislavsky, Demidov left the medical profession, devoting himself entirely to the theater.

Since 1920, Demidov has taught the Stanislavsky System at the Bolshoi Theatre Opera Studio, directed by Stanislavsky. Helped Stanislavsky in the preparation of the play «Eugene Onegin».

In 1921, he organized the 4th studio of the Moscow Art Theater (in 1925, the 4th studio of the Moscow Art Theater was transformed into the Realistic Theater, and Demidov left it). In 1922-1925, he was in charge of the Drama School of the Art Theater. There Demidov discovered that the idea of dividing the creative process of acting into elements, as it was meant by the Stanislavsky system, was not fruitful, and started looking for the different approach to acting. His main idea was to find ways to integrate an actor into the creative process on a whole.

Subsequently, Demidov worked as a director and teacher at the Opera House. K.S. Stanislavsky, st. I. Nemirovich-Danchenko, and in the late 1920s - at the Moscow State Conservatory and in the studio of the Moscow Chamber Theater.

In 1934 Stanislavsky invited Demidov as editor to work on the book «Actor Prepares». In the preface to the book Stanislavsky expresses his sincere gratitude to Demidov.

I have known Nikolai Vasilyevich Demidov for 15 years. He is a man full of true love for art and an unselfish enthusiast. From the moment we met, he was so carried away by the theater and, in particular, the inner (spiritual) technique of playing, that he completely devoted himself to art. All the while, he helped me develop this tricky and complex question about acting. At the moment, I think, this is one of the few who theoretically and practically knows the "system". He spent four years in my opera studio as a director and teacher. For two years he headed the School of the Art Theater and conducted there (following Sulerzhitsky and Vakhtangov) educational work and classes on the "System"

— Konstantin Stanislavsky (1926)

After the death of Stanislavsky (1938), all approaches to the art of the actor, except for the Stanislavsky System, were recognized as wrong and harmful. The attitude towards Demidov took on "the character of persecution and persecution." Threatening accusations of "idealism", "mysticism", "lack of ideology" boiled down to far-reaching conclusions: "immediately intervene and stop such pedagogical activity." Demidov was forced to resign from all positions, and his name was completely excluded from the history of the Moscow Art Theater and the history of Russian theater studies. With the outbreak of World War II, Demidov worked in evacuation at various theaters on the territory of the USSR, having briefly returned to Moscow (1945-1946), he was soon forced to leave the capital due to incessant denunciations and persecutions. departure to Sakhalin.

In 1949, Demidov was forced to return to Moscow due to a serious illness. He suffered several heart attacks in a row, but, contrary to the forecasts of doctors, he is once again getting back on his feet. The last three years of his life, he devotes all his time to work on the book and attempts to publish it (at least partially, to edit articles, fragments). Demidov writes to Ivan Moskvin: «So, so, if there is no disaster, I will see it through to the end. I feel the same as a bullet when it shoots at a target: it can no longer stop and there is no other way».

On September 8, 1953, Nikolai Vasilievich Demidov died.

Nikolai Demidov, after Stanislavsky and Nemirovich-Danchenko, is the largest figure in Russian, Soviet theater. And, perhaps, no less large than Stanislavsky and Nemirovich

— Oleg Okulevich

== Published works of Nikolai Demidov ==
- Demidov, Nikolai (1965). The art of living on stage (in Russian). Moscow: Art. p. 383 – via Foreword by Boris Livanov and Maria Knebel.
- Demidov, Nikolai (2004). "The art of the actor in his present and future. Types of actor". Creative heritage (In 3 volumes) (in Russian). Vol. 1 (Book 1 and 2). St. Petersburg: Hyperion. p. 416. ISBN 5-89332-108-1.
- Demidov, Nikolai (2004). "The art of living on stage". Creative heritage (In 3 volumes) (in Russian). Vol. 2 (Book 3). St. Petersburg: Hyperion. p. 557. ISBN 5-89332-106-5.
- Demidov, Nikolai (2007). "The creative art process on stage". Creative heritage (In 3 volumes) (in Russian). Vol. 3 (Book 4). St. Petersburg: Hyperion. p. 475. ISBN 978-5-98187-199-3.
- Demidov, Nikolai (2009). "Theory and psychology of an actor's creativity: additions, miscellaneous, biographical materials, from correspondence". Creative heritage (In 3 volumes) (in Russian). Vol. 4 (Book 5). St. Petersburg: Hyperion. p. 653. ISBN 978-5-903368-39-6 – via Ed. Margarita Laskina.

== Bibliography ==
- Bogdanova, Lyudmila (2017). Nikolai Demidov's School of Acting (in Russian). Moscow: Publishing house GITIS. p. 209. ISBN 978-5-91328-247-7.
- Ivanova, Alisa (2017). Acting Education. Demidov's approach (in Russian). Moscow: Publishing house GITIS. p. 138. ISBN 978-5-91328-321-4.
- Shulga, Lyudmila (2 January 2017). "Pedagogical principles of Nikolai Demidov based on practical lessons in the studios of the Moscow art theater (1921-1925)" (PDF) (in Russian) (Theater issues ed.). pp. 198–208.
