= Sergei Solovyov (film director) =

Soviet and Russian filmmaker (1944–2021)

- Сергей Соловьёв
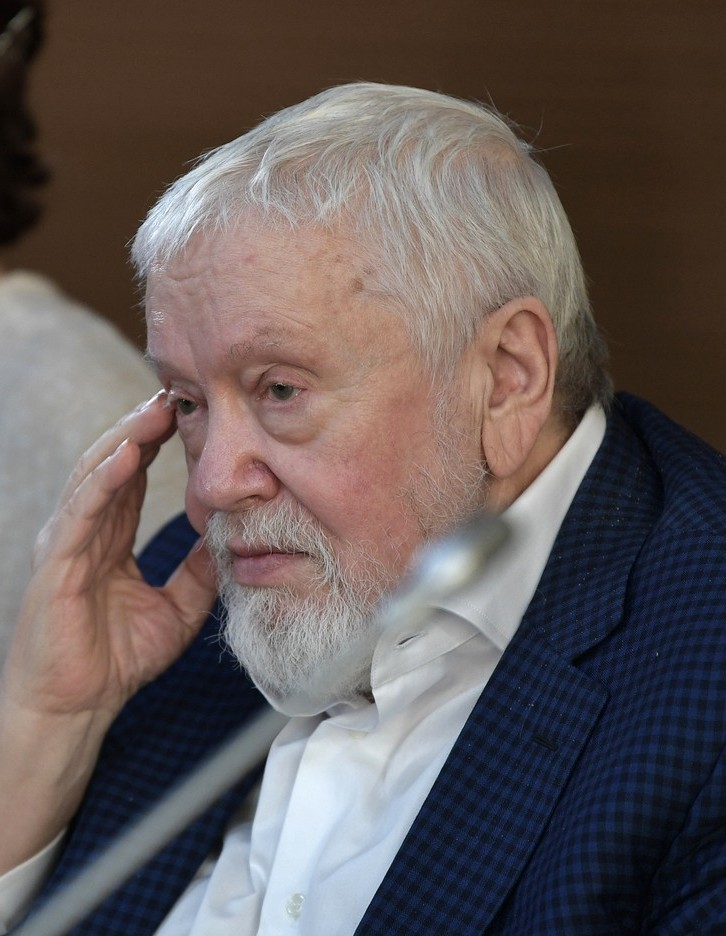
- Solovyov in 2019
- Born: 25 August 1944; Kem, Karelo-Finnish SSR, Soviet Union
- Died: 13 December 2021 (aged 77); Moscow, Russia
- Occupations: Film director; screenwriter
- Years active: 1970–2021

Sergei Alexandrovich Solovyov (Russian: Сергей Александрович Соловьёв; 25 August 1944 – 13 December 2021) was a Soviet and Russian film director, producer, screenwriter, and actor. In 1993 he was awarded the People's Artist of Russia title.

== Biography ==
Solovyov first experienced theatrical production as a child at the Theater of Youth Creativity (1957–1962), directed by Matvey Dubrovin.

He studied at all-Soviet state Institute of Cinematography, worked in Leningrad TV and Mosfilm studio (1969–1987, film director, writer, producer). In 1975, he won the Silver Bear for Best Director at the 25th Berlin International Film Festival for his film One Hundred Days After Childhood.

Solovyov contributed to the Russian rock movement of the perestroika era, with such films as Assa (1987, starring rock musicians Afrika (Sergei Bugaev), Viktor Tsoi, Sergey Ryzhenko) and Black Rose Is an Emblem of Sorrow, Red Rose Is an Emblem of Love (1989). Both Soviet films prominently feature Russian rock music in soundtracks, especially by Boris Grebenshchikov and his band Aquarium.

He directed Uncle Vanya (Maly Theatre) and The Seagull (Taganka Theatre, 1994). Solovyov was a professor of Gerasimov Institute of Cinematography and the chairman of Cinematographer's Union of Russia from 1994 to 1997. In 2000 he was a member of the jury at the 22nd Moscow International Film Festival.

Solovyov died on 13 December 2021, at the age of 77. His funeral was held at John the Apostle church in Moscow.

== Selected filmography ==
- Family Happiness (Семейное счастье, 1969)
- Yegor Bulychyov and Others (Егор Булычов и другие, 1971)
- The Stationmaster (Станционный смотритель, 1972)
- One Hundred Days After Childhood (Сто дней после детства, 1974)
- Melodies of a White Night (Мелодии белой ночи, 1976)
- The Lifeguard (Спасатель, 1980)
- Direct Heiress (Наследница по прямой, 1982)
- Wild Pigeon (Чужая белая и рябой, 1986)
- Assa (Асса, 1987)
- Black Rose Is an Emblem of Sorrow, Red Rose Is an Emblem of Love (Чёрная роза – эмблема печали, красная роза – эмблема любви, 1989)
- House under the Starry Sky (Дом под звёздным небом, 1991)
- Tender Age (Нежный возраст, 2000)
- 2-Assa-2 (Асса-2, 2008), a sequel to Assa
- Anna Karenina (Анна Каренина, 2009)
- Ducky-Ducky-Ducky (Ути-ути-ути, 2020)
