= Matvey Dubrovin =

Russian theater director

- Матвей Дубровин
- Born: July 12, 1911; Saratov, Russian Empire
- Died: October 22, 1974 (aged 63); Leningrad, Russian SFSR, Soviet Union
- Occupations: Theater director; educator
- Awards: Honored Cultural Worker of the RSFSR

Matvey Grigoryevich Dubrovin (Russian: Матвей Григорьевич Дубровин, IPA: [matveˈj grigoˈrjevich dubroˈvin]; July 12, 1911 – October 22, 1974) was a Soviet theatre director. He was the founder of the Theater of Youth Creativity (TYUT) in Leningrad (1956) and Honored Cultural Worker of the RSFSR. He developed the theory of integrated education of children through theatrical art. Matvey Dubrovin's method was based on education of a person through the use of theater.

Matvey Dubrovin created an educational system that teaches children by means of theatrical art. An author of various articles and methodological developments on aesthetic education, Matvey used the Theatre of Youth Creativity to educate the universe of now well-known figures of Russian theater and cinema, including Evgeny Sazonov, Lev Dodin, Sergei Solovyov, Aleksandr Galibin, Andrey Krasko.

== Biography ==
Matvey Dubrovin was born in Saratov. His father was a tailor, and he was the fourth son. In 1923, twelve year old Matvey organized a drama club in Saratov called "Revolutionary Theater" and staged his first production "Robin Hood". In the early years of 1930 Dubrovin spent time in Leningrad. For a while he studied at the Faculty of Philology of Saint Petersburg State University. Then he entered the Russian State Institute of Performing Arts to major in directing. Before the war he was an assistant director of Vsevolod Meyerhold for the production of "The Queen of Spades" in the Small State Opera House. Starting from 1939, Dubrovin helped the war effort for Russia during war. At the beginning of Finnish War he directed the propaganda team. After severe concussion he was sent to the evacuation city of Khorog, located on the "top of the world" (Pamir Mountains). There he organized the first Musical Theatre in Tajikistan. It was during this time he developed the idea of a theater in which "everyone would be happy ...", that later he embodied in TYUT.

=== Leningrad period (children's drama club) ===
After he returned to Leningrad in 1947, Dubrovin started teaching four different children's drama group centres: the House of Cinema, DK Kirov, Moika Palace, and Palace of Pioneers. Two acclaimed actresses he trained in the House of Cinema were Margarita Volodina and Lidiya Fedoseyeva-Shukshina.

=== Leningrad period (TYUT) ===
The busiest time of Anichkov Palace, came in the middle of the 1950s, during the Khrushchev thaw. In 1956, Dubrovin starts to lead Theater of Youth Creativity (main children's theater group in Leningrad), which brings together participants of all previously created, children's drama clubs. November 10, 1956 TYUT opens its season with the play by Mikhail Svetlov, After Twenty Years. Among the first students of TYUT are Evgeny Sazonov, Lev Dodin and Sergei Solovyov.

=== Matvey Dubrovin's Circle ===
Theatre School TYUT, established in 1956 was built on the principle of the Matvey Dubrovin's Circle. The typical "professional" theater of the time was managed with a defined hierarchy, where at the top were the director and the actors, and at the bottom were all of the theater's workshops: costume designers, make-up, props, and lighting. Dubrovin moved away from this model and created a Circle, where all of the theatrical professions worked cohesively towards a path to a performance, resulting in common labor of all of the participants. Each participant chose a theatrical profession according to their own taste, then trained in that profession. This way, all participants contributed to the creation of the performance. This helped keep children grounded and away from the "star" fever. It is difficult to become conceited if today you act on stage, but tomorrow you are behind the scenes helping your friends. At the head of each department stands a leader, who helps the workshop teacher. Lessons in one of the workshops are mandatory for the Studio. Thus, the participants get the skills of the theatrical professions and are prepared to work on their own TYUT performances.

== Cultural workers and students of Matvey Dubrovin ==
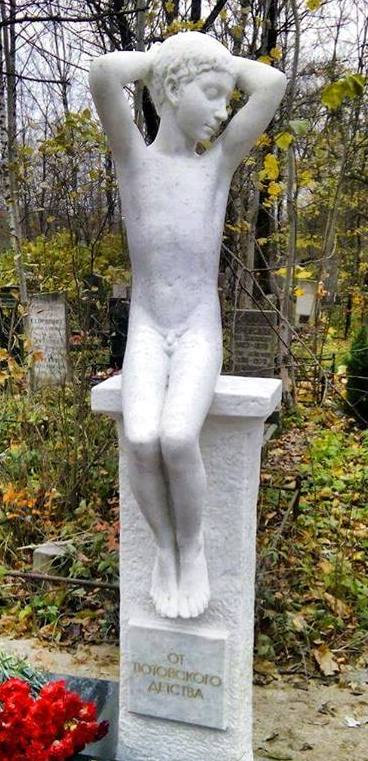
The monument at the grave of Matvey Dubrovin with the inscription «From TYUT's childhood»

Lev Dodin:

"I think his idea was bigger than professional theater by itself, or at least of the theater of that era -. He was the spirit – the prophet, the teacher in the Biblical sense of the word – Preacher" .

"Matvey Dubrovin was a terrific demiurge. Once we were working on the play " The secret is in the suitcase", with the second teacher, very smart, informative. We rehearsed it and it was very serious, but boring. Suddenly Dubrovin came in and began to disassemble the play and was able to show WHAT that play can become. He was the boss for us, but suddenly he grabbed a chair, pulled the table, jumped up on the table, picked up the chair and began to swing it ... We rolled down with laughter. I didn't know at that time that you can like the director. But from that moment I wanted to be on top of the table and swing chairs" .

Sergei Solovyov:

"The head of the Theatre of Youth Creativity was an amazing man, – Matvey Dubrovin. He was not just the director of the theater, he was a man who radiated tremendous energy not only for the love of the theater, but simple love to the fact that in our life there are lots of things, and that it is necessary at some point to see, to feel, so then you can and will have a different life ... I still remember the sound of his voice ... That was the first lesson of his magic" .

"Dubrovin didn't teach me anything that can be material. He did more, he brought me to life, and to the right feeling about life. After talking with Matvey Dubrovin I suddenly understood that it is very interesting to live in this world".

"He had this personal magic, magic to bring people to their senses" .

"You know, we had to deal with an extraordinarily gifted person. Once in my film "The Rescuer" was a line about the teacher: "One person's thoughts are like ripples on the water. He only needs to throw something, then you hear a small sound and then it creates ripples. And Matvey "threw it" exactly in the center, and it sent ripples. And I am amazed that they are still there" .

Nikolai Burov:

"I give a deep respect and even worship to those teachers who were in the beginning of TYUT, the names of which I'll never forget – especially, of course, about Matvei Dubrovin. Respect for the theater. That was probably the first time I realized that the theater is not only pleasure or satisfaction... – it is hard work above all. And I still think of the theater as a kind of home, which breaks the heart, but, at the same time, makes it possible to not only breathe, but to think" .

Theater teacher, director, professor, head of the department of Acting and Directing of SPbGATI, chairman of the board of theater teachers STD Russia Veniamin Filshtinsky

"Matvey determined my way of life. I followed his footsteps and chose his profession -. Teacher."

"And he (Matvey Dubrovin) and TYUT gave a lot for the St. Petersburg's and Leningrad's culture. It is impossible to imagine the city's culture of the second half of the twentieth century without Dubrovin ..."

Theater director, teacher, artistic director Theater of Youth Creativity Evgeny Sazonov:

"He opened the door into space for us. And this door was open while he was with us. What was there? The light! It was the Light".

Matvey Dubrovin died in 1974. His final resting place is in the cemetery of "Memory of victims of January 9th".

Parting words of Matvey Dubrovin to Theater of Youth Creativity:
' Dear TYUT! '
'I invented the idea of the theater, where a high work combined with creative manual labor. On the basis of it are amazing friendly relationships between people, that work for a common cause. '
'The public and private lives become one for each TYUTovets. It teaches us to be needed by people! This creates the happiness for everyone in it and for our surrounding. I created a theater for you, for a Soviet society, for communism, '.
'I did not have time to bring it to perfection, but I aspired to do it.'

== Dubrovin's Performances ==
Mikhail Svetlov 20 YEARS LATER
Jozef Princev ON THE HAPPY STREET
Viktor Rozov HER FRIENDS
Valentin Lyubimov A DANGEROUS LINE
Scenario TYUT IT HAS HAPPENED IN MYULLYUPELTO
Gleb Abakumov YOUNG BUGLER
Scenario TYUT ROAD TO KOROBITSINO
Rudolf Katz, Evgeny Sazonov LONG-DISTANCE TRAIN
Evgeny Schwartz THE SNOW QUEEN
Rudolf Katz, Evgeny Sazonov THREE SWORDS FOR THE THREE
Matvey Dubrovin AN UNEXPECTED TURN
Maxim Gorky OLD MAN
Andrei Kuznetsov MOSCOW VACATION

== Literature ==
- Evgeny Sazonov. Masters City: Experience of Theater of Youth Creativity of Leningrad the Order of the Red Banner of the Palace of Pioneers. Zhdanov» – Moscow: Education, 1984.
- Matvey Dubrovin. Theatre Kids Reality and Subject, 2002, No. 4, p. 7–9.
- Matvey Dubrovin. Unwritten book Reality and Subject, 2002, No. 4, p. 12–16.
- Theatre of Teenagers Creativity – Teaching magazine Perspective number 25, St.Petersburg: SEI SPbGDTYu 2006. – 76 p. – ISBN 5-88494-061-0
- In the circle of Matvey Dubrovin / comp. Evgeny Sazonov. – St.Petersburg: Balt. Seasons, 2006 -. 207 p .: silt, PORTRAIT.
- Igor Cohn. The boy – the man's father» (Chapter 8) – Moscow: Time, 2009. – 704 p. – ISBN 978-5-9691-0469-3.
- Matvey Dubrovin. Expressio. Strokes to the portrait: the album. the centenary of the birth of Matvey Dubrovin, founder of Theatre of the young man. Creativity (TYUT) at Leningrad. Palace of Pioneers / avt.-status. Evgeny Sazonov, Vladimir Khaunin. – St.Petersburg: Ultra Print 2011 – ISBN 978-5-905218-04-0.

== Death ==
Dubrovin died in Leningrad on 22 October 1974. He was 63.
