= 25th Berlin International Film Festival =

1975 film festival in West Berlin, Germany

- Festival poster
- Location: West Berlin, Germany
- Founded: 1951
- Awards: Golden Bear: Adoption
- Festival date: 27 June–8 July 1975
- Website: Website

Berlin International Film Festival chronology
- 26th 24th

The 25th annual Berlin International Film Festival was held from 27 June – 8 July 1975.

The Golden Bear was awarded to Adoption directed by Márta Mészáros. The retrospective dedicated to Greta Garbo was shown at the festival.

== Jury ==
The following people were announced as being on the jury for the festival:

=== Main Competition ===
- Sylvia Syms, British actress - Jury President
- Ottokar Runze, West-German filmmaker and producer
- Henry Chapier, French filmmaker and film critic
- Else Goelz, West-German journalist
- Albert J. Johnson, American film critic
- Rostislav Yurenev, Soviet film critic
- João Carlos Martins, Brazilian pianist and conductor
- Sukhdev Sandhu, Indian filmmaker

== Official Sections ==
=== Main Competition ===
The following films were in competition for the Golden Bear award:

English title	Original title	Director(s)	Production Country
Adoption	Örökbefogadás	Márta Mészáros	Hungary
Ante Up	Il piatto piange	Paolo Nuzzi	Italy
A Woman's Decision	Bilans kwartalny	Krzysztof Zanussi	Poland
Comedie fantastica		Ion Popescu-Gopo	Romania
The Common Man	Dupont Lajoie	Yves Boisset	France
Far from Home	در غربت	Sohrab Shahid-Saless	Iran
The First Time on the Grass	La prima volta sull'erba	Gianluigi Calderone	Italy
Gangsterfilmen		Lars G. Thelestam	Sweden
The Great House	La casa grande	Francisco Rodríguez Fernández	Spain
Ice Age	Eiszeit	Peter Zadek	West Germany
Jacob the Liar	Jakob der Lügner	Frank Beyer	East Germany
John Glückstadt		Ulf Miehe	West Germany
Leave Us Alone	La' os være	Lasse Nielsen and Ernst Johansen	Denmark
Lily, aime-moi		Maurice Dugowson	France
Love and Death		Woody Allen	United States
One Hundred Days After Childhood	Сто дней после детства	Sergei Solovyov	Soviet Union
Out of Season		Alan Bridges	United Kingdom
Overlord		Stuart Cooper	United Kingdom
Posse		Kirk Douglas	United States
Samna	सामना	Jabbar Patel	India
Sandakan No. 8	サンダカン八番娼館 望郷	Kei Kumai	Japan
SSS		Václav Bedřich	Czechoslovakia
Strast		Aleksandar Ilić	Yugoslavia
Who Looks for Gold?	Kdo hledá zlaté dno	Jiří Menzel	Czechoslovakia
Zwaarmoedige verhalen voor bij de centrale verwarming		Nouchka van Brakel, Ernie Damen and Bas van der Lecq	Netherlands

=== Out of competition ===
- Portrait of Fidel, directed by Gina Lollobrigida (Italy)
- Salmonico (יהיה טוב סלומוניקו), directed by Alfred Steinhardt (Israel)

== Official Awards ==
The following prizes were awarded by the Jury:

- Golden Bear: Adoption by Márta Mészáros
- Silver Bear – Special Jury Prize:
  - The Common Man by Yves Boisset
  - Overlord by Stuart Cooper
- Silver Bear for Best Director: Sergei Solovyov for One Hundred Days After Childhood
- Silver Bear for Best Actress: Kinuyo Tanaka for Sandakan No. 8
- Silver Bear for Best Actor: Vlastimil Brodský for Jacob the Liar
- Silver Bear for an outstanding artistic contribution: Woody Allen for Love and Death

== Independent Awards ==
=== FIPRESCI Award ===
- Far from Home by Sohrab Shahid-Saless
