= Aleksandr Burov =

Russian footballer

Personal information
- Full name: Aleksandr Gennadyevich Burov
- Date of birth: 2 December 1975 (age 50)
- Place of birth: Moscow, Russian SFSR
- Height: 1.75 m (5 ft 9 in)
- Position: Defender

Youth career
- SDYuSShOR-63 Smena Moscow

Senior career*
Years	Team	Apps	(Gls)
1994–1995	FC Spartak-molodyozhnaya Moscow		
1996–1998	FC Spartak Moscow	0	(0)
1996	→ FC Spartak-d Moscow	32	(1)
1997	→ FC Tyumen (loan)	20	(0)
1998	→ FC Spartak-d Moscow (loan)	16	(1)
1998	FC Anzhi Makhachkala	18	(0)
1999	FC Arsenal Tula	39	(1)
2000	FC Khimki	23	(0)
2001	FC Arsenal Tula	24	(2)
2002	FC Mostransgaz Gazoprovod	36	(1)
2003–2005	FC Arsenal Tula	79	(0)
2006	FC SKA-Energiya Khabarovsk	13	(0)
2008	FC Rubin-2 Kazan	14	(0)
2008	FC MVD Rossii Moscow	16	(0)
2009	FC MVD Rossii-2 Moscow		
2010	FC Petrovka, 38 Moscow		
- * Club domestic league appearances and goals

Aleksandr Gennadyevich Burov (Russian: Александр Геннадьевич Буров; born 2 December 1975) is a former Russian football player.
