= Roman Trakhtenberg =

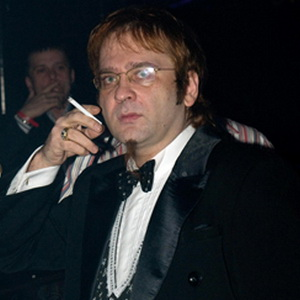
- Born: Roman Lvovich Gorbunov; 28 September 1968; Leningrad, Soviet Union
- Died: 20 November 2009 (aged 41); Moscow, Russia
- Occupation: Television/Radio personality
- Years active: 1989–2009

Roman Lvovich Trakhtenberg (real surname is Gorbunov, Russian: Роман Львович Трахтенберг; 28 September 1968, in Leningrad, USSR – 20 November 2009, in Moscow, Russia) was a Russian radio host and actor.

== Biography ==
Roman Gorbunov (Trakhtenberg) got his first acting experience in Theater of Youth Creativity (1980-1982).

In addition to being a popular radio show host, Roman Trakhtenberg has film credits to his name including Dom Kuvyrkom in 2009 and a TV mini-series called Gaishniki, where he played Sher-Khan in 2008.

He died at the age of 41 on 20 November 2009, reportedly due to a heart attack after ending his live broadcast on Radio Mayak. He is survived by his wife and by two sons from an earlier marriage. He was buried on 24 November at the Jewish cemetery of St. Petersburg.
