= Theater of Youth Creativity =

Theater school in Leningrad, Russia

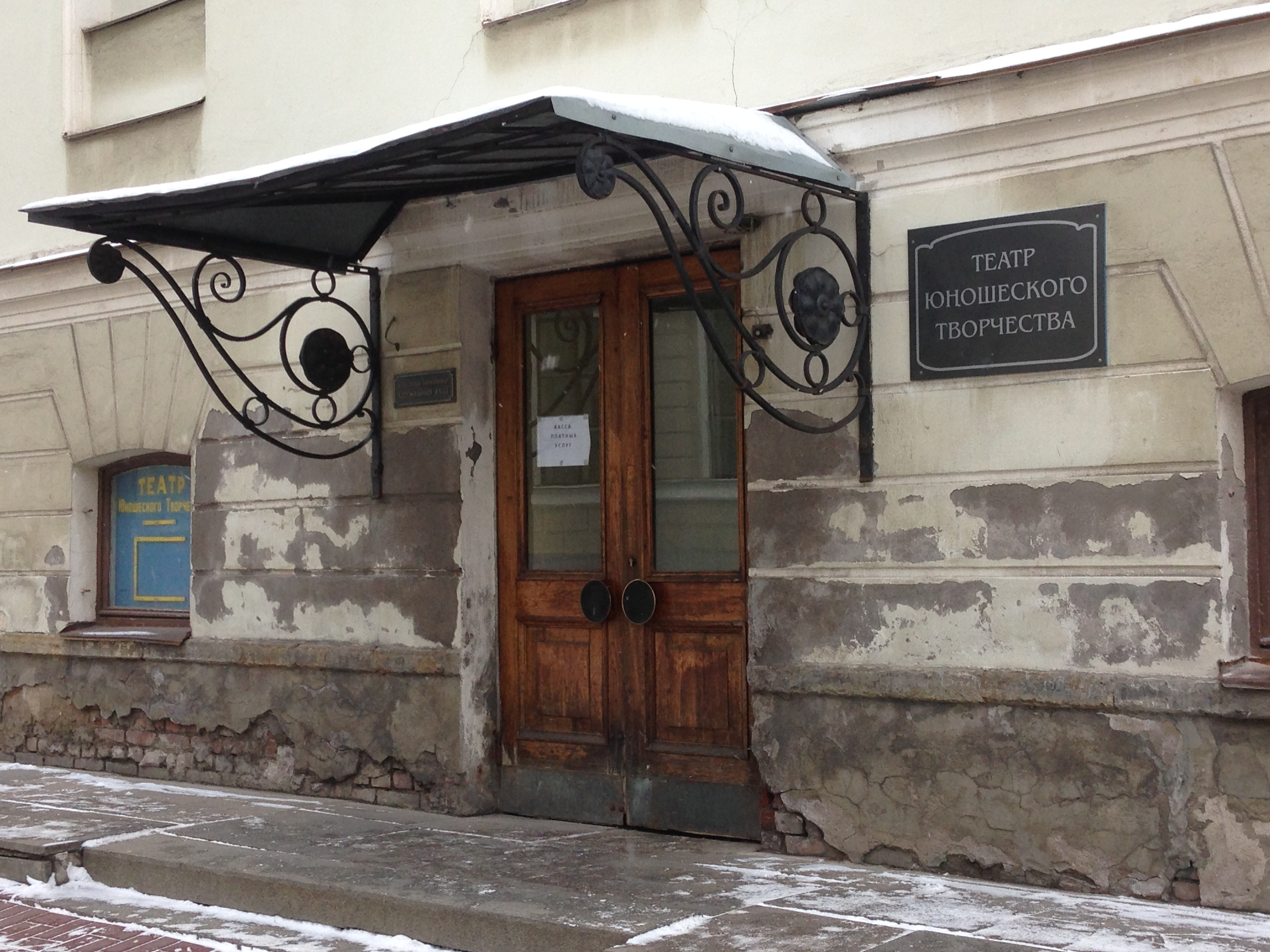
- Entrance to the Theater of Youth Creativity
- Established: 1956
- Location: Saint-Petersburg, Russia; 59.9316°N 30.3405°E
- Website: webtut.su

Theater of Youth Creativity (Russian: Театр Юношеского Творчества) (TYUT for short) - youth theatre school in Leningrad was founded by Matvey Dubrovin in 1956.

== History ==
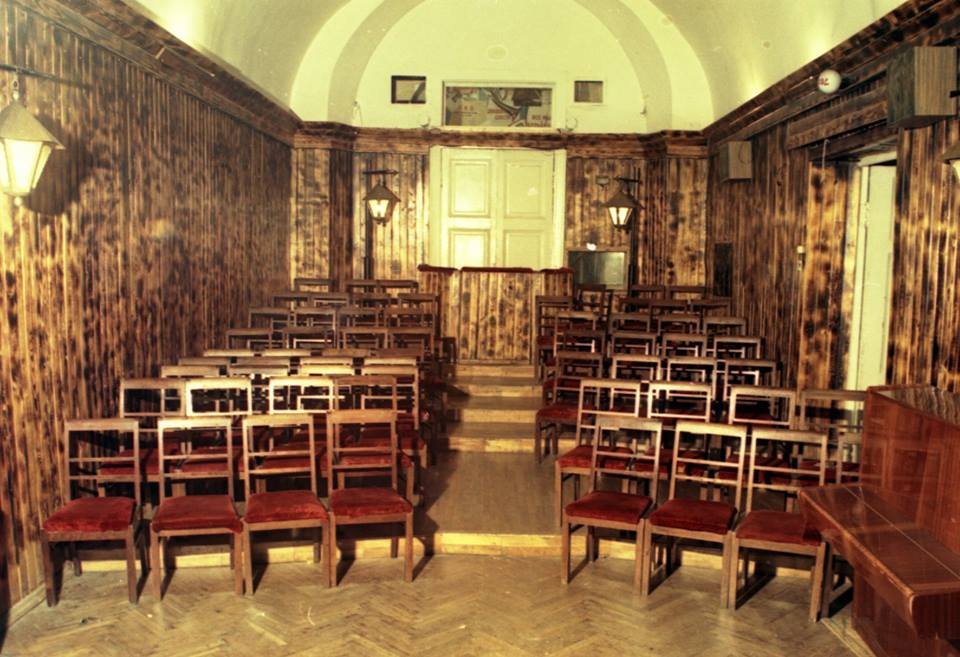
Small TYUT's stage

Theater of Youth Creativity was founded by Matvey Dubrovin (1911-1974). He has developed the theory of integrated education of the child through theatrical art. Matvey Dubrovin's method was based on education of a person as a human being through a theater.

Initially, the theater occupied small premises at the Art Department of the former Palace of Pioneers (currently Palace of Youth Creations), located in one of the Quarenghi buildings within the territory of Anichkov Palace. There they had a small TYUT's stage with 70 seats. Major productions were shown at the Folk arts Theater (13 Rubinstein St.) in Leningrad. In 1985, upon completion of the theater and concert complex TYUT got moved into the new building, to continue its work within the comfort of five floors for rehearsal and educational space, and two stages. The «big» stage though was quickly taken over by the Theater and Concert Complex (ТКК), and all of the performances took place on the small stage TYUT with 126 seats.

During his work, Matvey Dubrovin seriously studied and applied the teaching methods of Anton Makarenko. This was his way to create and maintain a «self-government» in TYUT. Children were elected to run the Board of the Theater, and they worked together with the teachers of the theater. They decided many aspects of theater life, but at the same time had to submit to the «Responsible person on duty» or Foremen appointed for different types of activities. After the death of Matvey Dubrovin in 1974, the theater continued on. Plays were produced and performed, trips to summer camp and theatrical tours stayed on schedule. All of this was possible due to the teaching staff of the theater, who consisted mainly of graduates of TYUT. It was, and still is, a succession of generations. Evgeny Sazonov, Honored Worker of Culture of Russia, became the artistic director of TYUT, as he was a student and a disciple of Matvey Dubrovin.

In 2006 TYUT celebrated its 50th anniversary. To celebrate this date TYUT's first generation students released a book The Circle of Matvey Dubrovin (St-Petersburg Baltic Seasons 2006), which has their collected memories about their teacher. Matvey Dubrovin's own book of memories about creating TYUT was never finished due to his untimely death.

In 2008, in order to preserve TYUT video archives and make them available to public, TYUT TV was created. It consists of a video hosting page with options to watch past shows on demand or via regularly scheduled programming. On April 22, 2016 Theater of Youth Creativity celebrated its 60th anniversary.

== Structure ==
Theater of Youth Creativity was built on the principle of Matvey Dubrovin Circle. In contrast to the professional theater, which was built as a hierarchical ladder, where at the top are the director and the actors, and at the bottom theater departments such as: costume designers, make-up, props, lights, etc. Matvey Dubrovin has created round table, where all the theatrical professions are equally important, and performance is the result of community labor. Each participant chooses his own theater production workshop and works in it, contributing to the creation of the performance. This arrangement, where each of the participants learns all of the aspects of theater production, largely protects the young actors from «star» disease (i.e. today you are an actor, but tomorrow you are behind the scenes, working in one of the workshops, helping your friends). Originally TYUT had 10 theatrical departments:

- Set makers
- Props creation
- Costume creation (sewing)
- Wardrobe
- Administrators
- Make up
- Lights
- Sound
- Set changers
- Director's assistants

Currently, there are also

- Woodworking
- Designer (set and costume)

Educators of the departments teach children to basics of discipline and help the chosen leaders run the department and work in the Board of the Theater. Learning one of the theatrical profession is mandatory for everyone in the Theater (no one is allowed to be just an actor). Thus, participants gain the skills of each of the theatrical profession and are prepared to work during performances.

== Rules ==
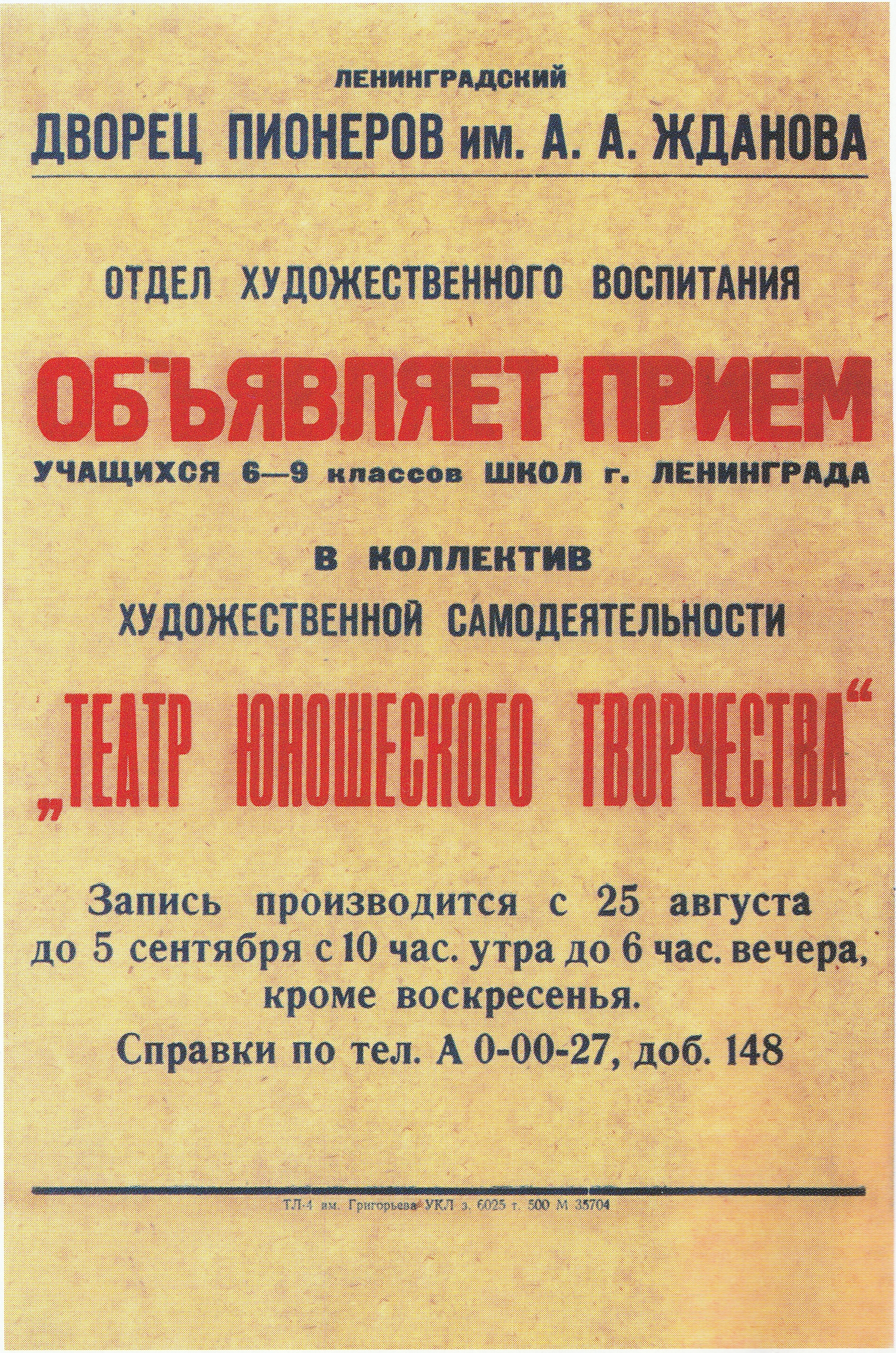
Poster for admission to TYUT

Admission to the theater is almost identical as the admission to Acting Universities. Children have to go through three selection rounds in which they need to recite a poem, a fable, and to sing a song. During the last round they may be asked to perform a small skit on a given topic. All of the rounds are watched by teachers and directors of TYUT, who also make a decision of qualification of applicant. The "new recruits" are given a tour of TYUT, which introduces them to the production workshops and the structure of the theater. Based on the knowledge each chosen applicant selects the theatrical profession that interested him the most. The signage to the list of the applicants traditionally starts in early September. Children ages 10 and above allowed to apply to the Theater and if selected can study up till the graduation from High School (about 17–18 years of age).

The first year in TYUT

The newly arrived to the Theater called students (studiets). They have yet to learn to become full participants of TYUT. The classes for them are held three times a week. Two days – Acting Studio (study), one day – Workshop Studio (study). Acting studios are divided by age, and being taught by theater directors. Children learn the basics of acting, performing skits and exercises. By the end of the year, each studio prepares a graduation acting performance, attended by their parents, teachers, and all of the other TUYT's students (TYUTovets).

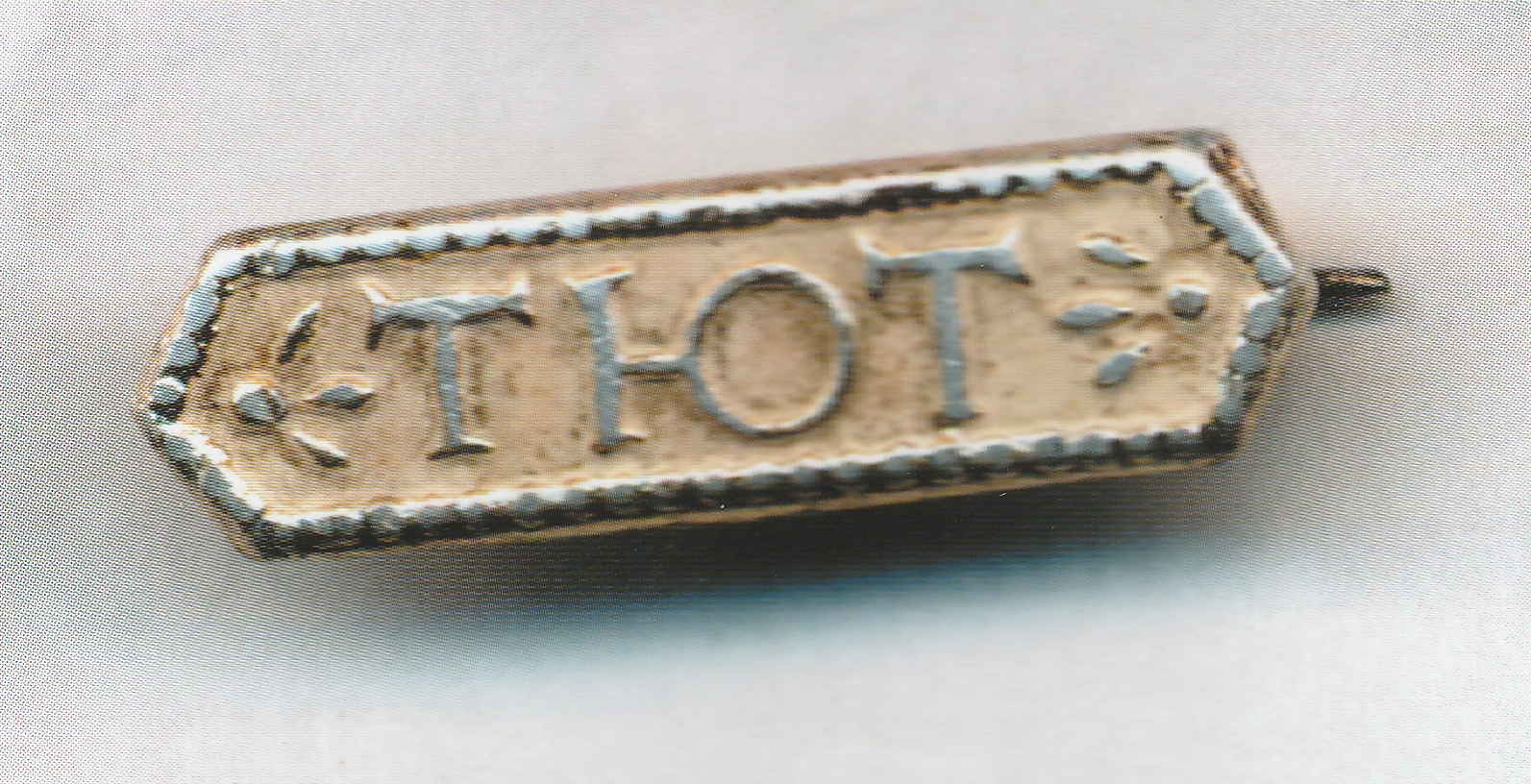
icon TYuTovtsa

In the workshops kids learn the basics of one of the theatrical professions, for which they expressed their interest after the admission to the Theater. Classes are taught by workshop's teachers. Although the in depth learning of the particular profession is not the task of the Theater, children get aspired for self-improvement. Some production facilities (Lights, sound, Director's assistants) have age limits, they take boys and girls from the age of 14. This is due to the fact that children have to learn and work on a professional theatrical equipment that can be hard for a younger child. At the end of the year Students officially renamed into TYUTovets. As a result of educational performances, children are being sorted into creative groups in which they are expected to improve their acting skills during following years, while working on a show that will later be included in the repertoire of the Theater. Also they continue their work in theatrical workshops, and are allowed to work during regular performances that are going on TYUT's stage. The study of acting and theater profession enables the child to be liberated, to get away from the routine of school lessons. This is the essence of pedagogical innovation of TYUT: Beautiful creation, related to any matter as creativity, allowing everyone to realize themselves as a person and showcase their spiritual and creative potential.

== Repertoire ==
TYUT's repertoire includes plays of foreign and domestic playwrights, as well as the ones that were written by TYUT's own students. From William Shakespeare to Anton Chekhov, and from Henrik Ibsen to Robert Sheckley.

== Graduates ==
TYUT became an artistic school for many notable figures, including: Nikolai Burov, Alexei Devotchenko, Lev Dodin, Veniamin Filshtinsky, Aleksandr Galibin, Nikolay Fomenko, Alisa Ivanova, Rudolf Katz, Andrey Krasko, Stanislav Landgraf, Olga Raevskaya, Evgeny Sazonov, Sergei Solovyov, Roman Trakhtenberg, Vladimir Vardunas

== Literature ==
- Evgeny Sazonov «City of Masters: My Experience of Theater of Youth Creativity of Leningrad Medal of the Work Red Flag of the Palace of Pioneers by the name of A.A.Zhdanov» - Moscow: Education, 1984
- Matvey Dubrovin «Kid's Theater» Reality and Subject, 2002, № 4, p. 7-9
- Matvey Dubrovin «Unwritten book» Reality and Subject, 2002, № 4, p. 12-16
- Theatre of Youth Creativity - Teaching journal «Perspective» # 25. - St. Petersburg: GOU «SPbGDTYU» 2006. - 76 p. - ISBN 5-88494-061-0
- «The Circle of Matvey Dubrovin» / edited Evgeny Sazonov. - St. Petersburg: Balt. Seasons, 2006
- Igor Kon «The Boy – Father of a Man» (Chapter 8) - Moscow: Time, 2009. - 704 p. - ISBN 978-5-9691-0469-3
- Dubrovin. Expressio. Strokes to the portrait: the album to the 100th birthday of Matvey Dubrovin, the founder of Theater of Youth Creativity (TYUT) in Leningrad's Palace of Pioneers / author/creator Evgeny Sazonov, V. Haunin - St. Petersburg: Ultra Print, 2011
- Aleksandr Galibin «I hold the dear feeling of freedom». Teacher's Newspaper, #27 (07.02.2013)
