= Mikhail Svetlov (poet) =

Soviet Russian poet (1903–1964)

Mikhail Arkadyevich Svetlov
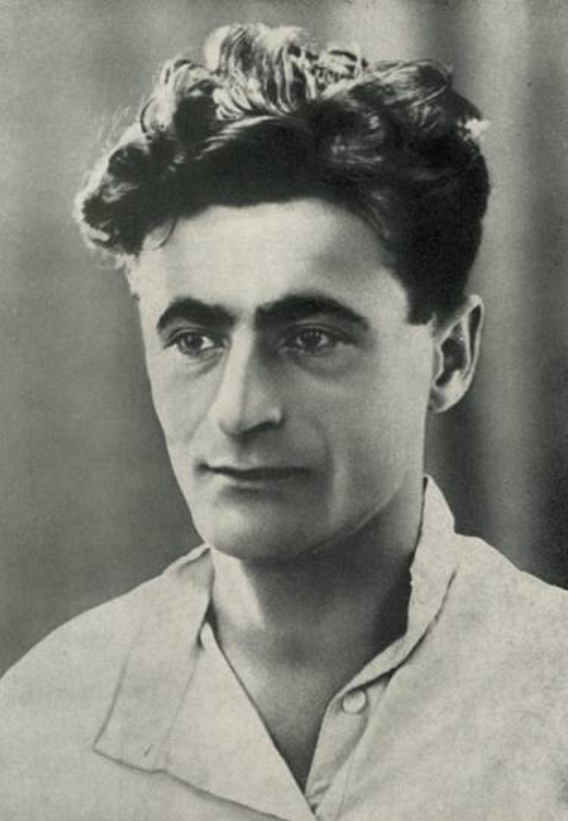
- Mikhail Svetlov in 1928
- Born: Mikhail Arkadyevich Scheinkman; 17 June 1903; Yekaterinoslav, Yekaterinoslav Governorate, Russian Empire
- Died: 28 September 1964 (aged 61); Moscow, USSR
- Occupations: poet, playwright, journalist
- Children: 1
- Writing career
- Genre: socialist realism
- Notable work: Grenada

Signature
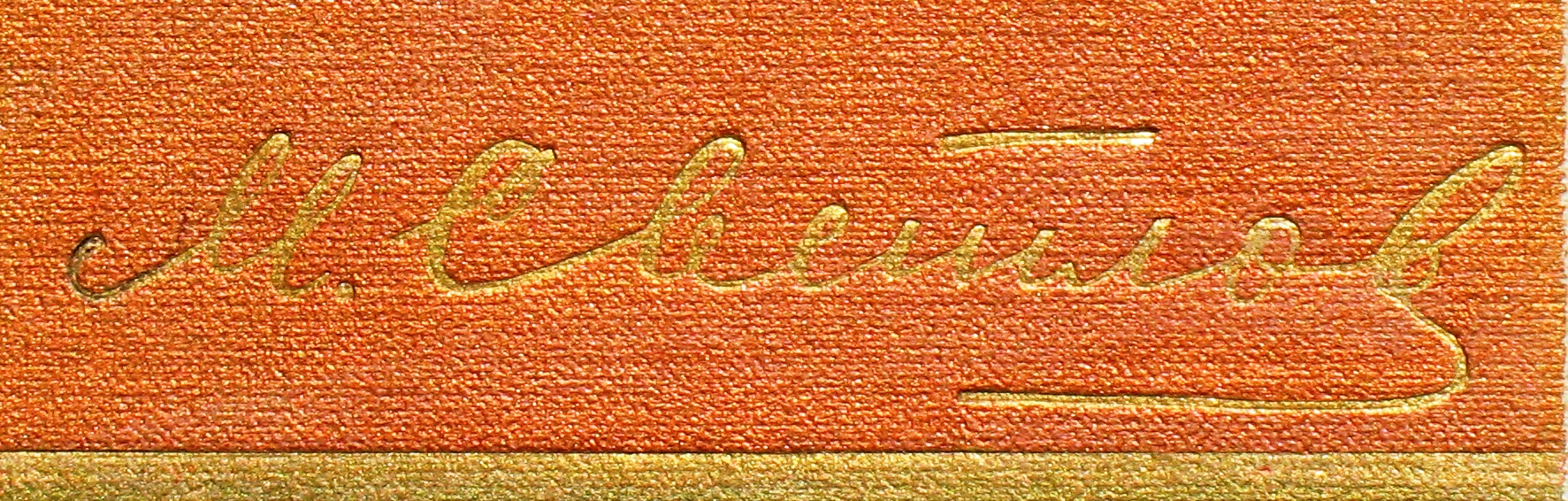

Mikhail Arkadyevich Svetlov (Russian: Михаил Аркадьевич Светлов), born Scheinkman (Russian: Шейнкман) (17 June [O.S. 4 June] 1903 – 28 September 1964) was a Russian poet and playwright. Posthumous laureate of the Lenin Prize 1967.

Figures of speech and constructions of his works sometimes resemble those of Heinrich Heine, for which he was nicknamed Red Heine, as evidenced, in particular, by Vladimir Mayakovsky's satirical poem “To the Proletarian Poets ” (Message to the Proletarian Poets, 1926).

== Biography ==
Svetlov was born into a poor Jewish family. He has been published since 1917. A member of Komsomol since 1919, Svetlov was sent to the First Congress of Proletarian Writers in Moscow in 1920 and took part in the Russian Civil War as a volunteer rifleman in the same year. Two years later, Svetlov published his first collection of poems, Rails. The main theme of his works in the 1920s was the Russian Civil War. Probably the best known poem written by Svetlov, is Grenada, published in 1926. Between 1927 and 1928 he studied at the Moscow State University.

One of Svetlov's most significant works from the 1930s was the Song of Kakhovka (1935, composer Isaak Dunayevsky), which became extremely popular among Soviet soldiers during the Second World War. After 1935 Svetlov turned to dramaturgy, publishing several plays prior to 1940 and after the war.

Between 1941 and 1945, Svetlov was a special correspondent of the Red Star at the Leningrad Front, and also worked for other Soviet front newspapers. The most notable work of that period was a monologue-style poem Italian Cross (1943), full of dreams of peace and the fraternity of nations.

After a gap of about 14 years, during which Svetlov was writing only plays, he published several collections of poems, including the Horizon (1959) and the Shooting Box (1964). He also wrote songs for the 1958 animated film Beloved Beauty (Краса ненаглядная). In 1967 he was awarded the Lenin Prize posthumously for the book Verses of the Last Years.

== Legacy ==
A minor planet 3483 Svetlov, discovered by Soviet astronomer Lyudmila Ivanovna Chernykh in 1976, is named after him.

In the Soviet-era film comedy The Diamond Arm, the male lead takes a vacation abroad (a very rare occurrence under Communist rule) on an ocean liner named in honor of Svetlov.

In December 2022 the Mikhail Svetlov street in Kyiv, Ukraine was renamed to (part of the so-called Executed Renaissance) Oleksandr Doroshkevich street.

== Partial list of poems ==
- Grenada (1926)
- Song of Kakhovka (1935)
- Italian Cross (1943)

== Bibliography ==
- Mikhail Svetlov, Selected poems, Russian texts and English translations, Moscow Raduga Publishers, 1983
