= Kino discography =

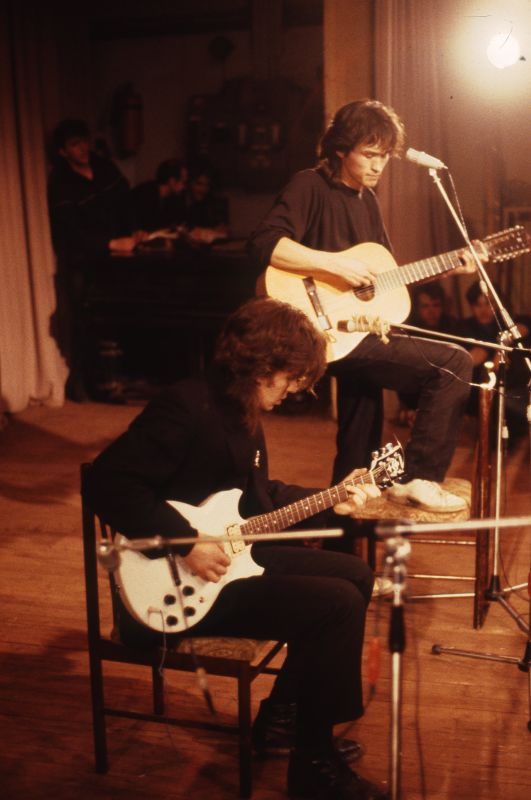
- Yuri Kasparyan (seated) and Viktor Tsoi (standing) photographed in 1987 during a concert in Leningrad
- Studio albums: 8
- Live albums: 3
- Compilation albums: 8

Kino was a Soviet rock band formed in Leningrad, Soviet Union. The original band, known as "Garin i Giperboloidy" (Garin & The Hyperboloids), after Aleksey Nikolayevich Tolstoy's novel The Hyperboloid of Engineer Garin, was formed in 1981 by Viktor Tsoi, along with Aleksei Rybin and Oleg Valinskiy. One year later they formed the group "Kino", which included Tsoi, Yuri Kasparyan, Igor Tikhomirov, and Georgiy Guryanov.

== Albums ==
=== Studio albums ===
Year	Album details	Peak chart positions	Certifications (sales thresholds)
Year	Album details	SOV*	Certifications (sales thresholds)
1982	45: Released: 1982; Label: Moroz; Format: CD		SOV: *
1984	Nachalnik Kamchatki: Released: 1984; Label: Moroz; Format: CD		SOV: *
1985	Eto ne lyubov...: Released: 1985; Label: Moroz; Format: Vinyl, CD		SOV: *
1986	Noch: Released: 1986; Label: Moroz; Format: Vinyl, CD		SOV: *
1988	Gruppa krovi: Released: 1988; Label: Moroz; Format: Vinyl, CD		SOV: *
1989	Zvezda po imeni Solntse: Released: 1989; Label: Moroz; Format: Vinyl, CD		SOV: *
1989	Posledny geroy: Released: 1989; Label: Moroz; Format: Vinyl, CD		SOV: *
1990	The Black Album: Released: 1990; Label: Moroz; Format: Vinyl, CD		SOV: *
"*": Information about the music sales and music recording certifications could not found, possibly due to copyright issues.

=== Compilations and demos ===
Year	Album details	Peak chart positions	Certifications (sales thresholds)
Year	Album details	SOV*	Certifications (sales thresholds)
1983	46: Released: 1983; Label: Moroz; Format: CD		SOV: *
1986	Red Wave: 4 Underground Bands from the USSR: Released: 1986; Label: Moroz; Format: CD		SOV: *
1989	Posledny geroy: Released: 1989; Label: Moroz; Format: CD		SOV: *
1992	The Final Recordings: Released: 1992; Label: Moroz; Format: CD		SOV: *
2001	The Greatest Hits: Released: 2001; Label: Moroz; Format: CD		SOV: *
2002	Kino in Film: Released: 2002; Label: Moroz; Format: CD		SOV: *
2002	The Story of This World: Released: 2002; Label: Moroz; Format: CD		SOV: *
2002	The Final Recordings: Released: 2002; Label: Moroz; Format: CD		SOV: *
"*": Information about the music sales and music recording certifications could not found, possibly due to copyright issues.

=== Live albums ===
Year	Album details	Peak chart positions	Certifications (sales thresholds)
Year	Album details	SOV*	Certifications (sales thresholds)
1985	Live at the Rock Club: Released: 1985; Label: Moroz; Format: CD		SOV: *
1987	Live in Dubna: Released: 1987; Label: Moroz; Format: CD		SOV: *
1988	The Acoustic Concert: Released: 1988; Label: Moroz; Format: CD		SOV: *
"*": Information about the music sales and music recording certifications could not found, possibly due to copyright issues.
