= Pop-Mekhanika =

Russian musical collective

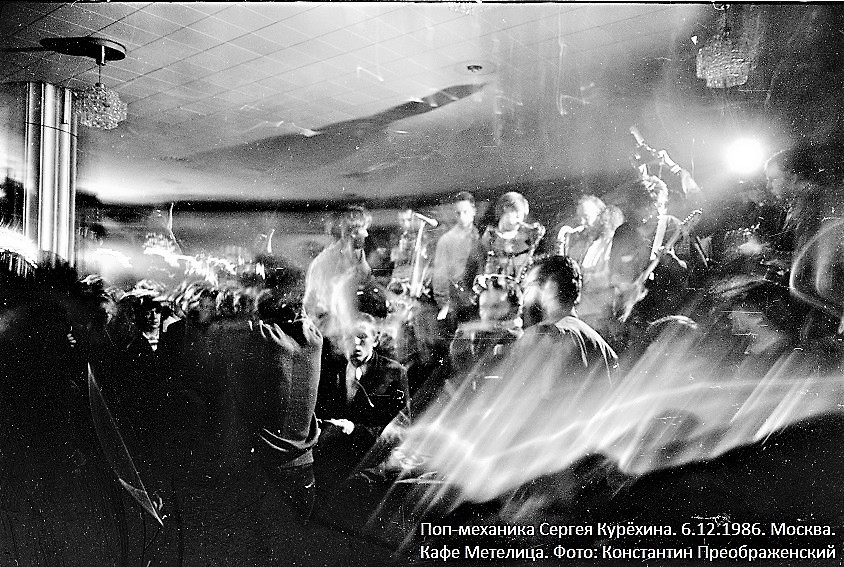
Pop-Mekhanika on stage. Moscow, 1986

Pop-Mekhanika (Populyarnaya Mekhanika) (Russian: «Поп-механика», «Популярная механика», lit. 'Pop-mechanics, Popular mechanics') was a musical collective founded by Sergey Kuryokhin in 1984. The line-up of Pop-Mekhanika often changed, with musicians from rock groups such as Aquarium, Kino, Strannye Igry, AVIA, and Auktyon took part in its performances. Pop-Mekhanika ceased to exist with Kuryokhin's death in 1996.

== History ==
Sergey Kuryokhin acted as the composer, conductor, and artistic director of Pop-Mekhanika, as well as performing as a musician. The collective's performances were partly improvised and mixed genres, including elements of jazz, rock, avant-garde theater, and ancient mystery plays. The stage performances sometimes included animals.

The orchestra's director and composer, free jazz pianist Sergei Kuryokhin, collected around 30 people on stage. Among them were all the members of Strannye Igry, Boris Grebenschikov, Viktor Tsoy and all standing members of Leningrad's bohemian artistic community. The entire crew was divided into sections—jazz (brass instruments), rock (electric guitars), folk (some kind of elongated Caucasus horns), classical (a string quartet) and 'industrial' (sheets of metal, saws, etc.).

— Artemy Troitsky, Back in the USSR : the true story of rock in Russia

The first Pop-Mekhanika concert took place on 14 April 1984 in Moscow on the stage of the Moskvorechye House of Culture. The group's first performance in Leningrad took place in the spring of 1985 at a festival of the Leningrad Rock Club.

In 1988, Pop-Mekhanika had their first international performances, including shows in Finland, Sweden, and Germany. From 1988 to 1991, the majority of Pop-Mekhanika performances took place abroad. The group was less active after 1991.

Kuryokhin's final Pop-Mekhanika show took place in Saint Petersburg in September 1995. The performance was also a fundraiser and advertisement for Aleksandr Dugin's Duma electoral campaign.

== Pop-Mekhanika participants ==
External image
- Kuryokhin and Kola Beldy on stage

With the exception of Kuryokhin, Pop-Mekhanika did not have a permanent line-up. Participants in Pop-Mekhanika shows included:

- Aleksandr Aleksandrov
- Garik Assa † — show, avant-garde fashion
- Kola Beldy — vocals
- Aleksandr Berenson — trumpet
- Vladimir Boluchevsky — saxophone
- Igor Borisov — guitar
- Sergey "Afrika" Bugayev — industrial group, electronic drums
- Igor Butman — alto saxophone
- Mikhail Chernov — saxophone
- Leonid Fyodorov — guitar
- Vsevolod Gakkel — cello
- Oleg Garkusha — maracas, industrial group, theatrics
- Boris Grebenshchikov — guitar, theatrics
- Georgy "Gustav" Guryanov † — industrial group, percussion, vocals
- Nikolay Gusev — keyboards
- Yuri Kasparyan — guitar
- Yury Kasyanik — soprano saxophone, flute, recorder
- Arkady Kirichenko — tuba, vocals
- Aleksandr Kondrashkin † — drums
- Mikhail Kordyukov † — percussion
- Elena Korikova — vocals, backing vocals
- Sergey Letov — saxophone, bass clarinet, tenor saxophone
- Yegor Letov † — bass guitar, guitar
- Aleksandr Lipnitsky
- Aleksandr Lyapin — guitar
- Vladislav Mamyshev † — performances, show
- Timur Novikov † — industrial group
- Valentina Ponomaryova
- Aleksey Rakhov — saxophone
- Arkady Shilkloper — French horn, jagdhorn
- Ivan Shumilov — crumhorn
- Grigory Sologub † — guitar, theatrics
- Viktor Sologub — bass guitar, guitar, theatrics
- Igor Tikhomirov — bass guitar
- Alexander Titov — bass guitar
- Viktor Tsoi † — guitar
- Aleksey Vishnya— guitar, sound engineer
- Aleksey Zalivalov † — viola
- Joanna Stingray

The British actress Vanessa Redgrave also took part in a Pop-Mekhanika performance.
