= Alexey Vishnya =

Russian composer (born 1964)

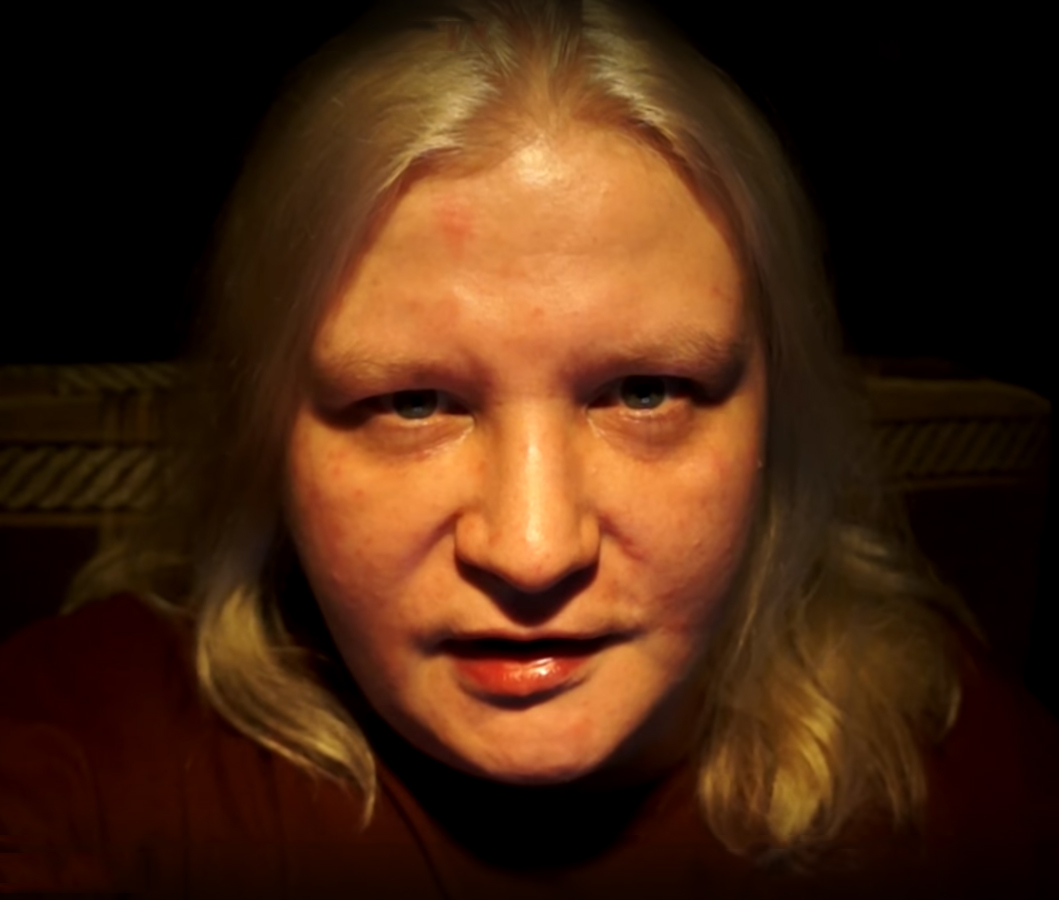
- Alexey Vishnya
- Born: Alexey Fyodorovich Vishnya; September 18, 1964 (age 60); Leningrad
- Occupation: Musician

Alexey Fyodorovich Vishnya (Russian: Алексе́й Фёдорович Ви́шня; September 18, 1964, in Leningrad) is a musician, vocalist, poet, songwriter and sound engineer.

Alexey Vishnya was born in Leningrad. His parents from the late 1950s to the early 1960s worked in Latin America, from where they brought an extensive collection of records, and later encouraged their son's passion for music by buying him equipment.

At the age of 12, Vishnya became interested in cinema, as a result of which he enrolled in courses for projectionists and photojournalists at the House of Technology and Career Guidance, while attending an acoustics and sound recording circle, whose teacher was Andrei Tropillo in the spring of 1980. He made his debut as an independent sound engineer under the supervision of Tropillo at the turn of the 80s. He assisted Tropillo and Boris Grebenshchikov on the recording of the album 45.

== Discography ==
=== Solo releases ===
- 1984 — Last Album
- 1987 — Heart
- 1989 — Dancing on Broken Glass
- 1991 — Illusions
- 1998 — Sailor's Dream
- 2000 — Alexey Vishnya feat. Irie
- 2003 — Viagra for Putin
- 2003 — Politekhno
- 2004 — Million Against
- 2004 — Reboot
- 2014 — Cherry Kino

=== DK ===
- 1988 — Unforgivable Forgetfulness

=== Alexander Bashlachev ===
- 1985 — Third Capital

=== Kino ===
- 1983 — 46
- 1985 — Eto ne lyubov...
- 1986 — Love is Not a Joke (published in 2020)
- 1988 — Gruppa krovi

=== AVIA ===
- 1986 — The Life and Work of the Composer Zudov

=== Mify ===
- 1987 — Mythology
- 1988 — Madison Street
- 1989 — Bay, the Bell!!!
