= Posledny geroy =

Posledny geroy may refer to:

- Posledny geroy (album), a 1989 studio album by the Russian rock band Kino
- "Posledny geroy" (song), a 1984 song by the Russian rock band Kino
