= Noch (album) =

Studio album by Kino
- Released: 1986
- Genre: Post-punk, new wave, pop rock, indie-rock, punk rock, dance punk
- Length: 43:11
- Label: AnTrop; Melodiya (1988 release); Moroz Records (1994 reissue)
- Producer: Andrei Tropillo

Kino chronology
Eto ne lyubov... (1985)	Noch (1986)	Gruppa krovi (1988)

Melodiya release
- 1988 release

Noch (Russian: Ночь, lit. 'Night') is the fourth studio album by Soviet rock band Kino, released in 1986. It is the group's first official album release.

The original release was via cassettes and Andrei Tropillo released the album on magnitizdat. In 1988, the album was issued on vinyl by Melodiya without the group's permission, which angered the group. Viktor Tsoi criticized the release of the album, saying that they release material without the consent of the author, and also do the design as they wished. The disc was released without the knowledge of the musicians themselves; however, it sold over two million copies, making the group popular throughout the Soviet Union. The song "Anarchy" had a subtitle - "A Parody of Western Punk Bands." Later, it was changed to Mother Anarchy with no subtitling. According to the editor of the issue, N. Baranovskaya, this was done in order to be approved by the Ministry Of Culture in Russia.

== Track listing ==
All tracks are written by Viktor Tsoi.

No.	Title	Translation	Length
1.	"Videli noch'" (Russian: «Видели ночь»)	"Saw the Night"	3:09
2.	"Fil'my" (Russian: «Фильмы»)	"Films"	4:54
3.	"Tvoy nomer" (Russian: «Твой номер»)	"Your Number"	3:29
4.	"Tanets" (Russian: «Танец»)	"Dance"	4:33
5.	"Noch'" (Russian: «Ночь»)	"Night"	5:29
6.	"Posledniy geroy" (Russian: «Последний герой»)	"Last Hero"	2:15
7.	"Zhizn' v styoklakh" (Russian: «Жизнь в стёклах»)	"Life in the Windows"	3:22
8.	"Mama Anarkhiya" (Russian: «Мама-анархия»)	"Mother Anarchy"	2:44
9.	"Zvyozdy ostanutsya zdyes'" (Russian: «Звёзды останутся здесь»)	"The Stars Will Remain Here"	3:37
10.	"Igra" (Russian: «Игра»)	"Game"	5:01
11.	"My khotim tantsevat'" (Russian: «Мы хотим танцевать» (Backing vocalist: the group "Mladshiye brat'ya"))	"We Want to Dance"	4:09
Total length:			42:42

== Personnel ==
- Viktor Tsoi – vocals, acoustic guitar, guitar
- Yuri Kasparyan – lead guitar, backing vocals
- Aleksandr Titov – bass guitar
- Georgiy Guryanov – percussion, backing vocals

Additional personnel

- Igor Butman – saxophone
- "The Young Brothers" – backing vocals
- Andrei Tropillo – flute, backing vocals
