= 46 (album) =

1983 studio album by Kino

Demo album by Kino
- Released: 12 December 1983
- Genres: Folk rock, contemporary folk, pop
- Length: 41:59
- Language: Russian
- Label: AnTrop

Kino chronology
45 (1982)	46 (1983)	Nachalnik Kamchatki (1984)

46 is the demo album by the Soviet rock band Kino. It was recorded in 1983 at the AnTrop studio and released on 12 December 1983. The album consisted of demos of songs written by the band's singer, Viktor Tsoi. It was largely dismissed by Tsoi as a "rehearsal tape" for Nachalnik Kamchatki, with many of the songs in 46 being used in the later album. Despite this, fans viewed it as the band's second album. The band has never recognized it as a legitimate album.

== Reception ==
Professional ratings
Review scores
Source	Rating
AllMusic	2/5 stars

Neil Davidson of AllMusic described the album as a "bunch of lo-fi demos, mainly recorded with very little or no accompaniment beyond the odd half-hearted overdub," and gave it a two-star rating.

== Track listing ==
All lyrics are written by Viktor Tsoi; all music is composed by Sergey Kuryokhin.

No.	Title	Translation	Length
1.	"Троллейбус"	Trolleybus	2:51
2.	"Камчатка"	Kamchatka	2:11
3.	"Транквилизатор"	Tranquilizer	5:29
4.	"Я Иду По Улице"	Walk Down the Street	2:01
5.	"Дождь Для Нас"	Rain For Us	3:27
6.	"Пора"	Time	1:47
7.	"Каждую Ночь"	Every Night	2:49
8.	"Без Десяти"	Before Ten	2:07
9.	"Музыка Волн"	Music of the Waves	2:46
10.	"Саша"	Sasha	4:06
11.	"Хочу Быть С Тобой"	I Want to Be With You	2:21
12.	"Генерал"	General	4:06
Total length:			35:56

Also featured are three bonus tracks.

No.	Title	Translation	Length
13.	"Стань Птицей"	Become a Bird	2:10
14.	"Сельва"	Selva	2:49
15.	"Я Хочу Быть Кочегаром"	I Want to Be a Stoker	1:04
Total length:			6:03

== Personnel ==
- Viktor Tsoi – Vocals, Guitar
- Yuri Kasparyan – Guitar, Backing Vocals
- Alexey Vishnya – Sound engineer, Percussion
