= Sinii Albom =

The Blue Album

Studio album by Aquarium
- Released: 1981
- Recorded: Leningrad, 1981
- Genre: Rock, blues, reggae, psychedelia
- Length: 41:03
- Label: Los Pills Records, AnTrop
- Producer: Andrei Tropillo

Aquarium chronology
The Blue Album (1981)	Triangle (1981)

The Blue Album (Russian: Синий альбом) is a first "historic" album by the Russian rock band Aquarium. Recorded during winter of 1981, the album is typical for Aquarium as its sound goes from soft to sweeping. It is predominantly acoustic, but "Electric Dog" and "Strange Objects Between the Light and Sound" feature electric guitar.

== Track listing ==
All songs written by Boris Grebenshchikov, except where noted

This side

1. "Railroad Water" (Железнодорожная вода) 5:44
2. "Rock’n’Roll Heroes (Young Punks)" (Герои Рок-н-ролла (молодая шпана)) 3:35
3. "Guest" (Гость) 1:49
4. "Strange Objects Between Light and Sound" (Странные объекты между светом и звуком) 0:42 (A. Romanov)
5. "Electric Dog" (Электрический пес) 3:44
6. "All I Want" (Все, что я хочу) 4:26
7. "Tea" (Чай) 2:15

That side

1. "Plane" (Плоскость) 6:43
2. "Rootman" (Рутман) 3:03
3. "On a Night Like This" (В подобную ночь) 2:50
4. "The Only Home (Jah Will Provide)" (Единственный дом (Джа даст нам все)) 2:09
5. "River" (Река) 4:03

== Musicians ==
- Boris "BG" Grebenshchikov – vocals, acoustic guitar, forte piano, harmonica
- Andrei "Dyusha" Romanov – flute, vocals, electric guitar
- Mikhail "Fan" Fainstein – bass, percussion
- Vsevolod "Seva" Gakkel – cello
- Dmitri Gusev (Red Haired Devil) – harmonica, percussion
