= Andrei Tropillo =

Andrei Tropillo Андрей Тропилло
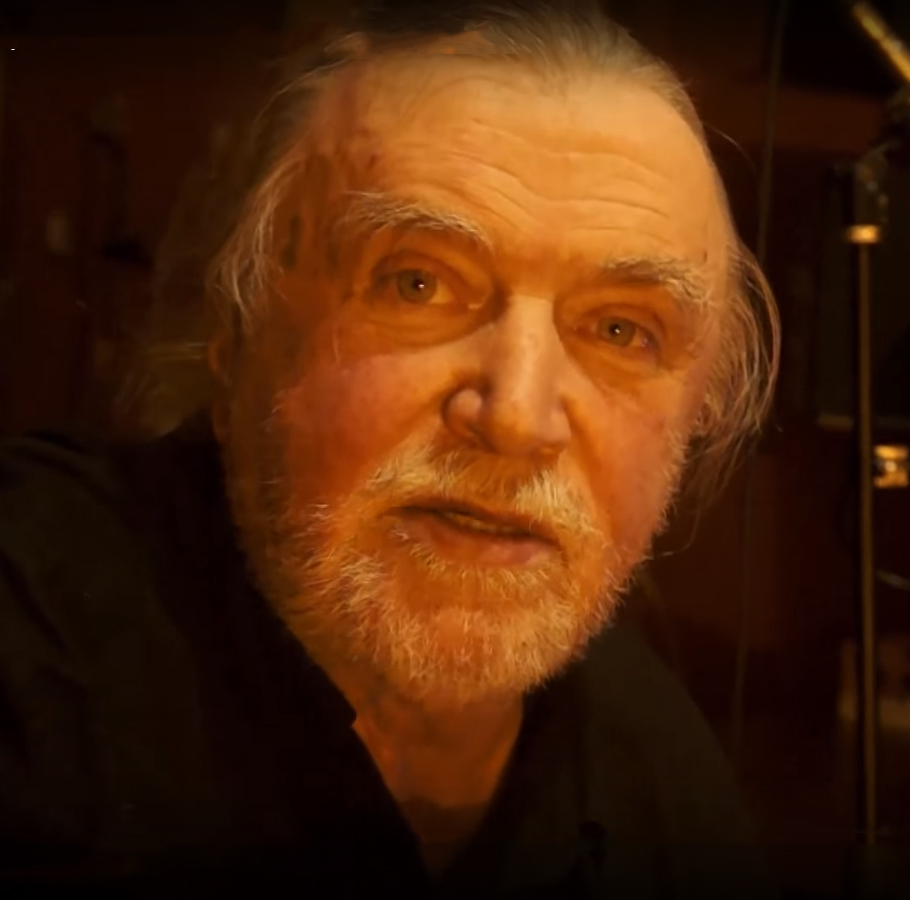
- Tropillo in 2017

Background information
- Born: 21 March 1951; Leningrad, Russian SFSR, USSR
- Died: 28 April 2024 (aged 73); Finland
- Occupation(s): Musician, sound engineer, producer, publisher

Andrei Vladimirovich Tropillo (Russian: Андрей Владимирович Тропилло; 21 March 1951 – 28 April 2024) was a Soviet and Russian record producer, music publisher, sound engineer, founder of the label AnTrop ("АнТроп"), and rock musician.

== Biography ==
Tropillo first became involved in the Soviet rock scene in the 1970s. In 1976, he initially attempted to set up a small record factory in a room rented from his then-employer, the Geophysics department of Leningrad University. He also organized concerts for several bands, including Mashina Vremeni, and used the income to buy technical equipment for sound recording. Tropillo later started working part-time at the House of Pioneers in the Krasnogvardeysky District of Leningrad, teaching members of the Young Pioneers about sound recording and giving guitar lessons. This position afforded him better access to sound equipment and allowed him to develop a studio.

Tropillo began to invite local rock bands to record in the House of Pioneers, starting with Aquarium and Mify (Russian: Мифы, lit. 'The Myths'). From 1979 to 1985, the albums of such groups as Mashina Vremeni, Aquarium, Zoopark, Kino, and Alisa were recorded in his unofficial studio, AnTrop. From 1980 to 1986, Tropillo and Aquarium worked together to record ten albums. Albums were initially distributed as magnitizdat. Tropillo would distribute master copies to recording cooperatives on reel-to-reel tapes, which were then re-copied and distributed to other cooperatives across the country.

In 1985, Tropillo was dismissed from his role at the House of Pioneers and his studio was closed. He temporarily stored his equipment at the Leningrad Rock Club, before setting up a new AnTrop studio. The 1986 compilation album Red Wave, released in the USA, was composed of tracks recorded in Tropillo's studio, although Tropillo was not credited by name.

In 1987, Tropillo started working at Melodiya. He brought over several of the master tapes recorded in his old studio and made them available to the label, sometimes without the permission of the musicians involved. In his position at Melodiya, Tropillo was able to officially release some of his previously made recordings as LPs. In 1989, he became the director of the Leningrad branch of Melodiya.

In 1991, the St. Petersburg Evangelical-Lutheran Church became the new home of the AnTrop label. From here, Tropillo released copies of albums by Western rock bands such as The Beatles, Rolling Stones, Led Zeppelin, Black Sabbath, and Sonic Youth, taking advantage of gaps in the Russian intellectual property laws at the time. He would make alterations to the record covers to circumvent copyright laws. On the sleeve of the AnTrop release of Sgt. Pepper's Lonely Hearts Club Band, Karl Marx is replaced by the Russian Beatles fan Kolya Vasin and Tropillo's face is inserted in the top row. In his interview for the BBC Storyville documentary How the Beatles Rocked the Kremlin, Tropillo stated: "I support not copyright but copyleft. Because I'm sure that in Russia we should support musical piracy, because musical piracy was the key to have freedom in Russia, to have free information."

Tropillo died on 28 April 2024 in Finland, at the age of 73. He had moved to Finland two years earlier.

== Discography ==
Year	Role	Album	Artist
1978	Compiler	Den' rozhdeniya (Russian: "День рождения", lit. 'Birthday')	Mashina Vremeni
1979	Compiler	Malen'kii prints (Russian: "Маленький принц", lit. 'The little prince')	Mashina Vremeni
1980	Sound engineer	Proschai, chyornaya subbota (Russian: "Прощай, чёрная суббота"	Yuri Stepanov (keyboardist of Mify)
1981	Compiler	Moskva — Leningrad (Russian: "Москва — Ленинград", lit. 'Moscow — Leningrad')	Mashina Vremeni
1981	Sound engineer	Doroga domoi (Russian: "Дорога домой" , lit. 'The way home')	Mify (Russian: Мифы, lit. 'The Myths')
1981	Sound engineer	Sinii albom (Russian: "Синий альбом", lit. 'Blue Album')	Aquarium
1981	Studio sound engineer	Istoria Akvariuma. Tom II. Elektrichestvo (Russian: "История Аквариума. Том II. Электричество")	Aquarium
1981	Sound engineer, musician (flute, backing vocals)	Treugol'nik (Russian: "Треугольник", lit. 'The Triangle')	Aquarium
1982	Sound engineer	Nesostoyavshiisya kontsert (Russian: "Несостоявшийся концерт")	Andrey Makarevich
1982	Sound engineer	Dym (Russian: "Дым", lit. 'Smoke')	Piknik
1982	Sound engineer	Taboo (Russian: "Табу")	Aquarium
1982	Sound engineer	Istoria Akvariuma. Tom I. Akustika (Russian: "История Аквариума. Том I. Акустика")	Aquarium
1982	Sound engineer, musician (flute, backing vocals)	45	Kino
1982	Sound engineer, musician (flute, backing vocals)	Strasti po Innokentiyu (Russian: "Страсти по Иннокентию")	Olga Pershina
1982	Sound engineer for parts of the recording	Еxercises	Vladimir Chekasin, Sergey Kuryokhin, BG
1983	Sound engineer (mobile studio MCI)	Radio Africa (Russian: "Радио Африка")	Aquarium
1983	Sound engineer	Vchera i pozavchera v uezdnom gorode N (Russian: "Вчера и позавчера в уездном городе N")	Zoopark
1983	Sound engineer (mobile studio MCI)	Zal ozhidaniya (Russian: "Зал ожидания")	Manufaktura (Russian: Мануфактура, lit. 'Manufactory')
1983	Sound engineer for parts of songs (mobile studio MCI)	Metamorfozy (Russian: "Метаморфозы", lit. 'Metamorphoses')	Strannye Igry
1983	Sound engineer	Kolyosiko (Russian: "Колёсико", lit. 'The Little Wheel') (Note: the album was not distributed)	Vladimir Levy (leader of Tamburin)
1984	Sound engineer	Tanets volka (Russian: "Танец волка", lit. 'Wolf Dance')	Piknik
1984	Sound engineer	Den' Serebra (Russian: "День Серебра", lit. 'Day of the Silver')	Aquarium
1984	Sound engineer	MCI (compilation of songs recorded forTaboo but not included on the original album)	Aquarium
1984	Sound engineer, arrangements, musician (flute)	Belaya polosa (Russian: "Белая полоса")	Zoopark
1984	Sound engineer	Nachal'nik Kamchatki (Russian: "Начальник Камчатки")	Kino
1985	Sound engineer	Zhuk na rascheske (Russian: "Жук на расческе", lit. 'The Bug on the Comb') (Note: the album was not distributed)	Tamburin (Russian: Тамбурин, lit. 'Tambourine')
1985	Sound engineer	Ublyuzh'ya dolya (Russian: "Ублюжья доля", lit. 'A Bastard's Lot')	Oblachnyi krai (Russian: Облачный край, lit. 'Cloud Area')
1985	Sound engineer, musician (saxophone)	Shestvie ryb (Russian: "Шествие рыб")	Televizor
1985	Sound engineer, musician (flute, backing vocals), dramatization	Energiya (Russian: "Энергия", lit. 'Energy')	Alisa
1986	Sound engineer	Stremya i lyudi (Russian: "Стремя и люди", lit. 'The Stirrup & The People')	Oblachnyi krai
1986	Sound engineer, musician (backing vocals)	Deti Dekabrya (Russian: "Дети Декабря", lit. 'December Children')	Aquarium
1986	Sound engineer, musician (flute, backing vocals)	Noch' (Russian: "Ночь", lit. 'Night')	Kino
1986	Sound engineer, musician (backing vocals)	Smotri v oba (Russian: "Смотри в оба", lit. 'Look at both')	Strannye Igry
1986	Sound engineer	Muzyka drachyovykh napil'nikov (Russian: "Музыка драчёвых напильников")	Nol' (at the time of release, Nulevaya Gruppa)
1987	Sound engineer	BlokAda (Russian: "БлокАда", lit. 'Blockade') Recorded on Tropillo's 8-track and in the 24-track Melodiya mobile studio	Alisa
1987	Compiler	Ottepel' (Russian: "Оттепель") (Note: concert recording of the festival in Shushary, different from the studio album published in 1991)	DDT
1987	Sound engineer (mobile studio MCI)	Glasnost' (Russian: "Гласность")	Ob'ekt Nasmeshek (Russian: Объект насмешек, lit. 'The Object of Mockery')
1987	Sound engineer (mobile studio MCI)	Reagan Provocateur (Russian: "Рейган-провокатор")	Avtomaticheskie Udovletvoriteli
1987	Sound engineer (mobile studio MCI)	Muzyka dlya mertvykh (Russian: "Музыка для мертвых", lit. 'Music for the dead')	Televizor
1987	Sound engineer	Kamni Sankt-Peterburga (Russian: "Камни Санкт-Петербурга", lit. 'Stones of St. Petersburg') (Note: album finished at Andrei Sokolov’s home studio)	Nikolai Korzinin

In addition to rock groups, Tropillo produced recordings of the following jazz musicians:

- Sergey Kuryokhin
- Vladimir Chekasin
- Valentina Ponomaryova
- the duo Vladislav Makarov and Aleksandr Kondrashkin (1984)
