= Nachalnik Kamchatki =

Studio album by Kino
- Released: 1984
- Genres: New wave, post-punk, synthpop, synth rock, new romantic
- Length: 38:09
- Language: Russian
- Labels: AnTrop; Moroz Records (reissue)
- Producer: Andrei Tropillo

Kino chronology
46 (1983)	Nachalnik Kamchatki (1984)	Eto ne lyubov... (1985)

Nachalnik Kamchatki (Russian: Начальник Камчатки, lit. 'Chief of Kamchatka') is the second studio album by Soviet rock band Kino. The name of the album is a play on the title of the 1967 Soviet film Chief of Chukotka (Russian: Начальник Чукотки, romanized: Nachalnik Chukotki).

== Production ==
The album was recorded on a multitrack tape recorder in the AnTrop studio. Andrei Tropillo supervised and engineered the recording. Musicians from Aquarium and the AnTrop studio collective played alongside Kino. The album was initially released in 1984 and distributed as magnitizdat.

"Posledny geroy" was written by the band's frontman, Viktor Tsoi, from 1982 until 1983. According to drummer Georgy Guryanov, "Posledny geroy" is Kino's main song: "It's ironic, but [it's] the one from which an entire movement grew. It [the song] contains all [of] the band's heroism."

== Release ==
The song "Posledny geroy" (Russian: Последний герой, English: The Last Hero) was first released on Nachalnik Kamchatki (English: Chief of Kamchatki) in 1984. Other arrangements of the song were included in the albums Noch (1986), Posledny geroy (1989), Neizvestnyye pesni (1992), and 12_22 (2022).

The song was also performed by the group Kolybel as part of the project "KINOproby," and by the Russian artist Slim as part of the project "KINOproby Rap Tribute."

== Reception ==
A review of the album appeared in issue 7 of the rock samizdat journal, Roksi.

"Posledny geroy" took 22nd place in the list of "100 best songs of Russian rock in the 20th Century," according to the radio station Nashe Radio.

== Track listing ==
All tracks are written by Viktor Tsoi.

No.	Title	Translation	Length
1.	"Posledny geroy" (Russian: «Последний герой»)	"Last Hero"	2:53
2.	"Kazhduyu noch'" (Russian: «Каждую ночь»)	"Every Night"	2:58
3.	"Trankvilizator" (Russian: «Транквилизатор»)	"Tranquilizer"	5:34
4.	"Syuzhet dlya novoy pesni" (Russian: «Сюжет для новой песни»)	"Theme for a New Song"	2:10
5.	"Gost'" (Russian: «Гость»)	"Guest"	3:56
6.	"Kamchatka" (Russian: «Камчатка»)	"Kamchatka"	2:51
7.	"Ariya mistera X" (Russian: «Ария мистера ИКС» (from Emmerich Kalman's operetta The Circus Princess))	"The Aria of Mr. X"	2:16
8.	"Trolleybus" (Russian: «Троллейбус»)	"Trolleybus"	2:22
9.	"Rastopite sneg" (Russian: «Растопите снег»)	"Melt Down the Snow"	1:50
10.	"Dozhd' dlya nas" (Russian: «Дождь для нас»)	"Rain for Us"	3:18
11.	"Khochu byt' s toboy" (Russian: «Хочу быть с тобой»)	"Want to Be with You"	2:26
12.	"General" (Russian: «Генерал»)	"General"	3:25
13.	"Progulka romantika" (Russian: «Прогулка романтика»)	"Walk of a Romantic"	3:35

== Personnel ==
- Viktor Tsoi – vocals, guitar
- Yuri Kasparyan – guitar
- Alexander Titov – bass guitar, percussion
- Boris Grebenshchikov – drum machine, Casio PT-1

Additional personnel

- Sergey Kuryokhin – keyboards
- Petr Troshchenkov – percussion
- Vsevolod Gakkel' – cello, drums
- Georgy Guryanov – percussion
- Igor Butman – saxophone
