= The Last Hero =

The Last Hero may refer to:

- The Last Hero (Pratchett novel), a 2001 fantasy novel by Terry Pratchett
- The Last Hero (Charteris novel), a 1930 The Saint novel by Leslie Charteris
- The Last Hero (album), a 2016 album by Alter Bridge
- The Last Hero (film), a 1982 Japanese motorcycle racing drama film
- Last Hero, a Russian reality TV series
- "Posledniy geroy", a song by Kino from the 1984 album Nachalnik Kamchatki
- Posledniy geroy (album) (The Last Hero in English), a 1989 album by Soviet band Kino

== See also ==
- Last Hero in China, a martial arts film
- The Lost Hero, a fantasy-adventure novel by Rick Riordan
