= Radio Silence (Boris Grebenshchikov album) =

Studio album by Boris Grebenshchikov
- Released: 12.06.1989 UK
- Recorded: 1988–1989
- Studios: The Hit Factory, New York; Church Studios, London; Chapel Studios, Los Angeles; Orca Studios, Los Angeles; Reb Bus Studios, London; Le Studio, Morin Heights, Quebec
- Genres: Post-punk, new wave, art rock
- Length: 46:53
- Label: Columbia
- Producer: David A. Stewart

Boris Grebenshchikov chronology
Equinox (1988)	Radio Silence (1989)	The Black Rose (1990)

Singles from Radio Silence
- 1. "Radio Silence" Released: 1989; 2. "The Postcard" Released: 1989

Radio Silence is an album by Boris Grebenshchikov (simplified to "Grebenshikov" on the cover), leader of the Russian group Aquarium. The album was recorded in 1988 – 1989 in studios in the United States, United Kingdom, and Canada, mostly with Western musicians, and produced by David A. Stewart. It was hailed as the first contract of a Russian (then, Soviet) rock musician with a Western label.

Having by then achieved the status of the most prominent rock musician in Russia, Boris had just recently been permitted to travel abroad (thanks to Perestroika). On most tracks, only Alexander Titov (bass) is of the then-current Russian Aquarium band, the rest being Western musicians (with the exception of Death of King Arthur where many Aquarium musicians can be heard). It was originally planned that the album would have half songs in Russian and half in English, but in the final album there are only two Russian songs on the B side.

== History ==
In 1987, American music producers Marina Albi and Kenny Shaffer noticed Grebenshchikov; they helped him to obtain a US visa and to sign a contract with CBS for recording eight albums. Radio Silence was the first one. It was recorded and presented in 1988 and distributed in 1989. The recording process was documented in the 1989 film The Long Way Home by Michael Apted.

Russian critics don't like Radio Silence because a) it is atypical for Aquarium, b) it never won any prize, implying the inferiority of Russian rock, and c) is atypical. As usual, they are right, and they understood nothing. RS crashed Aquarium, which then lived by its huge success in the Soviet Union (since late 1986 we were constantly cheered by the crowds, as if we had crushed socialism in the USSR), and placed us face to face with worldwide reality .. after 11 albums, it would make no sense for me to move to New York just for recording a 12th album of the same music. Its style was shaped after my encounter with David Stewart.

— Boris Grebenshchikov in 1997

== Critical reception ==
Professional ratings
Review scores
Source	Rating
AllMusic	3/5 stars
Hi-Fi News & Record Review	A:1
New Musical Express	5/10
The Rolling Stone Album Guide	2.5/5 stars

In a contemporary review for AllMusic, William Ruhlmann writes of the album: "This is a surprisingly polished, fluent effort that, except when the language is foreign, gives little hint of its origin."

== Track listing ==
All songs were written by Grebenshchikov, except for "Death of King Arthur" and "China".

1. "Radio Silence"
2. "The Postcard"
3. "The Wind"
4. "The Time"
5. "Winter"
6. "That Voice Again"
7. "Молодые Львы (The Young Lions)"
8. "Fields of My Love"
9. "Death of King Arthur" (music by BG, lyrics by Sir Thomas Malory)
10. "Real Slow Today"
11. "Mother"
12. "Китай (China)" (music by Alexander Vertinsky and lyrics by Nikolay Gumilyov)

== Personnel ==
- Boris Grebenshchikov – vocals, guitar
- David A. Stewart – guitar
- Olle Romo – drums, synclavier
- Patrick Seymour – keyboards
- Sasha Titov, Chucho Merchan – bass
- Michael Kamen – oboe
- Darryl Way – violin
- Ray Cooper – percussion
- Dave Plews – trumpet
- Annie Lennox, Siobhan Stewart, Billy Mackenzie, John Stewart, Harry Dean Stanton, Seva Gakkel, Charlie Wilson, Chrissie Hynde, Joniece Jamison – vocals

== Charts ==
Chart (1989)	Peak position
US (Billboard 200)	198
