= Red Wave =

Red Wave: 4 Underground Bands from the USSR

Compilation album by Aquarium, Kino, Alisa and Strannye Igry
- Released: 1986
- Genre: Russian rock
- Length: 87:43 (US and Russian LP); 50:00 (European LP); 75:56 (CD)
- Label: Big Time Records
- Producer: Joanna Stingray

Red Wave: 4 Underground Bands from the USSR was a split double album released in 1986 and featuring Russian rock bands Aquarium, Kino, Alisa, and Strannye Igry (Strange Games), all from Leningrad. It was the first release of Russian rock music into the United States.

Joanna Stingray, who developed a friendly relationship with some of the most prominent Soviet underground rock band members upon her first visit to the Soviet Union, and Boris Grebenshchikov, the Aquarium frontman, are credited with the idea of releasing such an album in the West. The material for this compilation was recorded on a non-commercial basis by the four Leningrad bands and smuggled by Joanna Stingray to the US. Production and release was done by the Australian indie label Big Time Records on June 27, 1986.

Three of the four bands (Aquarium, Kino and Alisa) on this album have later become icons of the Russian rock movement and are still widely known and followed in Russia. Due to the success of Red Wave, the Soviet state label Melodiya released the albums Noch and Energiya, as well as a compilation of Akvarium songs, in 1987 and 1988.

== Track listing ==
=== Side 1 (Aquarium) ===
From albums Taboo, The Children of December and Radio Africa.

1. "Пепел" (Ashes) – 3:10
2. "Сегодня ночью" (Tonight) – 4:36
3. "Танцы на грани весны" (Dance on the edge of the spring) – 4:25
4. "Жажда" (The Thirst) – 3:56
5. "Сны о чём-то большем" (Dreams Of Something Bigger) – 4:20
6. "Рок-н-ролл мёртв" (Rock'n'Roll is dead) - 3:27 (only on the vinyl release)

=== Side 2 (Kino) ===
Side B (Kino)
No.	Title	Length
1.	"Видели ночь ([We have] Seen the Night)" (from Noch, 1986)	3:04
2.	"Фильмы (Movies)" (from Noch, 1986)	3:32
3.	"Ночь (Night)" (from Noch, 1986, only available on the vinyl release)	5:25
4.	"Город (City)" (from Eto Ne Lyubov..., 1985)	3:46
5.	"Это — любовь (This is Love)" (also known as "Проснись" (Wake up) - from Eto Ne Lyubov..., 1985)	2:51
6.	"Троллейбус (Trolleybus)" (from Nachalnik Kamchatki, 1984)	2:24

=== Side 3 (Alisa) ===
All songs from the album Energy.

1. "Экспериментатор" (Experimentor) – 4:31
2. "Мы вместе" (We're together) – 2:43
3. "Доктор Буги" (Dr. Boogie) – 3:49
4. "Плохой Рок-н-ролл" (Bad boy) – 3:21
5. "Соковыжиматель" (Juice squeezer) – 3:14
6. "Ко мне" (Come to me) – 5:01

=== Side 4 (Strange Games) ===
From the albums Metamorphoses and Look at Them Both.

1. "Метаморфозы" (Metamorphoses) – 2:38
2. "Хоровод" (Chorovod song) – 3:21
3. "А телефона нет" (No telephone) – 2:51
4. "Эгоцентризм" (Egocentrism) – 4:29
5. "Если ты думаешь" (If You Think) – 3:54
6. "Бумажные цветы" (Paper Flowers) - 4:20 (only on vinyl release)

== Release history ==
The album was first released as a double LP on Big Time in 1986 containing 24 songs, six by each band. In 1987, the album was released in Europe as a single 14-track LP. The album was first officially released in Russia in 1991 on LP through SNC Records, containing the original US tracklist. 1994 saw the first and to date only CD release, also on SNC and omitting one track each by Kino, Akvarium and Strannye Igry.
