= VCDHD =

Optical disc format similar to DVD

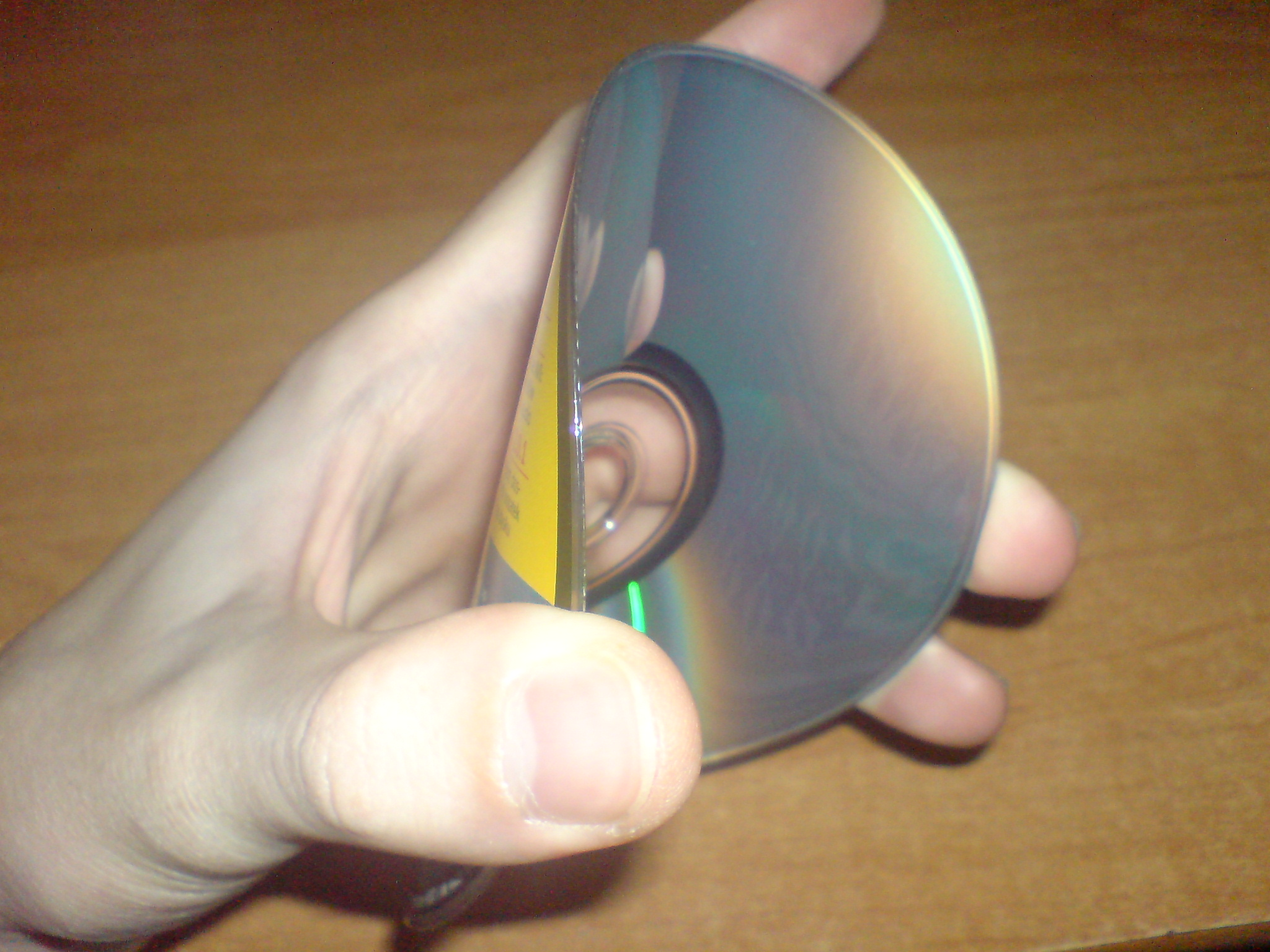
DVHD disc showing its elasticity

VCDHD (Versatile Compact Disc High Density) is an optical disc standard, similar to CD or DVD. The technology for VCDHD was invented by Andrei Tropillo. Since the name of the technology is similar to VCD, it's also marketed using the name DVHD (Disc Versatile High Density).

The capacity of a VCDHD is 4.7 GB, the same as an average single-layer DVD. According to the official site, the tests at Philips laboratories have proven the discs to be fully compatible with modern DVD players. With use of blue laser technology steadily becoming available now, the capacity may be increased by up to 15 GB.

The format's main advantages include:

- a better resistance to scratching in comparison to DVDs
- a thickness of 0.6 mm (compared to 1.2 mm of a DVD)
- extreme elasticity and the resulting resistance to bending
- low manufacturing and production costs and time (approximately 2 seconds for a VCDHD, compared to a DVD which is approximately three times that amount)
- production defect levels are only about 1%
- the format does not require a DVD license to manufacture
- It works correctly on most DVD drives

Most popular in: Russia, Ukraine and Poland.
