= Posledny geroy (album) =

Compilation album by Kino
- Released: 1989 (France); 1991 (Soviet Union)
- Genres: Alternative rock, post-punk, new wave, cold wave
- Length: 43:21
- Labels: Off The Track Records (initial 1989 French release); Russian Disc (1991 Russian release); Moroz Records (1993 Russian re-release)
- Producer: Joel Bastener

Kino chronology
Gruppa krovi (1988)	Posledny geroy (1989)	Zvezda po imeni Solntse (1989)

Posledny geroy (Russian: Последний герой, lit. 'The last hero'), initially released in France as Le Dernier Des Héros, is a compilation album by Soviet rock band Kino. While it contains rerecorded versions of many of their songs, the album is most notable for containing one of the band's most famous songs, "Khochu peremen!" (Russian: «Хочу перемен!», lit. 'I want change!'), which became a Perestroika anthem. The album was first released in France due to the band's newfound popularity abroad, and was later released domestically in the Soviet Union in 1991.

== History ==
Posledny geroy was recorded in the studio of Valery Leontiev in Moscow in January 1989, and was mixed in the Studio du Val d'Orge in the Paris suburb of Épinay sur Orge. At the same studio in November 1990, the Black Album was compiled. The release of the album was financed by Joel Bastener, cultural attaché of the Embassy of France in the USSR. The songs were chosen by Viktor Tsoi himself: he decided to make a "Best of" album, and insisted that the album was made in France. Having recorded the material in Valery Leontiev's studio, Tsoi gave it to Bastener for release. The album included songs from Gruppa krovi plus new versions of "Electrichka", "Trolleybus" and "Posledny geroy", as well as the famous composition "Hochu Peremen!" The album was released in France in April 1989 by Off The Track Records under the name Le Dernier Des Héros, alongside the single "Maman". Despite Bastener's best attempts to promote the album, the album was not only shelved from any US release but also barred with much skeptics from the French, many of whom believes that the album was merely a propaganda of the Perestroika movement, which only hammered the album's sales much further. It was named Последний герой upon its release in the USSR in 1991.

The design of the cover is based on the original collage of Viktor Tsoi and Georgy Guryanov. During the album's work was the recording of the song "Blood Type" which was requested by an American fan as a translation to "Группа крови", was not included in the album. The song was released in the 2002 collection The Last Recordings along with the song "Question/Bicycle" and unreleased studio recordings of the songs "Knock", "Sadness" and others as well as a pun made by Viktor Tsoi based in the band's name. In the 2000 remix album Victor Tsoi: Sadness, the vocals were taken from "The Last Hero".

== Track listing ==
Side A
No.	Title	Original album	Length
1.	"Changement" (Хочу Перемен - I Want Changes)	Previously unreleased	5:00
2.	"Train de Banlieue" (Электричка - Commuter Train)	45, 1982	4:50
3.	"Guerre" (Война - War)	Gruppa Krovi, 1988	4:04
4.	"Trolleybus" (Троллейбус - Trolleybus)	Nachalnik Kamchatki, 1984	2:58
5.	"D'où Vient Donc Cette Tristesse" (Печаль - Sadness)	Zvezda po imeni Solntse, 1989	5:11
Total length:			22:03

Side B
No.	Title	Original album	Length
1.	"Le Dernier Des Héros" (Последний Герой - The Last Hero)	Nachalnik Kamchatki	3:07
2.	"Groupe Sanguin" (Группа Крови - Blood Type)	Gruppa krovi	4:02
3.	"Maman" (Мама, мы все тяжело больны - Mother, we are all seriously ill)	Gruppa krovi	3:52
4.	"Dans Nos Yeux" (В Наших Глазах - In Our Eyes)	Gruppa krovi	3:50
5.	"Bonne Nuit" (Спокойная Ночь - Good Night)	Gruppa krovi	6:27
Total length:			21:18
