= 45 (Kino album) =

Studio album by Kino
- Released: 1982
- Recorded: 1982
- Genre: Folk rock; new wave; pop
- Length: 43:04
- Label: AnTrop
- Producer: Boris Grebenshchikov

Kino chronology
45 (1982)	46 (1983)

45 is the debut studio album by Soviet rock band Kino. It was recorded in 1982 in the AnTrop studio, owned by Andrei Tropillo and distributed as magnitizdat. At the time, Kino consisted of Viktor Tsoi and Aleksei Rybin. Boris Grebenshchikov provided additional instrumentation and musical production. Other members of Akvarium also helped with recording.

Professional ratings
Review scores
Source	Rating
AllMusic	(no rating)

== Track listing ==
All tracks are written by Viktor Tsoi.

No.	Title	Translation	Length
1.	"Vremya yest', a dyeneg nyet" (Russian: «Время есть, а денег нет»)	"Got Time, But No Money"	4:07
2.	"Prosto hochyesh' ty znat'" (Russian: «Просто хочешь ты знать»)	"You Just Wanted To Know"	3:28
3.	"Alyuminievye ogurtsy" (Russian: «Алюминиевые огурцы»)	"Aluminium Cucumbers"	2:56
4.	"Solnechnye dni" (Russian: «Солнечные дни»)	"Sunny Days"	3:12
5.	"Bezdel'nik" (Russian: «Бездельник»)	"The Slacker"	3:13
6.	"Bezdel'nik 2" (Russian: «Бездельник 2»)	"The Slacker 2"	3:06
7.	"Elektrichka" (Russian: «Электричка»)	"Suburban Train"	2:36
8.	"Vos'miklassnitsa" (Russian: «Восьмиклассница»)	"Eighth-Grade Girl"	2:45
9.	"Moi druz'ya" (Russian: «Мои друзья»)	"My Friends"	4:26
10.	"Sitar igral" (Russian: «Ситар играл»)	"The Sitar Played"	1:34
11.	"Derevo" (Russian: «Дерево»)	"Tree"	1:43
12.	"Kogda-to ty bil bitnikom" (Russian: «Когда-то ты был битником»)	"You Used to be a Beatnik"	3:41
13.	"Na kuhne" (Russian: «На кухне»)	"In the Kitchen"	3:03
14.	"Ya - asfal't" (Russian: «Я — асфальт»)	"I am Asphalt"	3:10

== Personnel ==
=== Kino ===
- Viktor Tsoi – vocals, acoustic guitar, bass guitar
- Aleksei Rybin – lead guitar

=== Akvarium ===
- Boris Grebenshchikov – guitar, glockenspiel, backing vocals
- Mikhail Vasil'ev – drum machine, backing vocals
- Vsevolod Gakkel' – cello
- Andrei Romanov – flute

=== Additional personnel ===
- Andrei Tropillo – flute, backing vocals
