= Radio Africa =

Studio album by Aquarium
- Released: 1983
- Recorded: Leningrad, 1983
- Genre: Art rock, new wave, psychedelic rock
- Length: 52:46
- Label: AnTrop (1983 release); Melodiya (1988 release)
- Producer: Andrei Tropillo

Aquarium chronology
Taboo (1982)	Radio Africa (1983)	Ichthyology (1984)

Radio Africa (Russian: Радио Африка) is an album by the Russian rock band Aquarium.

The album's style presents an eclectic mix of influences: new wave, art rock, post-punk, jazz, psychedelia, honky tonk, free improvisation, ethnic music and others.

According to the liner notes of the remastered version of the album, it was recorded in a mobile studio owned by the Soviet government, after the band bribed its technician.

Many guest musicians participated in the recording, including the notable saxophonist Igor Butman and avant-garde jazz pianist Sergey Kuryokhin.

The album includes some of Aquarium's best known and most cited songs - Captain Africa (Капитан Африка), The Art of Being Humble (Искусство быть смирным), and the bleak anthem Rock 'n Roll is Dead (Рок-н-ролл мёртв), which was chosen by Nashe Radio as one of the top 100 Russian rock songs of the twentieth century.

Due to its eclecticism and historical importance it was dubbed "The White Album of Russian rock".

== Album cover ==
The album cover was designed by Andrey "Willy" Usov. The front cover depicts a photograph of Vsevolod Gakkel's silhouette (taken on the deserted shore of the Gulf of Finland near the Pribaltiyskaya Hotel).

The Chinese characters on the front cover (無線非洲) were written by sinologist Sergei Puchkov; they translate to "wireless Africa."

== Track listing ==
1. "Music of the Silver Spokes (Музыка серебряных спиц)" - 3:34
2. "Captain Africa (Капитан Африка)" - 5:12
3. "The Songs of the Drawers-Out (Песни вычерпывающих людей)" - 3:22
4. "Snake (Змея)" - 1:00
5. "Vana Khoya (Вана Хойа)" - 5:43
6. "Rock 'N' Roll Is Dead (Рок-н-ролл мертв)" - 5:37
7. "Radio Shaolin (Радио Шао-Линь)" - 1:33
8. "The Art of Being Humble (Искусство быть смирным)" - 5:03
9. "Tibetan Tango (Тибетское танго)" - 3:15
10. "The Time of the Moon (Время Луны)" - 3:59
11. "Evgraf the Boy (Мальчик Евграф)" - 2:35
12. "To Your Star (Твоей звезде)" - 2:07
13. "It Was Snowing From the Morning (С утра шел снег)" - 3:53
14. "Another One Fallen Down (Еще один упавший вниз)" - 5:49

== References in individual songs ==
The title of the "Песня Вычерпывающих Людей" - "Song of the Drawers-Out" - draws on the book of Proverbs, chapter 20, verse 5:

"Counsel in the heart of man is like deep water; but a man of understanding will draw it out."
