= Eto ne lyubov... =

Studio album by Kino
- Released: 1985
- Genres: Jangle pop, new wave, pop rock, indie rock
- Label: Moroz Records
- Producer: Alexey Vishnya

Kino chronology
Nachalnik Kamchatki (1984)	Eto ne lyubov... (1985)	Noch (1985)

Eto ne lyubov... (Russian: Это не любовь..., lit. 'This is not love...') is the third studio album by Soviet rock band Kino. It was released in 1985.

A remake was released on 15 March 2024, featuring original vocals and a newly recorded instrumental.

== Track listing ==
All tracks are written by Viktor Tsoi.

No.	Title	Translation	Length
1.	"Eto ne lyubov" (Russian: «Это не любовь»)	"This is Not Love"	3:28
2.	"Vesna" (Russian: «Весна»)	"Spring"	2:00
3.	"Uhodi" (Russian: «Уходи»)	"Go Away"	4:36
4.	"Gorod" (Russian: «Город»)	"City"	3:44
5.	"Eto lyubov (also known as 'Prosnis')" (Russian: «Это — любовь» (also known as Проснись))	"This is love" (also known as "Wake up")	3:32
6.	"Ryadom so mnoy" (Russian: «Рядом со мной»)	Next to Me	3:51
7.	"Ya ob'yavlyayu svoy dom... (also known as 'Bez'yadernuyu zonu')" (Russian: «Я объявляю свой дом…» (also known as Безъядерная зона))	"I Declare my Home..." (also known as "Nuclear-free zone")	2:22
8.	"Sasha" (Russian: «Саша»)	"Sasha"	3:16
9.	"Ver' mne" (Russian: «Верь мне»)	"Believe Me"	5:33
10.	"Deti prohodnyh dvorov" (Russian: «Дети проходных дворов»)	"Children of the No Man's Yards"	1:46
11.	"Muzyka voln" (Russian: «Музыка волн»)	"Music of the Waves"	4:10
Total length:			38:18

Bonus tracks from the 1996 Moroz Records release
No.	Title	Translation	Length
12.	"Razreshi Mne..." (Russian: «Разреши мне…»)	"Allow Me..."	4:21
13.	"Stishok" (Russian: «Стишок» (An excerpt from the lyrics of the song 'Printsessa ' from the repertoire of the band "Kofe"))	"A little poem"	0:13
14.	"Prohozhiy" (Russian: «Прохожий»)	"Passer-by"	3:34
Total length:			46:27

== Personnel ==
- Viktor Tsoi – vocals, guitar
- Yuri Kasparyan – guitar
- Aleksandr Titov – bass guitar
- Georgy Guryanov – drum machine
