= Joanna Stingray =

American singer (born 1960)

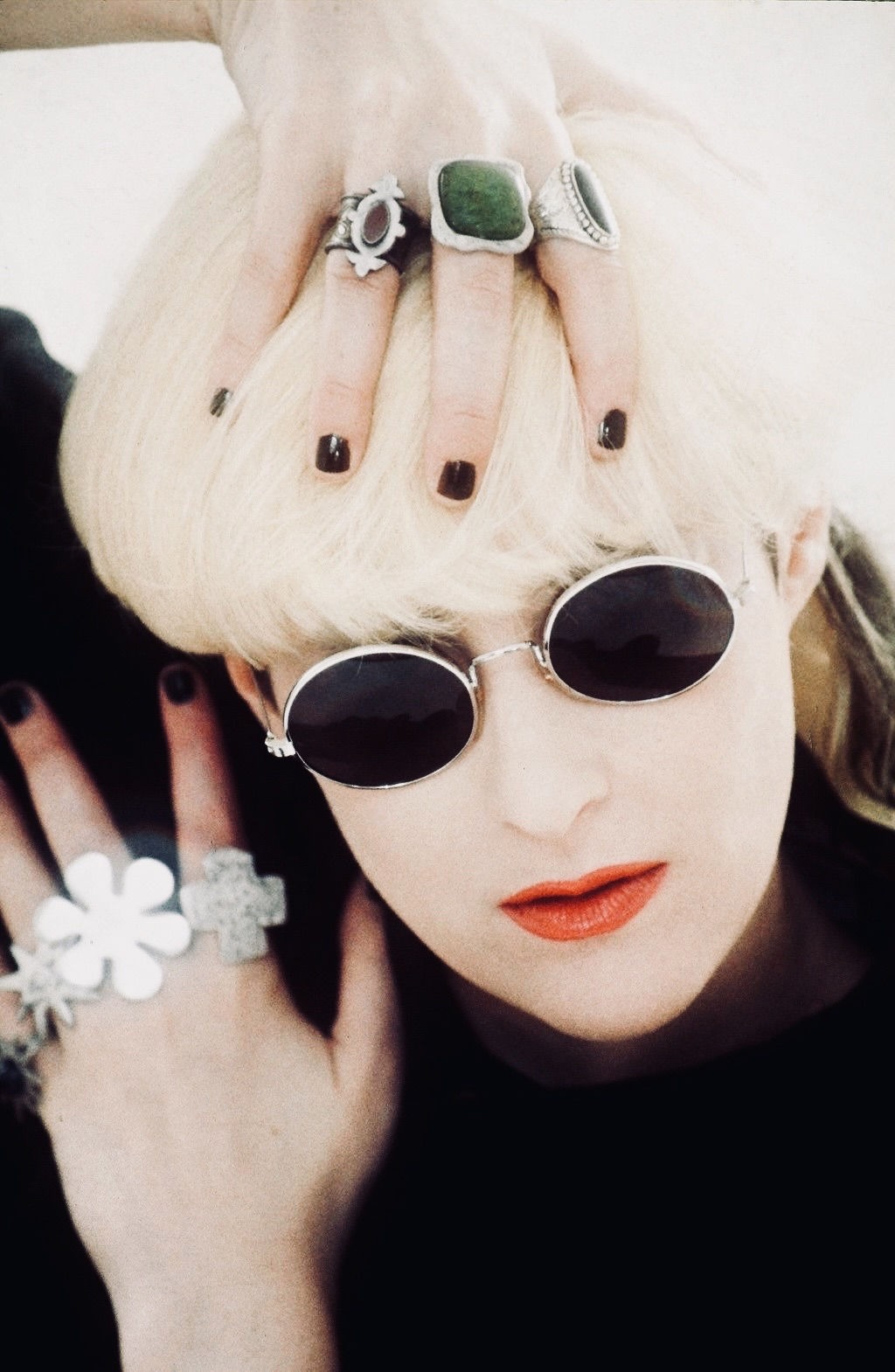
- Joanna Stingray, 1993
- Born: Joanna Fields; July 3, 1960 (age 66); Los Angeles, California, U.S.
- Occupations: Musician, producer
- Known for: Popularising post-Soviet rock music in the US

Joanna Stingray (Russian: Джоанна Стингрей Dzhoanna Stingrey, [dʐɐˈanə sʲtʲɪnˈɡrɛj], born Joanna Fields, 3 July, 1960) is an American singer, actress, music producer and socialite. She was a key figure in popularizing Soviet and Russian rock music and culture in the West in the 1980s.

== Life and career ==
Born Joanna Fields, Stingray is a native of Los Angeles, California. In 1983, Stingray released her U.S. 12-inch, 4-track debut, Beverly Hills Brat, under the name Joanna. In her early musical career, she performed at Studio 54.

In 1984, aged 23, Stingray traveled to Leningrad as a tourist with her sister, who was studying in London and had an opportunity to take a trip to visit the Soviet Union for one week. In Leningrad, she was introduced to Boris Grebenshchikov of the rock group Aquarium. Impressed by Grebenshchikov, and other artists' music, Stingray began smuggling the music of underground Soviet rock bands beyond the confines of the Soviet Union.

On July 27, 1986, Australian record company Big Time Records, released Red Wave: 4 Underground Bands from the Soviet Union, a double album consisting of songs collected and produced by Stingray. Each record side includes songs by one artist and the bands included are Aquarium, Kino, Alisa, and Strannye Igry (Strange Games). It was the first release of Russian rock music in the United States. The record caught the attention of popular western artists, among them David Bowie and Andy Warhol. The Soviet leader Mikhail Gorbachev also heard about it; surprised that this music was published by a foreign company, he instructed the Minister of Culture to ease the publication of music of young Soviet musicians inside the country.

Stingray spent most of the decade living in Russia, where she worked variously as a musician, actress and television presenter before returning to the United States in 1996. After leaving Russia, she lost contact with her Russian "family" and many of the friends she had met during that time.

It wasn't until 2018 that Stingray discovered Facebook and with the help of her daughter Madison, she was finally able to reconnect with many of her Russian friends, including Grebenshchikov. In 2019, Madison helped her mother to write a two-volume memoir that described her experiences in the Soviet rock scene, published in Russian. In September 2020, the English-language version of the memoir, Red Wave: An American in the Soviet Music Underground, was released.

== Personal life ==
Stingray married the guitarist from the band Kino, Yuri Kasparyan on November 2, 1987. Despite initial language barriers, their marriage lasted for four years until their divorce in 1991. Stingray does not cite the language barrier as the main reason behind the split, but rather the death of mutual close friend Viktor Tsoi. She said in an interview from 2021, "And when Viktor died, both Yuri and I ... Everything just broke down in our lives. It was difficult to understand how to live, where my closest friend was... " The two parted as close friends, as there were no disagreements- it was just that their new lives began to head in different directions.

In 1991, the same year as her divorce, saw Stingray's second marriage with Aleksandr Vasilyev, who was the drummer of the Russian band Center at the time. Vasilyev is the father of her daughter, Madison. As of 2021, Stingray was married to her third husband, Richard Best, an architect from California. They married sometime after her return to the United States in 1996. Stingray and Best live together in Los Angeles.

As of 2004, Stingray was the executive director of the Beverly Hills High School Alumni Association. She spends her time working part-time as a real estate agent, enjoying a quiet life with her husband, and making music with Madison during her visits.

== Film, stage and television appearances ==
In 1993 Joanna was cast in the film Freak (Russian: «Урод»), directed by Roman Kachanov. In 1996 she collaborated with Aleksandr Lipnitsky to produce Sunny Days (Russian: «Солнечные дни»), a documentary film about the life of Viktor Tsoi.

On 20 June 1992, Stingray took part in the memorial concert for Viktor Tsoi held at Moscow's Luzhniki Stadium. She performed alongside Viktor Sologub (bass guitar, Strange Games), Valery Vinogradov (guitar, Center) and Aleksandr Vasilyev (percussion, Center).

== Discography ==
Albums released in the United States:

- Beverly Hills Brat (1983)

Russia-only releases:

- Thinking Till Monday (1990)
- Проходя Через Окна (Walking Through Windows) (1991)
- For A Moment (1994)
- Shades Of Yellow (1998)
- May There Always Be Sunshine (2007)
- Stay Together (2021)
- Surfin' Red Wave (The Original Recordings 1985-1987) (2022)

Singles:

- Stingray (1990)

Compilation albums:

- Rock Me But Don't Disrupt My Mind (1993) – recordings from 1983-1987
- Greenpeace Rocks (1993)

Albums produced by Stingray:

- Red Wave (1986)
