= AVIA =

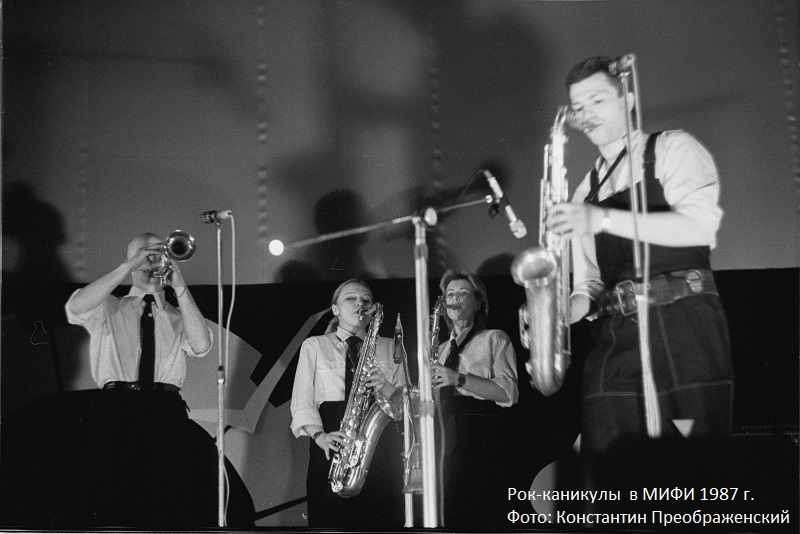

Background information
- Origin: Russia Saint Petersburg
- Genres: New wave, synthpunk, experimental pop, punk rock
- Years active: 1986–present
- Labels: Melodia, Zona Records, General, Hannibal Records
- Members: Nikolai Gusev, Alexey Rakhov, Yevgeny Zhdanov, Viktor Vyrvich, Anton Adasinsky, Veronika Berashevich, Lydia Kopina, Alexey Lanskoy
- Past members: Alexander Kondrashkin, Marat Timergazov, Ivan Fedenko, Yevgeny Skoblov, Valery Kuteinikov, Alexey Merkushev, Yelena Bobretsova, Tatyana Mironova, Alexander Nemkov, Dmitry Tyulpanov

AVIA (Russian: Анти Вокально-Инструментальный Ансамбль (АВИА), lit. 'Anti Vocal-Instrumental Ensemble') is a Soviet/Russian experimental pop band formed in Leningrad in 1986. AVIA released four studio albums and led the first wave of the Soviet bands which made their breakthrough in the West in the late 1980s.

== Band history ==
AVIA was formed in September 1985 by the ex-members of Strannye Igry, multi-instrumentalists Nikolai Gusev, Alexey Rakhov and drummer Alexander Kondrashkin who were joined by Anton Adasinsky (guitars, vocals), saxophonists Elena Bobretsova and Alexey Merkushev, and performance artist Marat Timergazov who, supported by the ever growing cast of dancers and gymnasts created a peculiar mass pantomime comprising elements of 1920s constructivism, sports parades and the early Soviet visual culture clichés. Equally eclectic was the band's style, a mix of new wave rock, quasi-classical marches and synthpop.

In 1987 AVIA received the special Press Award at the Rock Panorama musical festival and featured in Alexey Uchitel's film "Rock". The group's first album, the studio recording of their concept stage performance Из жизни композитора Зудова (From the Life of Composer Zudov) remained unreleased. After the release of АВИА Всем! (AVIA to Everybody!), formally a debut, but in effect, the second album, they gave concerts in Finland and Yugoslavia and started to appear on the Soviet TV. Anton Adasinsky departed in 1988 to form his own Дерево (Tree) Theatre and was replaced by Dmitry Tyulpanov and saxophonist Yevgeny Zhdanov. The line-up of the brass section changed too. The extensive European tour was followed by the international release of their debut: AVIA came out on Hannibal Records in England and received a 4 out of 5 stars rating from the Q magazine. Instrumental in this was the then Pink Floyd manager Peter Jenner.

In 1991 the band went into hiatus (with Rakhov joining N.O.M. and Zhdanov playing with ethnic jazz combo Sambkha). In 1994 Gusev, Rakhov and Zhdanov reunited to record Песни о природе и любви (Songs of Nature and Love). 1996's Жизнь после жизни (Life After Life) proved to be AVIA's final studio work, although the band have re-united for numerous live concerts since.

== Line-up ==
=== Current ===
- Nikolai Gusev – vocals, keyboards
- Alexey Rakhov – saxophone, accordion, flute, vocals
- Yevgeny Zhdanov – saxophone, flute, vocals
- Viktor Vyrvich – drums, percussion
- Anton Adasinsky – vocals, trumpet, pantomime, stage performance
- Veronika Berashevich – baritone sax
- Lydia Kopina – accordion* Alexey Lanskoy – stage performance, declamations

=== Past members ===
- Alexander Kondrashkin – drums, xylophonee, percussion
- Ivan Fedenko- drums, percussion
- Yevgeny Skoblov – trumpet, vocals
- Valery Kuteynikov – trombone
- Alexay Merkushev – saxophone, vocals
- Elena Bobretsova – saxophone, vocals
- Tatyana Mironova – saxophone
- Alexander Nemkov – bass guitar
- Dmitry Tyulpanov – vocal, pantomime
- Marat Timergazov – stage performance

== Discography ==
- AVIA to Everybody! (АВИА Всем!, Мелодия, 1988)
- AVIA (Hannibal, 1990 – the debut album's international release // RDM Co. Ltd./F records, 1995)
- Hurray! (Ура!, General Records, 1995)
- Songs of Nature and Love (Песни о природе и любви, General Records, 1995)
- Life After Life (Жизнь после жизни, 1996)
