= Magnitizdat =

Underground recorded music distribution in the Soviet Union

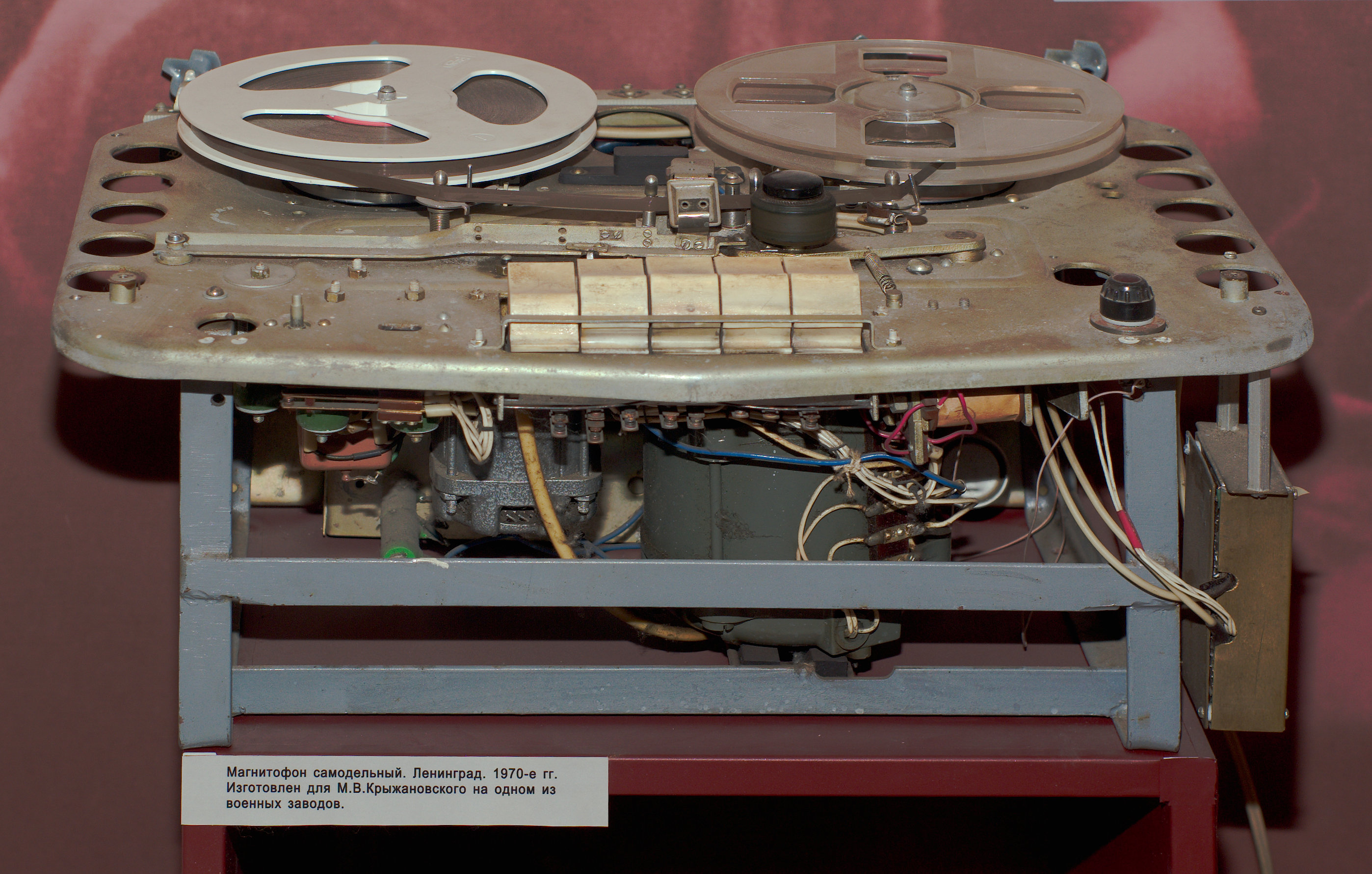
Tape recorder "Tembr" (1964) without casing (from museum of political history of Russia)

Magnitizdat (Russian: магнитиздат (Note: Russian pronunciation: [məɡnʲɪtʲɪzˈdat]), lit. 'tape-recorded publishing') was the process of copying and distributing audio tape recordings that were not commercially available in the Soviet Union. It is analogous to samizdat, the method of disseminating written works that could not be officially published under Soviet political censorship. It is technically similar to bootleg recordings, except it has a political dimension not usually present in the latter term.

== Terminology ==
The term magnitizdat comes from the Russian words magnitofon (Russian: магнитофон (Note: Russian pronunciation: [məɡnʲɪtɐˈfon]), lit. 'magnetic tape recorder') and izdatel’stvo (Russian: издательство (Note: Russian pronunciation: [ɪˈzdatʲɪlʲstvə]), lit. 'publishing').

== Technology ==
Magnetic tape recorders were rare in the Soviet Union before the 1960s. During the 1960s, the Soviet Union mass-produced reel-to-reel tape recorders for the consumer market. In addition, Western and Japanese tape recorders were sold through secondhand shops and the black market.

According to Alexei Yurchak, in contrast to samizdat, "magnitizdat managed to elude state control by virtue of its technological availability and privacy." While the state controlled the ownership of printing presses, Soviet citizens were allowed to own reel-to-reel tape recorders. Making more than six typewritten copies of a document to distribute was forbidden, but there was no legal limit on copying tapes. In addition, only the performer on the recording was considered responsible for the content.

In Soviet Latvia, audio engineer Juris Lapinskis heavily modified commercially available Soviet equipment and integrated imported Western components. To bypass the low fidelity of Soviet manufacturing, Lapinskis utilized high-end American stylus cartridges—which at the time cost equivalent to a Soviet Zhiguli automobile—to create a high-fidelity mastering. Furthermore, during a period of intense solar activity between 1958 and 1961, Lapinskis exploited atmospheric ionospheric conditions to capture static-free, studio-quality shortwave broadcasts from the Voice of America and the BBC, archiving over 250 hours of Western music that served as a foundation for regional magnitizdat networks.

== Bard songs ==
Live recordings of bard songs performed at informal gatherings were the first works to be distributed as magnitizdat. Bulat Okudzhava, Alexander Galich, Vladimir Vysotsky, and Yuli Kim were among the bards whose music was distributed as magnitizdat. Their lyrics dealt with political themes and contained criticisms of Stalin, labor camps, and contemporary Soviet life.

The recordings were copied and recopied in private and distributed through networks of friends and acquaintances throughout the Soviet Union. Recordings of bard songs were also brought to the West by tourists and emigres and then broadcast on Radio Liberty.

== Rock music ==
In rock music circles, magnitizdat was initially used for recording short-wave radio broadcasts and copying vinyl records of Western rock music. Reel-to-reel reproductions of Western rock were sold on the black market. Recordings of Western artists such as The Beatles, Led Zeppelin, Deep Purple, and Donna Summer were distributed throughout the Soviet Union as magnitizdat.

By the late 1970s, magnitizdat was used to distribute Soviet rock music as well. Soviet rock groups began recording albums, also known as magnitoal'bomy, as opposed to live concert recordings.

Andrei Tropillo was the first to set up a studio to record Russian rock bands on a regular basis. The AnTrop logo appeared on recordings from Tropillo's studio. Tropillo’s distribution method usually consisted of handing ten master copies on reel-to-reel tapes to recording cooperatives, which then re-copied and distributed the tapes to other cooperatives and cities.

In 1986, Red Wave, a compilation album featuring tracks from several bands associated with the Leningrad Rock Club, was released in the U.S. by Big Time Records. The album contained tracks from magnitoal’bomy originally recorded in Tropillo’s studio and brought out of the Soviet Union by Joanna Stingray.

== Punk ==
The first punk recording in the Soviet Union has been attributed to the band Avtomaticheskie Udovletvoriteli. One of their performances in Moscow was recorded with a single microphone and released as magnitizdat in 1981.

The Siberian punk group Grazhdanskaya Oborona recorded songs on minimal equipment in Yegor Letov's home studio. Letov would then send his albums to acquaintances across the country, who made further copies of the tapes. Other Siberian punk bands followed Letov's example by limiting their live performances to apartment concerts and making recordings with reel-to-reel tape recorders and microphones.

== See also ==
- Samizdat
- Roentgenizdat
- Cassette culture

== Bibliography ==
- Garey, Amy (2011). "Aleksandr Galich: Performance and the Politics of the Everyday". Limina. 17: 1–13. eISSN 1833-3419. Archived (PDF) from the original on 2012-03-17.
- Gololobov, Ivan; Steinholt, Yngvar B. (2014). "The evolution of punk in Russia". In Gololobov, Ivan; Pilkington, Hilary; Steinholt, Yngvar B. (eds.). Punk in Russia: Cultural mutation from the "useless" to the "moronic". Routledge. ISBN 978-1-317-91310-8.
- Herbert, Alexander (2019). What about tomorrow? : an oral history of Russian punk from the Soviet era to Pussy Riot. Portland, Ore: Microcosm Publishing. ISBN 978-1-62106-404-6.
- McMichael, Polly (July 2009). "Prehistories and Afterlives: The Packaging and Re-packaging of Soviet Rock". Popular Music and Society. 32 (3): 331–350. doi:10.1080/03007760902985791. S2CID 192072681.
- Sosin, Gene (1975). "Magnitizdat: Uncensored Songs of Dissent". In Tökés, Rudolf L. (ed.). Dissent in the USSR : politics, ideology, and people. Baltimore : Johns Hopkins University Press. ISBN 978-0-8018-1661-1.
- Steinholt, Yngvar Bordewich (2005). Rock in the reservation : songs from Leningrad Rock Club 1981-86. Mass Media Music Scholars' Press. ISBN 978-0-9701684-3-6.
- Woodhead, Leslie (2013). How the Beatles rocked the Kremlin : the untold story of a noisy revolution. ISBN 978-1-60819-614-2.
- Yurchak, Alexei (1999). "Gagarin and the Rave Kids". In Barker, Adele Marie (ed.). Consuming Russia : popular culture, sex, and society since Gorbachev. Durham [N.C.] : Duke University Press. ISBN 978-0-8223-2281-8.
