= Strannye Igry =

- Origin: Leningrad, Russia
- Genres: new wave, ska, punk rock
- Years active: 1980–1986, 1996-present
- Label: Melodiya
- Spinoffs: AVIA, Igry, Deadushki
- Members: Viktor Sologub; Alexey Rakhov; Nikolai Gusev; Igor Cherednik; Filipp Sologub
- Past members: Grigory Sologub, Alexander Davydov, Nikolai Kulikovskikh, Alexander Kondrashkin, Nikolai Olshevsky

Strannye Igry (Russian: Странные игры, Strange Games) was a Soviet Leningrad-based new wave band, noted for using the ska influences (which was unusual for the Soviet music scene of the time), writing lyrics based on the translations of the early 20th century French poetry and indulging themselves in all sorts of buffoonery on stage. The Leningrad avant-pop experimenter Sergey Kuryokhin was their regular collaborator. Six of Strannye Igry's songs featured in a 1986 split double album Red Wave which also featured Aquarium, Kino and Alisa.

Strannye Igry released two studio albums, Metamorphosis (1983) and Look Sharp (1986), the latter recorded without Davydov, who'd left in April 1984 and died two months later of heart attack. Not long before the second album's release, they split-up.

Rakhov, Kondrashkin and Nikolai Gusev (a second keyboardist who joined Strannye Igry in 1982) formed AVIA. The Sologub brothers released two albums in late 1986-1989 as part of Igry, a four-piece, featuring Igor Cherednik and Andrei Nuzhdin. In late-1990s Rakhov and Viktor Sologub became part of an electronic project called Deadushki.

Since 1996 Strannye Igry started to sporadically reform for odd concerts, but no original material has been released. Alexander Kondrashkin, by then a highly acclaimed, versatile instrumentalist, died of stroke on 9 July 1999. Grigory Sologub died on 27 February 2009 in Saint Petersburg, of heart failure.

== Discography ==
- Metamorfozy (Метаморфозы, Metamorphosis, 1983 АнТроп/Мелодия)
- Smotri v oba (Смотри в оба, Look Sharp, 1986, АнТроп/Мелодия)
