= Kino (band) =

Soviet rock band

Kino Кино
- Yuri Kasparyan, Viktor Tsoi, Georgy Guryanov, and Igor Tikhomirov in 1988

Background information
- Also known as: Garin i Giperboloidy (1981–1982)
- Origin: Leningrad, Russian SFSR, Soviet Union
- Genres: Post-punk; new wave; synth rock; folk rock; jangle pop
- Years active: 1981–1991; 2012; 2019–present
- Labels: AnTrop; Yanshiva Shela; Melodiya; Maschina
- Spinoff of: Palata No. 6; Piligrimy
- Members: Yuri Kasparyan; Igor Tikhomirov; Alexander Titov
- Past members: Viktor Tsoi; Georgy Guryanov; Aleksei Rybin; Oleg Valinsky
- Website: kino.band
- Logo

Kino (Russian: Кино, lit. 'cinema' or 'film', pronounced [kʲɪˈno]) is a Russian rock band formed in Leningrad (now Saint Petersburg) in 1981. The band was co-founded and headed by Viktor Tsoi, who wrote the music and lyrics for almost all of the band's songs, until his death in 1990. Over the course of eight years, Kino released over ninety songs spanning over seven studio albums, as well as releasing a few compilations and live albums. During the days of the Soviet Union, the band's music was also widely circulated in the form of bootleg recordings through the underground magnitizdat distribution scene. Viktor Tsoi died in a car accident in 1990. Shortly after his death, the band broke up after releasing their final album, consisting of songs that Tsoi and the group were working on in the months before his death.

In 2019, the band announced a reunion with concerts planned in late 2020 for the first time in 30 years; however, they were later postponed to 2021 due to the COVID-19 pandemic. The band has been active since 2019.

== History ==
=== Early years ===
Kino was formed in 1981 by the members of two earlier groups from Leningrad (now Saint Petersburg), Palata No. 6 and Piligrimy. They initially called themselves Garin i Giperboloidy (Russian: Гарин и гиперболоиды, lit. 'Garin and the Hyperboloids') after Aleksei Tolstoi's novel The Hyperboloid of Engineer Garin. The group consisted of Viktor Tsoi, guitarist Aleksei Rybin, and drummer Oleg Valinsky. They began rehearsing, but Valinsky was drafted and had to leave the band. In the spring of 1982, they began to perform at the Leningrad Rock Club and met with the influential underground musician Boris Grebenshchikov. It was around this time that they changed the band's name to Kino. The name was chosen because it was considered short and "synthetic", and the band members took pride in that it had only two syllables and was easy to pronounce by speakers all over the world. Tsoi and Rybin later said that they had the idea for the name after seeing a bright cinema sign.

=== 45 and the beginning of a career (1982) ===
Kino released their debut album, 45, in 1982. Since the band only consisted of two members, Grebenshchikov suggested that members of his band Aquarium assist Kino in recording the album. These included cellist Vsevolod Gakkel, flautist Andrei Romanov, and bassist Mikhail Faynshteyn-Vasilyev. Since they had no drummer at the time, they used a drum machine. This simple line-up made the album sound lively and bright. Lyrically, it resembled earlier Soviet bard music for its romanticism of city life and the use of poetic language. The album consisted of thirteen songs and was named 45 in reference to its length. The group's popularity was rather limited at the time, so the album was not considered much of a success. Tsoi later stated that the record had come out crudely and he should have recorded it differently.

=== In between (late 1982–1984) ===
In late 1982, Kino attempted to record a second album at the studio of the Maly Drama Theatre, along with drummer Valery Kirilov (who later joined Zoopark) and sound designer Andrey Kuskov. However, Tsoi lost interest in the project and they ceased recording. In the winter of 1983, they played several shows in Leningrad and Moscow and were sometimes accompanied by Aquarium drummer Pyotr Troshchenkov. Rybin was replaced by rehearsal bassist Maksim Kolosov and later, guitarist Yuri Kasparyan. According to Grebenshchikov, Kasparyan was a poor guitar player initially, but he quickly progressed and eventually became the second most important member of Kino. With Kolosov and Kasparyan, Kino performed their second concert at the Leningrad Rock Club.

The band's responsibilities were split evenly between Tsoi and Rybin. Tsoi was in charge of the creative component, writing music and lyrics, while Rybin did all the administrative work, such as organizing concerts, rehearsals and recording sessions. In March 1983, a serious conflict broke out between them, the culmination of multiple differences between the two musicians. Tsoi was particularly annoyed that Rybin performed his songs, and not his own writing, while Rybin did not like Tsoi's unconditional leadership of the group. Eventually, the two stopped talking, and Rybin left the band.

The only audio document from this period was a bootleg called 46, which consisted of demos of new songs by Tsoi. These songs continued with the romanticism of 45, but also had darker undertones. Tsoi dismissed the recording as "only a rehearsal tape," but many fans viewed it as Kino's second record. Nonetheless, it has never been recognized as a legitimate album by the band.

=== Nachalnik Kamchatki and growing fame (1984–1985) ===
In 1984, Kino released their second album, Nachalnik Kamchatki (Russian: Начальник Камчатки). The title was inspired by Tsoi's job as a boiler plant operator (nachalnik means 'chief' or 'boss,' and Kamchatka is slang for 'a very faraway place' – but also a folk name for the boiler plant where Tsoi worked, now his museum), as well as a reference to the 1967 Soviet comedy Nachalnik Chukotki. Again, Grebenshchikov served as a producer and brought many of his friends to help with the record. Among them were Alexander Titov (bass guitar), Sergey Kuryokhin (keyboards), Pyotr Troshchenkov (drums), Vsevolod Gakkel (cello), Igor Butman (sax), and Andrey Radchenko (drums). Grebenshchikov played a small keyboard instrument. The album was minimalist in style, with sparse arrangements and usage of fuzz effects on Kasparyan's guitar. "The album was electric and somewhat experimental in sound and form. I cannot say that the sound and style orientation turned out the way we'd like to see it, but from the point of view of the experiment, it looked interesting," said Tsoi later.

After the album was finished, Tsoi formed the electric section of Kino, which included Kasparyan on lead guitar, Titov on bass guitar, and Georgy Guryanov on percussion, and in May 1984, they began to actively rehearse a new concert program. Kino then performed at II Festival at the Leningrad Rock Club, where they were highly acclaimed and began to take off in popularity. The group soon became famous and started to tour the Soviet Union. In the summer, they participated in a critically acclaimed joint performance with Aquarium and other bands held in the Moscow suburb of Nikolina Gora under the close supervision of the state security forces. In 1985, Kino released their third album, Eto ne lyubov....

=== Noch and nationwide recognition (1985–1986) ===
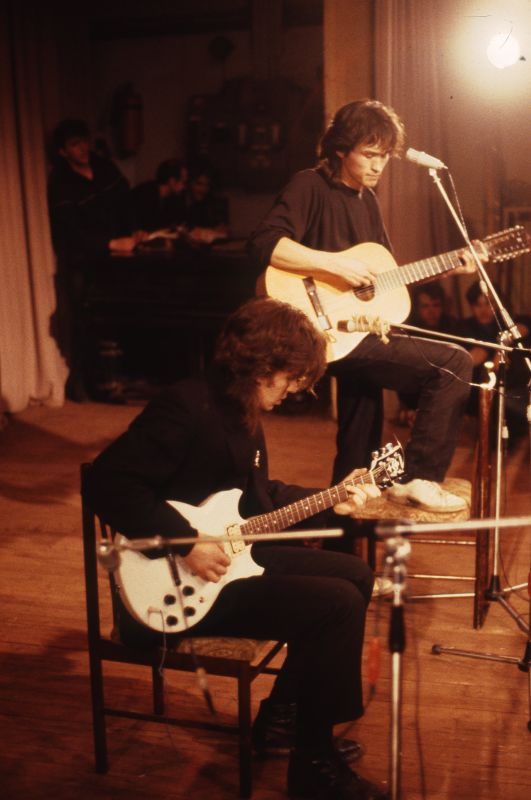
Viktor Tsoi and Yuri Kasparyan at a concert in Leningrad, 1986.

In early 1985, Kino attempted to record another album, but Tsoi did not like producer Andrei Tropillo's interference in his work, and the project was left unfinished.

In November 1985, Titov decided to leave Kino in favour of Aquarium, of which he was also a member. He was replaced by jazz guitarist Igor Tikhomirov, who remained part of Kino's "classic lineup" until its end.

In January 1986, Tropillo released the unfinished record the band had recorded in his studio a few months earlier. The album, entitled Noch (Russian: Ночь, lit. 'Night') sold two million copies, making the group famous far beyond the rock community. However, the band had an extremely negative view of the release of this album. They received very little money from the sales of the record, and the underground rock press also criticized the album.

In the spring the band performed at the IV Festival Rock Club, where they received the grand prize for the song "Dalshe deystvovat budem my" (Russian: «Дальше действовать будем мы», lit. 'From Now On, We'll Be in Charge'). In the summer, they traveled to Kyiv to make a film with Sergei Lysenko called Konets Kanikul, "End of Summer Break." The film consists of a story line that sequences three of Kino's songs followed by the aforementioned song. In July, they performed at the Moscow Palace of Culture Engineering along with Aquarium and Alisa. Afterwards, the three bands released a compilation called Red Wave. The album sold 10,000 copies in California, becoming the first release of Soviet rock music in the West.

=== Gruppa krovi and critical acclaim (1986–1988) ===
From 1986 to 1988, Tsoi began to act in more movies and continued to write songs for Kino. The film The Needle (Russian: Игла, romanized: Igla), which he starred in, brought the band to even more prominence, and their 1988 album Gruppa krovi (Russian: «Группа крови», lit. 'Blood type') brought them to the pinnacle of their popularity. Kasparyan had married the American Joanna Stingray, who brought the group high-quality equipment from abroad. Thus, the technical equipment Kino used on this album far exceeded the equipment they had access to on their earlier albums, and it was their first record technically on par with European and American recordings. Russian journalist Alexander Zhitinsky called Gruppa krovi one of the best works of Russian music and said that it elevated Russian rock to a new level. The album was also acclaimed in the West, where it was released in 1989 by Capitol Records and lauded by American critic Robert Christgau. At the request of a U.S. fan the song "Gruppa krovi" was even translated by Tsoi and recorded with English lyrics by the band in Moscow in January 1988. Noch was also released on vinyl by Melodiya in 1988.

Kino performed on central television in the Soviet Union, and Assa, a 1987 film featuring Russian rock, showed Tsoi performing "Khochu peremen!" (Russian: «Хочу перемен», lit. 'I want change!') in front of a crowd of thousands. After this, Kino's popularity swept the country, and their music captured the minds of the Soviet youth of the 1980s.

=== Zvezda po imeni Solntse and global popularity (1989–1990) ===
Soon after gaining national fame, Kino began to receive invitations to perform from all over the Eastern Bloc and even beyond. They participated in a charity contest in Denmark to raise money for relief from the earthquake in Armenia and performed at the largest French rock festival in Bourges and at the Soviet-Italian festival Back in the U.S.S.R. in Melpignano. In 1989, they travelled to New York and held a premiere of The Needle, as well as a small concert.

In 1989, they released Zvezda po imeni Solntse (Russian: Звезда по имени Солнце, lit. 'A Star Called Sun'), which was lonely, introspective, and sad, despite the fame the band was enjoying. Kino appeared on the popular Soviet television program Vzglyad and attempted to record several video clips. While Tsoi was unsatisfied with them and insisted that they be removed, they were nonetheless shown frequently on television.

Around this time, the band decided to create a separate pop band to perform their more light-hearted songs to balance the pop songs that helped them gain popularity with Tsoi's introspective musings.

In 1990, Kino performed at Luzhniki Stadium, where the organizers lit the Olympic flame, which had been lit only four times before (at the Moscow Olympics in 1980, the World Festival of Youth and Students in 1985, the Goodwill Games in 1986, and the Moscow International Peace Festival 1989.)

=== The Black Album and the end of Kino (1990) ===
In June 1990, after finishing a lengthy touring season, the band decided to take a short break before recording an album in France. However, on 15 August, Tsoi died in a car crash near Tukums while returning from a fishing trip.

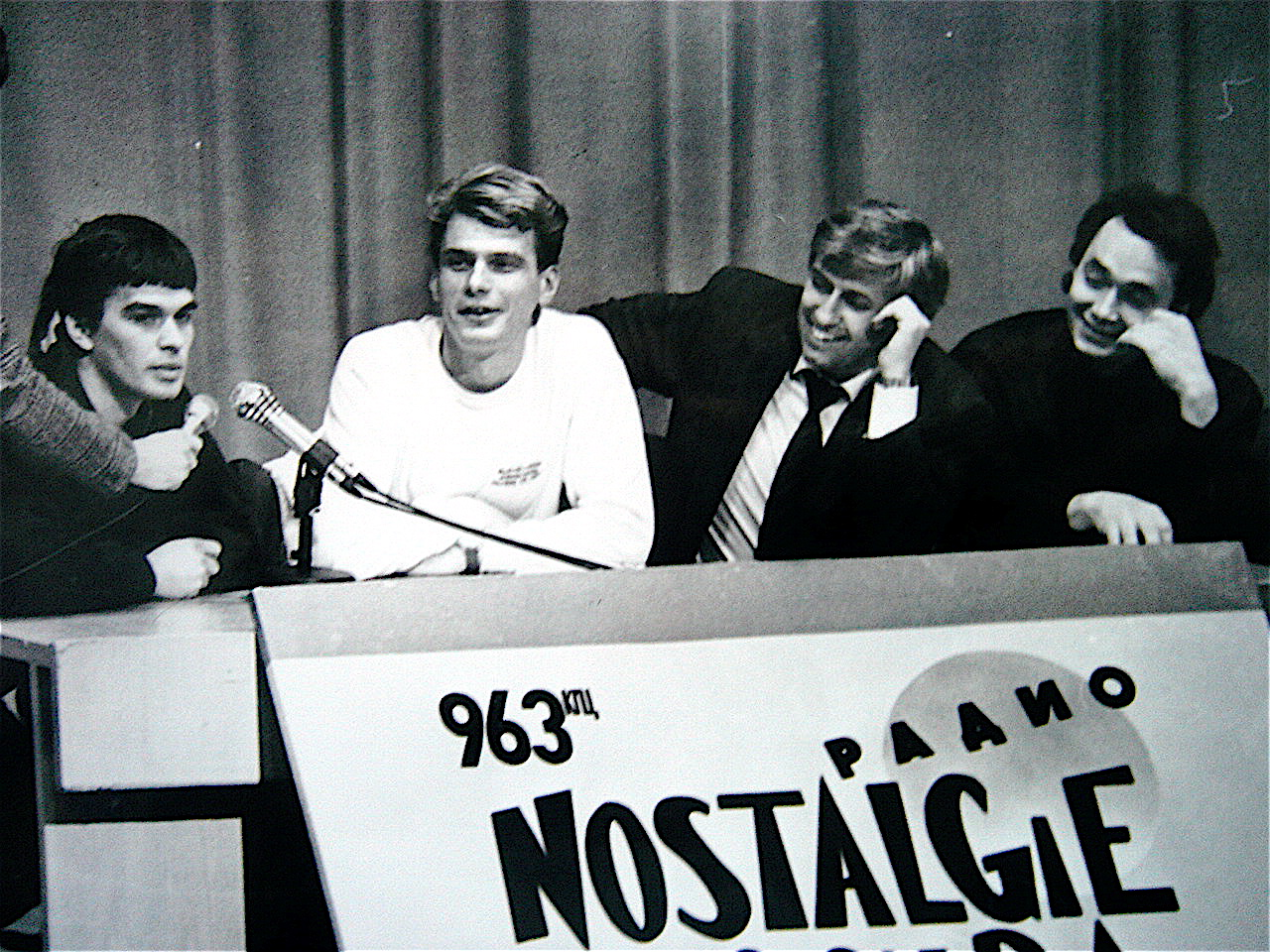
Presentation of The Black Album in Moscow on January 12, 1991 (Yuri Kasparyan, Yevgeny Dodolev, Yuri Aizenshpis, Igor Tikhomirov)

Before Tsoi died, they had recorded several songs in Latvia, and the remaining members of Kino finished the album as a tribute to him. While it had no official title, it is often called The Black Album (Russian: Чёрный альбом, romanized: Chorny albom) in reference to its all-black cover. It was released in December 1990, and shortly after, Kino and others close to Tsoi held a press conference announcing the end of the band.

On this original vinyl issue, no track names were given, just the text, producer: Yuri Aizenshpis and a photo of the band. A lyric sheet was included, but the songs were just titled 1 to 8. The track names were revealed on the 1994 CD reissue by Moroz.

=== Reunions (2012, 2019–present) ===
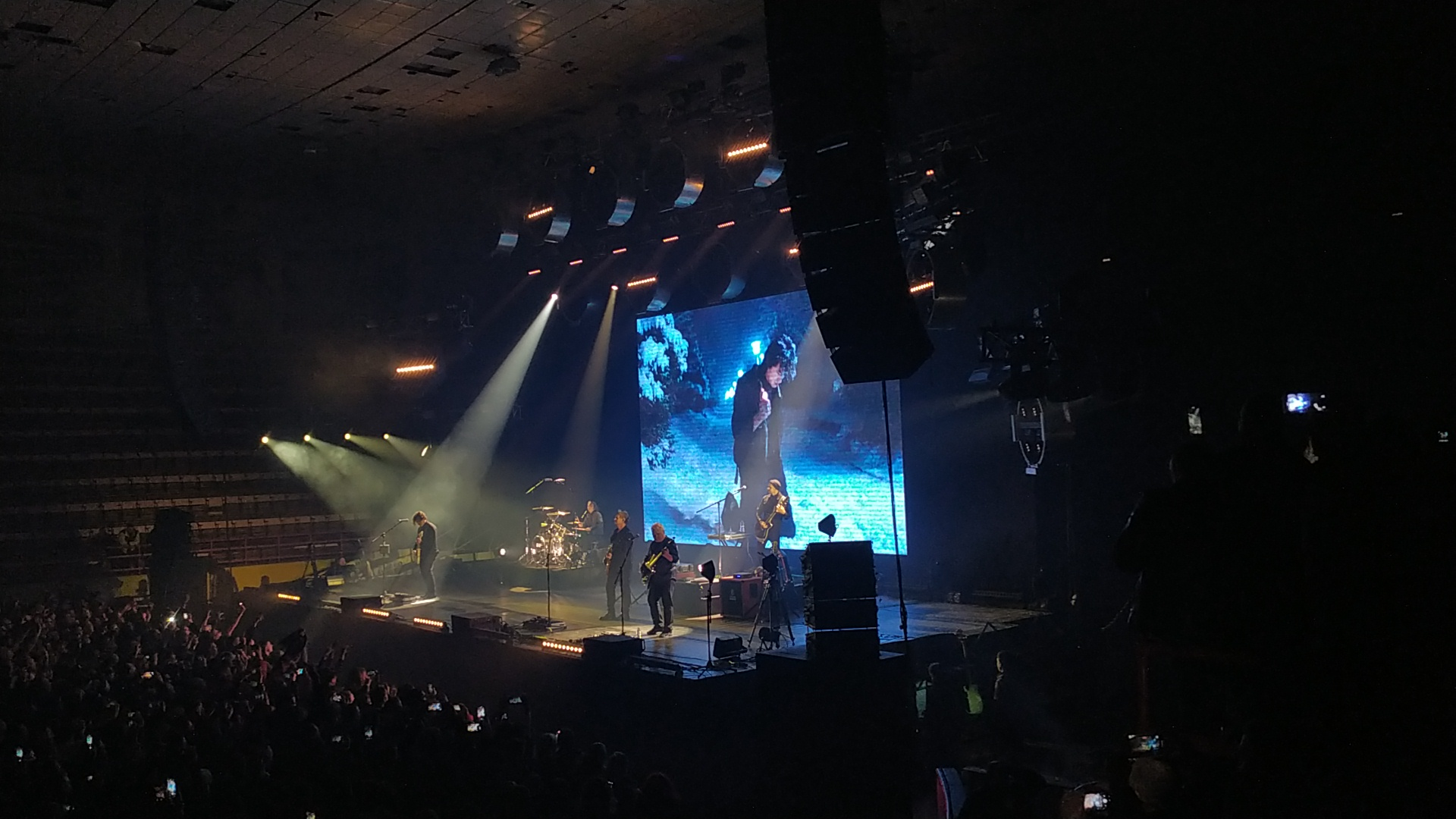
The band performing in February 2023.

In 2012, on what would have been Tsoi's fiftieth birthday, the band briefly reunited to record the song "Ataman", which had originally been intended to feature on The Black Album. The song was not featured on the album at its release because the only existing recording of the song contained only low-quality vocals. This was the final release of the band and the final song to feature Georgy Guryanov, who died on 20 July 2013, from complications of hepatitis C, liver and pancreatic cancer, at the age of 52.

In 2019, the band announced a reunion with concerts planned in the fall of 2020 for the first time in 30 years. It would feature the band's guitarist Yuri Kasparyan and bass guitarists Alexander Titov and Igor Tikhomirov. It would also use Viktor's voice, digitized from original multichannel recordings, and be accompanied by a "unique video sequence". Viktor Tsoi's son, Alexander, became the band's producer. However, due to the COVID-19 pandemic, the concerts were postponed to 2021.

In March 2021, a live album called Kino v Sevkabele (Kino in Sevkabel) came out, and a year later, on 22 December 2022, an album named 12_22, was released on platforms.

A remake of the album Eto ne lyubov... was released on 15 March 2024, featuring original vocals and a newly recorded instrumental

On October 2, 2025, Молнии Индры (Lightning of Indra), a remake of songs from the album Nachalnik Kamchatki, together with additional tracks from Noch, Lyubov – eto ne shutka, and more, was released, featuring the original vocals with brand-new instrumentals.

In April 2026, Kino announced that it would perform seven new concerts in Canadian and American cities, including Toronto, New York, Miami, San Francisco, Los Angeles, Seattle, and Calgary.

== Style ==
Kino's musical style has generally been described as post-punk and new wave. All Kino songs were written by Viktor Tsoi. His lyrics are characterized by a poetic simplicity. The ideas of liberty were present (one song was named "Mother Anarchy") but, on the whole, the band's message to the public was not overly or overtly political, except for the recurring theme of freedom. Their songs largely focused on man's struggle in life and dealt with such overarching themes as love, war, and the pursuit of liberty. When asked about the social and political themes of his music, Tsoi said that his songs were works of art and he did not wish to engage in journalism.

== Legacy ==
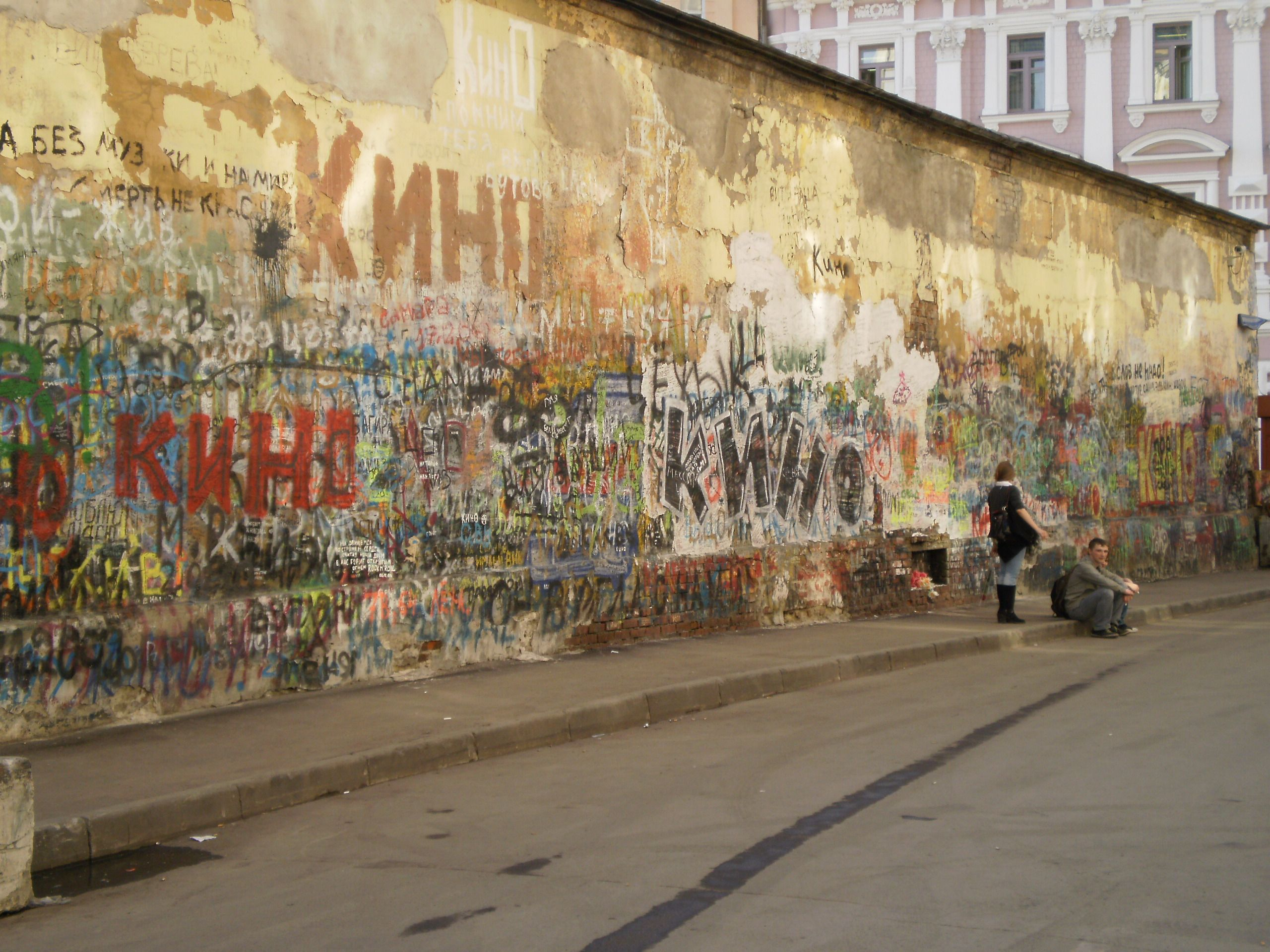
The Tsoi Wall covered with messages from Kino fans.

As one of the first Russian rock bands, Kino greatly influenced later bands. On 31 December 1999, Russian rock radio station Nashe Radio announced the 100 best Russian rock songs of the 20th century based on listener votes. Kino had ten songs in the list, more than any other band, and "Gruppa Krovi" took the first place. The Russian newspaper Komsomolskaya Pravda listed Kino as the second most influential Russian band ever (after Alisa.) In addition, "Gruppa Krovi" was listed as one of forty songs that changed the world in a 2007 Russian-language edition of Rolling Stone.

Tsoi's simple, relatable lyrical style was very accessible to Kino's audience and helped them gain popularity throughout the Soviet Union. While not excessively political, their music coincided with Mikhail Gorbachev's liberal reforms such as glasnost and perestroika. Additionally, the Western style of their music increased the popularity of Western culture in the Soviet Union.

Kino has remained popular in modern Russia, and Tsoi, in particular, is a cult hero. The group's popularity is referred to as "Kinomania," and fans of the group are known as "Kinophiles." In Moscow, there is a Tsoi Wall, where fans leave messages for the musician, and the boiler room where Tsoi once worked is a place of pilgrimage for fans of Russian rock.

Kino has maintained a niche but devoted following in the West despite there being little English language material relating to the band. The band's music was notably popular amongst the internet subculture known as "Doomers", with it often being remixed to have a slowed tempo.

In the summer of 2011, in celebration of the 30th anniversary of Kino in the village of Morske, Crimea, on the place where in 1981 stood the tent of the future musicians of the band by the Sudak rock club - a memorial sign in the form of a guitar with a plaque was installed.

The phrase 'Цой жив', meaning 'Tsoi lives' or 'Tsoi is alive' is popular among their fans.

== Band members ==
Current members

- Yuri Kasparyan (Юрий Каспарян) – lead guitar, backing vocals (1983–1991, 2012, 2019–present)
- Alexander Titov (Александр Титов) – bass (1984–1985, 2019–present), backing vocals (2019–present)
- Igor Tikhomirov (Игорь Тихомиров) – bass (1985–1991, 2012, 2019–present), backing vocals (2019–present)

Current touring and session musicians

- Dmitry Kezhvatov (Дмитрий Кежватов) – acoustic guitar, backing vocals (2020–present)
- Oleg Shuntsov (Олег Шунцов) – drums (2020–present)

Former members

- Viktor Tsoi (Виктор Цой) – lead vocals, acoustic guitar, rhythm guitar (1981–1990; his death), bass (1981–1983)
- Aleksei Rybin (Алексей Рыбин) – lead guitar (1981–1983)
- Oleg Valinsky (Олег Валинский) – drums (1981)
- Georgy Guryanov (Георгий Гурьянов) – drums, backing vocals (1984–1991, 2012; died 2013)

Former touring and session musicians

- Boris Grebenshchikov (Борис Гребенщиков) – guitar, keyboards, glockenspiel, backing vocals, piano
- Alexey Vishnya (Алексей Вишня) – guitar, percussion
- Maxim Kolosov (Максим Колосов) – guitar
- Yuri Lebedev (Юрий Лебедев) – guitar
- Dmitry Anashkin (Дмитрий Анашкин) – guitar
- Igor Borisov (Игорь Борисов) – guitar
- Andrey Krisanov (Андрей Крисанов) – bass (died 2018)
- Vsevolod Gakkel (Всеволод Гаккель) – cello, drums
- Sergey Kuryokhin (Сергей Курёхин) – keyboards (died 1996)
- Dmitry Pavlov (Дмитрий Павлов) – keyboards
- Andrey Sigle (Андрей Сигле) – keyboards
- Pyotr Troshchenkov (Пётр Трощенков) – drums
- Andrey Radchenko (Андрей Радченко) – drums
- Valery Kirilov (Валерий Кирилов) – drums (died 2024)
- Yevgeny Guberman (Евгений Губерман) – drums (died 2012)
- Mikhail Faynshteyn-Vasilyev (Михаил Файнштейн-Васильев) – percussion (died 2013)
- Roman Barinov (Роман Баринов) – drums, percussion
- Sergey "Afrika" Bugayev (Сергей Бугаев) – drums, percussion
- Andrey Tropillo (Андрей Тропилло) – flute, backing vocals, whistle, conch (died 2024)
- Dyusha Romanov (Дюша Романов) – flute, backing vocals (died 2000)
- Igor Butman (Игорь Бутман) – saxophone
- Joanna Stingray (Джоанна Стингрей) – backing vocals
- Aleksandr Lushin (Александр Лушин) – backing vocals
- Viktor Lushin (Виктор Лушин) – backing vocals

Timeline

== Discography ==
Studio albums

- 45 (1982)
- 46 (1983)
- Nachalnik Kamchatki (1984)
- Eto ne lyubov... (1985)
- Noch (1986)
- Gruppa krovi (1988)
- Zvezda po imeni Solntse (1989)
- The Black Album (1990)

Re-recording albums

- Le Dernier Des Héros (1989)
- 12_22 (2022)
- Eto ne lyubov (Remake 2024) (2024)
- Molnii Indry (2025)

Concert albums

- Kino v Sevkabele (2021)
