= Yuri Kasparyan =

Soviet rock musician

- Юрий Каспарян
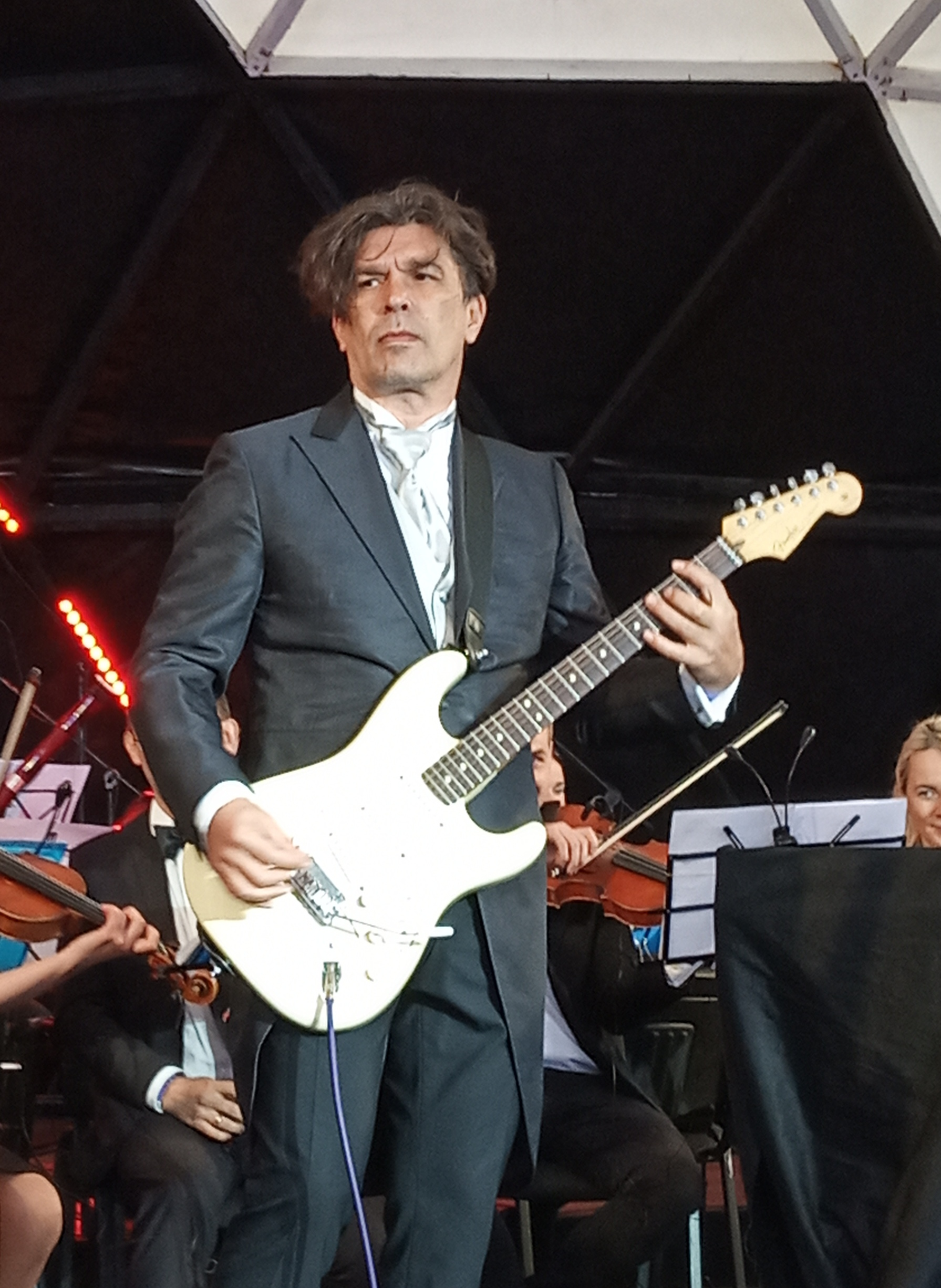
- Kasparyan in 2019
- Born: 24 June 1963 (age 63); Simferopol, Ukrainian SSR, Soviet Union
- Occupations: Guitarist; composer
- Years active: 1983-present
- Spouse: Joanna Stingray (m. 1987; div. 1991)
- Musical career
- Genres: Post-punk; new wave; gothic rock; punk rock
- Instrument: Guitar
- Label: RDM

Yuri Dmitriyevich Kasparyan (Russian: Юрий Дмитриевич Каспарян, born 24 June 1963) is a Russian musician best known for his time as the guitarist of the Soviet rock band Kino and as a member of Vyacheslav Butusov's group U-Piter.

== Early life ==
Kasparyan was born on 24 June 1963 in Simferopol, to entomologist Dmitry Kasparyan, who was of Armenian origin, and biologist Irina Guslits, who was of Russian-Jewish origin. In 1964, his family moved to Leningrad, where he grew up. From 1970 to 1977, he studied cello at a children's music school in Pushkin. But after getting interested towards Western rock music, he preferred to play guitar. In the late 1970s, he played in various student band groups.

== Music career ==
In early 1983 he met Viktor Tsoi. Having become his main associate and close friend, he began to participate in rehearsals and recordings, and later became the lead guitarist of Kino until 1990. According to musician Boris Grebenshchikov, Kasparyan was a poor guitar player initially, but he quickly progressed and eventually became the second most important member of Kino.

From 1983 to the early 1990s, he took part in concerts and recordings, including music for films of the band Pop-Mechanics by Sergey Kuryokhin. From 1986 to 1989 he took part in performances and recordings of songs by Joanna Stingray. In the spring of 1987, together with the members of the bands Novye Kompozitory and Kino, he recorded the album Start. In the late 1980s, along with Kino, he toured extensively within the republics of the USSR, as well as Europe and the United States. In autumn 1990, he was baptized and took the name 'George'. As of present, he only uses the name as a pseudonym.

Following the death of Viktor Tsoi in a car accident in August 1990, Kino broke up after releasing their final album, consisting of songs that Tsoi and the group were working on in the months before his death. Kasparyan left the stage for several years and studied esotericism and philosophy. He worked with the art group Atrium-Alfavit by Sergey de Rocambole as a composer until 1999. He wrote music for a number of conceptual projects, such as Taranavtika and Artikulyatsiya. He also recorded the instrumental album Klyuchi Drakona. He also experimented with combining conceptual format with rock and pop music.

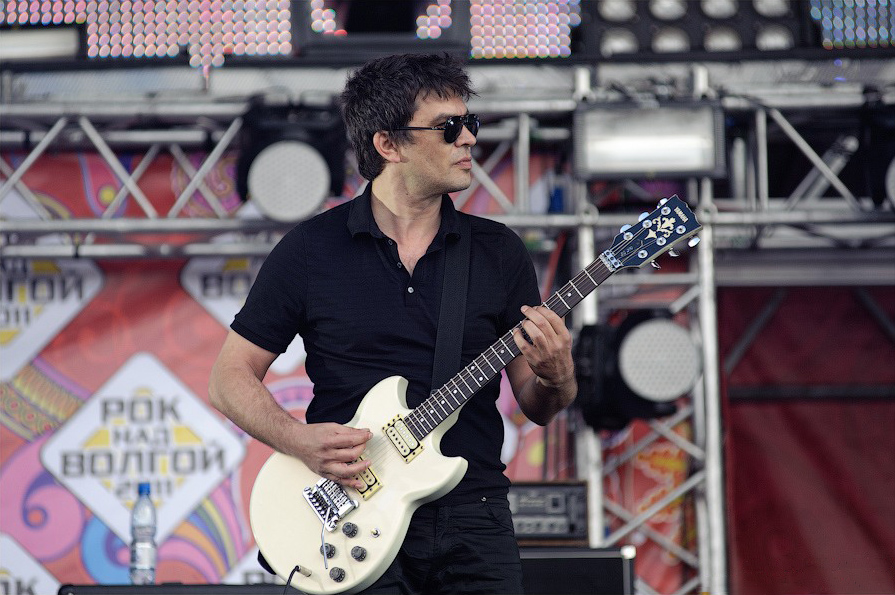
Kasparyan at the Rock on the Volga festival, playing his often used Yamaha SG-200 (2011)

In 1997, Kasparyan, Vyacheslav Butusov, and their mentor Sergey de Rocambole recorded a joint album entitled NezakonNoRozhdenny AlKhimik doktor Faust – Pernaty Zmey. From 1999 to 2001, Kasparyan worked on the Zvezdnyy Ublyudok project with Butusov and Igor Tikhomirov.

In September 2001, Kasparyan and Butusov founded the band U-Piter. In 2005, a selection of Kino songs appeared in their repertoire.

In December 2010, the first concert of the Simfonicheskoye Kino took place. In 2014, he was included in the Music category of Sobaka magazine's "Top 50 Most Famous People of St. Petersburg" list.

On 26 February 2017, after its final Siberian-Ural tour, U-Piter formally disbanded. In the summer of 2017, Kasparyan founded the funk-disco group CHIC Project. Since December 2017, he has been part of Ronin, which was founded by Viktor Tsoi's son Aleksandr.

== Personal life ==
In 1987 he married Joanna Stingray (born: Joanna Fields), an American singer and socialite who helped to popularize Soviet and post-Soviet rock culture in the West during her time in the Soviet Union. They divorced in 1991.

Kasparyan currently resides in St. Petersburg.
