= Alexander Titov (rock musician) =

Russian rock musician (born 1957)

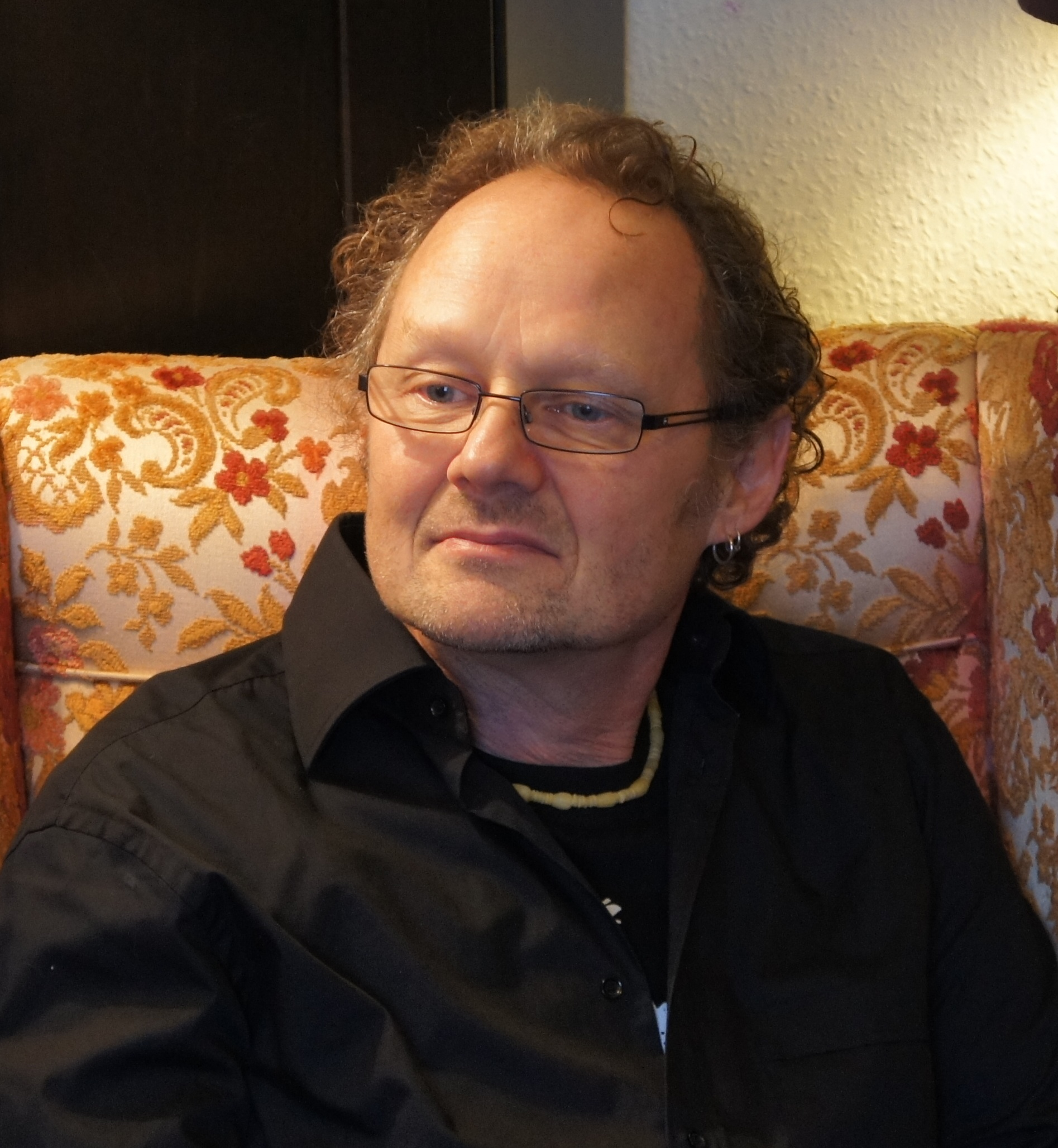

Background information
- Genres: rock music
- Instruments: bass
- Member of: Aquarium

Alexander Valentinovich Titov (Russian: Алекса́ндр Валенти́нович Тито́в; born 18 July 1957) is a Russian rock musician, known for his role as bassist of the band Aquarium, a position previously held by Fan (Michael Feinstein-Vasiliev). He has also performed with the bands Avgust, Pop-Mekhanika, and Kino. He was born in Leningrad.

Titov immigrated to the United Kingdom in 1996, and afterwords started working in sound recording, founding his own company entitled Red Book Music to do so. Alexander Titov is married to British musician and linguist Elena Titov. They have two children, Anna and Catherine.

Since rejoining Aquarium in 2008, Titov has remained an active member of the band, performing on studio recordings and international tours with Boris Grebenshchikov's current lineup.

In 2019, Titov reunited with Kino as one of the band's surviving members for the group's revival project. Since then, he has participated in reunion tours and new studio and live releases alongside Yuri Kasparyan and Igor Tikhomirov, using Viktor Tsoi's original vocal recordings together with newly recorded instrumental performances.

== Discography ==
=== With Aquarium ===
Alexander Titov joined Aquarium in 1983, replacing Mikhail ("Fan") Feinstein as the band's bassist. His first recorded appearance with the group was on the song "Vremya Luny" ("Time of the Moon") from Radio Africa. He was a member of Aquarium from 1983–1989, again from 1992–1996, and rejoined the band in 2008, remaining an active member of the current lineup.

- Radio Africa (1983)
- Day of Silver (День Серебра) (1984)
- Children of December (Дети Декабря) (1986)
- Ten Arrows (Десять стрел) (1986)
- Equinox (Равноденствие) (1987)
- Our Life from the Point of View of Trees (Наша жизнь с точки зрения деревьев) (1988)
- Radio Silence (Boris Grebenshchikov solo album) (1989)
- Favorite Songs of Ramses IV (Любимые песни Рамзеса IV) (1993)
- Sands of Petersburg (Пески Петербурга) (1994)
- Kostroma mon amour (1994)
- Navigator (1995)
- Snow Lion (Снежный лев) (1996)
- Psi (1999)
- Zoom Zoom Zoom (2005)
- White Horse (Лошадь белая) (2008)
- Pushkinskaya, 10 (Пушкинская, 10) (2009)
- Arkhangelsk (2011)
- Salt (2014) – bass on selected tracks.
- Piesni Nelyubimykh (Песни нелюбимых) (2016)
- Symphonia BG (2017)
- Thor (Тор) (2020) – bass on "Boy-Baba" and "For Those In Love".
- House of All Saints (Дом всех святых) (2022)
- Songs of Bards (Песни Бардов) (2022)
- Bogrukinog (БОГРУКИНОГ) (2023)
- New Silk Road (Новый шёлковый путь) (2024)
- Strange News from a Distant Star (Странные новости с далёкой звезды) (2026) – bass and vocals.

=== With Kino ===
Titov was Kino's bassist from 1984 to 1985, performing on the albums Nachalnik Kamchatki, Eto ne lyubov..., and Noch. In 2019 he rejoined Kino along with Yuri Kasparyan and Igor Tikhomirov as part of the band's reunion project. The reunited group performs with restored original vocal recordings of Viktor Tsoi combined with newly recorded instrumental arrangements.

==== Studio and live releases with the reunited Kino ====
- Kino v Sevkabele (Кино в Севкабеле) (2021, live)
- 12_22 (2022)
- Eto ne lyubov (Remake 2024) (Это не любовь (Remake 2024)) (2024)
- Molnii Indry (Молнии Индры) (2025)
