= AnTrop =

Russian record label

- Founded: 1979; 47 years ago
- Founder: Andrei Tropillo
- Distributors: self-distribution, Melodiya
- Genre: Various
- Country of origin: USSR, Russia
- Location: St. Petersburg
- Official website: antrop.net

AnTrop (Russian: «АнТро́п») is a Russian record label and production center founded by Andrei Tropillo. The name of the label is made up of the first letters of his first and last name.

AnTrop was established unofficially in 1979 as an art laboratory and a recording studio. The first high-quality recordings of Russian rock groups such as Mashina Vremeni, Aquarium, Kino, Alisa, and Nol were recorded and published in Tropillo's studio.

== History ==
In 1976, Andrei Tropillo first attempted to set up a small record factory in a room rented from the Geophysics department of Leningrad State University. He eventually replaced his plans for setting up a record factory with plans to build a recording studio. Throughout the late 1970s, Tropillo managed bands and staged concerts, using the money earned from organizing concerts to buy technical equipment for sound recording.

Tropillo took a part-time job supervising a sound recording program and giving guitar lessons at the Second House of Pupils and Pioneers in Okhta in order to gain access to the institution's studio facilities. Under the auspices of the House of Pioneers, he was also able to acquire discarded hardware from other institutions in order to equip the studio. When the pupils left for the evening and summer holidays, Tropillo invited local rock musicians to record in the studio. Akvarium and Mify were the first groups to be recorded in Tropillo's studio.

From 1980 to 1981, a studio collective started to form at AnTrop, consisting of musicians who were interested in recording work and able to step in at short notice when band members didn't show up. While most bands at the time had stable line-ups for concerts, musicians moved freely between bands in the recording studio. Sergey Kuryokhin was one of the musicians who regularly came to the AnTrop studios and contributed to recordings.

In 1987, Tropillo was hired by the Leningrad branch of the state record label Melodiya. In his new position, he released several of the albums previously recorded in the AnTrop studio as LPs, but was not able to invite bands to make new recordings.

While at Melodiya, Tropillo took advantage of the copyright laws of that time to release classic albums of Western rock bands such as The Beatles and Led Zeppelin. On the records themselves, there was a note that the recording was used for broadcasting from the radio, which, according to the Soviet law of that time, removed the copyright issue for commercial use. On the records of The Beatles, for example, it was generally stated that the record was "from the collection of Nikolai Vasin".

The cover art for the AnTrop releases of Western rock albums tended to differ from the original. Names were transliterated into Cyrillic or even translated into Russian, and images were often subtly changed. The cover of the AnTrop release of Led Zeppelin IV features Dmitry Shagin, a member of the art group, Mitki. Tropillo and Vasin's faces appear in the back row on the cover of the AnTrop release of Sgt. Pepper's Lonely Hearts Club Band. On the AnTrop release of Abbey Road, John Lennon was depicted barefoot instead of Paul McCartney.

In 1993–1994, Tropillo released records under the name Santa Records.

In 2011, the AnTrop production center was threatened with eviction from its premises on the territory of the former Leningrad Record Plant. On 2 May 2011, the "AnTrop-Help!" charity concert was held at the Sergey Kuryokhin Contemporary Art Center in St. Petersburg. Boris Grebenshchikov, Andrei Makarevich, Oleg Garkusha, and Padla Bear Outfit were among the musicians who performed to support Tropillo.

== See also ==
- Magnitizdat
- Cassette culture
