= Boris Grebenshchikov =

Russian musician (born 1953)

Boris Grebenshchikov Борис Гребенщиков
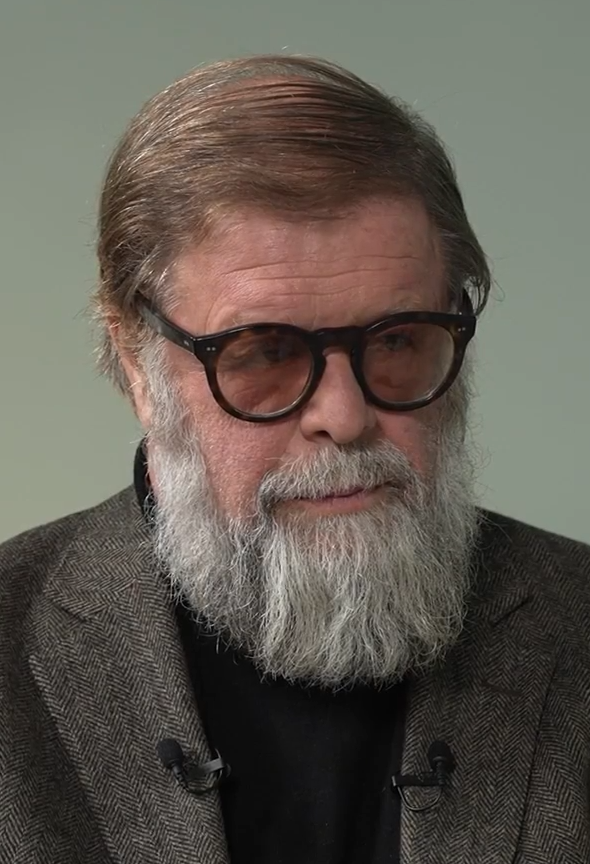
- Grebenshchikov in 2023

Background information
- Also known as: BG
- Born: Boris Borisovich Grebenshikov; 27 November 1953 (age 72); Leningrad, Russian SFSR, Soviet Union
- Genres: Rock; reggae; folk
- Occupations: Singer-songwriter; musician
- Instruments: Vocals; guitar; harmonica; keyboards; metallophone; tambura
- Years active: 1972–present
- Website: bg-aquarium.com
- Awards: Order "For Merit to the Fatherland" (4th class)

Boris Borisovich Grebenshchikov (Russian: Борис Борисович Гребенщиков; born 27 November 1953) is a prominent member of the generation which is widely considered to be the "founding fathers" of Russian rock music. He is the founder and lead singer of the band Aquarium which has been active since 1972. Grebenshchikov is frequently referred to as BG (Russian: БГ; pronounced "Beh-Geh"), after his initials.

== Early years (1953–1979) ==
Grebenshchikov was born on 27 November 1953, in Leningrad, now St. Petersburg. In 1972, he founded the band Aquarium with his childhood friend Anatoly "George" Gunitsky as a postmodern theatrical endeavor that included poetry and music.

Grebenshchikov was accepted into Leningrad State University. Due to his musical activities, he started missing exams and failing classes. Grebenshchikov eventually received a graduate degree in applied mathematics. Inspiration from The Beatles and Bob Dylan transformed Aquarium into a low-fi electric blues band that moonlighted in acoustic reggae.

The Communist Party of the Soviet Union regime routinely suppressed experiments in non-standardized self-expression as a matter of policy, so decent recording facilities were out of reach. The several two-track recordings hacked out over those years, such as Temptation of St. Aquarium (Iskushenie Svyatogo Akvariuma), Count Diffusor's Fables (Pritchi grafa Diffuzora), Menuet for a Farmer (Menuet zemledel'tzu), and a motley bag of "singles" were of unprofessional quality but showcased his interest in Oriental thought and mysticism that eventually became his trademarks.

In 1976, Grebenshchikov also recorded of his first solo album S toy storony zerkal'nogo stekla (Beyond the Mirror Glass) and a double album with Mike Naumenko titled All Brothers-Sisters (Vse brat'ya - sestry).

== Classical years (1980–1988) ==
In 1980, Artemy Troitsky, the first public Russian rock critic, invited Aquarium to perform at the Tbilisi Rock Festival.

The festival was a state-sanctioned attempt to control the Russian rock music movement, but the group's performance caused a near riot and was wildly out of line with the Soviet officials’ expectations. A covert KGB-bound report caused Grebenshchikov to lose his day job and membership in Komsomol.

As Western rock music was still officially banned at the time, Aquarium started giving unsanctioned underground concerts at their friends’ apartments, while their music was reaching wider audience among the Soviet youth through bootlegged cassette tapes. During this time, all music had to be vetted by Soviet censors, and only officially sanctioned bands were allowed to perform in public or record in professional recording studios.

The first Aquarium music available in the West was in 1986 when a double album entitled RED WAVE, 4 UNDERGROUND BANDS FROM THE USSR appeared in record stores in the U.S. Besides Aquarium, Kino, Strange Games, and Alisa were recorded on a four-track machine, smuggled out of the country, and released by a small record label from Hollywood.

By the time Aquarium disbanded amid internal discord in 1991, they had 11 official records under their belt.

== Going West (1988–1990) ==
Perestroika had ushered in a new era of opportunity for rock musicians. In 1989, Grebenshchikov released Radio Silence, produced by Dave Stewart of Eurythmics fame. Radio Silence featured covers of Alexander Vertinsky's "China" amid songs by Grebenshchikov, including a song written to Sir Thomas Malory's Death of King Arthur. Annie Lennox, Billy MacKenzie, and Chrissie Hynde helped out, as did several of Grebenshchikov's bandmates from Aquarium. The single "Radio Silence" was his biggest hit outside of Russia, reaching number 7 on the Billboard Hot Modern Rock Chart in the United States in August 1989.

He issued another English-language album, Radio London, in 1996, which consisted of demos made in 1990 and 1991.

== Returning East (1991–1996) ==
Grebenshchikov returned to Russia and came out with a Russian album (Russkiy al'bom), backed by the eponymous BG Band, in 1992.

The Aquarium album Favorite songs of Ramses the 4th (Lyubimye pesni Ramzesa IV) was mostly filler, and Archive vol 4 was all outtakes. The band's next three albums are effectively Grebenshchikov's solo albums published under the band's brand. Navigator, Snow lion (Snezhniy lev), and Hyperborea have a stylized Russian feel.

== Back to basics (1997–2019) ==
His 1997 album Lilith is still mostly Russian in lyrical theme but is recorded by way of a chance meeting with his idol Dylan's former backing group, The Band.

His 1999 album Psi features an interpretation through a post-modernistic lens with use of keyboard samplers. His 2002 album Sister Chaos (Sestra Haos), 2003 album Fisherman's songs (Pesni rybaka), and 2005 album ZOOM ZOOM ZOOM had Armenian, Indian, and African influences respectively, particularly from Jivan Gasparyan.

In 2014 he released Salt, "one of the best albums of Grebenshchikov’s long career, an astonishing, visceral piece of work that more than lives up to its moniker: earthy, vital, biting, life-enhancing".

== Radio "Aerostat" ==
Since 2005, Grebenshchikov has had a weekly radio program on Russian radio station Radio Rossii titled Aerostat (Russian: Аэростат). It is presented as "author's program of Boris Grebenshchikov" and he is the creator and speaker. Aerostrat is about alternatives in music and the music not played on today's radio despite its artistic value and originality. Grebenshchikov states that it is mostly independent music which would "otherwise would not be played at all." Songs played on Aerostat vary from 1960s and 1970s rock (e.g., The Beatles, Bob Dylan) to reggae, new wave, alternative rock, electronica, punk, world music, jazz, classical, and avant-garde. As of April 2019, more than 700 shows have been created and broadcast, each approximately 46 minutes long. The track lists and the scripts of all programs are available at official site of Aquarium and Grebenshchikov.

== Religion and mysticism ==
Grebenshchikov is known as a student of religion and mysticism. He has translated several Hindu and Buddhist scriptures into Russian, travelled the Orient widely, and made friends with various spiritual celebrities.

Grebenshchikov's published translations of Buddhist and Hindu texts:

- Chökyi Nyima Rinpoche (son of Tulku Urgyen Rinpoche) Bardo Guidebook – "source material for the Tibetan Book of Living & Dying also known as Tibetan Book of the Dead Bardo Thodol", in 1995.
- Tulku Urgyen Rinpoche Repeating Words of the Buddha – "the essential points of spiritual practice, inseparable from everyday life", in 1997.
- Tulku Urgyen Rinpoche Rainbow Painting – "addressing the topics of practices of accumulating and purifying to facilitate unification of view and conduct", in 1999.
- Shibendu Lahiri Kriya yoga – "authentic teachings and techniques of Kriya Yoga", in 2003.
- The Katha Upanishad, Upanishad belonging to the Yajur Veda, in 2005.

== Opposition to the Russian invasion of Ukraine ==
On 5 October 2022, Grebenshchikov appeared on BBC Hardtalk talking about his opposition to the Russian invasion of Ukraine, his self-imposed exile to London, and his involvement with Dave Stewart to produce an antiwar record.

In June 2023, a Moscow court ordered Grebenshchikov to pay 50,000 rubles in fines for alleged "discreditation of the Russian armed forces", related to an interview Grebenshchikov gave on the Israeli television station Channel 9. Grebenshchikov was later declared a foreign agent by the Russian Ministry of Justice.

In March 2026, it became known that Grebenshchikov had received British citizenship.

== Production ==
Over the years of his career, Grebenshchikov has written more than 500 songs. Additionally, he has recorded cover albums on material from Alexander Vertinsky (Songs of A.Vertinsky (Pesni A.Vertinskogo)) in 1994 and Bulat Okudzhava's (Songs of B.Okudzhava (Pesni B.Okudzhavy)) in 1999, two albums of mantra music with Gabrielle Roth and the Mirrors, (Refuge in 1998 and Bardo in 2002), and an album of electronica versions of Aquarium songs from late 1970s – early 1980s with the Russian duo Deadushki.

== Albums ==
=== Prehistory albums of BG and Aquarium ===
- Temptation of the Holy Aquarium (1974)
- Minuet to the farmer (1974)
- Parables of Count Diffuser (1975)
- On the other side of the mirror glass (1976)
- All brothers are sisters (1978) with Mike Naumenko

=== Aquarium Studio and Live albums ===
- Blue album (1981)
- Triangle (1981)
- Electricity (1981)
- Acoustics (1982)
- Taboo (1982)
- Radio Africa (1983)
- Ichthyology (1984)
- Silver Day (1984)
- Children of December (1986)
- Ten Arrows (1986)
- Equinox (1988)
- Black Rose Is an Emblem of Sorrow, Red Rose Is an Emblem of Love (1990)
- Archive (1992)
- Feudalism (2007)
- Our life from the point of view of trees (2010)
- Notes on Flora and Fauna (2010)
- Dates and prices (2012)
- The Secret History of Beekeeping (2012)

=== Aquarium 2.0 ===
- Library of Babylon (1993)
- Favorite songs of Ramses IV (1993)
- Sands of St. Petersburg (1994)
- Kostroma mon amour (1994)
- Navigator (1995)
- Snow Lion (1996)
- Hyperborea (1997)

=== Aquarium 3.0 ===
- Ψ (1999)
- Territory (2000)
- Sister Chaos (2002)
- Songs of a fisherman (2003)
- ZOOM ZOOM ZOOM (2005)
- Careless Russian tramp (2006)
- White horse (2008)
- Pushkinskaya, 10 (2009)
- Day of Joy (2010)
- Arkhangelsk (2011)
- Aeronautics in the company of sphinxes (2012)
- Aquarium + (2013)

=== Aquarium 4.0 ===
- Songs of the Unloved (2016)
- Grass Doors (2017)
- Thor (2020)
- House of All Saints (2022)

=== Solo albums ===
- Russian Album (1991)
- Songs by Alexander Vertinsky (1994)
- Chubchik (1996)
- Lilith (1997) with The Band
- Boris Grebenshchikov and Deadushki (1998) with Deadushki
- Refuge (1998) with Gabrielle Roth
- Songs by Bulat Okudzhava (1999)
- Bardo (2002) with Gabrielle Roth
- No words (2004)
- Salt (2014)
- Vremya N (2018)
- The Sign of Fire (2020)
- Hear me, good one (2020)
- Tribute (2021)

=== English albums ===
| Title | Album details | Charts |
| Title | Album details | US |
|---|---|---|
| Radio Silence | Released: 1989; Label: Columbia; Format: LP, CD | 198 |
| Radio London | Released: 1996 | |

== Singles ==
| Year | Title | Chart positions | | | | Album |
| Year | Title | US Hot 100 | US Modern Rock | US Mainstream Rock | UK | Album |
|---|---|---|---|---|---|---|
| 1989 | "Radio Silence" | – | 7 | 44 | – | Radio Silence |

== Bibliography ==
- Гаккель В. Аквариум как способ ухода за теннисным кортом. – М.: Сентябрь, 2000.
- Гребенщиков Б. Б. Правдивая автобиография Аквариума. (Письмо Артемию Троицкому, 1980 год.)
- Гребенщиков Б. Б. Краткий отчёт о 16-ти годах звукозаписи. – 1997.
- Рыбин А., Кушнир А., Гребенщиков Б., Соловьёв-Спасский В. Аквариум. Сны о чём-то большем... – М.: Нота-Р, 2003.
- Троицкий А. Рок в Союзе: 60-е, 70-е, 80-е… – М.: Искусство, 1991. – 203 с – ISBN 978-5-210-02476-3.
