= Sergey Chubraev =

Russian collector, cultural expert and curator (born 1972)

- Сергей Чубраев
- Born: April 18, 1972 (age 54); Leningrad, USSR
- Citizenship: Soviet Union → Russia
- Occupations: cultural expert, curator

Sergey Alexandrovich Chubraev (Russian: Сергей Александрович Чубраев; born May 18, 1972, Leningrad, USSR) is a Russian collector, cultural expert, and curator of the musical and artistic archive of the Leningrad Underground from the second half of the 20th century.

== Biography ==
He was born in 1972 in Leningrad, USSR. His mother was a library manager, and his father worked as a specialist in equipment calibration for atomic submarines at a defense enterprise. After his parents divorced, Sergey stayed with his mother; later, she remarried a doctor of physical and mathematical sciences.

He studied at School No. 89 in the Kalinin District of Leningrad. After finishing the 8th grade, he entered a medical college at the Leningrad Sanitary and Hygienic Medical Institute.

From 1990 to 1992, he worked in an experimental forensic DNA fingerprinting laboratory at the Bureau of Forensic Medical Examination.

Since the late 1990s, he has worked as a coordinator for architectural and design projects and as a project manager in various construction companies and architectural firms. At the same time, he studied in the evening department of the Faculty of Art Studies at St. Petersburg State University of Culture (graduated in 2001).

In 2005 and 2006, he served as co-producer for the short films Blood and Per Rectum, directed by Pyotr Fyodorov. The films received awards at the International Independent Film Festival "Clean Dreams" (Russian: "Чистые грёзы"): Blood won Best Parody in Domestic Cinema, while Per Rectum was awarded for the Total Contradiction of Form and Content.

From 2005 to 2007, he worked at Condé Nast (Moscow) as a photo producer for magazines such as Vogue, Playboy, Marie Claire, Cosmopolitan, and others.

Chubraev has been passionate about rock music since his youth, particularly "Leningrad rock" and especially the work of Pop-Mechanics. Since 2003, he began collecting artifacts related to the life and work of Sergey Kuryokhin including memorabilia such as video and audio recordings, photographs, posters, tickets, concert costumes, musical instruments, decorations, letters, manuscripts, personal belongings, etc. As part of this project, he conducted about two hundred interviews, visited ten cities including Helsinki, Berlin and Paris, and collected over a thousand exhibits. In 2017, the archive was transferred to the Garage Museum of Contemporary Art.

After transferring Kuryokhin's collection, he shifted his focus to creating an archive of the Leningrad Rock Club. Over two years, he gathered several thousand documents and artifacts related to its activities, including its original charter.

From 2012 to 2015, he assembled an extensive collection of artifacts related to the life and work of Oleg Karavaychuk, with whom he collaborated and who was also his friend. In 2022, this collection was acquired by the Garage Museum of Contemporary Art.

Subsequently, he began collecting exhibits from the underground culture in Leningrad and Moscow from 1952 to 1991. This collection includes materials related to the activities of the Philological School of Poets (Russian: "Круг Красильникова"), Joseph Brodsky, Sergey Dovlatov, Café Saigon; bands such as Kino, Aquarium, Zvuki Mu, Zoopark; Society of Experimental Visual Art; Timur Novikov and the New Artists; New Academy of Fine Arts; Soviet hippie culture; as well as collections of mail art works; samizdat; Moscow conceptualism; and "records on bones".

In 2020, he worked on systematizing Alexander Lipnitsky's archive and that of Zvuki Mu.

In December 2020, he wrote his autobiography titled Chronicles of My Underground (Russian: "Хроники моего андеграунда"), which was first published by the French publishing house Nouveaux Angles. In 2021, this book became a finalist in the national book design competition Zhar-Kniga (Russian: "Жар-книга").

In June 2026, he published a previously unknown original recording of Viktor Tsoi performing the song "Deti Minut" ("Children of Minutes"), which had been considered lost for more than 30 years. The recording was made at a party hosted by Georgy Guryanov by Sara Åkerren, the daughter of the Consul General of Sweden to the USSR. Chubraev discovered the tape in her personal archive and restored it in late 2025. The search for and discovery of the recording became the subject of the documentary "Privet Karlu Gustavu" ("Greetings to Carl Gustaf"), directed by Andrey Airapetov, with an original concept and production by Sergey Chubraev.

== Exhibitions, seminars, performances ==
From 1999 to 2001, he was a member of the group of artists Private Curators. He participated in a series of action art episodes, exhibitions, and performances.

In 2005, he won a grant from the Pro Arte Foundation to hold a solo exhibition by Dmitry Sirotkin titled Flower for Persephone at the necropolis in Alexander Nevsky Lavra; he served as the curator of the exhibition. Subsequently, he curated several artistic projects by Sirotkin, including those held in the collections of the Klingspor‑Museum (Germany), the Museum of Book Art and Typography (Offenbach am Main, Germany), the Saxon State Library (Dresden, Germany), the State Hermitage Museum (St. Petersburg, Russia), and private collections.

In 2008, he curated the art exhibition Rembrandt by Pavel Pepperstein in St. Petersburg at Dmitry Semyonov's gallery. That same year, he participated in the International Music Festival SKIF-12, providing video materials about Sergey Kuryokhin from his collection.

In 2009, he was featured in a conference during the opening of the Institute of New Man at the Loft Project Etazhi in St. Petersburg and at a film festival organized by the PVA society at the Griboedov club with a seminar titled Kuryokhin's Code.

In 2011, his work was presented at:

The seminar Sergey Kuryokhin: The Mad Mechanics of Russian Rock at Loft Project Svetoch (St. Petersburg, together with A. Kushnir);

The round table of Sergey Kuryokhin: The Mad Mechanics of Russian Rock (Moscow, participants: S. Letov, A. Troitsky, Y. Saprykin, A. Kushnir, S. Chubraev);

The first exhibition Museum 'Artist's Book' (St. Petersburg, Erarta);

The television program Tsarskosel'skie Vstrechi (Russian: "Царскосельские встречи") (St. Petersburg, TV channel "ВОТ!").

In 2012, he participated in a round table and presentation of new albums featuring Sergey Kuryokhin's music as part of the 7th Moscow International Open Book Festival at Central House of Artists (together with A. Gavrilov, S. Zharikov, A. Kushnir). He organized a seminar titled Kuryokhin and the End of Musical Postmodernism at the gallery GEZ-21 (St. Petersburg).

In 2013:

He was a participant in the exhibition Realities of Russian Rock in St. Petersburg, Perm, and Chelyabinsk;

He collaborated on the exhibition Time of Bells (Russian: "Время колокольчиков") at the Lumiere Brothers Gallery (Moscow);

He was part of the exhibition ASSA: The Last Generation of Leningrad Avant-Garde at the Academy of Arts (St. Petersburg).

In 2014:

He participated in the exhibition The Musician is Always a Guest (St. Petersburg);

He took part in the Let It Be exhibition at the GEZ-21 gallery (St. Petersburg);

He was involved in the memorial exhibition for Georgy Guryanov titled Rough Style GG (St. Petersburg);

He authored and curated the memorial exhibition for Sergey Kuryokhin titled Ashusheniya Drugova (Russian: «Ащушения Другова») at Erarta Museum of Contemporary Art as part of the parallel program for the international biennale Manifesta-10 (St. Petersburg).

In 2015:

He was featured in the exhibition Joseph Brodsky at Mitki Gallery (St. Petersburg);

He took part in the exhibition Archive M dedicated to Vlad Mamyshev-Monroe at Moscow Museum of Modern Art;

He was involved in the exhibition New Composers at New Academy of Arts Gallery (St. Petersburg).

In 2016:

He participated in the exhibition Notes From The Underground/ Art and Alternative Music In Eastern Europe 1968—1994 at Museum of Art (Łódź, Poland);

He took part in the exhibition Oblich'ya (Russian: «ОбличьЯ») at St. Petersburg Museum of Theatre and Music Arts.

In 2017, he was a participant in the memorial exhibition for Yevgeny Yufit titled Descend at New Academy of Arts Gallery (St. Petersburg).

In 2021, he participated in the exhibition 40th Anniversary of the Rock Club, held at Russian Museum (St. Petersburg).

In 2022, he took part in exhibitions Viktor Tsoi: The Path of a Hero (Moscow Manege) and The Image of Kino band in Culture and Art: Viktor Tsoi’s 60th Anniversary (St. Petersburg, Dyagilev Museum).

In 2023, he organized an exhibition titled Samizdat: The Music That Didn’t Exist (St. Petersburg, KGallery).

In 2024, he participated in an exhibition organized for Sergey Kuryokhin’s 70th anniversary during the music festival Stereoleto (St. Petersburg).

He gives lectures at various cultural institutions, museums, and foundations. He also conducts guided tours.
