= Gruppa krovi =

- Rerelease cover

Studio album by Kino
- Released: 5 January 1988
- Recorded: 1986–1987
- Studio: Red Wave (Leningrad)
- Genres: Post-punk; new wave; alternative rock
- Length: 47:19
- Label: Self-released via magnitizdat
- Producer: Aleksei Vishnya

Kino chronology
Noch (1986)	Gruppa krovi (1988)	Posledniy geroy (1989)

Professional ratings
Review scores
Source	Rating
Allmusic	4.5/5 stars
Robert Christgau	B+

Gruppa krovi (Russian: Группа крови, lit. 'Blood type' [ˈɡrupːə ˈkrovʲɪ]) is the fifth studio album by Soviet post-punk band Kino, first released in 1988. Released at the height of Perestroika and Glasnost, together with a crime thriller titled The Needle released in the same year starring lead vocalist Viktor Tsoi, it would go on to be the band's most popular album both inside and eventually outside the Soviet Union, with songs from the album, including the title track, commonly being listed among top 100 lists of Russian music.

Work on the album began in 1987. Most of the recording took place at Georgy Guryanov's apartment, and was completed at the studio of Alexey Vishnya. The sound of the recording is overstated compared to the albums, thanks to the use of modern reverb in the studio.

The album was highly praised by critics upon release and continues to be considered a notable event in the history of Russian music. In 1999, Nashe Radio published list of "100 Best Songs of Russian Rock in the 20th Century", including several songs from this album and giving the song "Blood Type" the first place.

== Background ==
At the end of 1985, bass player of the group Alexander Titov, who was also a member of Aquarium, discovered that it was difficult to work with 2 bands at the same time, and consequently left Kino in favour of Aquarium. The remaining musicians rarely commented on Titov's departure, considering it to be a betrayal to some extent. According to Kino drummer Georgy Guryanov, Titov did not fit into their team and always considered himself a member of Aquarium, working with Tsoi's band only as a guest musician.

To prevent his departure from affecting the group's performance at the planned Leningrad Rock-Club festival, Titov offered Igor Tikhomirov, a former member of the art-rock band "Jungle" as a replacement. Following Tikhomirov's arrival, the group's lineup and morale would settle, with the composition of the band remaining unchanged until Tsoi's death in 1990.

Before work began on Gruppa krovi, the band attempted to record a separate album. However, due to noise complaints and the perceived lack of a cohesive style, production was postponed indefinitely. Despite Viktor Tsoi's desire to destroy recordings from the album, the rest of the band entrusted the recordings to Alexey Vishnya, who, together with Marianna Tsoi, released the recordings along with demos recorded from 1982 and 1986 for an abandoned album named Posledniy geroy (not to be confused with the 1989 album of the same name) under the title of "Unknown Songs" (Russian: Неизвестные песни) in 1992. In 2020, Maschina Records remastered and released the recordings for the album separately as "Love is no joke" (Russian: Любовь — это не шутка!).

== Production ==
Recording of the album took place alongside the filming of "Assa", primarily within Georgy Guryanov's apartment. Thanks to a broader range of instruments acquired via Joanna Stingray, the wife of guitarist Yuri Kasparyan, the band was able to experiment with various styles and genres, including reggae, funk, and hard rock.

== History ==
After the Soviet release, the album was released in the United States in 1989 by Capitol Records. The album's title song "Gruppa krovi" is about the constant selfless struggle for what is right, as well as a kind of anti-war anthem. At the request of a U.S. fan, the song was also translated and recorded in English as "Blood Type".

== Album cover ==
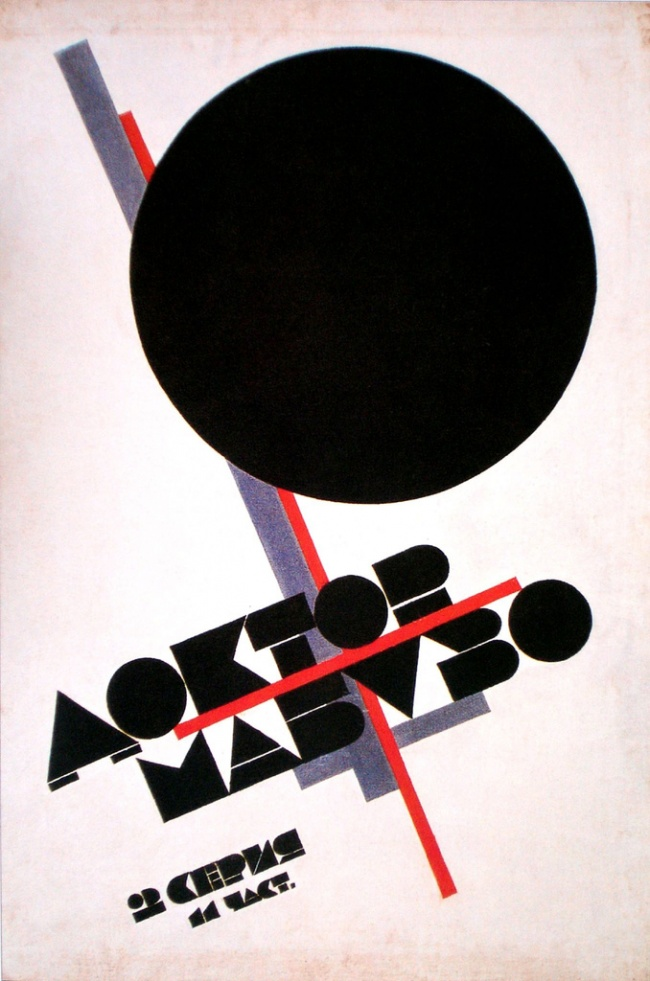
The Russian theatrical poster for Dr. Mabuse the Gambler, which influenced the album cover's design.

Gruppa krovi’s album cover is reminiscent of the post-war Russian avant-garde and pre-war suprematist movements, and the art of artists such as El Lissitzky. It is directly inspired by the poster of the Russian release of Fritz Lang’s 1922 silent film Dr. Mabuse the Gambler (German: Dr. Mabuse, der Spieler, Russian: Доктор Мабузе, игрок, romanized: Doktor Mabuze, igrok) by Kazimir Malevich.

== Re-release ==
- In 1989, Gold Castle Records released the album on CD, audio cassette, and vinyl in the U.S.
- On 21 November 1989, Victor Musical Industries released the remastered album (with the 9th track "Prokhozhiy") on CD in Japan.
- In 1991, Russian Disc released the album on vinyl for the first time in the Soviet Union.
- In 1993, General Records re-released the album on CD without digital remastering in Austria.
- In 1995, MF Records, a label owned by Mikhail Fridman, re-released the album on CD without digital remastering in Germany.
- In 1996, Moroz Records re-released the digitally remastered album (with the 9th track "Prokhozhiy") on CD and audio cassette.
- In 2003, Moroz Records reissued the album as part of a box set collection containing 15 CDs.
- In 2012, Moroz Records re-released the album on vinyl.
- In 2019, Maschina Records restored the album from original master tapes and released it on LP, CD and CS along with bonus material.

== In popular culture ==
- "Gruppa krovi" was featured in Grand Theft Auto IV's soundtrack, but was removed in April 2018 after the ten-year license expired.
- American heavy metal band Metallica covered the title track “Gruppa krovi” live at a concert in Moscow's Luzhniki Stadium on July 21, 2019, twenty nine years and a full month after the band had last performed there live before Tsoi's car accident later in 1990.
- A remix of "Gruppa krovi" was used by the video game War Thunder in a trailer for the update "Drone Age".

== Track listing ==
All tracks are written by Viktor Tsoi.

No.	Title	Translation	Length
1.	"Gruppa krovi" (Russian: «Группа крови»)	"Blood Type"	4:47
2.	"Zakroy za mnoy dver', ya uhozhu" (Russian: «Закрой за мной дверь, я ухожу»)	"Close the Door Behind Me, I'm Leaving"	4:17
3.	"Voyna" (Russian: «Война»)	"War"	4:05
4.	"Spokoynaya noch'" (Russian: «Спокойная ночь»)	"Good Night"	6:08
5.	"Mama, mi vse soshli s uma" (Russian: «Мама, мы все сошли с ума»)	"Mama, We've All Gone Mad"	4:08
6.	"Boshetunmay" (Russian: «Бошетунмай»)	"Boshetunmay"	4:09
7.	"V nashih glazah" (Russian: «В наших глазах»)	"In Our Eyes"	3:34
8.	"Poprobuy spet' vmeste so mnoy" (Russian: «Попробуй спеть вместе со мной»)	"Try to Sing Along With Me"	4:36
9.	"Prohozhiy" (Russian: «Прохожий»)	"Passerby"	3:40
10.	"Dal'she deystvovat' budem my" (Russian: «Дальше действовать будем мы»)	"From Now On, it's Our Turn"	3:57
11.	"Legenda" (Russian: «Легенда»)	"Legend"	4:09
Total length:			47:30

== Personnel ==
- Viktor Tsoi – vocals, guitar
- Yuri Kasparyan – lead guitar, keyboards ("Poprobuy spet' vmeste so mnoy")
- Igor Tikhomirov – bass guitar
- Georgiy Guryanov – Yamaha RX-11 drum machine, backing vocals, bass guitar ("Zakroy za mnoy dver', ya ukhozhu", "Mama, my vse soshli s uma", "Poprobuy spet' vmeste so mnoy", "Prokhozhiy")

Additional personnel

- Andrei Sigle – keyboards
- Igor Verichev – backing vocals ("Prokhozhiy")
- Alexey Vishnya – mixing and mastering, backing vocals ("Gruppa krovi")
