= Evgenij Kozlov =

Russian artist living in Berlin (born 1955)

E-E
- Born: Evgenij Kozlov; 1955 (age 70–71); Leningrad, Soviet Union (now St. Petersburg, Russia)
- Education: Public high school No. 190 attached to The Saint Petersburg Art and Industry Academy (formerly Vera Mukhina Institute)
- Known for: Painting, drawing, photography, collages, printmaking,
- Movement: Chaose Art

(E-E) Evgenij Kozlov (Note: Russian: (E-E) Евгений Козло́в, tr. (Ye-Ye) Yevgueni Kozlov, IPA: [jɪvˈɡʲenʲɪj kɐˈzlof]) is a Russian artist living in Berlin. Known chiefly as a founder of the art group "New Artists" (Leningrad, 1982–1989), perhaps the most influential art phenomenon in the Soviet Union in its last decade, he works under the artist's name of E-E which has been his sole signature since 2005. Since 2017, he has been adding People as a second signature to most of his works, stressing the universal character of his approach to art.

In 2007, Maurizio Cattelan, Massimiliano Gioni and Ali Subotnick included Kozlov into the list of 100 “great solitary masters”. Kozlov's works are in the collections of the Russian Museum, Saint Petersburg, Tate Modern, London, Centre Pompidou, Paris, Muzeum Sztuki, Łódź, Aboa Vetus & Ars Nova, Turku, Davis Center, Harvard University, and in other public and private collections.

== Biography ==
=== The Leningrad Period ===
In 1978 Kozlov joined the art group Letopis and then, in 1982, became one of the first members of the New Artists, founded by Timur Novikov, who had also been a member of Letopis. Kozlov regularly participated in the New Artists' exhibitions, first in Leningrad and later, at the end of the 1980s, internationally (US, Sweden, England, Finland, Hungary, etc.). He had his first solo exhibition at Timur Novikov's studio / gallery “ASSA”. The art critic and curator Ekaterina Andreeva points to the influence of his artistic approach on Timur Novikov: “He [Timur Novikov] departed from ‘wildness’ under the influence of Kozlov's strict style".

An important part of Kozlov's large body of work from the 1980s are vivid portraits - provided by his photographs, collages, drawings and paintings - of the artists and musicians allied with the New Artists. Many of them represent the second Russian avant-garde in art and music: Georgy Gurianov, Oleg Kotelnikov, Vladislav Mamyshev-Monroe, Timur Novikov, musicians Sergey Kuryokhin, Viktor Tsoi, the ‘New Composers’ Valery Alakhov and Igor Verichev, among others. To an extent, the camera was for Kozlov the same as a sketchbook for artists of the past in so much as it captured and preserved a moment of inner life for future interpretation.

These pictures, which the author used for paintings, graphic works and collages, are today not only of an intrinsic artistic value, but also, with their coverage of celebrities and events, a rich documentation of artistic life in Leningrad in the 1980s. They have appeared as catalogue covers and in books and magazines. They have also been used as posters for various exhibitions. At the exhibition “Notes from the Underground. Art and Alternative Music in Eastern Europe 1968–1994” (Muzeum Sztuki, Lodz, 2016; Akademie der Künste Berlin, 2018), they represented the protagonists of Leningrad's art and music scene.

==== USA-CCCP-CHINA ====
During the nineteen eighties, Kozlov repeatedly turned his attention to the polarity between Russia and America as a factor in world affairs affecting the spiritual state of the Earth. Approximately 170 paintings, collages, drawings, textile works, handbags, and other objects are documented for this period. It starts with “This Century's Dead Caresses, Up Until… ”(1980), a composition reminiscent both of Kasimir Malevich's interpretation of Russian folk art and of Vladimir Lebedev's poster art, and is brought to a close with the constructivist “Points of Contact”, dating to 1989, which portrays this polarity being overcome. Anticipating the struggle for a tri-polar distribution of forces, Kozlov saw China joining the concert of the world powers – as portrayed in the painting CHINA-CCCP, from 1987, which depicts both of these protagonists as guitarists. The same year, the artist engaged in reworking Soviet symbols such as the star, the hammer, and the sickle, etc. This entailed a certain degree of ‘rebranding’ the logotypes, so as to make them positive. Three of these works, “Star”, "Star. 6 Figures", and “CCCP (USSR) are now in the collection of Tate Gallery, London.

==== Studio RUSSKOEE POLEE ====
Kozlov's studio “Russkoee Polee” (“The Russian Field”, 1989–1991) at No. 145 Fontanka River Embankment was a meeting place for artists, curators, and gallerists. In 1990, the Austrian performance artist Wolfgang Flatz teamed up with Kozlov for a body-painting session; this was filmed for the public by ZDF, the German TV channel. That same year, he saw the Berlin curator Hannelore Fobo visiting his studio. Kozlov settled in Berlin and later married Fobo. At Russkoee Polee, Kozlov created his main cycle of works from the Leningrad period, “Новая Классика” (Novaya Klassika), or “New Classicals”, consisting of six motifs, each painting in a 2x3m format: Love for Man, Love for Woman, Love for the Cosmos, Love for the Earth (two versions, one being in the Collection of Centre Pompidou, Paris.), Love for Work, Love for the Wonderful (two versions). The seventh motif, “Love for God” exists as a draft.

The same year, he began building up a unique collection of art, “2x3m”, inviting Leningrad artists to his studio to produce a work in this format. The initial contributions were made by Oleg Kotelnikov, NIKA (Elena Bogdanova), Ivan Sotnikov, and Vladislav Mamyshev-Monroe. During the night of the 22nd to the 23rd of July 1990, one of the most spectacular exhibitions of Soviet / Russian art took place on Palace Bridge (Дворцовый мост / Dvortsoviy Most), the central part of which opens twice at night. Ivan Movsesyan conceived the concept of turning the southern segment, opening towards the Winter Palace (Hermitage), into a huge exhibition stand of 30 ms height and 27 ms width. It displayed six works from Kozlov's collection “2x3m”, five of Kozlov's own works from the cycle "New Classicals", as well as a number of other works by Kozlov's artist friends.

=== The Berlin Years ===
One of Kozlov's first exhibitions in Germany was “Der Weg der ockerfarbenen Elefanten“ (“The Path Of The Ocre Elephants“) at Kampnagel, Hamburg, in 1991. It was coproduced with the Centre Culturel, Cherbourg where it was shown the same year as “Le Passage des éléphants ocres“. Kozlov's works included three large paintings from his series “New Classicism“ (“Новая классика”) which were characterized in an art journal as “self-contained and yet irritating to such a degree that they would hold their own in any exhibition.”

In 1994, with support from the OTIS company, Hannelore Fobo and Evgenij Kozlov opened “RUSSKOEE POLEE 2” in Berlin; the studio, a 400 m2 factory space, ran until 2008. The dimensions of his studio allowed the artist to develop large projects, such as “Miniatures In Paradise”, 1995, an exhibition at the Siegessäule (Berlin Victory Column) with motives of angels as well as the cities of St. Petersburg and Berlin. Sixteen “miniatures”, original paintings on fabric in a 5 x 2 m format similar to gonfalons, were hoisted on flagpoles around the Großer Stern on June 15, 1995. The exhibition had to be closed after four of the “miniatures” were stolen. During its fourteen years of existence, “RUSSKOEE POLEE 2” played a prominent role on Berlin's cultural landscape. Not only were there solo exhibitions of which Kozlov was one of the artists but it was also a hub for a variety of concerts and fashion shows. The focus of “RUSSKOEE POLEE 2” was on Russian artists but this was not an exclusive policy. In Berlin Kozlov has continued to enlarge his collection “2x3m” which focuses on works of contemporary Russian artists in this very format.

In 1998, Kozlov was commissioned by the Abgeordnetenhaus of Berlin (state parliament of Berlin) to create a portrait of Mikhail Gorbachev for its Gallery of Honorary Citizens. In 1999, he was the artistic director of a project dedicated to ten years of the Fall of the Berlin wall. ‘Chocolate Wall’ was organised by the Italian Festival Eurochocolate, Perugia and took place in Potsdamer Platz, Berlin where under Kozlov's guidance school children painted freely on the chocolate wall. This wall had been built up by Italian pastry chefs; twelve metres long and eight tons in weight it was, like its inspiration, also destroyed.

2003 saw the release of Kozlov's book The Leningrad Album – a selection of 108 erotic drawings from the remaining 256 which had been executed in his youth. A year later the book was given to the curators of the 4th Berlin Biennale Maurizio Cattelan, Massimiliano Gioni, and Ali Subotnick. The drawings made a profound impact on Massimiliano Gioni who selected 150 of them for the exhibition “Ostalgia” at the New Museum, New York in 2011 where they were considered to be “a cornerstone of the exhibition”. After having been appointed curator of the 55th Venice Biennale (2013), Gioni decided to make them part of the main exhibition entitled “The Encyclopedic Palace”. The drawings roused intense interest from the public, and the entire stock was sold out in the gallery shop within the first two days.

In 2008, Kozlov began his large cycle “Century XX”, which is a dedication to the last century. To date, the series consists of more than 450 original graphic works and the same number of so-called “light boxes” which are also drawings but carried out on semi transparent paper.

== Artistic views ==
=== Two Cosmic Systems ===
In 1991, Kozlov wrote a manifesto entitled Dve KosmicheskiEE Sistemy(Two Cosmic Systems). The first system “proposes a view and understanding of art – of how it is admired and enjoyed, its focus and development – according to the laws of the Earth”, while the second, also called the twelfth, “implies a view of creation as a whole from the Cosmos, as if the artist had been born in space and had completed their complete path of development and formation solely in it.” Synthesising both views, “the artist expands the sphere of his or her creation towards Infinity.”

=== CHAOSE ART ===
In 2009, Evgenij Kozlov defined a main trend in contemporary art in the 20th century which has now become universal as “Chaose art” and to which he associates part of his own work. A work is considered “Chaose art” if it is generated through assemblage and montage, without a sketch or outline, without a prior meaning; the artist creates and introduces meaning in the process of creation, whilst simultaneously searching for a new harmony. Kozlov sees this tendency best represented by Wassily Kandinsky, Paul Klee, Joan Miró, Jean-Michel Basquiat, Sigmar Polke, Neo Rauch. The term “chaose” is pronounced like “house”, as it combines “chaos” as “meaning before its emergence” with the “e” of “house” as in house music. The letter “e” therefore stands for the rhythm of this art, since "Chaose Art" evokes an inner movement for both the artist and the viewer. This inner movement leads to a perception of depth and freedom and ultimately on to an awareness of knowledge and confidence in chaos. In a note from 2015, Kozlov specifies this concept further:

Being of the opinion (knowing) that nothing in this world happens by chance – which is what comes out of mathematics, physics and chemistry, etc. – I thereby infer that any microscopic speck within my work of art has not come to be there by chance, even if from the perspective of the viewer it should seem to have arisen as a result of chaos (chaos being the highest expression of harmony).

== Exhibitions (selected) ==
- 1984: АССА-Е-Е, The ASSA Gallery, Leningrad
- 1988: The New from Leningrad, Kulturhuset, Stockholm
- 1990: The First Exhibition on Palace Bridge, Palace Bridge, Leningrad
- 1991: Leninskaya Erotika, Raab Galerie, Berlin
- 1991: Der Weg der ockerfarbenen Elefanten, Internationales Sommertheater Festival, Kampnagel, Hamburg / Le passage des éléphants ocres, Musée du Théâtre de Cherbourg
- 1995: Miniatures in Paradise, Siegessäule, Berlin
- 1995: Absolute carte blanche, Forum Kunst Rottweil
- 2000: Е-Е (cult heroes of the 80s), Petersburg archive and library of independent art, Pushkin street 10, St. Petersburg
- 2005: Transcontinental Nomadenoase, Art Basel Miami Beach
- 2007: The Raw, The Cooked, the Packaged, Museum of Contemporary Art Kiasma, Helsinki
- 2011: Ostalgia, New Museum, New York
- 2012: No barriers. Russian Art 1985 - 2000, The Russian Museum, St. Petersburg
- 2013: Il Palazzo Enciclopedico, la Biennale di Venezia
- 2013: ASSA. The Last Generation of the Leningrad Avant-garde., The Russian Academy of Fine Arts Museum, Saint-Petersburg
- 2013: Blue Velvet – Works from the Matti Koivurinta Foundation Art Collection, Aboa Vetus & Ars Nova, Turku, Finland
- 2015: E-E=mc3, Hannah Barry Gallery, London
- 2016: E-E WEIGHT. SLEEP, Egbert Baqué Contemporary, Berlin
- 2016: Notes from the Underground, Muzeum Sztuki, Lodz, Poland
- 2018: Notes from the Underground, Akademie der Künste, Berlin
- 2018: USA-CCCP-CHINA, Egbert Baqué Contemporary, Berlin
- 2020: Андеграунд 90-х. Художники на танцполе / The 1990s Underground. Artists on the Dance Floor, Yeltsin Centre, Yekaterinenburg
- 2021: Gegen(-)Kollektive, Galerie KUB, Leipzig

== Gallery ==
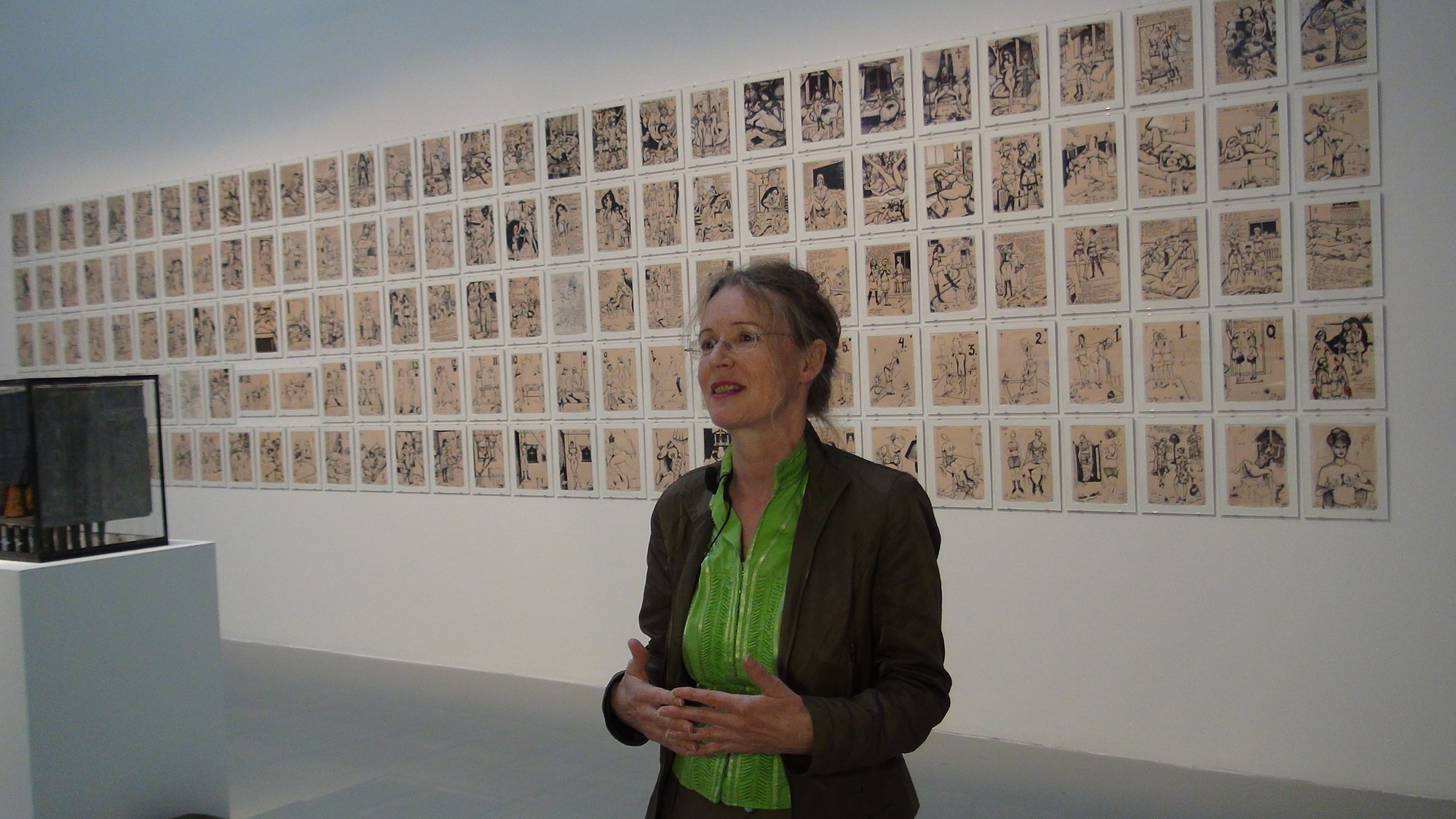
Curator Hannelore Fobo, 55th Venice Biennale, 2013
