= Zakroy za mnoy dver, ya ukhozhu =

Song by Kino

from the album Gruppa krovi
- Language: Russian
- English title: Close the door behind me, I'm leaving
- Written: 1986
- Released: 1988
- Recorded: 1987
- Genre: Post-punk; alternative rock
- Length: 3:58
- Label: Gold Castle Records
- Songwriter: Viktor Tsoi

Music video
- "Закрой За Мной Дверь" on YouTube

"Zakroy za mnoy dver, ya ukhozhu", (Russian: Закрой за мной дверь, я ухожу, lit. 'Close the door behind me, I'm leaving') or simply "Zakroy za mnoy dver" is a song by the Soviet rock band Kino from their sixth studio album, Gruppa krovi (Russian: Группа крови [ˈɡrupːə ˈkrovʲɪ], lit. 'blood type'/'blood group'). The author of the lyrics and music is Viktor Tsoi. The keyboard solo for the recording was played by pianist Andrey Sigle. At concerts, the song was performed in a simplified version without the keyboard solo.

The song earned 58th place among the top hundred Russian rock songs of the 20th century, according to Nashe Radio.

== History ==
According to film director Sergei Lysenko who worked with the band closely while producing his short film "The End of Vacation", the song came about when frontman and lyricist Viktor Tsoi shifted his songwriting style from the "lyrical" songs on prior albums like 45 and Eto ne lyubov... to more socially conscious songs. The song was initially released on a four-song demo tape given to Lysenko for the short film.

In 2000, sound engineer on Gruppa krovi Alexey Vishnya described of the song after performing it in commemoration of the tenth anniversary of Tsoi's death:

"Zakroy za mnoy dver, ya ukhozhu" is actually a song about me. That's why it was easy for me to sing it with the intonations that the author himself put in. He never had his own home and when he had a falling out with Maryasha, he lived either in Moscow with friends, or with Gustav or Kasparyan. I also left my wife and spent six years hanging out with friends."

— Alexey Vishnya

=== Arrangement ===
Band guitarist Yuri Kasparyan stated that Tsoi consciously chose to implement a sense of "heroism" (Note: Russian: героизм) into the arrangements for Gruppa krovi, which influenced the song's arrangement on the album towards an "absolutely danceable" (Note: Russian: абсолютно танцевальный ритм) rhythm in a contradictory minor key.

Pianist Andrey Sigle stated that the final arrangement for the song, like others on the album, was focused on inverting musical norms at the time. He stated that Georgy Guryanov and Igor Tikhomirov each suggested that he insert a Rachmaninov-styled piano piece into the song, resulting in him recording what he called a "completely creepy" keyboard solo. (Note: Russian: совершенно стремное клавишное соло)

=== Remake ===
In 2022, Kino's musicians released a collection of updated versions of the songs of the group "12 22", where pianist Alexander Dubovoy took part in the recording of the song "Zakroy za mnoy dver, ya ukhozhu". On October 20, 2022, a video for the song was presented, which included footage from the film "The End of Vacation".

== Legacy ==
In a Nashe Radio poll released on 31 December 1999, the song earned 53rd place among the top hundred Russian rock songs of the 20th century.

On August 15, 2022, Kino fans gathered at Bogoslovskoe Cemetery in St. Petersburg to commemorate the 32nd anniversary of Viktor Tsoi's death. Participants engaged in impromptu performances of Kino's repertoire, including renditions of "Zakroy za mnoy dver, ya ukhozhu".

== Personnel ==
=== Original version ===
- Viktor Tsoi – vocals, rhythm guitar
- Yuri Kasparyan – lead guitar
- Igor Tikhomirov – bass guitar
- Georgy Guryanov – programming of the Yamaha RX-11 drum machine (main part), backing vocals.
- Andrey Sigle – keyboards

=== Live 2022 ===
- Viktor Tsoi – phonographic vocals
- Oleg Shuntsov – drums
- Yuri Kasparyan – lead guitar
- Igor Tikhomirov – bass guitar
- Alexander Titov – bass guitar
- Dmitry Kezhvatov – rhythm guitar
- Roman Parygin – trumpet
- Alexander Tsoi – mixing
