= Spokoynaya noch =

Song by Kino

from the album Gruppa krovi
- Language: Russian
- English title: Good night
- Written: 1986
- Released: 1988
- Recorded: 1987
- Genre: Post-punk; alternative rock; darkwave
- Songwriter: Viktor Tsoi
- Composers: Viktor Tsoi; Yuri Kasparyan; Georgy Guryanov; Igor Tikhomirov

Music video
- "Спокойная ночь" on YouTube

"Spokoynaya noch" (Russian: Спокойная ночь, lit. 'Quiet Night/Good Night/Peaceful Night') is a rock ballad by the Soviet rock band Kino. Most of the music and lyrics were written by Viktor Tsoi, and the guitar solo was written by Yuri Kasparyan. The song was fully rehearsed and presented at the Leningrad Rock Club Festival in 1986, but was first released on the album Gruppa krovi (Russian: Группа крови [ˈɡrupːə ˈkrovʲɪ], lit. 'blood type'/'blood group') in 1988. Later, the song was released on the disc Acoustic Concert 2 and in the collections Posledniy geroy (Russian: Последний герой, lit. 'The last hero') in 1989, and Istoriya etogo mira (Russian: История этого мира, lit. 'History of this world') in 2000.

The song achieved significant recognition as one of the most highly regarded musical works in Russian rock history, earning 38th place among the top hundred Russian rock songs of the 20th century according to Nashe Radio. The song was covered by the Russian rock band Alisa and Russian musician Ricochet.

== History ==
=== Composition ===
Audio engineer Alexey Vishnya said that the first version of "Spokoynaya noch" was recorded together with songs that were included in the album Eto ne lyubov... (Russian: Это не любовь..., lit. 'This is not love...'). The song emerged during Kino's involvement with the film "The End of Vacation" in 1986. According to film director Sergey Lysenko, Viktor Tsoi composed the song while staying at the Slavutich Hotel in Kiev, drawing inspiration from the city's panoramic views from the tenth floor. The urban landscape reportedly influenced key lyrics, particularly: "I was waiting for this time, and now this time has come. / Those who were silent, stopped being silent. / Those who have nothing to wait for, get into the saddle, / you can't catch them, you can't catch them anymore." (Note: Russian: «Я ждал это время, и вот это время пришло. / Те, кто молчал, перестали молчать. / Те, кому нечего ждать, садятся в седло, / их не догнать, уже не догнать»)

The song's somber, slow-paced early version created what Vishnya described as a tragic, depressing atmosphere. Coincidentally, during these sessions, neighbors requested quiet due to a grandmother's passing in the building. The recording was further marked by technical difficulties when Vishnya's MEZ-62 tape recorder suffered irreparable damage following the session, with its remains later donated to the rock club museum.

The song received its premiere performance in Kiev at an intimate gathering in the House of Scientists, But never went too production during the time. The track underwent full rehearsals before its official public debut at the fourth Leningrad Rock Club Festival in 1986, with Viktor Tsoi providing the primary composition and lyrics while Yuri Kasparyan contributed the guitar solo.

=== Releases ===
Though the song initially premiered in 1986, the song waited two years before its official release on Kino's album Gruppa krovi in 1988. It also appeared on Posledniy geroy, a collection released in France in 1989. The track exists in multiple versions, including both electric and acoustic arrangements, preserved on official concert recordings and unofficial fan bootlegs.

== Interpretations ==
Zufar Kadikov, author of the book In the Footsteps of the Prophet of Light – Deciphering the Songs of Viktor Tsoi, writes: “For those who do not believe in God or the devil, the lyrics of the song will most likely seem like a classic mess or a collection of abstruse quirks... But in this song, the timbre of the voice and the manner of performance are so clear that there are few who will not be touched by it and will not make them think”.

Interpreters of the song believe that the song was influenced by Tsoi's love of nighttime as his favorite time of day, having once described it as having a unique sense of mystery, romance, and mysticism to it. Some also interpret the song as at least partly based around a lamentation of how people, consumed by daily routines, fail to appreciate such unique qualities of night and of life in general.

== Legacy ==
"Spokoynaya Noch" achieved significant recognition as an "anthem" of Russian rock history, ranking 38th in Nashe Radio's list of the top 100 Russian rock songs of the 20th century, as determined by listener votes in December 2000.

The song was covered by the Russian rock band Alisa in an album of Kino covers and on several live albums. On the album "At Shabolovka" prior to performing "Spokoynaya Noch" as the second to last track, frontman Konstantin Kinchev stated: "As long as we are alive, we will always sing this song, because it is very close and dear to us." and ended the song with the words: "Thank you, thank you Tsoi."

The song has been covered and remixed on several tribute albums, such as KINOproby. Rap-tribute (2010) by the group "Pilgrim", “20 Years Without Kino” (2010) by the group U-Piter (with the participation of Vyacheslav Butusov and Yuri Kasparyan), “We Came from Kino” (2017) by Antokha MC and Anton Sevidov, and as part of the LAB project in 2020 by Lev Leshchenko, Therr Maitz, and Ukrainian rap artist Andro. The song was also performed in an instrumental symphonic manner on the album "SimfoniK" (2018) as part of the Simfonicheskoe Kino project, featuring Yuri Kasparyan.

The song was featured in the soundtrack of the 2001 film Sisters directed by Sergei Bodrov, and the 2014 film The Fool directed by Yuri Bykov.

== Personnel ==
- Viktor Tsoi – vocals, rhythm guitar
- Yuri Kasparyan – lead guitar
- Igor Tikhomirov – bass guitar
- Georgy Guryanov – drums
- Andrey Sigle – keyboards
