= Afrika (artist) =

Russian artist (born 1966)

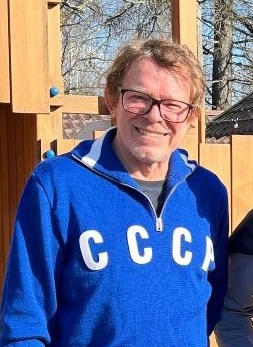
- Born: Sergei Anatolevich Bugaev; 28 March 1966 (age 60); Novorossiysk, Krasnodar Krai, Soviet Union

Sergei Bugaev (born 28 March 1966), more commonly known as Afrika, is a Russian artist.

He was born in Novorossiysk, on the Black Sea, and in the early 1980s moved to Leningrad, where he met and became friends with leaders of the art scene there, such as the painter Timur Novikov and musician Boris Grebenshchikov. Shortly thereafter he adopted the artistic moniker "Afrika" and began working as an artist himself. In 1987 he starred as Bananan, the lead character in the groundbreakingly avant garde film Assa by Russian film director Sergei Solovyov.

Afrika works mainly in performance and installation art. His 1993 project "Krimania" took the form of an initial performance, which involved the artist spending three weeks in a mental institution in Simferopol, Crimea, at the end of which he staged an exhibition for the patients and staff of the hospital.

The second part of the project was a major exhibition at the Museum of Applied Arts in Vienna (MAK), entitled "Krimania: Icons, Monuments, Mazáfaka." The work addresses the issue of collective versus individual identity of the Soviet citizen after the breakup of the Soviet Union.

In 1999 Afrika represented Russia at the 48th Venice Biennale. He currently lives and works in Saint Petersburg, Miami and New York City.

In August 2013, a group of artists from St. Petersburg (Yevgeniy Kozlov, Oleg Maslov, Inal Savchenkov, Oleg Zaika) filed lawsuits against Bugaev, accusing him of illegal possession of 25 of their works from the late 1980s. The works had been missing since the beginning of the 1990s and appeared unexpectedly in the exhibition and exhibition catalogue "ASSA. The Last Generation of the Leningrad Avant-Garde", organized by Sergei Bugaev in May and June 2013 at the state-owned Research Museum of the Russian Academy of Arts, St. Petersburg.

On November 5, 2013, the Dzerzhinsky District Court in St. Petersburg ruled in favor of the artists, ordering that all but 4 of the 25 paintings be returned (those four were Savchenkov's paintings established to belong to artist Vladislav Gusevich.)
