= Avtomaticheskiye Udovletvoriteli =

Russian punk band

Avtomaticheskiye Udovletvoriteli Автоматические удовлетворители
- Origin: Leningrad, Soviet Union
- Genre: Punk rock
- Years active: 1979–1998
- Label: Begemotion Records
- Past members: Andrey "Svin" Panov; Viktor Tsoi; Alexey Rybin; Yevgeny Fyodorov; Dmitriy Pshishliak and others

Avtomaticheskiye Udovletvoriteli (Russian: Автоматические удовлетворители, lit. 'The Automatic Satisfiers', abbreviated AU) was a Soviet, and later Russian, punk band, formed in Leningrad in 1979. It is considered the first Russian punk band, and its founder, Andrei Panov, is sometimes referred to as "the first punk in the USSR".

== History ==
Andrei Panov, also known as "Svin" (Russian: Свин, lit. 'Swine'), formed Avtomaticheskiye Udovletvoriteli (AU) in autumn 1979. The group's name was a loose Russian translation of Sex Pistols, who were a major influence on the group's style and attitude. AU were also influenced by the Soviet bard Vladimir Vysotsky.

In December 1980, Artemy Troitsky invited AU to give a series of apartment concerts in Moscow. Viktor Tsoi played bass in the group at this time. On March 23, 1981, AU performed at Andrei Tropillo's birthday celebration in a St. Petersburg cafe with a similar line-up. Most of the group's earliest performances took place in private apartments, and their early recordings were apartment concert tapes.

When the Leningrad Rock Club formed, AU was initially denied admission. According to Troitsky, "the opinion of the rock club's council was that they simply couldn't play, and in fact many weak bands (not just 'punks') were denied a place in the rock club on the same ground." As a result, AU only performed sporadically and produced few recordings compared to bands that had the support of the Leningrad Rock Club at the time.

As restrictions on rock music loosened with glasnost, AU's status changed. In 1987, AU was allowed into the Leningrad Rock Club and performed at the fifth Leningrad rock festival. They continued to perform at festivals and clubs throughout the '80s and '90s with various line-ups. Former members of AU went on to play in other bands, such as Kino and Tequilajazzz.

Panov died of peritonitis at the age of 38 on August 20, 1998.

Although AU were active for nineteen years (1979–1998), they never released an official album or single during that time. However, they made studio recordings with Andrei Tropillo and Aleksei Vishnya as well as concert recordings that were distributed as magnitizdat. Some of AU's recordings have since been restored and released by Otdelenie Vyhod (Russian: Отделение «Выход»), a Russian record label specializing in Soviet and Russian rock.

== Discography ==
- 1984 — Nadristat' (Russian: «Надристать!», lit. 'Shit!'), AU's section of the split album Terry, Cherry, Svin (Russian: Терри, Черри, Свин), recorded by Aleksei Vishnya
- 1987 — Reagan Provocateur (Russian: «Рейган-провокатор»), recorded by Andrei Tropillo
- 1995 — Tel. 1979–1994. Pretenzii ne prinimayutsya (Russian: «Тел. 1979-1994. Претензии не принимаются», lit. '1979-1994: No pretensions accepted'), released by Caravan Records
- 1995 — Peyte s nami (Russian: «Пейте с нами!», lit. 'Drink with us!'), split album with Olesya Troyanskaya, released by Otdelenie Vyhod

As AU Tipa 600 (Russian: АУ Типа 600):

- 1988 — Pesenniki i pyosenniki (Russian: «Песенники и пёсенники», lit. 'Song-books and dog-books') Andrei Panov was known to be pissed because the first batch had been titled by publishers "Песенники И Песенники" making the pun he intended meaningless.

As FAU (Russian: ФАУ):

- 1998 — Prazdnik neposlushaniya ili posledniy den' Pompeya (Russian: «Праздник непослушания или последний день Помпея», lit. 'Festival of disobedience or the last days of Pompeii'), released by Otdelenie Vyhod
