= Anatoly Gunitsky =

Russian writer, journalist and poet (1953–2025)

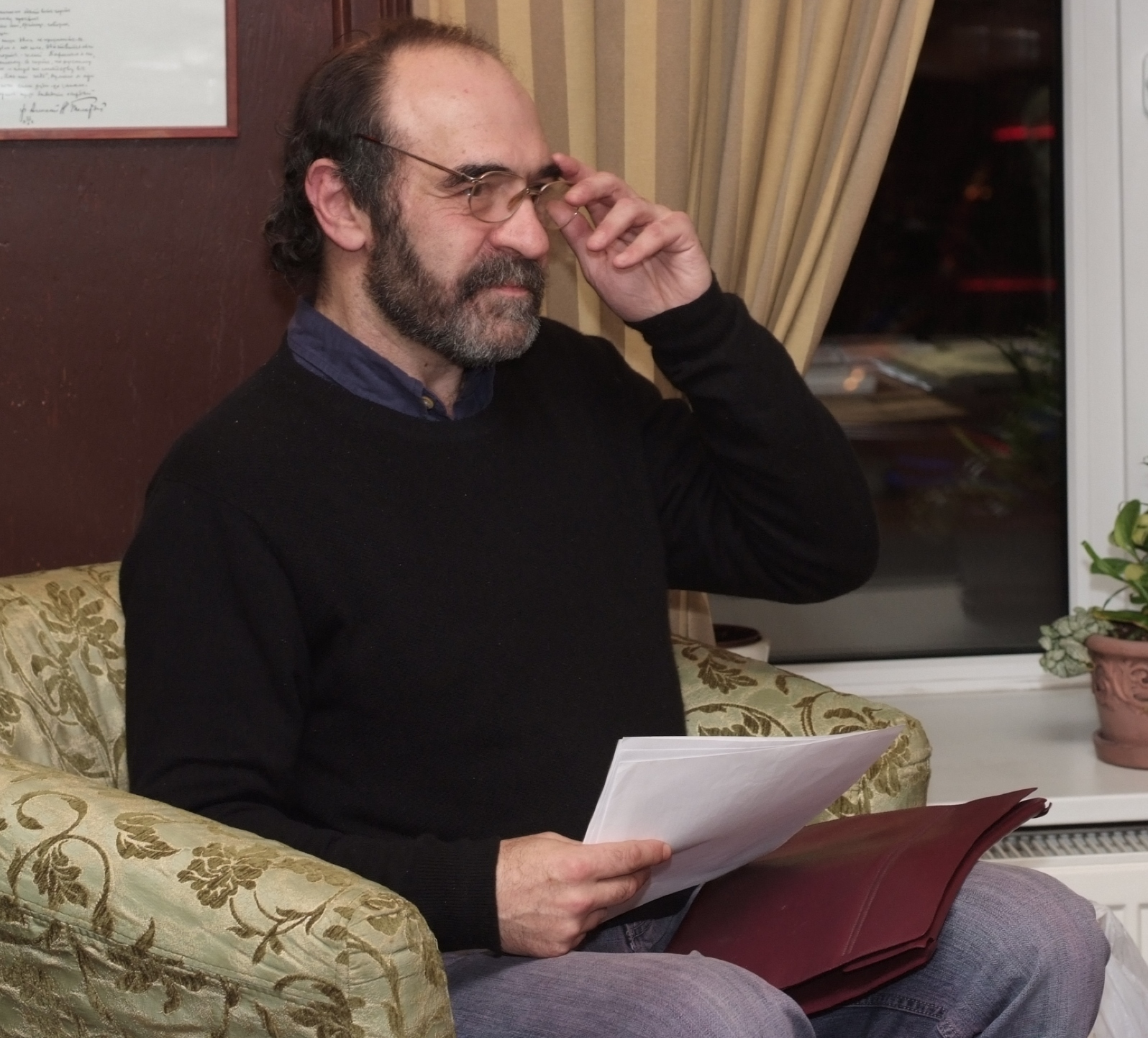
- Gunitsky in 2009
- Born: Anatoly Avgustovich Gunitsky; 30 September 1953; Leningrad, Russian SFSR, USSR
- Died: 5 June 2025 (aged 71); Saint Petersburg, Russia
- Occupations: Writer, poet, musician

Anatoly Avgustovich Gunitsky (Russian: Анато́лий А́вгустович Гуни́цкий, IPA: [ɐnɐˈtolʲɪj ˈavɡʊstəvʲɪdʑ ɡʊˈnʲitskʲɪj]; 30 September 1953 – 5 June 2025), also known as George and Old Rocker (Старый рокер), was a Russian writer, journalist and poet. He was one of the founders of the band Aquarium.

From the foundation of Aquarium in 1972 he was the drummer of the group and the author of many lyrics. In 1975 he left the group and participated in absurd theatre actions. In that period he wrote To the Very Heights, Death of a Stowaway and other plays.

Gunitsky died on 5 June 2025, at the age of 71.

== Books ==
- To the Very Heights (1989)
- Death to the Stowaway! (1991)
- Practice of Private Phenomena (1992)
- Metamorphoses of a Positive Hero (1996)
- Hook-shapedness Is My Motto. Aquarium Poems (2000)
- Works in 2 Volumes: v. 1 Songs, v. 2 Non-songs (2002)
- Notes of an Old Rocker (2005)
- Book of Songs (2006)
- Stories about Sashka (2006)
- The Shore of Words (2009)
- ¾ of Half the Moon (2012)
- Airplanes, But Presidents (2015)
- Twelve Years Later (2015)
- My Aquarium (2015)
- Caution! Aquarium Is Playing! (2018)
- My Ant (2018)
- Time Is Running Out (2022)
