= Khochu peremen =

Russian rock song

Single by Kino

from the album Posledniy geroy
- Language: Russian
- Released: First performed Summer 1986; 1989 (studio version)
- Genre: Post-punk
- Songwriter: Viktor Tsoi

"Khochu peremen!" (Russian: «Хочу перемен!», lit. 'I want changes!') (Note: Also known as "My zhdyom peremen" (Russian: «Мы ждём перемен», lit. '"We are waiting for changes"'), or simply "Peremen!" (Russian: «Перемен!», lit. '"Changes!"')) is a song by the Soviet rock band Kino, written by the band's lead singer, Viktor Tsoi. It was made famous by its use in the 1987 film Assa in which Viktor Tsoi prominently sung the song at the end of the film. The 1989 album Posledniy geroy includes a studio-recorded release of the song.

The song has since become a favorite for political movements in post-Soviet states and as a protest song.

== History ==
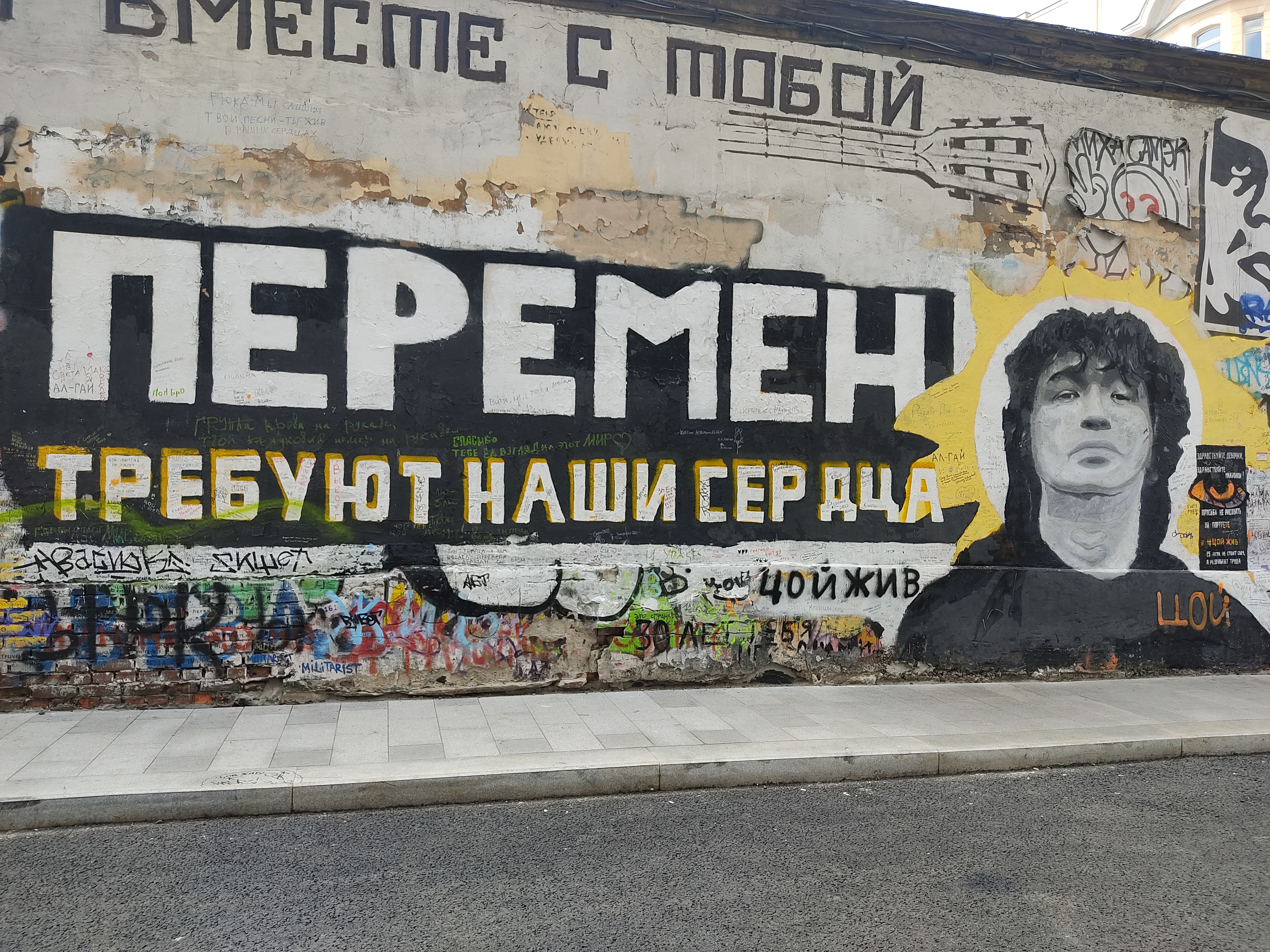
The Tsoi memorial wall emblazoned with the refrain in 2022

Kino and their lead singer Viktor Tsoi had previously been part of the underground rock movement in the Soviet Union. In 1987, Tsoi starred in the official Soviet government film Assa. The film, which became a cult classic, promoted Soviet leader Mikhail Gorbachev's Glasnost and Perestroika political, social and economic reforms. In the film, Tsoi plays a rock musician who, when confronted by a zealous official reading out a list of rules he must abide by to make a live performance in a restaurant, ignores them and steps on stage to play "khochu peremen".

The film became a symbol of the rapid changes made in Gorbachev's USSR and brought Kino a mass audience for the first time. Kino performed the song in June 1990 in front of 62,000 people at the Luzhniki Stadium in Moscow during one of the band's first major gigs. Though it has since become an iconic song for political opposition and reform campaigns, Tsoi, who died in August 1990, said that the change which he described was personal change.

The song has been described by The New European as having an "urgent drum-beat and sub-rockabilly riffs". Its lyrics (in Russian) include the chorus: “‘Change!’ require our hearts, ‘Change!’ require our eyes. In our laughter and in our tears, And in the pulsations of the veins: ‘Change! We are waiting for change!’”.

== Impact ==
The song has been used during many Eastern European political campaigns and movements. Its success is partly because the lyrics can be applied to numerous causes. The song was played from speakers at a barricade by civilians opposing the 1991 Soviet coup d'état attempt by hard-line communists; it was also played at protests during the 1993 Russian constitutional crisis. It was sung in Moscow in 2011 by opponents of Putin, but also, separately, by his supporters. "Khochu peremen" was sung at the 2011 Belarusian protests against President Alexander Lukashenko and at the 2013-14 Euromaidan protests in Ukraine.

The song was used frequently during the 2020-2021 Belarusian protests against Lukashenko, particularly at rallies for opposition leader Sviatlana Tsikhanouskaya. On 6 August 2020, two sound engineers slipped the track into the line-up for a pro-government concert. Government officials pulled the power to the speakers mid-song and the engineers were arrested and imprisoned.

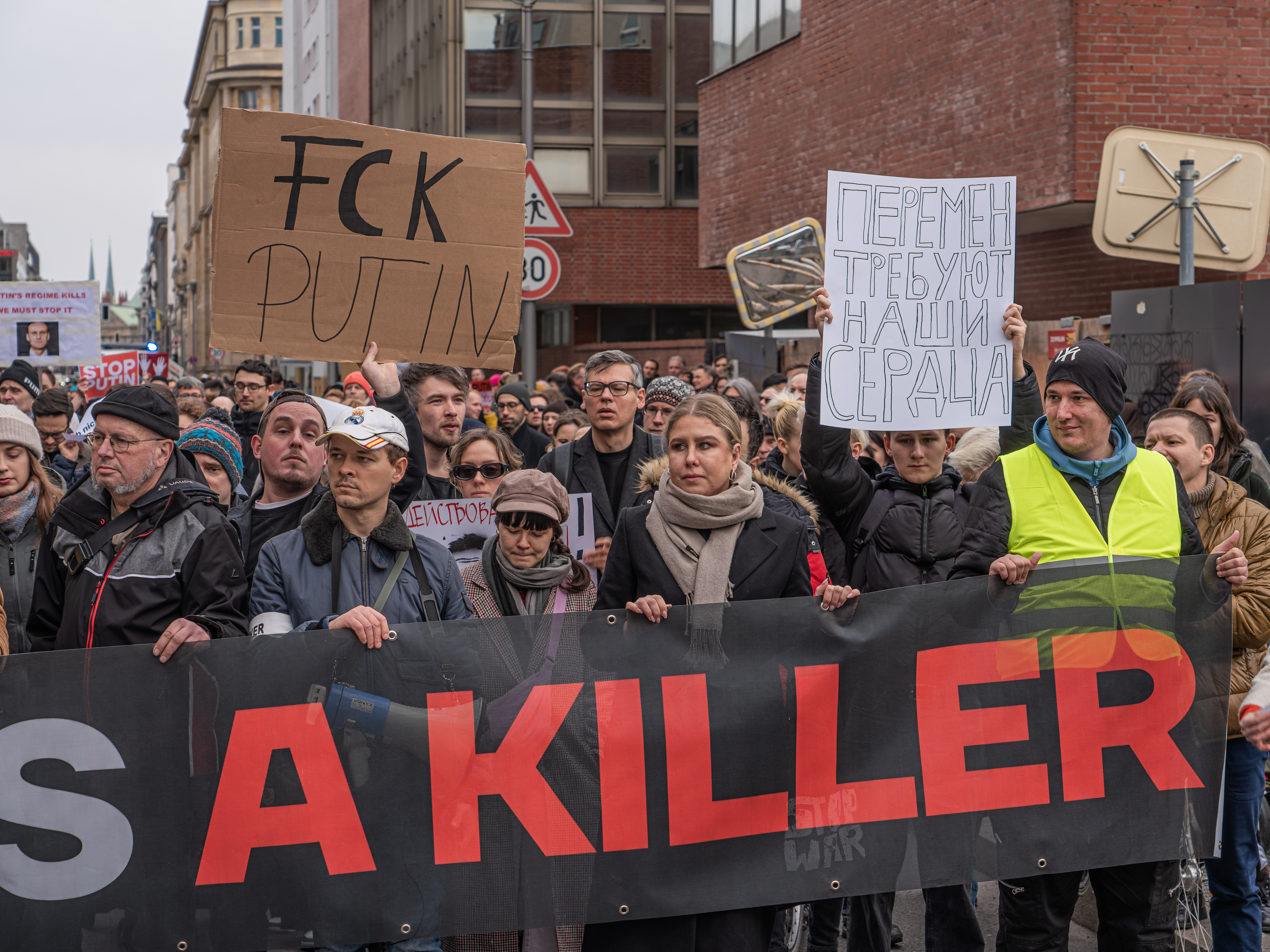
Song quote "Перемен требуют наши сердца" ("Our hearts demand changes") at a demonstration in Berlin after the death of Alexei Navalny in 2024

Such is the influence of the song that Gorbachev later recalled being inspired by it when he assembled his new pro-reform politburo after coming to power following the death of Konstantin Chernenko. Gorbachev stated "The first thing I did was appoint a Politburo and convene a meeting, at which I turned to the foreign minister Gromyko and said things needed to be done differently. Tsoi is singing 'We want changes' in concerts, I said, and people are saying openly and directly, 'We want changes'." Gorbachev must have been mistaken in this as Chernenko died on 10 March 1985, and "khochu peremen" was not performed publicly until the summer of 1986.
