= Navigator (Aquarium album) =

Studio album by Aquarium
- Released: September 1995
- Recorded: May–June 1995
- Studio: Livingston Recording Studios, London
- Label: Тriarius Records
- Producer: Boris Grebenshchikov and Kate St John

Aquarium chronology
Sands of Petersburg (1994)	Navigator (1995)	Snow Lion (1996)

Navigator (Russian: Навигатор) is an album by the Russian rock band Aquarium. Released in 30,000 copies in Russia in September 1995, it sold out within a week, becoming the most commercially successful album of the year in Russia and establishing Aquarium as a popular band both in Russia and the UK.

== History ==
Grebenshchikov wrote texts for Navigator in random places around the world, including Paris, Kathmandu, and a remote village in Russia. Although the band already had draft music for the songs, it had no money for renting a professional recording studio. In the spring of 1995, while touring London, the band attracted the attention of several musicians and music producers, such as Joe Boyd, Kate St John, Jerry Boys, Mick Taylor, Dave Mattacks and Anthony Thistlethwaite. Boyd arranged for the group to record Navigator at the Livingston Recording Studios in May–June, 1995, while Taylor, Mattacks and Thistlethwaite joined Aquarium to record some tracks. Mattacks replaced the drummer Alex Ratsen who left Aquarium in 1995. St John arranged the album and invited a brass band that accompanied the last song ("Wonderful Master Lukjyanov").

== Track listing ==
All songs written by Boris Grebenshchikov.

1. "The Little Blue Light" (Голубой огонёк) 2:28
2. "The Last Turn" (Последний поворот) 2:41
3. "The Cemetery" (Кладбище) 4:22
4. "Don't Mow" (Не коси) 3:24
5. "Suffering" (Мается) 5:48
6. "The Fastest Plane" (Самый быстрый самолёт) 2:51
7. "Navigator" (Навигатор) 3:22
8. "The Guardian of the Barge" (Стерегущий баржу) 2:37
9. "The Customs Blues" (Таможенный блюз) 3:41
10. "The Three Sisters" (Три сестры) 4:36
11. "Garçon No.2" (Гарсон No.2) 4:13
12. "Ficus Religiosa" (Фикус религиозный) 3:08
13. "Wonderful Master Lukjyanov" (Удивительный мастер Лукьянов) 5:02

Bonus tracks

1. "Kate-Katherine" (Катя-Катерина)
2. "The Little Blue Light (demo version)" (Голубой огонёк)

== Musicians ==
- Boris Grebenshchikov – voice, guitar
- Oleg Sakmarov – flute, recorder
- Alexander Titov – bass guitar
- Aleksei Zubarev – electric guitar, harpsichord
- Sergei Schurakov – accordion, mandolin
- Andrey Vykharev – percussion
- Andrei Surodinov – violin, viola, harpsichord, piano
- Mick Taylor – guitars (#4,9)
- Dave Mattacks – drums
- Anthony Thistlethwaite – harmonica (#9)
- Jerry Boys – mixing
- B J Cole - pedal steel guitar.
- Danny Thompson - upright bass.
- gator. AllMusic review (4.5/5 stars)
