= VladiROCKstok =

VladiROCKstok '96 was the first major international music festival in Vladivostok, Russia, taking place on September 21, 1996. The festival was founded by two U.S. Executive Producers (David Poritzky and Dan Gotham), Vladivostok's New Wave Radio and 21st Century Productions, along with a team of more than 100 staff and volunteers from Vladivostok, Seattle, and places in between. Other partners in the event included members of the production team of Bumbershoot Festival in Seattle (USA), and nearly a dozen corporate sponsors. Nine bands performed at the festival.
