= Georgy Guryanov =

Soviet and Russian musician

Georgy Guryanov Георгий Константинович Гурьянов
- Guryanov c. 1984–1985

Background information
- Also known as: Gustav
- Born: February 27, 1961; Leningrad, Russian SFSR, Soviet Union
- Died: July 20, 2013 (aged 52) Saint Petersburg, Russia
- Genres: Russian rock; post-punk; New Wave
- Instruments: drum kit; drum machine; bass guitar; guitar; piano

Georgy (Gustav) Konstantinovich Guryanov (Russian: Георгий (Гу́став) Константи́нович Гурья́нов; 27 February 1961 – 20 July 2013) was a Soviet and Russian musician and artist.

From 1984 to 1990, Guryanov was the drummer, arranger, and backing vocalist in Kino and participant in Sergey Kuryokhin's Pop Mechanics. From 1990 to 2013, Guryanov worked as an artist. From 1993, he was an honorary professor at the New Academy of Fine Arts (Russian: Музей Новой академии изящных искусств) in Saint Petersburg. In the 1990s and 2000s, Guryanov was considered a celebrity in Saint Petersburg and a famous Russian dandy.

== Biography ==
Georgy Guryanov was born on 27 February 1961 in the maternity hospital of the Petrogradsky District, Leningrad to Konstantin Fedorovich (6 July 1914 - 26 October 1993) and Margarita Vikentievna (22 December 1924 - 9 February 2013), both geologists. Even before school, he began to study music at the Kozitsky Palace of Culture, where he learned to play the balalaika, domra, piano, and guitar.

From 1974 to 1976, Guryanov studied at secondary school No. 363 in Kupchino. In 1975, he graduated from the city art school No. 1. In 1976, he entered the V. A. Serov Leningrad Art School (Russian: Ленинградское художественное училище имени В. А. Серова), but left the school after a year.

Guryanov lived in Moscow for part of the late 1970s and early 1980s. Starting in the late 1980s, Guryanov traveled substantially. He visited Copenhagen, Amsterdam, Paris, Rome, Budapest, New York, Los Angeles, Cadaques, and lived for long periods in Berlin, London, and Spain (having studied Spanish since 1993). He called St. Petersburg, Madrid, and London his favorite cities. In his final years, he lived and worked on Liteyny Avenue in St. Petersburg.

== Music ==
From 1978 to 1979, Guryanov played bass guitar in Sergey "Sam" Semyonov's band. In 1983, he briefly played in Andrey "Swine" Panov's punk group, Avtomaticheskie udovletvoriteli. In 1985, he helped record the drum parts for the band Narodonoe opolcheniye's (Russian: «Народное ополчение», lit. 'People's Militia') album Novogodiye (Russian: Новогодие, lit. 'New Years'). In the mid-1980s, he was the drummer for the band Igry (Russian: «Игры», lit. 'Games').

In 1982, Guryanov met Viktor Tsoi. From 1984, he started playing in Kino as a drummer, arranger, and backing vocalist.

Guryanov was distinguished by his manner of playing on the drum kit while standing. In the 1980s, he was nicknamed "Gustav".

In the 1980s, Guryanov also began to collaborate with the duo New Composers (Russian: Новые композиторы), pioneers in the field of electronic music in the USSR. In the second half of the 1980s, musicians from Kino and New Composers collaborated on the album Start.

In 1984, together with Timur Novikov and Igor Verichev, Guryanov performed in the "Ballet of Three Lovebirds" by Daniil Kharms to the music of New Composers. From 1985, he was part of the industrial group of Sergey Kuryokhin's Pop-Mechanics, in which he also participated as a drummer and vocalist.

Guryanov played in Kino until the band's break-up following Tsoi's death in August 1990. At the time of Tsoi's death, according to Guryanov, the group was preparing to go to Tokyo to meet with an influential Japanese production corporation.

In the late 1980s, he turned his attention to the culture of techno, house music, and the club movement. In the early 1990s, Guryanov helped organize the first Russian raves: "Gagarin Party" at the VDNKh and "Mobile Party" at the Krylatskoye stadium in Moscow. He designed the poster for "Mobile Party".

== Painting ==
In 1979, Guryanov met artist Timur Novikov. In 1982, he became one of the first members of the New Artists group. Guryanov took part in the action "Zero Object" (Russian: «Ноль объект») with Novikov.

In 1985, Guryanov and Tsoi, together with the New Artists, became the artists of the Leningrad Rock Club.

In 1986, Guryanov, Novikov, and Sergey "Afrika" Bugaev founded the Club of Friends of V V Mayakovsky (Russian: «Клуб друзей Маяковского»).

In 1989, Novikov founded the New Academy of Fine Arts, and Guryanov became one of its members. Guryanov, along with fellow Neo-Academicians, received the title of Professor of the Academy.

In July 1990, Guryanov took part in the First Exhibition on Palace Bridge, organized by the artist Ivan Movsesyan. Guryanov made a painting specifically for the exhibition of two phalluses in blue and red on white canvas, which, according to Hannelore Fobo, "broke a double taboo: as a symbol of same-sex love and of Russia as an independent state, which happened only a year later."

In 1990, he took part in the project "Youth and Beauty in Art" (conference and exhibition), held by Timur Novikov and Dunya Smirnova at the Leningrad House of Scientists.

In 1991, he participated in the exhibition "Academism and Neo-Academism" in the Marble Palace (Museum of V. I. Lenin), alongside artists such as Novikov, Denis Egelsky, and the young couturier Konstantin Goncharov, who created the "Strict Youth" (Russian: «Строгий юноша») fashion house. Goncharov had made outfits for Guryanov and the other members of Kino. On June 21–22, 1991, Guryanov participated in the Second Exhibition on Palace Bridge, exhibiting a monumental painted panel "The Fighters" (Russian: «Борцы»).

In 1992, he won the television competition "New Name of Russia and the Commonwealth Countries" (Russian: «Новое имя России и стран Содружества»). In July 1992, he took part in the Third Exhibition on Palace Bridge, called "Extravaganza and Allegory of Leonardo", and in the exhibition "Secret Cult" in the Marble Palace, which also featured works by Wilhelm von Gloeden and French artists Pierre and Gilles.

In 1993, Guryanov's first personal exhibition opened at the State Russian Museum in St. Petersburg.

In 1994, he participated in the exhibition "Renaissance and Resistance" at the State Russian Museum. An exhibition of Guryanov's work titled "Willpower" (Russian: «Сила воли») ran at the Regina Gallery, Moscow from 1 November to 30 November 1994.

In September 1995, Guryanov took part in the exhibition "On Beauty" at the Regina Gallery, Moscow, curated by Dan Cameron.

In 1997, Guryanov took part in the exhibition "Kabinet" at the Stedelijk Museum, Amsterdam.

In 1998, Guryanov's painting "Rowers" (Russian: «Гребцы») was selected as a poster for the Amsterdam Gay Games.

In 1999, he became part of the New Serious movement, organized by Timur Novikov.

In 2001, 2003, and 2004, solo exhibitions of Guryanov's works were held in the St. Petersburg gallery D-137. The gallery also repeatedly presented the artist's works as part of the Art Moscow project. In 2004, an exhibition of Guryanov's work took place in the Parisian gallery Orel Art.

From November 2011 to January 2012, Guryanov's works were shown in the exhibition "New Academy. St. Petersburg" at the Ekaterina Cultural Foundation in Moscow. The exhibit was curated by Arkady Ippolitov and Alexandra Khartonova.

Guryanov was most known for his images of athletes, sailors, and pilots. According to Maria Engström, these works follow in tradition of Andy Warhol's pop art as well as the Socialist realist works of Aleksandr Samokhvalov, Aleksandr Deyneka, and Ivan Shagin. Other references in Guryanov's work include the photographs of Alexander Rodchenko and films such as A Severe Young Man, Querelle, and Death in Venice. Many of these works also featured an element of self-portraiture. According to the art critic Ekaterina Andreeva, "In Neo-Academism [...], Guryanov’s rôle was particularly important, because he was the first to approach the taboo of totalitarian iconography [...] and he did so without the mask of irony that characterized Sots Art and Conceptualism."

In an analytical review of the Russian contemporary art market in 2016, Guryanov was recognized as the most expensive artist in Russia for the last 10 years among those who reached their career peak after 1991 and exhibited at auctions in the last decade. Guryanov's 1990 work Self-Portrait was sold at the Sotheby's Contemporary East auction in June 2016 for 143,000 GBP.

== Film and television ==
Guryanov appeared as himself in Kino's music videos and in the cult films such as Ya-Hha (Russian: «Йя-Хха»), End Of Holiday (Russian: «Конец каникул»), Rok (Russian: «Рок»), and Assa. According to the director Rashid Nugmanov, Guryanov was considered for a role in The Needle, but Guryanov turned it down.

In 1989, Guryanov helped found Pirate Television (Russian: Пиратское телевидение) alongside Yuris Lesnik, Vladislav Mamyshev-Monroe, and Timur Novikov. Guryanov led the Pirate TV sports program, "Spartacus".

Guryanov portrayed Mayakovsky in the 1998 film The Love Story of Marilyn Monroe and Vladimir Mayakovsky by the New Academy artist Olga Tobreluts.

In 2010, Guryanov appeared in the film The Needle Remix (Russian: Игла Remix) as a DJ.

== Illness and death ==
In his final years, Guryanov became seriously ill. He was diagnosed with hepatitis C, as well as complications with cancer in his liver and pancreas. On June 21, 2013, Guryanov was discharged from Botkin Hospital. In his last month, he underwent chemotherapy in Germany and remained home in critical condition. He died at the age of 52 on July 20, 2013, in St. Petersburg.

The funeral service took place on July 25 at the St. Nicholas Naval Cathedral in St. Petersburg. Guryanov was buried at the Smolensk Cemetery.

== Memorial ==
On February 27, 2014, Guryanov's birthday, the first exhibition dedicated to the artist and musician was opened in the Pushinskaya 10 Arts Center at the Museum of the New Academy of Fine Arts, with the support of the gallery D137. The exhibition, titled "My artwork - Me myself" (Russian: «Мое произведение искусства – я сам»), featured works by friends and contemporaries such as Timur Novikov, Viktor Tsoi, Evgeny Kozlov, Vladislav Mamyshev-Monroe, Denis Egelsky, Edyge Niyazov, Metsur Volde, and Andrey Khlobystin. It was curated by Andrey Khlobystin. A catalog dedicated to Guryanov was prepared for the opening of the exhibition.

In August 2017, the AST publishing house (Moscow) published the book “Georgy Guryanov: I Am Art,” written by Metsur Volde.

== Works in collections ==
- Russian Museum, Saint Petersburg
- New Museum (Russian: Новый музей), Saint Petersburg
- Triumph Gallery (Russian: Собрание галереи «Триумф»), Moscow
- Private collection of Rinad Akhmetchin
- Private collection of Shalva Breus
- Private collection of Pierre-Christian Brochet
- Private collection of Victoria Markina
- Private collection of Regina and Vladimir Ovcharenko, Moscow
- Private collection of Ekaterina and Vladimir Seminikhin, Moscow
