= Kaliningrad Museum of Fine Arts =

Art gallery in Kaliningrad, Russia

Coordinates: 54.70839°N 20.51917°E

Kaliningrad Museum of Fine Arts is an art gallery in Kaliningrad, Russia, located in Moskovsky Prospect.

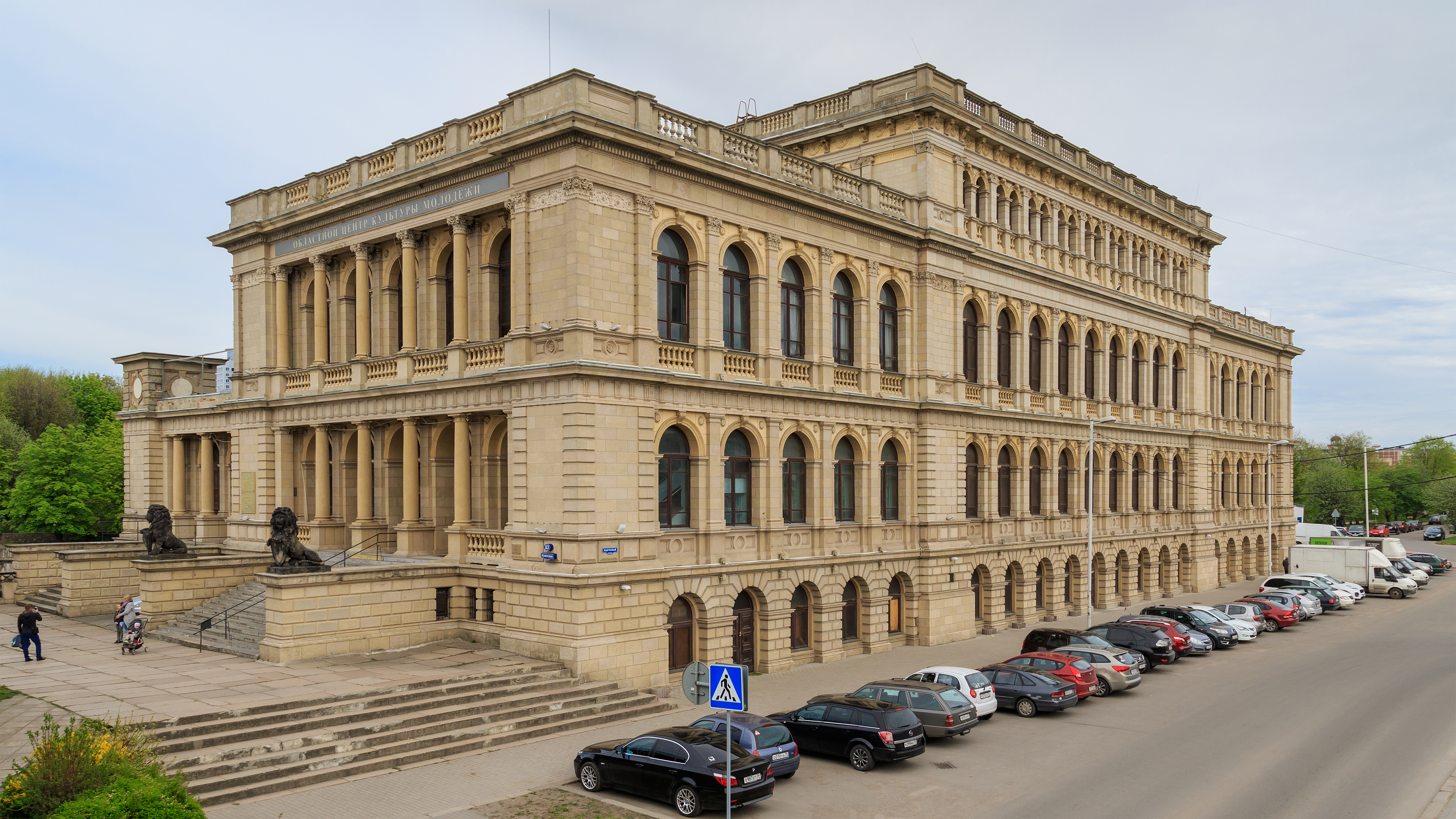
Museum building, originally Konigsberg Stock Exchange

The gallery was founded in 1988 and specialises in modern art, especially paintings of the 20th century from Russia and elsewhere. It is also developing as a contemporary art gallery.

The gallery is involved with the Russia International Biennial of Graphic Art "Kaliningrad-Konigsberg".
