= Edige Niyazov =

Kazakhstani photographer (1940–2009)

- Born: 22 March 1940; Almaty, Kazakhstan
- Died: 29 November 2009 (aged 69); Pavlodar, Kazakhstan
- Citizenship: Soviet Union→ Kazakhstan

Edige Rishatuly Niyazov (Kazakh: Едіге Ришатұлы Ниязов, Edıge Rişatūly Niiazov; Russian: Едыге Решатович Ниязов; 22 March 1940, Alma-Ata (Almaty) — 29 November 2009, Pavlodar) was a Soviet and Kazakhstani photographer.

== Biography ==
Edige Niyazov was born on 22 March 1940 in Alma-Ata. He graduated from the History Department of the Kazakh State University and worked as a history teacher from 1964 to 1977. He was a member of the Photographers Union of Russia, Honorary member of the Mediterranean Photography Center «Dark Fountain» in France and member of the Kazakh's «Pryirtysh» Association.

== Exhibitions ==
Personal photoexhibitions:

- Almaty (2000, 2004, Kazakhstan);
- Hamburg (1999, Germany);
- Melitopol (1988, Ukraine);
- Moscow (1987, 2002, Russia);
- Omsk (2009, Ru: Museum of The Art named by M. A. Vrubel, Russia);
- Pavlodar (1998, 2004; 2010 (17.03.2010 — 17.04.2010), Ru: Exhibition0 ~180 photos, Pavlodar Oblast' Art Museum, Kazakhstan);
- Saint-Peterburg (2.07.2009 — 27.07.2009, Ru: «Direct Photography», 1983–1993 years, gallery «D-137» in the Government Russian Museum, Russia).
- Stockholm (1988, Sweden);
- Ukhta (1990, Russia);
- Aix-en-Provence (1990, 1992, France);

Also have a participation of Art of Photography Exhibition in France, USA, Finland, Sweden, Japan, Russia, Spain and so on.

== Bibliography ==
- Pojarskaya (Ru: Пожарская), Svetlana (Ru: Светлана) (2001). Photo master. Book of photography and Photographers. (Ru: Фотомастер. Книга о фотографах и фотографии). Penta (Ru: Пента). p. 336. ISBN 978-5-88950-026-1.

== See also ==
  - Ru: статья на Photographer.Ru — это профессиональный экспертный интернет-ресурс.
  - Ru: Небольшая галерея фотографий
  - Ru: анонсы выставок на сайте Союза фотохудожников России (также )
  - Ru: «Петербургский эпос Едыге Ниязова», авт. Андрей Хлобыстин
  - Ru: «Художник светописи», газета Известия от 08 декабря 2006, авт. Зауре Ахметова
  - Ru: «...трагическая смерть», газета Комсомольская правда от 01.12.2009, авт. Т. Ермашев
