= Assa (film) =

1987 film directed by Sergei Solovyov

- Directed by: Sergei Solovyov
- Written by: Sergei Solovyov; Sergei Livnev
- Starring: Tatyana Drubich; Stanislav Govorukhin; Viktor Tsoi; Sergei "Afrika" Bugaev
- Narrated by: Natan Eidelman
- Cinematography: Pavel Lebeshev
- Music by: Boris Grebenshchikov
- Production company: Mosfilm
- Release date: 1987
- Running time: 145 minutes
- Country: Soviet Union
- Language: Russian

Assa (Russian: Асса) is a 1987 Soviet crime film directed and co-written by Sergei Solovyov. It became a cult film, mainly because it was one of the films that brought Russian rock music from the underground into the mainstream. Solovyov made a sequel to the film twenty years later, 2-ASSA-2.

While there are no causal links to it, Sovietology uses the release of Assa as a benchmark for when Perestroika reached the mass culture, and accordingly, entered its prime phase. This could be explained by the fact that the film was the first sanctioned production to feature the rock band Kino.

== Plot ==
There are two plot lines in the film. The main plot takes place in the winter of 1980 and tells the story of Alika (Tatyana Drubich), a young nurse who stays in Yalta with her patient and lover Krymov (Stanislav Govorukhin), who is considerably older than she is. Krymov is the head of a criminal group and is being watched by KGB agents, but Alika is not completely aware of this. At the Yalta Intourist, Alika meets Bananan (Sergei "Afrika" Bugaev), a young and eccentric underground rock musician, who introduces her to the Soviet counterculture. When Krymov discovers that Alika is developing a relationship with Bananan, he becomes jealous and tries to convince Bananan to leave Alika and Yalta altogether; after Bananan refuses, Krymov's minions murder him. When Krymov tells Alika about this, she murders him and is arrested by the Militsiya, although they treat her gently.

Another minor plot line shows the history of the murder of tsar Paul I of Russia. It is based on a book by Natan Eidelman, which Krymov is shown reading throughout the movie.

== Experimental scenes and relation to the Russian rock scene ==
Besides the two conventional plot lines, the film is notable for having many experimental scenes which are only loosely related to the plot: Bananan's surreal dreams, "footnotes" with explanations of Russian rock slang, and performances of complete Russian rock songs by Aquarium, Bravo, Soyuz kompozitorov, Yury Chernavsky with Vesyolye Rebyata, and Kino. Boris Grebenshchikov of Aquarium wrote the film's instrumental soundtrack and he is also referenced in the film's dialog: Bananan tells Krymov that Grebenshchikov "is a God who radiates light".

The film's memorable final scene symbolizes the liberation of Russian music from the state-imposed restrictions. In the scene, which is barely related to the plot, Bananan's bandmate brings Viktor Tsoi, the singer of Kino, portrayed by himself, to work in a restaurant as a singer; the restaurant manager starts reading to him the strict rules that all restaurant performers must follow, but instead of listening to her, Tsoi goes straight to the stage and starts singing I Want Changes (Хочу перемен); after some time the camera turns around and shows that he's not in a restaurant, but in front of a huge admiring crowd of young people in a theatre. This song became strongly associated with the social changes in the Soviet Union in the times of Perestroika and Glasnost in late 1980s.

Another experimental scene shows one of Krymov's minions (Aleksandr Bashirov) being interrogated about Krymov's criminal activities. In an attempt to avoid squealing he pretends to be insane and delivers a monologue about being traumatized by the death of Yuri Gagarin. The monologue was improvised by Bashirov.

== Cast ==
- Sergei "Afrika" Bugaev as Bananan
- Tatyana Drubich as Alika
- Stanislav Govorukhin as Andrey Valentinovich Krymov ("Svan")
- Dmitriy Shumilov as Vitya, Bananan's friend
- Aleksandr Bashirov as Shurik Babakin ("Major"), thief
- Anatoly Slivnikov as "Thug", thief
- Viktor Beshlyaga as Albert Petrovich, little actor
- Anita Zhukovskaya as Zoya, Albert's wife
- German Shorr as "Blain", thief
- Ilya Ivanov as "Ball", thief
- Svetlana Tormakhova as Marya Antonovna, Bananan's mother
- Aleksandr Domogarov as Aleksandr I

The film features cameo appearances by Viktor Tsoi, Yuri Kasparyan, Sergey Ryizhenko, Timur Novikov, Andrey Krisanov and Georgy Guryanov.

== Soundtrack ==
1. Hello, Bananan Boy (Здравствуй, мальчик Бананан) — Yury Chernavsky and Vesyolye Rebyata
2. I Go To You (Иду на ты) — Boris Grebenshchikov and Aquarium
3. Air Force (ВВС) — Aleksandr Sinitsin and Soyuz Kompozitorov band
4. Chick Blues (Мочалкин блюз) — Boris Grebenshchikov and Aquarium
5. The Plane (Плоскость) — Boris Grebenshchikov and Aquarium
6. Old Kozlodoyev (Старик Козлодоев) — Boris Grebenshchikov and Aquarium
7. City Of Gold (Город золотой) — Boris Grebenshchikov and Aquarium
8. Wonderful Land (Чудесная страна) — Jeanne Aguzarova and Bravo
9. I Want Changes (Хочу перемен) — Viktor Tsoi and Kino
