= Aquarium (band) =

Russian musical group

Aquarium Аквариум
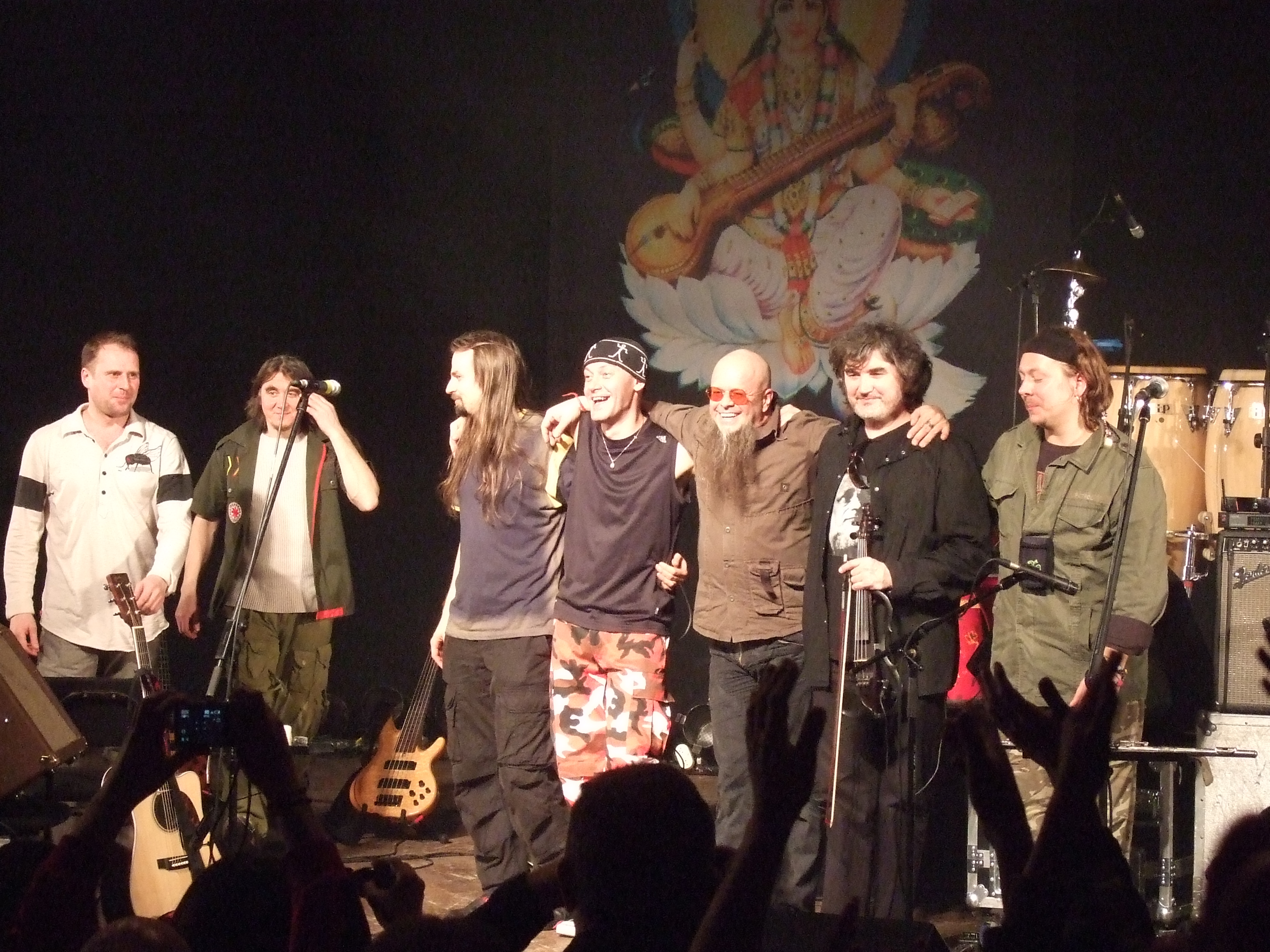
- Aquarium in Tel Aviv, 2008

Background information
- Origin: Soviet Union
- Genres: Folk rock, art rock, psychedelic folk, new wave, reggae, experimental rock, psychedelic rock, indie rock
- Years active: 1972–1991, 1992–present
- Labels: AnTrop, Melodiya, Solyd, Soyuz
- Website: bg-aquarium.com

Aquarium or Akvarium (Russian: Аквариум; often stylized as Åквариум) is a Russian rock group formed in Leningrad in 1972. The band is considered one of the founders of Russian rock. Aquarium has had many line-up changes over its history, and lead singer and founder Boris Grebenshchikov is the only remaining original member. Former band members include Anatoly Gunitsky, Mikhail Feinstein, Andrei "Dyusha" Romanov, Vsevolod Gakkel, and Sergey Kuryokhin.

== Formation, first lineup (1972–1991) ==
Aquarium was formed in 1972 by two friends: Boris Grebenshchikov, then a student of applied mathematics at Leningrad State University, and Anatoly (George) Gunitsky, a playwright and absurdist poet. The founding members were Grebenshchikov, George (drums), Alexander Tsatsanidi (bass), Vadim Vasilyev (keyboards), Valery Obogrelov (sound).

The popular story behind the name "Aquarium" is that it was inspired by the Budapest street Leningrad pub "The Aquarium" and suggested by one of the band members. However, Grebenshchikov has given differing stories in interviews, suggesting alternately that it came through band word association sessions or was inspired by a glass aquarium-like building.

In late 1973, guitarist Edmund Shkliarsky (later the leader of Piknik) was briefly a member of the band. Bass player Michael Feinstein-Vasiliev (Fan), the first professional musician in Aquarium, joined in 1973. The next year keyboardist Andrew "Dyusha" Romanov joined the band, and, inspired by rock-flautists Richard Meier and Ian Anderson, retrained as a flautist.

=== Early concerts ===
Their first performance took place in March 1973 at their rehearsal base, a small country venue, while others place it at the Leningrad restaurant "Hold" at Central Park of Culture and Recreation, for which they were paid 50 rubles in cash.

In the 1970s and early 1980s, rock and roll was strictly regulated in the Soviet Union, and only a few artists managed to be approved and signed by the government record label Melodiya. Aquarium's usual concert venues were private apartments and they faced many years of fierce competition to land a spot on the label. These "apartment concerts" (квартирники) were a unique Soviet phenomenon created by underground musicians. They were usually acoustic, as noise could cause the neighbors to call the Militsiya, but the limited space fostered an atmosphere of intimacy between the group and its audience, who listened with bated breath, perhaps with someone recording the concert on a simple tape recorder. This was similar to the concept of the Russian bards.

In 1973, Aquarium performed their first live concert, but did not follow it up with regular concerts.

=== Home recording albums ===
While on vacation in January–February 1974, Grebenshchikov and George recorded their debut album The Temptation of St. Aquarium/Iskushenie Svyatogo Akvariuma (Russian: Искушение святого Аквариума). The band recorded the album with home recording equipment, with variable sound quality results. The Temptation of St. Aquarium was long thought lost, but in 1997 the record was found and released in 2001 on CD in the book Prehistoric Aquarium. All masters of this record appear to have been lost. Their second album was called Parables of Count Diffusor and was written by Grebenshchikov, George Fan and Dyusha Romanov, probably in the spring of 1975. They followed this up in 1976 with their third album, S Toy Storony Zerkalnogo Stekla, or From the Other Side of a Mirror Glass (Russian: С той стороны зеркального стекла), named using a line from an Arseny Tarkovsky poem.

=== Theatre and regular performances ===
In 1974 the group became heavily involved in amateur theatre, playing pieces of absurdity on the steps of the Engineers' Castle. However, when the theater was headed by professional director Eric Goroshevsky, Grebenshchikov became disillusioned with the idea of a fusion of rock, poetry and theatre, and shifted Aquarium's focus to concentrate on musical activities (though they only made a complete break from the theatre group in 1977). George left the band, but kept in touch with its members. The following year, cellist Vsevolod (Seva) Gakkel joined the band .

Aquarium began to regularly perform live in 1976. Their first concert was on February 25, 1976, jointly with Grebenshchikov, Gakkel and Dyusha Romanov. On March 10 Aquarium was a surprise guest at the Tallinn Festival of Popular Music, where they played a set of four acoustic songs and won the prize for the most interesting and varied program.

In 1977 Romanov and bassoon player Alexander "Fagot" Alexandrov ("fagot" ["фагот"] meaning bassoon in Russian) were drafted in the military for two years. With the loss of these members, Grebenshchikov recorded a highly successful solo album All Brothers are Sisters (Vse brat'ya - sestry). Aquarium also became popular to the point that Grebenshchikov was recognised in the street. In 1979 the band met with two important figures of Soviet rock, critic Artemy Troitsky and next year start to work with Andrei Tropillo as a manager in whose studio Aquarium recorded its first 'historic' albums.

=== Tbilisi Rock Festival ===
Aquarium burst into the consciousness of the Soviet rock scene by competing at the 1980 Tbilisi Rock Festival. The band caused a scandal with their performance, which was considered bizarre and shocking. During the set, Grebenshchikov lay down on the stage and made provocative movements while playing the guitar, causing all the jury members to demonstratively leave the hall. Aquarium was accused of promoting homosexuality (the guitar actions), incest (Grebenshchikov changed words while singing the song "Marina", though this may have been through poor technique) and indecency, and banned from the festival. The incident became known in Leningrad, and as a result Grebenshchikov lost his job and was expelled from the Komsomol (Young Communist's League, expected of working Russians). However, while they did not receive any prizes, the band's performance made them become a symbol of the Soviet alternative culture.

Until 1987, Aquarium recorded all of their albums in live concerts and in a self-assembled underground studio (several members had engineering education) disguised as a "Young Technicians Club". A notable exception was the album Radio Africa (1983), which was secretly recorded using a government-owned mobile studio, after bribing a technician.

=== Mainstream success ===
The advent of Glasnost in the second half of the 1980s brought many underground Russian rock musicians to public recognition and Aquarium became one of the most popular acts. They were allowed to play in large concert halls, appeared on state-owned television and recorded soundtracks for several films, most notably Assa. In 1987 they recorded their first album for the state-owned Melodiya record label. With official backing and legalized distribution the album was a huge hit in the Soviet Union, selling well over a million copies within a few months. Grebenshchikov subsequently recorded two albums in English and toured with several different backing bands. In 1992, after the break-up of the Soviet Union, he released music under the name The BG-Band, The Russian Album, a collection of melancholic folk songs influenced by his travels all over Russia and demonstrating a return to his Russian roots.

== Second lineup (1992–present) ==
Grebenshchikov kept touring and shortly returned to calling his band "Aquarium", although the lineup bore little resemblance to the original band. In 1996, Aquarium co-headlined (along with DDT) the VladiROCKstok music festival in Vladivostok; at one memorable point, Grebenshchikov famously invited thousands of fans to stream out of their grandstand seats and into the area near the performance stage.

The band continued to release more albums and tour extensively over the former Soviet Union, Eastern Europe, and places with Russian-speaking immigrant communities in Germany, Israel and the United States. In 2007, Aquarium performed for the first time at the Royal Albert Hall in London. In 2008 the "Aquarium International" project (with participation of over 20 musicians worldwide) was created.

Their 2008 album Loshad' Belaya (White Horse) was released in a similar fashion to Radiohead's 2007 In Rainbows: it was offered for free download in mp3 format with the downloader opting to pay the amount they saw fit.

Although often criticized for departure from their original style and constant line-up changes, which made the later incarnations of Aquarium essentially a Grebenshchikov solo project, the group still enjoyed considerable success in Russia with regular radio airplay of their old and new songs, popular albums, and frequent tours.

Aquarium's lineup in 2017 consisted of Boris Grebenshchikov, Andrey Surotdinov (violin), Alexey Zubarev (guitars), Alexander Titov (bass), Liam Bradley (drums) and Brian Finnegan (flute).

== Musical influences ==
Aquarium were strongly influenced by Western rock music, particularly by The Beatles, Bob Dylan, David Bowie, T. Rex, and progressive rock acts like Jethro Tull, King Crimson and Roxy Music as well as by new wave and reggae artists. This was reflected in the band's often complex compositions and wide-ranging lyric themes, even including references to Celtic and Indian cultures.

== Discography ==
=== Albums ===
Date	Title	Translation	Notes
Albums (archival) from the 1970s
1973	Iskushenie Svyatogo Akvariuma	Temptation of St.Aquarium	
1973	Menuet Zemledeltsu	Farmer's Minuet	
1974	Pritchi Grafa Diffuzora	Parables of Count Diffusor	
1976	S Toy Storony Zerkalnogo Stekla	From The Other Side of Mirror Glass	
1978	Vse Bratya – Syostry	All Brothers are Sisters	
Studio albums
1981	Sinii Albom	The Blue Album	
1981	Treugolnik	Triangle	
1981	Elektrichestvo	Electricity: History of Aquarium, Vol. 2	
1982	Akustika	Acoustics: History of Aquarium, Vol. 1	
1982	Tabu	Taboo	
1983	Radio Africa		
1984	Ikhtiologia	Ichthyology	
1984	Den’ Serebra	The Day of Silver	
1986	Deti Dekabrya	December's Children	
1986	Desyat’ Strel	Ten Arrows	
1987	Ravnodenstvie	Equinox	
1987	Feodalizm	Feudalism	
1992	Russkii Albom	Russian Album	Released as BG-Band
1993	Lyubimie Pesni Ramzesa IV	Favorite Songs of Rameses the IV	
1994	Kostroma Mon Amour	Kostroma my Love	
1994	Peski Peterburga	Sands of Petersburg	
1995	Navigator	Navigator	
1996	Snezhnii Lev	Snow Lion	
1997	Hyperborea	Hyperborea	
1997	Lilit	Lilith (US: Black Moon )	Released as BG and The Band
1999	Psi (Ψ)		
2002	Sestra Haos	Sister Chaos	
2003	Pesni Rybaka	Fisherman's Songs	
2005	Zoom Zoom Zoom		
2006	Bespechny Russkiy Brodyaga	Careless Russian Rover	
2008	Loshad' Belaya	White Horse	
2009	Pushkinskaya 10	Poushkine Street, 10	
2011	Arkhangelsk	Archangelsk	
2013	Aquarium Plus	Aquarium Plus	
2020	Tor	Thor	
2023	Dom Vseh Svyatyh	Home of All Hallows	
2026	Странные Новости с Далёкой Звезды	Strange News from a Distant Star	
Live albums
1982	Arox & Shtyor		
1982	Desyat Let	Ten Years	
1982	Electroshock	Electric Shock	
1993	Pis'ma Kapitana Voronina	Letters of Captain Voronine	
1993	Vizit v Moskvu	Visit to Moscow	
1994	Akvarium na Taganke	Aquarium at Taganka	
1995	Tsentr Tsiklona	Center of the Cyclone	
1996	Sezon dlya Zmey	Snake Season	
1996	Dvadtsat Let Spustya	Twenty Years Later	
1997	Akvarium-25, Istoriya	Aquarium-25. The History	
1998	Molitva i Post	Prayer and Fasting	
2008	The Royal Albert Hall		
Songs performed by Aquarium Incognito
1994	Anna Karenina Quartet. “Zadushevnye pesni”	Soul Songs	
1997	Russian-Abyssinian Orchestra “Bardo”		
2000	Terrarium. "Pyatiugolnii Grekh"	Terrarium. "Pentangular Sin"	
2015	Terrarium. "3=8"		
Compilations
1986	Red Wave		
2003	Russian Songwriter: A Collection from Boris Grebenshikov		US release
2020	Aquarium in Dub		Remix album feat. Lee "Scratch" Perry
2021	Dan'		Tribute album to various Russian artists

== Filmography ==
=== Documentary films about Aquarium and Grebenshchikov ===
- Rok (Russian: «Рок», lit. 'Rock'; 1987), dir. Alexei Uchitel, Soviet Union
- The Long Way Home (1989), dir. Michael Apted, United States

=== Soundtracks by Aquarium ===
- Ivanov (Russian: «Иванов»; 1981), student film, dir. Aleksandr Nekhoroshev, Aleksandr Ilkhovsky
- Assa (1987), dir. Sergei Solovyov
- Zolotoy Son (Russian: «Золотой сон», lit. 'Golden Dream'; 1989), dir. Sergey Debizhev
- Black Rose Is an Emblem of Sorrow, Red Rose Is an Emblem of Love (1989), dir. Sergei Solovyov
- Dva Kapitana 2 (Russian: «Два капитана 2», lit. 'The Two Captains 2'; 1992), dir. Sergey Debizhev

=== Other ===
In 1991, Dyusha Romanov appeared as on-screen narrator in Leningrad Television's Khraniteli, a two-part version of J. R. R. Tolkien's The Fellowship of the Ring. He also composed the film score, which Aquarium played.
