= Viktor Tsoi =

Soviet musician and actor (1962–1990)

- Виктор Цой
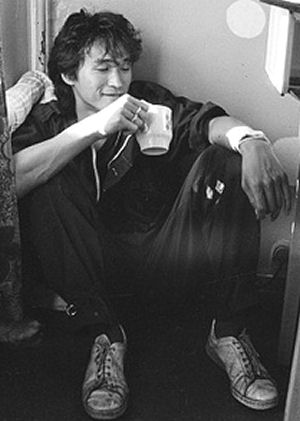
- Tsoi in 1986
- Born: 21 June 1962; Leningrad, Russian SFSR , Soviet Union
- Died: 15 August 1990 (aged 28); Tukums, Latvia
- Cause of death: Traffic collision
- Resting place: Bogoslovskoe Cemetery, Saint Petersburg, Russia
- Occupations: Singer; songwriter; composer; actor
- Years active: 1978–1990
- Spouse: Marianna Tsoi (m. 1985, separated)
- Children: Alexander Tsoi
- Musical career
- Genres: Rock; pop; post-punk; new wave; punk rock; alternative rock; indie rock
- Instruments: Vocals; guitar; bass; piano
- Labels: AnTrop; Melodiya
- Formerly of: Kino; Avtomaticheskiye Udovletvoriteli; Palata No. 6

Viktor Robertovich Tsoi (Note: In this name that follows East Slavic naming customs, the patronymic is Robertovich and the family name is Tsoi.) (Russian: Виктор Робертович Цой, IPA: [ˈvʲiktər ˈrobʲɪrtəvʲɪtɕ ˈtsoj]; 21 June, 1962 – 15 August, 1990) was a Soviet singer-songwriter, artist and actor who co-founded Kino, one of the most popular and influential bands in the history of Russian music.

Born and raised in Leningrad (now Saint Petersburg) to a Russian mother and Koryo-saram father, Tsoi started writing songs as a teenager. Throughout his career, Tsoi contributed a plethora of musical and artistic works, including ten albums. After Kino appeared and performed in the 1987 Soviet film Assa, the band's popularity surged, triggering a period referred to as "Kinomania", and leading to Tsoi's leading role in the 1988 Kazakh new wave art film The Needle. In 1990, after a high-profile concert at Moscow’s Luzhniki Stadium, Tsoi briefly relocated to Latvia with bandmate Yuri Kasparyan to work on the band's next album. Two months after the concert, Tsoi died in a traffic collision.

Tsoi was one of the most important pioneers of rock music in Russia and is credited with popularizing the genre throughout the Soviet Union. Becoming popular by combining his music and lyrics with philosophy, he retains a devoted following throughout the former Soviet Union, where he is known as one of the most influential and popular people in the history of Russian music.

== Life and career ==
=== Early years ===
Viktor Robertovich Tsoi was born on 21 June 1962, in a maternity hospital on Kuznetsovskaya Street in Leningrad. He was the only child of Valentina Vasilyevna Tsoi (née Guseva), a Russian schoolteacher, and Robert Maximovich Tsoi, a Soviet Korean engineer from Kyzylorda, Kazakhstan, where his Korean parents had been exiled after Stalin's 1937 deportation of Koreans in the Soviet Union. The family's Korean ancestry can be traced back to Kimchaek (Songjin) in the present-day North Korea, where Viktor's great-grandfather Choi Yong-nam was born in 1893.

Tsoi's Korean clan was the Wonju Choe clan, sometimes spelled as Choi. Koryo-saram, ethnic Koreans living in the former USSR, preferred the surname Tsoi as a romanization of the cyrillic Цой. Translated from Korean, the surname Choi means "height" or "top".

Tsoi grew up in the vicinity of the Moskovsky Victory Park. The family lived in the notable "general's house" at the corner of Moskovsky Avenue and Basseynaya Street. For some time, Tsoi studied at a nearby school on Frunze Street, where his mother worked.

From 1974 until 1977, Tsoi attended a secondary art school, where he was a member of the band Palata No. 6 (Russian: Палата № 6, English: "Ward No. 6"). The only surviving recording of the group is an album titled "Slonolunie" (a portmanteau of slon, “elephant”, and polnolunie, “full moon”). Around the same time, he wrote his first two songs – "Vasya Loves Disco" and "Idiot", though neither were ever performed.

From 1977, he attended the Serov Art School, until he was expelled in 1979 for poor academic performance. Afterwards, he attended SGPTU-61, a secondary city vocational school, where he studied to become a woodcarver. In his youth, he was a fan of Mikhail Boyarsky and Vladimir Vysotsky, and later Bruce Lee, after whom he started modelling his image. He was fond of martial arts and often sparred "in Chinese" with bandmate Yuri Kasparyan.

=== First steps in music ===
Tsoi began writing songs at the age of 17. In the 1970s and the 1980s, rock music was an underground movement limited mostly to Leningrad. Moscow pop stars, endorsed by the Soviet state, ruled the charts and received the most exposure from the media. Rock music was not popular with the government, and rock bands received little to no funding and were given little exposure by the media. The Leningrad Rock Club was one of the few public places where rock bands were allowed to perform.

In the late 1970s and early 1980s, Tsoi was a close friend of Alexei Rybin. Rybin, a member of the hard rock band Piligrimy (Russian: Пилигримы, lit. 'Pilgrims'), and Tsoi, who played bass guitar in the group Palata # 6 (Russian: Палата № 6, lit. 'Ward No. 6'), met at the house of Andrei "Svin" Panov, in whose apartment people and musicians often gathered, and also where his own punk band Avtomaticheskiye Udovletvoriteli rehearsed. By this time, Tsoi began to perform the songs he wrote at parties.

Tsoi and Rybin, as members of Avtomaticheskiye Udovletvoriteli, went to Moscow and performed punk-rock metal at Artemy Troitsky's underground concerts. During a similar performance in Leningrad on the occasion of Andrei Tropillo's anniversary, Tsoi and Rybin first met Boris Grebenshchikov. Later, after a solo concert by Grebenshchikov, they met up and Tsoi played two of his songs to him. Grebenshchikov, who had already been a relatively established musician in the Leningrad underground scene, was very impressed by Tsoi's talent and helped him start up his own band.

=== Beginnings of Kino ===
At the Leningrad Rock Club, Tsoi played as a solo artist supported by members of the band Aquarium. Tsoi's lyrics and music impressed the crowd. In the summer of 1981, Tsoi, Rybin, and Oleg Valinsky formed the band Garin i giperboloydy (Russian: Гарин и Гиперболоиды, lit. 'Garin and the hyperboloids'). The name was an homage to the classic Russian novel The Hyperboloid of Engineer Garin by Aleksey Tolstoy. In autumn 1981, the band was admitted to membership of the Leningrad Rock Club. Not long after, Valinsky was conscripted into the army, leaving only Tsoi and Rybin, who renamed the band to Kino. Kino began recording its debut album in the spring of 1982.

=== First albums ===
In the spring of 1982, Kino began recording its debut album 45 at Andrei Tropillo's studio. Members of Aquarium took part in the recording, with Boris Grebenshchikov directing the album. By the summer, the album was completely finished. Its duration was 45 minutes, after which the album was named 45. The album got some distribution and Kino performed in many apartment concerts in Moscow and Leningrad.

On 19 February 1983, a joint concert with Kino and Aquarium took place. After the concert, Yuri Kasparyan was invited to join the band as a guitarist. In the spring, Rybin left Kino due to disagreements with Tsoi. Tsoi and Kasparyan spent the summer on joint rehearsals. As a result, Kino recorded the album 46, which was initially thought of as a demo for Nachalnik Kamchatki (Russian: Начальник Камчатки, lit. 'Chief of Kamchatka'). 46 was widely distributed and was considered to be a full-fledged album. In the fall of 1983, Tsoi went to a psychiatric hospital in Pryazhka, where he spent a month and a half. As a result, Tsoi was not conscripted into the army. After being discharged from the psychiatric hospital, he wrote the song "Trankvilizator" (Russian: Транквилизатор, lit. 'Tranquilizer').

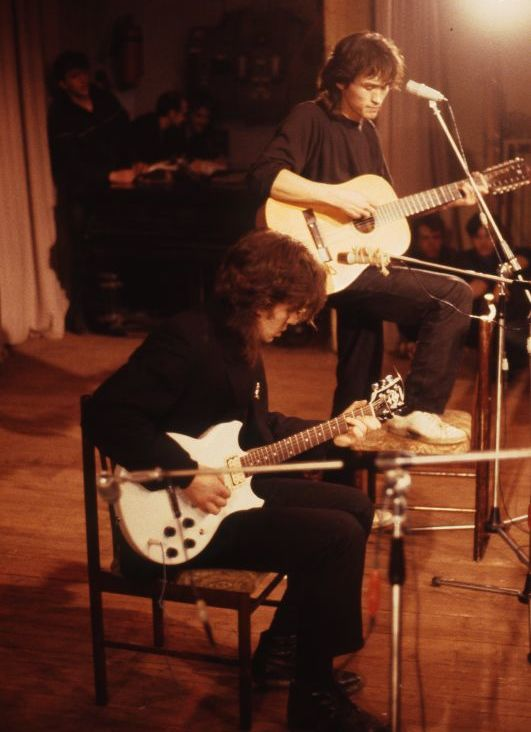
Tsoi (standing) performing with Yuri Kasparyan (seated) in 1986

"Peremen!" ("Changes"), first performed by Tsoi in the summer of 1986, became heavily associated with the social shifts of the Perestroika era and later saw use in various post-Soviet political movements, such as the 2020–2021 Belarusian protests.

Despite the song later becoming a staple of political demonstrations, its politicization took place against the wishes of Viktor Tsoi, who insisted that the track was not a protest song.

=== Rise to fame ===
1987 marked a major turning point for Kino with the release of their 6th album Gruppa krovi (Russian: Группа крови, lit. 'Blood Type'), which sparked widespread public devotion known as "Kinomania." Benefiting from the cultural shifts of Glasnost, the album allowed the band to record with a polished, spacious production style and sophisticated sound that set a new standard for Soviet rock.

The album's atmospheric soundscapes and distinct lyrical themes resonated deeply with youth across the Soviet Union, propelling Kino to mainstream prominence. Songs from the record were widely shared, and fans across the diverse Soviet republics translated the originally Russian lyrics into their native languages as the band's cultural reach expanded nationwide.

Over the next few years, Tsoi appeared in several successful movies and also travelled to the United States to promote his films at film festivals. Several more albums were released, continuing to resonate deeply with listeners and further fueling the band's massive popularity. Even though Tsoi was a huge star, he still lived a relatively ordinary life. He kept his old job in the boiler room of an apartment building, called Kamchatka, which is currently a museum/club dedicated to the singer.

The fact that he worked at a boiler plant surprised many people. Tsoi said that he enjoyed the work and he also needed the money to support the band, as they still received no government support and their albums were copied and passed around the nation via Magnitizdat free of charge. In addition, he had to maintain regular employment to avoid prosecution for social parasitism, as the state did not consider his musical career to be work. This made Tsoi even more popular among the people because it showed that he was down to earth and they could relate to him. He also went on tour in 1988–1989 to Italy, France, and Denmark. Kino's finest hour came in 1990 with a concert at Moscow's Luzhniki Stadium; 62,000 fans filled the stands to celebrate the triumph of the USSR's most successful rock group. It also was one of the four times the Luzhniki Olympic Fire was ever lit.

=== Film appearances ===
In 1987, the band Kino, along with other Russian rock bands, appeared as themselves in Assa (Russian: Асса), a film by Sergei Solovyov. The film features underground rock music prominently, with Kino making a notable concluding performance appearance.

In 1988, Viktor Tsoi starred as the protagonist in The Needle (Russian: Игла, romanized: Igla), directed by Rashid Nugmanov and written by Aleksandr Baranov and Bakhyt Kilibayev. The plot is centered around the character Moro, who returns to Almaty, Kazakhstan, to collect money owed to him. While waiting out an unexpected delay, he visits his former girlfriend Dina and discovers she has become a morphine addict. He decides to help her quit and fight the local drug mafia responsible for her condition. But Moro finds a deadly opponent in "the doctor," the mafia kingpin who is exploiting Dina. Tsoi was nominated for an award for his role in the film.

The film's soundtrack, including original music by Tsoi's band Kino, contributes to the overall feeling of the movie, in addition to the film's use of post-modern twists and surreal scenes.

The film premiered in the Soviet Union in March 1988.

=== Art ===
Tsoi was from the age 12 to 14 enrolled in the oldest art school in Russia, nowadays named N. K. Roerich St. Petersburg Art School. Tsoi would make netsuke figurines along with drawings. Despite him being accepted into an art college he chose to study cabinetmaking. However Tsoi was still creating art in different forms and continued to do so up until his death. His choice of mediums and tools would be by today considered a little childish due to him often using water based felt tip pens or cardboard as canvases, but he also made works with oil, acrylics and watercolor. Keith Harring was one of his inspirations which can be seen in his pieces. Other reoccurring themes in his pieces are daily life activities and violence.

In the summer of 2025, one of Tsoi's drawings was sold for half a million euros. Commenting on the deal, Dmitry Mishenin noted: "In five years [from 2020 to 2025], prices for Victor's work have increased exactly tenfold.… Considering that there are only a few paintings, their cost, I think, will start at one million euros and above. If someone manages to buy something for 500,000 euros, then consider yourself very lucky. And this is just the beginning".

Speaking about Tsoi as an artist, Yuri Kasparyan said that "the richest archives belong to Natalia Razlogova, Tsoi's son Alexander and his father Robert Maximovich."

== Death ==
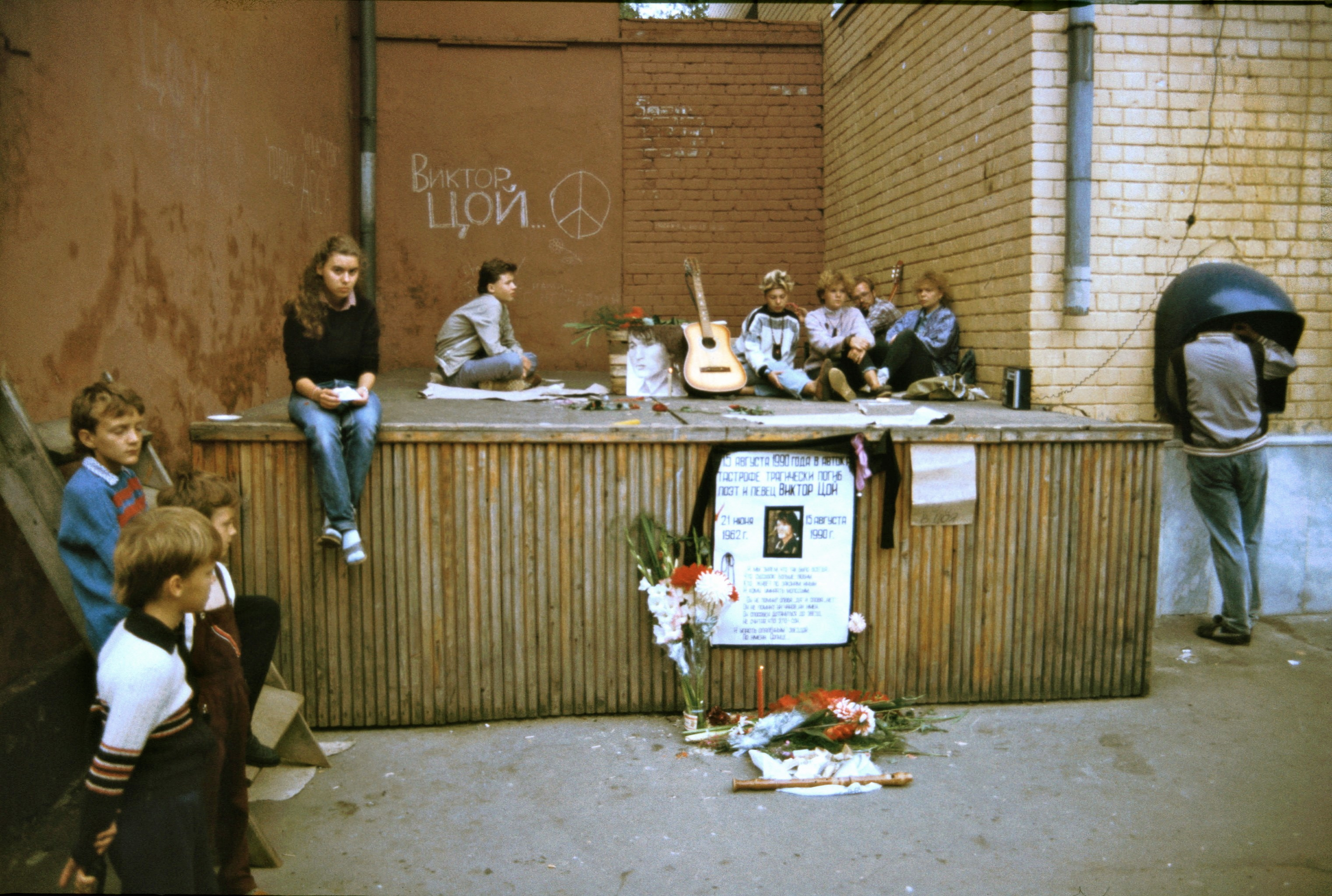
Tsoi's fans mourning in Leningrad

On 15 August 1990, in Latvia, Tsoi was driving on the Sloka – Talsi highway, near Tukums and Engure. At 12:28 p.m., Tsoi died in a car collision. The investigation concluded that Tsoi had fallen asleep while driving, possibly due to fatigue. He had not consumed alcohol for at least 48 hours before his death.

At the time he fell asleep, Tsoi was driving at a speed of at least 100 km/h (62 mph), causing his dark blue Moskvitch-2141 to turn into the oncoming lane and collide with an Ikarus 250 bus, 35 km (22 mi) on the highway from Sloka. Tsoi was pronounced dead at the scene. Neither the driver nor the bus was badly injured or damaged. Tsoi's car was completely destroyed, to the point that one of its tires was never found.

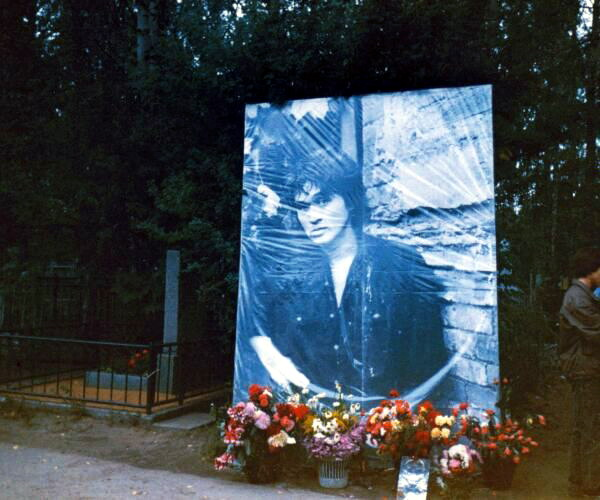
Tributes left at Tsoi's grave in St. Petersburg on the first anniversary of his death

The death of Viktor Tsoi was a shock to many fans, with several reportedly killing themselves out of grief. On 17 August, Komsomolskaya Pravda, one of the main Soviet newspapers, had the following to say about Tsoi and his meaning to the youth of the nation:

Tsoi means more to the young people of our nation than any politician, celebrity or writer. This is because Tsoi never lied and never sold out. He was and remains himself. It's impossible not to believe him... Tsoi is the only rocker who has no difference between his image and his real life, he lived the way he sang... Tsoi is the last hero of rock.

On 19 August, he was buried in a closed casket at the Bogoslovskoe Cemetery in Leningrad. Thousands of people came to the funeral.

Kasparyan left for Leningrad prior to the collision, with a tape containing the only recording of Tsoi's vocals for the band's next album. The remaining members of Kino finished and released the Black Album in December. It later became one of the band's most popular albums.

== Personal life ==
Viktor lived with his wife, Marianna Tsoi, and his son Alexander (born 1985). Tsoi lived a poor life, with Marianna saying that they could not even afford a proper wedding dress. The apartment building boiler room he worked at was nicknamed "Kamchatka", and is now the site of a museum and rock club dedicated to Tsoi. He also previously worked in Kiev, Ukrainian SSR, but after the authorities found out he was working illegally, he was sent to Moscow.

During the filming of Assa, Tsoi met Natalia Razlogova, the director's assistant. Tsoi later fell in love with Razlogova and separated from Marianna. However, they did not divorce, for the sake of their son. Joanna Stingray called her Tsoi's second wife. The love story of Viktor Tsoi and Natalia Razlogova is told in the book by Joanna "Stingray Through the Looking Glass".

== Legacy ==
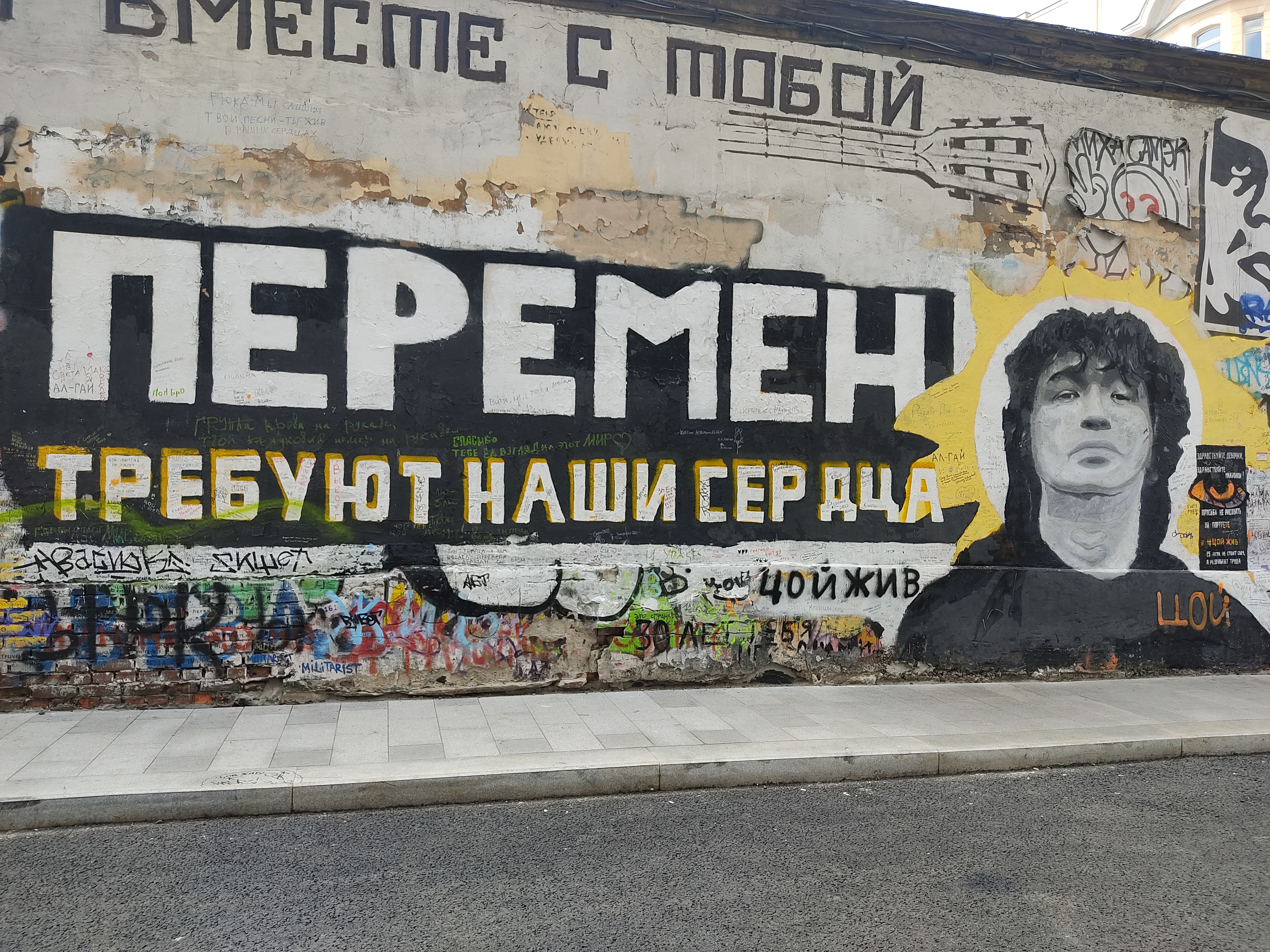
The Tsoi Wall in the Arbat District of Moscow

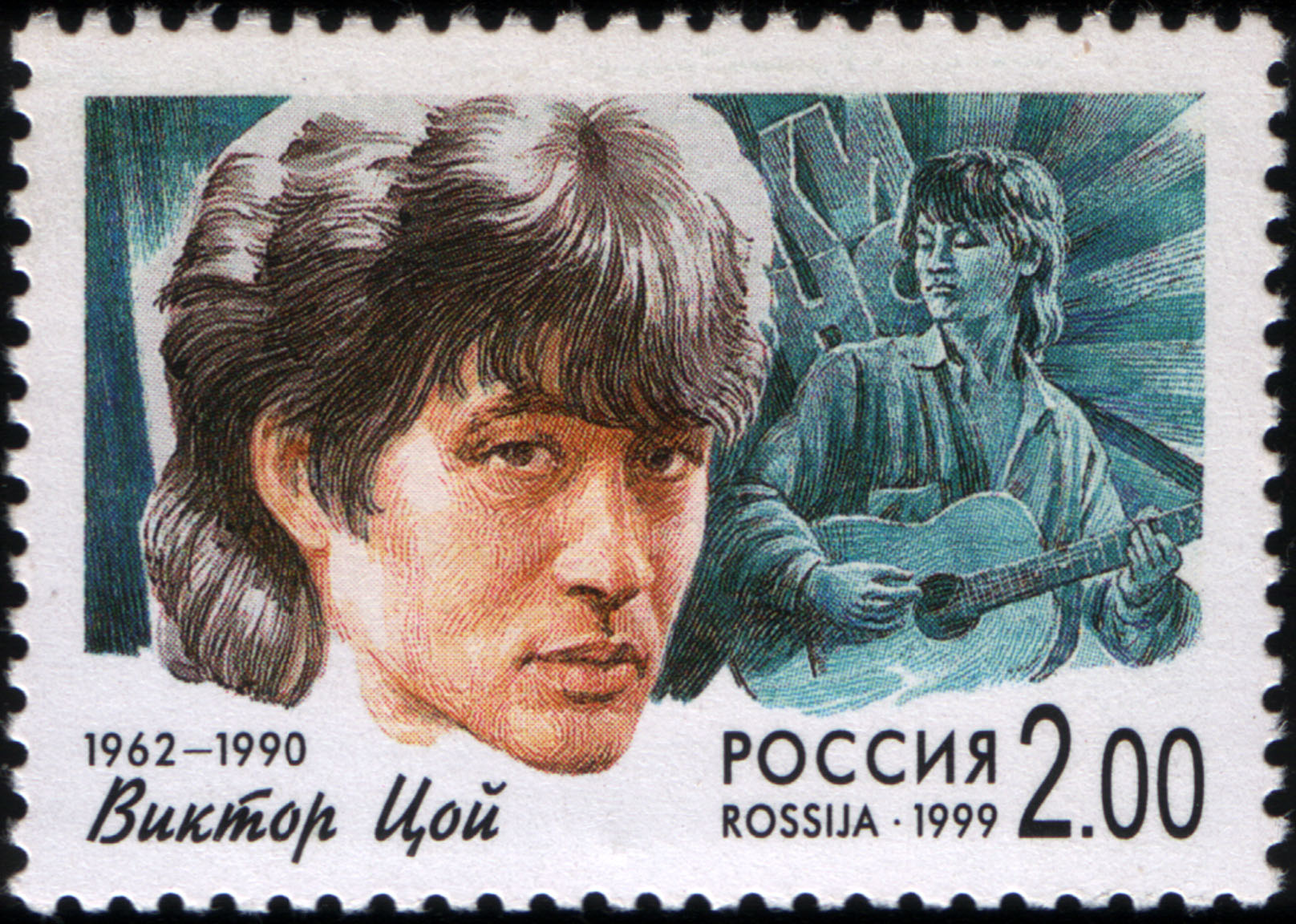
A Russian stamp devoted to Viktor Tsoi, 1999

Portraits of Viktor Tsoi are displayed today in many places around Russia, from graffiti on the fences of Saint Petersburg to an entire wall dedicated to Viktor Tsoi in a bylane of the famous Arbat Street in Moscow, where fans still gather to remember their hero. Other Tsoi Walls can also be found in Minsk, Belarus and in some regions of Kazakhstan. In 2000 some of the nation's top rock bands came together and released their interpretations of Kino's best songs as a tribute to Viktor Tsoi on what would have been his 38th birthday.

In 2012, on what would have been Tsoi's 50th birthday, the remaining members of Kino gathered to record the song "Ataman" (Russian: «Атаман»), with his vocals that were recovered from his car crash but never used because of its poor quality. The drummer Georgiy Guryanov died in July 2013, making "Ataman" the last song recorded by Kino and its members.

On 15 August 2020, the 30th anniversary of Tsoi's death was marked. In memory of Tsoi, the Palace Bridge in St. Petersburg was lifted to his songs. Fans across the country commemorated his death, especially in his home city of St. Petersburg where a number of events and concerts were organised, as well as at the Tsoi Wall in Moscow. The day before, a 4-metre (13 ft) tall monument dedicated to Tsoi was erected in St. Petersburg in his memory.

The South Korean rock band YB covered the song "Gruppa krovi" (Russian: «Группа крови», lit. 'Blood Type'; Korean: 혈액형) on their 1999 album Korean Rock Remade (Korean: 한국 ROCK 다시 부르기).

Viktor An, a South Korean-born Russian short track speed skater, chose his Russian name "Viktor" in honour of Tsoi.

=== In popular culture ===
- Joanna Stingray commemorated him in her song, "Tsoi Song".
- On 21 June 2012, Google commemorated Tsoi's 50th birthday with a Google Doodle reminiscent of the Tsoi Wall.
- In 2015, Tsoi's song "Kukushka" (Russian: «Кукушка», lit. 'Cuckoo') was covered by Russian singer Polina Gagarina for the movie Battle for Sevastopol.
- In the 2018 film Leto, Tsoi was played by Teo Yoo.
- In 2018, a monument to Tsoi was erected in Almaty, Kazakhstan.
- In the 2019 video game Metro Exodus, multiple songs by Kino can be heard on the radio during segments set on a train as it travels across Russia.
- On July 21, 2019, during their concert in Moscow, Metallica played a cover of 'Gruppa Krovi'.
- In the 2020 video game Cyberpunk 2077, graffiti reading "цой жив" (Tsoi lives) can be found in various locations.
- In the 2008 video game Grand Theft Auto IV, his song Группа Крови could be heard on the in-game Vladivostok FM radio before getting removed.
- In 2024 the song Группа Крови can also be heard in the film Kraven the Hunter during a scene at the Gym in the Russian Prison, were the Mobsters try to push Kraven.
- There is a peak near Almaty, Kazakhstan, which is named after him called Viktor Tsoi Peak (Пик Виктора Цойя)
- On September 30th, 2025, William Gibson revealed that Viktor Tsoi has been the major musical influence in his work.
- On February 14th, 2024, War Thunder released the full cover of 'Gruppa Krovi' titled 'Wish Me Luck' which was exclusively composed for the 'Drone age' update trailer back in 2022.

== Cited sources ==
- Zhitinsky, A. N. (2012). Tsoi Forever. St. Petersburg: Amphora. ISBN 978-5-699-37227-0.
- Kalgin, V. N. Viktor Tsoi . - Molodaya Gvardiya, 2015. - 368 p. - (The Life of Remarkable People, Small Series; issue 77). ISBN 978-5-235-03751-9 .
