= Timur Novikov =

Russian artist (1958–2002)

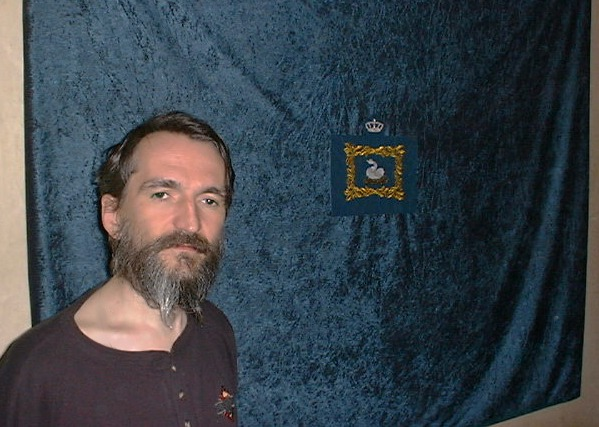
- Novikov in 2000
- Born: Timur Petrovich Novikov; 24 September 1958; Leningrad (now Saint Petersburg), Russian SFSR, Soviet Union
- Died: 23 May 2002 (aged 43); Saint Petersburg, Russia
- Education: Art Club, House of Pioneers, Leningrad; Young Art Historians Club, Leningrad; Institut des Arts Plastiques de Paris, France
- Known for: Painting, graphic art, design, film, art theory, philosophy, textiles
- Movement: Soviet Nonconformist Art
- Awards: Nika Award (design), 1987

Timur Petrovich Novikov (September 24, 1958 – May 23, 2002) was a Russian visual artist, designer, art theorist, philosopher, and musician. He is considered one of the most influential proponents of Nonconformist Art before and after the dissolution of the Soviet Union in 1991.

== Life and work ==
As he grew up in the Soviet Union, Novikov experienced its cultural and political constraints. His artistic education began at the age of seven at the House of Pioneers in Leningrad (now St. Petersburg), and later at the Young Art Historians Club at the Russian Museum in the same city.

In 1977, he became a member of the Letopis (Chronicles) art group; and in 1982 he founded the Новый художник (New Artists) movement. During the 1980s, Novikov worked at the Russian Museum and enjoyed access to its collection and archive, as well as close working relationships with its curators. This connection lasted until he started to work as an artist. In 1990 and 1991, he studied as an intern at the Institut des Arts Plastiques (Institute of Plastic Arts) in Paris, France.

During the 1980s and 1990s, Novikov was a regular participant in the Pop Mechanics show of experimental composer Sergey Kuryokhin and worked on its stage design. Several pop groups from the show worked with him to explore a new visual and stage design. In 1983, Novikov founded and led an experimental rock-group Новые композиторы (New Composers) and invented new musical instruments for it. He was also involved in a number of film projects as an actor and artist, and made a name as an innovative film designer. In 1987, Novikov shared the Nika Award for his contribution to the popular Russian film Assa, directed by Sergei Solovyov.

The New Academy of Fine Arts, founded by Novikov in 1989, soon became a well-known meeting point for the Leningrad, Russian, and international art scene, as well as a symbol for the spirit of freedom and recomposition in the new Russia. The academy and artist community Pushkinskaya 10, which named after its address in St Petersburg, was at first self-organized by artists. It later offered ateliers as well as regular courses for students, including scholarships. The academy, with Novikov as one of its most prominent teachers, was sometimes referred to as an underground art project, but also cooperated with established art institutions, among them the Russian Museum and the Hermitage Museum.

The core conception of the academy was called Neo-Academism and comprised a specific teacher-student relationship as well as a focus on the historic and aesthetic perspective of Neoclassicism.

Novikov also contributed to numerous art exhibitions outside Russia. His style of painting combined a bold avant-garde attitude with refined classically based conceptions of Neo-Academism. Furthermore, he contributed to contemporary art theory, writing books such as "The New Russian Classicism" (1998), "Horizons" (2000), and "Intercontacts" (2000), published by the Russian Museum.

A lengthy illness led to blindness in the later part of Novikov's career. He continued working as a lecturer at the New Academy and led assistants to work on graphic works. Novikov died of pneumonia on May 23, 2002, in St. Petersburg.

Posthumous exhibitions of Novikov's works were held at the Moscow Russian Museum and in Brussels in 2002, in Denmark in 2004, London in 2005 and 2012, and several times in St. Petersburg. In the spring of 2013, the Moscow Museum of Modern Art presented a large-scale solo retrospective of Novikov's work, curated by Ekaterina Andreeva, the leading academic researcher at the State Russian Museum and author of Novikov's biography.

=== Popular culture ===
In 2015, Novikov's estate collaborated with Russian streetwear designer Gosha Rubchinskiy. The resulting collection consisted of T-shirts, sweatshirts and caps incorporating designs from Novikov's work. The 'eternal sun' motif is the standout design element and had previously been appropriated by Rubchinskiy, who greatly reveres his art. The pieces were very well received, selling out within minutes on the Dover Street Market e-shop.

== Public collections ==
- Aboa Vetus & Ars Nova (Museum of History and Contemporary Art), Turku, Finland
- Art Museum of Estonia, Tallinn, Estonia
- ART4.RU Contemporary Art Museum, Moscow
- Centre Georges Pompidou, Paris
- Frederick R. Weisman Museum of Art, Los Angeles
- Kaliningrad State Art Gallery, Kaliningrad, Russia
- Ludwig Museum, Budapest
- State Museum of the History of St. Petersburg, St. Petersburg
- Museum of Modern Art, Vienna
- Museum of the New Academy of Fine Arts, St. Petersburg
- Museum of Political History of Russia, St. Petersburg
- National Center for Contemporary Arts, Moscow
- Orel Regional Museum of Fine Art, Orel, Russia
- Pozhalostin Regional and State Art Museum, Ryazan, Russia
- Ruarts Foundation, Moscow
- Schwules Museum, Berlin
- Shchusev State Museum of Architecture, Moscow
- Simferopol State Art Museum, Simferopol, Crimea
- State Russian Museum, St. Petersburg
- State Tretyakov Gallery, Moscow
- Stedelijk Museum, Amsterdam
- Tate Modern, London
- Tsaritsyno Museum, Moscow
- Tver Regional Picture Gallery, Tver, Russia
- Victoria and Albert Museum, London
- Zimmerli Art Museum at Rutgers University, New Brunswick, New Jersey
