= Vsevolod Gakkel =

Vsevolod Gakkel Всеволод Гаккель
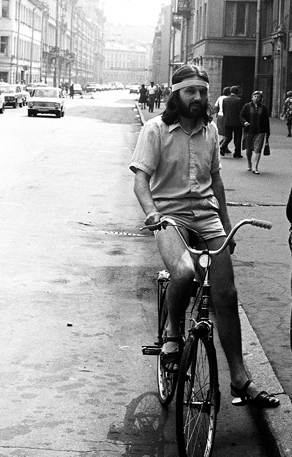
- Vsevolod Gakkel in Leningrad, 1987 (photo by Igor Mukhin)

Background information
- Born: February 19, 1953 (age 73); Leningrad, Soviet Union
- Genres: rock, folk rock, art rock, rock 'n' roll
- Instrument: cello

Vsevolod (Seva) Yakovlevich Gakkel' (Russian: Всеволод (Сева) Яковлевич Гаккель; born 19 February 1953) is a Russian rock musician, who played cello in the band Aquarium. Gakkel founded the club TaMtAm and was the art director of the club Chinese Pilot Jao Da in Saint Petersburg.

== Biography ==
=== Early years ===
Vsevolod Gakkel was born on 19 February 1953 in Leningrad. His father, Yakov Yakovlevich Gakkel, was a prominent Soviet oceanographer, and his paternal grandfather, Yakov Modestovich Gakkel, was an inventor and aircraft designer. He attended music school from a young age, learning to play the cello. As a teenager, he became interested in The Beatles. In eighth grade, he played bass in his school's beat group, Vox. After receiving his academic certificate, he entered film school, but without graduating, he left to serve in the Soviet army. Gakkel served in the city of Marneuli, playing bass during dance evenings as part of the garrison group.

In May 1973, Gakkel returned to Leningrad and got a job at Dom Gramplastinki (Russian: Дом Грампластинки, lit. 'House of Records'), where he worked first as a freight forwarder and then as a loader. In the autumn of the same year, having joined the orchestra of the music school, he met the violinist Nikita Zaitsev, who introduced him to the Leningrad rock underground.

In the summer of 1974, Gakkel joined the folk-rock group Akvarel' (Russian: «Акварель»). In January 1975, Gakkel met Boris Grebenshchikov and Dyusha Romanov at a concert at the club Evrika (Russian: «Эврика»). A few months later, he joined them in Aquarium.

=== Aquarium ===
Gakkel's debut performance as part of Aquarium took place on 2 May 1975 on the beach in Olgino. A year later, he took part in the recording of Grebenshchikov's album S toi storony zerkal'nogo stekla (Russian: «С той стороны зеркального стекла»). Gakkel played bass guitar at Aquarium concerts in the late 1970s, while regular bass guitarist Mikhail Feinstein was serving in the Soviet Army, as well as on some tracks on the albumsTabu and Radio Africa. Gakkel played on all 10 of Aquarium's magnitizdat albums recorded between 1981 and 1986, contributing cello, vocal, and bass parts.

Gakkel left Aquarium during the recording of the album Ravnodenstvie (Russian: «Равноденствие», lit. 'Equinox') in 1987. According to Gakkel, the other musicians mocked his vocal abilities during the recording of the song "Partizany polnoi luny" (Russian: «Партизаны полной луны»), and without waiting for the end of the recording of the song, he packed up his cello and walked out.

Cello player, modern saint and everybody's favorite citizen of Leningrad, Seva has been playing with Aquarium for 15 years, always preferring to stay in the background and rarely taking solos. His musical contribution to the group has not been particularly significant in recent years but spiritually he's meant an awful lot; he's the true conscience of the group.

— Artemy Troitsky, Tusovka: Who's Who in the New Soviet Rock Culture

In June 1988, Gakkel performed with Aquarium at the conference of the International Physicians for the Prevention of Nuclear War in Montreal, in the band's first trip outside of the Soviet Union.

In June 1997, Gakkel performed with Aquarium at concerts organized in honor of the group's 25th anniversary in Moscow and Saint Petersburg.

In October 2000, Gakkel released the book Aquarium kak sposob ukhoda za tennisym kortom (Russian: «Аквариум как способ ухода за теннисным кортом»), a memoir describing his time in Aquarium. The book was initially published by the publishing house Sentyabr' (Russian: «Сентябрь», lit. 'September') and later reprinted by other companies.

=== Other musical endeavors ===
Sound engineer Andrei Tropillo often invited the musicians who happened to be in his studio at the time to the recordings of other groups. As a result, Gakkel played cello on the Kino album 45 and the Alisa album Energiya (Russian: «Энергия», lit. 'Energy'). Gakkel also played bass drum on several songs on the Kino album Nachalnik Kamchatki (Russian: «Начальнике Камчатки»). In 1985, during a temporary disbandment of Aquarium, he collaborated with guitarist and sound engineer Vyacheslav Egorov, recording the album Inorodnoe telo (Russian: «Инородное тело», lit. 'Foreign Body') for the project Akusticheskaya Komissiya (Russian: «Акустическая комиссия», lit. 'Acoustic Commission').

After leaving Aquarium, Gakkel joined a Leningrad blues group called Turetskiy Chai (Russian: «Турецкий чай», lit. 'Turkish Tea') and performed with them in the spring of 1991 at the Yubileiny Sports Palace, at a festival organized in honor of the tenth anniversary of the Leningrad Rock Club. In the same year, he took part in the recording of pianist Yuri Stepanov's (ex-Mify) album Gypsy Love and singer Olga Pershina's album Ballerina's Dream.

From 1992 to 1994, Gakkel played with the post-punk band Nikogda Ne Ver' Khippi (Russian: «Никогда не верь хиппи», lit. 'Never Trust a Hippie') and the neo-psychedelic band Wine. Gakkel participated in performances by Sergey Kuryohkin's Pop Mechanics, until Kuryokhin's death in 1996. In early 1997, Gakkel joined Vermicelli Orchestra. He played on the group's first two albums.

In 2004, Gakkel performed as part of The Optimystica Orchestra, Tequilajazzz frontman Evgeny Fedorov's project with members of Leningrad and Markscheider Kunst. A year later, he took part in the recording of the group's debut album, Polubogi Vina (Russian: «Полубоги вина», lit. 'Demigods of Wine').

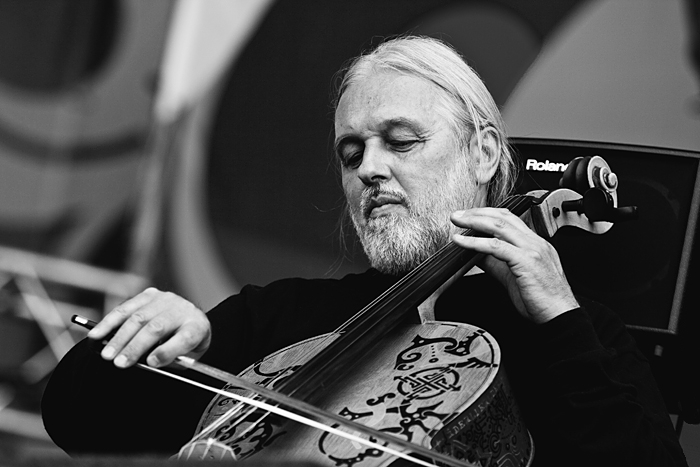
Vsevolod Gakkel at the Sotvorenie Mira (Russian: «Сотворение мира») festival in Kazan

=== Club and festival organization ===
After traveling to the West and visiting intimate rock clubs in New York and San Francisco, Gakkel was inspired to open a similar venue in Saint Petersburg. He opened TaMtAm, the first independent rock club in Saint Petersburg. The club was situated in a former Communist Youth building and provided a small stage in a small room for bands to play on. Gakkel stated that the club's agenda was to recreate a musical underground. TaMtAm became the center of the alternative movement in Saint Petersburg in the 1990s, with Leningrad, Markscheider Kunst, and Tequilajazzz among the bands that frequented the club. During this time, Gakkel managed the group Chimera and organized the recording and release of albums by other musicians associated with TaMtAm, including Jugendshtil' (Russian: «Югендштиль»), The Pauki (Russian: «The Пауки»), and Korol' i Shut (Russian: «Король и Шут»). TaMtAm closed in 1996.

In February 1997, Gakkel held a two-day festival, Drugaya Muzyka (Russian: «Другая музыка», lit. 'Other Music'). From 1998 to 1999, he was the artistic director of the Sergey Kuryokhin International Festival (SKIF).

In addition to working with young musicians, Gakkel helped organize Western artists' Russian tours. In 1995, he invited Peter Hammill to Saint Petersburg and arranged a concert for Van der Graaf Generator. In 2000, Gakkel got a job at the production center Laboratoriya Zvuka (Russian: «Лаборатория звука», lit. 'Sound Laboratory'), where he took part in organizing concerts for King Crimson, Jethro Tull, John McLaughlin, David Sylvian, David Byrne, Brian Eno, and Van der Graaf Generator. In 2003, he took part in organizing Paul McCartney's visit to Saint Petersburg. He appeared in the interview segments of the concert film Paul McCartney in Red Square.

From 2010 to 2012, Gakkel worked as the art director of Chinese Pilot Jao Da (Russian: «Китайский Лётчик Джао Да»), a club in Saint Petersburg. In March 2010, Gakkel began hosting the podcast Priznaki Vremeni (Russian: «Признаки Времени», lit. 'Signs of the Times'), a program about art and creativity. In 2012, he launched the Saint Petersburg branch of the international project BalconyTV.

In 2017, Gakkel appeared in TAMTAM: Muzyka smutnogo vremeni (Russian: «ТАМТАМ: Музыка смутного времени»), a documentary film about TaMtAm directed by Ivan Bortnikov.

As of 2020, he worked as a production manager at the club A2 in Saint Petersburg.
