= Tamtam (rock club) =

TaMtAm (also written as Tamtam, tam-tam, or Тамтам) was an independent rock club in Saint Petersburg, founded Vsevolod Gakkel, the former cellist of Aquarium and operating from 1991 to 1996. TaMtAm was the first Western-style rock club in Saint Petersburg.

== History ==
After traveling to the West and visiting intimate rock clubs in New York and San Francisco, Vsevolod Gakkel was inspired to open a similar venue in Saint Petersburg. In 1991, he founded TaMtAm in Vasilyevsky Island, Saint Petersburg. The club was situated in a former Communist Youth building and provided a small stage in a small room for bands to play on. The club premises were designed by the cult Saint Petersburg artist and tattoo artist Alexey Mikheev.

For the first few months, concerts at TaMtAm were free. Later, a cover charge was introduced to limit the number of attendees and maintain order. Bands performing at TaMtAm were not paid, but were given a crate of beer. The building manager's conditions for allowing Gakkel to use the space were to clean up after every concert and pay for electricity. The club operated unofficially, based on the informal agreement between Gakkel and the building's manager, Sasha Kostrikin. It did not have license to sell alcohol or the rights to conduct commercial activity.

TaMtAm became the center of the alternative movement in Saint Petersburg in the 1990s. TaMtAm provided an alternative scene for those who considered the Leningrad Rock Club scene too conservative. Gakkel's main criterion for choosing groups to perform at the club was that they should not be influenced by the Russian rock (russkii rok) groups of his own generation, and he stated that the club's agenda was to recreate a musical underground. Punk-rock, ska, reggae, rockabilly, and experimental music were among the genres represented at TaMtAm. Some Western artists, such as MDC, David Thomas, and Holy Joy, performed at TaMtAm in exchange for room and board.

In the mid-1990s, the club's reputation was badly damaged due to fighting at concerts, drug dealing, and constant raids by the police. In 1996, the club's building was sold and TaMtAM closed, despite protests and petitions in its defense.

== Legacy ==
Despite its short existence, TaMtAm gave rise to many influential alternative musical groups, referred to as Generation TaMtAm (Russian: «Поколение Тамтама»). The club itself became the starting point for the subsequent creation of similar establishments in Saint Petersburg and Moscow, although many of these were commercial projects that did not share TaMtAm's DIY ideology.

In 2016, KnyaZz released the song "Prizraki Tam-Tama" (Russian: «Призраки Там-Тама», lit. 'Ghosts of Tam-Tam'). The group is led by Andrey Knyazev, a former member of Korol i Shut.

In the summer of 2017, Ivan Bortnikov's documentary film TAMTAM: Muzyka smutnogo vremeni (Russian: «ТАМТАМ: Музыка смутного времени»), which tells the story of the club's creation, was released independently.

== Generation TaMtAm ==
Groups associated with TaMtAm include:

- Chimera
- Jugendstil (Russian: «Югендштиль»)
- Korol i Shut (Russian: «Король и Шут»)
- Leningrad
- Markscheider Kunst
- Messer für Frau Müller (Russian: «Нож для фрау Мюллер»)
- Pilot
- Poslednye Tanki v Parizhe (Russian: «Последние танки в Париже»)
- Skazy Lesa (Russian: «Сказы леса»)
- Spitfire
- Splean
- Tequilajazzz
