= Zhal, net ruzhya! =

Zhal, net ruzhya

Studio album by Korol i Shut
- Released: October 10, 2002
- Recorded: April–September 2002
- Studios: Dobrolyot Studio, Saint Petersburg
- Genres: Horror punk, folk punk
- Label: Misteria Zvuka

Korol i Shut chronology
Kak v staroy skazke (2001)	Zhal, net ruzhya (2002)	Bunt na korablye (2004)

Zhal, net ruzhya (Russian: Жаль, нет ружья) is the sixth studio album by Russian horror punk band Korol i Shut, released on 10 October 2002 by Misteria Zvuka. It is the last album recorded with the band's classic lineup, featuring violinist Maria Nefyodova.

== Background and recording ==
The album was conceived and recorded in 2002 following a brief period of rehearsals. Work began in April 2002, and recording took place at Dobrolyot Studio in Saint Petersburg. The process lasted longer than expected due to reworking of some lyrics and vocal arrangements.

Several tracks were written earlier. "P'yanka" and "Predstavlyayu ya" predate the sessions, while demos for "Volosokrad" and "Nekromant" date back to the early 1990s.

== Musical style and themes ==
The album combines horror punk with theatrical rock and folk influences. The lyrics draw on grotesque storytelling and Russian folklore. Nefyodova's violin adds a distinctive timbre to the sound.

== Reception ==
The album received mixed to positive reviews. Critics noted a darker, more somber tone compared to previous releases. Fans praised tracks like "Nekromant", "Volosokrad", and the title song.

== Artwork ==
The album's artwork and promotional materials continued the band's gothic and horror aesthetic.

== Track listing ==
The album contains 16 tracks and was released on CD and digital streaming platforms such as Yandex.Music.

== Personnel ==
- Mikhail Gorsheniov – vocals
- Andrei Knyazev – vocals
- Yakov Tsvirkunov – guitar
- Alexander Balunov – bass
- Alexander Shchigoliev – drums
- Maria Nefyodova – violin

== Legacy ==
Zhal', net ruzh'ya marked the end of an era for Korol i Shut. It was the final studio album with violinist Maria Nefyodova and is often seen as the culmination of the band's folk-horror style before they transitioned to a more rock-oriented sound.
