= Ilosaarirock =

Rock music festival held in Joensuu, Finland

Coordinates: 62.59642°N 29.73639°E

Ilosaarirock Festival
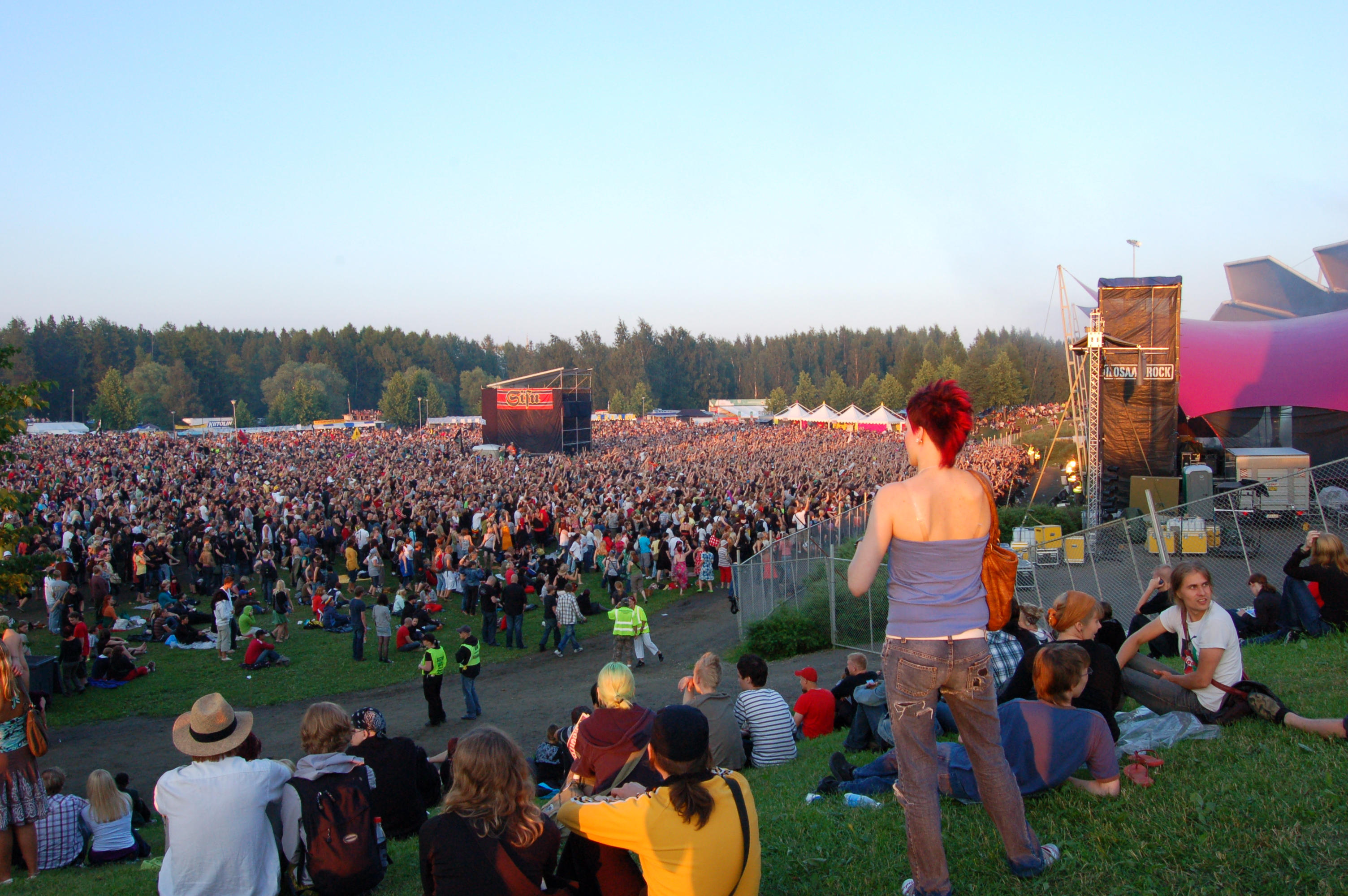
- The main stage of the festival in 2007
- Genre: Heavy metal, punk rock, rock
- Dates: Second full weekend of July
- Locations: Joensuu, Finland
- Years active: 1971 – present
- Founders: Joensuu Pop Musicians' Association
- Website: ilosaarirock.fi/en/

The Ilosaarirock Festival is an annual rock festival held on the second weekend of July in Joensuu, Eastern Finland. Founded in 1971, Ilosaarirock is the second-oldest rock festival in Finland still active, and one of the oldest in Europe. In 2007 the event had 21,000 daily visitors. The festival sold out in advance every year from 1998 to 2011.

Ilosaarirock is an entity of events that in its entirety, with clubs and side-events, spans Friday to Sunday. The actual festival takes place on Saturday and Sunday. The festival site, called Laulurinne, stages performances on five separate stages with over 50 artists. Including all events, Ilosaarirock weekend hosts over 100 artists.

Ilosaarirock is organized mainly by volunteers and is put together by over 1,500 volunteer workers. The Ilosaarirock festival’s graphic look is chosen through an open design contest every year. The Ilosaarirock festival is organised by Joensuu Pop Musicians' Association, which is a non-profit organisation. The profits of the festival are used to support the North Karelian music scene, bands and artists.

== Past dates and headliners ==
- 17–19 July 2026
  - with Alesso, Architects, Sex Pistols featuring Frank Carter, Florence Road, Behm, Emma & Matilda, Gettomasa, Isac Elliot, Kuumaa, Käärijä, Linda Lampenius x Pete Parkkonen, Mayhem, Nylon Beat, Sub Focus, Vesala, Alt Blk Era, Auri, Beast in Black, Bess, Charon, Erika Vikman, Ismo Alanko, Lost Society, Mirella, Olavi Uusivirta, Vilma Jää
- 18–20 July 2025
- 12–14 July 2024
- 14–16 July 2023
- 15–17 July 2022
- 12–14 July 2019
- 13–15 July 2018
- 14–16 July 2017
  - with Imagine Dragons, Pixies
- 15–17 July 2016
  - with The 1975, Volbeat
- 17–19 July 2015
  - with Placebo, Charli XCX, Big K.R.I.T.
- 11–13 July 2014
  - with Ellie Goulding, Portishead
- 12–14 July 2013
  - with Imagine Dragons, Hot Chip
- 13–15 July 2012
  - with 65daysofstatic, Against Me!, Antony and the Johnsons (USA) & Joensuu City Orchestra, Apocalyptica, Black Star, Children of Bodom, D-A-D, First Aid Kit, Goran Bregović & His Wedding and Funeral Orchestra, The Hives, Iiris, Mayhem, Modeselektor, Nasum, Pulled Apart by Horses, Richie Spice, Rival Sons, Tanya Stephens and The xx.
- 15–17 July 2011
  - with Aphex Twin, Blackfield, Buzzcocks, Cody ChesnuTT, The Exploited, Finntroll, Gentleman, Iced Earth, Kate Nash, Kvelertak, Madness, Melt-Banana, Neljä Ruusua, Ojos De Brujo, Red Sparowes and Sielun Veljet.
- 16–18 July 2010
  - with Amorphis, Bad Religion, Biffy Clyro, Boban I Marko Markovic Orkestar, Circle, DevilDriver, DJ Shadow, Faith No More, Ghost Brigade, Insomnium, Imogen Heap, Katatonia, Queen Ifrica, Rise And Fall, Tarot, UNKLE, Ziggi.
- 17–19 July 2009
  - with Apocalyptica, Bad Brains, Beenie Man, Children of Bodom, Damn Seagulls, The Dillinger Escape Plan, Disco Ensemble, Dizzee Rascal, Don Johnson Big Band, Dungen, Everything Is Made in China, Femi Kuti & The Positive Force, The Haunted, Huoratron, Husky Rescue, Isis, Killing Joke, Röyksopp, Stam1na, Stratovarius, Tragedy, Walls of Jericho.
- 11–13 July 2008
  - with Joe Bataan, Comeback Kid, Common, Converge, Cult of Luna, Eläkeläiset, Fanfare Ciocărlia, Heaven Shall Burn, The Heptones, Kashmir, Mad Caddies, Capibara, Mike Patton's Mondo Cane, Mogwai, Nightwish, Oceansize, Ozric Tentacles, Pepe Deluxé, Turisas, Venetian Snares, Von Hertzen Brothers.
- 13–15 July 2007
  - with Anthony B, The Business, Calexico, CunninLynguists, The Cinematic Orchestra, Disco Ensemble, Hidria Spacefolk, HIM, Insomnium, Opeth, Porcupine Tree, RJD2, Sick of It All, The Slackers, Soilwork, Stonegard, Terror, Vavamuffin, Us3.
- 14–16 July 2006
  - with Buju Banton, Blackalicious, Capleton, Carpark North, The Damned, The Darkness, Entombed, The Five Corners Quintet, Katatonia, Kid Koala, Mudhoney, Paprika Korps, Poets of The Fall, Raised Fist, Rotten Sound, Scar Symmetry, Silverbullit, Subs, Saul Williams, Nicole Willis.
- 15–17 July 2005
  - with Agnostic Front, Anthrax, Apocalyptica, Backyard Babies, Children of Bodom, Dark Tranquillity, Disco Ensemble, DKT/MC5, Husky Rescue, Monster Magnet, Phoenix, Kimmo Pohjonen, The Skatalites, Tarakany!, Amon Tobin.
- 16–18 July 2004
  - with The 69 Eyes, Blood for Blood, Auf der Maur, Cradle of Filth, Danko Jones, Gluecifer, Markscheider Kunst, Nasum, Oi Polloi, Promoe, Quintessence, Sentenced, The Soundtrack of Our Lives, Spitfire, Tarot.
- 11–13 July 2003
  - with Bombshell Rocks, Don Johnson Big Band, Guano Apes, The Haunted, The Herbaliser, Moonsorrow, Moonspell, Sonata Arctica, Sonic Youth, Raised Fist, Tequilajazzz, Velcra.
- 12–14 July 2002
  - with 22-Pistepirkko, Deadushki, DJ Krush, Dropkick Murphys, HIM, Looptroop, Machine Head, Muse, Nightwish, Sentenced, Suede.

== See also ==
- Kuopio Rock
- List of historic rock festivals
