= Andrei Knyazev =

Andrei Knyazev is the name of

- Andrei Knyazev (mathematician) (born 1959), Russian-American mathematician
- Andrei Knyazev (footballer) (born 1974), Russian football player
- Andrei Knyazev (musician) (nickname "Knyaz") (born 1973), Russian rock musician, leader of the band Knyazz, ex-leader of the band Korol i Shut
