= Mikhail Gorsheniov =

Russian singer (1973–2013)

Mikhail Gorsheniov Михаил Горшенёв
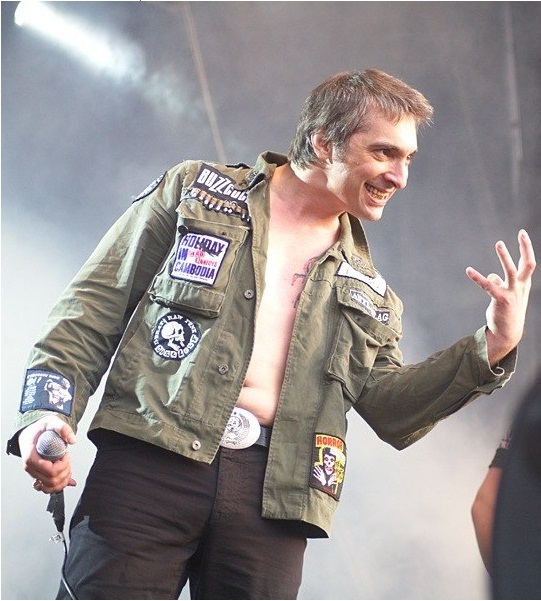
- Mikhail Gorsheniov in June 2011

Background information
- Born: 7 August 1973; Pikalyovo, USSR
- Died: 19 July 2013 (aged 39) Saint Petersburg, Russian Federation
- Genres: horror punk punk rock folk rock hardcore punk hard rock art punk
- Occupations: Musician, singer, composer, theater actor
- Formerly of: Korol i Shut

Mikhail Yurievich "Gorshok" Gorsheniov (Note: Sometimes transcribed to English as Gorshenyov) (Russian: Михаил Юрьевич "Горшок" Горшенёв; 7 August 1973 – 19 July 2013) was a lead singer and composer of Russian horror punk/hard rock band Korol i Shut (The King and the Jester).

== Biography ==
Gorsheniov formed the band in 1988 with his classmates. Soon after that, he invited his friend Andrei Kniazev. Knyazev would become the second singer and the main lyricist. The band's music consisted of various elements of punk rock, hard rock, art rock and gothic rock. Korol i Shut went on to become the number one rock band in Russia. They were the most successful and well-known Russian punk and hard rock act of the decade (2001–2011). The band had many nominations for most every Russian music award and won almost all of them. Mikhail also worked in theater and had a lot of collaborations with other Russian rock musicians.

Mikhail was largely known for his menacing and sinister stage appearance. For a long time he had almost no upper teeth (he lost them by the age of 10). By the beginning of the 21st century he had only two fangs in his upper jaw and it made him look like a vampire or demon. Later Gorsheniov began to use dentures.

Mikhail Gorsheniov was born on 7 August 1973 in the city of Pikalevo, Leningrad Region (however the city of Boksitogorsk is mistakenly considered his place of birth).

=== Early years ===
Due to his father's profession, the family had to move frequently, mostly living in the Far East. When Mikhail was two years old, the younger brother Aleksei was born. As a child, he wanted to follow in the footsteps of his father, he was going to enter a military school, however, when he was 18 years old, during the medical commission at the military registration and enlistment office, he was diagnosed with scoliosis and Mikhail was marked unfit for the service, by the time Mikhail had to go to first grade, the family lived near Khabarovsk. The parents decided to send Mikhail to study in the Leningrad region with his grandmother. Then Yuri Mikhailovich was transferred to work in Leningrad, the family received an apartment on Rzhevka. From the regional school, Mikhail moved to Leningrad. In the lower grades, he was engaged in boxing, and also took guitar lessons, and his teacher came to his house.

=== Music career ===
Together with classmates Alexander Balunov and Alexander Shchigolev, in 1988 he founded the group "Kontora" ("Bureau" in English). In 1990, he invited Andrey Knyazev to the group as a lyricist and second vocalist. Because the lyrics were distinguished by fairy-tale motifs, the group began to be called the "King of Jesters", and later, "The King and the Jester". After school, Mikhail entered the Leningrad Restoration School No. 61, where he studied for three years and was expelled for not studying.

In 2005, Mikhail Gorsheniov's debut solo album, I'm an Alcoholic Anarchist was released, a tribute to the group Brigade, the songs "Life" and "Nightingales" got into the final hundred of the "Chart Dozen" hit parade for 2005. The reason for recording the solo album was a tribute to the "Contract", as well as its then leader Nikolai Mikhailov, whose concerts Mikhail attended in his youth.

The group participated in the Saint Petersburg musical project "Rock Group" together with Andrey Knyazev, Yuri Shevchuk (DDT), Ilya Chert ("Pilot"), Alexander Chernetsky ("Different People") and his younger brother Aleksei Gorsheniov ("Kukryniksy"). In 2006, together with Alexander "Chachya" Ivanov, he took part in the recording of a new version of the song "Punk Rock Lessons" by the Brigade Row group. In 2008, together with Alexander Balunov (a former member of the group), he took part in the recording of the album "Drinking with Jesus" by the Red Elvises, the song "Don't Crucify Me" (written with Igor Yuzov).

In 2010, he became interested in theatrical and staging activities. In the process of work, the idea of creating a theatrical and musical project about a maniac hairdresser, from this idea, Sweeney Todd was born. This is how the musical "TODD" was born, in which all the musicians of the "Korol i Shut" group gradually joined. The result of this was the release of the group's new album, based on the material for the musical: "TODD. Act 1. Feast of Blood", and later "TODD. Act 2. On the Edge".

== Death ==
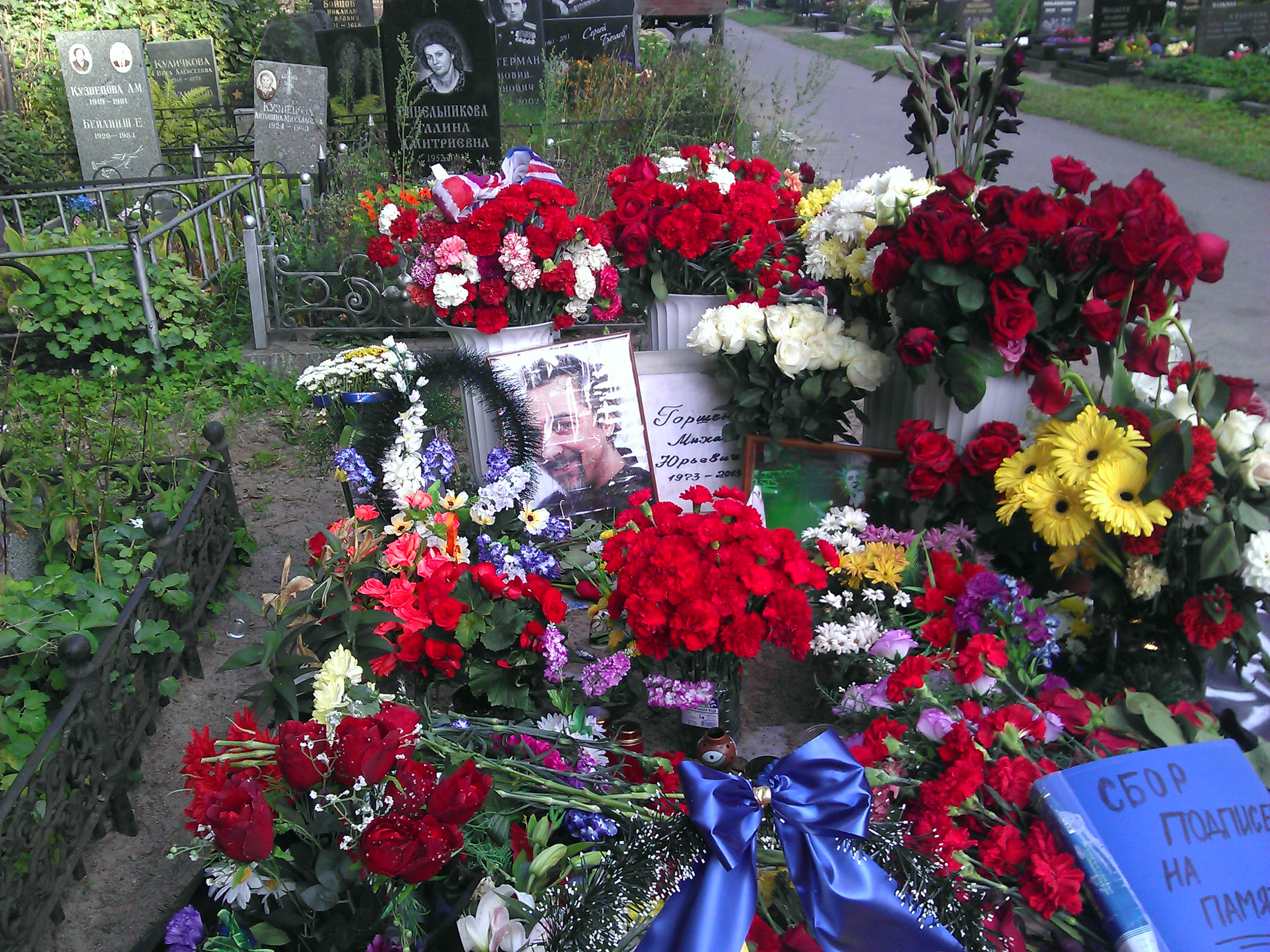
Funeral of Mikhail Gorsheniov

Gorsheniov had admitted to being a longtime drug addict and heroin user. His unsuccessful struggle with his addiction caused his death on 19 July 2013 of heart failure due to alcoholic cardiomyopathy, as one source attributed it to a drug relapse. According to his wishes, he was cremated in Saint Petersburg and his ashes were buried in Bogoslovskoe Cemetery of the city.

A civil memorial service for Mikhail Gorsheniov took place on Monday 22 July at the Yubileiny sports complex in St. Petersburg. According to some reports, from 7 to 10 thousand people came to say goodbye to the musician, including many of his colleagues in the shop. The body was cremated, and the ashes were planned to be scattered, since Gorsheniov was against any burial rites, however, on 1 August the ashes were buried on the main alley of the Theological Cemetery in St. Petersburg.

== Personal life ==
Gorsheniov was married twice and had a daughter Alexandra from his second marriage. He also raised his stepdaughter Anastasia, the daughter of his second wife Olga from first marriage. His younger brother Aleksei is the former frontman of Kukryniksy.

== Discography ==
With Korol i Shut:

Date of Release	Title	Translation
1996	Камнем по голове	Stone to the head
1997	Будь как дома, Путник...	Make yourself at home, Traveler...
1999	Акустический альбом	Acoustic Album
1999	Ели мясо мужики (live)	Men ate meat
2000	Герои и Злодеи	Heroes and Villains
2001	Собрание	Gathering
2001	Как в старой сказке	Like in an Old Tale
2002	Жаль, нет ружья	It's a Shame There's No Gun
2003	Мёртвый анархист (DVD)	A Dead Anarchist
2004	Бунт на корабле	A Mutiny on the Ship
2006	Продавец кошмаров	Trader of Nightmares
2007	Страшные сказки	Scary Tales
2008	Тень клоуна	The Clown's Shadow
2010	Театр демона	The Demon's Theatre
2011	TODD. Акт 1. Праздник крови	TODD. Act 1. A Blood Fest
2012	TODD. Акт 2. На краю	TODD. Act 2. On the edge

Solo albums:

Date of Release	Title	Translation
2005	Я Алкоголик Анархист	I'm an Alcoholic Anarchist
