= Chimera (Russian band) =

Russian underground rock band

Chimera Химера
- Origin: St. Petersburg, Russia
- Genres: Post-hardcore; hardcore punk; post-punk; noise rock; art punk; experimental rock
- Years active: 1990–1997
- Members: Edward Starkov; Gennady Bachinsky; Paul Labutin; Urij Lebedev; Vladislav Viktorov
- Website: deputatbaltiki.narod.ru

Chimera (also known as Deputat Baltiki) was a Russian underground rock band formed by singer/guitarist Edward Starkov and lead-guitarist Gennady Bachinsky in St. Petersburg in 1990. It was the main group of the club Tamtam, in which Korol i Shut and Tequilajazzz also performed. Chimera repeatedly gave concerts in Germany.

In February 1997, at the age of 27, Starkov hanged himself in the attic of Chimera's rehearsal space. The group disbanded after Starkov's death.

== Legacy ==
Chimera's songs have been covered by artists and bands such as Psychea, Pilot, Iva Nova, Zakhar May, and PTVP. Alexei Nikonov of PTVP said: "Chimera is the best thing about Russian rock 'n' roll. I am completely sure: throughout the 1990s in music, only two new words were spoken: in the States there was Nirvana, and in Russia — Chimera".

Chimera's influences include Bauhaus, Nico, Butthole Surfers, Sonic Youth, Fugazi, Daniil Kharms, Jules Verne, Helena Blavatsky, and Philip K. Dick.

== Discography ==
- 1991 Redt Starkov & Co (Russian: Рэдт Старков и компания)
- 1991 Half-Petrograd Acoustics (Полупетроградская акустика)
- 1991 Nautiluses (Кораблики)
- 1991 Stoker Dreams (Сны кочегара)
- 1991 Commissioner of Smoke Gendarmerie (Комиссар дымовой жандармерии)
- 1992 Visionaries (Фантазёры)
- 1993 Chimera (Химера)
- 1994 Electric Train (Электричка)
- 1994 Kalevala (Калевала)
- 1995 Nuihuli
- 1997 It's Me (Это я)
- 1997 ZUDWA

== Members ==
- Edward Starkov ("Redt") - lead singer, acoustic guitar, electric guitar, accordion, wind instrument
- Gennady Bachinsky - guitar, producer
- Urij Lebedev - bass guitar
- Vladislav Viktorov ("Vitus") - drums
- Paul Labutin - cello

== Bibliography ==
- Аксютина О. Панк-вирус в России. Леан, 1999. — 320 с. — ISBN 5-85929-063-2
- Бурлака А. Рок-энциклопедия. Популярная музыка в Ленинграде-Петербурге. 1965—2005. Том 3. — М.: Амфора, 2007. — С. 433—477.
- Никонов А. Нулевые. С-Пб.: Карма Мира/ШSS, 2009. — 186 с.
