= Zontov =

Zontov or Zontow (Russian: Зонтов from зонт, meaning umbrella) is a Russian surname. Its feminine counterpart is Zontova or Zontowa. It may refer to

- Grigori Zontov (born 1972), singer of the Russian band Spitfire
- Lidiya Zontova (born 1936), Russian rower
