= Soviet locomotive class shch-el-1 =

shch-el-1 or Щэл1
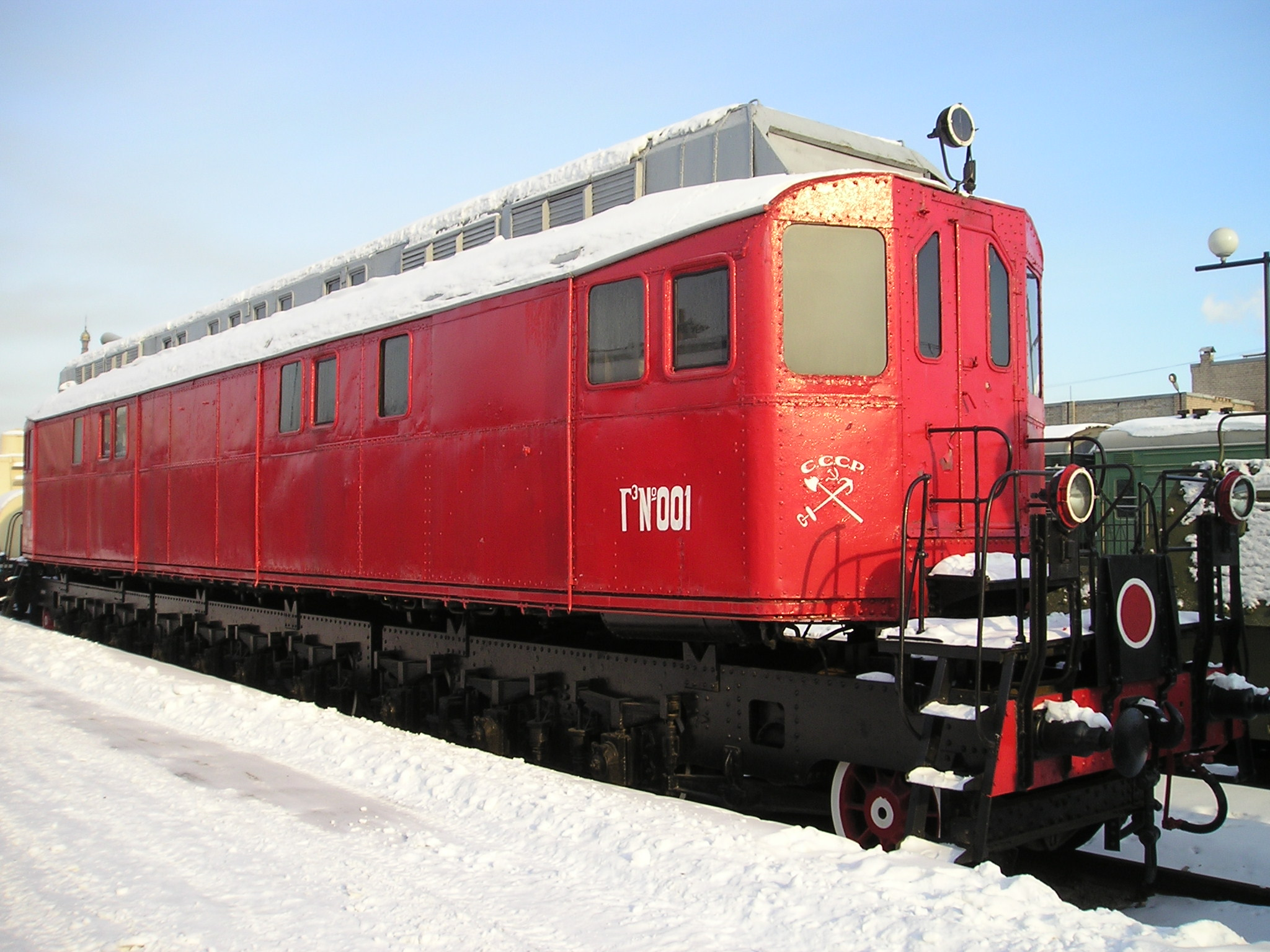
- Diesel-electric locomotive class shch-el-1 preserved in Saint Petersburg
Type and origin
- Power type: Diesel-electric
- Builder: Putilov Plant and Baltic Shipyard; Designer: Yakov Gakkel
- Build date: 1924
Specifications
- Configuration
  - UIC: (1Co)+Do+(Co1)
  - Commonwealth: 1Co+Do+Co1
- Prime mover: Vickers 10 cylinder
- Transmission: Diesel-electric
Performance figures
- Power output: 1,030 hp (770 kW) (diesel)
Career
- Number in class: 1
- Retired: 1927
- Disposition: Preserved

The shch-el-1 (Cyrillic script: Щэл1) was the Soviet Union's first diesel locomotive. It was designed by Yakov Modestovich Gakkel and built by the Putilov Plant and the Baltic Shipyard in Petrograd (St. Petersburg, Russia). It was completed in 1924 and named "The Lenin Memorial Diesel Locomotive".

== Powertrain ==
The prime mover was a Vickers 10 cylinder diesel engine. According to Westwood, this was "presumably salvaged from a British submarine lost in the Baltic in 1919". The electric generators were also of submarine type but were made in Italy. Details of the traction motors are unknown.

== Service ==
After trials, the locomotive worked on the Moscow-Kursk line but spent a lot of time out of service. It was withdrawn in 1927 after covering 25,000 mi (40,000 km), and was then put to work as a mobile generator.

== Preservation ==
The locomotive is preserved at the Russian Railway Museum in Saint Petersburg.
