= Andrei Knyazev (musician) =

Russian singer (born 1973)

Andrei Knyazev Андре́й Серге́евич Кня́зев
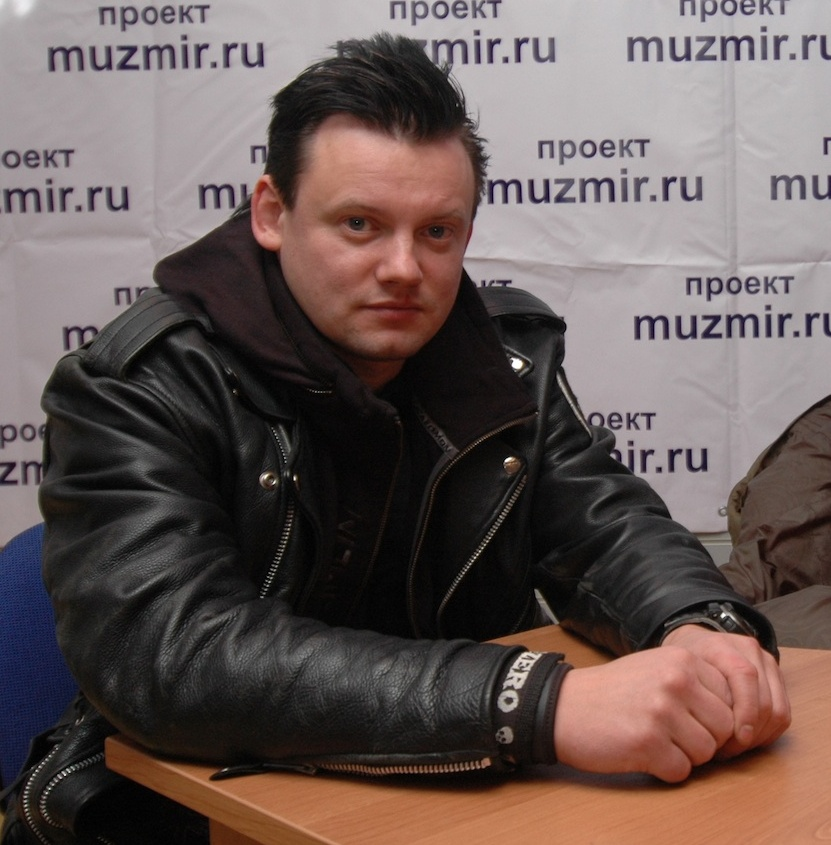
- Knyazev in 2007

Background information
- Also known as: Knyaz
- Born: Andrei Sergeevich Knyazev; February 6, 1973 (age 53); Leningrad
- Origin: Soviet Union
- Genres: Punk rock, horror punk, folk punk, hardcore punk, art punk, spoken word
- Instruments: Vocal, guitar
- Years active: 1988-present
- Website: knyazz.ru

Andrei Sergeevich "Knyaz" Knyazev (Russian: Андре́й Серге́евич Кня́зев) is a Russian rock musician, songwriter and singer who is the leader of the Saint Petersburg band Knyazz. From 1989 to 2011, he was the second vocalist and primary songwriter of the band Korol i Shut.

== Discography ==
With Korol i Shut:

Date of Release	Title	Translation
1996	Камнем по голове	Stone to the Head
1997	Король и Шут	King and Jester
1999	Акустический альбом	Acoustic Album
1999	Ели мясо мужики (live)	Men Were Eating Meat
2000	Герои и злодеи	Heroes and Villains
2001	Собрание	Gathering
2001	Как в старой сказке	Like in an Old Tale
2002	Жаль, нет ружья!	Alas, I Have No Rifle!
2003	Мёртвый анархист (DVD)	Dead Anarchist
2004	Бунт на корабле	Mutiny on the Ship
2006	Продавец кошмаров	Trader of Nightmares
2007	Страшные Сказки	Scary Tales
2008	Тень Клоуна	The Clown's Shadow
2010	Театр демона	Demon's Theatre

Solo albums:

2005 – Scoundrel's Love ("Любовь негодяя")

With Knyazz:

Date of Release	Title	Translation
2011	Письмо из Трансильвании	A letter from Transylvania
2012	Тайна кривых зеркал	The secret of crooked mirrors
2013	Роковой карнавал	The fatal carnival
2014	Магия Калиостро	Cagliostro's magic
2015	Предвестник	Precursor
2020	Домашний альбом	Home’s album

== See also ==
- Mikhail Gorsheniov
