= Teatr Demona =

Studio album by Korol i Shut
- Released: 11 October 2010
- Recorded: 8 May – 13 September 2010
- Genre: Art rock, art punk, folk punk
- Length: 45:28
- Label: Nikitin

Korol i Shut chronology
Ten' Klouna (2008)	Teatr Demona (2010)	TODD. Act 1. Prazdnik Krovi (2011)

Teatr Demona (Russian: Теа́тр Де́мона, lit. Demon's Theatre) is the tenth studio album by Russian punk-rock band "Korol i Shut", released in 2010. It was their last album featuring the band's long-time main lyric writer, second vocalist and founding member Andrei Knyazev, who left the band in 2011. The entire album was recorded with acoustic instruments only, in the unusual (for the band) genre of art punk.

== Track listing ==
No.	Title	English translation	Length
1.	"Poslanie" (Russian: Послание)	A Message	1:57
2.	"Teatralniy Demon" (Russian: Театральный Демон)	The Theatre's Demon	3:33
3.	"Kinogeroy" (Russian: Киногерой)	A Movie Hero	3:35
4.	"Fokusnik" (Russian: Фокусник)	An Illusionist	3:32
5.	"Tanets Zlobnogo Geniya" (Russian: Танец Злобного Гения)	A Dance of the Evil Genius	3:55
6.	"Endi Kaufman" (Russian: Энди Кауфман)	Andy Kaufman	2:32
7.	"Madam Zhorzhett" (Russian: Мадам Жоржетт)	Madam Georgette	6:07
8.	"Buntar" (Russian: Бунтарь)	A Rebel	4:13
9.	"Tyomniy Uchitel" (Russian: Тёмный Учитель)	The Dark Teacher	4:35
10.	"Korol Vechnogo Sna" (Russian: Король Вечного Сна)	The King of the Eternal Sleep	5:02
11.	"Bal Litsemerov" (Russian: Бал Лицемеров)	A Party of Hypocrites	3:06
12.	"Zaschitniki" (Russian: Защитники)	Protectors	3:21

Songwriters:
Music by M. Gorsheniov (1, 2, 4, 5, 7, 9, 10, 12) and A. Knyazev (3, 6, 8, 11).
Lyrics by A. Knyazev (1 — 9, 11) and M. Gorsheniov (7, 10, 12).
