= Korol i Shut (album) =

King and Jester

Studio album by Korol i Shut
- Released: 1996
- Genre: Folk punk Punk rock
- Length: 48:52
- Label: Melodiya

Korol i Shut chronology
| Kamnem po golove (1996) | King and Jester (1996) | Akusticheskii Albom (1999) |

Korol i Shut (King and Jester, Russian: Король и Шут) is the second album of the Russian rock group Korol i Shut. It was released in 1996. This album is a re-recording of a non-official 1994 release «Make Yourself At Home, Wayfarer». In 2000, the album was re-issued again under its original name.

== Track listing ==
1. Korol i Shut (The King and the Jester, Russian: Король и Шут) — 2:41
2. Dva Druga (Two Friends, Russian: Два Друга) — 2:14
3. Sapogi Mertvetsa (Dead Man's Boots, Russian: Сапоги Мертвеца) — 2:29
4. Okhotnik (The Hunter, Russian: Охотник) — 2:35
5. Panika v Sele (Panic in the Village, Russian: Паника в Селе) — 3:16
6. Istinny Ubiytsa (True Killer, Russian: Истинный Убийца) — 2:02
7. Lesnik (Forester, Russian: Лесник) — 3:11
8. Pomogi Mne! (Help Me! Russian: Помоги Мне!) — 2:26
9. Istorya o Myortvoy Zhenshchine (Story about a Dead Woman, Russian: История о Мертвой Женщине) — 3:43
10. Kukolny Teatr (Puppet Theater, Russian: Кукольный Театр) — 2:52
11. Valet i Dama (The Jack and the Queen, Russian: Валет и Дама) — 3:31
12. Vesyolye Trolli (The Jolly Trolls, Russian: Веселые Тролли) — 3:32
13. Vyacheslav (Vyacheslav, Russian: Вячеслав) — 2:17
14. Otets i Maski (The Father and the Masks, Russian: Отец и Маски) — 3:03
15. Skazka pro Drakona (The Tale of a Dragon, Russian: Сказка про Дракона) — 2:53
16. Instrument (Instrument, Russian: Инструмент) — 2:04
17. Sobraniye (The Gathering, Russian: Собрание) — 4:03
