= Yakov Modestovich Gakkel =

Russian scientist and engineer

- Яков Модестович Гаккель
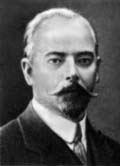
- Born: 30 April 1874; Irkutsk, Russian Empire
- Died: 12 December 1945 (aged 71); Leningrad, Russian SFSR, Soviet Union
- Known for: Aircraft and locomotive design
- Children: Yakov Gakkel

Yakov Modestovich Gakkel (Russian: Яков Модестович Гаккель; 30 April 1874 – 12 December 1945) was a Russian and Soviet scientist and engineer who made significant contributions to the development of aircraft and locomotives in the Russian Empire and Soviet Union.

== Biography ==
His father was a military engineer and he attended the Petersburg Electrotechnical Institute. In 1896, he was arrested for revolutionary activities and imprisoned for several months. After being released, he was allowed to graduate, then exiled to Siberia. He was sent to work at The Lena Goldfields (later the site of the infamous Lena massacre), near Bodaybo. While there, he participated in the construction of hydroelectric facilities and helped wire the goldfields with one of Russia's first high-voltage power lines.

When he returned from exile in 1903, he became a teacher at the Institute and was involved in the construction of the Saint Petersburg Tramway. Six years later, he received an award from the Westinghouse Electric company that allowed him to begin developing his first airplane, the Gakkel-I. That same year, he was one of the founders of Russia's first airplane construction company, the "Pоссии авиастроительное предприятие С.С. Щетинин" (S.S. Shchetinin Russian Association of Aeronautics), named after one of its major backers.

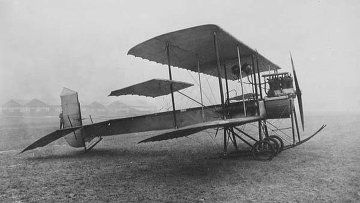
The Gakkel-VII

On 24 May 1910, the Gakkel-III made a 200-meter (656 ft) flight; the first by an airplane of entirely Russian design and construction. In 1911, the Gakkel-VII made a round-trip flight between Saint Petersburg and Tsarskoye Selo at an average speed of 92 km/h (57 mph) and set a height record of 1,250 m (4,101 ft).

Through 1924, he designed over a dozen airplanes, ten of which were built and six of which were able to fly. Although he pioneered some types of designs (including an amphibious aircraft, the Gakkel-V, which never flew) and set several records, none of his airplanes were mass-produced due to poor performance at crucial moments. In 1912, two of his prototypes (the Gakkel-VIII and Gakkel-IX) were destroyed by a mysterious fire. After that, he withdrew from active participation in the work of the Association. In 1938, he expressed his regrets at having done so in a letter to the pilot and Soviet hero, Mikhail Vodopyanov. Many years later, it was rumored that agents from the Dux Factory had bribed his mechanics to sabotage his engines during competitions for military contracts by pouring sulfuric acid into them.

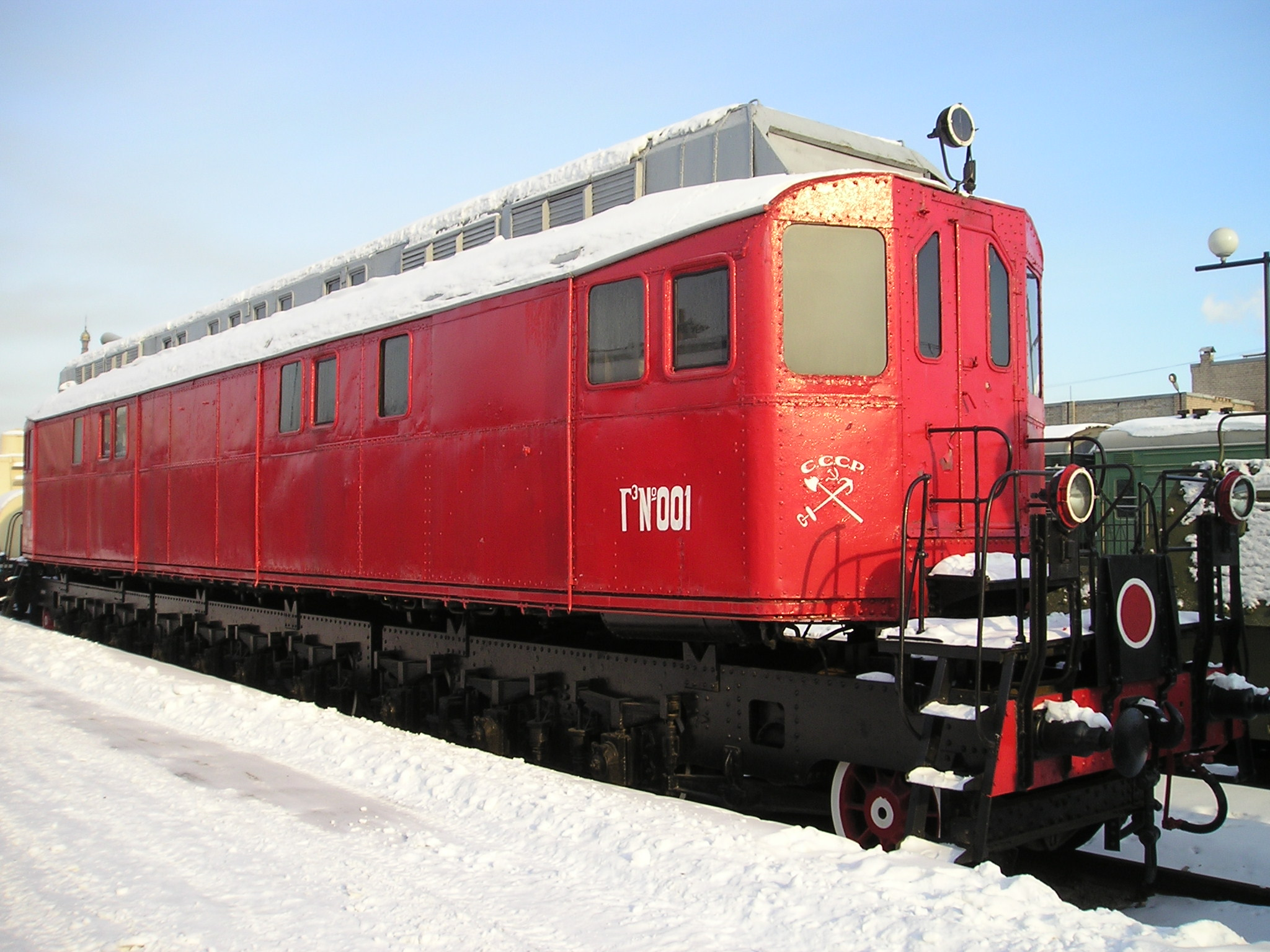
The Щэл1 diesel locomotive

During World War I, he helped design lightweight batteries for submarines. In the late 1920s, after a final attempt to involve the government in producing his aircraft, his interests turned to locomotive design. In August 1924, working in conjunction with the Baltic Shipyard and the Putilov Plant, he designed the first Russian-made diesel locomotive, the Щэл1. (The Ээл2, a slightly earlier model designed by Yury Lomonosov, was made in Germany).

In 1934, he designed steam tractors and steam devices for riverboats. After 1936, he was a teacher at the Leningrad Institute of Railway Engineers. In 1940, he was awarded the Order of the Red Banner of Labour. Hardships suffered during the German blockade seriously damaged his health and he died in 1945.

His son, Yakov, was a prominent oceanographer. His daughter Ekaterina (1903-1984) followed him into the field of locomotive engineering and became one of the first women in Russia to be named to a technology-related professorship.
