= Yakov Gakkel =

Russian oceanographer

Yakov Yakovlevich Gakkel (Russian: Яков Яковлевич Гаккель; July 18, 1901, in Saint Petersburg – December 30, 1965, in Leningrad) was a Soviet and Russian oceanographer, doctor of geographical sciences (1950), professor, director of the geography department of the Arctic and Antarctic Research Institute, son of scientist Yakov Modestovich Gakkel.

Yakov Gakkel participated in numerous Arctic expeditions, including the ones on the icebreaker Sibiryakov (1932) and the steamship Chelyuskin (1934). He was the first one to create a bathymetric map of the Arctic basin.

Yakov Gakkel was awarded two orders and several medals during his scientific career. In 1966, one of the mid-oceanic ridges was named after him.
