= Gennady Bachinsky =

Russian radio talk show host and producer (1971–2008)

Gennady Nikolaevich Bachinsky/Bachynsky (Russian: Генна́дий Никола́евич Бачи́нский; 1 September 1971 – 12 January 2008) was a Russian TV and radio host and producer who usually collaborated with Sergei Stillavin (Сергей Стиллавин).

== Early life ==
He was born on September 1, 1971, in the town of Yarovoe/Yarovoye in the Altai region/territory.

When he was a child, he wanted to become a clown.

In 1994, he graduated from Санкт-Петербургский Государственный Электротехнический Университет, specializing in Автоматика и процессы управления в технических системах (systems engineering).

He was Orthodox, and decided to get baptized during his years as a student. He was a member of the Komsomol.

== Career ==
While studying at the university Санкт-Петербургский Государственный Электротехнический Университет, he organized his first music group.

In St. Petersberg, he worked for the Полис (June 1992 to 1994), Катюша, and Модерн (1995 to 2001) radio stations, was a producer for young rock bands, and wrote about music for various magazines.

From 1994 to 1997, he hosted music programs on радио Модерн.

He co-hosted many radio shows in St. Petersburg with Sergei Stillavin in the 1990s (starting in 1997), then moved to Moscow in 2001. He also hosted television shows. He and Stillavin hosted the morning talk show Two in One (Шоу 2в1 / Утреннего шоу Бачинского и Стиллавина), known for its jokes about sex, and were dubbed the "Howard Sterns of Russian Radio". It took place from 7 to 11 am on weekdays. They came up with it in 1997 and initially hosted it on Russkoye Radio from September to December 2001. On February 18, 2002, they it moved to Radio Maximum and broadcast it there for about 5 years. In June 2005, the show got about 52,000 listeners. He quit Maximum on June 29, 2007, due to conflict with its management, moving the show to state radio station Mayak and making the content tamer. He and Stillavin authored a book titled Кривой эфир about the show.

He was an anchorman for TV programs such as ТНТ, MTV, and Первом канале.

Since October 2007, he worked on the TV show Стенка на стенку.

Since July 2007, he was chief producer for ВГТРК.

In April 2007, he got the Best Morning Show (Лучшее утреннее шоу) national award from Radiomania (Радиомания).

Alongside Stillavin, he participated in the Russian dubbings of the 2005 film Robots and the 1996 film 101 Dalmatians, as well as voice-acting for the videogames Кофе-брейк. Перцы в офисе published by Play Ten Interactive, Адреналин. Экстрим шоу published by 1С and Gaijin Entertainment, Destroy All Humans published by Pandemic Studios and translated by Vellod Impex, and Rat Hunter developed by Secret Sign and published by Russobit-M and Game Factory Interactive Ltd..

== Death ==
On Saturday January 12, 2008, on his way to a party, he was driving a Volkswagen Golf on the 69th kilometer of the Kalyazin-Sergiyev Posad (Калязин - Сергиев Посад) highway, in the Tver region, near Савихино. At 3:40 am or PM Moscow time he tried to pass a truck while driving up a mountain in wet and foggy weather, and approached a Volkswagen Transporter minivan/minibus head-on; both were going about 100 km/h (about 60 mph); both tried to swerve to avoid each other, but they nevertheless collided. The airbags and seatbelt worked, but he died instantly from injuries to his head, bones, and internal organs. Passers-by called for an ambulance, which arrived within 3 minutes.

The collision was at an angle, impacting the front left side of his car. Before the accident, his car was in good working order, except for possibly a broken wheel, which required additional forensic analysis. The truck that he tried to pass did not remain at the scene, and therefore was the target of suspicion for potentially being at fault in the accident.

Two female passengers in his car had non-life-threatening injuries. Three people in the minibus were injured. The 33-year old driver of the minivan/minibus was brought to the Kalyazinsky hospital and discharged with a concussion, then returned home to Kesova Gora and will get long-term treatment. An injured passenger on the minibus named Yuliya Merkulova who was the mother of two children went to Tver regional hospital and died on Tuesday January 22, 2008, due to a pulmonary embolism the previous day, and a 50-year-old passenger fractured her hip and both forearms and went to hospital Кесовогорскую ЦРБ, for surgery beginning on Wednesday January 23, 2008. Two 30-year-old passengers on the minibus were taken to the Kalyazinsky hospital: one had a dislocated left hip, fractured right hip, and eye and face burns caused by battery vapor leakage, and the other had multiple leg fractures.

His car and the minibus were sent for examination. The Russian Federation's prosecutor's office opened a criminal case under the criminal code, Article 264 "Violation of the Rules for Traffic Safety and Operation of Transport Vehicles", Part 2 ("which has involved by negligence the death of a person").

On Sunday January 13, 2008, his widow and other relatives, as well as Sergei Stillavin, with whom he co-hosted talk shows for about 10 years, attended a memorial service for him at the Nikolo-Klobukovsky/Kablukovsky Monastery near the town of Kashin.

As of Monday January 14, 2008, about 170,000 condolence notes were posted on the website of state radio station Mayak, where his most recent talk show was hosted. During his normal timeslot that day, parts of his previous episodes were re-aired, and journalists took calls from listeners live.

On Tuesday January 15, 2008, he had a funeral at the Central House of Journalists in Moscow from 10 am to noon, then was buried in Troyekurovskoye Cemetery, also in Moscow.

As of his death, his wife Yuliya (b. 5 December 1976) and two daughters, Katya (b. 28 November 1997) and Liza (b. 29 October 2007) were still alive.
