= Poslednie Tanki V Parizhe =

Russian punk rock band

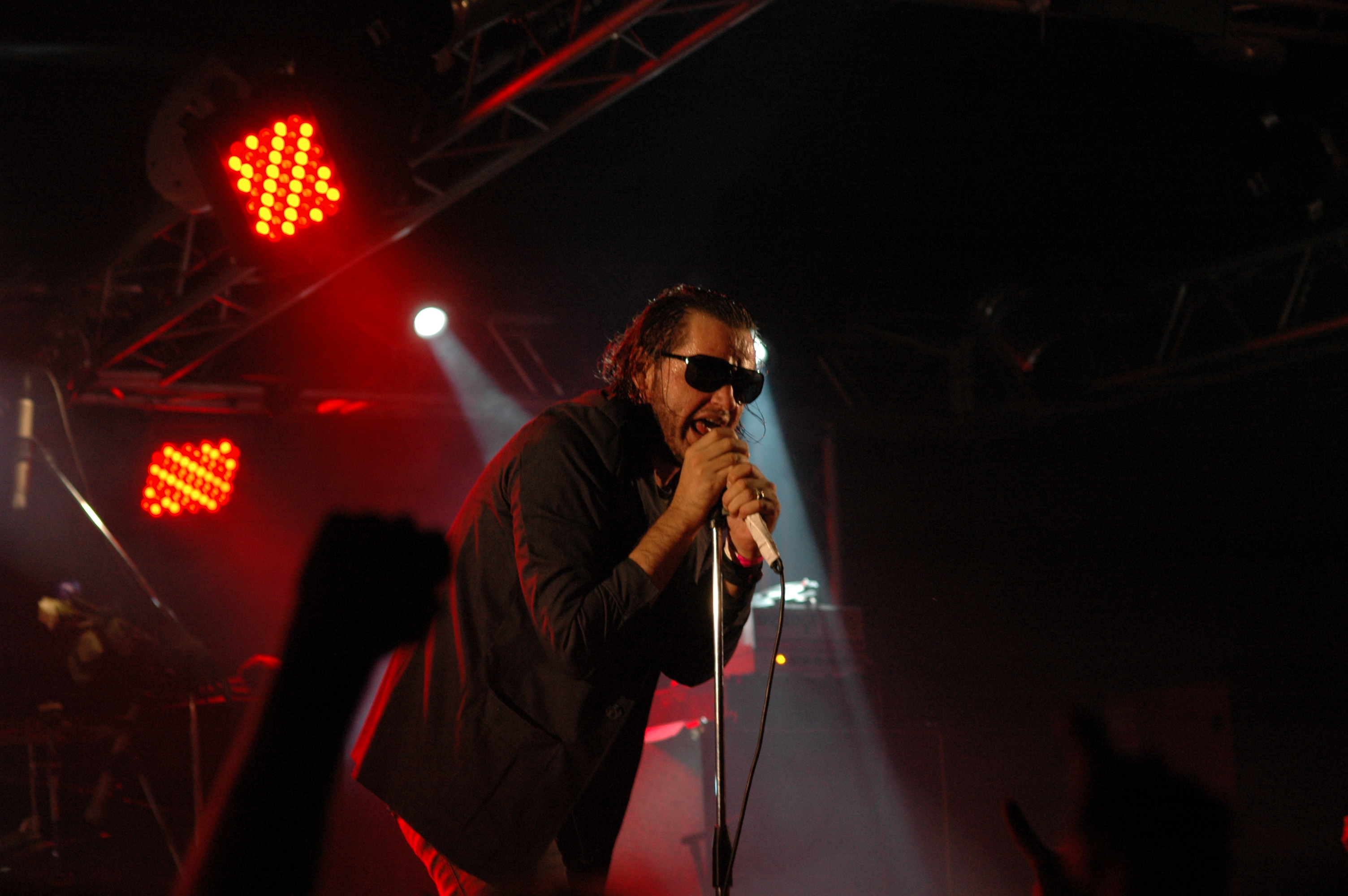
PTVP Zal Ozhidaniya

Poslednie Tanki V Parizhe (Последние танки в Париже; abbreviated П.Т.В.П., PTVP, or PTWP) is a Russian punk rock band from Saint-Petersburg. The band's name translates as The Last Tankas in Paris.

The group was founded in 1996 and has released ten full-length albums in Russia. It was formed by drummer Edward Starkov and vocalist Alexei Nikonov. The group has intimated that their latest (at the time) album, 2008's Zerkalo, will be the last they release on CD, believing it to be a dying medium. They are noted for their strong views against authoritarianism in Russian politics, and have repeatedly denounced the actions of Vladimir Putin in their lyrics. At the time the group first formed, it was one of comparatively few political rock bands in Russia, many of the anti-communist bands of the 1980s having broken up or moved into mainstream music after the dissolution of the Soviet Union. However, over the course of the 2000s, PTVP has become one of several well-known bands with outspoken political viewpoints in Russian rock music.

== Members ==
- Alexei Nikonov - vocals, guitar
- Arthur Martur - guitar
- Iegor Nedviga - bass guitar, backing vocals
- Denis Antonov - drums, samples

== Past members ==
- Nikolai Benikhaev – guitar (1996 - 1998)
- Grigori Ukhov – bass guitar, accordion, trumpet, percussion (1996 - 1997)
- Edward "Redt" Starkov – drums, other instruments (1996 - 1997)
- Sergey "Vel'mita" Vel'miskin – drums (1997 - 2001)
- Maksim Kiselyov – guitar, backing vocals (1999 - 2003)
- Dmitry Chirkov – guitar (2004 - 2006)
- Anton "Bender" Dokuchaev – guitar (2006 - 2022)
- Dmitry Malinkin – guitar (2022 - 2024)

== Discography ==
Studio albums

- 1998 — Девственность (Virginity)
- 1999 — Порномания (Pornomania)
- 2001 — Гексаген (Hexagene)
- 2004 — 2084
- 2007 — Свобода слова (Freedom of Speech)
- 2008 — Зеркало (The Mirror)
- 2010 — Порядок вещей (The Order of Things)
- 2012 — Ультиматум (The Ultimatum)
- 2014 — Ключи от всех дверей (The Skeleton Key)
- 2016 — Реакция (Reaction)

Singles, EPs, Demos

- 1996: Olkaa Hyvä (Finnish "You are Welcome") [single]
- 1996: Собаки в глазах (Dogs in your Eyes) [single]
- 1998: Кировский / Дачный / Ласковый Муй Акустика (Kirovsky / Dachny (Suburban) / My Tender Acoustics)
- 1999: Порномания 99 (Pornomania 99)
- 2001: Враньёмиксы (Lies Mix)
- 2001: Гексаген (Переиздание’04) (Hexagene, Reissued '04)
- 2002: Девствительность (Untranslatable portmanteau word, fusion of Reality and Virginity) [Live album]
- 2002: Может быть Хуже (Might be worse) [Live in Moloko 10-07-2002]
- 2003: Кровь и Сперма (Blood and Sperm) [Live in Oplandina 2003]
- 2004: Евростандарт (Eurostandard) [single]
- 2005: 2085
- 2005: Свобода cлова (Freedom of Speech) [Demo]
- 2006: Ремиксы (Remixes) [internet project]
- 2006: Ремиксы vol. 2 (Remixes vol. 2) [internet project]
- 2006: Зелёные поезда (Акустика, Live in Вологда 20-05-2006) (Green Trains (Acoustic, Live in Vologda)) [Live album]
- 2006: Техника Быстрой Записи (The Technique of Speedy Recording)
- 2007: Обычный день (An Ordinary Day) [Media EP]
- 2009: Репортаж с петлёй на шее (Reportage with a noose on the neck) (Chimera cover) [EP]
- 2009: Ремиксы (Remixes)
- 2012: Л.Н. и Grapefruit! — Стихи и немного шума (L.N. and Grapefruit! - poetry and some noise) [bootleg]
- 2012: ПТВП piano cover (LTIP piano cover)
- 2018: Последние слова (Last words) [single]
- 2018: Такси (Taxi) [single]
- 2019: Смотри на Арлекина (Look at the Harlequin) [single]
- 2019: Руки иллюзий (Hands of illusion) [EP]
- 2024: Не оставляя следов (Without leaving trace)
- 2024: Давай закроем эту дверь! (Let's shut this door!) [SP]

DVD

- 2007: Права человека (Live in Oplandina 02-05-2006) (Human Rights)
