= Korol i Shut =

Russian punk rock band

Background information
- Origin: Saint Petersburg, Russia
- Genres: Horror punk, folk punk, shock rock, art punk
- Years active: 1988–2014
- Labels: Misteriya Zvuka (Russian: Мистерия Звука); Melodiya (Russian: Мелодия); Manchester Files; Nikitin (Russian: Никитин)
- Past members: Mikhail Gorsheniov; Andrei Kniazev; Aleksandr Balunov; Dmitrii Riabchenko; Aleksei Gorsheniov; Maria Nefiodova; Dmitrii Rishko; Yakov Tsvirkunov; Aleksandr Shchigoliev; Pavel Sazhinov; Aleksandr Leontiev; Sergei Zaharov
- Website: www.korol-i-shut.ru

Korol i Shut (Russian: Король и Шут, lit. 'King and Jester') were a Russian horror punk band from Saint Petersburg that took inspiration and costumes from tales and fables.

== History ==
The band was formed in 1988 by a group of school friends in Leningrad (current-day Saint Petersburg). The founding members were Mikhail "Gorshok" Gorsheniov (Russian: Михаил "Горшок" Горшенёв), Aleksandr "Balu" Balunov (Russian: Александр "Балу" Балунов), and Aleksandr "Lieutenant" Shchigoliev (Russian: Александр "Поручик" Щиголев). Singer Andrei "Kniaz" Kniazev (Russian: Андрей "Князь" Князев) joined the band in 1990 and guitarist Yakov Tsvirkunov (Russian: Яков Цвиркунов) joined in 1996. The band's name, which means "The King and the Jester," was adopted in 1992. Previously, the band was called Kontora (Russian: Контора, lit. 'Bureau'). The band came up with their final name, "Korol' i Shut" in 1990. Before that, they tried a variety of other options, including "Armageddon," "The Apocalypse," and "The King of Jesters," which served as a transition to their final name.

Korol' i Shut's lyrics are written by Kniazev and feature horror stories and folk tales about pirates, trolls, ghosts and vampires, as well as Slavic mythology.

The band recorded their music for the first time in 1991 in a semi-professional studio. Their music was broadcast on the radio soon after and they began to tour around Saint Petersburg's clubs. They began rehearsing in the club TaMtAm, in which the bands Chimera and Tequilajazzz also started performing.

In 1994, the band released a few copies of a tape named "Bud' kak doma putnik" (Russian: «Будь как дома путник», lit. 'Make Yourself At Home, Wayfarer').

The band's first official album was 1996's "Kamnem po golove" (Russian: «Камнем по голове», lit. 'Rock To The Head') which was distributed by Melodiya. Many other albums were released since then. The first music video was released in 1998 for the song "Yeli miaso muzhiki" (Russian: «Ели мясо мужики», lit. 'Men Were Eating Meat').

== Rise in fame (1996–2000) ==
In 1997, the band was featured on Saint Petersburg's television in a show called "Belaya Polosa" (White Line), where they premiered four music videos for songs "Durak i Molniya" ( A Fool and the Lightning), "Vnezapnaya Golova" (A Sudden Head), "Sadovnik"(The Gradener), and "Blujdayut Teni" (Wandering Shadows).

The band released their self-titled sophomore album "Korol' i Shut" on February 1, 1998. The album mostly consisted of old songs remade in an advanced sound-recording studio.

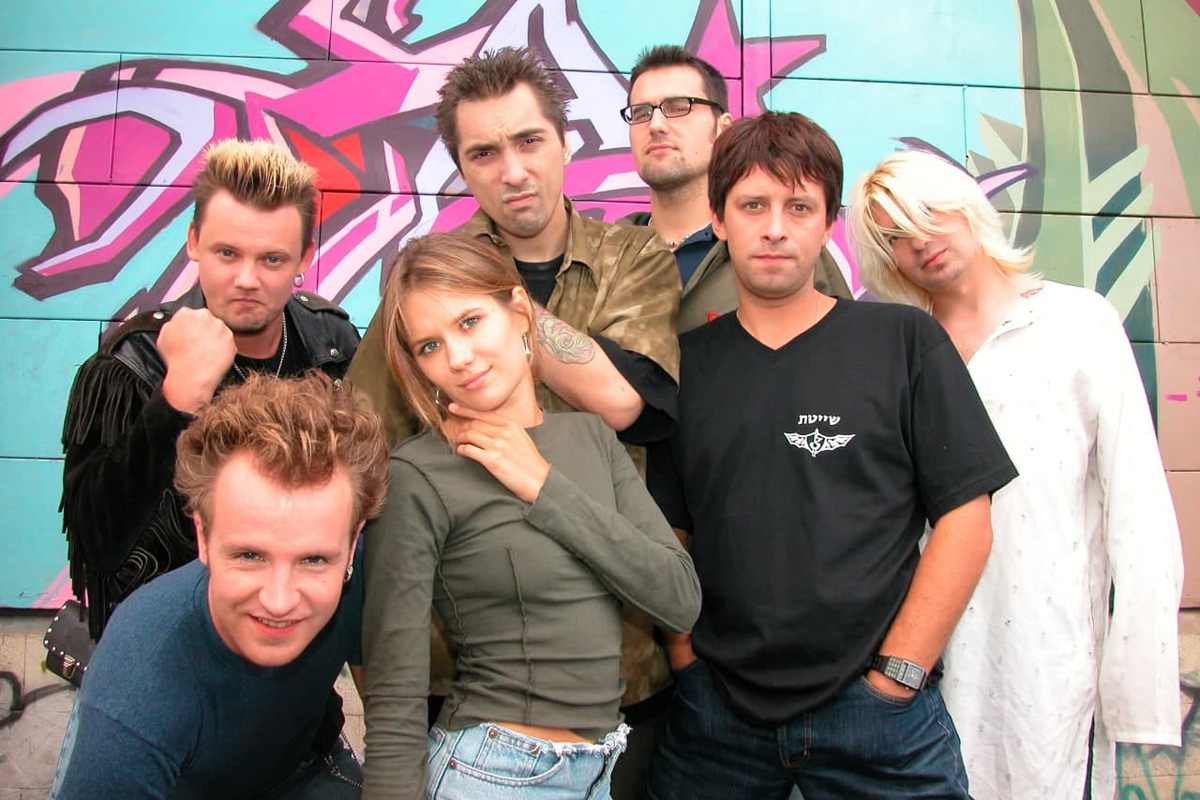
Korol' i Shut

The band's third album "Akusticheskiy Albom," (The Acoustic Album) was released in March 1999. The album featured multiple hit songs, including "Kukla Kolduna" (A Sorcerer's Doll) and the chart-breaking "Prignu so skali" (I’ll Jump off a Cliff).

== Peak of fame (2001–2003) ==
In 2002, Korol' i Shut performed abroad for the first time in their career, in Tel Aviv, Israel. They followed up the performance with a tour of the United States, Israel, and Finland in 2003.

On August 11, 2002, the band headlined the "Nashestvie" (Invasion) festival and performed in front of more than 200,000 people.

In June 2003, the band took part in decorating a new Rock and roll club "Staryi Dom" (The Old House) in Saint Petersburg. The walls of the VIP section were painted by Andrey Knyazev.Until the club closed in 2005, Korol' i Shut occasionally rehearsed and performed in it.

== Gorshok's death ==
On July 19, 2013, Mikhail "Gorshok" Gorsheniov was found dead in his Saint Petersburg home. The cause of death was announced to be heart failure, linked to alcohol and morphine abuse. After a farewell tour during the fall and winter of 2013, Korol' i Shut officially broke up in January 2014. The surviving members formed a new band named Severny Flot (Russian: Северный флот).

However, due to the numerous requests of the fans, the former band members decided to keep the name Korol' i Shut exclusively for the release of the unfinished rock musical TODD.

== Knyazev's departure and TODD (2011–2013) ==
In 2011, the band began work on a rock opera titled "TODD" about Sweeney Todd, a fictional serial killer barber, in which Gorsheniov was supposed to play the main role.Andrey Knyazev refused to participate in the project, shortly departing from the band, and forming his own band "KnyaZZ." When asked about the reasons for his departure, Knyazev stated that he did not share Gorsheniov's vision for the band's future, branching into theater.

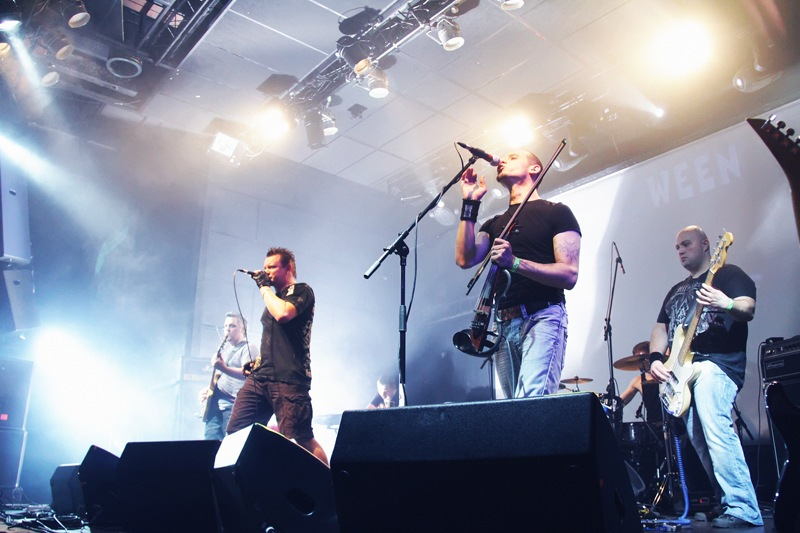
"KnyaZZ"

=== Posthumous recognition ===
In 2023, a TV miniseries Korol i Shut was released, that combinines the band's biography with adaptations of folk horror stories.

== Legacy ==
A monument to Mikhail Gorshenev has been placed in Voronezh and opened on November 9, 2014. A sign on the monument said "I am alive as long as I believe in miracles." In 2016 the monument was broken by unknown perpetrators and repaired shortly after.

== Former members ==
- Mikhail "Gorshok" Gorshenyov (Михаил «Горшок» Горшенёв) - vocals, acoustic guitar (1988-2013, died 2013)
- Andrei "Kniaz" Kniazev (Андрей «Князь» Князев) - vocals, lyrics (1989-2011)
- Aleksandr "Balu" Balunov (Александр «Балу» Балунов) — bass guitar, guitar (1988-2006)
- Dmitry "Ryabchik" Ryabchenko (Дмитрий «Рябчик» Рябченко) — bass guitar
- Aleksei "Yagoda" Gorshenyov (Алексей «Ягода» Горшенёв) — drums (1993-1995)
- Maria "Masha" Nefyodova (Мария «Маша» Нефёдова) — violin (1998-2004)
- Dmitry "Casper" Rishko (Дмитрий Ришко) - violin (2006-2011)
- Yakov "Yasha" Tsvirkunov (Яков «Яша» Цвиркунов) - guitars, backing vocal (1995-2013)
- Aleksandr "Poruchik" Shchigolyev (Александр «Поручик» Щиголев) - drums (1988-2013)
- Pavel "Pakhan" Sazhinov (Павел Сажинов) - keyboards (1998-2013)
- Aleksandr "Renegat" Leontyev (Александр «Ренегат» Леонтьев) — guitar (2001-2006; 2011-2013)
- Sergei "Zakhar" Zakharov (Сергей «Захар» Захаров) - bass guitar (2006-2013)

== Discography ==
Date of Release	Title	Translation
1996	Камнем по голове	Stone to the Head
1997	Король и Шут	King and Jester
1999	Акустический альбом	Acoustic Album
1999	Ели мясо мужики (live)	Men Were Eating Meat
2000	Герои и злодеи	Heroes and Villains
2001	Собрание	Gathering
2001	Как в старой сказке	Like in an Old Tale
2002	Жаль, нет ружья!	Alas, I Have No Rifle!
2003	Мёртвый анархист (DVD)	Dead Anarchist
2004	Бунт на корабле	Mutiny on the Ship
2006	Продавец кошмаров	Trader of Nightmares
2007	Страшные Сказки	Scary Tales
2008	Тень Клоуна	The Clown's Shadow
2010	Театр демона	Demon's Theatre
2011	TODD. Акт 1. Праздник крови	TODD. Act 1. Feast of Blood
2012	TODD. Акт 2. На краю	TODD. Act 2. At the Edge
2018	Концерт в Олимпийском	Concert at the Olympic Stadium
