= Spitfire (Russian band) =

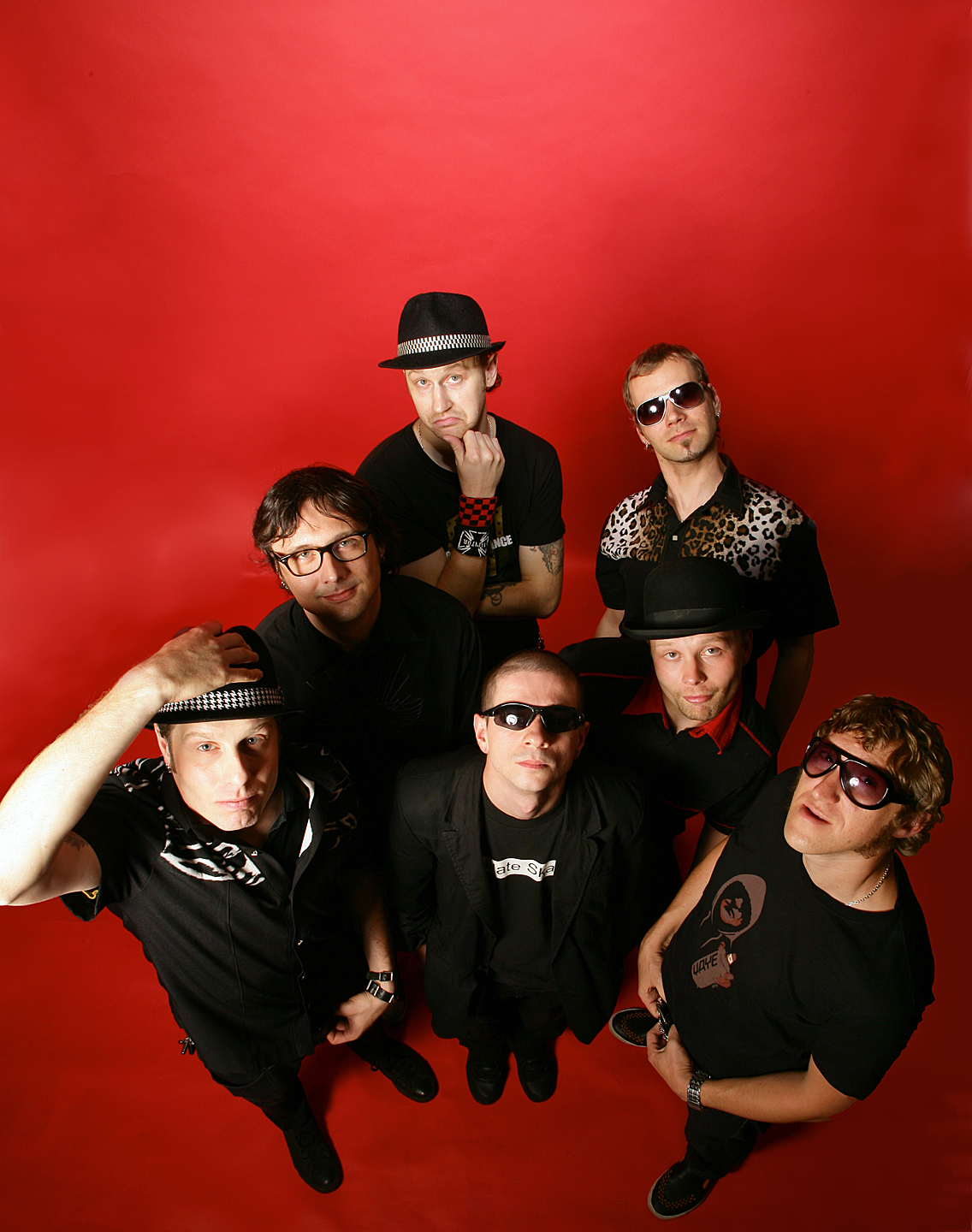
Spitfire

Spitfire is a ska band formed in Saint Petersburg, Russia in 1993.

== Biography ==
Spitfire started in the beginning of 1993, then as a garage rockabilly trio, whose music also included some elements of noise. Their first live gig took place during the St. Petersburg Psycho Festival in February 1993. At the end of 1993, their music had turned into garage punk and finally into ska-core.

In the spring 1995 they released a song on the compilation called United Colours of Ska, Volume II, on German Pork Pie label. A year later they recorded an album at St.Petersburg "Melodia" studio, which was then mixed in Berlin at Pork Pie. This album, called Night Hunting, was released in the end of 1996.

In January 1999 Spitfire had made another recording session at Vielklang studio in Berlin, and the result came out in the spring with new album The Coast Is Clear.

In the spring 2001 a keyboard player joined the band making its sound even more powerful. At the same time Spitfire started a spinoff project St. Petersburg Ska-Jazz Review in collaboration with the members of St.Petersburg-based afro-caribbean-oriented band Markscheider Kunst. The initial idea was to make a single-show program comprising mostly jazz standards such as "Sidewinder", "Corcovado", "Four" and original ska tunes ("St. Thomas", "Man in the street") to perform at Sergey Kuryokhin International Festival (SKIF) in April 2001.

In November 2001 Spitfire musicians were invited to participate in the recording session of the band Leningrad. This band was one of the top acts on Russian music scene. The style of Leningrad music is hard to describe, since the regular play-list of their live show includes numbers stylistically varying from ska and reggae to punk and funky hip-hop. The Leningrad album "21st Century Pirates" was released in February 2002 and the whole Spitfire line-up was invited to perform at Leningrad album release show at Yubileyny Sports Palace in St. Petersburg. From that show on Spitfire musicians work together with Leningrad on albums - For millions (2003), Second Magadan (2003), Babarobot (2004), Huinya (2005; together with cabaret Tiger Lillies), Awrora (2007) - and played many gigs in Russia and Europe. In the end of 2008 the singer Shnur decided to split Leningrad up.

In November-December 2002 Spitfire, St. Petersburg Ska-Jazz Review and Leningrad toured the United States. 15 gigs were performed all over the Atlantic coast from Boston to Miami. All events were of much interest for American audience. The second American tour of Leningrad and Spitfire happened in the summer 2003. The bands performed live in such venues as Irving Plaza and CBGB (New York City), Middle East (Boston), The Knitting Factory (Los Angeles).

In January 2004 the third Spitfire album Thrills And Kills came out both in Europe on German Vielklang label and in Russia on recently opened independent Shnur'OK label. In 2008 Spitfire released their fourth album "Lifetime Visa". In 2012, they released their fifth album, "5".
