= Akustichesky Albom =

Akusticheskii Albom

Studio album by Korol i Shut
- Released: 1999
- Genre: Folk rock
- Length: 53:13

Korol i Shut chronology
Korol i Shut (1996)	Akusticheskii Albom (1996)	Geroi i Zlodei (1999)

Akustichesky Albom (Russian: Акустический Альбом, lit. Acoustic Album) is an album of the Russian rock group "Korol i Shut", released in 1999. At the core of the album is poured acoustic music, most of the songs on the theme of love lyrics.

== Track listing ==
1. Kukla Kolduna (Sorcerer's Puppet, Russian: Кукла Колдуна) 3:23
2. Nablyudatel (The Spectator, Russian: Наблюдатель) 4:44
3. Bednyazhka (Poor, Russian: Бедняжка) 4:10
4. Prygnu so Skaly (Jump Off a Cliff, Russian: Прыгну со Скалы) 3:12
5. Devushka i Graf (The Girl and The Count, Russian: Девушка и Граф) 4:33
6. Pesnya Mushketyorov (Song of Musketeers, Russian: Песня Мушкетеров) 3:48
7. Tyani! (Pull on!Russian: Тяни!) 2:56
8. Utrenny Rassvet (Morning Dawn, Russian: Утренний Рассвет) 2:29
9. Sosiska (Sausage, Russian: Сосиска) 2:12
10. Karapuz (Little Fellow, Russian: Карапуз) 2:34
11. Spyatil Otets (Father gone crazy, Russian: Спятил Отец) 3:30
12. Vedma i Osyol (The Witch and the Donkey, Russian: Ведьма и Осел) 2:57
13. Yekaterina (Russian: Екатерина) 2:13
14. Prervannaya Lyubov (Interrupted Love, Russian: Прерванная Любовь) 2:57
15. Mototsikl (Motorcycle, Russian: Мотоцикл) 2:10
16. Golye Koki (Naked Balls, Russian: Голые Коки) 2:39
17. Zabytye Botinki (Left Boots, Russian: Забытые Ботинки) 2:46
