= Kamnem po golove =

Studio album by Korol i Shut
- Released: 1996
- Recorded: August–September 1996
- Genre: Folk punk, punk rock
- Length: 51:44

Korol i Shut chronology
Kamnem po golove (1996)	Korol i Shut (Album) (1997)

Kamnem po golove (literally Stone onto a Head, Russian: Камнем по голове) is the debut album of Russian rock group Korol i Shut, released in 1996.

== Track listing ==
Source: Official site

No.	Title	English translation	Length
1.	"Smelchak i Veter" (Russian: Смельчак и ветер)	The Daredevil and the Wind	3:03
2.	"Prokaznik Skomorokh" (Russian: Проказник Скоморох)	Mischievous Harlequin	1:52
3.	"Vernaya Zhena" (Russian: Верная Жена)	Faithful Wife	2:37
4.	"Sadovnik" (Russian: Садовник)	The Gardener	3:42
5.	"Bluzhdayut Teni" (Russian: Блуждают Тени)	Wandering Shadows	2:11
6.	"Vnezapnaya Golova" (Russian: Внезапная Голова)	Sudden Head	2:24
7.	"Shar Goluboy" (Russian: Шар Голубой)	Light Blue Ball	1:14
8.	"Zlodey i Shapka" (Russian: Злодей и Шапка)	The Villain and the Hat	2:16
9.	"Ot Zhenshchin Krugom Golova" (Russian: От женщин кругом голова)	Women Drive Me Crazy	1:30
10.	"Rybak" (Russian: Рыбак)	The Fisherman	1:16
11.	"Mototsikl" (Russian: Мотоцикл)	Motorcycle	2:37
12.	"Kholodnoye Telo" (Russian: Холодное тело)	The Cold Body	2:40
13.	"Durak i Molniya" (Russian: Дурак и Молния)	The Fool and the Lightning	1:54
14.	"Leshiy Obidelsya" (Russian: Леший Обиделся)	The Wood Goblin Was Offended	2:52
15.	"Dva Vora i Moneta" (Russian: Два вора и монета)	Two Thieves and a Gold Coin	2:16
16.	"Lyubov i Propeller" (Russian: Любовь и Пропеллер)	Love and the Propeller	2:55
17.	"Kamnem po Golove" (Russian: Камнем по Голове)	Stone to the Head	2:37
18.	"S tekh por kak on ushol" (Russian: С тех пор как он ушел)	Since He Has Left	2:16
19.	"V dome sueta" (Russian: В доме суета)	Bustle in the House	2:31
20.	"Lesnye Razboyniki" (Russian: Лесные Разбойники)	Forest Thieves	3:55
21.	"Mariya" (Russian: Мария)	Maria	4:03
