= Markscheider Kunst =

Russian ska band

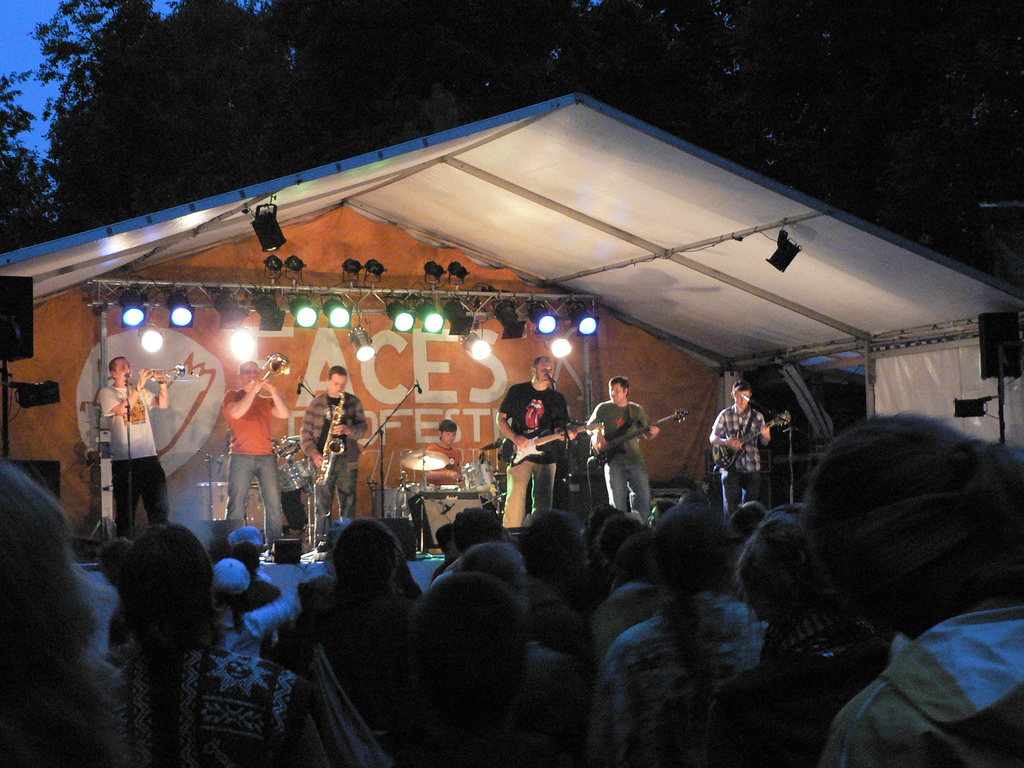
- Markscheider Kunst performing in 2007

Background information
- Origin: Saint Petersburg, Russia
- Genres: rockabilly; world; reggae; ska jazz
- Years active: 1992–present
- Members: Kirill Oskin; Vladimir Matushkin; Kirill Ipatov; Denis Rachkov; Danila Prokopev; Yegor Popov; Anton Boyarskikh
- Past members: Sergey Yegorov; Serafim Makangila; Mitya Khramtsov; Vadim Yagman; Aleksey Kanev; Ramil Shamsutdinov; Mikhail Nikolayev; Aleksandr Plyusnin; Ivan Neklyudov; Anton Vishnyakov; Ilya Vymenits; Pavel Vasilyev; Sergei Yefremenko
- Website: www.mkunst.ru

Markscheider Kunst (Маркшейдер Кунст) is a ska band from Saint Petersburg, Russia. It plays afro-rock, soukous, ska and reggae. The band was founded in 1992 by mine surveying students from Saint Petersburg. Lead singer Sergei Yefremenko died on 22 January 2024, at the age of 51.

== Members ==
=== Current members ===
- Kirill Oskin (1992–present) – bass, backing vocals
- Vladimir Matushkin (Nguba) (1995–present) – guitar, backing vocals
- Kirill Ipatov (1995–present) – timbales, conga
- Denis Rachkov (2000–present) – guitar
- Danila Prokopev (2007–present) – drums, timbales
- Yegor Popov (2017–present) – trumpet
- Anton Boyarskikh (2017–present) – trombone
- Ilya Vymenits (1997–present) – timbales, conga, bongos

=== Former members ===
- Sergei Yefremenko (EFR) (1992–2024; his death) – guitar, vocals, lyrics
- Sergey Yegorov (Snegoriy) (1992–2007) – drums, backing vocals
- Serafim Makangila (1996–2003) – vocals
- Mitya Khramtsov (1996–1998) –
- Vadim Yagman (1999–2002) – trumpet
- Aleksey Kanev (1999–2002) – saxophone
- Ramil Shamsutdinov (1999–2004) – trombone
- Mikhail Nikolayev (2001–2005) – timbales, conga
- Alexander Plyusnin (2003–2017) – trumpet
- Ivan Neklyudov (2004–2017) – saxophone
- Anton Vishnyakov (2005–2017) – trombone
- Pavel Vasilyev (2017–2018) – keyboards

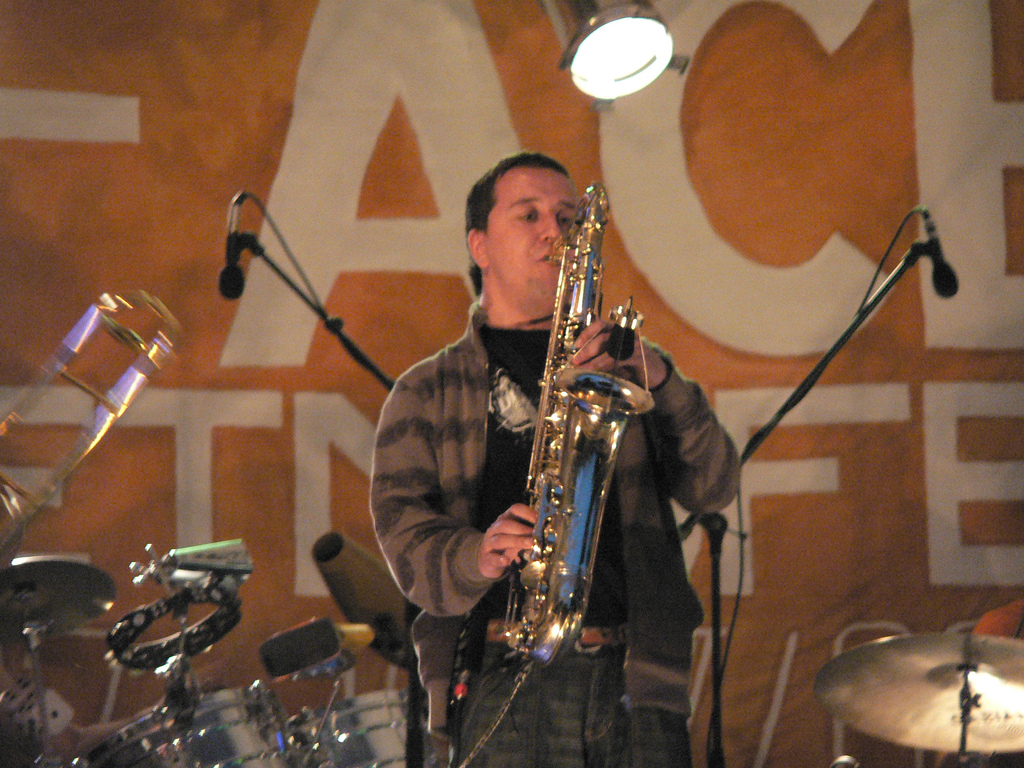
Ivan Neklyudov

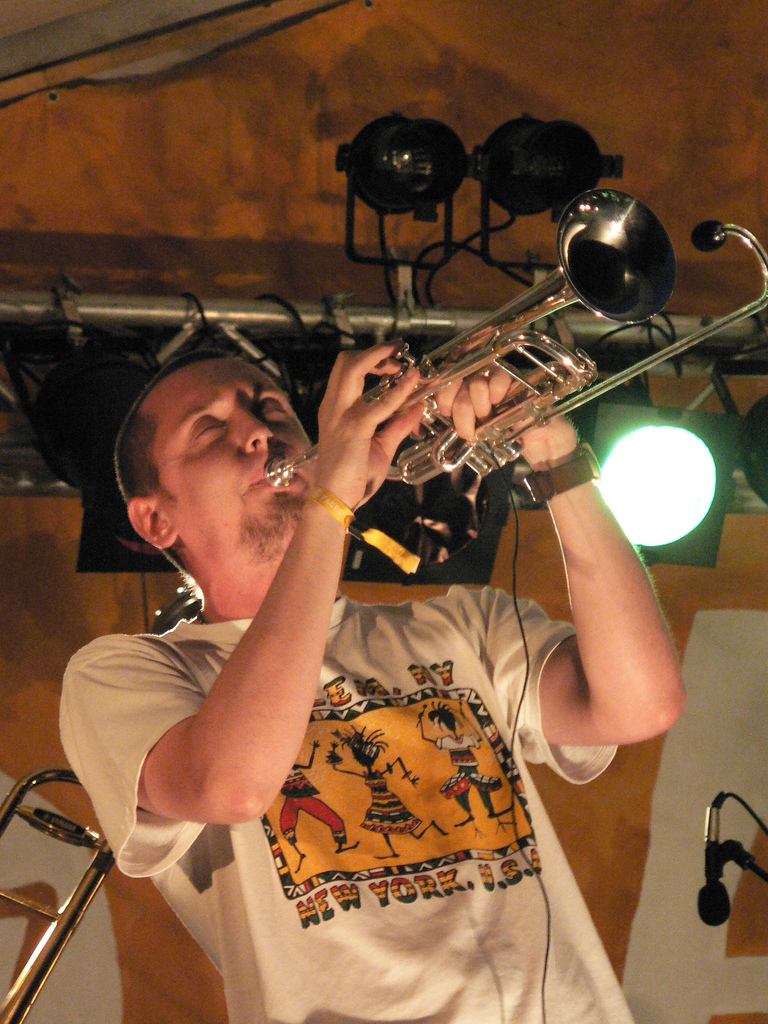
Aleksandr Plyusnin

== Discography ==
- R. F. O. (1992)
- Kem Byt? (1994/1996)
- Live in Helsinki (single) (1997)
- St.Petersburg-Kinshasa Transit (1998)
- Krasivo Sleva (2001)
- Na Svyazi (2003)
- Ryba (maxisingle) (2006)
- Café Babalu (2008)
- Utopia (2010)
- FREEDOM (2020)
