= Tequilajazzz =

Russian alternative rock band

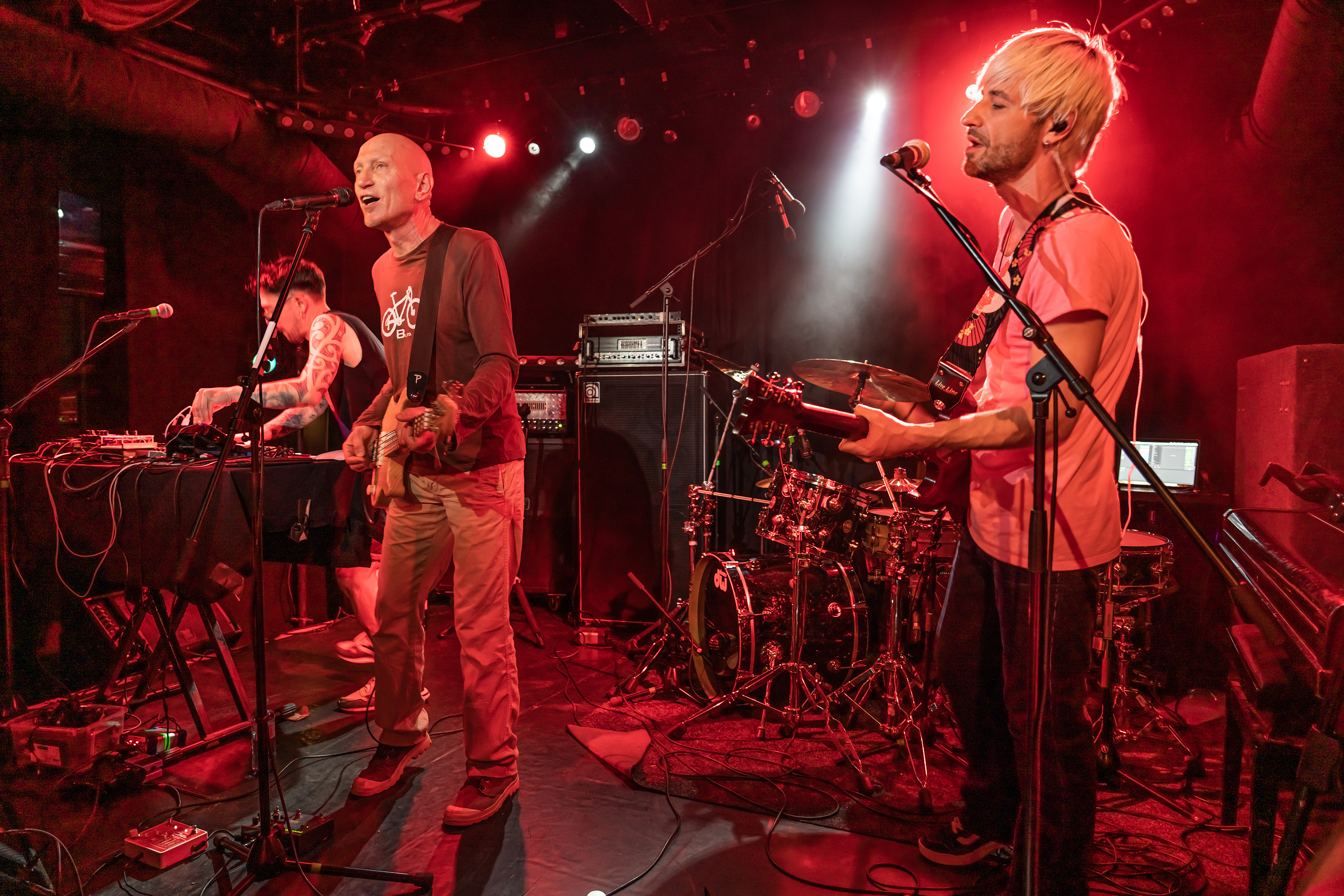
- Tequilajazzz in April 2024

Background information
- Origin: Saint Petersburg, Russia
- Genres: Alternative rock, experimental rock, electronic rock
- Years active: 1993–2010, 2013–2015, 2016–present
- Members: Evgeny "Ai-yai-yai" Fedorov; Konstantin Fedorov; Aleksey Alyarkinsky; Oleg Emirov
- Past members: Aleksandr "Dooser" Voronov; Oleg Baranov (deceased)

Tequilajazzz is a Russian alternative rock band led by bassist Evgeny "Ai-yai-yai" Fedorov (Russian: Евгений "Ай-яй-яй" Фёдоров) based in Saint Petersburg. Band members also included drummer Aleksandr "Dooser" Voronov (Russian: Александр "Дусер" Воронов) on the drums, Konstantin Fedorov (Russian: Константин Федоров), and guitarist Oleg Baranov (Russian: Олег Баранов).

Tequilajazzz officially disbanded in 2010. In 2013, the group reunited and performed anniversary concerts. They recorded an acoustic album, which was released in 2018.

Guitarist Oleg Baranov died on 20 March 2025, at the age of 57.

After the start of the Russian invasion of Ukraine, the band left Russia. Drummer Alexander Voronov was removed from the group for his support of the Russian army, and since then, the band has hired session drummers, including Belgian Benjamin Baert (who also performs with Ukrainian band Vopli Vidopliassova).

== Discography ==
=== Studio albums ===
- Strelyali? (1993)
- Virus (1997)
- Tselluloid (1998)
- 150 Milliardov Shagov (1999)
- Vyshe Oseni (2002)
- Zhurnal Zhivogo (2009)
- Nebylo (2018)
- Kamni (2021)

=== Live albums ===
- Moloko (2000)

=== Singles and EPs ===
- Aborigen (mini-album) (1995)
- Aviatsiya i artilleriya (maxi-single) (1997)
- Virus vs. Virus (with Species of Fishes) (EP) (1997)
- Malenkaya Lozh' (2000)
- Flagi (2023)
- Mashina polnaya zla (2023)

=== Compilation albums ===
- Izbrannoye. Nami (2002)
