= White Lion discography =

- Studio albums: 6
- Live albums: 3
- Compilation albums: 5
- Singles: 32
- Video albums: 5
- Music videos: 22
- Box sets: 3

The following is a comprehensive discography of White Lion, an American/Danish rock band.

White Lion was formed in New York City in 1983 by Danish vocalist Mike Tramp and American guitarist Vito Bratta. Mainly active in the 1980s and early 1990s, releasing their debut album Fight to Survive in 1985. The band achieved success with their number eight hit "Wait" and number three hit "When the Children Cry" from their second album, the double platinum selling Pride. The band continued their success with their third album, Big Game which achieved Gold status and their fourth album Mane Attraction which included a supporting tour. White Lion disbanded in 1992 and not long after their first compilation album, The Best of White Lion was released.

Mike Tramp reformed White Lion with all new musicians in 1999 and again following a failed attempt to reform the original line up and several legal issues in 2004. The new White Lion released a live album in 2005 and a brand new studio album Return of the Pride in 2008.

From 2023, Tramp would bring his version of White Lion back with a trilogy of albums featuring re-recorded versions of White Lion classics, appropriately titled, The Songs of White Lion.

== Studio albums ==
Year	Details	Peak chart positions									Sales	Certifications
Year	Details	US	AUS	CAN	GER	NLD	NOR	SWE	SWI	UK	Sales	Certifications
1986	Fight to Survive: Released: January 21, 1986; Label: Atlantic; Formats: CD	151	–	–	–	–	–	–	–	–		
1987	Pride: Released: June 22, 1987; Label: Atlantic; Formats: CD	11	149	44	–	–	–	30	–	–		CAN: Platinum; US: 2× Platinum
1989	Big Game: Released: June 5, 1989; Label: Atlantic; Formats: CD	19	119	28	38	88	14	13	16	47		US: Platinum
1991	Mane Attraction: Released: April 2, 1991; Label: Atlantic; Formats: CD	61	–	–	35	–	–	23	11	31	US: 234,259+	
1999	Remembering White Lion: Released: October 5, 1999, and re-released in 2004 as Last Roar; Label: Cleopatra; Formats: CD	–	–	–	–	–	–	–	–	–		
2008	Return of the Pride: Released: March 14, 2008; Label: Frontiers; Format: CD	–	–	–	–	–	–	–	–	–		

== Live albums ==
Year	Details
2005	Rocking the USA: Release: November 8, 2005; Label: Frontiers Italy; Formats: CD
2007	Live Extended Versions: Release: August 28, 2007; Label: Formats: CD
2009	White Lion Live: Release: 2009; Label: Formats: CD

== Compilations ==
Year	Title	Sales
1992	The Best of White Lion: Release: September 15, 1992; Label: Atlantic; Formats: CD	US: 148,352+
2000	White Lion Hits: Release: 2000 and re-released in 2007 as "When the Children Cry and Other Hits"; Label: Rhino; Formats: CD	
2002	The Essential White Lion: Release: 2002; Label: Atlantic; Formats: CD	
2006	Anthology 83-89: Release: 2006; Label: Cleopatra; Formats: CD	
2007	The Definitive Rock Collection: Release: 2007; Label: Atlantic; Formats: CD	

=== Box sets ===
Year	Title
2002	The Atlantic Albums: Release date: 2002; Label: Atlantic
2004	The Bootleg Series: Release date: 2004 and re-released in 2009 as "Lost Tracks, Demos & Odities"; Label:
2020	All You Need Is Rock 'N' Roll: The Complete Albums 1985–1991: Release date: 2020; Label: HNE

== Singles ==
Year	Song	Peak chart positions							Album
Year	Song	US	US Main.	AUS	CAN	NLD	SWE	UK	Album
1985	"Broken Heart"	–	–	–	–	–	–	–	Fight to Survive
1986	"El Salvador"	–	–	–	–	–	–	–	Fight to Survive
1987	"Wait"	8	18	–	48	–	–	88	Pride
1988	"Tell Me"	58	25	–	–	–	–	–	Pride
1988	"When the Children Cry"	3	7	175	2	–	7	88	Pride
1988	"All You Need is Rock 'N' Roll"	–	–	–	–	–	–	–	Pride
1988	"Don't Give Up" [promo]	–	–	–	–	–	–	–	Pride
1989	"Little Fighter"	52	12	136	65	–	–	–	Big Game
1989	"Radar Love"	59	–	117	–	–	–	–	Big Game
1990	"Cry for Freedom"	–	–	–	–	19	–	47	Big Game
1990	"Goin' Home Tonight"	–	–	–	–	–	–	–	Big Game
1990	"If My Mind Is Evil" [promo]	–	–	–	–	–	–	–	Big Game
1991	"Love Don't Come Easy"	–	24	–	–	–	–	–	Mane Attraction
1991	"Lights and Thunder"	–	–	–	–	–	–	95	Mane Attraction
1991	"Broken Heart '91"	–	–	–	–	–	31	–	Mane Attraction
1992	"You're All I Need"	–	–	–	–	–	–	–	Mane Attraction
1999	"When the Children Cry '99"	–	–	–	–	–	–	–	Remembering White Lion
2005	"Wait (Live)"	–	–	–	–	–	–	–	Rocking the USA
2005	"When the Children Cry (Live)"	–	–	–	–	–	–	–	Rocking the USA
2008	"Dream"	–	–	–	–	–	–	–	Return of the Pride
2008	"Live Your Life"	–	–	–	–	–	–	–	Return of the Pride
2023	"Cry for Freedom (2023)"	–	–	–	–	–	–	–	Songs of White Lion Vol. 1
2023	"Little Fighter (2023)"	–	–	–	–	–	–	–	Songs of White Lion Vol. 1
2024	"Lights and Thunder (2024)"	–	–	–	–	–	–	–	Songs of White Lion Vol. 2
2024	"Lonely Nights"	–	–	–	–	–	–	–	Songs of White Lion Vol. 2
2024	"Out With the Boys"	–	–	–	–	–	–	–	Songs of White Lion Vol. 2
2024	"The Road to Valhalla"	–	–	–	–	–	–	–	Songs of White Lion Vol. 2
2024	"Till Death Do Us Part"	–	–	–	–	–	–	–	Songs of White Lion Vol. 2
2025	"Cherokee"	–	–	–	–	–	–	–	Songs of White Lion Vol. 3
2025	"Fight to Survive"	–	–	–	–	–	–	–	Songs of White Lion Vol. 3
2025	"All Burn in Hell"	–	–	–	–	–	–	–	Songs of White Lion Vol. 3
2025	"Radar Love (2025)"	–	–	–	–	–	–	–	Songs of White Lion Vol. 3
2025	"If My Mind is Evil"	–	–	–	–	–	–	–	Songs of White Lion Vol. 3

== Videos ==
Year	Title	Description
1988	Live at the Ritz: Release: 1988; Label: Format: DVD/VHS	Concert filmed at the Ritz in New York City, NY. Also released on CD.
1988	One Night in Tokyo: Release: 1988; Label: Format: DVD/VHS	Concert filmed in Tokyo, Japan.
1992	Escape from Brooklyn: Release: 1992; Label: Atlantic Records; Format: DVD/VHS	Music videos, behind the scenes footage and interviews with band members.
2005	Concert Anthology: 1987–1991: Release: 2005; Label: Atlantic Records; Format: DVD	Collection of concerts from 1987 to 1991. (The best of Live at the Ritz and One Night in Tokyo) Re-released in 2010 with a bonus CD.
2008	Bang Your Head Festival 2005'': Release: December 5, 2008; Label: Frontiers Records; Format: DVD	Performance at the 2005 Bang Your Head Festival in Germany.

=== Music videos ===
Year	Title
1985	"Broken Heart"
1988	"Wait"
1988	"Tell Me"
1988	"When the Children Cry"
1989	"Little Fighter"
1989	"Radar Love"
1990	"Cry for Freedom"
1990	"Goin' Home Tonight"
1991	"Love Don't Come Easy"
1991	"Broken Heart '91"
1992	"Farewell to You"
2005	"Lights and Thunder (Live video)"
2024	"Lights and Thunder (2024)"
2024	"Lonely Nights"
2024	"Out With the Boys"
2024	"The Road to Valhalla"
2024	"Till Death Do Us Part"
2025	"Cherokee"
2025	"Fight to Survive"
2025	"All Burn in Hell"
2025	"Radar Love (2025)"
2025	"If My Mind is Evil"
