= The Best of White Lion =

Greatest hits album by White Lion
- Released: September 15, 1992
- Recorded: 1987–91
- Genre: Glam metal
- Length: 67:44
- Label: Atlantic; J!mco Records (Japan)
- Producer: Michael Wagener

White Lion chronology
Mane Attraction (1991)	The Best of White Lion (1992)	Remembering White Lion (1999)

Professional ratings
Review scores
Source	Rating
Allmusic	4.5/5 stars

The Best of White Lion is the first greatest hits compilation album from the glam metal band White Lion, released in September 1992. The compilation features all of White Lion's charted singles from their three most successful albums: Pride, Big Game and Mane Attraction.

== Overview ==
The album features live versions of "Lady of the Valley" and "All You Need Is Rock'N Roll". "Broken Heart" was initially released on the band's debut album Fight to Survive but later re-recorded on the Mane Attraction album. In some countries, "You're All I Need" (from the band's last studio album Mane Attraction) is included as the first track of the compilation, sometimes as a hidden (unlisted) track.

In 2000 a second best of album was released titled "White Lion Hits" which was also re-released as "When the Children Cry and Other Hits" in 2007 and In 2002 an updated compilation was released titled "The Essential White Lion".

== Track listing ==
1. "You're All I Need" (Philippines bonus track) - 4:25
2. "Wait" - 4:01
3. "Radar Love" - 5:56
4. "Broken Heart" - 4:07
5. "Hungry" - 3:56
6. "Little Fighter" - 4:22
7. "Lights and Thunder" - 8:06
8. "All You Need Is Rock 'n' Roll" (Live Version) - 5:41
9. "When the Children Cry" - 4:22
10. "Love Don't Come Easy" - 4:09
11. "Cry for Freedom" - 6:11
12. "Lady of the Valley" (Live Version) - 7:40
13. "Tell Me" - 4:29
14. "Farewell to You" - 4:21

All songs written by Bratta & Tramp, except for "Radar Love" (which is a Golden Earring cover).

== Band members ==
- Mike Tramp - vocals
- Vito Bratta - guitars
- James Lomenzo - bass
- Greg D'Angelo - drums

== Sales and certifications ==
Region	Certification	Certified units/sales
Philippines	Gold	
United States	—	148,352
