= Rock 'N' Roll Alive =

Live album by Mike Tramp
- Released: 2003
- Recorded: 2003
- Genre: Hard rock
- Label: Ulftone

Mike Tramp chronology
| More to Life Than This (2003) | Rock 'N' Roll Alive (2003) | Songs I Left Behind (2004) |

Rock 'N' Roll Alive is a double disc live album from former White Lion and Freak of Nature lead singer, Mike Tramp, released in 2003.

== Recording and release ==
The album was recorded live at the Pumphouse in Copenhagen, Denmark from his tour in support of his album More to Life Than This, which was also released in 2003.

This is the first live compilation album released by Mike Tramp/White Lion and the only album to feature tracks from White Lion, Freak of Nature and Mike Tramp's solo music. It includes a cover of Neil Young's "Rockin' in the Free World".

In 2005, a White Lion live album was released, titled Rocking the USA.

== Track listing ==
=== Disc 1 ===
1. "Live for Today"
2. "If It Ain't Gonna Rock"
3. "Living on the Edge"
4. "Lay Down My Life for You"
5. "Mr Death"
6. "Better Off"
7. "Broken Heart"
8. "Follow Your Dreams"
9. "Wait"

=== Disc 2 ===
1. "Falling Down"
2. "Little Fighter"
3. "Living a Lie"
4. "What Am I"
5. "Nothing at All"
6. "I Won't Let Go"
7. "More to Life Than This"
8. "When the Children Cry"
9. "Rockin' in the Free World"

== Credits ==
- Mike Tramp – vocals, electric guitar, acoustic guitar
- Oliver Steffensen – guitar
- Claus Langeskov – bass guitar
- Kasper Foss – drums
- Dan Hemmer – Hammond B-3
