= Songs of White Lion =

Studio album by Mike Tramp's White Lion
- Released: Vol. 1 - 14 April 2023; Vol. 2 - 23 August 2024; Vol. 3 - 19 September 2025
- Genre: Hard rock
- Length: Vol. 1 - 55:56; Vol. 2 - 46:13; Vol. 3 - 46:32
- Label: Frontiers Music
- Producer: Mike Tramp, Soren Andersen

Mike Tramp's White Lion chronology
Everything Is Alright (2021)	Songs of White Lion (2023)

Singles from Songs of White Lion Trilogy
- 1. "Cry for Freedom" Released: 2023; 2. "Little Fighter" Released: 2023; 3. "Lights and Thunder" Released: 2024; 4. "Lonely Nights" Released: 2024; 5. "Out With the Boys" Released: 2024; 6. "The Road to Valhalla" Released: 2024; 7. "Till Death Do Us Part" Released: 2024; 8. "Cherokee" Released: 2025; 9. "Fight to Survive" Released: 2025; 10. "All Burn in Hell" Released: 2025; 11. "Radar Love" Released: 2025; 12. "If My Mind is Evil" Released: 2025

Songs of White Lion is a trilogy of albums by Mike Tramp's White Lion featuring new re-recorded versions of White Lion songs, released via Frontiers Music. Volume 1 was released on April 14, 2023, Volume 2 was released on August 23, 2024 and Volume 3 was released on September 19, 2025. As the title implies, the new albums sees Tramp re-imagining select cuts from White Lion's catalog, including the bands biggest hits: "When the Children Cry", "Wait", and "Little Fighter".

== Background ==
Songs of White Lion Volume 1 comes out only one year after his most recent release in 2022, For Første Gang, the album which Tramp sung a full set of songs entirely in Danish for the first time in his career.

Songs of White Lion sees Tramp bringing his version of White Lion back, and follows Tramp's previous release of re-recorded White Lion songs when he was first attempting to reform White Lion in 1999, on the album Remembering White Lion. To avoid legal issues with former members, the band was known as Tramp's White Lion when that album was re-released in 2004 under the title Last Roar.

Since 2009, following White Lion's last studio album Return of the Pride, Tramp has been writing and recording as a solo artist releasing nine studio albums, Songs of White Lion is a tribute to Tramp's most successful band of his career. With various incarnations of White Lion leading to 2008's studio reunion, this album completes the circle.

Songs of White Lion Volume 2 was released a few months after Tramp released his second Danish album, Mand Af En Tid. Songs of White Lion 2 features Tramp re-imagining ten more select cuts from White Lion's catalog

Mike Tramp has finished work on "Songs Of White Lion - Vol. III" which completes the 'Songs Of White Lion' trilogy. In the final installment, Tramp revisits and reimagines ten more essential songs from the White Lion catalog.

== Release ==
A re-recorded "Cry for Freedom" was released as the first single for "Songs of White Lion", followed by a reworked take on "Little Fighter".

Mike Tramp embarked on an extensive U.S. tour in May 2023. The Songs of White Lion trek, which was originally supposed to take place in April/May 2020, will see Tramp performing White Lion hits.

Songs of White Lion Volume 2 features the new single and music video for the re-recorded "Lights and Thunder" and the reworked "Lonely Nights", "Out With the Boys", "The Road to Valhalla" and "Till Death Do Us Part" were also released as singles featuring visualizer music videos. Tramp will embark on an extended tour supporting Songs of White Lion Volume 2 starting in mid-August 2024 with European and US dates, followed by Australia in 2025.

Songs of White Lion Volume 3 features the new single of the re-recorded "Cherokee" which is accompanied by a music video, followed by a new single of the reimagined "Fight to Survive" which features an official music video.The song "All Burn in Hell" was also released as a single with a visualizer video. The new reimagined version is a tribute to Ozzy Osbourne. To celebrate the release of Vol 3, Tramp also shared a reimagined version of the single “Radar Love,” accompanied by a visualizer. Tramp also shared the single and video for “If My Mind is Evil” (Halloween Edition) wishing everyone a Happy Halloween.

== Track listing ==
Songs of White Lion Vol. 1 track listing
No.	Title	Length
1.	"Lady of the Valley"	6:47
2.	"Little Fighter"	4:30
3.	"Broken Heart"	4:12
4.	"Love Don't Come Easy"	3:38
5.	"Hungry"	4:20
6.	"Cry for Freedom"	4:28
7.	"Goin' Home Tonight"	4:37
8.	"Wait"	4:16
9.	"All the Fallen Men"	4:38
10.	"Living on the Edge"	4:43
11.	"Tell Me"	4:42
12.	"When the Children Cry"	5:05
13.	"Cry for Freedom (Alternative version)" (Japanese bonus track)	4:25
Total length:		55:56

Songs of White Lion Vol. 2 track listing
No.	Title	Length
1.	"Lights and Thunder"	6:40
2.	"Lonely Nights"	4:37
3.	"Till Death Do Us Part"	4:43
4.	"El Salvador"	4:17
5.	"The Road to Valhalla"	3:58
6.	"Don't Give Up"	3:21
7.	"You're AII I Need"	4:29
8.	"Out with the Boys"	4:47
9.	"All You Need Is Rock 'n' Roll"	3:39
10.	"Farewell to You"	3:52
11.	"Little Fighter (Classical orchestra version)" (Japanese bonus track)	4:24
Total length:		46:07

Songs of White Lion Vol. 3 track listing
No.	Title	Length
1.	"Dirty Woman"	3:34
2.	"Warsong"	6:05
3.	"Fight to Survive"	5:05
4.	"She's Got Everything"	4:30
5.	"In the City"	4:23
6.	"If My Mind is Evil"	5:01
7.	"Cherokee"	4:49
8.	"All Burn in Hell"	4:04
9.	"Don't Say It's Over"	3:58
10.	"Radar Love"	4:58
Total length:		46:32

== Personnel ==
Band members

- Mike Tramp – vocals, producer
- Marcus Nand – guitars
- Claus Langeskov – bass
- Alan Tschicaja – drums - Vol 1
- Kenni Andy - drums - Vol 2
- Morten Hellborn - drums - Vol 3

Production

- Soren Andersen – producer

=== Additional personnel ===
- Sebastian Groset – keyboard
- Christoffer Stjerne – harmonies on Vol 1
- Emily Garriock Langeskov - harmonies on Vol 2
- Claudio Pesavento - hammond & piano on Vol 2

== Charts ==
Chart performance for Songs of White Lion
Chart (2023)	Peak position
Swiss Albums (Schweizer Hitparade)	69
UK Independent album chart	17
