= Rocking the USA =

Live album by White Lion

Live album by White Lion
- Released: November 8, 2005
- Recorded: 2005
- Genre: Glam metal
- Length: 94:43
- Label: Frontiers
- Producer: Michael Wagener

White Lion chronology
Last Roar (2004)	Rocking the USA (2005)	Anthology 83-89 (2006)

Singles from Rocking the USA
- 1. "Wait (Live)" Released: 2005; 2. "When the Children Cry (Live)" Released: 2005

Professional ratings
Review scores
Source	Rating
AllMusic	3.5/5 stars

Rocking the USA is the first White Lion live compilation album released in 2005, now better known as Tramp's White Lion or White Lion 2, with all new band members again but still features original lead singer Mike Tramp.

== Background and recording ==
Following the release of five solo albums in the last seven years ending with the album Songs I Left Behind in 2004, Tramp continued with the reformation of White Lion. The album Last Roar which was also released in 2004 featured new re-recorded versions of White Lion classic tracks and with the new line up Tramp went on tour in 2005. The album was produced by engineer and producer Michael Wagener, who also produced the band's studio albums Pride and Big Game and features the band's live set.

All the songs on Rocking the USA are taken from the recent tour with the new line up and features all of White Lion's charted singles from their first four studio albums.

== Release and promotion ==
The live versions of "Wait" and "When the Children Cry" were released as promo and later iTunes singles and were also released as bonus tracks on Return of the Pride in 2008.

A live music video was made for the song "Lights and Thunder" which features on the White Lion DVD Bang Your Head Festival 2005.

In 2007, a single disc edition of the album was released under the title White Lion: Live Extended Versions.

== Track listing ==
=== Disc 1 ===
1. "Lights and Thunder" - 7:18
2. "Hungry" - 4:20
3. "Lonely Nights" - 5:16
4. "Love Don't Come Easy" - 4:57
5. "Broken Heart" - 4:19
6. "Fight to Survive" - 6:23
7. "Cry for Freedom" - 5:45
8. "You're All I Need" - 4:30
9. "Little Fighter" - 5:25

=== Disc 2 ===
1. "It's Over" - 5:26
2. "Living on the Edge" - 5:46
3. "Tell Me" - 5:16
4. "Wait" - 4:23
5. "Lady of the Valley" - 7:47
6. "When the Children Cry" - 5:30
7. "Radar Love" - 12:22

=== Single disc edition (Extended Versions) ===
1. "Hungry" - 4:20
2. "Lady of the Valley" - 7:47
3. "Broken Heart" - 4:19
4. "Tell Me" - 5:16
5. "When the Children Cry" - 5:30
6. "You're All I Need" - 4:30
7. "Living on the Edge" - 5:46
8. "Radar Love" - 12:22
9. "Little Fighter" - 5:25
10. "Wait" - 4:23

== Band members ==
- Mike Tramp – vocals
- Jamie Law – guitar
- Claus Langeskov – bass
- Troy Patrick Farrell – drums
- Hennig Wanner – keyboards

=== Production ===
- Michael Wagener – producer
- Adam Logan – engineer

== Bang Your Head Festival 2005 ==
Bang Your Head Festival 2005

Video by White Lion
- Released: December 5, 2008
- Recorded: 2005
- Label: Frontiers

The new line-up of White Lion performed at the 2005 Bang Your Head Festival in Germany. It was the band's return concert and released as a live DVD on December 5, 2008. The DVD also includes a full length interview with Mike Tramp, a slide show, and performances of songs from the US tour. The DVD also features a live music video for the song "Lights and Thunder" showing the band performing through the USA.

All the songs on the DVD feature on the White Lion live album Rocking the USA.

=== DVD Track listing ===
1. "Lights and Thunder"
2. "Hungry"
3. "Lonely Nights"
4. "Broken Heart"
5. "Fight to Survive"
6. "Little Fighter"
7. "Living on the Edge"
8. "Tell Me"
9. "Wait"
10. "Radar Love"
11. "Lady of the Valley" (Slide show)
12. "Lights and Thunder" (Live video from the US tour)
13. "It's Over" (Live in the USA)

=== CD Track listing ===
In 2009, a live CD version of the DVD was released, titled as White Lion Live.

1. "Wait"
2. "Little Fighter"
3. "Tell Me"
4. "Radar Love"
5. "Hungry"
6. "Broken Heart"
7. "Fight to Survive"
8. "Lights and Thunder"
9. "Living on the Edge"
10. "Lonely Nights"
