= Lights and Thunder =

Single by White Lion

from the album Mane Attraction
- B-side: "She's Got Everything"
- Released: March 1991
- Recorded: 1991
- Genre: Glam metal; hard rock
- Length: 8:10
- Label: Atlantic
- Songwriter(s): Mike Tramp; Vito Bratta
- Producer(s): Richie Zito

White Lion singles chronology
"Love Don't Come Easy" (1991)	"Lights and Thunder" (1991)	"Broken Heart '91" (1991)

"Lights and Thunder" is a song by American/Danish glam metal band White Lion and was released as a single in the UK from their 1991 album Mane Attraction. The song charted at No. 95 on the UK Singles Chart.

== Background ==
"Lights and Thunder" was White Lion's longest song, from 1991–2008, an eight-minute heavy rock epic with a complex structure inspired by Led Zeppelin’s Achilles Last Stand. In 2008, "Sangre de Cristo" from Return of the Pride became the band's longest song, with a length of eight minutes and forty-four seconds. The song was one of many songs from the band that addressed social or political issues.

== Music video ==
In 2005, for the White Lion live album Rocking the USA, a music video was made for the live version of the song which features on the DVD Bang Your Head Festival 2005.

== Versions ==
In 2024, Mike Tramp re-recorded "Lights and Thunder" for the Songs of White Lion, Vol. II album. The song was also re-released as a single and featured a new music video.

== Track listing ==
7" single

1. "Lights and Thunder" – 4:56
2. "She's Got Everything" – 5:56

12" maxi-single

1. "Lights and Thunder" (edit)
2. "Fight to Survive" (live)
3. "She's Got Everything"

== Personnel ==
- Mike Tramp – lead vocals
- Vito Bratta – lead guitar
- James Lomenzo – bass guitar
- Greg D'Angelo – drums

== Charts ==
Chart (1991)	Peak position
UK Singles (OCC)	95
