= Songs I Left Behind =

Studio album by Mike Tramp
- Released: December 7, 2004
- Genre: Hard rock
- Label: Frontiers

Mike Tramp chronology
Rock 'N' Roll Alive (2003)	Songs I Left Behind (2004)	The Rock 'N' Roll Circuz (2009)

Songs I Left Behind is the fourth solo album by Mike Tramp. Released in 2004, the album came out only one year after his last studio album More to Life Than This.

The album is a collection of songs recorded in the last seven years and never before released until now. Mike Tramp decided to look through his archives and compile some of the songs that were either demoed or recorded during the sessions of his solo-albums and simply were "left behind" for various reasons.

== Overview ==
The album features bonus alternate versions of "Falling Down" and "Darkness", both originally released on his second solo album Recovering the Wasted Years.

Following the release of this solo album, Tramp took a break from his solo career to focus more on the new White Lion. After the release of a White Lion/Mike Tramp box set and the album Last Roar which were also released in 2004, the new White Lion released the live album Rocking the USA in 2005 and began recording what would become White Lion's first original studio album in sixteen years, Return of the Pride.

== Track listing ==
No.	Title	Length
1.	"Sometimes"
2.	"Do It While You Can"
3.	"Over and Out"
4.	"Love Won't Wait on Me"
5.	"If I Was Real"
6.	"One for Anger, Two for Pain"
7.	"Before the Night"
8.	"I Won't Walk Away"
9.	"Show Me"
10.	"I'll Be There"
11.	"I Don't Believe Anymore"
12.	"What If I"
13.	"Love Me Somebody"
14.	"Think About the Times"
15.	"Falling Down (Alternate version)"
16.	"Darkness (Alternate version)"

== Personnel ==
- Mike Tramp – vocals, electric guitar, acoustic guitar
- Oliver Steffensen – guitar
- Claus Langeskov – bass guitar
- Kasper Foss – drums
- Dan Hemmer – Hammond B-3
- Kasper Damgaard – guitar
- Kenny Korade – rhythm guitar
- Jerry Best – bass guitar
