= Return of the Pride =

Studio album by White Lion
- Released: March 14, 2008
- Recorded: 2007
- Genre: Hard rock, melodic rock
- Length: 57:28
- Label: Frontiers
- Producer: White Lion

White Lion chronology
The Definitive Rock Collection (2007)	Return of the Pride (2008)	Songs of White Lion (2023)

Singles from Return of the Pride
- 1. "Dream" Released: 2008; 2. "Live Your Life" Released: 2008

Professional ratings
Review scores
Source	Rating
AllMusic	3.5/5 stars

Return of the Pride is the fifth studio album featuring original material by White Lion. The album was released in 2008 on March 14 (Europe), April 9 (Japan), April 29 (North America). The album was produced by singer Mike Tramp and bassist Claus Langeskov and recorded during 2007 in both Australia and Copenhagen, Denmark.

== Background and recording ==
Return of the Pride is the first original White Lion studio album since their 1991 album Mane Attraction and is the only studio album with the new-line up which still features original lead singer Mike Tramp. The album is a sequel to the band's 1987 album Pride.

Following the release of the compilation album The Best of White Lion, the band was mostly known as Tramp's White Lion or White Lion 2 for legal reasons with former members but is now once again simply known as White Lion.

Following the release of Return of the Pride, Tramp faced a tumultuous time of professional indecision as he tried to decide between continuing his solo career or pouring his energy into White Lion. In 2009 Tramp released the album The Rock 'N' Roll Circuz which was initially intended to be the next new White Lion album but a new solo band was formed instead.

== Tour ==
The band did a world tour to support the album. The tour began April 17 in Las Vegas and April 18 in Los Angeles at the House of Blues with Ratt. The tour continued through Mexico and South America, and then in Europe on June 8 at Sin City in Wales followed by cities such as London, Paris, Oslo, Madrid, Barcelona, and Bologna, ending in Copenhagen on August 16. White Lion also toured India and played to 42,000 at Shillong, Meghalaya, and a 30,000 plus crowd at the Dimapur stadium in Nagaland. The band was invited to India by the head of the Tripura Royal Family Maharaja Kirit Pradyot Deb Burman.

== Reception ==
Return of the Pride received mostly lukewarm reviews from fans and critics alike. Sea of Tranquility criticized the album for deviating from the core White Lion sound commenting the album "has absolutely nothing in common with the real White Lion." Reviewer Murat Batmaz noted that some of the songs were strong as Mike Tramp solo numbers but did not work under the White Lion moniker due to the absence of guitarist Vito Bratta. Sputnik Music gave the album a similar rating. It was defined as being "conventional" and "[not] horrible." The review also argues that the abundance of keyboards is due to the guitarist not being up to the standards of Bratta. While the reviewer praised Tramp's vocals on some of the songs as being "strong" and "clear," they also pointed out that songs like "Take Me Home" were like a "third-rate" version of "When the Children Cry." Melodic Rock was more positive about the release, awarding it a 91 out of 100. The reviewer likened the songs to older White Lion albums such as Pride and Mane Attraction and considered them an "extension of [Tramp's songwriting]." Rock Eyez gave the album three stars and remarked: "this record is somewhat of a mixed bag to me with some truly good songs and a few misses along the way. Come to think of it, if you look back at the last couple WHITE LION releases before this (“Big Game” and “Mane Attraction”) you sort of got the same thing, so this maybe is closer to the old WHITE LION than I originally thought." The Metal Forge praised the epic song "Sangre De Cristo" comparing it to White Lion's "Lights & Thunder" but also pointed out that he couldn't "help but feel a little misled, cheated and disappointed" with the album in general. Greg Prato of All Music heaped praise on guitarist Jamie Law noting it is "no small task" to fill in Vito Bratta's shoes and described the album opener "Sangre de Cristo" "surprisingly heavy."

== Track listing ==
1. "Sangre de Cristo" - 8:44
2. "Dream" - 5:08
3. "Live Your Life" - 4:52
4. "Set Me Free" - 4:59
5. "I Will" - 4:13
6. "Battle at Little Big Horn" - 7:32
7. "Never Let You Go" - 4:50
8. "Gonna Do It My Way" - 4:24
9. "Finally See the Light" - 4:55
10. "Let Me Be Me" - 4:00

=== Bonus tracks ===
- "Take Me Home" (European bonus track) - 3:50
- "Dream" (Alternate version) (Japanese bonus track)
- "Wait" (Live) (North American bonus track)
- "When the Children Cry" (Live) (North American bonus track)

== Personnel ==
- Mike Tramp - vocals
- Jamie Law - guitars
- Claus Langeskov - bass
- Troy Patrick Farrell - drums
- Henning Wanner - keyboards

== Singles ==
- "Dream"
- "Live Your Life"
