= Love Don't Come Easy =

Single by White Lion

from the album Mane Attraction
- B-side: "Out With the Boys"
- Released: April 1991 (Japan); June 1991 (UK)
- Recorded: 1991
- Genre: Pop rock
- Length: 4:11
- Label: Atlantic
- Songwriter(s): Mike Tramp/Vito Bratta
- Producer(s): Richie Zito

White Lion singles chronology
"Goin' Home Tonight" (1990)	"Love Don't Come Easy" (1991)	"Lights and Thunder" (1991)

"Love Don't Come Easy" is a song and single by American/Danish glam metal band White Lion. The song was the first single presented to radio stations from their 1991 album Mane Attraction and features a music video. The song peaked at number 24 on the Album Rock Tracks chart in the US.

== Background ==
"Love Don't Come Easy" is a classic pop/rock song and was a natural progression from the bands hit single Wait. The song was released when grunge started to become popular. Still, it reached No. 24 on Mainstream Rock charts and along with the next single "Broken Heart 91" which was a re recording of the bands debut single, was the bands last major single release.

The music video opens with shot of a man, played by Craig Clawson, walking into an empty theater, he starts watching clips of a woman jumping into a pool and eventually jumps into the screen to join her.

== Compilations ==
The song along with the rest of the bands singles was featured on all of the bands major compilations including White Lion's 2020 compilation album, "'All You Need Is Rock 'N' Roll - The Complete Albums 1985-1991'".

== Track listing ==
7" single

1. "Love Don't Come Easy" - 4:11
2. "Out with the Boys" - 4:35

12" maxi

1. "Love Don't Come Easy"
2. "Little Fighter" (live)
3. "When the Children Cry" (live)

== Personnel ==
- Mike Tramp - lead vocals
- Vito Bratta - lead guitar
- James Lomenzo - bass guitar
- Greg D'Angelo - drums

== Charts ==
Chart (1991)	Peak position
US Album Rock Tracks	24
