= Little Fighter (song) =

Single by White Lion

from the album Big Game
- A-side: "Little Fighter"
- B-side: "Let's Get Crazy"
- Released: June 1989
- Recorded: 1989
- Genre: Glam metal
- Length: 4:23
- Label: Atlantic
- Songwriters: Mike Tramp; Vito Bratta

White Lion singles chronology
"All You Need is Rock 'N' Roll" (1987)	"Little Fighter" (1989)	"Radar Love" (1989)

"Little Fighter" is a song by American-Danish glam metal band White Lion and was the first single released from the 1989 album Big Game.

The song charted at #52 on the Billboard Hot 100 and #12 on the Mainstream Rock chart in the United States, and #65 in Canada.

== Rainbow Warrior ==
The end of the song's music video features the Greenpeace boat Rainbow Warrior which was destroyed by the French intelligence service while docked in a harbor in Auckland, New Zealand in 1985. In 1989, a fundraising double album was released entitled Greenpeace Rainbow Warriors. In the liner notes for the Big Game album, the lyrics for "Little Fighter" state "In Memory of the Rainbow Warrior".

== Versions and covers ==
The song was re-recorded in 1999 on the album Remembering White Lion (also released as Last Roar in 2004) and a live version was released in 2005 on the live album Rocking the USA.

The song was covered by punk band Death by Stereo on the Punk Goes Metal album, released on August 1, 2000. This was first album released in the Punk Goes... compilation series created by Fearless Records, featuring covers of heavy metal songs performed punk rock bands.

In 2011, it was covered by Red City Radio on a split with The Gamits.

In 2023 Mike Tramp re-recorded "Little Fighter" for the Songs of White Lion album, the song was re-released as a single.

== Track listing ==
1. "Little Fighter" - 4:23
2. "Let's Get Crazy" - 4:52

== Personnel ==
- Mike Tramp - vocals
- Vito Bratta - guitars
- James Lomenzo - bass guitar
- Greg D'Angelo - drums

== Charts ==
=== Weekly charts ===
Chart (1989)	Peak position
Canada Top Singles (RPM)	65
US Billboard Hot 100	52
US Album Rock Tracks (Billboard)	12
