= Broken Heart (White Lion song) =

Single by White Lion

from the album Fight to Survive / Mane Attraction
- B-side: "El Salvador" (1986); "Leave Me Alone" (1991)
- Released: February 5, 1986 (Japan); 1991 (US)
- Recorded: 1985/1991
- Genre: Heavy metal, glam metal
- Length: 3:33 (1985); 4:09 (1991)
- Label: Asylum Records (1985); Atlantic Records (1991)
- Songwriter(s): Mike Tramp, Vito Bratta
- Producer(s): Richie Zito

White Lion singles chronology
"Broken Heart" (1986)	"Wait" (1987)

White Lion singles chronology
"Lights and Thunder" (1991)	"Broken Heart" (1991)	"You're All I Need" (1992)

"Broken Heart" is the debut single from the hard rock band White Lion.

The song was originally from the band's debut album Fight to Survive released in 1985, but was later re-recorded and re-released as a single from the Mane Attraction album in 1991 which peaked at number 61 on the Billboard 200.

== Music video ==
The single featured the band's debut music video with drummer Greg D'Angelo and bassist Dave Spitz appearing in the video after replacing Nicki Capozzi and Felix Robinson. The 1991 re-recorded version featured a new music video.

== Compilations ==
The song along with the rest of the bands singles was featured on all of the bands major compilations including White Lion's 2020 compilation album, "'All You Need Is Rock 'N' Roll - The Complete Albums 1985-1991'".

== Track listing ==
=== 1986 single ===
1. "Broken Heart" - 3:33
2. "El Salvador" - 4:49

=== 1991 single ===
1. "Broken Heart '91" - 4:09
2. "Leave Me Alone" - 4:26

== Personnel ==
=== 1985 version ===
- Mike Tramp - vocals
- Vito Bratta - guitar
- Felix Robinson - bass, vocals
- Nicki Capozzi - drums

=== 1991 version ===
- Mike Tramp - vocals
- Vito Bratta - guitar
- James Lomenzo - bass
- Greg D'Angelo - drums

== In popular culture ==
On season 11 of American Idol, contestant Colton Dixon chose the song and covered it in the Idol's "Year They Were Born" feature. Colton Dixon was born in 1991.
