= Mane Attraction =

1991 studio album by White Lion

Studio album by White Lion
- Released: April 2, 1991
- Recorded: 1990–1991
- Genre: Glam metal
- Length: 63:45
- Label: Atlantic
- Producer: Richie Zito

White Lion chronology
Big Game (1989)	Mane Attraction (1991)	The Best of White Lion (1992)

Singles from Mane Attraction
- 1. "Lights and Thunder" Released: March 1991 (EU); 2. "Love Don't Come Easy" Released: April 1991 (Japan); 3. "Broken Heart '91" Released: 1991 (US); 4. "You're All I Need" Released: 1992

Professional ratings
Review scores
Source	Rating
AllMusic	3/5 stars

Mane Attraction is the fourth studio album by the glam metal band White Lion. It was released in 1991 by Atlantic Records, and reached No. 61 on the US Billboard 200 and No. 31 in the UK.

== Overview ==
After a year of writing and recording, White Lion released Mane Attraction in the spring of 1991, which was received well by the fans. Unfortunately, the album failed to reach the top 20 like the last two albums. The album featured the singles "Love Don't Come Easy" which peaked at number 24 on the Mainstream Rock chart, "Lights and Thunder", an eight-minute heavy rock epic with a complex structure inspired by Led Zeppelin's "Achilles Last Stand" and a re-recorded version of the band's debut single "Broken Heart", all of which had music videos. The song "Out with the Boys" was released as a rare promo single. The album also contained White Lion's only instrumental song, "Blue Monday", a tribute to Stevie Ray Vaughan, who had died while the band was writing for the album.

The album's power ballads "You're All I Need" which was released as a promo single, "Till Death Do Us Part" and "Farewell to You" gained a huge amount of radio airplay in Indonesia and the Philippines. Mike Tramp is married to Indonesian actress Ayu Azhari. "You're All I Need" also inspired Ahmad Dhani to create a song for Dewa 19 titled "Kangen".

A music video montage was released for the song "Farewell to You" which featured on the band's video album Escape from Brooklyn in 1992.

Greg D'Angelo and James Lomenzo left the band soon after the album's release, citing "musical differences", but White Lion carried on with bassist Tommy "T-Bone" Caradonna and drummer Jimmy DeGrasso (Megadeth, Alice Cooper, Suicidal Tendencies, Y&T). After briefly touring in support of Mane Attraction, Tramp and Bratta decided to call it a day, their last show being held in Boston at the Channel Club in September 1991.

== Track listing ==
All tracks written by Vito Bratta and Mike Tramp.

No.	Title	Length
1.	"Lights and Thunder"	8:10
2.	"Broken Heart"	4:09
3.	"Leave Me Alone"	4:26
4.	"Love Don't Come Easy"	4:11
5.	"You're All I Need"	4:29
6.	"It's Over"	5:19
7.	"Warsong"	6:59
8.	"She's Got Everything"	6:56
9.	"Till Death Do Us Part"	5:33
10.	"Out with the Boys"	4:35
11.	"Blue Monday"	4:23
12.	"Farewell to You"	4:22
Total length:		63:45

== Personnel ==
=== Band ===
- Mike Tramp – lead vocals, rhythm guitar
- Vito Bratta – lead guitar, backing vocals
- James LoMenzo – bass, backing vocals
- Greg D'Angelo – drums

=== Touring members ===
- Tommy T-Bone Caradonna – bass
- Jimmy DeGrasso – drums

=== Production ===
- Produced by Richie Zito
- Mastered by George Marino at Sterling Sound, NYC

== Charts ==
Chart (1991)	Peak position
Finnish Albums (The Official Finnish Charts)	225
German Albums (Offizielle Top 100)	35
Swedish Albums (Sverigetopplistan)	23
Swiss Albums (Schweizer Hitparade)	11
UK Albums (Official Charts)	31
US Billboard 200	61

== Escape from Brooklyn ==
Escape from Brooklyn

Video by White Lion
- Released: 1992
- Genre: Hard rock
- Length: 75 mins
- Label: Atlantic

Escape from Brooklyn is a VHS/DVD video album by the American/Danish hard rock band White Lion, released in 1992. The video features all of the band's music videos to this point and also features behind the scenes footage, interviews with band members and a look at the band's most recent World tour in support of their fourth studio album Mane Attraction.

=== Track listing ===
1. "Broken Heart"
2. "Wait"
3. "Tell Me"
4. "When the Children Cry"
5. "Little Fighter"
6. "Radar Love"
7. "Cry for Freedom"
8. "Sweet Little Lovin'" - Live
9. "Love Don't Come Easy"
10. "Broken Heart '91"
11. "Farewell to You"

=== Personnel ===
- Mike Tramp - vocals
- Vito Bratta - guitars
- Tommy T-Bone Caradonna - bass guitar
- Jimmy DeGrasso - drums

Additional:

- James LoMenzo - bass guitar
- Greg D'Angelo - drums
