= Big Game (album) =

Studio album by White Lion
- Released: June 5, 1989
- Recorded: 1989
- Genre: Glam metal
- Length: 53:05
- Label: Atlantic
- Producer: Michael Wagener

White Lion chronology
Pride (1987)	Big Game (1989)	Mane Attraction (1991)

Singles from Big Game
- 1. "Little Fighter" Released: June 1989; 2. "Radar Love" Released: September 1989; 3. "Goin' Home Tonight" Released: September 1989 (Germany); 4. "Cry for Freedom" Released: February 1990

Professional ratings
Review scores
Source	Rating
AllMusic	4.5/5 stars

Big Game is the third studio album by the American glam metal band White Lion. It was released on June 5, 1989, by Atlantic Records, reaching #19 on The Billboard 200 album chart, #28 in Canada and #47 In the UK. The album contains the MTV hits, "Little Fighter", "Radar Love" and "Cry for Freedom". This album has a lighter sound than previous albums.

== Overview ==
In the first half of 1989, still riding high on the multi platinum success of Pride, White Lion re-entered the studio following the completion of their Pride tour to record the next album, a decision the group later came to regret due to the effects of fatigue from the heavy touring. A musically eclectic follow-up to Pride, the album featured the single "Little Fighter", in Memory of The Rainbow Warrior, a Greenpeace boat which was intentionally sabotaged and sunk by the French Secret Service while docked in an Auckland harbour, New Zealand in 1985 and served as the inspiration for the Steven Seagal film On Deadly Ground. In 1989, a fundraising double album was released entitled "Greenpeace Rainbow Warriors". A cover of Golden Earring's "Radar Love" was released as the second single, followed by "Cry for Freedom" a political song about apartheid in South Africa and was one of many songs from the band that addressed social or political issues such as uprising to oppression. "Goin' Home Tonight" was also released as a single.

All of the singles featured music videos and the album quickly went gold, peaking at #19 on the US album charts and charting very well around the world. Following the album's release the band continued touring with Ozzy Osbourne in US, and later in the fall of 1989 they had their own headline tour in Europe.

Mike Tramp has later told in interviews that he thinks the album was "half-finished". He and guitarist Vito Bratta wrote the album over two weeks in a Palm Springs hotel room and soon recorded the album quickly. It was a decision they have regretted, but they were inexperienced and felt pressure from the record company at that point.

== Track listing ==
All tracks are written by Bratta/Tramp except "Radar Love" by George Kooymans/Barry Hay.

No.	Title	Length
1.	"Goin' Home Tonight"	4:57
2.	"Dirty Woman"	3:27
3.	"Little Fighter"	4:23
4.	"Broken Home"	4:59
5.	"Baby Be Mine"	4:10
6.	"Living on the Edge"	5:02
7.	"Let's Get Crazy"	4:52
8.	"Don't Say It's Over"	4:04
9.	"If My Mind Is Evil"	4:56
10.	"Radar Love" (Golden Earring cover)	5:59
11.	"Cry for Freedom"	6:09
Total length:		53:05

=== Rock Candy reissue bonus tracks ===
No.	Title	Length
12.	"Wait" (Live on Westwood One)	3:48
13.	"All Join Our Hands" (Live on Westwood One)	4:00
14.	"When the Children Cry" (Live in rehearsal)	4:42
Total length:		65:35

=== HNE Recordings 2020 box set bonus tracks ===
No.	Title	Length
12.	"Cry for Freedom" (Edit)	4:17
Total length:		57:22

== Personnel ==
- Mike Tramp – lead vocals, rhythm guitar
- Vito Bratta – lead guitar, backing vocals
- James LoMenzo – bass, backing vocals
- Greg D'Angelo – drums

== Charts ==
=== Weekly charts ===
Chart (1989)	Peak position
Australian Albums (ARIA)	119
Canada Top Albums/CDs (RPM)	28
Dutch Albums (Album Top 100)	88
Finnish Albums (The Official Finnish Charts)	21
German Albums (Offizielle Top 100)	38
Norwegian Albums (VG-lista)	14
Swedish Albums (Sverigetopplistan)	13
Swiss Albums (Schweizer Hitparade)	16
UK Albums (Official Charts)	47
US Billboard 200	19

=== Year-end charts ===
Chart (1989)	Position
US Billboard 200	74

== Certifications ==
Region	Certification	Certified units/sales
United States (RIAA)	Gold	500,000^{^}
^{^} Shipments figures based on certification alone.
