= Sergeant Steel =

Austrian rock band

- Origin: Kronstorf, Upper Austria, Austria
- Genres: Hard rock
- Years active: 2007–present
- Label: Boyz Tyme
- Members: Phil Vanderkill; Jack Power; Chuck Boom; Ben Bateman; Ronny Roxx; Kenny King
- Past members: Cosy Coxx
- Website: sergeant-steel.com

Sergeant Steel is a hard rock band from Austria, which was found by guitar player Jack Power, singer Phil Vanderkill and bass player Cosy Coxx in 2007. Sergeant Steel plays traditional hard rock music, which is ingrained in the 1970s and 1980s, in the vein of bands like Queen, Bon Jovi, Aerosmith, Judas Priest, Rainbow and Deep Purple.

== History ==
=== Early years (2007-2009) ===
Jack Power, Phil Vanderkill and Cosy Coxx founded Sergeant Steel in October 2007. The trio started to look for a drummer and a second guitar player. Phil and Chuck Boom got in touch in early 2008. They talked about their common past in miscellaneous bands and projects. Chuck admitted that he wanted to go in a musically heavier direction again, after years in the field of jazz and pop music. After a meeting at Jack's apartment, Sergeant Steel became a foursome. At the same time Cosy got in contact with his cousin Kenny King. Demonstrating a distinctive interest in Queen, King seized to opportunity to join Sergeant Steel. The band played their first live show in August 2008.

=== Lovers and Maniacs (2010-2011) ===
Keyboard/piano player Ben Bateman joined Sergeant Steel in the fall of 2009. Their debut album Lovers and Maniacs, produced and mixed by Jack Power, was then sent to the United States of America. The record was mastered by Beau Hill in Los Angeles.

In March 2010, Sergeant Steel released Lovers and Maniacs successfully on their own. The album was critically acclaimed by international music press such as Metal Hammer Germany (who named it "Demo of the Month" in their October 2010 issue), Rock Hard Germany, Heavy Magazine Germany, Sleaze Roxx Canada, and others. Ronny Roxx succeeded Cosy Coxx on bass guitar. Cosy left the band on good terms for personal reasons. Sergeant Steel signed a record deal with Refused Records in 2011. Lovers and Maniacs was officially re-released worldwide in 2011.

=== Men on a Mission (2012–present) ===
At the start of 2012, Sergeant Steel met producer/mixer Michael Wagener in Nashville, Tennessee, in the United States. Wagener mixed and mastered their second album. The band promoted the trip with an exclusive music video "Heaven Misses An Angel".

In February 2013, Sergeant Steel released the single "Black Wings Comin'". It is the official anthem of the EHC Black Wings Linz ice-hockey club (winner of Austrian hockey-championships 2003 & 2012). "Black Wings Comin'" was mastered by Peter Mew (The Beatles, Pink Floyd, Deep Purple, etc.) at Abbey Road Studios in London, United Kingdom. The group played support shows for legendary rock bands like Deep Purple and Sweet. Around that time, they released an extended play called Clam Rocks, including excerpts from their then-unreleased second album Men on a Mission. In September, Sergeant Steel released their second record Men on a Mission and two videos via Boyz Tyme Records.

== Discography ==
=== Albums ===
- 2009: Lovers & Maniacs (2009: self-released, 2010: Refused Records)
- 2013: Men on a Mission (Boyz Tyme Records)
- 2015: Riders of the Worm (Boyz Tyme Records)
- 2021: Truck Tales

=== EPs ===
- 2013: Clam Rocks (limited EP)

=== Singles ===
- 2012: Heaven Misses an Angel
- 2013: Black Wings Comin'
- 2013: Cry Out Your Heart, Baby!
- 2013: Sweet 16 (Promotional Single, Boyz Tyme Records)
- 2015: Dirty Habits (Download, Boyz Tyme Records)
- 2016: Winter Wonderland (CD & Download, Boyz Tyme Records)
- 2020: Fight Fire With Fire (Download, Boyz Tyme Records)
- 2021: Hunter (Download, Boyz Tyme Records)
- 2021: Nightmare (Download, Boyz Tyme Records)
- 2021: Vodoo Queen (Download, Boyz Tyme Records)
- 2021: Backseat Lover (Download, Boyz Tyme Records)
- 2023: Please Me, Tease Me (Download, Metalapolis Records)
- 2023: Mama Didn'Raise No Fool (Download, Metalapolis Records)
- 2023: Alive (Download, Metalapolis Records)
- 2023: Down To Mississippi (Download, Metalapolis Records)
