= More to Life Than This =

Studio album by Mike Tramp
- Released: 17 March 2003
- Genre: Hard rock, melodic rock
- Label: Ulftone

Mike Tramp chronology
Recovering the Wasted Years (2002)	More to Life Than This (2003)	Rock 'N' Roll Alive (2003)

Singles from More to Life Than This
- 1. "More to Life Than This" Released: 2003; 2. "Don't Want to Say Goodnight" Released: 2003

More to Life Than This is the third solo album by former White Lion and Freak of Nature lead singer, Mike Tramp, released on March 17, 2003.

== Background and recording ==
The album was recorded in Copenhagen, Tramp once again produced the album himself but relied on producer/engineer Flemming Rasmussen (Metallica) to engineer and mix the sessions in his own Sweet Silence Studios.

Following a guest appearance on Tramp's last solo album, Recovering the Wasted Years, Oliver Steffenson, a lifelong friend of Tramp who was involved with the very early stages of White Lion and also with Tramp formed Freak of Nature, joins Tramp's solo band.

== Release and promotion ==
The album's title track and "Don't Want to Say Good Night" were released as singles off the album. A music video made in Australia was released for the song "Lay Down My Life for You".

Following the release of the album, Tramp continued his attempt to reform the original White Lion line up, but by the end of 2003 had given up on the reunion and moved on with a new White Lion line up in 2004.

== Track listing ==
No.	Title	Length
1.	"More to Life Than This"	6:11
2.	"Lay Down My Life for You"	3:32
3.	"Don't Want to Say Good Night"	4:11
4.	"Nothing at All"	4:27
5.	"Day by Day"	5:28
6.	"Live for Today"	4:10
7.	"Back from the Dead"	4:18
8.	"I Won't Let Go"	4:09
9.	"Goodbye Song"	3:56
10.	"The Good, the Sad and the Ugly"	6:21

== Personnel ==
- Mike Tramp – vocals, electric guitar, acoustic guitar
- Oliver Steffensen – Guitar
- Kasper Damgaard – guitar
- Claus Langeskov – bass guitar
- Kasper Foss – drums
- Dan Hemmer – Hammond B-3

Additional musicians

- Todd Wolfe – guitar
- Steve Lukather – guitar solo on track 8
- Eric Johnson – Guitar solo on track 10
- Nicholas Findsen – bass guitar
