= Fight to Survive =

Studio album by White Lion
- Released: January 21, 1986 (Japan)
- Recorded: February 1984
- Studio: Hotline (Frankfurt, Germany)
- Genre: Heavy metal; glam metal
- Length: 44:32
- Label: Victor
- Producer: Peter Hauke

White Lion chronology
Fight to Survive (1986)	Pride (1987)

Singles from Fight to Survive
- 1. "Broken Heart" Released: February 5, 1986 (Japan)

Professional ratings
Review scores
Source	Rating
AllMusic	2/5 stars
Sputnikmusic	4/5
Rock Hard	8.5/10

Fight to Survive is the debut studio album by the American glam metal band White Lion, released on January 21, 1986, by Victor Records. The album charted at No. 151 on the Billboard 200 chart in 1988, after the success of their second studio album, Pride.

== Background ==
The band was signed to Elektra Records, which shelved the album with no intention of publishing it in the US. Philadelphia-based Grand Slamm Records bought the album from Elektra and released it in America the following year. Vocalist and rhythm guitarist Mike Tramp has noted that once White Lion was dropped by Elektra Records, their manager managed to get the right to license the album and release it in Japan.

The song "Broken Heart" was released as the band's debut single and featured a music video with drummer Greg D'Angelo and bassist Dave Spitz appearing in the video and it was recorded on stage at L'Amour in Brooklyn. The track was re-recorded and updated for the band's 1991 release, Mane Attraction, and featured a new music video. "El Salvador" was released as a promo single.

== Track listing ==
All songs written by Mike Tramp & Vito Bratta, except where noted.

No.	Title	Writer(s)	Length
1.	"Broken Heart"		3:33
2.	"Cherokee"		4:56
3.	"Fight to Survive"	Tramp, Bratta, Nicky Capozzi	5:14
4.	"Where Do We Run"	Tramp, Bratta, Felix Robinson	3:29
5.	"In the City"	Tramp, Bratta, Capozzi, Robinson	4:39
6.	"All the Fallen Men"		4:53
7.	"All Burn in Hell"	Tramp, Bratta, Capozzi	4:21
8.	"Kid of 1000 Faces"	Tramp, Bratta, Capozzi, Robinson	4:02
9.	"El Salvador"		4:49
10.	"The Road to Valhalla"		4:30
Total length:			44:32

Some earlier remastered versions of the album feature several live bonus tracks. However, these were recorded during the Pride tour by the band's classic lineup, quite some time after this album. Fight To Survive was re-released in 2014 by Rock Candy Records in a special deluxe collector's edition with fully remastered sound shaped from 24 bit digital technology. The package contains a 12-page full color booklet, 3,500 word essay, enhanced artwork, rare photos and a new interview with vocalist Mike Tramp.

== Personnel ==
White Lion

- Mike Tramp – vocals, rhythm guitar
- Vito Bratta – lead guitar
- Felix Robinson – bass, keyboards
- Nicky Capozzi – drums

Additional personnel

- James LoMenzo – bass (member at time of album release, listed as band member in album credits)
- Greg D'Angelo – drums (member at time of album release, listed as band member in album credits)
- Harry Baierl – piano
- Roderiich Gold – keyboards

Production

- Caroline Greyshock – cover photo

== Charts ==
Chart (1988)	Peak position
US Billboard 200	151
