= Obszön Geschöpf =

Obszön Geschöpf (also known as OG) is a French musical project created by Remzi Kelleci in 1996/97 in Boulogne-sur-Mer, France.

== History ==
Kelleci recorded a first demo CD in 2000 called Day of Suffering, which was released on the French La Chambre Froide label, which also released Yell of Fright in 2003. Son of Evil was released by the American label BLC Productions. In autumn 2005, OG released Tomb of The Dead.

Kelleci manages the band himself under the name of Mortuary Records. After putting together a live line-up, OG played in several European cities in 2009 and released their fourth album, Erection Body Mutilated on BLC Productions in late 2009. The album is two discs, with the second made up of remixes of the songs on the first.

In spring 2010, OG signed a deal with the German Metal label to release their fifth album, Symphony of Decay, which was released in summer 2010. The album was produced by Andy Classen at State One Studio. The album includes remixes from Skrew and Richard Thomas of Ventana and Mushroomhead. OG toured the United States in March 2011 to promote Symphony of Decay.

== Musical style ==
OG's first releases were pure dark electro/EBM, and only on Tomb of the Dead and albums afterwards did he began incorporating heavy metal music into his sound, using heavy metal, industrial metal, and most recently, thrash metal. OG describes its sound as a mix between metal bands such as Slayer, Pantera, Exhorder, Dark Angel, and Exodus and industrial metal bands such as Nine Inch Nails, Fear Factory, White Zombie, Die Krupps, KMFDM, Slipknot, and Clawfinger.

== Discography ==
Demo

- 2000 - Day of Suffering

Studio albums'

- 2003 - Yell of Fright
- 2004 - Son of Evil
- 2005 - Tomb of the Dead
- 2009 - Erection Body Mutilated (Back From the Dead)
- 2010 - Symphony of Decay
- 2013 - Highway of Horrors
- 2015 - The Vault of Nightmares
