= Mike Tramp =

Danish musician and singer (born 1961)

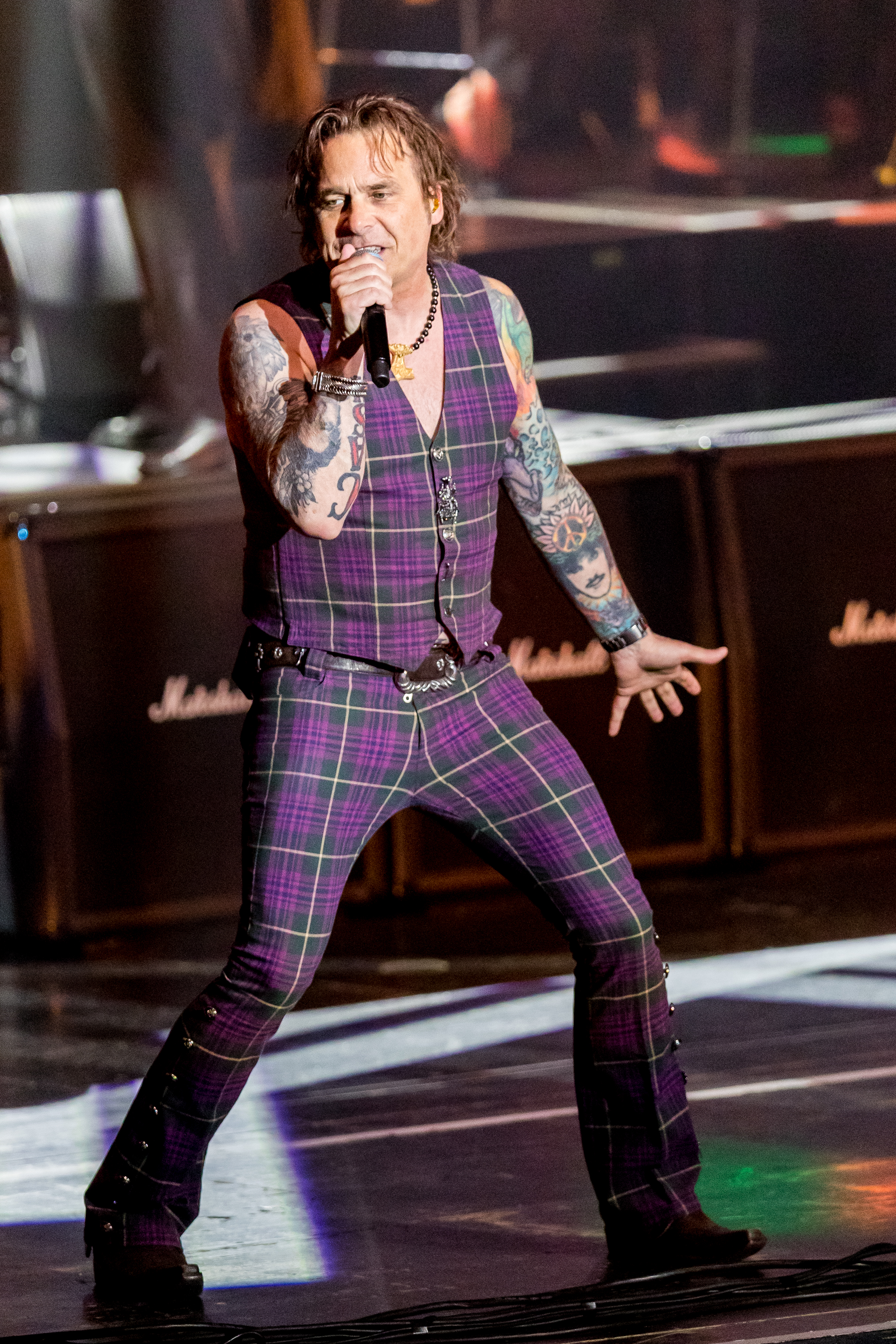
- Tramp performing in 2023

Background information
- Also known as: Mike Tramp
- Born: Michael Trempenau; 14 January 1961 (age 65); Copenhagen, Denmark
- Genres: Hard rock; glam metal; pop rock
- Occupations: Musician; singer; songwriter
- Years active: 1976–present
- Member of: White Lion
- Formerly of: Mabel, Studs, Danish Lions, Freak of Nature
- Spouses: Fleur Thiemeyer (m. 1987–2002); Ayu Azhari (m. 2004)
- Website: miketrampofficial.com

Michael Trempenau (born 14 January 1961), better known as Mike Tramp, is a Danish musician and singer, best known for his work with the glam metal band White Lion. In 1996, he launched his solo career, interrupted from 2004 to 2009 when he briefly reformed White Lion. Since then, he has regularly released solo albums and toured extensively. Since 2023, he has released "Songs of White Lion" albums and toured as Mike Tramp's White Lion with guitarist Marcus Nand and band. Danish solo albums have also been released since 2022.

== Biography ==
=== 1976–1982: Early years ===
Mike Trempenau was born and raised in Vesterbro, Copenhagen, with his mother, Doris, and two brothers, Dennis and Kim. He started his musical career singing in Vesterbro Ungdomsgård, a youth group club in Copenhagen, and appears on their first album: Vi lever på Vesterbro (1974). In 1976, Trempenau, now known professionally as Mike Tramp, joined the pop band Mabel as the lead singer. Mabel released five studio albums and were very popular in Denmark and Spain, with Tramp receiving "teen idol" status. In 1978, Mabel won the Danish Song Contest with the song "Boom Boom" and represented Denmark in the Eurovision Song Contest 1978 that same year. Later, Mabel moved to Spain. Following and advice given to Tramp by Barón Rojo, he decided to start playing hard rock. So, Mabel became Studs, releasing a debut self-titled album in 1981 and then moved to New York City and became Danish Lions in 1982. After recording demos, the band returned home to Denmark, however, Tramp decided to remain in America.

=== 1983–1991: White Lion ===
Tramp met Vito Bratta and formed White Lion in 1983, the band became very successful in the mid-1980s to early 1990s. White Lion released their debut album, Fight to Survive, in 1985. The band achieved success with their number 8 hit "Wait" and number 3 hit "When the Children Cry" from their second album, the triple-platinum selling Pride. The band enjoyed continued success with their third album, Big Game, which achieved gold status, and their fourth album, Mane Attraction, which they supported with a tour. White Lion disbanded in 1991; their first compilation album, The Best of White Lion, was released not long after.

=== 1992–1995: Freak of Nature ===
After White Lion, Tramp went on to form the hard rock band Freak of Nature. The follow-up was significantly darker and harder than White Lion. The band released three albums between 1993 and 1998: Freak of Nature, Gathering of Freaks, and Outcasts. The band shared stages with Helloween and Dio in Europe in 1993. Freak of Nature disbanded in 1995.

=== 1996–2004: Solo career ===
Following Freak of Nature, Tramp began a solo career, releasing his debut album as a solo artist in 1998 titled Capricorn. The album featured former Freak of Nature bandmates, guitarist Kenny Korade and bass player Jerry Best. Former White Lion bass guitarist James LoMenzo performed backing vocals on the album. The song "Better Off" was released as Tramp's debut solo single and features his first solo music video. The album also features the singles "Already Gone", "If I Live Tomorrow", and "Take a Little Time".

It would be five years before Tramp returned to the studio to record his follow-up album, Recovering the Wasted Years, during which time he would move to Australia, with the aim of raising his son away from the rigors of big city life and to plan his next career move. Recovering the Wasted Years was released in 2002 and featured the singles "Living a Lie" and "Endless Highway" both featuring live music videos. "Do It All Over" was released as a promo single.

In 2003, Tramp followed-up with his third album, More to Life Than This, which he once again produced himself but relied on producer/engineer Flemming Rasmussen (Metallica) to engineer and mix the sessions in his very own Sweet Silence Studios. The album's title track, "More to Life Than This", and "Don't Want to Say Good Night" were both released as singles. A music video made in Australia was released for the song "Lay Down My Life for You". Also in 2003, Tramp released the double-disc live album Rock 'N' Roll Alive, which features Tramp performing live versions of songs from White Lion, Freak of Nature, and his solo albums.

In 2004, Tramp released the solo album Songs I Left Behind.

=== 2004–2008: Reforming White Lion ===
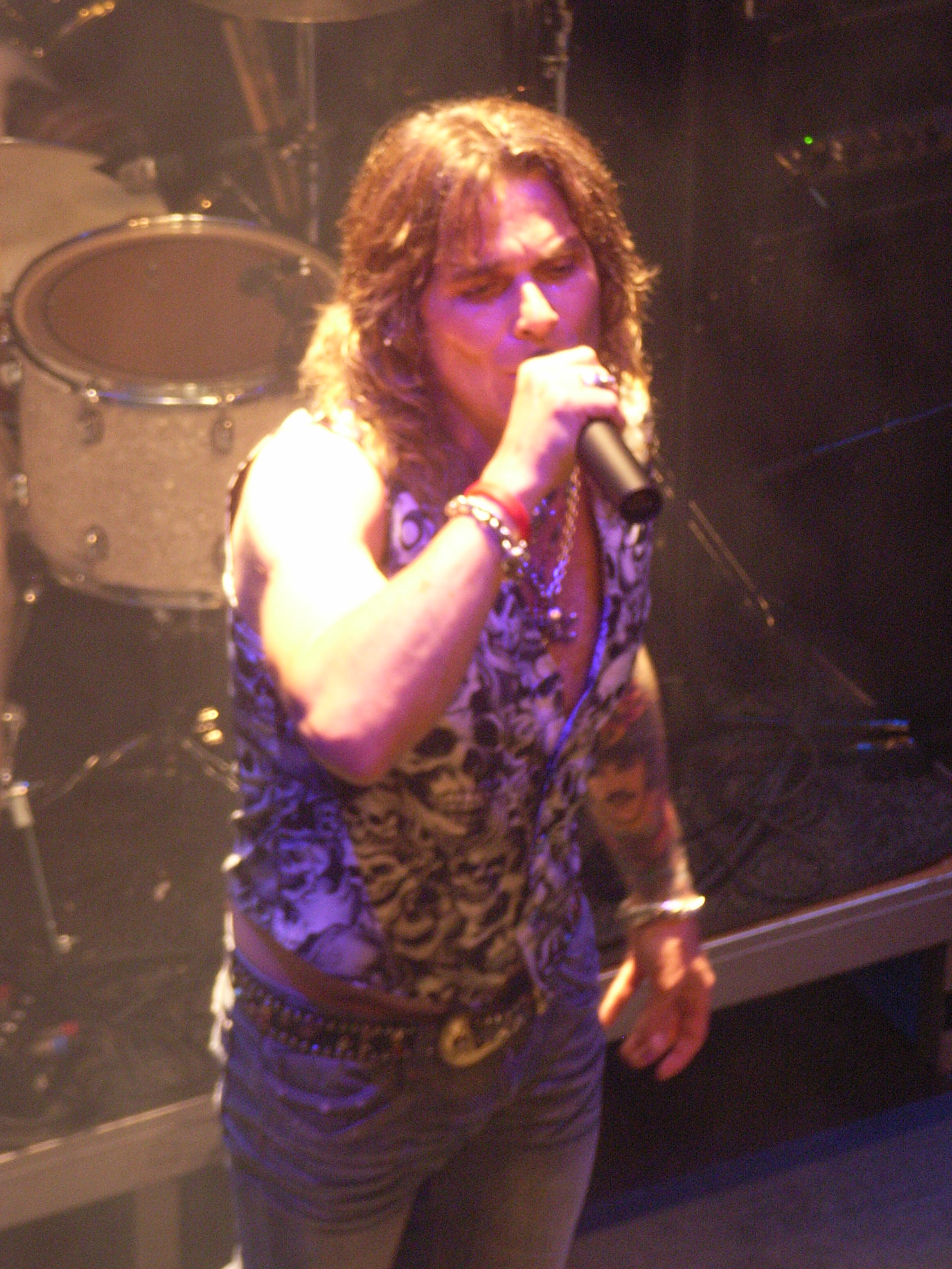
Mike Tramp in 2008

Tramp also reformed White Lion with a new lineup under the name "Tramp's White Lion" (aka White Lion II, later only White Lion) due to legal issues with former members. The band played and re-recorded White Lion songs touring and releasing the album Last Roar which featured new re-recorded versions of White Lion classic tracks and a boxset titled "The Bootleg Series" in 2004, followed by a double-live CD entitled Rocking the USA in 2005.

In 2006, Tramp's White Lion toured Europe in November and December with British band Crimes of Passion. In 2007 a White Lion compilation The Definitive Rock Collection was released and the band was set for a summer tour with Poison and Ratt only to be dropped by the tour promoter after ex-White Lion guitarist Vito Bratta threatened to take legal action over the band name. Eventually, Tramp was able to use the original band name again.

White Lion recorded a new studio album called Return of the Pride, which was released on 14 March 2008. The band was now once again simply known as White Lion.

=== 2009–2011: The Rock 'N' Roll Circuz ===
Following the release of Return of the Pride, Tramp faced a tumultuous time of professional indecision as he tried to decide between continuing his solo career or pouring his energy into White Lion. In October 2009, Tramp released a new solo studio album titled Mike Tramp & The Rock 'N' Roll Circuz, which was also now the name of his solo band. The album was initially intended to be the next new White Lion album but a new solo band was formed instead. The album peaked at number 16 on the Danish top 40 Hitlisten albums chart on 16 October 2009. The album features the singles "All of My Life" and "Come On", for which a music video was also made.

In April 2011, Tramp released the solo album Stand Your Ground featuring the singles "Distance" and "Hymn to Ronnie", a tribute song to former Heaven & Hell and Black Sabbath vocalist Ronnie James Dio, who died on 16 May 2010 after a six-month-long battle with stomach cancer.

=== 2012–2014: Solo career: Acoustic ===
In 2012, Tramp began recording another solo album. The result, Cobblestone Street, was released on 8 April 2013 on Target Records following a successful acoustic tour of Europe in autumn 2012. During the tour, Tramp traveled across Europe playing 40 shows, while driving and doing everything by himself. The album reached number 21 on the Danish Hitlisten albums chart and features the first single "New Day" which was released on 18 February 2013. The track "Revolution" was released as the second single for the album. In March 2013, Tramp supported Beth Hart for several concerts in France. To support Cobblestone Street, Tramp toured Europe, including France, Switzerland, Spain, Denmark, Sweden, Norway, Germany, Belgium, Holland, Turkey and the UK. The tour ended at Le Forum in Vaureal.

Tramp embarked on a US tour and his first ever acoustic tour of the country in summer 2013.

While promoting his solo album, Tramp announced in several interviews that there would no longer be a White Lion of any kind, including the new White Lion or any possible reunions.

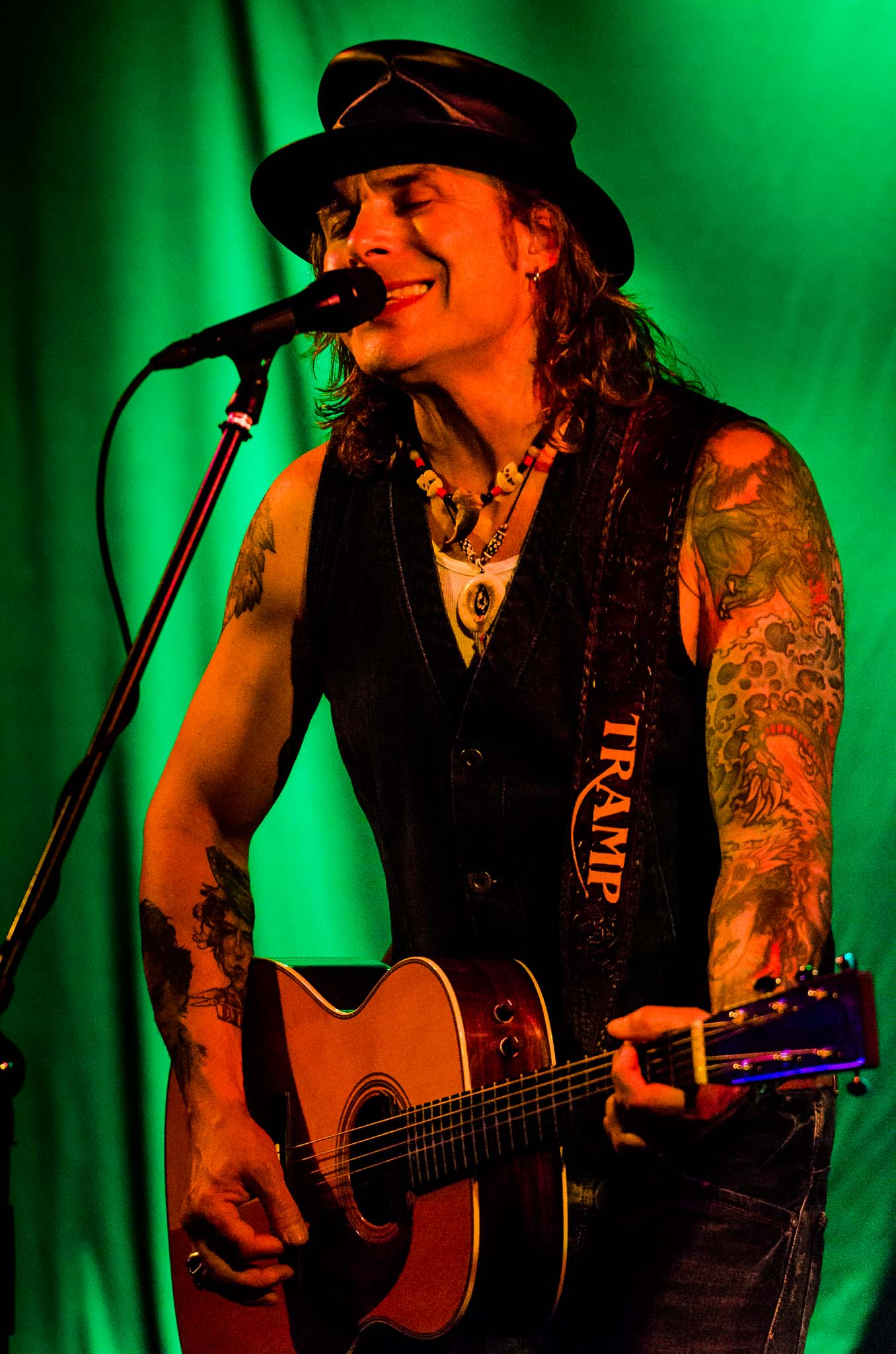
Mike Tramp in Idaho Falls, ID (2013 – B2X Photo)

To wrap up 2013, Tramp released the Christmas single "The Way It Was Before" which is a more serious track compared to most other festive songs. The single was also inspired by events from 9/11 was released in Europe via Target Records on 11 November.

Tramp announced his return to the US for the spring of 2014. The tour started on 19 March in Hollywood, California at the Whisky A Go Go and continued into May. The tour also included an extended stay on the Monsters Of Rock Cruise 2014 in front of a big crowd.

In June 2014, Tramp released the single "Trust in Yourself" featuring a music video directed by his son Dylan. The song is the first single from his upcoming new solo album "Museum".

The album Museum was released on 18 August 2014 and follows the musical steps of his last album "Cobblestone Street". The album charted on the Danish Hitlisten albums chart at number 3. The song "Freedom" was released as the second single from the album.

Tramp gave four release concerts at the Zeppelin Bar, Café and Venue in Copenhagen. The four concerts took place on 14–17 August. All the concerts were completely sold out. Tramp delivered performances with special themes and different set list every night to a dedicated crowd.

On 22 August 2014, Tramp started his extensive European tour playing shows in Germany, Belgium, the Netherlands, and the UK. The last concert of the European tour was at the Bremen Theater in Copenhagen which was a trio show.

=== 2015–2019: Band of Brothers ===
In February 2015, Tramp signed a worldwide album deal with Target Records, with the announcement his next album would be released in August. Tramp also confirmed that there would be no more White Lion. Also in February 2015, Tramp played two concerts in Russia for the first time ever.

In March 2015, Tramp confirmed he was at work on the follow-up to 2014's Museum. He also stated that the material would be classic rock, more akin to his 1997 debut Capricorn, without the acoustic elements that featured in his recent output. He revealed a return to a full-band lineup working with longtime producer, engineer and guitarist Soren Andersen, their Rock'n'Roll Circus drummer Morten Hellborn, keyboardist Morten Buchholz and bassist Jesper Haugaard. The album was said to be released in August.

After the highly successful US tour earlier in 2014, Tramp embarked on another intimate acoustic solo tour across the US in the spring of 2015 and for the first time visited Canada as well. Tramp played on the Monsters of Rock Cruise and the Monsters of Rock Hangover Cruise.

Tramp announced that his studio album Nomad would be released internationally on 28 August 2015. He stated: "Each previous album gave me the freedom to follow the songs wherever they wanted to go, and with 'Nomad' my vision was clear as a bell, once again I just had to be who I am."

In July 2015, Tramp released the single "High Like a Mountain" and in August Tramp released the radio single and music video "Give It All You Got". The video was filmed and edited in Copenhagen, with both tracks taken from his album Nomad.

Nomad was released on 28 August 2015 via Target Records. The album reached number 21 on the Danish Hitlisten albums chart. Following the album, Tramp embarked with the young Danish band Lucer on a European tour in the late summer, visiting Denmark, Germany, Sweden, England, Netherlands, Belgium, Northern Ireland, Ireland, Scotland, Wales, France and Switzerland. The tour ended at the night on fire festival in Karlsruhe.

In 2016, Tramp announced several solo and band shows in Denmark where the Danish band Lucer played for him as a support band and as Tramp's background band. In March 2016, Tramp played a benefit show for people with cancer in Lingen, Germany.

In May 2016, following up on Nomad's success and the award for Classic Rock Album of the Year at the High Voltage Rock Awards, Tramp released the single "Stay", which like previous singles was played heavily on Danish national radio. "Stay" was released with a video that shows Tramp in total isolation, living the life of a forest worker in the Scandinavian woods.

On 13 May, Tramp played on Nordic Noise Festival in Denmark. Esbjerg Rock Festival, Sweden Rock Festival and Väsby Rock Festival will follow in 2016. In the summer of 2016, Tramp toured in the US delivering an acoustic tour to promote his album "Nomad". He also took part at the Monster of Rock Cruise in October.

In October 2016, Tramp announced his 10th solo album, titled Maybe Tomorrow, a follow-up to his most successful and highest-selling solo album Nomad from 2015.

The album Maybe Tomorrow was released worldwide on 24 February 2017, through Target Records.

In January 2017, Tramp launched a music video for the single "Coming Home", a track from his album Maybe Tomorrow. The video was filmed and edited by Kennie Østed. In February 2017, the song "Would I Lie to You" was released as the second single followed by the third single "Spring" released in May 2017.

Tramp and his "Band of Brothers", including Soren Andersen, Claus Langeskov and Kenny Andy, began a tour in March 2017 after three sold-out concerts in Roskilde and Copenhagen for the release of Maybe Tomorrow, also playing to French, Italian and Irish audiences. The tour is also set to visit Germany, Belgium, UK, and France.

Tramp topped the Danish album sales charts with Maybe Tomorrow, which entered at No. 1 on the vinyl chart and No. 2 on the physical album chart.

In September 2017, Tramp released a music video for a new single titled "Work It All Out" from his upcoming new box set This & That (But A Whole Lot More), which will be released via Mighty Music / Target Group on 1 December 2017.

In February 2018, Tramp provided lead vocals to a friend's project based in Indonesia for the single "One More Chance" which also features a music video.

Tramp toured Europe, Netherlands and Italy in the Spring of 2018 with his Band of Brothers. After that some tour dates followed in May. In October 2018, Tramp announced that he's been working on a new album released in 2019. To add, he played some Denmark shows with his acoustic guitar in between. On 1 November, Tramp's first solo album "Capricorn" was re-released as a special vinyl version. He also performed 2 shows in Zeppelin Bar, Copenhagen to celebrate that.

On 8 January 2019, Tramp announced that his new solo album titled Stray From The Flock would be released on 1 March. Tramp's record company Target Records made the following statement:

With 100+ shows planned in 2019 to support the new album – starting off in the US in February and March with 22 shows – and a first single, titled "Dead End Ride", ready to drop on 25 January (together with a top-notch video), this will be another great year for Mike Tramp.

On 25 January, Tramp released the song/video "Dead End Ride" as a first single of the new album. The song went No. 1 on iTunes in Peru the next day.

Stray From The Flock was officially released on 1 March 2019 through Mighty Music/Target Records. A second single "Homesick" was released on 29 March and Tramp also released a third single "Best Days Of My Life". The song, also available as a lyric video, was released in connection with his extensive European tour in the Fall of 2019.

In 2019, Tramp toured the US from February to March, the UK in April, summer festivals in Denmark, The "Dos Amigos Tour" in September with Marcus Nand on Lead Guitar throughout Denmark, Belgium, France and Spain, and a tour in October with his "Band of Brothers".

=== 2020–2022 ===
On 1 May 2020, Tramp released the album "Second Time Around" through Target Records. The album consists of ten brand new re-recordings from his 2009 album, "The Rock 'N' Roll Circuz". The new versions were produced by Tramp and Soren Anderson at Medley studios in Copenhagen.

"The Road" which also featured a new music video and "Between Good and Bad (radio single)" were both released as singles in advance. The new version of "When She Cries" was also released as a single following the album's official release, the song was dedicated to his daughter.

Tramp planned to embark on an extensive North American tour in 2020 together with Marcus Nand. The "Songs of White Lion" tour had to be cancelled due to Covid.

In 2020 Tramp celebrated 25 years as a solo artist with the release of the album: "Trampthology" on 18 December 2020. The new album from Tramp will be released on a double gatefold 180-gram vinyl and double CD. The compilation will feature 16 hits from his solo career plus four new songs including the single "Take Me Away" featuring a lyric video.

In February 2021, Tramp released a brand new single, "Everything Is Alright", as his entry into the Eurovision Song Contest representing Denmark. The song is up against seven other entries, and the winner will be chosen at the Dansk Melodi Grand Prix on 6 March. The Eurovision Song Contest finals will take place in Rotterdam, Netherlands in May. Tramp also released the official music video for "Everything Is Alright" on 18 February 2021 and another compilation album also titled "Everything Is Alright" in May 2021 featuring the single plus the nine best tracks from Trampthology on a single disc release.

In the new year 2022, Tramp released a new single, "You Only Get To Do It Once", on 7 January. An autobiographic reflection the song was created exclusively for Trampthology.com, the website was closed later on.

In September 2022, Tramp for the first time in his career released a full set of songs sung entirely in Danish on his new album "For Første Gang" followed by danish tour in fall. The album features music videos for the three singles released: "Min By", "For Første Gang For Altid" and "Vejkort".

In October, Tramp announced he would be touring Europe and the US in 2023 and released another single, "What You Got Left", featuring a video directed by his son. The song features ex White Lion Bassist James Lomenzo.

=== 2023: Songs of White Lion ===
In 2023, Tramp announced bringing his version of White Lion back with the upcoming release of Songs of White Lion, via Frontiers Music Srl on 14 April 2023. As the title implies, the new album sees Tramp re-imagining select cuts from White Lion's catalog. A re-recorded "Cry for Freedom" was released as the first single, followed by a reworked take on "Little Fighter".

Tramp announced a US tour from May to June with guitarist Marcus Nand who is also the guitar player on Songs of White Lion. Tramp also played many summer festivals in Europe with full band including Sweden Rock Festival, Zurbarán Rock Burgos, Leyendas Del Rock, Jailbreak Festival, Bandit Rock Festival, Paddy Rock Festival, Indoor Summer Festival in Hamburg and Raismes Fest in France. Followed by a tour in UK with Marcus Nand.
The Europe dates also included a concert at the Matrix in Bochum, Germany.

After the European dates another US full band tour was announced from September to October. Tramp also supported 'Accept (band)' on the Hamburg and Köln dates in December, leading to the final date in Amager Bio in Copenhagen.

=== 2024: Songs of White Lion Vol II ===
On 15 March 2024, Tramp released his second Danish album, Mand Af En Tid. As a first single "Hvis Du Vil" was already released in 2023, followed by "Ham Vi Vill Være" and "Mand Af En Tid" in early 2024. The second and third single featured a music video. As with "For Første Gang", all the songs on "Mand Af En Tid" were written together with Lars Daneskov, and the record was produced by Tramp himself together with Søren Andersen. The record also features Søren Skov, Claus Langeskov, Kenni Andy, Emily Garriock Langeskov and Jørgen Thorup. A danish tour followed the album release.

In Summer 2024, Tramp played 2 rock festivals for "Songs of White Lion" in Germany and Sweden. Tramp also played a show at "Nemoland" in Copenhagen.

In August 2024, Songs of White Lion Volume 2 was released, featuring Tramp re-imagining ten more select cuts from White Lion's catalog Volume 2 includes the new single and music video for the re recorded "Lights and Thunder" and the reworked "Lonely Nights", "Out With the Boys", "The Road to Valhalla" and "Till Death Do Us Part" were also released as singles featuring visualizer music videos.

Mike Tramp's White Lion embarked on an extended tour supporting Songs of White Lion Volume 2 starting in mid-August 2024 with European and US dates.

In November 2024, Tramp supported The Dead Daisies on their European tour together with his Songs of White Lion guitarist Marcus Nand.

=== 2025: Songs of White Lion Vol III ===
In 2025, Tramp's White Lion performed a tour of Australia and the Philippines. In March, Tramp continued his "Mand Af En Tid" tour in Denmark.

Tramp has finished work on "Songs Of White Lion – Vol. III" which completes the 'Songs Of White Lion' trilogy. In the final installment, Tramp revisits and reimagines ten more essential songs from the White Lion catalog.

Tramp went on a European tour in April and May, performing under the name "Mike Tramp's White Lion". The tour, titled "Lights And Thunder Over Europe", included a stop at the Frontiers Rock Festival in Italy and the countries Sweden, Netherlands, Germany, Greece and Turkey. During the tour, Tramp also announced Vol. 3 of the Songs of White Lion series, expected for release in September.

After the European tour, Tramp's White Lion played several U.S. shows, including Harry's Ribfest and Picktown Palooza in May and June. Between these dates, Tramp performed a couple of solo acoustic shows, including one at the Arcada Theatre. In July and August, Tramp returned to Europe with Tramp's White Lion to perform at Pyraser Classic Rock Night, Rust in Copenhagen, the Skogsröjet Festival in Sweden and the Brienzersee Rockfestival in Switzerland.

Songs of White Lion Volume 3 was released on 19 September 2025 and features the new single of the re-recorded "Cherokee" which is accompanied by a music video, followed by a new single of the reimagined "Fight to Survive" which features an official music video.The song "All Burn in Hell" was also released as a single with a visualizer video. The new reimagined version is a tribute to Ozzy Osbourne. To celebrate the release of Vol 3, Tramp also shared a reimagined version of the single "Radar Love," accompanied by a visualizer.

After the release of Songs of White Lion – Vol. III, Tramp's White Lion embarked on a U.S. tour, including shows in Las Vegas and at the Whisky a Go Go in Los Angeles. The band also performed several additional fly‑in dates across the country. In November, they headed to Europe to begin a tour with dates in England, Wales, Norway and Denmark.

Tramp also shared the single and video for "If My Mind is Evil" (Halloween Edition) wishing everyone a Happy Halloween.

=== 2026: Songs of White Lion tours and Solo ===
For 2026, several United States shows and festival appearances with Mike Tramp’s White Lion have been announced. Tramp has also announced plans for a solo acoustic tour in the United States for spring.

== Discography ==
=== Mabel ===
- Another Fine Mess! (Scandinavia) (1977)
- Message From My Heart (Scandinavia) (released as Boom Boom in Germany) (1978)
- Mabel 4-Ever (Germany) (released as Mabel 4 Ever in Denmark) (1978)
- We Are The 80's (Spain) (also released as Nací Para Hacerte Feliz in Spain) (1979)
- Mabel's Største Successer (Denmark) (compilation album) (1979)
- Extraños (Spain) (1981)
- Det Sidste Boom (Denmark) (compilation album) (2009)

=== Studs ===
- Studs (Spain) (1981)

=== White Lion ===
- Fight to Survive (1985)
- Pride (1987)
- Big Game (1989)
- Mane Attraction (1991)
- The Best of White Lion (1992)
- Remembering White Lion (newly recorded versions of previous songs) (1999) (re-released as Last Roar in 2004)
- Rocking The USA (live double album) (2005)
- Anthology 83-89 (demos) (2006)
- The Definitive Rock Collection (2007)
- Return of the Pride (2008)

=== Freak of Nature ===
- Freak of Nature (1993 Re-Issue 2021)
- Gathering of Freaks (1994 Re-Issue 2021)
- Outcasts (compilation album of B-sides, demos, and outtakes) (1998 Re-Issue 2021)
- Freakthology (limited edition box set, featuring all three previous Freak of Nature complete albums) (2003)

=== Solo discography ===
==== Studio albums ====
Year	Album	Peak positions	
Year	Album	DEN	Swiss
1997	Capricorn	–	–
2002	Recovering the Wasted Years	–	-
2003	More to Life Than This	-	-
2004	Songs I Left Behind	-	-
2009	The Rock 'N' Roll Circuz	16	-
2011	Stand Your Ground	-	-
2013	Cobblestone Street	21	–
2014	Museum	3	–
2015	Nomad	21	-
2017	Maybe Tomorrow	20	–
2019	Stray from the Flock	26	–
2020	Second Time Around	6	66
2022	For Første Gang	13	-
2023	Songs of White Lion	–	69
2024	Mand Af En Tid	-	
2024	Songs of White Lion Vol. 2	-	
2025	Songs of White Lion Vol. 3	-	

==== Live albums ====
Year	Album	Peak positions
Year	Album	DEN
2003	Rock 'N' Roll Alive (Live double album)	-

==== Compilation albums ====
Year	Album	Peak positions	
Year	Album	DEN	Swiss
2020	Trampthology	17	-
2021	Everything Is Alright	24	82

==== Box sets ====
Year	Album	Peak positions
Year	Album	DEN
2017	This & That (But A Whole Lot More)	-

==== Singles ====
Year	Title	Album
1997	"Better Off"	Capricorn
1997	"Already Gone"	Capricorn
1998	"If I Live Tomorrow"	Capricorn
1998	"Take a Little Time" (Leftovers)	Capricorn
2002	"Living a Lie"	Recovering the Wasted Years
2002	"Endless Highway"	Recovering the Wasted Years
2002	"Do It All Over"	Recovering the Wasted Years
2003	"More to Life Than This"	More to Life Than This
2003	"Don't Want to Say Good Night"	More to Life Than This
2009	"All of My Life"	The Rock 'n' Roll Circuz
2009	"Come On"	The Rock 'n' Roll Circuz
2011	"Distance"	Stand Your Ground
2011	"Hymn To Ronnie"	Stand Your Ground
2013	"New Day"	Cobblestone Street
2013	"Revolution"	Cobblestone Street
2013	"The Way It Was Before"	non-album single, Christmas single
2014	"Trust in Yourself"	Museum
2014	"Freedom"	Museum
2015	"High Like A Mountain"	Nomad
2015	"Give It All You Got"	Nomad
2016	"Stay"	Nomad
2017	"Coming Home"	Maybe Tomorrow
2017	"Would I Lie to You"	Maybe Tomorrow
2017	"Spring"	Maybe Tomorrow
2017	"Work It All Out"	This & That (But A Whole Lot More)
2018	"One More Chance"	
2018	"Rust and Dust"	Maybe Tomorrow
2019	"Dead End Ride"	Stray From The Flock
2019	"Homesick"	Stray From The Flock
2019	"Best Days of My Life"	Stray From The Flock
2020	"The Road"	Second Time Around
2020	"Between Good And Bad"	Second Time Around
2020	"When She Cries"	Second Time Around
2020	"Take Me Away"	Trampthology
2021	"Everything Is Alright"	Melodi Grand Prix 2021
2022	"You Only Get to Do It Once"	
2022	"What You Got Left"	
2023	"Cry for Freedom (2023)"	Songs of White Lion
2023	"Little Fighter (2023)"	Songs of White Lion
2024	"Lights and Thunder (2024)"	Songs of White Lion Vol. 2
2024	"Lonely Nights"	Songs of White Lion Vol. 2
2024	"Out With the Boys"	Songs of White Lion Vol. 2
2024	"The Road to Valhalla"	Songs of White Lion Vol. 2
2024	"Till Death Do Us Part"	Songs of White Lion Vol. 2
2025	"Cherokee"	Songs of White Lion Vol. 3
2025	"Fight to Survive"	Songs of White Lion Vol. 3
2025	"All Burn in Hell"	Songs of White Lion Vol. 3
2025	"Radar Love (2025)"	Songs of White Lion Vol. 3
2025	"If My Mind is Evil"	Songs of White Lion Vol. 3

Preceded by Ulla Pia with Stop – mens legen er go'	Denmark in the Eurovision Song Contest; 1978	Succeeded by Tommy Seebach with Disco Tango
