= White Lion =

American glam metal band

- White Lion in 1989; left to right: Greg D'Angelo, Mike Tramp, James LoMenzo, Vito Bratta

Background information
- Origin: New York City, U.S.
- Genres: Glam metal; hard rock
- Years active: 1983–1992; 1999; 2004–2009; 2023–present
- Labels: Asylum Records; Atlantic; Frontiers
- Spinoffs: Freak of Nature
- Members: Mike Tramp; Marcus Nand; Claus Langeskov; Kenni Andy
- Past members: Vito Bratta; Nicki Capozzi; Felix Robinson; Joe Hasselvander; Dave Spitz; James LoMenzo; Greg D'Angelo; Jimmy DeGrasso; Tommy "T-Bone" Caradonna; Kasper Damgaard; Nils Kroyer; Bjarne Holm; Dan Hemmer; Jamie Law; Troy Farrell; Henning Warner
- Website: miketrampofficial.com

White Lion is an American glam metal band formed in New York City in 1983 by Danish vocalist Mike Tramp and American guitarist Vito Bratta. Mainly active in the 1980s and early 1990s, they released their debut album Fight to Survive in 1985. The band achieved success with their No. 8 hit "Wait" and No. 3 hit "When the Children Cry" from their second album, the double platinum selling Pride. The band continued their success with their third album, Big Game, which achieved Gold status and their fourth album, Mane Attraction, which included a supporting tour. White Lion disbanded in 1991 and not long afterwards, their first compilation album, The Best of White Lion, was released.

Mike Tramp reformed White Lion with all new musicians in 1999 and again in 2004, following a failed attempt to reunite the original line up. The new White Lion released a live album in 2005 and a brand new studio album Return of the Pride in 2008.

Beginning in 2023, Tramp brought his version of White Lion back with a trilogy of albums featuring re-recorded versions of White Lion classics, appropriately titled Songs of White Lion.

== History ==
=== Formation and Fight to Survive (1982–1986) ===
After moving from Denmark to Spain and then New York City, vocalist Mike Tramp (formerly of the bands Mabel, Studs, and Danish Lions) met Staten Island guitarist Vito Bratta (formerly of Dreamer) in late November 1982 at L'Amour Rock Club in Brooklyn where Tramp was playing with his band. In March 1983, the two decided to put together a new group. At first, they had a hard time finding a stable rhythm section, trying several different combinations of bassists and drummers, including Michael Clayton on drums (who later played in the band Tyketto). They eventually settled on drummer Nicki Capozzi and bassist Felix Robinson (formerly of Angel) and named the group White Lion. Around this time, L'Amour owners George and Mike Parente (along with Richard Sanders) began managing the band, giving them a "home venue" of sorts to begin building a following.

White Lion was signed by Elektra Records in 1984, at which point, they recorded their debut album Fight to Survive. Elektra was unhappy with the final recording, and after refusing to release the album, terminated the band's contract.

Fight to Survive was eventually released by Victor Company of Japan, Ltd, (JVC Records) in Japan in 1985. Philadelphia-based Grand Slamm Records bought the album from Elektra and released it in America the following year, under license by Elektra/Asylum Records. Fight to Survive featured the band's debut single and music video, "Broken Heart," and later charted at number 151 on Billboard 200 in 1988. A few months after the album's release, Grand Slamm Records went bankrupt.

Meanwhile, Felix Robinson departed the band after they were dropped by Elektra in 1984, eventually being replaced by bassist Dave Spitz (brother of Anthrax guitarist Dan Spitz). With the Tramp, Bratta, Capozzi, Spitz lineup, the band recorded a round of demos for their second album, and continued to play shows in New York while shopping around for a new record deal. This incarnation of White Lion played a fictional band in the Tom Hanks/Shelley Long movie The Money Pit, which was released a year later. The soundtrack featured the song "Web of Desire" (credited to "White Lion and Robey" (portrayed by Louise Robey)), which was demoed that year. The film soundtrack was never officially released, although the song plays in the movie during both of the band's scenes. Nicki Capozzi was subsequently fired due to health issues, with former Anthrax drummer Greg D'Angelo replacing him in September 1985.

Dave Spitz left at the beginning of 1986 to join Black Sabbath, and was briefly replaced by Bruno Ravel, who left shortly afterwards because he was not allowed to contribute ideas, and subsequently formed Danger Danger. In March 1986, James LoMenzo was asked to fill the bass slot, completing what has become known as the band's classic lineup.

=== Pride (1987–1988) ===
Early in 1987, the band was signed by Atlantic Records. After recording the next album in a mere six weeks, the band released Pride on June 21, 1987. The first single, "Wait", was released on June 1, 1987, but did not reach the charts for nearly seven months.

The Pride tour started in July 1987 as White Lion opened for Frehley's Comet. The next year and a half was filled with constant touring, opening for such bands as Aerosmith, Stryper and Kiss. In January 1988, White Lion landed the opening slot for AC/DC on their Blow Up Your Video album American tour.

While the band toured with AC/DC, the Pride album and "Wait" single finally charted, due in no small part to MTV airing the "Wait" music video in regular rotation—nearly seven months after the single's release. "Wait" hit no. 8 on the singles chart, while Pride hit no. 11 on the albums chart. Pride would remain on the Billboard 200 chart for a full year, selling two million copies in the US alone and achieving double platinum status.

In August 1988, the album's second single, "Tell Me", reached no. 58. Around the time this single was released, White Lion played at the Ritz club in New York City. The show was filmed and later aired on MTV. The Pride album's third single, an acoustic ballad titled "When the Children Cry", made it to no. 3 on the US charts with heavy MTV airplay.

The success of "When the Children Cry" would eventually push sales of Pride over the two million mark. In addition, Vito Bratta was recognized for his instrumental talents by racking up Best New Guitarist awards with both Guitar World magazine and Guitar for the Practicing Musician magazine. "All You Need Is Rock 'n' Roll" was the final single released from the album.

In the end of 1988, the Pride tour finally ended, and the band released their first video albums titled Live at the Ritz and One Night in Tokyo both of which featuring full concerts on VHS.

The band then immediately began work on their next album.

=== Big Game & Mane Attraction (1989–1991) ===
In August 1989, White Lion released their third album, Big Game, an eclectic follow-up to Pride that featured the single "Little Fighter" (which peaked at No. 52), in Memory of The Rainbow Warrior, a Greenpeace boat which was destroyed by the French. A cover of Golden Earring's "Radar Love" (which peaked at No. 59) was released as the second single and "Cry for Freedom", a political song about apartheid in South Africa was released as the third single. "Going Home Tonight" was released as the album's final single. The album quickly went gold, with a peak of No. 19 on the albums chart. The band's success continued with more constant touring. They did a European tour, including a string of UK arena shows supporting Mötley Crüe with Skid Row, and also played with Ozzy Osbourne and Cinderella.

After less successful gigs in England and mixed reviews of the new album, the band chose to take a few months off after the turn of the year to focus on writing a new album. Just in time for the late autumn of 1990, they entered the A&M studios with a new producer. White Lion released their fourth album Mane Attraction in March 1991. The album featured the singles "Love Don't Come Easy" which peaked at number 24 on the Mainstream Rock chart, "Lights and Thunder", which is an eight-minute heavy rock epic with a complex structure inspired by Led Zeppelin's "Achilles Last Stand", and a re-recorded version of the band's debut single "Broken Heart", all of which featured music videos. "You're All I Need" was released as promo single and "Farewell to You" featured a music video montage. The album also contained White Lion's only instrumental song, "Blue Monday", a tribute to Stevie Ray Vaughan, who had died while the band was writing the album. The album's two ballads "You're All I Need" and "Till Death Do Us Part" gained popular airplay in Indonesia and the Philippines.

Greg D'Angelo and James LoMenzo left the band in June 1991 when they came back from the European tour, citing "musical differences," but White Lion carried on with bassist Tommy T-Bone Caradonna and former Y&T drummer Jimmy DeGrasso, both of whom had previously toured with Lita Ford.

=== Breakup (1991–1992) ===
After briefly touring in support of Mane Attraction, Tramp and Bratta decided to fold the group, their last show being held in Boston at the Channel in September 1991. Exactly one year later, in September 1992, the band's first compilation album was released, titled The Best of White Lion.

Tramp has in later interviews told that the band split up due lack of interest from the record company, issues with the band management and above all the entry of grunge music.

A video/DVD album featuring concert footage, behind the scenes interviews and all of the band's music videos was also released, titled Escape from Brooklyn.

When asked what the album would be like if he and Vito Bratta had released another album after Mane Attraction, Tramp said it would have hinted at their growth and evolution, and taken them further away from the 1980s sound. He commented:

I was kind of shocked cause to me it sounded like Vito and I weren't done working together and I was surprised that he never put up a fight when I said 'No more White Lion.' It was that he just lay down and gave up. I am not saying that White Lion would have continued if he and I had put up a fight. But I am sure that if we had sat down and talked and really looked at the picture and sorted out what had gone wrong and how much was our fault and how much was Kurt Cobain's, then there could possibly be a mature and musically serious band existing today, called White Lion.

=== Following White Lion ===
James LoMenzo and Greg D'Angelo joined Zakk Wylde's band, Lynyrd Skynhead, in the mid-1990s which became the band Pride & Glory when Greg D'Angelo was replaced by Brian Tichy. Pride & Glory released one album, then James LoMenzo left the band. James went on to record and tour with ex-Van Halen frontman David Lee Roth, Zakk Wylde's band Black Label Society and thrash metal pioneers Megadeth.

Vito Bratta stayed briefly with Atlantic Records to help produce an album for CPR, and later tried to form a new music group that never panned out. Despite a dedicated worldwide following among guitar aficionados, Vito disappeared from public view from 1992 until his interview by Eddie Trunk live on February 16, 2007. Vito is the sole owner of the White Lion music catalog, retaining the legal and distributive rights to all four original albums. The material was licensed entirely to Bratta's Vavoom Music, Inc, when Tramp sold off his share in the mid-1990s.

Mike Tramp went on to form the alt-rock / heavy metal band Freak of Nature, The follow-up was significantly heavier and darker than White Lion, featuring two guitar players and more visceral songs with a strong rhythmic foundation. The band released three albums between 1992 and 1998, Freak of Nature, Gathering of Freaks, and Outcasts. The band shared stages with Helloween and Dio in Europe in 1993. Freak of Nature eventually disbanded in 1996.

Following Freak of Nature, Tramp began a solo career, releasing his debut album as a solo artist in 1998 titled Capricorn. The album featured former Freak of Nature bandmates, guitarist Kenny Korade and bass player Jerry Best. Former White Lion bass guitarist James LoMenzo performed backing vocals on the album. The song "Better Off" was released as Tramp's debut solo single and features his first solo music video. The album also features the singles "Already Gone", "If I Live Tomorrow" and "Take a Little Time".

=== The new White Lion (1999–2006) ===
In 1999 after commencing his solo career, Mike Tramp, with all new musicians, also released Remembering White Lion, which featured new versions of some of White Lion's classic songs and started what would be a long battle to reform White Lion.

In 2000, momentum for a White Lion reunion continued with the release of a second best of album titled White Lion Hits followed by an updated White Lion compilation titled The Essential White Lion.

In 2002, Tramp released his second solo album, Recovering the Wasted Years, and at the same time was attempting to reform the original White Lion.

In October 2003, following the release of Tramp's third solo album More to Life Than This, Tramp finally announced a White Lion reunion, without confirmation of who the lineup would be. Later, Tramp said that Vito Bratta wanted nothing to do with a reunion. With summer festivals in Europe already booked, Tramp attempted to put together a "new White Lion" featuring former members James LoMenzo and Jimmy DeGrasso, along with Warren DeMartini of Ratt. Vito Bratta filed suit claiming partial ownership of the name, and the tour was scrapped. Tramp later commented that despite his willingness, "There will never be an original White Lion reunion".

In 2004, due to legal issues, the album Remembering White Lion was re-released under the new title Last Roar featuring the band name Tramp's White Lion.

In late 2004, Mike Tramp organized another group of unknown musicians and continued with a new White Lion under the act Tramp's White Lion (TWL), However, persistent legal issues continued with former members. Nonetheless, TWL (a.k.a. White Lion 2) played and re-recorded White Lion songs, touring and releasing a box set titled The Bootleg Series in 2004 and a double-live CD entitled Rocking the USA in 2005.

The band had several concerts canceled in late 2005 as promoters backed away due to the threat of possible legal action, and by the end of the year Tramp had almost completely given up on White Lion. Six months later, however, he found himself inspired to continue with the booking of a European tour for November and December 2006. Tramp's White Lion played several dates in Europe including Sweden, Norway, Spain, Italy, Greece, Turkey, Germany, Netherlands, Belgium and Denmark.

In 2005, a Concert Anthology DVD was released followed by the album Anthology in 2006, the latter featuring never before released songs and demo versions of White Lion classic songs from previous albums.

=== Return of the Pride (2007–2008) ===
On February 16, 2007, Vito Bratta appeared on the Eddie Trunk radio show in New York, stating that despite what Mike Tramp said, he had never refused a White Lion reunion, stating that the only reason he was unable to participate was due to the illness of his father. He added that he would still be open to the idea and has not closed the door to returning to the music industry again. Trunk made it clear that Bratta's involvement in the show was something that he had wanted to happen since White Lion first broke up in 1991. Bratta took calls and answered questions from fans for almost three hours. On April 6 and 7, 2007, at the L'Amours Reunion Shows in New York, Bratta made his first public musical appearances in over 15 years.

Three weeks later Mike Tramp called Trunk's show from Australia, speaking about Bratta and the band's new album, including the tour dates that Tramp's White Lion had recently confirmed. Tramp said that he was thankful that Bratta had finally answered fans' questions, the same questions he himself had been asked many times over the past 15 years. He also stated that he felt uncomfortable answering on Vito's behalf, and that he was upset that Vito had withdrawn himself from the music industry.

A White Lion compilation The Definitive Rock Collection was released in 2007 and the band was set for a summer tour with Poison and Ratt, only to be dropped by the tour promoter after ex-White Lion guitarist Vito Bratta again threatened to take legal action over the band name.

In response to the rumors surrounding the White Lion and Poison/Ratt summer tour, Tramp issued a statement explaining that tour promoters Live Nation's decision was not based on any controversy over whether Mike Tramp has the legal right to perform as White Lion. Live Nation's decision was based upon the threatened lawsuit by Vito Bratta. Even though Live Nation believed Bratta's lawsuit to be frivolous and had confirmed that Mike Tramp has the legal right to perform as White Lion, they did not want to spend 'one dollar' on litigation. Faced with the cancellation of a tour that was to begin within weeks, the band's attorneys negotiated a deal with Vito Bratta to drop his threatened lawsuit. However, even with the threat of litigation eliminated, Live Nation did not reinstate White Lion onto the tour. Extremely upset with the decision, Tramp acknowledged the many fans across the United States who were also disappointed by Live Nation's decision.

Despite the threatened legal action and the band's removal from the Poison/Ratt tour, White Lion continued touring and fulfilled their many headline shows in the U.S. that were scheduled between the Poison shows, including the Rocklahoma festival with Poison, Ratt, Quiet Riot, Slaughter, Y&T, Gypsy Pistoleros, Dirty Penny, Greg Leon Invasion and Zendozer. Tramp also confirmed to MelodicRock.com that the band had just finished recording its new studio album and the CD would be mixed by Dennis Ward and titled Return of the Pride.

The new studio album entitled Return of the Pride was released on March 14, 2008, and the band was now once again simply known as White Lion. The band did a world tour to support the album. White Lion toured India and played to 42,000 at Shillong, Meghalaya, and a 30,000 plus crowd at the Dimapur stadium in Nagaland. The band was invited to India by the head of the Tripura Royal Family Maharaja Kirit Pradyot Deb Burman. The album featured the singles "Dream" and "Live Your Life".

A live DVD was released on December 5, 2008, entitled Bang Your Head Festival 2005.

Following the release of Return of the Pride, Tramp faced a tumultuous time of professional indecision as he tried to decide between continuing his solo career or pouring his energy into White Lion. Tramp's 2009 solo album The Rock 'N' Roll Circuz was initially intended to be the next new White Lion album but a new solo band was formed instead.

With White Lion ultimately put on hold again, Tramp continued with his solo career and in 2013 announced in several interviews that there would no longer be a White Lion of any kind, including the new White Lion or any possible reunions. In 2014, Tramp once again confirmed there would be no more White Lion.

=== Songs of White Lion (2023–present) ===
In 2023 Mike Tramp announced bringing his version of White Lion back with the upcoming release of Songs of White Lion, via Frontiers Music Srl on April 14, 2023. As the title implies, the new album sees Tramp re-imagining select cuts from White Lion's catalog. A re-recorded "Cry for Freedom" was released as the first single, followed by a reworked take on "Little Fighter".

In August 2024, Songs of White Lion Volume 2 was released, featuring Tramp re-imagining ten more select cuts from White Lion's catalog Volume 2 includes the new single and music video for the re recorded "Lights and Thunder" and the reworked "Lonely Nights", "Out with the Boys", "The Road to Valhalla" and "Till Death Do Us Part" were also released as singles featuring visualizer music videos. Tramp will embark on an extended tour supporting Songs of White Lion Volume 2 starting in mid-August 2024 with European and US dates, followed by Australia in 2025.

Songs of White Lion Vol. III was released in September 2025; the album completes the 'Songs of White Lion' trilogy. In the final installment, Tramp revisits and reimagines ten more essential songs from the White Lion catalog. The album features the new single of the re-recorded "Cherokee", which is accompanied by a music video, followed by a new single of the reimagined "Fight to Survive" which features an official music video. The song "All Burn in Hell" was also released as a single with a visualizer video. The new reimagined version is a tribute to Ozzy Osbourne. To celebrate the release of Vol 3, Tramp also shared a reimagined version of the single “Radar Love,” accompanied by a visualizer. Tramp also shared the single and video for “If My Mind is Evil” (Halloween Edition) wishing everyone a Happy Halloween.

== Band members ==
=== Current ===
- Mike Tramp – lead vocals, rhythm guitar (1983–1992, 1999–2009, 2023–present)
- Claus Langeskov - bass (2004–2009, 2023–present)
- Marcus Nand - lead guitar (2023–present)
- Kenni Andy - drums (2023–present)

=== Former ===
- Vito Bratta – lead guitar, backing vocals (1983–1992)
- Joe Hasselvander – drums (1983)
- Nicki Capozzi – drums (1983–1984)
- Felix Robinson – bass (1983–1984)
- Dave Spitz – bass (1984–1985)
- James LoMenzo – bass, backing vocals (1985–1991)
- Greg D'Angelo – drums (1984–1991)
- Jimmy DeGrasso – drums (1991–1992)
- Tommy "T–Bone" Caradonna – bass (1991–1992)
- Kasper Damgaard – lead guitar (1999–2003)
- Nils Kroyer – bass (1999–2003)
- Bjarne T. Holm – drums (1999–2003)
- Dan Hemmer – keyboards (1999–2003)
- Jamie Law – lead guitar (2004–2009)
- Troy Patrick Farrell – drums (2004–2009)
- Henning Wanner – keyboards (2004–2009)

== Social issues ==
Unlike most bands of their genre, White Lion recorded occasional songs that addressed social or political issues such as apartheid ("Cry for Freedom"), the war in El Salvador ("El Salvador") and the effect of divorce on children ("Broken Home"). The song "Little Fighter" was about the Rainbow Warrior, a ship owned by the environmental group Greenpeace that was destroyed by the French government.

== Discography ==
Year	Title	Label
1985	Fight to Survive	Asylum Records
1987	Pride	Atlantic Records
1989	Big Game	Atlantic Records
1991	Mane Attraction	Atlantic Records
2008	Return of the Pride	Frontiers Records
2023	Songs of White Lion Vol. 1	Frontiers Records
2024	Songs of White Lion Vol. 2	Frontiers Records
2025	Songs of White Lion Vol. 3	Frontiers Records
