= Wait (White Lion song) =

Single by White Lion

from the album Pride
- A-side: "Wait"
- B-side: "Don't Give Up"
- Released: June 1, 1987
- Recorded: 1987
- Genre: Glam metal
- Length: 4:00
- Label: Atlantic
- Songwriters: Mike Tramp, Vito Bratta
- Producer: Michael Wagener

White Lion singles chronology
"Broken Heart" (1985)	"Wait" (1987)	"Tell Me" (1988)

"Wait" is a power ballad recorded by White Lion and written by White Lion vocalist Mike Tramp and guitarist Vito Bratta. It was the lead single from their second album, Pride.

The single was released on June 1, 1987, but did not chart until February 1988. In May 1988, "Wait" finally cracked the top 10 in the US, peaking at No. 8, due in no small part to MTV airing its music video in regular rotation—nearly seven months after the single's release. The song also charted at #48 in Canada and #88 in the UK.

== Music video ==
The music video featured Christie Muhaw of The Flirts, who died in a car accident less than a year after the video propelled the song into the top 10. Her death at only 24 years old made the song's lyrics especially poignant.

== Background ==
Singer Mike Tramp said,

There’s almost no origin to that song. The story goes, Vito started playing the riff and the very first word out of my mouth was “Wait." It’s one of the simplest lyrics I’ve ever written, but it’s also the perfect American FM song. It’s right up there with Journey, Foreigner and all those other classic songs. “Wait” was just one of those songs that worked really well in the studio and for the video.

== Versions ==
"Wait" featured an extended remix which was released as a bonus track on "Pride". The song was also re-recorded in 1999 on the album Remembering White Lion (also released as "Last Roar" in 2004) and a live version was released in 2005 on the White Lion live album Rocking the USA. The live version was released as a promo and later iTunes single and also features as a bonus track on the bands most recent album Return of the Pride.

== Track listing ==
1. "Wait" – 4:00
2. "Don't Give Up" – 3:15

== Personnel ==
- Mike Tramp – Lead vocals
- Vito Bratta – Guitars
- James LoMenzo – Bass guitar
- Greg D'Angelo – drums

== Charts ==
=== Weekly charts ===
Chart (1988)	Peak position
Canada Top Singles (RPM)	48
UK Singles (Official Charts)	88
US Billboard Hot 100	8
US Album Rock Tracks (Billboard)	18

=== Year-end charts ===
Chart (1988)	Position
United States (Billboard)	99
