= When the Children Cry =

1988 single by White Lion

Single by White Lion

from the album Pride
- B-side: "Lady of the Valley"
- Released: October 1988
- Genre: Glam metal
- Length: 4:18 (album\single version); 4:04 (promo version)
- Label: Atlantic
- Songwriters: Vito Bratta; Mike Tramp
- Producer: Michael Wagener

White Lion singles chronology
"Tell Me" (1988)	"When the Children Cry" (1988)	"All You Need Is Rock 'n' Roll" (1989)

"When the Children Cry" is a power ballad performed by Danish-American glam metal band White Lion. It is the third single and closing track on their 1987 album, Pride. It peaked at number three on the US Billboard Hot 100, number two in Canada, and number 88 in the United Kingdom.

== Background ==
The song was written immediately after Live Aid, and was partly influenced by singer Mike Tramp's childhood. He said, "“I was around five or six when my father left us. My mom was left with three boys. So without a doubt my own story is in that song."

He also said,

Even though the words are simple, it has a very powerful lyric. Imagine being a kid from Copenhagen, Denmark, sitting there in Staten Island and writing, “No more presidents, and all the wars will end" at the time when Ronald Reagan is the president. But it was how I felt at the time. That song began by just sitting around and playing. Then Vito changed it to the fingerpicking style.

== Versions ==
The song was re-recorded in 1999 on the album Remembering White Lion (also released as "Last Roar" in 2004) and a live version was released on the White Lion live album Rocking the USA. The re-recorded and live versions were both released as promo singles and later as iTunes singles. In 2004, an acoustic version of "When the Children Cry" was included on the VH1 Classic Metal Mania: Stripped compilation.

== Track listing ==
7-inch single

1. "When the Children Cry" – 4:04
2. "Lady of the Valley" – 6:38

== Personnel ==
- Mike Tramp – lead vocals
- Vito Bratta – lead guitar
- James LoMenzo – bass guitar
- Greg D'Angelo – drums

== Charts ==
=== Weekly charts ===
Chart (1988–1989)	Peak position
Canada Top Singles (RPM)	2
Sweden (Sverigetopplistan)	7
UK Singles (Official Charts)	88
US Billboard Hot 100	3
US Album Rock Tracks (Billboard)	7
US Cash Box Top 100	4

=== Year-end charts ===
Chart (1989)	Position
Canada Top Singles (RPM)	53
US Billboard Hot 100	60

== See also ==
- List of anti-war songs
