= Michael Wagener =

German record producer

Michael Wagener (born 25 April 1951) is a German retired record producer, mixer and engineer from Hamburg, best known for his work with many popular American hard rock and heavy metal bands in the late 1980s. He is particularly renowned for his multi-amping and re-amping techniques. Wagener's works have sold over 90 million albums worldwide.

== History and career ==
Wagener was the original guitarist for the German band Accept. When he turned 18, he was drafted into the West German army and was stationed 350 miles away from home. This made it difficult for him to practice with the rest of the band and hence he quit the band. After completing his military service, Wagener began working as an audio engineer in Hamburg in 1972. Through a friendship with singer Don Dokken, Wagener moved to Los Angeles. In 1981 he produced the first Dokken album, and would go on to produce such seminal albums as Skid Row's self-titled debut, which sold five million copies in the US alone. Wagener also mixed Metallica's 1986 classic Master of Puppets. He also engineered the single version of Janet Jackson's "Black Cat", his only pop collaboration.

Wagener has produced or mixed platinum selling albums by Mötley Crüe, W.A.S.P., Overkill, Accept, Great White, Stryper, Poison, Keel, Alice Cooper, Lordi, Extreme, Megadeth, Janet Jackson, Ozzy Osbourne, Dokken, Metallica, White Lion and Skid Row.

Wagener believes that "psychology is a big part of getting great results out of musicians." He also argues that the work of a real producer is sometimes undermined or ignored by some bands who feel they can produce their albums on their own once they work with a producer. Comments Wagener:

Some [bands] are very open minded and you can make suggestions about musical changes or ideas and they will pick it up and make it their own. Others don't want a lot of outside influences, because they are scared it would take away from their creativity or credit. In those cases, if you want to achieve a certain result, you have to plant a "creative seed" which, in a few days will turn into the result you are looking for, but it still seems like it was all the idea of the musician him/herself. The downside, of course is, that the musician looks at it as if he did ALL the work and the producer "didn't really do anything". The logical next step for those kind of musicians is to produce their next album themselves, their ego telling them they don't need a producer and, like in the above mentioned case, they might fall flat on their face, and come up with an album that doesn't sell anywhere near what the previous one did.

In 1996, Wagener moved to Nashville, Tennessee and built WireWorld Studio, a recording studio. Wagener announced his retirement on his 72nd birthday, on 25 April 2021.

== Select discography ==
- Accept – Breaker (engineer)
- Accept – Restless and Wild (engineer, mixer)
- Accept – Balls to the Wall (mixer)
- Accept – Russian Roulette (engineer)
- Alice Cooper – Constrictor (engineer, mixer)
- Alice Cooper – Raise Your Fist and Yell (engineer, mixer)
- Bonfire – Fireworks (producer)
- Bonfire – Point Blank (producer, song writing)
- Dark Avenger – Tales of Avalon: The Lament (mixer)
- Dokken – Breaking the Chains (producer)
- Dokken – Tooth and Nail (mixer)
- Dokken – Under Lock and Key (producer)
- Extreme – Pornograffitti (producer)
- Flotsam and Jetsam – No Place for Disgrace (mixer)
- Great White – Out of the Night EP (producer, engineer, mixer)
- Great White – Great White (producer)
- Hair of the Dog – Rise (producer)
- HammerFall – Renegade (producer, engineer, mixer)
- Helloween – Chameleon (mixer)
- Wolf Hoffmann – Classical (producer)
- Janet Jackson – "Black Cat" (Single Version) (engineer)
- Jerusalem Slim – Jerusalem Slim (producer, mixer)
- Kane Roberts – Saints and Sinners (mixer)
- Keel – Keel (producer)
- King's X – Ogre Tones (producer)
- King's X – XV (producer)
- Lordi – Babez for Breakfast (producer, mixer)
- Lordi – To Beast or Not to Beast (producer, mixer)
- Malice – In the Beginning (producer, mixer)
- Megadeth – So Far, So Good...So What! (mixer)
- Metallica – Master of Puppets (mixer)
- Mötley Crüe – Too Fast for Love (mixer)
- Outrage – Life Until Deaf (producer)
- Outrage – Who We Are (producer)
- Overkill – Under the Influence (mixer)
- Ozzy Osbourne – No More Tears (mixer)
- Raven – All for One (producer)
- Rocktopuss - Dog Bite (producer)
- Rocktopuss - Naked (producer)
- Saigon Kick – Saigon Kick (producer, mixer)
- Sergeant Steel – Men on a Mission (mixer)
- Skid Row – Skid Row (producer, engineer, mixer)
- Skid Row – Slave to the Grind (producer, mixer)
- Skid Row – Revolutions per Minute (producer)
- Smashed Gladys – Social Intercourse (mixer)
- Street Fighter – Shoot You Down (producer, engineer, mixer)
- Stryper – Soldiers Under Command (producer, engineer)
- Testament – Low (mixer)
- The Rasmus – Black Roses (mixer)
- TKillya – Intensity (producer, engineer, mixer)
- Warrant – Dog Eat Dog (producer)
- W.A.S.P. – Inside the Electric Circus (mixer)
- White Lion – Pride (producer)
- White Lion – Big Game (producer)
- X – Ain't Love Grand! (producer)
