= Pride (White Lion album) =

1987 studio album by White Lion

Studio album by White Lion
- Released: June 22, 1987
- Genres: Glam metal; hard rock
- Length: 44:09
- Label: Atlantic
- Producer: Michael Wagener

White Lion chronology
Fight to Survive (1985)	Pride (1987)	Big Game (1989)

Singles from Pride
- 1. "Wait" Released: June 1987; 2. "Tell Me" Released: June 1988; 3. "When the Children Cry" Released: October 1988; 4. "All You Need Is Rock 'n' Roll" Released: 1988

Professional ratings
Review scores
Source	Rating
AllMusic	4.5/5 stars
Classic Rock	3.5/5 stars

Pride is the second studio album by the American-Danish glam-metal band White Lion, released on June 22, 1987, by Atlantic Records. The album featured the two top ten hits "Wait" and "When the Children Cry". It peaked at number 11 on the Billboard 200 and remained in the Billboard Top 200 for a full year, selling two million copies in the US alone.

== Overview ==
The recording process of the album took six weeks and the album was produced by Michael Wagener. The album's first single, "Wait", was released on June 1, 1987, but did not make waves until MTV began airing the music video in January 1988, seven months after its release, pushing the single to #8 on the Billboard Hot 100. In August 1988, more than a year after the album's release, the second single "Tell Me" also featuring a music video hit #58. Pride's third single, a gentle acoustic ballad titled "When the Children Cry", made it all the way to #3, again with heavy MTV rotation of the music video. The album peaked at #11 on the album charts. Pride would remain on the top 200 Billboard album charts for a full year.

The success of "When the Children Cry" would eventually push sales of Pride over the two million mark in the US, achieving double platinum status. In addition, guitarist Vito Bratta was recognized for his instrumental talents by racking up Best New Guitarist awards with both Guitar World magazine and Guitar for the Practicing Musician magazine.

"All You Need Is Rock 'n' Roll" was the fourth single released from the album.

In 1986, the band first recorded a few songs in Frankfurt, in the same studio as "Fight to Survive". But on returning home, they chose to ignore these songs and record a brand new record in Los Angeles. These demo songs can be found on "Pride Take One ´86" and the later "Anthology" album.

When they were recording the drums, Vito played the solo to the song "Wait" as a backing track but the producer was so pleased that they kept the recording. Michael Wagener has said in interviews that he got goosebumps when he heard Vito play the solo. They also borrowed an older Fender Stratocaster that once belonged to Jimi Hendrix to record another solo on the record.

In an interview with drummer Greg D`Angelo, he says that the first demo songs had the same raw sound as the first record, but they took a chance on recording and releasing the record with the new, slightly more commercial sound and the result was satisfactory.

== Tour ==
The Pride tour started in June 1987, as White Lion opened for Frehley's Comet. The next year and a half was filled with constant touring, opening for such bands as Aerosmith, Ozzy Osbourne. Kiss in December 1987. In January 1988 White Lion landed the opening slot for AC/DC on their Blow Up Your Video American tour. They would end the tour opening for Stryper in the summer of 1988.

While White Lion toured with AC/DC, the Pride album and "Wait" single charted, due in no small part to MTV airing the "Wait" music video in regular rotation – nearly seven months after the single's release. In February 1988, a show "Live at the Ritz" in New York City was filmed for an MTV concert special and was released on VHS along with another full concert video titled "One Night in Tokyo". The Pride tour ended in the spring of 1989.

== Track listing ==
All tracks written by Vito Bratta and Mike Tramp.

No.	Title	Length
1.	"Hungry"	3:55
2.	"Lonely Nights"	4:11
3.	"Don't Give Up"	3:15
4.	"Sweet Little Loving"	4:02
5.	"Lady of the Valley"	6:35
6.	"Wait"	4:00
7.	"All You Need Is Rock 'n' Roll"	5:14
8.	"Tell Me"	4:28
9.	"All Join Our Hands"	4:11
10.	"When the Children Cry"	4:18
Total length:		44:09

=== HNE Recordings 2020 box set bonus tracks ===
No.	Title	Length
11.	"Wait" (Extended remix)	6:21
12.	"When the Children Cry" (Edit)	4:07
13.	"All You Need Is Rock 'n' Roll" (LP version with intro edit)	4:22
14.	"All You Need Is Rock 'n' Roll" (Short Version)	3:38
15.	"Tell Me" (Edit)	4:04
Total length:		66:41

== Personnel ==
=== White Lion ===
- Mike Tramp – vocals, rhythm guitar
- Vito Bratta – lead guitar
- James LoMenzo – bass
- Greg D'Angelo – drums

=== Production ===
- Produced, engineered & Mixed By Michael Wagener
- Assistant engineer: Gggarth
- Mastered By George Marino
- All Songs Published By Vavoom Music

== Charts ==
Chart (1988)	Peak position
Australian Albums (ARIA)	149
Canada Top Albums/CDs (RPM)	44
Swedish Albums (Sverigetopplistan)	30
US Billboard 200	11

== Certifications ==
Region	Certification	Certified units/sales
Canada (Music Canada)	Platinum	100,000^{^}
United States (RIAA)	2× Platinum	2,000,000^{^}
^{^} Shipments figures based on certification alone.

== Accolades ==
Publication	Country	Accolade	Rank
PopMatters	US	10 Essential Glam Metal Albums	5
Rolling Stone	US	50 Greatest Hair Metal Albums of All Time	22
L.A. Weekly	US	Top 20 Hair Metal Albums of All Time	19
Guitar World	US	Top 20 Hair Metal Albums of the Eighties	14
Loudwire	US	Top 30 Hair Metal Albums	30
Metal Rules	US	Top 50 Glam Metal Albums	23
