= James LoMenzo =

American bass guitarist (b. 1959)

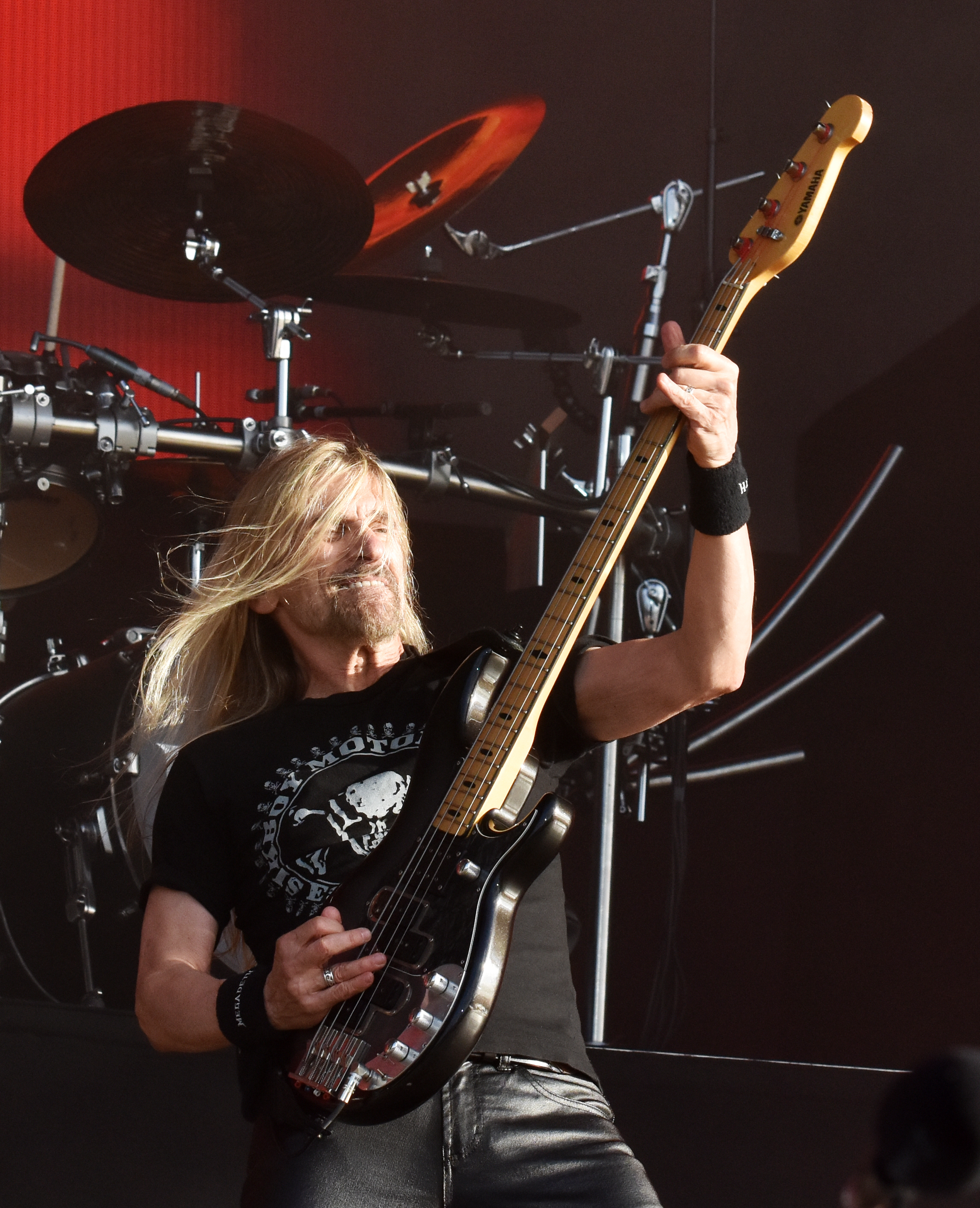
- LoMenzo performing in 2023

Background information
- Born: January 13, 1959 (age 67)
- Origin: Brooklyn, New York, U.S.
- Genres: Heavy metal; hard rock; glam metal; thrash metal; blues rock; Southern rock
- Occupation: Bassist
- Years active: 1978–present
- Member of: Megadeth, HAIL!
- Formerly of: White Lion, Black Label Society, Pride & Glory, Slash's Snakepit, David Lee Roth's Band, Lynch Mob, Clockwork, Rondinelli, Ace Frehley
- Website: jameslomenzo.com

James LoMenzo (born January 13, 1959) is an American musician, currently the bassist for thrash metal band Megadeth. He has previously been a member of White Lion, Black Label Society, Pride & Glory and Slash's Snakepit, and played with David Lee Roth, John Fogerty and Ace Frehley. LoMenzo was the bassist for Megadeth from 2006 to 2010, and rejoined the band as a touring member in August 2021, before becoming a permanent member again in June 2022. Outside of music, LoMenzo appeared as a contestant on the 21st season of the reality television series The Amazing Race.

== Early life and career ==
LoMenzo is the grandson of Italian immigrants, and was raised in Bensonhurst. He graduated from Xaverian High School in 1977.

=== Early days, White Lion, Zakk Wylde, and other projects (1977–2005) ===
In the late 1970s, LoMenzo started in a band called Empty Sky, a rock band with hints of jazz. The band was based out of Brooklyn and was one of the biggest up-and-coming young bands. LoMenzo was the band's lead vocalist and bassist. The band consisted of Robert Littera on lead guitar, Julie Pontecorvo on trumpet, Marco Lagana on trombone, Frank Bonanno on tenor saxophone, Oscar Olivera on drums, Vincent Chirico on rhythm guitar and John Buccellato on electric piano. The band broke up as the members began to mature and take their separate career paths.

In 1979 LoMenzo joined the band Hooker, fronted by Debbi Pantera Saint, Kiss drummer Eric Carr's girlfriend at the time. Other members were Dave Steele (David Bland who played with Rik Fox in an early version of SIN) and Gerry Laufer on guitars and Gael de Courtivron on drums.

LoMenzo played bass with Clockwork, his first original hard rock band from 1980 to 1983. He then went on to play in the band Rondinelli with Ray Gillen, before joining White Lion in 1984.

LoMenzo played bass with White Lion from 1984 to 1991. He would go on with bandmate Greg D'Angelo to play with former Kiss guitarist Ace Frehley, and then later with Zakk Wylde's side-project Lynyrd Skynhead who evolved into Pride & Glory, who released one album in 1994. Although he left the band during their 1994 tour, he returned to play on Zakk Wylde's 1996 solo album Book of Shadows. He had a brief stint in the recording studio with Ozzy Osbourne in 1994, but material from the sessions were not used, and Ozzmosis was re-recorded with different musicians the next year. In 1995, LoMenzo, along with Pride & Glory drummer Brian Tichy, joined Slash's Snakepit as touring musicians. He was a member of David Lee Roth's band in the late 1990s and early 2000s and performed on his album Diamond Dave.

In 2004, LoMenzo rejoined Zakk Wylde in his band Black Label Society until October 2005, when he was replaced by Black Label Society's original bassist John DeServio.

=== Megadeth (2006–2010, 2021–present) ===
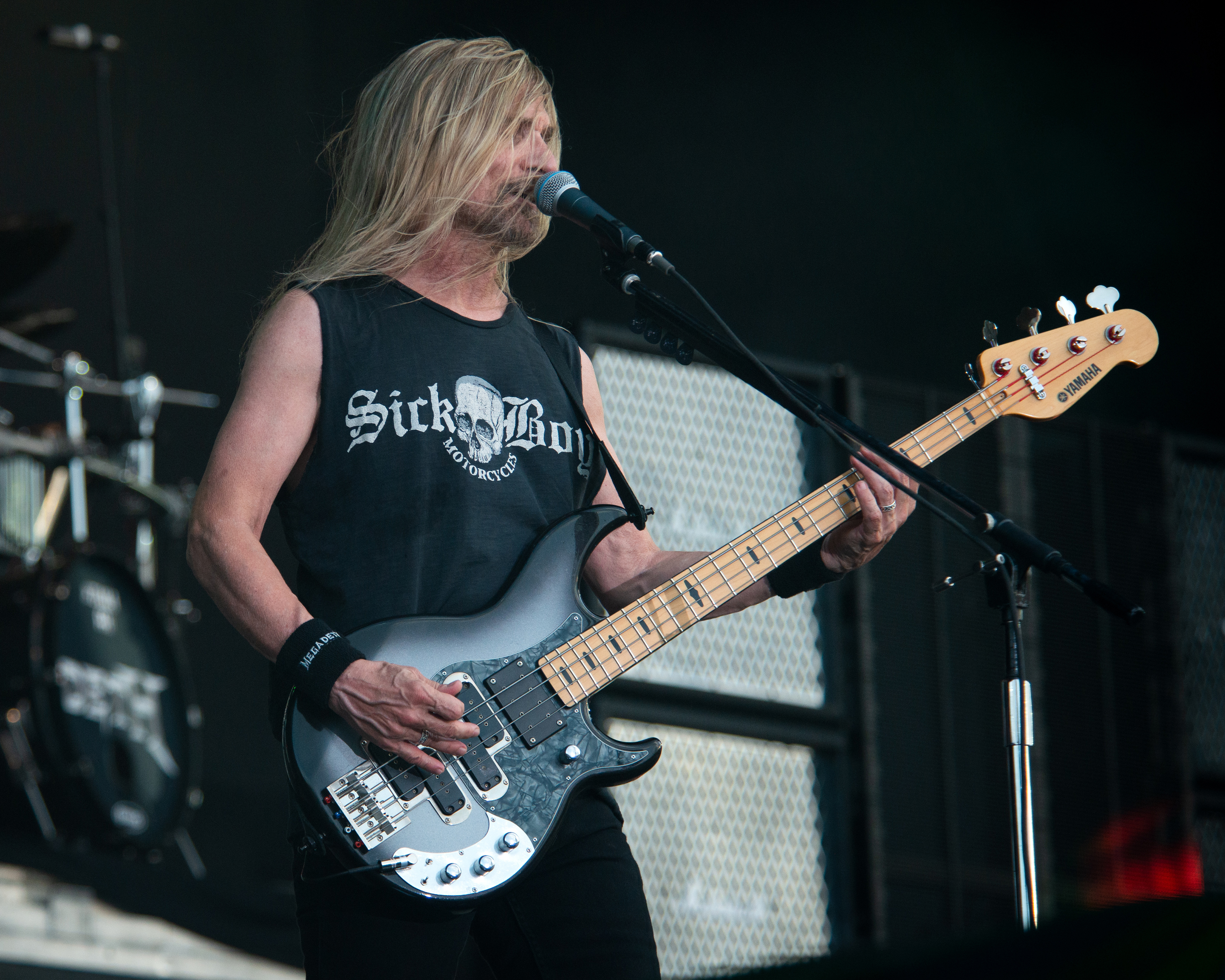
LoMenzo with Megadeth at Hellfest 2022

From February 2006 to February 2010, LoMenzo was the bassist of thrash metal band Megadeth. The first Megadeth record he performed on was 2007's United Abominations. LoMenzo also performed on the band's next album, Endgame, which was released in 2009. The album received generally positive reviews from critics, with the song "Head Crusher" nominated for Best Metal Performance at the 2010 Grammy Awards, the band's eighth Grammy nomination in 19 years. A selection of Lomenzo live performances can be seen in the video albums Gigantour 2 and MetalMania 2008. In February 2010, it was announced that original Megadeth bassist Dave Ellefson would rejoin the band, replacing LoMenzo.

In August 2021, it was announced that LoMenzo had returned to Megadeth as Ellefson's replacement for the band's upcoming tour. Ellefson had been fired from the band three months prior in May 2021. In May 2022, Megadeth confirmed on their website that Lomenzo was again a permanent member of the band. Apart from Ellefson, LoMenzo is the only other bass player for Megadeth who has performed with Marty Friedman, when Friedman joined the band on stage at Budokan on February 27 and Wacken Open Air on August 4, 2023.

=== Other projects (2010–present) ===
In 2010, LoMenzo played bass for Lynch Mob. He is also part of the band Hideous Sun Demons. In October 2013, he joined John Fogerty's band.

LoMenzo played bass on the album Get Your Rock On by X-Drive, which was released in August 2014 via Frontiers Records and produced by Led Zeppelin engineer Andy Johns. He is also featured on the Sweet & Lynch album Only to Rise featuring Michael Sweet, George Lynch, and Brian Tichy, which was released in 2015.

In 2018 Lomenzo played bass on Grimorio, the fourth studio album by Italian metal group Bastian. He also appeared in Obszön Geschöpf's album Master of Giallo, contributing bass to the song "The Moon Watches Me When I Kill". In 2020, LoMenzo joined forces with Chris Adler (Lamb of God, Megadeth) and formed heavy metal band Firstborne, with the independent release of their self titled debut digital EP.

In 2023, LoMenzo played bass for Glen Poland's metal music project Hollentor third album Divergency. He appeared on the song "Forgotten" by Sinful Betty's band which also featured Michael Angelo Batio on guitars and Brian Tichy on drums. Together with Tichy on drums, Lomenzo played bass on the debut EP by Libertad, an Argentinian hard rock trio fronted by Guillermo Lara.

Outside of metal music, LoMenzo played bass for Lisa Gee's EP Shut It Down, which also features Carmine Appice on drums and Don Mancuso on guitars. Together with Kenny Aronoff on drums, Lomenzo appeared in the song "Alive" by rising blues-rock guitarist Nathan Pope. Lomenzo also played bass for country star Dean M. Collins album Land Where The Wishes Come True. LoMenzo appeared in American keyboardist Bob Malone's album Good People, playing bass on a cover of the Fleetwood Mac song "Oh Well".

== Other ventures ==
LoMenzo is also a graphic artist and did the art work for Gilby Clarke's solo album Rubber in 1998. Also, in 1997, he did the photos in Mike Tramp's first solo album Capricorn. LoMenzo is also a member of a tribute band called HAIL!. HAIL!'s rotating cast of members include Andreas Kisser, Tim "Ripper" Owens, Paul Bostaph, David Ellefson, Mike Portnoy, Jimmy DeGrasso, and Roy Mayorga. Owens, DeGrasso, Ellefson and Kisser formed the band in late 2008. The band toured Europe in 2009, and in June 2010, HAIL! was on their second European tour with the line-up Andreas Kisser, Tim Owens, Paul Bostaph, and LoMenzo. Due to the death of previously announced Slipknot bassist Paul Gray, LoMenzo agreed on only one day's notice to fly to Portugal and play the Rock in Rio festival where HAIL! was scheduled to perform on May 30, 2010. Lomenzo also joined Lynch Mob in late July 2010, replacing Marco Mendoza. LoMenzo previously jammed with Lynch Mob drummer Brian Tichy in both Pride & Glory and Slash's Snakepit.

On August 29, 2012, LoMenzo was announced as a cast member of The Amazing Race 21 along with his partner Mark "Abba" Abbattista. They ended up in 6th place out of 11 teams and were the sixth team eliminated at Sokolniki Park in Moscow, Russia due to an unsuccessful search for Abba's stolen passport.

In October 2014, LoMenzo briefly joined former Megadeth members Nick Menza and Chris Poland for an unnamed project. Shortly after announcing this project, LoMenzo left, to be replaced by OHM bassist Robby Pagliari. Nick Menza would go on to join OHM as drummer, filling the role left by David Eagle's death.

== Gear ==
LoMenzo is best known for his frequent use of the Warwick Buzzard bass and Warwick Stryker bass. His amplification section is dominated by Ashdown amps and cabinets. His effects pedals include Dunlop Crybaby, MXR Chorus, MXR Distortion, and Aphex Punch as well as other pedals. He has his own signature pedal, the Ashdown Lomenzo Hyperdrive. His rig bears a strong resemblance to that of John Entwistle, who also used Ashdown amps and Buzzard basses. LoMenzo is an endorser of RotoSound bass strings. He is also known to play a spyder model Alembic bass guitar. He was also seen playing a Fender Marcus Miller Jazz Bass for the entirety of the 2007 Megadeth Tour of Duty. As of September 2008, LoMenzo has been seen playing a Yamaha BB Custom Shop model which has a slightly smaller body than a standard BB, two pairs of P bass pickups (one reversed), a neck pickup based on a Dimarzio Model One, a maple neck, and a Hipshot D-Tuner. Some Megadeth photos show LoMenzo playing Yamaha Attitude Ltd models that also have the P-bass/neck pickup and D-tuner configuration.

== Discography ==
With Rondinelli

- Wardance (1996)

With White Lion

- Pride (1987)
- Big Game (1989)
- Mane Attraction (1991)

With Pride & Glory

- Pride & Glory (1994)

With Blindside Blues Band

- To The Station (1996)

With Zakk Wylde

- Book of Shadows (1996)

With Jon Bare & The Killer Whales

- Shredzilla (1997)
- Orcastra (2001)

With Gilby Clarke

- Rubber (1998)

With Randy Pevler

- Chrome (2002)

With David Lee Roth

- Diamond Dave (2003)

With The Hideous Sun Demons

- The Hideous Sun Demons (2004)

With Black Label Society

- Hangover Music Vol. VI (2004)
- Mafia (2005)
- The European Invasion – Doom Troopin' Live (2006)

With Megadeth

- United Abominations (2007)
- Gigantour 2 (2008)
- Endgame (2009)
- The Sick, The Dying... And The Dead! (2022) (Credited but does not perform.)
- Megadeth (2026)

With Swans In Flight

- Swans In Flight (2008)

With Tim "Ripper" Owens

- Play My Game (2009)

With X-Drive

- Get Your Rock On (2014)

With Sweet & Lynch

- Only to Rise (2015)
- Unified (2017)

With Bastian

- Grimorio (2018)

With John Fogerty

- 50 Year Trip: Live at Red Rocks (2019)

With Firstborne

- Firstborne (2020)

With Hollentor

- Divergency (2023)

With Lisa Gee

- Shut It Down (2023)

With Dean M. Collins

- Land Where The Wishes Come True (2023)

With Libertad

- El Grito Sagrado (2024)
