= Greg D'Angelo =

American drummer

- Born: December 18, 1963 (age 61); Brooklyn, New York, U.S.
- Genres: Glam metal; hard rock; heavy metal; thrash metal
- Occupation: Musician
- Instrument: Drums
- Years active: 1981–present

Greg D'Angelo, (born December 18, 1963) is an American drummer most famous for his work in the bands White Lion, Anthrax, and Pride & Glory.

== Career ==
=== Early career (1981–1984) ===
Between 1981 and 1983, D'Angelo was a member of Anthrax. He appeared on the band's initial demo tape and also on the EP Armed and Dangerous. After leaving Anthrax, he joined the band Cities. In 1985, he appeared on Burning Starr's debut album, Rock the American Way.

=== White Lion (1985–1991) ===
D’Angelo joined White Lion in 1985, replacing Nicky Capozzi. The band gained worldwide success with the release of the albums Pride (1987), Big Game (1989), and Mane Attraction (1991). In September 1991, the rhythm section of D'Angelo and bassist James LoMenzo left due to business discrepancies. Although White Lion reunited on various occasions, D'Angelo did not partake in any of them, although he later stayed in contact with his former bandmates.

=== Post-White Lion career (1992–present) ===
In 1993, both D'Angelo and LoMenzo performed with Zakk Wylde as Lynyrd Skynhead, who upon D'Angelo's departure from the band would become Pride & Glory. In 1996 D'Angelo joined Orange County band Pirates of Venus and stayed with the band through 1998. He was also a former drummer for the band AntiProduct.

In 2010 D'Angelo joined Stephen Pearcy's solo band. He recorded the Smash album with Pearcy in 2017 and toured with Pearcy until 2018. D'Angelo currently works out of his mix studio in Los Angeles and is a counselor at Rock 'n Roll Fantasy Camp. D'Angelo is also currently a principal with the performance group Legends of Classic Rock
