= Vito Bratta =

American guitarist

- Born: July 1, 1961 (age 64); Staten Island, New York, U.S.
- Genres: Glam metal; hard rock
- Occupations: Musician, Songwriter
- Instruments: Guitar, vocals
- Years active: 1983–1992; 2007

Vito Bratta (born July 1, 1961) is an American guitarist and the former co-songwriter for the glam metal band White Lion. He co-founded White Lion with lead singer Mike Tramp in 1983 and played with the band until 1991.

== Biography ==
Bratta began playing guitar at the age of 13 and later became a member of a cover band from New Jersey called Dreamer. In 1982, he was a frontrunner to replace Bernie Tormé in Ozzy Osbourne's band but clashed with manager Sharon Osbourne and lost out to Brad Gillis. He was then asked to replace Ace Frehley in Kiss but declined after being asked to change his name to "something less ethnic".

In 1983 he formed White Lion together with Mike Tramp where he was a member until the band's breakup in 1991. During the band's heyday he often played a headless Steinberger or ESP guitars. In the September 1989 issue of Guitar World, he graced the cover for the first time.

When White Lion disbanded in September 1991, he soon started a short-lived project together with singer John Levesque that they called "Civil War" but that soon dissolved.

The last available guitar tracks Vito did was a guest appearance on the Coven, Pitrelli, Reilly 1992 album CPR, on the track E-11 where he plays the first, third and fifth solo. He also played one of the middle solos on the AC/DC cover "Back in black".

After 1992, he has rarely been seen in public. He still lives where he grew up on Staten Island where he works to take care of his family.

In 2003, Mike Tramp attempted to reunite with Bratta but was unsuccessful. Tramp talked about Bratta in later interviews with Anarchy Music, claiming Bratta was always quiet and maintained a certain distance from the rest of the band.

On February 16, 2007, Bratta gave his first live interview in over 12 years. The following points were revealed during the Eddie Trunk interview: Bratta's father went through a 5-year illness, which required a large amount of personal time and commitment on Vito's part, both emotionally and financially. In 1997, he injured his wrist and finds it painful to move his hand up and down an electric guitar's neck; however he still manages to play classical guitars without excessive discomfort. In addition, he clarified that he has never ruled out a White Lion/Mike Tramp reunion; up until now, they have simply been impossible due to family obligations and his wrist injury.

In April 2007, Vito Bratta made his first public musical appearances in over 15 years, at both Friday and Saturday night shows at the L'Amour Reunion Shows in New York.

Aside from this, Bratta has kept a low profile, but did agree to be featured in Richard Bienstock and Tom Beaujour’s book "Nothin' But a Good Time.” He also interviewed with journalist Matt Wake for Guitar World Magazine as featured in 2022’s ‘80s issue.

In 2023, Bratta agreed to an interview with journalist Andrew Daly for Guitar World Magazine, as well as another (also with Daly) for Guitar World Online regarding “Guitarists Who Shaped His Sound.”

These are the only interviews Bratta has agreed to publicly, as he generally chooses to decline press requests.

== Discography ==
Year	Title	Label
1985	Fight to Survive	Asylum Records
1987	Pride	Atlantic Records
1989	Big Game	Atlantic Records
1991	Mane Attraction	Atlantic Records

== Legacy ==
Although Bratta has not released any music since 1992, many musicians, both singers and guitar players, have continued to praise his songwriting skills and technical ability. Zakk Wylde has stated that Bratta is the only guitarist whose tapped playing he enjoys. He has also praised Vito Bratta's originality and pointed out that he considers the solo in "Wait" one of the best solos he has ever heard. Bratta's partner in White Lion, Mike Tramp, also remarked that Bratta's skills as a guitar player and songwriter were unmatched:

Vito the guitar player and Vito the songwriter and musician, he was in a calibre all by himself. It shows in his great solos, and so many people love the way he played like Eddie with the hammer-ons and all that stuff like the Van Halen solo on "Ain't Talkin' 'bout Love. I just love the way Vito played solos on “Wait” and “Little Fighter” and some of the others. He was like Mozart.

Tramp also mentioned that many accomplished guitar players turned him down when he attempted to put together a new version of White Lion:

We tried to do new White Lions with Warren DeMartini and Paul Gilbert and all these others, and no one wanted to do Vito. He was unlike anyone else, he had his own way of doing things, and plus he was a great songwriter. Had he remained in the business, Vito would have been bigger than Steve Vai and all those types of guys. With him the melody came before anything else, and that’s nothing but the highest praise.

Guitar World Magazine named Bratta one of the best 20 guitarists of the 1980s, commenting:

Vito Bratta was the most tasteful, lyrical and inventive guitarist of his generation, adding structure, style and an unerring pop sensibility to Van Halen’s oft-tapped fountain of inspiration.

Producer Michael Wagener called Bratta his "favorite guitar player" on February 17, 2007, when he called the Eddie Trunk show.
