= Aria discography =

This is the discography of the Russian heavy metal band Aria.

== Studio albums ==
Original title	Transliterated title	Translation	Year of release
Мания Величия	Maniya Velichiya	Megalomania	1985
С кем Ты?	S kem Ty?	Whom Are You With?	1986
Герой Асфальта	Geroy Asfal'ta	Hero of Asphalt	1987
Игра с Огнём	Igra s Ogneom	Play with Fire	1989
Кровь за Кровь	Krov' za Krov'	Blood for Blood	1991
Ночь Короче Дня	Noch' Koroche Dnya	Night Shorter Than Day	1995
Генератор Зла	Generator Zla	Generator of Evil	1998
Химера	Himera	Chimera	2001
Крещение Огнём	Kreshenie Ogneom	Baptism by Fire	2003
Армагеддон	Armageddon	Armageddon	2006
Феникс	Feniks	Phoenix	2011
Через все времена	Cherez vse Vremena	Through All Times	2014
Проклятье морей	Proklyat'ye morey	Curse of the Seas	2018
Когда настанет завтра	Kogda nastanet zavtra	When tomorrow comes	2025

== Singles ==
Original title	Transliterated Title	Translation	Year of release
Потерянный Рай	Poterenny Ray	Lost Paradise	2001
Колизей	Kolizei	Coliseum	2002
Чужой	Chuzhoi	Alien	2006
Поле Битвы	Pole Bitvy	Battlefield	2009

== Live albums ==
Original title	Transliterated Title	Translation	Year of release
Сделано в России	Sdelano v Rossii	Made in Russia	1995
В Поисках Новой Жертвы...	V Poiskah Novoy Zhertvy...	Searching For A New Sacrifice...	2003
Живой Огонь	Zhivoy Ogon'	Living Fire	2004
Пляска Ада	Pliaska Ada	Hell's Dance	2007
Герой Асфальта: ХХ Лет	Geroy Asfal'ta: Dvatsat' Let	Hero of Asphalt: 20 Years	2008

== DVDs ==
Original title	Transliterated Title	Translation	Year of release
Пляска Ада	Pliaska Ada	Hell's Dance	2007
Герой Асфальта: ХХ Лет	Geroy Asfal'ta: Dvatsat' Let	Hero of Asphalt: 20 Years	2008
Сделано в России	Sdelano v Rosiyi	Made in Russia	1996

== Compilations ==
Original title	Transliterated Title	Translation	Year of release
Легенды Русского Рока	Legendy Russkogo Roka	Legends of Russian Rock	1997
Лучшие песни	Luchshie Pesni	The Best Songs	1999
2000 и Одна Ночь	2000 i Odna Noch'	2000 and One Night	1999
Потерянный Рай	Poterenny Ray	Lost Paradise	2000
Grand Collection			2000
Штиль	Shtil'	The Calm	2002
Легенды Русского Рока 2	Legendy Russkogo Roka 2	Legends of Russian Rock 2	2003
Беспечный Ангел	Bespechny Angel	Careless Angel (Cover of Golden Earring's "Going to the Run")	2004

== Soundtracks ==
Original title	Transliterated Title	Translation	Year of release
Дальнобойщики-2. Саундтрек	Dal'noboyshiki-2 Saundtrek	Hard Truck 2: King of the Road Soundtrack	2000

== Tribute Albums ==
Title	Year of release
Tribute to Harley-Davidson	1999

== Side projects ==
Artists	Original title	Transliterated Title	Translation	Year of release
Dubinin & Holstinin	АвАрия	AvAria	Malfunction, and a play on the band's name	1997
Kipelov & Mavrin	Смутное Время	Smutnoye Vremia	Sad Ages	1997
