= Sergey Popov (guitarist) =

Russian guitarist

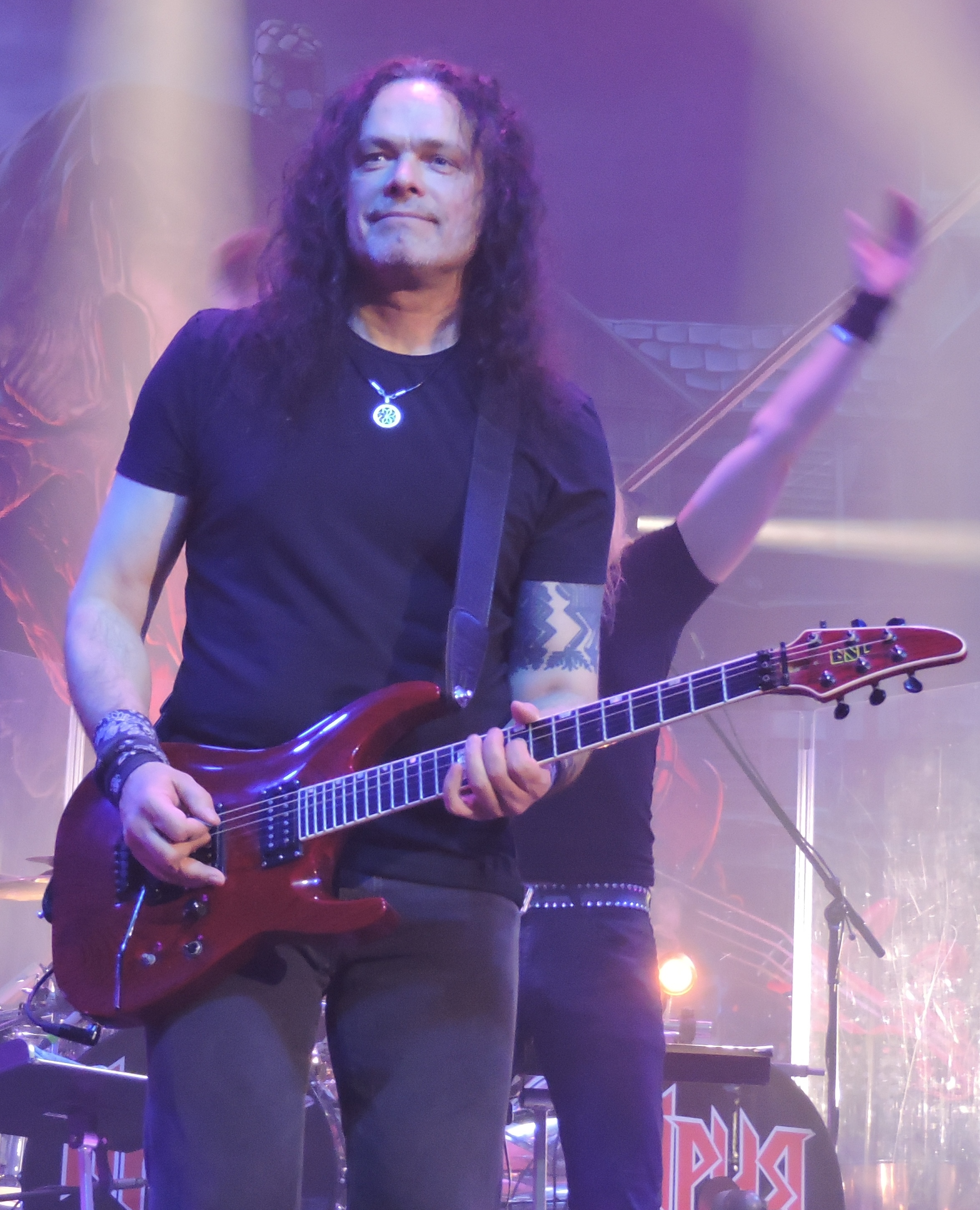
- Sergey Popov in 2018

Background information
- Born: Sergey Sergeevich Popov; 20 September 1959 (age 67); Moscow, Russian SFSR, USSR
- Genre: Heavy metal
- Occupations: Musician, songwriter
- Instrument: Guitar
- Years active: 1983–present
- Labels: Moroz Records; АРИЯ Records; CD-Maximum

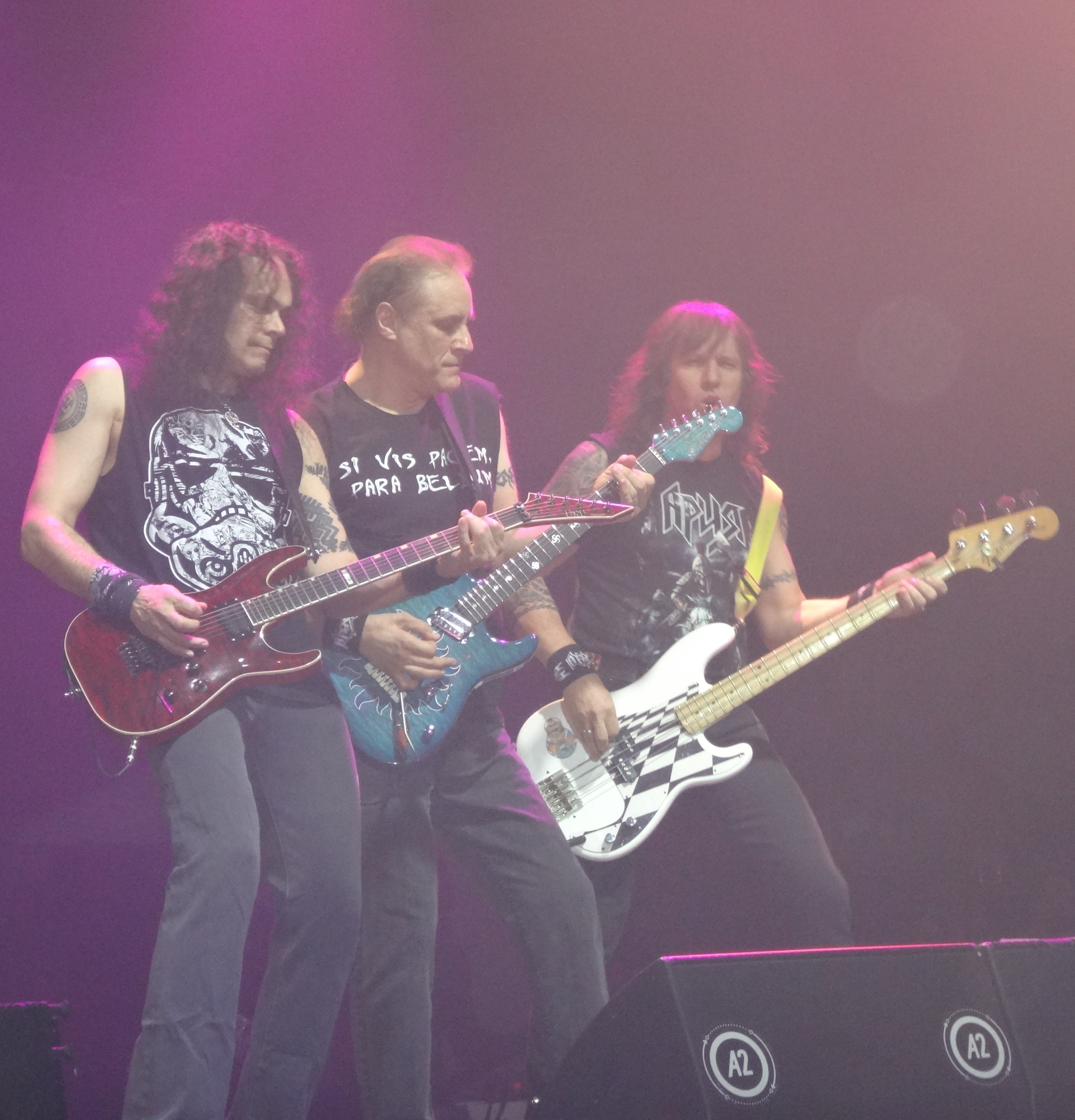
Sergey Popov with Vladimir Holstinin and Vitaly Dubinin

Sergey Sergeevich Popov (Russian: Сергей Сергеевич Попов; born 20 September 1959) is a Russian musician, guitarist and songwriter of Russian heavy metal band Aria. Before joining the Aria, he was the guitarist of the heavy metal band Master.

== Biography ==
Sergey Popov was born on 20 September 1959 in Moscow. He graduated from high school in 1976. In 1981 graduated from Moscow Electrotechnical Institute of Communications.

The guitar started playing from the age of 13, participated in the Institute's groups. From an amateur rock band with its other members moved to the VIA Hello, Song, at that time under the direction of Igor Matvienko, at the Krasnodar Philharmonic, where he played from 1983 to 1986. At the same time he studied at the Tsaritsyno Music School as a guitar.

In 1987 he was invited a second guitarist in the band Master, with whom recorded two albums and went to Belgium in 1989. In Belgium, the group disbanded and Popov continued to collaborate with Master as a session musician. In 1995, Sergey returned to the Master and recorded the album "Songs of the Dead", where he performed not only as a composer, but also as the author of some texts.

In 1997, together with the priests invited for a tour in France by vocalist Arthur Berkut and drummer of Master Anatoly Shenderov leaving the band, and create their own project "ZOOOM", which has not received development.

From 1998 to 2002 Sergey Popov participated in various projects and became interested in electronic music.

In 2002, Popov became the new guitarist of the band Aria, with which he recorded five albums, and also co-wrote several songs.

== Personal life ==
Married. Wife — Svetlana Popova.

== Discography ==
=== Master ===
- Мастер (1987)
- С петлёй на шее (1989)
- Talk of the Devil (1992)
- Maniac Party (1994)
- Live (1995)
- The Best (Концерт в Москве '97) (1997)

=== Aria ===
- Колизей (2002)
- Крещение огнём (2003)
- Миссия (2004)
- Беспечный Ангел (2004)
- Живой огонь (2004)
- Чужой (2006)
- Армагеддон (2006)
- Пляска ада (2007)
- Герой асфальта: 20 лет (2008)
- Поле битвы (2009)
- Феникс (2011)
- Live in Studio (2012)
- В жёлтом круге арены (2012)
- Через все времена (2014)
- Котёл истории. Live MMXV (2015)
- 30 (1985–2015) (2016)
- Классическая Ария (2016)
- 30 лет! Юбилейный концерт (2016)
- Гонка за славой (2018)
- Варяг (2018)
- Проклятье морей (2018)
