= Noch koroche dnya =

Ночь короче дня

Studio album by Aria
- Released: 1995
- Genre: Heavy metal
- Length: 45:05
- Label: Moroz Records
- Producer: Vitaly Dubinin, Vladimir Holstinin

Aria chronology
Кровь за кровь (1991)	Ночь короче дня (1995)	Генератор зла (1998)

Professional ratings
Review scores
Source	Rating
Darkside	8/10

Noch koroche dnya (Russian: Ночь короче дня, lit. Night is Shorter Than Day), is the sixth studio album by Russian Heavy metal band Aria.

It is the first album to feature guitarist Sergey Terentyev, who replaced Sergey Mavrin. During the recording of Noch koroche dnya, the band was about to split up, as vocalist Valery Kipelov was going to leave the band alongside Mavrin to start a new project. Alexey Bulgakov was hired as a replacement vocalist and recorded several songs with Aria. Ultimately, Moroz Records persuaded Kipelov to return to the band and record his part. Versions of songs with Bulgakov on vocals were never officially released. Songs for the planned Kipelov and Mavrin project were released as the album Smutnoye Vremia in 1997.

== Track listing ==
All lyrics are written by Margarita Pushkina

No.	Title	Lyrics	Music	English title	Length
1.	"Рабство Иллюзий"	Margarita Pushkina	Vitaly Dubinin, Vladimir Holstinin	Slavery of Illusions	5:51
2.	"Паранойя"	Pushkina	Dubinin	Paranoia	4:59
3.	"Ангельская Пыль"	Pushkina	Dubinin, Holstinin	Angel Dust	6:00
4.	"Уходи, И Не Возвращайся"	Pushkina	Dubinin	Leave and Don't Return	3:51
5.	"Король Дороги"	Pushkina	Dubinin, Holstinin	King of the Road	4:17
6.	"Возьми Моё Сердце"	Pushkina	Dubinin, Holstinin, Valery Kipelov, Sergey Mavrin	Take My Heart	4:06
7.	"Зверь"	Pushkina	Dubinin, Kipelov, Holstinin	Beast	3:44
8.	"Дух Войны"	Pushkina	Dubinin	Spirit of War	4:58
9.	"Ночь Короче Дня"	Pushkina	Dubinin, Holstinin	Night is Shorter Than Day	7:14

Interesting fact: The songs "Take my heart" and "Beast" are written to the same melody in different rhythms, and were planned as a related dilogy. However, there is no direct connection in the lyrics and both songs are separate works.

== Personnel ==
- Valery Kipelov - Vocals
- Vladimir Holstinin - Guitar, Sound Engineer
- Виталий Дубинин - Bass, Sound Engineer
- Сергей Терентьев - Guitar
- Александр Манякин - Drums
- Aleksandr Myasnikov - Keyboard
- Margarita Pushkina - Lyrics
- Aria - Management
- Andrey Subbotin - Mastering
- Vasily Gavrilov - Artist
- Nadir Chanishev - Photography
- Pavel Semenov - Computer Design
