= Kreshchenie ognyom =

Kreshchenie Ognyom

Studio album by Aria
- Released: 2003
- Genre: Heavy metal
- Length: 51:23
- Label: ARIA Records
- Producer: Aria

Aria chronology
Химера (2001)	Kreshchenie Ognyom (2003)	Армагеддон (2006)

Professional ratings
Review scores
Source	Rating
Darkside	7/10

Kreshchenie Ognyom (Russian: Крещение Огнём; lit. Baptism by Fire) is Aria's ninth studio album, the first album not to feature long-time vocalist and co-founder of the band - Valery Kipelov. CD version of this release is enhanced and features the video for the song "Kolizey".

The tracks "Kolizey", "Tam vysoko" and "Kreshchenie ognyom" had reached the top position in Russian radio charts in 2003.

== Track listing ==
All lyrics are written by Margarita Pushkina, except where noted

No.	Title	Lyrics	Music	English title	Length
1.	"Патриот"		Vladimir Holstinin	Patriot	4:19
2.	"Крещение Огнём"		Vitaly Dubinin	Baptism by Fire	6:06
3.	"Колизей"	Aleksandr Yelin	Vladimir Holstinin	Coliseum	6:29
4.	"Палач"		Vladimir Holstinin	Executioner	8:38
5.	"Твой Новый Мир"		Vitaly Dubinin	Your New World	4:04
6.	"Там Высоко"		Vitaly Dubinin	There Up High	5:37
7.	"Белый Флаг"	Alexander Yelin	Vladimir Holstinin	White Flag	4:40
8.	"Битва"		Sergey Popov	Battle	5:01
9.	"Бал У Князя Тьмы"		Vladimir Holstinin	Prince of Darkness's Ball	5:58

== Lyric themes ==
- "Patriot" tells about fighting against Islamic terrorism.
- "Kreshchenie ognyom" tells about pagan resistance against forced baptism.
- "Kolizey" recalls Ridley Scott's The Gladiator.
- "Palach" tells the story of an immortal executioner who killed insane man called God's son and his inner struggle.
- "Bitva" tells a science-fiction story of an alien invasion.
- "Bal u knyazya tmy" is based on The Master and Margarita by Mikhail Bulgakov.

== Personnel ==
- Arthur Berkut - Vocals
- Vitaly Dubinin - Bass
- Vladimir Holstinin - Guitar
- Sergey Popov - Guitar
- Maxim Udalov - Drums

Cover art by Leo Hao.
