= The Arrow (band) =

- Origin: Moscow, Russia
- Genres: Heavy metal
- Years active: 1994–present
- Label: CD-Maximum
- Members: Pavel Blischenko; Alexander "Snake" Tsvetkov
- Website: www.thearrow.ru

The Arrow (previously known as Black Arrow) are a heavy metal band from Moscow, Russia. The band was founded in 1994 by Pavel Blischenko, the only member who has remained during the frequent line-up changes. The Arrow released a demo and three full-length albums: "Children of Gods", "Keeper of Souls" and "Lady Nite". The latter guested many famous vocalists: Hansi Kursch (Blind Guardian), Peter Wagner (Rage), Artur Berkut (Aria), Andrey Fedorenko (Archontes) and guitarist Sergey Mavrin (Mavrik). The band also recorded two cover-songs, "Dai Ruku Mnie" ("Give Me Your Hand", together with the band Roza Vetrov), which appeared on the Russian album "Tribute To Aria" and "Time What Is Time", included on the International Blind Guardian Tribute "Tales From the Underworld".

== Members ==
=== Current members ===
- Pavel Blischenko - Keyboards
- Alexander "Snake" Tsvetkov - Bass
- Alexey Bykov- Drums
- Ilya Lain - Guitar
- Daniyl "Dante" Burenkov - Guitar
- Jerry Lenin - Vocal

=== Former members ===
- Alex Cap - Vocals
- Andrey Khramov - Vocals
- Yury Bobyrev - Guitar
- Andrey Sedletsky - Guitars
- Sergey Knyazev - Guitars
- Kirill Emel'yanov - Guitars
- Dmitriy Mercalov - Bass
- Victor Astashov - Bass
- Valentin Dobrovol'skiy - Drums
- Alexey Bykov - Drums

== Discography ==
- Flyin' High (1997, demo)
- Tribute to Aria (2001, track "Dai Ruku Mnie", with Roza Vetrov)
- Tribute to Blind Guardian (2003, track "Time What Is Time")
- Children Of Gods (2001)
- Keeper Of Souls (2006)
- Lady Nite (2008)
