= Chimera (Aria album) =

Химера

Studio album by Aria
- Released: 2001
- Genre: Heavy metal
- Length: 57:24
- Label: Classic Company
- Producer: Aria

Aria chronology
Генератор зла (1998)	Химера (2001)	Крещение огнём (2003)

Chimera (Russian: Химера) is the eighth studio album by Russian heavy metal band Aria and the last to feature vocalist Valery Kipelov.

== Track listing ==
No.	Title	Lyrics	Music	English title	Length
1.	"Химера"	Alexander Yelin	Vladimir Holstinin, Valery Kipelov	Chimera	4:37
2.	"Небо Тебя Найдёт"	Yelin	Holstinin	Heaven Will Find You	5:29
3.	"Я не Cошёл с Ума"	Margarita Pushkina	Sergey Terentyev	I'm Not Mad	6:25
4.	"Вампир"	Yelin	Holstinin	Vampire	5:28
5.	"Горящая Стрела"	Pushkina	Vitaly Dubinin	Burning Arrow	4:09
6.	"Штиль"	Pushkina	Dubinin	The Calm	5:33
7.	"Путь в Никуда"	Pushkina, Kipelov	Kipelov	Path to Nowhere	5:27
8.	"Ворон"	Pushkina	Dubinin	Raven	5:42
9.	"Осколок Льда"	Pushkina	Dubinin	Shard of Ice	5:25
10.	"Тебе Дадут Знак"	Yelin	Holstinin	You Will Be Given a Sign	8:52

== Personnel ==
- Valery Kipelov – vocals
- Vladimir Holstinin – guitar, keyboards on tracks 1, 3 and 4
- Sergey Terent'ev – guitar
- Vitaly Dubinin – bass, keyboards on tracks 6, 8 and 9
- Alexander Maniakin – drums
- Sergey Naumenko – keyboards on track 7
- Oleg Mishin – flute solo on track 4
- Leo Hao – cover art

Additional musicians

- Udo Dirkschneider – vocals on " "Штиль"
