= Armageddon (Aria album) =

Studio album by Aria
- Released: October 1, 2006
- Genre: Heavy metal
- Length: 54:52
- Label: CD-Maximum
- Producer: Aria

Aria chronology
Крещение огнём (2003)	Armageddon (2006)	Феникс (2011)

Armageddon (Russian: Армагеддон) is the tenth studio album by Aria, and the first after signing to the CD-Maximum label.

Track #8 "Chuzhoy" reached the 1st position on the Russian radio charts.

It was the last album of the band to feature Artur Berkut on its line-up.

== Track listing ==
No.	Title	Lyrics	Music	English title	Length
1.	"Последний Закат"	Igor Lobanov	Vladimir Holstinin	Last Sunset	5:01
2.	"Меченый Злом"	Nina Kokoreva	Sergey Popov	Marked by Evil	6:08
3.	"Страж Империи"	Margarita Pushkina	Vitaly Dubinin	Guardian of the Empire	4:43
4.	"Новый Крестовый Поход"	Pushkina	Vitaly Dubinin	The New Crusade	4:53
5.	"Мессия"	Lobanov	Vladimir Holstinin	Messiah	4:38
6.	"Кровь Королей"	Pushkina	Vitaly Dubinin	The Blood of Kings	9:00
7.	"Викинг"	Pushkina, Popov	Sergey Popov	Viking	5:48
8.	"Чужой"	Pushkina	Vladimir Holstinin	Alien	5:03
9.	"Свет Былой Любви"	Pushkina	Vitaly Dubinin	The Light of Bygone Love	4:18
10.	"Твой День"	Pushkina	Artur Berkut	Your Day	5:19

== Lyric themes ==
- "Strazh imperii" tells about Japanese kamikaze in World War II
- "Novy krestovy pokhod" is sung from the point of Knight Templar
- "Messiya" tells of the struggle between Christianity and Slavic Paganism
- "Krov koroley" tells the story of the last battle of King Arthur
- "Chuzhoy" is based on Ray Bradbury's short story "Zero Hour"
- "Posledny zakat" deals with World War III and nuclear war

== Personnel ==
- Arthur Berkut – Vocals
- Vladimir Holstinin – Guitar
- Vitaly Dubinin – Bass
- Sergey Popov – Guitar
- Maxim Udalov – Drums

Recorded on ARIA Records studio. Sound engineering by Dmitry Kalinin. Mastering by Andrey Subbotin and Saturday Mastering studio. Technical support by A&T Trade, Avallon, Mixart, Violet Design. Instruments by: Fender, Jackson, Ibanez, Marshall Amplifiers, DiMarzio, Korg, Shure, Dean Markley, Sabine, Tama, Zildjian, Violet Design.

Cover art by Leo Hao.
