= Proklyatiye morey =

Studio album by Aria
- Released: 13 November 2018
- Genre: Heavy metal
- Length: 75:27
- Label: М2БА
- Producer: Roy Z

Aria chronology
| Через все времена (2014) | Proklyatiye morey (2018) |

Professional ratings
Review scores
| Source | Rating |
|---|---|
| Darkside | 5/10 |

Проклятье морей (Curse of the Seas) is the thirteenth studio album by Russian heavy metal band Ария (Aria), released on 13 November 2018.

== Track listing ==
| No. | Title | Lyrics | Music | English title | Length |
|---|---|---|---|---|---|
| 1. | "Гонка за славой" | Alexander Yelin | Vitaly Dubinin | A Race for Glory | 4:53 |
| 2. | "Варяг" | Igor Lobanov | Vladimir Holstinin | Varangian | 6:38 |
| 3. | "Эра Люцифера" | Alexander Yelin | Sergey Popov | Lucifer's Era | 5:46 |
| 4. | "Трудно быть богом" | Igor Lobanov | Vladimir Holstinin | (It's) Hard to be a God | 6:42 |
| 5. | "Пусть будет так" | Margarita Pushkina | Mikhail Zhitnyakov, Vitaly Dubinin | Let It Be So | 5:14 |
| 6. | "Всё начинается там, где кончается ночь" | Margarita Pushkina | Vitaly Dubinin | All Starts There, Where the Night Ends | 5:21 |
| 7. | "Живой" | Margarita Pushkina | Sergey Popov | Alive | 8:55 |
| 8. | "Убить дракона" | Margarita Pushkina | Vitaly Dubinin | To Kill the Dragon | 5:45 |
| 9. | "Дым без огня" | Vladislav Tarasov | Vladimir Holstinin | A Smoke Without Fire | 7:45 |
| 10. | "От заката до рассвета" | Alexander Yelin | Sergey Popov | From Dusk Till Dawn | 6:18 |
| 11. | "Проклятье морей" | Margarita Pushkina | Vitaly Dubinin | Curse of the Seas | 12:05 |

== Clips ==
- To Kill the Dragon (2019)

== Personnel ==
=== Aria ===
- Mikhail Zhitnyakov - Vocals
- Vladimir Holstinin - Guitar
- Sergey Popov - Guitar
- Vitaly Dubinin - Bass
- Maxim Udalov - Drums

=== Others ===
- Roy Z - Producer, Mixing
- Maor Appelbaum - Mastering Engineer
- Margarita Pushkina - Lyrics
- Igor Lobanov - Lyrics
- Alexander Yelin - Lyrics
- Vladislav Tarasov - Lyrics
