= Cherez vse Vremena =

Cherez vse vremena

Studio album by Aria
- Released: 25 November 2014
- Genre: Heavy metal
- Length: 60:00
- Label: М2БА
- Producer: Vasily Filatov

Aria chronology
Феникс (2011)	Cherez vse vremena (2014)	Проклятье морей (2018)

Professional ratings
Review scores
Source	Rating
Darkside	7/10

Через все времена (Through All Times) is the twelfth studio album by Russian heavy metal band Ария (Aria), released on 25 November 2014.

== Track listing ==
All lyrics are written by Margarita Pushkina, except where noted

No.	Title	Lyrics	Music	English title	Length
1.	"Через все времена"		Vitaly Dubinin	Through All Times	5:42
2.	"Город"	Margarita Pushkina, Sergey Popov	Sergey Popov	City	7:12
3.	"Блики солнца на воде"		Vitaly Dubinin	Glare of the Sun on the Water	6:11
4.	"Не сходи с ума!"	Alexander Yelin	Sergey Popov	Don't Go Crazy!	5:31
5.	"Время затмений"		Vitaly Dubinin	Eclipse Time	4:30
6.	"Точка невозврата"		Mikhail Zhytnyakov, Vitaly Dubinin	Point of No Return	5:11
7.	"Ангелы неба"	Margarita Pushkina, Sergey Popov	Sergey Popov	Angels of Heaven	4:49
8.	"Атака мертвецов"		Vitaly Dubinin	Attack of the Dead	6:51
9.	"Зов бездны"		Vitaly Dubinin	Call of the Abyss	7:41
10.	"Бегущий человек"	Igor Lobanov	Vladimir Holstinin	Running Man	6:22

== Clips ==
- Point of No Return (2015)

== Personnel ==
=== Aria ===
- Mikhail Zhitnyakov – vocals
- Vladimir Holstinin – guitar
- Sergey Popov – guitar
- Vitaly Dubinin – bass
- Maxim Udalov – drums

=== Others ===
- Vasily Filatov – producer, mixing, mastering
- Margarita Pushkina – lyrics
- Igor Lobanov – lyrics, cover art
- Alexander Yelin – lyrics
