= Igra s ognyom =

Igra S Ognyom

Studio album by Aria
- Released: 1989
- Genre: Heavy metal
- Length: 39:42
- Label: Melodiya
- Producer: Vitaly Dubinin, Vladimir Holstinin

Aria chronology
| Герой Асфальта (1987) | Igra S Ognyom (1989) | Кровь За Кровь (1991) |

Professional ratings
Review scores
| Source | Rating |
|---|---|
| Darkside | 9/10 |

Игра С Огнём (Playing with Fire) is the fourth album by heavy metal band Aria. It is the first to feature new drummer Alexander Maniakin, and the first after the band split with their longtime manager Viktor Vekshtein. The title track "Playing with Fire", lasting 9 minutes and 4 seconds, held the duration record for 29 years (1989-2018), losing to the track "The Curse of the Seas" (12 minutes 5 seconds) from the album of the same name on November 13, 2018.

== Track listing ==
All lyrics are written by Margarita Pushkina; all music is composed by Vitaly Dubinin and Vladimir Holstinin.

| No. | Title | English title | Length |
|---|---|---|---|
| 1. | "Что вы сделали с вашей мечтой?" | What Have You Done To Your Dreams? | 5:22 |
| 2. | "Раскачаем этот мир" | Rock this World | 6:01 |
| 3. | "Раб страха" | Slave of Fear | 4:40 |
| 4. | "Искушение" | Temptation | 4:00 |
| 5. | "Игра с огнём" | Play with Fire | 9:04 |
| 6. | "Бой продолжается" | The Battle Goes On | 6:08 |
| 7. | "Дай жару!" | Get it Hot / Give 'em Hell | 4:25 |

== Personnel ==
- Valery Kipelov - Vocals
- Vladimir Holstinin - Guitar
- Sergey Mavrin - Guitar
- Vitaly Dubinin - Bass
- Aleksander Maniakin - Drums
- Ivan Evdolimov - Sound engineer
- Sergey Ryleev - Sound engineer
- Aria - Management
- Mikhail Mushnikov - Artist
- Vasily Gavrilov - Design artist
- Georgy Molivin - Photography
- Valentin Kudryatsev - Computer design
