= Smutnoye vremya =

Studio album by Valery Kipelov and Sergey Mavrin
- Released: 1997
- Genres: Heavy metal, hard rock
- Length: 60:34
- Label: Moroz records

Smutnoye vremya (Russian: Смутное время, lit. 'Time of Troubles') is a standalone album by vocalist Valery Kipelov and guitarist Sergey Mavrin, both formerly of Aria (Kipelov was still a member of Aria when it was released). Alik Granovsky, former Aria bassist, was a guest musician on "SV", but composed no songs for it. Songs from the album are still played both by Kipelov's group "Kipelov" and Mavrin's "Mavrin".

Although the major vein of the album is heavy metal, common for both artists, it also includes some slow ballads and even a "drunkard"-blues song, "Vypyem Yesho" (One More Drink).

Track #4, "Ya Svoboden" (I am Free), suddenly became a hit in 2003 when it was re-released by Kipelov and a music video was aired on MTV. The ballad topped Russian rock charts and was featured on MTV Russia's Top 20.

== Track listing ==
All lyrics are written by Margarita Pushkina, except where noted.

No.	Title	Lyrics	Music	English title	Length
1.	"Путь Наверх"		Kipelov	Way to the Top	7:13
2.	"Выпьем Ещё"		Kipelov, Mavrin, Berkut	One More Drink	5:49
3.	"Вот и Все Дела!"		Kipelov, Mavrin	Now That's All!	6:05
4.	"Я Свободен"	Pushkina, Kipelov	Kipelov	I am Free	7:29
5.	"Смутное Время"		Kipelov	Time of Troubles	6:44
6.	"Свет Дневной Иссяк"		Mavrin	Daylight is Gone	6:04
7.	"Castlevania"		Mavrin		6:06
8.	"Ночь в Июле"		Kipelov	A Night in July	7:16
9.	"Будем Жить, Мать Россия!"		Kipelov, Mavrin	We Will Survive, Mother Russia!	7:00
10.	"Кода"	(instrumental)	Mavrin	Coda	0:47

== Personnel ==
- Valery Kipelov (Aria) – vocals
- Sergey Mavrin – guitar, keyboard
- Alik Granovsky (Master) – bass
- Pavel Chinyakov – drums
- Galina Pavlova, Alexander Zotov, Olga Shumova, Mikhail Seryshev – choir (6)
- Sound engineering – Ivan Yevdokimov
- Photo – Nadir Chanishev
