= Shtil =

Shtil may refer to:

- Shtil', a space launch vehicle
- Shtil, a heavy metal song by Russian band Aria
- Schtiel, a rock song and cover of the Aria song by Till Lindemann and Richard Kruspe
- Shtil, a naval air defence missile of Soviet origin.
