= Generator zla =

Генератор Зла

Studio album by Aria
- Released: 1998
- Genre: Heavy metal
- Length: 55:13
- Label: Moroz Records
- Producer: Aria

Aria chronology
Ночь Короче Дня (1995)	Генератор Зла (1998)	Химера (2001)

Professional ratings
Review scores
Source	Rating
Darkside	9/10

Генератор Зла (Russian for Generator of Evil) is the seventh studio album by Russian heavy metal band Aria. The first album of the band, where there are no songs of the same name as the album (but, in the song “Behold!” there is a line “Наш ум - генератор зла” (eng. Our brain is a generator of evil)).

== Track listing ==
All lyrics are written by Margarita Pushkina

No.	Title	Lyrics	Music	English title	Length
1.	"Смотри!"	Margarita Pushkina	Vitaly Dubinin	Behold!	4:28
2.	"Грязь"	Pushkina	Sergey Terentyev, Valery Kipelov	Dirt	4:43
3.	"Дезертир"	Pushkina	Dubinin	Deserter	6:29
4.	"Пытка Тишиной"	Pushkina	Dubinin, Vladimir Holstinin	Torture by Silence	5:52
5.	"Беги За Солнцем"	Pushkina	Dubinin	Run After the Sun	6:11
6.	"Обман"	Pushkina	Dubinin, Holstinin	Deceit	5:17
7.	"Отшельник"	Pushkina	Dubinin	Hermit	5:37
8.	"Закат"	Pushkina	Kipelov	Sunset	4:50
9.	"Дьявольский Зной"	Pushkina	Terentyev	Diabolic Heat	4:53
10.	"Замкнутый Круг"	Pushkina	Holstinin	Closed Circle	6:48

== Personnel ==
- Valery Kipelov - Vocals
- Vladimir Holstinin - Guitar, Acoustic Guitar, Keyboards on Track 10
- Sergey Terent'ev - Guitar, Keyboards on Tracks 2, 9
- Vitaly Dubinin - Bass, Vocals, Keyboards on Tracks 1,3,5,7,8
- Aleksandr Maniakin - Drums
- Aria - Management
- Andrei Subbotin - Mastering
- Nadir Chan'shev - Photography
- Pavel Semenov - Design
