= Geroy asfalta =

Герой Асфальта

Studio album by Aria
- Released: 1987
- Genre: Heavy metal
- Length: 38:30
- Label: Melodiya
- Producer: Vitaly Dubinin, Vladimir Holstinin

Aria chronology
С Кем Ты? (1986)	Герой Асфальта (1987)	Игра с Огнём (1989)

Reissue cover

Singles from Geroy asfalta
- 1. "Street Of Roses" Released: 1987

Герой Асфальта (Russian for Hero of Asphalt) is the third album by heavy metal band Aria. It is the first album recorded by new lineup featuring Vitaly Dubinin and Sergey Mavrin. It was also their first album officially released by Soviet music publishing monopoly Melodiya — the previous two albums were self-releases. In 2012, on the website openspace.ru, it was voted as the most popular album of all times published by Melodiya.

== Track listing ==
All lyrics are written by Margarita Pushkina.

No.	Title	Music	English title	Length
1.	"На службе силы зла"	Vitaly Dubinin, Vladimir Holstinin	Serving Evil Force	7:10
2.	"Герой асфальта"	Dubinin, Sergey Mavrin	Hero of Asphalt	5:11
3.	"Мёртвая зона"	Valery Kipelov	Dead Zone	6:43
4.	"1100"	Holstinin	1100	4:55
5.	"Улица Роз"	Dubinin	Street of Roses	5:56
6.	"Баллада о древнерусском воине"	Dubinin, Holstinin	Ballad of an Ancient Russian Warrior	8:31
7.	"Дай руку мне (bonus on Cassette)"	Dubinin, Mavrin	Give Your Hand To Me	5:17

== Personnel ==
- Valery Kipelov - Vocals
- Vladimir Holstinin - Guitars
- Sergey Mavrin - Guitars
- Vitaly Dubinin - Bass
- MaXim Udalov - Drums
- Sergey Levshin - Sound Engineer
- Viktor Vekshtein - Manager
- Dmitrii Baushev - Artist
- Vasily Gavrilov - Design Artist
- Georgy Molitvin - Photography
- Valentin Kudryavtsev - Computer Design
