= Mania velichia =

Мания Величия

Studio album by Aria
- Released: 1985
- Genre: Heavy metal
- Length: 41:18
- Labels: self-publishing/magnitizdat (1985), Moroz Records (1994 reissue)
- Producers: Alik Granovsky, Vladimir Holstinin

Aria chronology
Мания Величия (1985)	С Кем Ты? (1986)

Professional ratings
Review scores
Source	Rating
Darkside	7/10

Mania Velichia (Russian: Мания Величия - Megalomania) is the debut album by heavy metal band Aria. One music video was made for this album: "Позади Америка" (Past America). The title track “Мания величия” (“Megalomania”) is the shortest composition by Aria at the moment (1 minute 49 seconds)

== Track listing ==
No.	Title	Lyrics	Music	English title	Length
1.	"Это Рок"	Alexander Yelin	Vladimir Holstinin, Alik Granovsky	This Is Fate	5:54
2.	"Тореро"	Margarita Pushkina	Granovsky	Torero	5:29
3.	"Волонтёр"	Yelin	Holstinin, Granovsky	Volunteer	8:24
4.	"Бивни Чёрных Скал"	Yelin	Granovsky	Tusks of Black Cliffs	4:51
5.	"Мания Величия"	(instrumental)	Kirill Pokrovsky	Megalomania	1:49
6.	"Жизнь Задаром"	Yelin	Holstinin, Granovsky	Life for Nothing	4:19
7.	"Мечты"	Yelin	Valery Kipelov	Dreams	5:16
8.	"Позади Америка"	Yelin	Holstinin, Granovsky, Pokrovsky	Past America	5:14

== Personnel ==
- Valery Kipelov - Vocals
- Vladimir Holstinin - Guitar
- Alik Granovsky - Bass
- Aleksander Lvov - Drums
- Kirill Pokrovsky - Keyboards

=== Additional personnel ===
- Viktor Vekshtein - Manager
- Vasily Gavrilov - Artist
- Aleksander Gavrilov - Artist
- Ekaterina Shevchenko - Design Artist

== Mania velichia. 30 let spustia ==
In 2015, heavy metal band “Aella” released a tribute album to Aria called “Mania velichia. 30 let spustia” (Megalomania. 30 years later), that includes all the songs of “Mania velichia”.
