= Cry for Freedom =

Single by White Lion

from the album Big Game
- A-side: "Cry for Freedom"
- B-side: "Dirty Woman"
- Released: February 1990
- Recorded: 1989
- Genre: Glam metal
- Length: 6:08 (album version); 4:15 (single version)
- Label: Atlantic
- Songwriter(s): Mike Tramp/Vito Bratta

White Lion singles chronology
"Radar Love" (1989)	"Cry for Freedom" (1990)	"Goin' Home Tonight" (1990)

"Cry for Freedom" is a power ballad song by American/Danish glam metal band White Lion. The song was released as the third single for their 1989 album Big Game which peaked at number 19 on The Billboard 200. The song was released in 1990 and charted at #19 on the Dutch singles charts.

== Background ==
"Cry for Freedom" is a political song about apartheid in South Africa and was one of many songs from the band that addressed social or political issues such as uprising to oppression.

The music video opens with black and white shots of a prison and its barred windows and then follows through a cemetery.

== Versions ==
In 2001, Russian heavy-metal band Ария (Aria) covered the song for their EP Tribute to Harley-Davidson II with translated lyrics.

In 2023 Mike Tramp re-recorded "Cry for Freedom" for the "Songs of White Lion" album, the song was released as the lead single.

== Track listing ==
7" single

1. "Cry for Freedom"- 6:08
2. "Dirty Woman"- 3:27

12" maxi-single

1. Cry for Freedom - 6:08
2. Dirty Woman - 3:27
3. Wait - 3:51

== Personnel ==
- Mike Tramp - vocals
- Vito Bratta - guitars
- James Lomenzo - bass guitar
- Greg D'Angelo - drums

== Charts ==
Chart (1990)	Peak position
Dutch Singles	19
