= Shtil' (disambiguation) =

Shtil' is a series of Russian space launch vehicles.

Shtil' (in Cyrillic: Штиль, Russian for "calm", may also refer to:

- "Shtil (Calm)", a 2001 song by the band Aria

== See also ==
- Stihl, a German manufacturer
