= Pertsev =

Pertsev (feminine: Pertseva, Russian: Перцев, Перцева) is a Russian-language surname. Notable people with the surname include:

- Alexey Pertsev, developer of Tornado Cash
- Andrey Pertsev, musician of the Russian band Chorny Kofe
- Dmitry Pertsev
- Natalia Pertseva, Russian footballer

== See also ==
- Pertsov
