= S Kem Ty? =

С Кем Ты?

Studio album by Aria
- Released: 1986
- Genre: Heavy metal
- Length: 35:31
- Label: self-publishing (1986), Moroz Records (1994 reissue)
- Producer: Alik Granovsky, Andrey Bolshakov

Aria chronology
| Мания Величия (1985) | С Кем Ты? (1986) | Герой Асфальта (1987) |

Professional ratings
Review scores
| Source | Rating |
|---|---|
| Darkside | 8/10 |

С Кем Ты? (Who Are You With?) is the second album by the Russian heavy metal band Aria. It is the last Aria album to feature Alik Granovsky and Andrey Bolshakov, who composed most of the music on it.

== Track listing ==
| No. | Title | Lyrics | Music | English title | Length |
|---|---|---|---|---|---|
| 1. | "Воля И Разум" | Alexander Yelin | Andrey Bolshakov | Will and Mind | 4:34 |
| 2. | "Встань, Страх, Преодолей" | Yelin | Bolshakov | Stand Up, Vanquish Fear | 4:16 |
| 3. | "Здесь Куют Металл" | Yelin | Alik Granovsky | Metal is Forged Here | 4:42 |
| 4. | "С Кем Ты?" | Yelin | Granovsky | Who Are You With? | 4:43 |
| 5. | "Без Тебя" | Margarita Pushkina | Valery Kipelov, Bolshakov | Without You | 4:24 |
| 6. | "Память О..." | (instrumental) | Granovsky | Memory of... | 2:49 |
| 7. | "Икар" | Yelin | Bolshakov | Icarus | 4:14 |
| 8. | "Игры Не Для Нас" | Yelin | Bolshakov | Games Are Not for Us | 5:47 |

== Personnel ==
- Valery Kipelov - vocals
- Vladimir Holstinin - guitar
- Andrey Bolshakov - guitar
- Alik Granovsky - bass
- Igor Molchanov - drums
- Kirill Pokrovsky - keyboards
- Aleksandr Lvov - sound engineer
- Viktor Vekshtein - manager
- Georgy Molitvin - photography
- Vladislav Provotorov - front cover
- Valentin Kudryavtsev - computer design
- Vasily Gavrilov - design artist
