= Shtil (song) =

2001 song by Aria

Single by Aria feat. Udo Dirkschneider

from the album Shtil
- Released: 2001
- Recorded: 2001
- Genre: Heavy metal
- Length: 4:50

"Shtil" (Russian: Штиль, lit. "Calm") is a song by Russian heavy metal band Aria from their 2001 album Chimera and their 2002 EP Calm.

== History ==
"Shtil" was originally recorded for Aria's Chimera album in 2001. It was recorded like a duet between Valery Kipelov and Udo Dirkschneider. The song is based on Jack London's short story "Francis Spaight" and tells of a ship's crew that is lost at sea and forced into cannibalism to prevent starvation.

A cover version of the song, titled "Schtiel", was recorded as a tribute to Harley-Davidson by Till Lindemann and Richard Kruspe in 2003.

== Personnel ==
- Music by Vitaly Dubinin
- Lyrics by Margarita Pushkina

== Till Lindemann and Richard Kruspe version ==
"Schtiel"

Single by Till Lindemann and Richard Kruspe
- Released: 30 August 2003
- Recorded: 2003
- Genre: Neue Deutsche Härte; Industrial metal
- Length: 5:12
- Producer(s): Richard Kruspe

Till Lindemann and Richard Kruspe, vocalist and guitarist of German industrial metal band Rammstein, respectively, covered the song and released it as a single. Lindemann sang the song completely in Russian. A demo-version of this song can be found online, and has an ID3 tag which suggests that it was a demo recorded during the Mutter era.

=== History ===
The song was released as a single in an unknown quantity of copies for the 2003 Harley Party in Moscow, celebrating the 100th anniversary of Harley-Davidson motorbikes. It was re-titled "Schtiel", so as to be pronounced properly in German, the language in which most of Rammstein’s songs are written. The entire lineup of Aria in 2003 all disliked the cover, and later sold their three copies on their online store; these are the only known copies to have made it out of the party in Moscow. Other copies that weren't distributed via the Harley Party were given to winners of an online quiz hosted by the Russian computer monitor company RoverScan.

In recent years, the rarity of this single has attracted many bootleggers who have sold illegitimate copies of the CD on online marketplaces. A minimum of 60 copies of the bootleg CD are thought to exist in parallel to less than ten copies of the authentic version which are known to exist.

=== Track listing ===
1. "Schtiel"
2. Miller Beer commercial (video)

=== Personnel ===
- Till Lindemann – lead vocals, drums
- Richard Kruspe – guitars, bass guitars, backing vocals
