= Pertsov =

Pertsov (feminine: Pertsova, Russian: Перцов, Перцова) is a Russian-language surname. Notable people with the surname include:

- Pyotr Pertsov, Russian poet, publisher, editor, literary critic, journalist and memoirist
- Stanislav Pertsov, Ukrainian competitive figure skater

== See also ==
- Pertsev
