= Maxim Udalov =

Russian musician (born 1966)

Maxim Lvovich Udalov
- Максим Львович Удалов
- Born: June 16, 1966 (age 58); Moscow, Soviet Union
- Known for: Drummer of the Russian heavy metal band Aria

Maxim Lvovich Udalov (Russian: Максим Львович Удалов, born June 16, 1966, in Moscow, USSR) is the drummer of the Russian heavy metal band Aria.

In his early career, Udalov participated in Chorny Coffee and Metallachord, where he met and befriended guitarist Sergey Mavrin. Together with Mavrin, Maxim first joined Aria in 1987 and played drums on Geroy Asfalta (1987), but he left the band two years later due to ongoing conflict between the musicians and the band's manager Victor Vekshtein. Alexander Maniakin replaced Udalov. Aria soon dismissed Vekshtein and started their own company ARIA records.

Even though he wasn't an official member, he remained in Aria as a sound engineer and a session drummer. He played drums on Aria's 1998 tour when Maniakin was injured with a broken hand. In 2002, when Maniakin left Aria following Valery Kipelov, Maxim was invited back to the main lineup.
