= Mavrin (Russian band) =

Mavrin (Маврин)
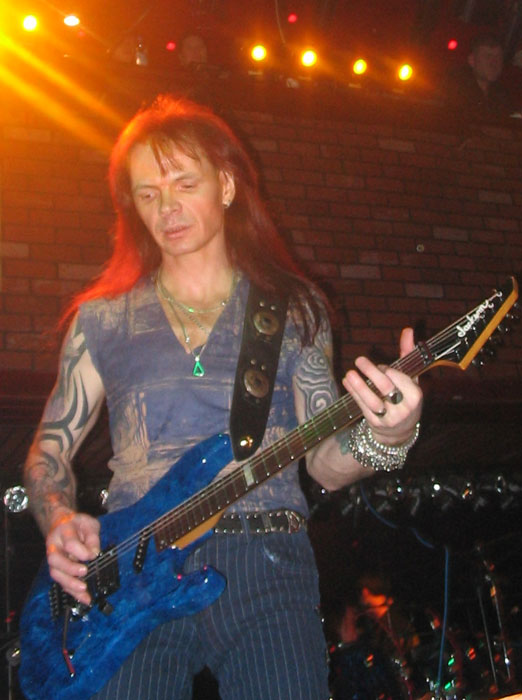
- Marvin(Russian band) - Sergey Mavrin in 2005

Background information
- Also known as: Mavrik (1997/1998-2001), Sergey Mavrin (2001-2009)
- Origin: Moscow, Russia
- Genres: Heavy metal, Progressive metal
- Years active: 1998 - present
- Labels: Classic Company (1998-2001), IronD (2001-2006), CD-Maximum
- Members: Sergey Mavrin, Evgeniy Kolchin; Yuri Alexeyev; Leonid Maksimov; Dmitiy Zavidov

Mavrin (Маврин), formerly known as Mavrik (Маврик), is a Russian heavy/progressive metal band formed and led by former Aria guitarist Sergey Mavrin.

== Foundation of Mavrin ==
Official Visions of Marvik logo

In 1997, Sergey offered to Kipelov (who was back in Aria) to record together the combined album, which might include their songs which were refused by Aria or did not fit into Aria's style. In 1997 they released the LP entitled Kipelov and Mavrin - Smutnoye Vremia ("Time of Troubles").

In 2000, the band released Neformat-1, which took the hard rock sound of Skitaletz in a more experimental direction.

During the recording of the third album, Himichesky Son ("Chemical Sleep", 2001), Artur Berkut often failed to show up in studio, and finally, Sergey had to fire him.

== Back to Mavrin ==
In 2004 Sergey Mavrin reunited his own band. Artem Styrov decided to come back, though Harkov stayed with Kipelov. Alexander Shwetz from the Russian band Nephilim became the new bass player. Mavrin and his band participated in Aria's twentieth-anniversary gig and the bands toured together in Ukraine in the winter of 2005. After it, Mavrin released a new album Otkrovenie ("Revelation").

== Band members ==
Current:

- Sergey Mavrin (lead guitar, keyboards)
- Evgeniy Kolchin (vocals)
- Yuri Alexeyev (rhythm guitar)
- Danila Naumov (drums)

Former members include:

- Arthur Berkut (vocals)
- Andrey Lefler (vocals)
- Ilya Lemur (vocals)
- Alexey Kharkov (bass)
- Pavel Elkind (drums)
- Stanislav Vitart (vocals)
- Alexander Mosinian (bass)
- Pavel Chinekov (drums)
- Alexander Schwetz (bass)
- Pavel Pazon (drums)
- Alexander Karpukhin (drums)
- Rinat Mukhametjanov (drums)
- Artem Styrov (vocals)
- Dmitiy Zavidov (drums)
- Nikita Marchenko (bass)

Timeline

== Discography ==
=== Albums ===
- Skitaletz (Wanderer, 1998)
- Neformat (Non-format, 2000)
- Himichesky Son (Chemical Sleep, 2001)
- Odinochestvo (Loneliness, 2002)
- Zapreshennaya Realnost (Forbidden Reality, 2004)
- Otkrovenie (Revelation, 2006)
- Live (2007)
- Fortuna (Fortune, 2007)
- Moya svoboda (My freedom, 2010)
- Protivostoyaniye (The Rivalry, 2012)
- Neotvratimoye (The Inevitable, 2015)

=== Singles ===
- Obratnaya Storona Realnosti (Other Side of Reality, 2005)
- Neformat 2 (Non-format 2, 2010)
- Illyuziya (Illusion, 2012)
