= Kipelov =

Russian band

Kipelov Кипелов
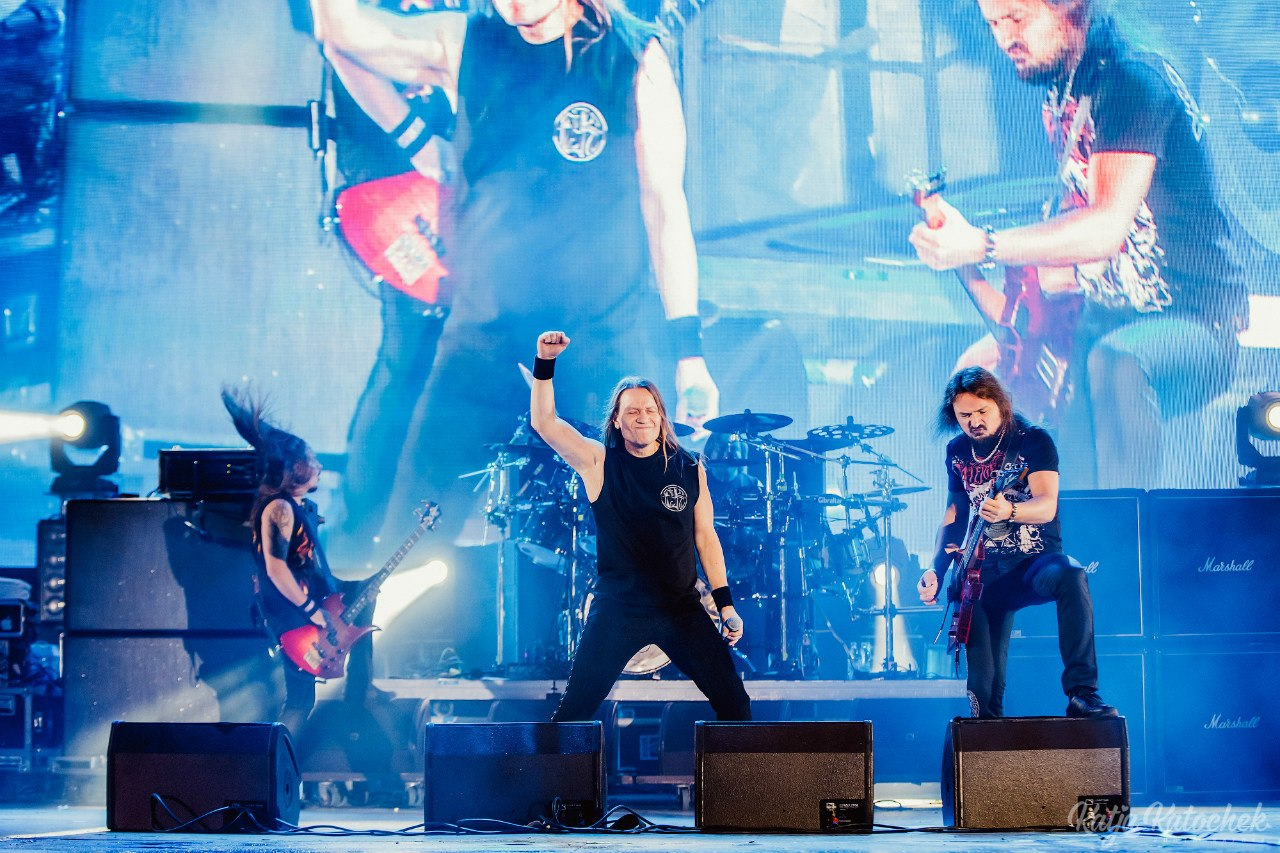
- Kipelov performing in 2014

Background information
- Origin: Moscow, Russia
- Genres: Heavy metal, hard rock
- Years active: 2002–present
- Labels: Русский Хит: Moroz Records; CD-Maximum; Мистерия Рекордс; Navigator
- Members: Valery Kipelov; Andrey Golovanov; Vyacheslav Molchanov; Alexander Maniakin; Alexey Harkov
- Website: kipelov.ru

Kipelov (Russian: Кипе́лов) is a Russian heavy metal band formed and led by former Aria vocalist Valery Kipelov.

== Origins ==
In 2002, dissension in the heavy metal band Aria led to Aria members Valery Kipelov (vocals), Sergey Terentyev (guitar), and Alexander Maniakin (drums) leaving the band and joining with former Aria member Sergey Mavrin and bassist Alexey Harkov of Mavrik to form Kipelov. The band was named to make use of the fame of its most well-known member, singer Valery Kipelov. Since Kipelov band was, essentially, just a revision of Aria, they were able to begin performing immediately.

In the fall of 2002, Kipelov toured through Russia, Ukraine, and Belarus, including a sold-out concert in Moscow at the end of November at the legendary Gorbunov Palace of Culture.

In May 2003, after a brief hiatus from touring, the group performed a concert in the open-air Voel Amphitheatre in Tel Aviv, Israel. On May 24, 2003, as part of a cultural program dedicated to the 300th anniversary of Saint Petersburg, the band performed a concert in Saint Petersburg Stadium. Video and audio versions of this concert were released.

== New members, venues, and material ==
On October 4, 2003, Kipelov unveiled a new set list featuring the song "Babylon" at a concert at Luzhniki Stadium in Moscow which was attended by over 10,000 people. "Babylon" soon rose to a high position on the Heath chart. Valery Kipelov described this concert as the most memorable event of his creative life.

Sergey Terentyev left the band shortly after this concert, in order to found his own band named Arteriya. He was replaced by former Strike and Legion guitarist Andrey Golovanov. The new lineup immediately resumed touring. In December 2003, a four-song CD with "Babylon", "Time of Troubles", and studio and live versions of "I am Free" was released through Moroz Records.

On March 6, 2004, a concert at Gorbunov Palace of Culture showcased the new line-up to Muscovites. The group continued active work at clubs and, in May, appeared again at newly renovated Saint Petersburg Stadium as part of the city's anniversary celebration.

== "Babylon" and "The Rivers of Time" ==
In September 2005, Kipelov released a video of "Babylon" directed by Vitaly Mukhametzyanov, who had previously directed videos for Linda, T.O.T.A.L., and others. This video achieved a high ranking on the MTV Russia charts, and the band received the "Most Promising Band of 2004" award at MTV Russia's Russian Music Awards.

In October 2004, Kipelov began another tour in Belarus, Ukraine, and Russia, after which Sergey Mavrin left the band to pursue a solo career. He was replaced by Victor Smolski from the German group Rage, and the band began working on a new studio album, The Rivers of Time.

The band worked on The Rivers of Time through the late winter, spring, and early summer of 2005, after which the album was mastered at Gernhart Studios in Germany. With the album mostly completed, Kipelov toured Belarus and Russia showcasing the new material, tour highlights including an appearances at LDS in Saint Petersburg and at Luzhniki Palace of Sports in Moscow, each concert attracting over 11,000 fans.

In December 2005, The Rivers of Time was released through CD-Maximum Records. In support of the release, Kipelov again toured in Russia, Ukraine, Belarus, and Israel. The ballad "Ya Zdes" ("I am Here") from the new album ranked high in radio charts. Vladimir Yankovskiy shot the video for this song at his Minsk studios. Yankovskiy, who has directed videos for Rage, cast Victor Smolski in the main role in this video.

The band released a new single, Na Grani, in March 2009.

== Band members ==
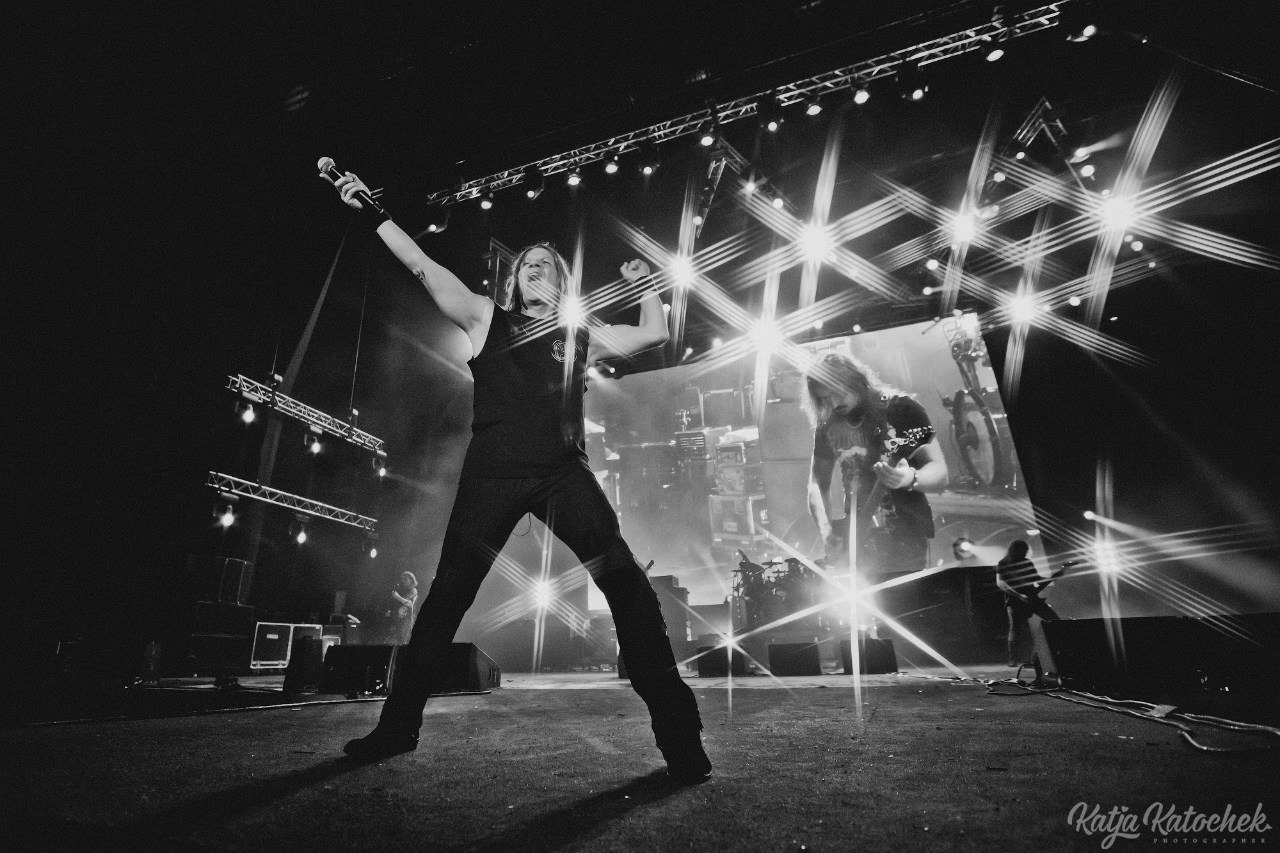
Valery Kipelov

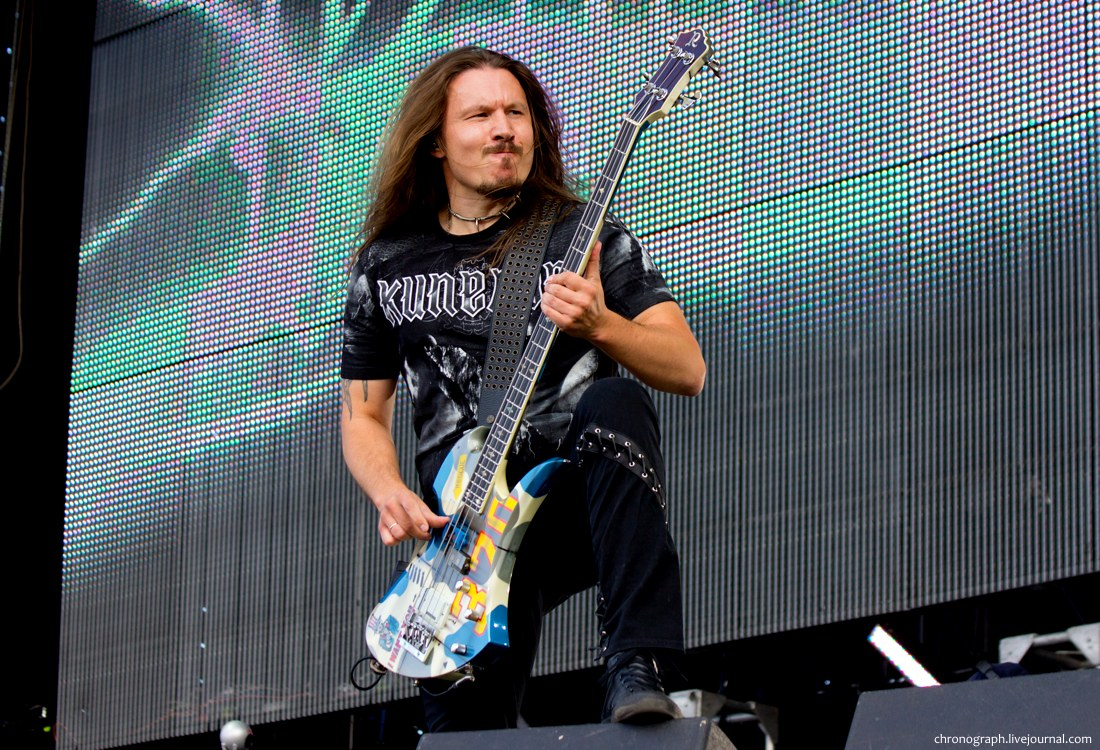
Alexey Harkov

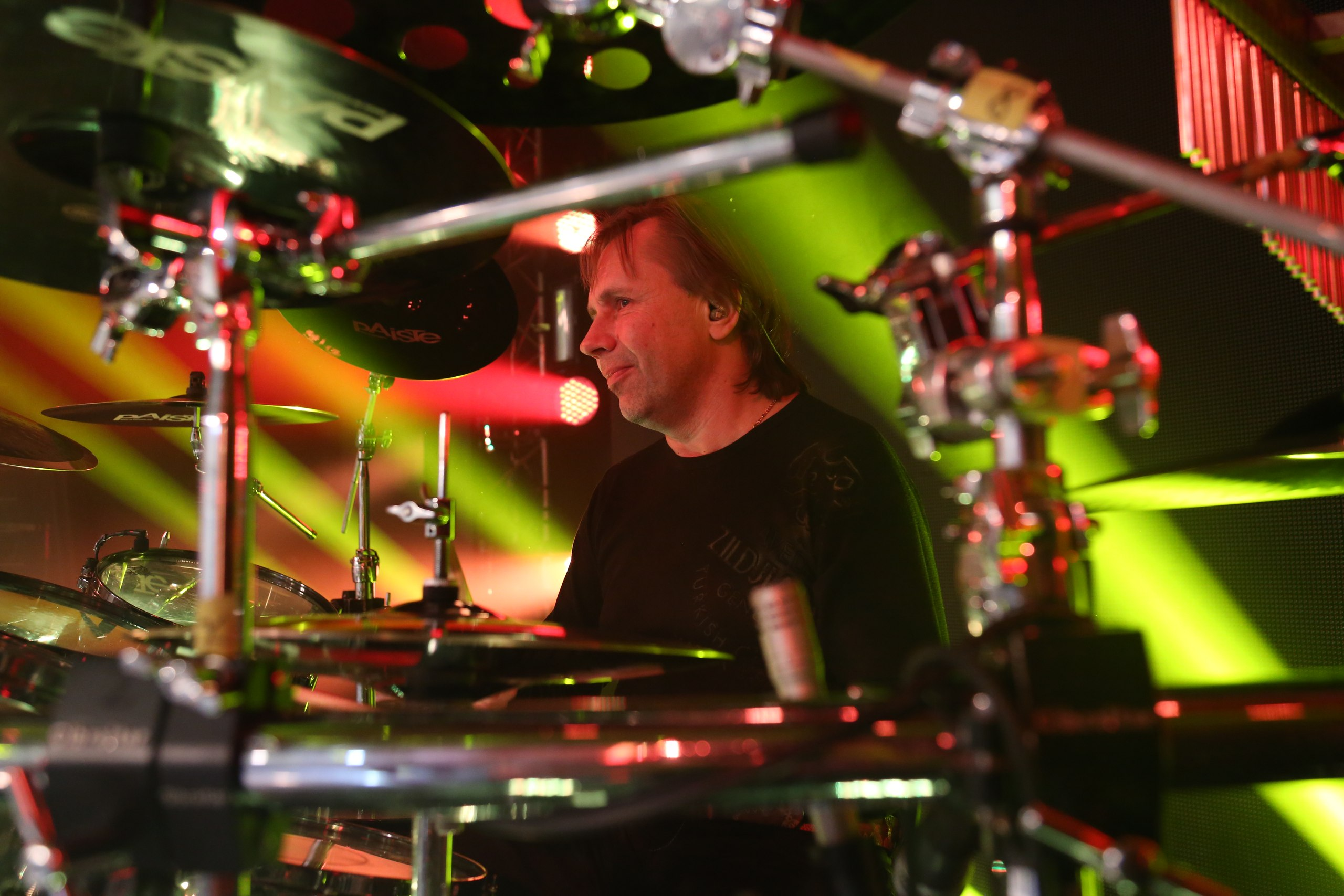
Alexander Maniakin

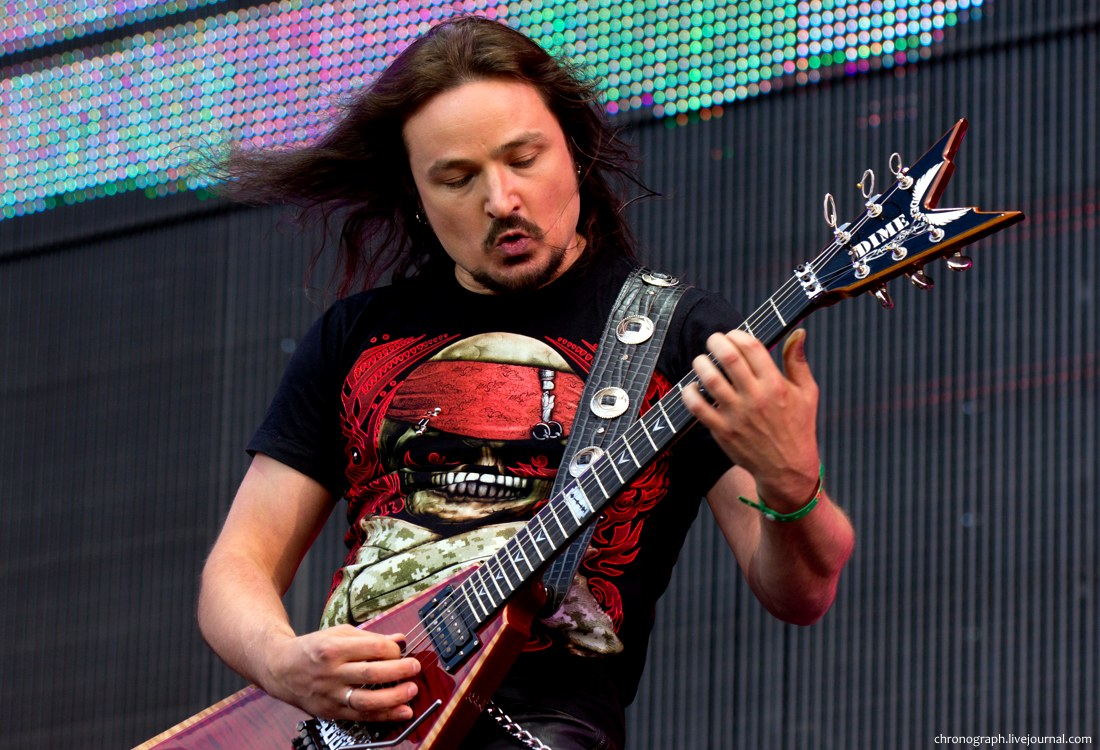
Andrey Golovanov

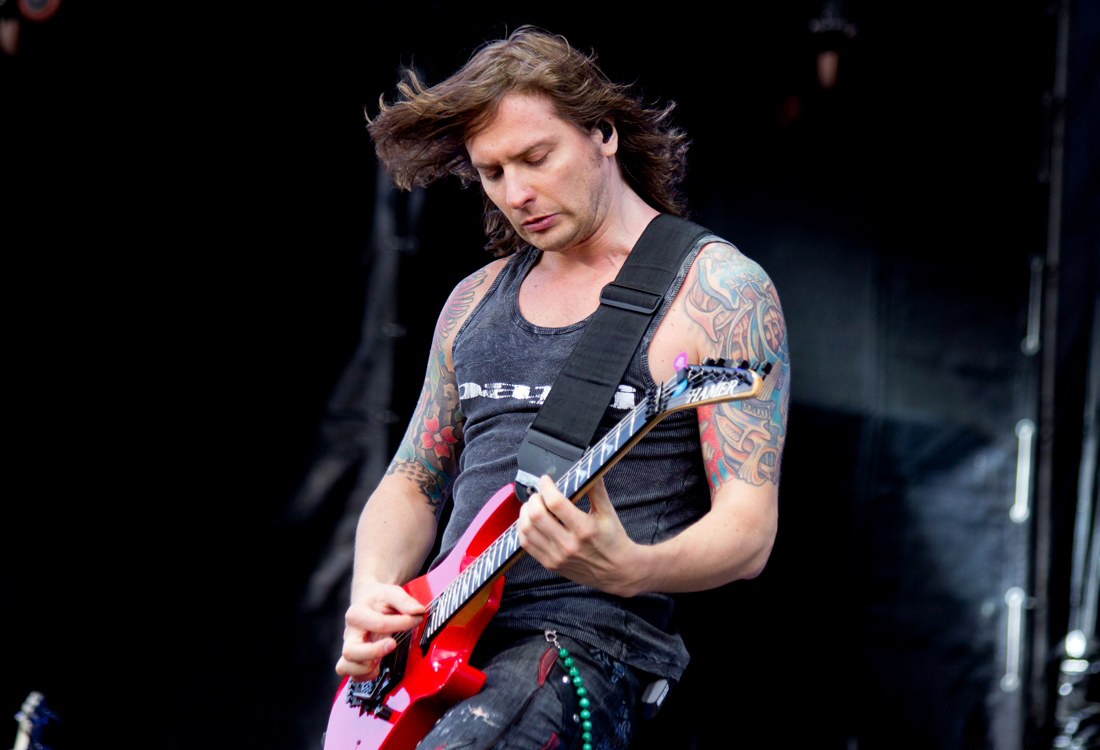
Vyacheslav Molchanov

== Chronology ==
- September 1, 2002 - Band formed.
- September 9, 2002 - kipelov.ru goes live.
- September 11, 2002 - first concert (St. Petersburg).
- October–December 2002 - 40-city tour.
- February 2003 - the group releases a re-make of the song "I Am Free", which reaches No. 1 on the Heath chart and remains there several months.
- May 24, 2003 - Video of St. Petersburg concert released.
- August 2003 - First album (The Way Up) released.
- October 4, 2003 - Appearance at Luzhniki, premiere of new song "Babylon".
- October 5, 2003 - Guitarist Sergey Terentyev quits.
- November 2003 - Andrey Golovanov replaces Terentyev.
- December 2003 - song "Babylon" reaches No. 1 on the Heath chart.
- February 2004 - Moroz Records releases a single of "Babylon".
- March 2004 - Concert debut of Golovanov in DK of Gorbunov .
- September 2004 - Video of "Babylon" is released.
- October 2004 - Group wins "Most Promising Band of 2004" at the MTV Russia Russian Music Awards.
- November 2004 - guitarist Sergey Mavrin quits.
- December 2004 - Victor Smolsky of the German band Rage joins a temporary replacement for Mavrin.
- 2005 - The album "Reki Vremen" ("Rivers of Time") is released.
- October 18, 2007 - 5-year anniversary concert at DS Luzhniki in Moscow. Premiere of new song "Monolog" ("Monologue").

== Discography ==
=== Official releases ===
- Put' Naverkh (рус. Путь наверх, Way Up) live album (2003)
- Vavilon (рус. Вавилон, Babylon) single (2004)
- Reki Vremyon (рус. Реки Времён, The Rivers of Time) debut album (2005) CD-Maximum
- Moskva 2005 (рус. Москва 2005, Moscow 2005) live album (2006)
- 5 Let (рус. 5 Лет, 5 Years) live album (2007)
- Na grani (рус. На грани, On The Edge) single (2009)
- Zhit' Vopreki (рус. Жить Вопреки, Living In Defiance) second album (2011), Misteria Records
- Otrazhenie (рус. Отражение, Reflection) EP (2013), Navigator Records
- Nepokorenniy (рус. Непокорённый, Unconquered) single (2015), Navigator Records
- Zvezdy i kresty (рус. Звёзды и кресты, Stars and Crosses) album (2017), Navigator Records

=== Other releases ===
- Smutnoye Vremia (рус. Смутное Время, Time of Troubles, 1997) - officially not considered a "Kipelov" release, but as a collaborative album by Valery Kipelov and Sergey Mavrin.
- Noch' v Iyule (рус. Ночь в Июле, Night in July, 2001) - a pirate bootleg.
