= Sergey Mavrin =

Russian musician (born 1963)

Sergey Mavrin Сергей Маврин
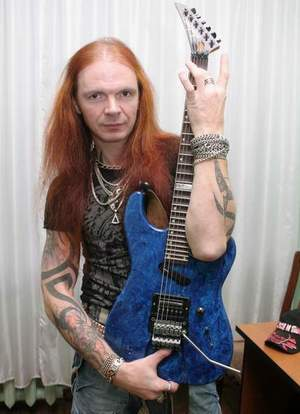

Background information
- Also known as: Маврик
- Born: 28 February 1963 (age 62); Kazan, USSR
- Genres: Heavy metal, progressive metal, hard rock
- Instrument(s): Guitar, keyboards
- Years active: 1985 – present
- Labels: IronD
- Website: http://mavrick.ru

Sergey Konstantinovich Mavrin (Russian: Сергей Константинович Маврин, born 28 February 1963), nicknamed "Mavrick" (Маврик), is a Russian musician and composer, who is credited as one of the best guitarists of the Russian metal scene. His music style combines heavy metal, progressive metal and hard rock, and is often dubbed "MavRock".

Sergey had been a member of Aria, Kipelov, Chorny Kofe, Metallachord and Nazad v Budusheye, and founded the band Mavrik (not to be confused with Maverick), though it is considered Mavrin's solo project since its latest albums are released with "Sergey Mavrin", not "Mavrik" named on the covers.

Since 2000, Sergey has had his own radio show, Iron Curtain, on Yunost radio channel. It is dedicated to rock music.

== Early life ==
Sergey was born in Kazan and has been a fan of rock music since his childhood. He mentions Led Zeppelin, Nazareth and Deep Purple as his early favorites. Mavrin studied to play the piano and electric guitar, though he never received formal music education. After military service, in 1985 Sergey participated in Chorny Kofe ("Black Coffee"), one of the first Soviet metal bands, and then joined Metallachord.

== In Aria ==
After the breakup of Aria's original lineup in 1987, Mavrin was invited to replace Andrey Bolshakov. He participated in three of the band's albums: Geroy Asfalta, Igra s Ognyom and Krov za Krov, which are considered Aria's 'classical era'. Though Sergey wrote very few songs for Aria, his guitar solos were one of the band's dignities.

After a tour in Germany the band nearly broke up when their vocalist Valery Kipelov tried to quit (Kipelov had to return because of his contract with Moroz Records, though). Protesting against it, Mavrin moved on to record an album with Alexey Bulgakov on vocals and left the band. He was replaced by Sergey Terentyev. Mavrin and Kipelov tried to start a band called Nazad v Budusheye ("Back to the Future"), but this project remained active only for two months. So as not to remain jobless, in 1996 Sergey played in the concert troupe of pop artist Dmitry Malikov.

== Foundation of Mavrik ==
In 1997, Sergey offered Kipelov (who was back in Aria) to record an album together, which could include their songs which did not fit Aria's style. In 1997 they released an LP entitled Kipelov and Mavrin – Smutnoye Vremia ("Time of Troubles"), which included 10 tracks.

Songs from this album became the main concert material for Sergey's new project: a band he started in 1998, which was entitled "Mavrik" due to his familiar nickname. Arthur Berkut (ex-Autograph) joined Mavrik as a vocalist on its first album Skitaletz (Wanderer), where Mavrin played guitars, bass and keyboards. The genre of the album was progressive/heavy metal. Vladimir Holstinin was a guest guitarist on 'Skitaletz'. Shortly after the album's release and subsequent touring, Berkut left the band, to be replaced by classically trained vocalist Stas Vytart.

In 2000, the band released Neformat-1, which took the hard rock sound of Skitaletz in a more experimental direction, while displaying some hints of heavier guitar sound on tracks such as "Staya" ("The Pack"), "Ei Chelovek" ("Hey Man"), and "V Dikom Pole" ("In the Wild Field"). However, Vytart's stage presence did not seem to fit with Mavrin's concept of the band's live show, and shortly after the album's release he was replaced by Berkut, who returned to the band and played assorted shows in support of the album.

During the recording of the third album, Himichesky Son ("Chemical Sleep", 2001), Artur Berkut often failed to show up in studio, and finally, Sergey had to fire him. When Berkut once was asked why did he left Mavrik, he replied: "You'd better ask Lena Mavrina about it," (meaning Sergey's wife). Artem Styrov was hired as the new vocalist. The album displayed a much heavier, guitar-oriented sound that was firmly within the heavy metal genre. Some of the songs are still live staples of Mavrin's set as of this writing. Since Chemical Sleep, all albums have been released under the title "Sergey Mavrin", not "Mavrik". This was done after consulting the IronD record label, which recommended them to take a more serious title.

== In Kipelov ==
After the "Judgement Day" breakup of Aria in 2002, Valery Kipelov, Sergey Terentyev and Alexander Maniakin formed the band Kipelov and Sergey decided to join it. Mavrik's bassist Alexey Harkov also merged into the new band. Mavrin participated in Kipelov's tour and in recording the Put Naverh live album and then the "Babylon" single. But seeing Kipelov not hurrying to record a new album, he departed in the summer of 2004. The song "Prorok" (Prophet) by Mavrin was included to Kipelov's The Rivers of Time and Kipelov was given a permission to play some of Mavrin's songs.

Mavrin:

'There were artistic differences. This is normal, a common situation for any band, here or in other countries. We were misunderstanding each other. I couldn't understand what he wanted, he couldn't understnand why I composed the songs, what I did. Artistic differences reached the boiling point and led personal relations to a dead end. We could have just been touring and still playing Aria's songs, taking care to nothing. But I longed for creativity. I wished it had been changed anyway. But it happened as it had to happen."

== Back to Mavrik ==
In 2004 Sergey Mavrin reunited his own band. Artem Styrov decided to come back, though Harkov stayed with Kipelov. Alexander Shwetz from the Russian band Nephilim became the new bass player. The same year Zapreshennaya Realnost ("Forbidden Reality") was released, which became the most commercially successful album for Mavrin. The band started touring all over Russia with the new material. In 2005 Styrov was dismissed due to his health problems – he struggled to sing the two-hour-long gigs. His successor was 18-year-old Andrey Lefler. Mavrin and his band participated in Aria's twentieth-anniversary gig and the bands toured together in Ukraine in the winter of 2005. After it, Mavrin released a new album Otkrovenie ("Revelation").

== Discography ==
=== Mavrik/Sergey Mavrin/Mavrin ===
- Skitaletz (Wanderer, 1998)
- Neformat (Non-format, 2000)
- Himichesky Son (Chemical Dream, 2001)
- Odinochestvo (Loneliness, 2002)
- Zapreshennaya Realnost (Forbidden Reality, 2004)
- Obratnaya Storona Realnosti (Other Side of Reality, 2005)
- Otkrovenie (Revelation, 2006)
- Live (2007)
- Fortuna (Fortune, 2007)
- Neformat 2 (Non-format 2, 2010)
- Moya svoboda (My freedom, 2010)
- Protivostoyanie (Opposition, 2012)
- Neotvratimoe (Inevitable, 2015)
- Geroy Asfalta 2015 (Hero Of Asphalt, 2015)
- Echoes (2015)
- Altair (2016)
- Сome together (2016)
- Metel (Blizzard, 2017)
- Beloe Solnce (White Sun, 2017)
- Nazad v Budushee (Back to the Future, 2018) (Cover EP)
- Strannoe Tango (Strange Tango, 2018)
- Idi i Smotri (Go and Look, 2021)
- Zapreshennaya Realnost 2023 (Forbidden Reality, 2023)
- Haos (Chaos, 2023)

=== Aria ===
- Geroy Asfalta (Hero of Asphalt, 1987)
- Igra s Ogneom (Playing with Fire, 1989)
- Krov za Krov (Blood for Blood, 1991)

=== Kipelov ===
- Smutnoye Vremia (Time of Troubles, 1997)
- Put Naverh (Way to the Top, 2003)
- Vavilon (Babylon, 2003)
