= Leo Hao =

Russian artist

Alexey Mikhailovich Shamrovsky (Russian: Алексей Михайлович Шамровский) better known as Leo Hao is a Russian fantasy artist. He is famous for painting cover art and illustrations for fantasy books and metal albums.

== Works ==
- numerous cover arts and wallpapers for Aria
- cover arts for Blind Guardian
- cover arts for Iron Mask
- cover arts for Iced Earth
- cover art for Nocturnal Rites' album New World Messiah
- cover arts for Yuri Nikitin's books
- illustrations to Nick Perumov's novels
- cover arts to Sergey Lukyanenko's books.
- piece of art for Heroes V (First prize in official art contest)
