= Master (Russian band) =

Russian thrash metal band

Мастер
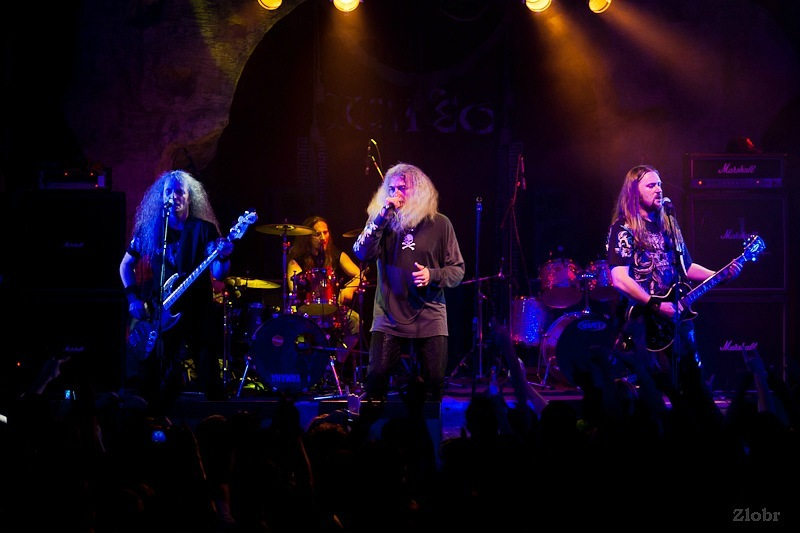
- Master in 2011

Background information
- Origin: Moscow, Russia
- Genres: Thrash metal, speed metal, heavy metal, groove metal
- Years active: 1987–present
- Labels: CD Maximum
- Members: Alik Granovsky; Lexx; Leonid Fomin; Alexander "Gips"

Master (Russian: Мастер) is a Russian thrash metal band founded in 1987 by former members of Aria.

== History ==
In 1987, Alik Granovsky, Andrey Bolshakov, Kirill Pokrovsky, and Igor Molchanov left the heavy metal band Aria, due to their conflict with the producer Victor Vekshtein. Vocalist Mikhail Seryshev and guitarist Sergey Popov joined them to play live concerts. Their first self-titled release was half-completed by Aria's songs written by Granovsky and Bolshakov, but the rest of the songs were completely different in style. Master turned away from Aria's NWOBHM-like style to speed metal and thrash metal. The second album showcased this change, featuring hard aggressive riffs and fast tempos.

In 1991, Seryshev assumed the role of Jesus in the Russian version of the rock opera Jesus Christ Superstar by Andrew Lloyd Webber.

The next two albums with English lyrics continued in a traditional thrash metal style. In 1993, Andrey Bolshakov left the band. The following album Songs of the Dead turned out to have a more modern, groove metal sound, and the band returned to Russian as the language of their lyrics. Since then, Master has gone away from the thrash metal of their earlier works, and their new albums bear more heavy/power spirit.

In 1997, Seryshev dismissed the French tour. Master toured with Arthur Berkut on vocals, but after the tour Popov, Tony Shender (drums) and he left Master and started a new band called Zooom. In 2004, Alik Granovsky released a solo album, Bolshaya progulka. In 2004, Lexx participated in the metal opera Elven Manuscript by Epidemia.

In January 2008, Alexey Strike and Alexander Karpuhin left the band. Leonid Fomin, Andrey Smirnov, and Oleg Khovrin became the band's new members. The studio album VIII was released in 2010.

In 2011, Andrey Smirnov and Oleg Khovrin left the band. Alexander "Gips" took over the drums and Leo Fomin remained the only guitarist. Smirnov later played in the band Everlost, before joining former Accept singer Udo Dirkschneider's band U.D.O. in 2013.

== Discography ==
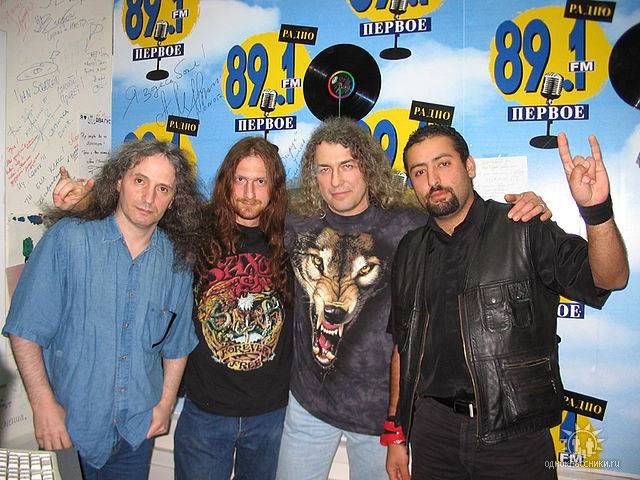
Band members, c. 2009

=== Albums ===
- 1987 – Мастер (Master)
- 1989 – С петлёй на шее (S petlyoy na sheye — With a Lee on the Neck)
- 1992 – Talk of the Devil
- 1994 – Maniac Party
- 1996 – Песни мёртвых (Pesni myortvih – Songs of the Dead)
- 2000 – Лабиринт (Labyrinth)
- 2004 – 33 жизни (33 zhizni – 33 Lives)
- 2005 – По ту сторону сна (Po tu storonu sna — The Other Side of a Dream)
- 2010 – VIII
- 2020 – Мастер времени (The Master of Time)

=== Other releases ===
- 1995 – Live
- 1997 – The Best. Kontsert v Moskve '97 (The Best. Concert in Moscow '97) (also released as Live 97)
- 2001 – Klassika 1987–2002 (Classics of 1987–2002)
- 2001 – Tribute to Harley-Davidson
- 2005 – Akustika (Acoustics)
- 2008 – XX let (XX Years)

== Band members ==
=== Current ===
- Alexey "Lexx" Kravchenko – vocals (1999–present)
- Leonid Fomin – guitars (1998–2000, 2011–present)
- Alik Granovsky – bass (1987–present)
- Alexander Bychkov – drums (2011–2013, 2016–present)

=== Former ===
- Mikhail Seryshev – vocals (1987–1999)
- Andrey Bolshakov – guitars (1987–1993)
- Sergey Popov – guitars (1987–1991, 1994–1997)
- Vyacheslav Sidorov – guitars (1992–1993)
- Alexey Strike – guitars (2000–2008)
- Andrey Smirnov – guitars (2008–2010)
- Igor Molchanov – drums (1987–1992; died 2025)
- Tony Shender – drums (1993–1997)
- Oleg Milovanov – drums (1998–2000)
- Alexander Karpukhin – drums (2000–2008)
- Oleg Khovrin – drums (2008–2010)
- Alexey Baev – drums (2013–2016)
- Kirill Pokrovsky – keyboards (1987–1991, 2008–2010; died 2015)
