= Chorny Kofe =

Russian heavy metal band

Чёрный Кофе Chorny Kofe
- Origin: Moscow, Soviet Union
- Genres: Heavy metal, Christian metal, speed metal, hard rock, glam metal
- Years active: 1979–present
- Labels: Misteriya Zvuka, Moroz Records, Nikita.ru
- Members: Dmitry Varshavskiy (vocals, guitar), Ivan Mikhailov (bass), Dmitriy Zavidov (drums)
- Past members: Igor Kupriyanov, Fedor Vasiliev, Oleg Avakov, Andrey Shatunovskiy, Sergey Chernyakov, Anatoly Abramov, Andrey Pertsev, Boris Dolgih

Chorney Kofe (Russian: Чёрный Кофе, lit. 'Black Coffee') is a Russian heavy metal band active since 1981. It is led by guitarist and singer Dmitry Varshavsky, and was founded by him.

== Members ==
Current

- Dmitry Warsaw - vocals, guitar (1979–present)
- Eugene Warsaw - bass guitar (2015–present)
- Andrew Prefix - drums (2009–present)

Former

- Paul Rizhenkov - bass guitar (1979-1981)
- Mikhail Shevtsov - keyboards (1979-1986)
- Alexey Korobkov - drums (1981-1982)
- Fyodor Vasilyev - bass guitar (1981-1986, 1990-1991, 1998-2002)
- Andrew Shatunovskii - drums (1984, 1986, 1990)
- Yuri Causeway - bass guitar (1984)
- Sergey Mavrin - guitar (1985-1986)
- Maxim Oudalov - drums (1985-1986)
- Andrew Hirnyk - bass guitar (1986) †
- Alexander Bondarenko - drums (1986)
- Andrei Rodin - drums (1986)
- Sergey Chernyakov - drums (1986-1988) †
- Igor Kupriyanov - bass guitar, vocals (1986-1990)
- Stas Bartenёv - Guitar (1987)
- Sergey Kudishin - rhythm guitar (1987, 1988)
- Igor Andreev - rhythm guitar (1987-1988)
- Andrew Peppers - drums (1988-1992) †
- Boris Dolgikh - keyboards (1989, 1996)
- Dmitry Gorbatikov - Guitar (1990)
- Konstantin Veretennikov - guitar (1991-1992, 1999)
- Pavel Markin - drums (1994-1995)
- Alexander Bach - drums (1996)
- Anatoly Abramov - drums (1998-2000, 2002-2007)
- Paul Smeyan - keyboards, bass guitar (1998-2008) †
- Sergey Efimov - drums (2000)
- Sergey Dorovskoi - rhythm guitar (2000-2001)
- Sergey Pochitalov - drums (2000-2002)
- Yuri Mahin - bass guitar (2002-2005)
- Ivan Mikhailov - bass guitar (2006-2008)
- Nikolai Large - bass guitar (2008-2013)
- Dmitry Zawidow - drums (2007-2008)
- Alexander Karpuhin - drums (2008)
- Svyatoslav Chernuha - drums (2008-2009)
- Vyacheslav Yadrikov - bass guitar (2010)
- Lev Gorbachev - bass guitar (2013-2015)
- Alexey Fetisov - bass guitar (2014)
- Denis Ovchinnikov - bass guitar (2016)

== Discography ==
- 1984 — "Pridi I Vse Vozmi" (Приди и всё возьми; Come And Take Everything)
- 1985 — "Sladky Angel" (Сладкий ангел; Sweet Angel) - DEMO Album
- 1984/1986 — "Svetliy Metall" (Светлый металл; Bright Metal)
- 1987 — "Cherniy Kofe" (Чёрный кофе; Black Coffee) - DEMO Album
- 1987 — "Perestupi Porog" (Переступи порог; Step Over the Threshold)
- 1989 — "Vol'nomu-Volya" (Вольному — воля; Freedom for the Free)
- 1991 — "Golden Lady"
- 1992 — "Lady Osen'" (Леди Осень; Lady Autumn)
- 1996 — "Pyanaya Luna" (Пьяная луна; Drunk Moon)
- 2002 — "Beliy Veter" (Белый ветер; White Wind)
- 2004 — "Oni Besi" (Они бесы; They are Demons)
- 2007 — "Александрия" (Alexandria)
- 2009 — "Putevka V Ad" (Путёвка в Ад; Voucher to hell)
- 2013 — "Chest i Vernost" (Честь и Верность; Honour and Fidelity )
- 2013 — "Osennij Albom" (Осенний альбом; Autumn Album)
