= Autograph (Russian band) =

Soviet Russian rock band

Автограф Autograph
- Origin: Moscow, Soviet Union
- Genres: Art rock, progressive rock
- Years active: 1979–1990 (reunions in 2005 and 2012)
- Label: Melodiya

Autograph (Russian: Автограф, or Avtograf) was a Soviet Russian art rock/AOR band, considered a pioneer of progressive rock music in Russia.

== History ==
The group was founded in Moscow in 1979 by Alexander "Sasha" Sitkovetsky, and achieved a considerable success at the first Soviet state-sanctioned rock festival held in Tbilisi, Georgia with Sitkovetsky's songs "Fasten Seat Belts", "Ireland. Ulster" and "Blues Caprice". In 1982 vocalist Arthur Berkut joined the band to finalize the lineup:

- Arthur Berkut – lead vocal
- Alexander Sitkovetsky – guitar, vocals
- Leonid Makarevich – keyboards
- Leonid Goutkin – bass
- Victor Mikhalin – drums, vocals

Autograph was atypical for a Russian rock band, playing more instrumental-based sound and much less symbolist lyrics. They are credited as a pioneering Soviet progressive/art rock/AOR band.

After a triumphal success and exhaustive touring throughout the USSR, Autograph became the first Soviet rock-group to achieve commercial success in the West, having toured more than 30 countries. On 13 July 1985, the band - the only one to represent the entire Eastern Europe - took part in Bob Geldof's Live Aid concert, performing before more than 2.5 billion people worldwide (transmitted live from Moscow). The signature song they performed was "Нам нужен мир" (or "Nam Nuzhen Mir - We Need Peace").

In 1987 the band represented the USSR in the Soviet-American concert Our Move organized by Bill Graham with Santana, The Doobie Brothers, Bonnie Raitt and James Taylor as featured artists. Autograph also performed at numerous international festivals along with John McLaughlin, Murray Head, Kenny Rogers, Tom Cochran, Glass Tiger, Ten Years After, Southside Johnny & the Asbury Jukes; opened for Chicago; worked closely with David Foster in Canada and Moscow, became a winner of the Sopot International Song Festival 1987 contest in Poland bringing home coveted independent press and audience awards as well as the best song prize for Sitkovetsky's "The World Inside". They also came to Quebec city at the occasion of Rendez-vous '87.

After two years working successfully with an American manager Mary Becker, in 1989 the band signed a contract with Herb Cohen (the former manager of Frank Zappa and Tom Waits) in Los Angeles, California. Their debut album Tear Down the Border on Bizarre/Straight Records was released in 1991 and promptly flopped.

Disbanded after failing to gain any traction in the United States, Autograph reunited in summer of 2005 for a major re-union tour and a final grand anniversary concert at Moscow Olympic Stadium. This historical event attracted thousands of the legendary band's fans and was the first ever to be held in 'live-surround' format in Russia. The Autograph - 25 Years DVD and a live CD were released soon after.

In 2012 the band played in a unique 'Legends of Russian Rock' concert at Moscow's Green Theater, broadcast on the national and international TV.

== Discography ==
=== Studio albums ===
- Rok-Gruppa "Avtograf" (1984)
- Avtograf (1985)
- Kamenniy Kray (1989)
- Tear Down the Border (1991)
- Avtograf-1 (1996)
