= Margarita Pushkina =

Russian lyricist, writer and singer

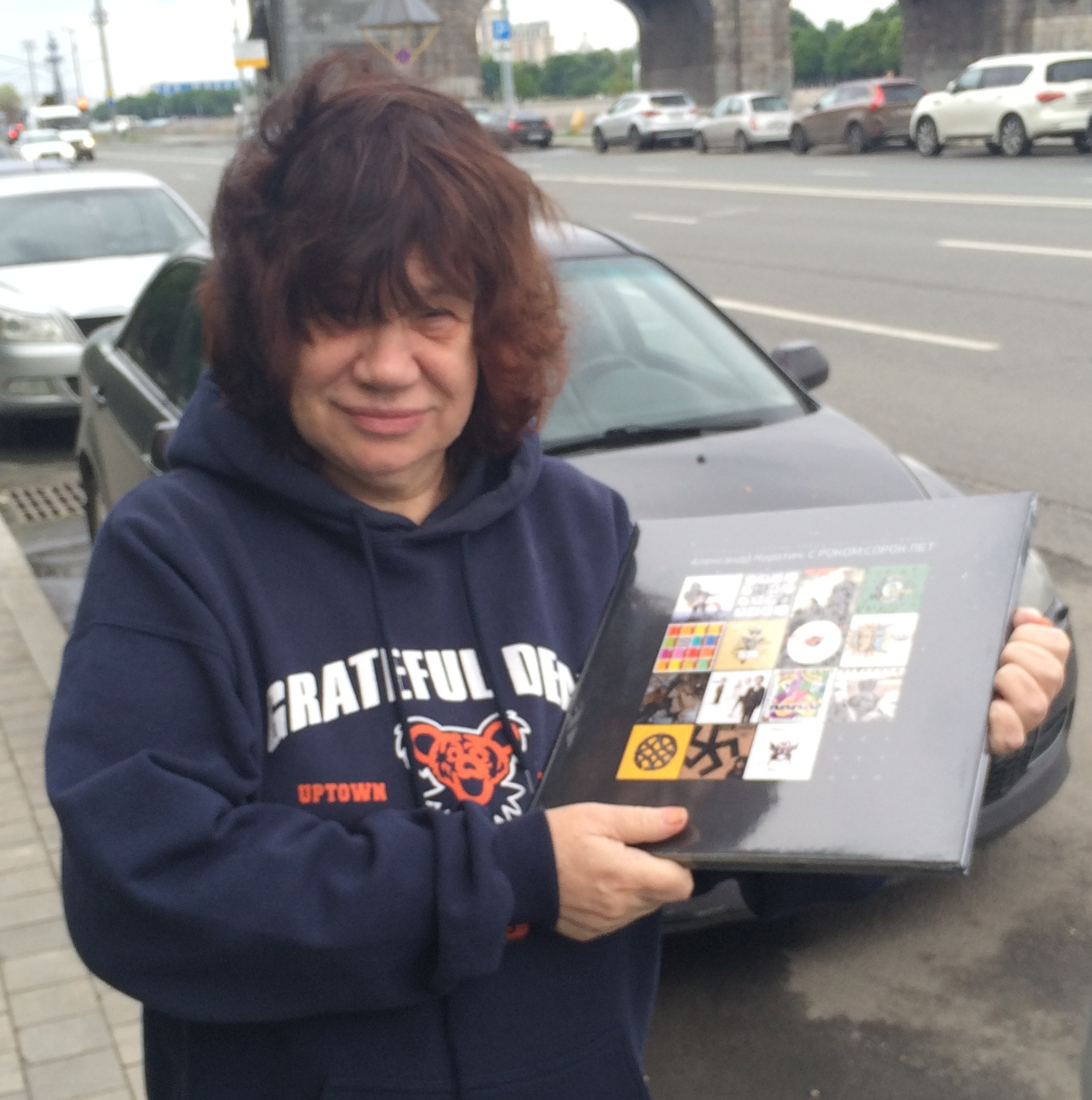
- Pushkina in 2016
- Born: Tbilisi, Soviet Union
- Occupations: Lyricist, writer, singer

Margarita Anatolyevna Pushkina (Russian: Маргарита Анатольевна Пушкина) is a Russian lyricist, writer and singer. She has written lyrics for several Soviet and Russian heavy metal groups, including Aria, Master and Kipelov.

== Early life and career ==
Pushkina was born in Tbilisi, Georgia. Her father, Anatoly Ivanovitch Pushkin, was made a Hero of the Soviet Union for his service as a bomber pilot. Her sister Tamara Anatolyevna Pushkina, who holds a Ph.D. equivalent in archaeology, was a strong influence on her early life and development.

Pushkina has an advanced education and has worked as a lecturer of English and Spanish. She is a close friend of Alexander Gradsky, ad co-wrote the rock opera "Stadion" ("Stadium") with him in 1985.

Pushkina was interested in rock music and bardic poetry from a young age. She wrote her first song lyric in 1970, Everyone Must Fish The Sun Out Of The Water Once for Alexander Kutikov. In 1976, Kutikov introduced Pushkina to the rock group Leap Summer, and this began her career of writing for rock musicians.

== Later work ==
Since 1985 Pushkina works with Aria and its later offshoot Kipelov, and with Master, Catharsis, Autograph, and other bands.

Pushkina wrote the book The Legend Of The Dinosaur about Aria, and later published a book about the drafts and lyrics of Aria's songs.

In 1992, Pushkina founded the music magazine Zabriskie Rider, dedicated to the alternative underground scene in Europe, the United States, and Russia. The name of the magazine was derived by combining the titles of two movies, Zabriskie Point and Easy Rider.

Pushkina prefers writing lyrics for heavy metal bands but also works with musicians in other genres. She is the author of the famous Soviet song Locking The Circle. Pushkina's lyrics are very sophisticated and intelligent, touching on many historical and philosophical issues. Her verses are sometimes written in English or Spanish as well as Russian.

== The Margenta project ==
Pushkina has created or headed several projects, but all under the aegis of a larger project named "Margenta" (this being Pushkina's nickname). A common theme of these projects is that the lyrics are written first and the music developed for the lyrics, rather than the other way round as is done by many musicians.

The band Margenta was founded in 2003 with the support of many other creative musicians, singers, and other people. In 2006 Pushkina and others released the concept album On The Other Side Of The Dream.

In 2007 Pushkina started her own musical project (under the aegis of the Margenta project) named "The Dynasty of the Adherents", which included participation from Arthur Berkut, Valery Kipelov, Sergey Mavrin, Sergey Terentyev, Sergey Skripnikov, and others.

In 2009 the Margenta project released two albums: The Dynasty Of The Adherents: Savonarolas’s Children and Against Despair. On 6 April 2010, Pushkina released the single The Flower Of Marjoram which will be part of the forthcoming third album by The Dynasty of the Adherents.

== Publications ==
- Pushkina, Margarita (1990). Buried Alive In Rock. Moscow: Independent Press Crematorium.
- Pushkina, Margarita (2000). Get Off Of My Cloud. Moscow: Арокс.
- Troy, Troy; Troegubov, V; Pushkina, Margarita (2001). Aria: The Legend Of The Dinosaur. Moscow: Леан.
- Pushkina, Margarita (2004). Margo's Aria. Moscow: Нота–Р.
- Pushkina, Margarita; et al. (2005). Russian Rock Poets. St. Petersburg: Азбука–классика.
- Pushkina, Margarita (2007). The Dynasty Of The Adherents. Moscow: Нота–Р.

== Discography ==
=== Albums ===
- They Stopped Flying (Otletalis) (2003)
- On the Other Side of the Dream (2006) – Master & Margenta
- The Dynasty of the Adherents (2007)
- The Dynasty of The Adherents: Savonarolas’s Children (2009)
- Against Despair (2009)
- The Dynasty of the Adherents: Sic Transit Gloria Mundi (2013)

=== Singles ===
- The Flower of Marjoram (2010)
