= Aria (band) =

Russian heavy metal band

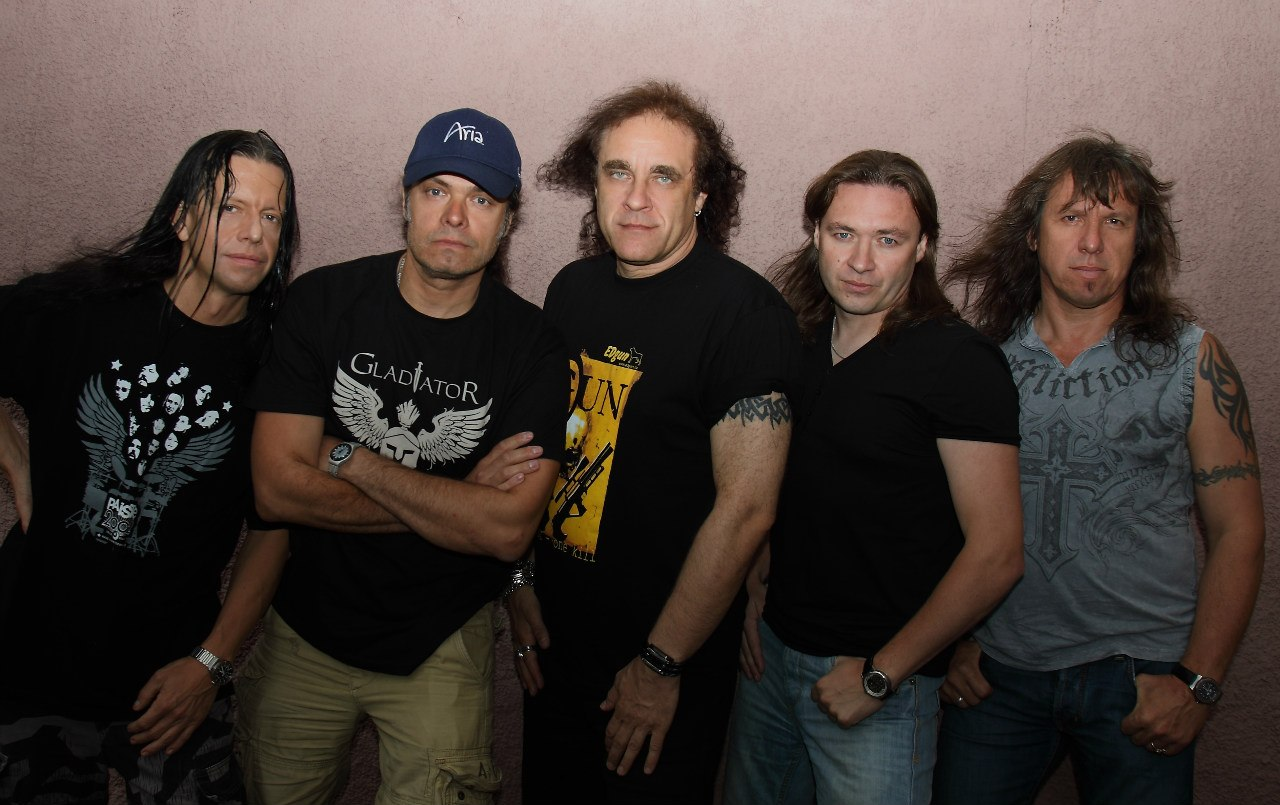
- Left to right: Udalov, Popov, Holstinin, Zhitnyakov, Dubinin (2013)

Background information
- Origin: Moscow, Russian SFSR, Soviet Union
- Genre: Heavy metal
- Years active: 1985–present
- Labels: Moroz, CD Maximum, M2БА
- Spinoffs: Kipelov, Master, Mavrin
- Members: Vladimir Holstinin; Vitaly Dubinin; Mikhail Zhitnyakov; Sergey Popov; Maxim Udalov
- Past members: Valery Kipelov; Sergey Mavrin; Sergey Terentyev; Alik Granovsky; Andrey Bolshakov; Alexander Maniakin; Arthur Berkut; Kirill Pokrovsky
- Website: www.aria.ru

Aria (Russian: Ария, romanized: Ariya) is a Russian heavy metal band that was formed in 1985 in Moscow. Although it was not the first Soviet band to play hard rock, Aria was the first to break through to mainstream media and commercial success. According to several public polls, Aria ranks among top 10 most popular Russian rock bands. Their sound heavily emulated that of NWOBHM bands, for which they were dubbed the "Russian Iron Maiden" in the media.

The band has most of its lyrics written by professional poets, Margarita Pushkina and Alexander Yelin commonly, and not by its band members. Since the band was founded, several of its founder members have gone on to form bands of their own resulting in Aria becoming the root of the so-called "Aria Family". Master, a band formed by four ex-members of Aria, is one of the most influential Russian metal bands. Metal Injection called them "the top dog of Russian metal". Kipelov is another example of a band formed by lead vocalist Valery Kipelov, who remained with the band til 2002.

== History ==
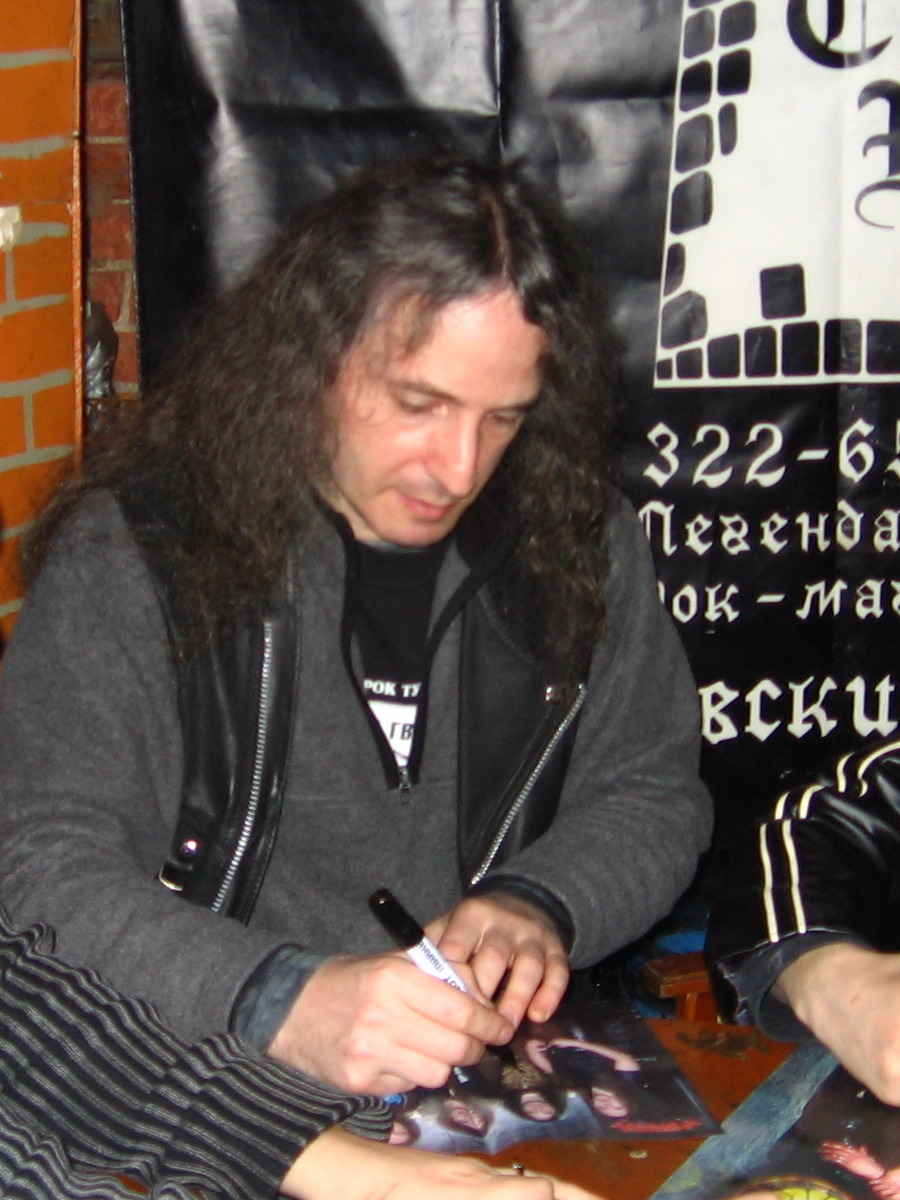
Alik Granovsky, co-founder of Aria and Master, in 2006

=== Early days ===
The band was founded by Vladimir Holstinin and Alik Granovsky, two members of the VIA Poyushchie Serdtsa (Singing Hearts). They both had played in the band Alpha, dissolved by that time. Holstinin's idea of creating a heavy metal band was accepted by Granovsky. They asked Victor Vekshtein to be the band's manager and allow them to use his studio. The vocalist position was soon filled by Valery Kipelov.

The name Aria was given to the band because it was short, catchy and easily transliterated. There is a version that the band's name was thought up by Holstinin, who owns a guitar from the eponymous manufacturer. Both fans and members of Aria are often informally referred to as "ariytsi" (Russian for Aryans).

In November 1986, Aria released their second album, Who Are You With?.

=== Rise to fame ===
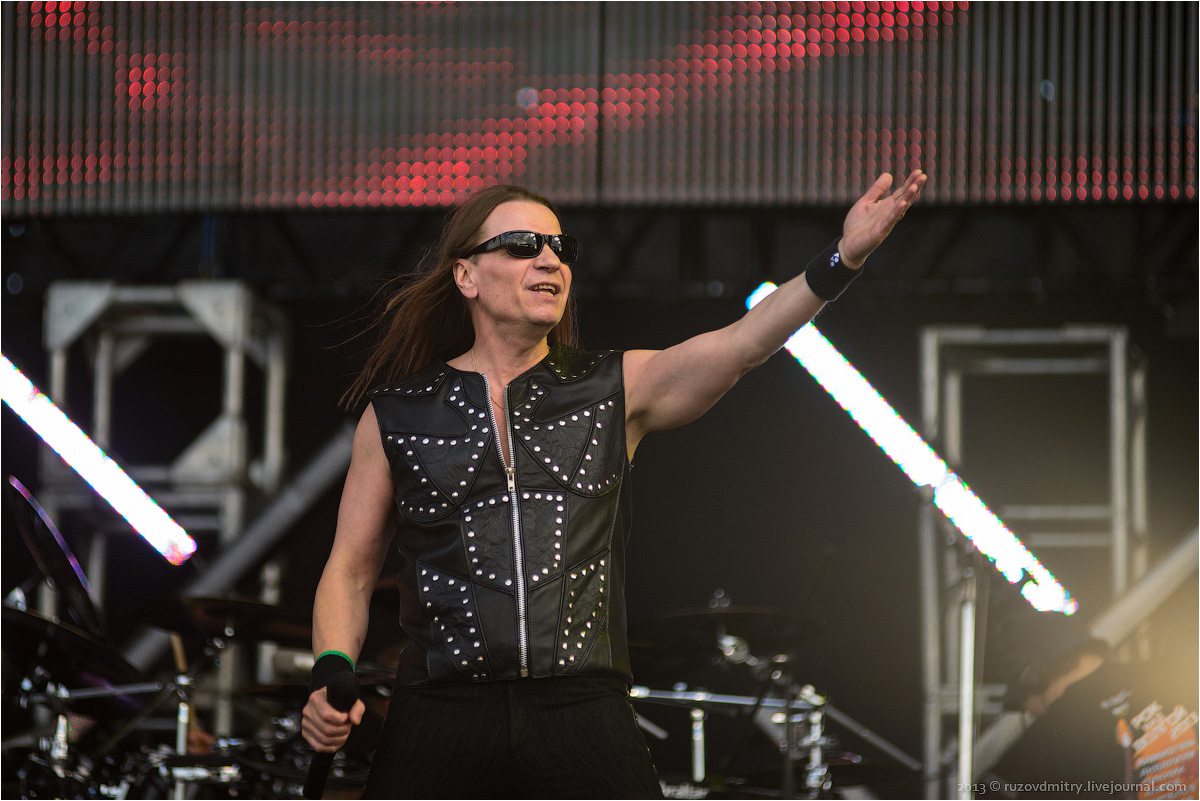
Valery Kipelov was the lead singer of Aria until 2002

In August 1987, Aria started working on their new album, Hero of Asphalt (originally named Serving the Forces of Evil), which is considered one of the band's best albums. Hero of Asphalt was Aria's first album published by the state music publishing monopoly Melodiya.

During that time, the band's relationship with their manager had reached a critical point. In October 1988, Udalov left the band because of the conflict, and in November Aleksandr Maniakin was invited to replace him. In 1989, the band then released their next album, Playing With Fire, with Yuriy Fishkin as their manager.

In 1990, Dubinin and Mavrin signed up with the band Lion Heart, and left for Munich, only to return in August after finding an opportunity to cancel their contract. After celebrating their five-year anniversary with several live shows, the band began to work on their fifth album Blood for Blood, which was released in 1991.

=== 1990s ===
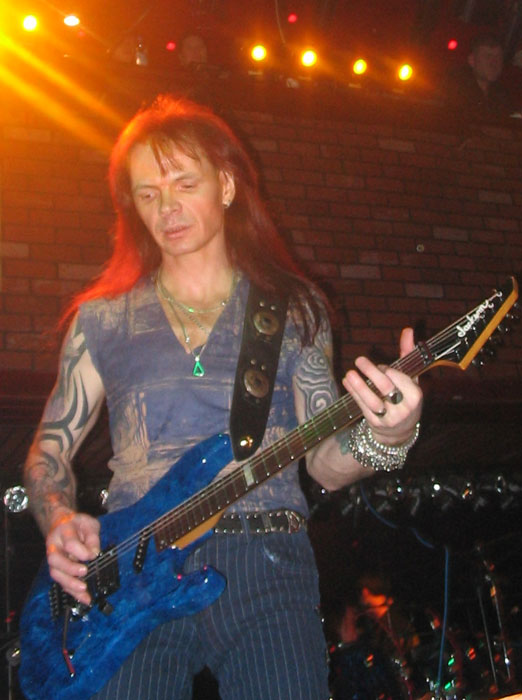
Sergey Mavrin was Aria's lead solo guitarist in 1987–1995

In the early 1990s, the band decreased their activity significantly, greatly reducing the number of live shows they performed.

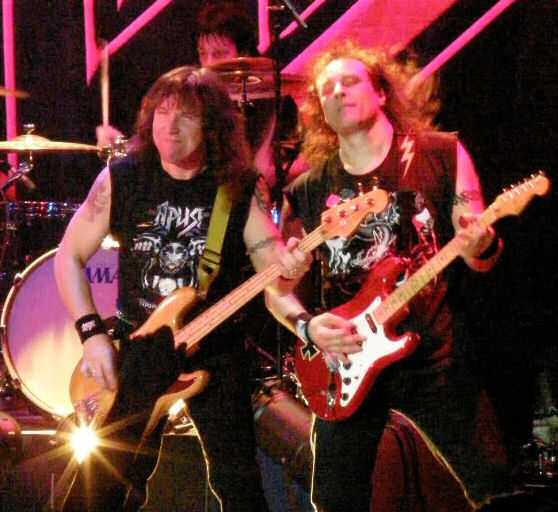
Dubinin (left) and Holstinin are the band's main songwriters. Max Udalov is seen in background.

By the end of the 1994 tour in Germany, the band had a disagreement with the organizers, which also reflected on the relationship within the band. After the tour ended, Kipelov stopped showing up at the studio, where the band was hard at work at their next album. Within a month's time, he was found out to be playing with Master. In January 1995, Sergey Mavrin left the band, stating that he did not believe that the band would succeed without his friend Kipelov. Sergey Terentyev was invited to replace him as a session musician, and later becomes a permanent member of the band.

Kipelov returned to the band soon after they were threatened with sanctions by MOROZ Records for breaching their contract.

=== Judgement Day ===
In 2001, Aria headlined the NASHEstvie festival, where they played with a symphonic orchestra.

=== With Arthur Berkut ===
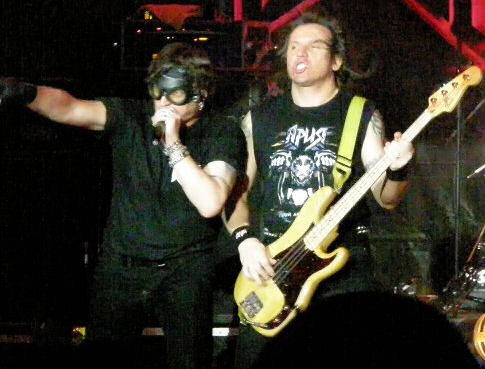
Arthur Berkut, Aria's vocalist in the 2000s

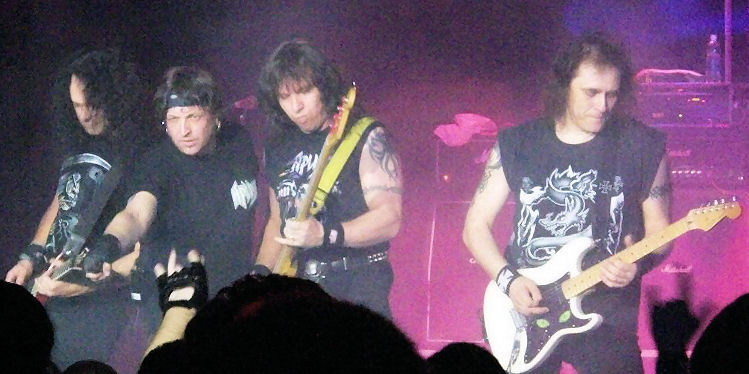
2008 line-up

In November 2002, a new line-up of Aria was announced. Sergey Popov from Master became the second guitarist, Arthur Berkut (ex-Autograph) was invited to be the new vocalist, and drummer Max Udalov returned to the band. On 5 December, Aria released the single 'Coliseum' followed by the album Baptism by Fire. A video for 'Coliseum' was shot. The release was successful, the songs "Coliseum" and "Baptism by Fire" reached No. 1 on the rock charts, though many fans criticized it, arguing that Berkut's voice did not fit Aria's music.

The newest album Armageddon, released by CD Maximum, came out in 2006, where Aria invited two new lyricists and Berkut made his début as composer.

In November 2010, Berkut and Kipelov sang on stage together with Aria for the 25th anniversary of the band. The concert was called the AriaFest and there were events in Saint Petersburg, Moscow and Ekaterinburg.

In 2011, Aria announced that Berkut was fired. No specific reason was given, but there were rumors that the band was unhappy with Arthur's live performances. He was replaced by Mikhail Zhitnyakov.

=== With Mikhail Zhitnyakov ===
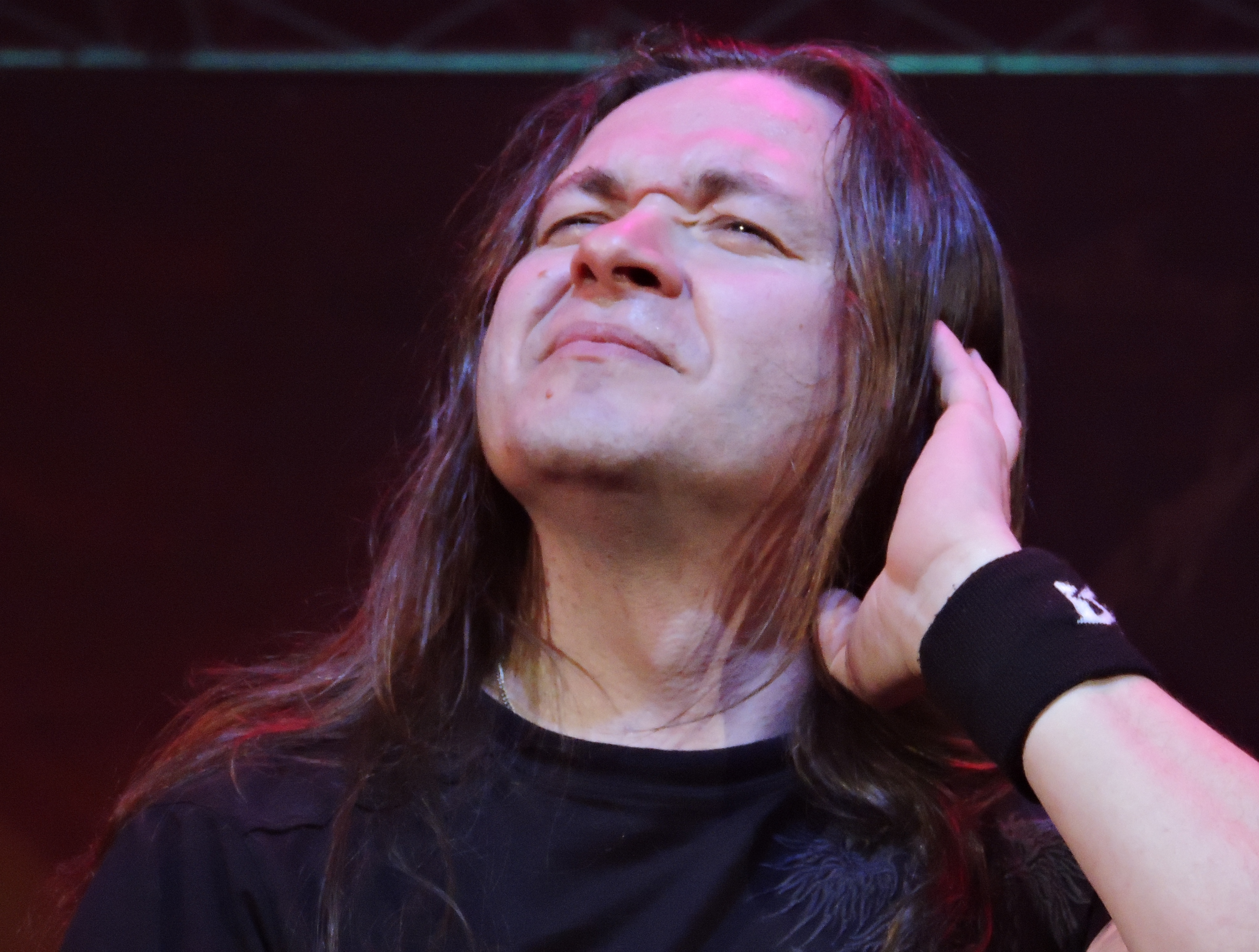
Mihail Zhitnyakov became Aria's third vocalist

In 2011, Aria released Phoenix, followed the next year by Live in the Studio. On 25 November 2014, Aria released their next album, Through All Times. On 13 November 2018, Ariya released the album Proklyat'ye morey (The Curse of the Seas).

== Band members ==
1985–1986

- Valery Kipelov – lead vocals
- Vladimir Holstinin – guitar
- Alik Granovsky – bass
- Alexander Lvov – drums
- Kirill Pokrovsky – keyboards

1986–1987

- Valery Kipelov – lead vocals
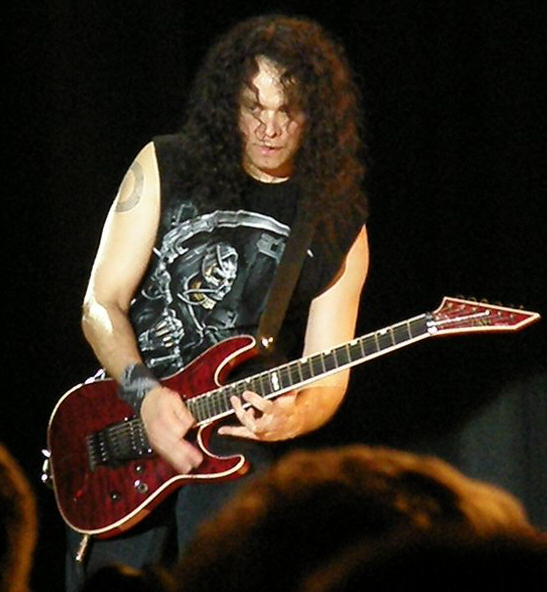
  Aria's guitarist Sergey Popov at a show in Vladivostok
- Vladimir Holstinin – guitar
- Andrey Bolshakov – guitar
- Alik Granovsky – bass
- Igor Molchanov – drums
- Kirill Pokrovsky – keyboards

1987–1989

- Valery Kipelov – lead vocals
- Vladimir Holstinin – guitar
- Sergey Mavrin – guitar
- Vitaly Dubinin – bass, backing vocals
- Maxim Udalov – drums

1989–1994

- Valery Kipelov – lead vocals
- Vladimir Holstinin – guitar
- Sergey Mavrin – guitar
- Vitaly Dubinin – bass, backing vocals
- Aleksandr Maniakin – drums

1995–2002

- Valery Kipelov – lead vocals
- Vladimir Holstinin – guitar
- Sergey Terentyev – guitar
- Vitaly Dubinin – bass, backing vocals
- Aleksandr Maniakin – drums

2002–2011

- Arthur Berkut – lead vocals
- Vladimir Holstinin – guitar
- Sergey Popov – guitar
- Vitaly Dubinin – bass, backing vocals
- Maxim Udalov – drums

Current

- Mikhail Zhitnyakov – lead vocals
- Vladimir Holstinin – guitar
- Sergey Popov – guitar
- Vitaly Dubinin – bass, backing vocals
- Maxim Udalov – drums

== Discography ==
- 1985: Мания Величия (Megalomania)
- 1986: С Кем Ты? (Who Are You With?)
- 1987: Герой Асфальта (Hero of Asphalt)
- 1989: Игра с огнём (Play with Fire)
- 1991: Кровь за кровь (Blood For Blood)
- 1995: Ночь короче дня (Night is Shorter Than Day)
- 1998: Генератор Зла (Generator of Evil)
- 2001: Химера (Chimera)
- 2003: Крещение огнём (Baptism by Fire)
- 2006: Армагеддон (Armageddon)
- 2011: Feniks (Aria album) (Phoenix)
- 2014: Через все времена (Through All Times)
- 2018: Проклятье морей (Curse of the Seas)
- 2025: Когда настанет завтра (When Tomorrow Comes)

== Music videos ==
- Pozadi Amerika (Позади Америка/America behind)
- Volya i razum (Воля и Разум/Will and reason)
- Ulitsa roz (Улица Роз/Street of roses)
- Vse, chto bylo (Всё,Что Было/All that was)
- Otshel'nik (Отшельник/Hermit)
- Gryaz' (Грязь/Dirt)
- Voz'mi moe serdtse (Возьми Моё Сердце/Take my heart)
- Dai zharu (Дай жару/Get it Hot / Give 'em Hell)
- Poteryannyi Rai (Потерянный Рай/The lost paradise)
- Bespechnyi Angel (Беспечный Ангел/cover version of Golden Earring – Going to the Run)
- Oskolok L'da (Осколок Льда/Splinter of ice)
- Shtil (with Udo Dirkschneider) (Штиль/Calm)
- Kolizei (Колизей/Coliseum)
- Kreshenie ognyom (Крещение Огнём/Baptism by fire)
- Tam visoko (Там Высоко/High up there)
- Poslednyi zakat (Последний Закат/The last sunset)
- Vremya Zatmeniy (lyrics video) (Время Затмений/Time of eclipses)
- Tochka Nevozvrata (Точка Невозврата/Point of noreturn)
- Ubit' Drakona (Убить Дракона/To Kill the Dragon)
