= Arthur Berkut =

Russian singer (born 1962)

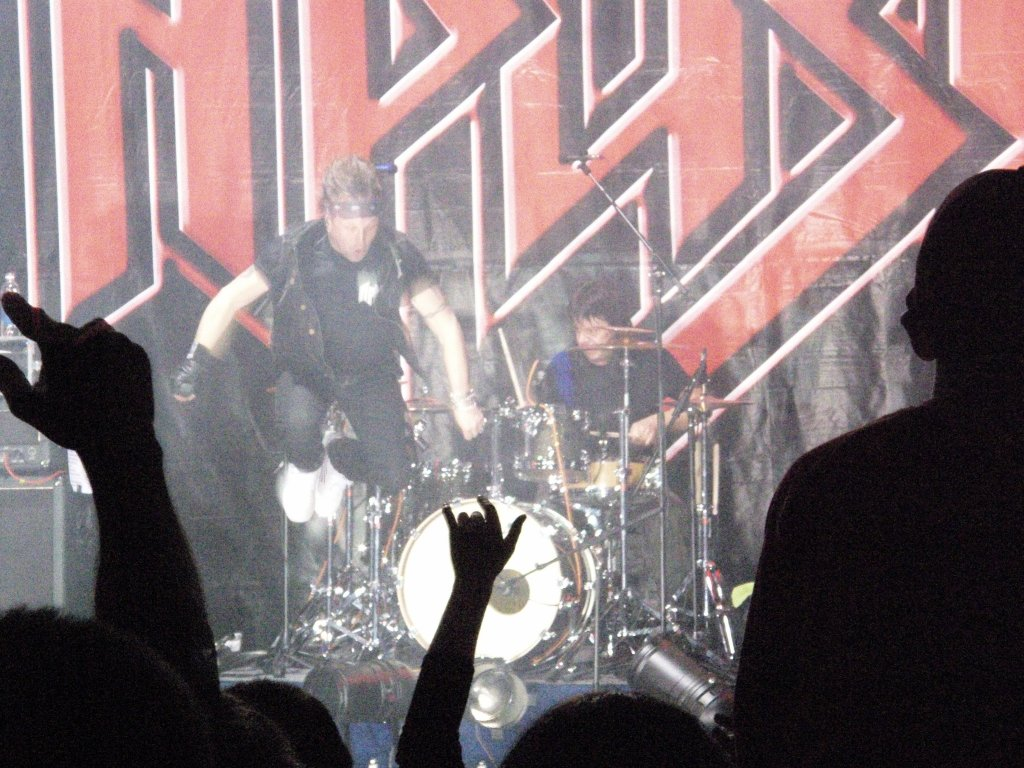
Berkut performing at Aria show in Vladivostok, April 8, 2008

Artur Vyacheslavovich Mikheev (Russian: Артур Вячеславович Михеев, born 24 May 1962), better known under his stage name Arthur Berkut (Russian: Артур Беркут), is a Russian singer. Throughout his career, he has participated in numerous bands, with the most notable being Autograph, Mavrik, and Aria.

Berkut was born in Kharkiv, Ukrainian Soviet Socialist Republic, to a family of Moscow circus troupers during their Ukrainian tour. Since 1984, Berkut has performed under his stage name, "Berkut", which is Russian for golden eagle. Together with Autograph, Berkut toured over the United States in 1989, but in 1990, during the tour, Autograph disbanded.

Berkut remained in the US and tried himself in different projects, formed a short-lived art rock band ZOOOM. In 1997, Berkut returned to Russia. He was a sessional vocalist in Master European tour, and together with some of Master musicians tried to resurrect ZOOOM. But a year after he dissolved the band and left to sing in Sergey Mavrin's solo project Mavrik. Berkut joined Aria in November 2002, replacing the band's former vocalist, Valery Kipelov. In 2011, he left Aria and formed a new band, Arthur Berkut, with whom he has recorded two albums so far.
