= Vladimir Holstinin =

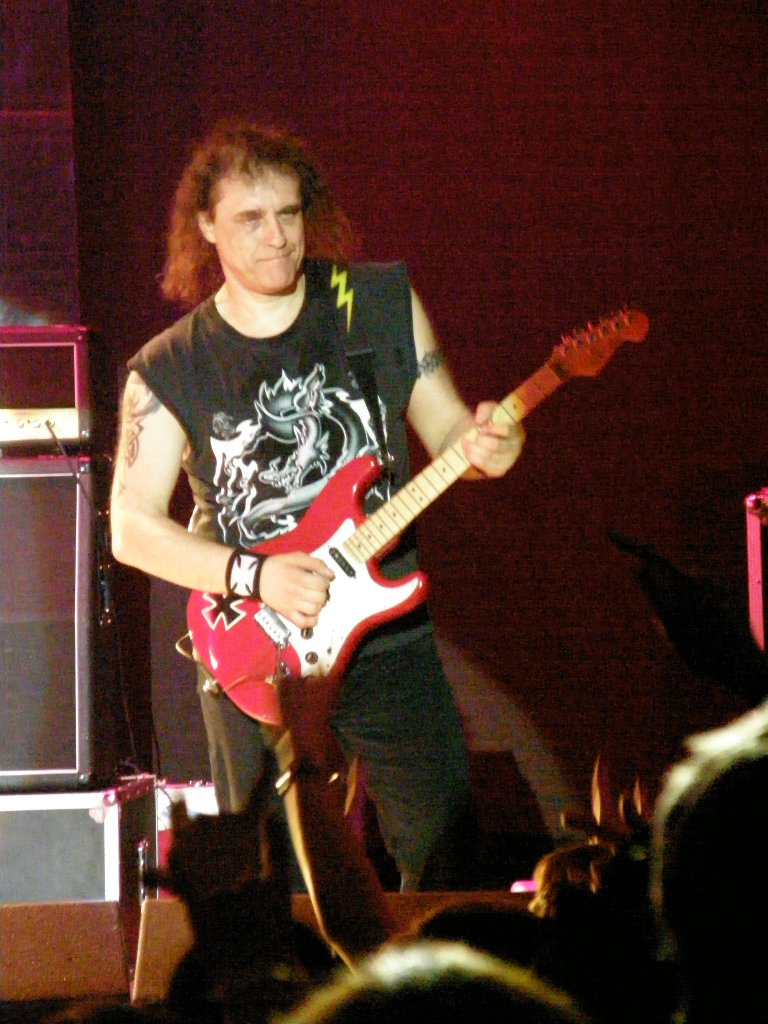
- Vladimir Holstinin performing for Aria

Background information
- Born: Vladimir Petrovich Holstinin; 12 May 1958 (age 68); Lyubertsy, Russian SFSR
- Occupations: Composer, guitarist

Vladimir Petrovich Holstinin (Russian: Влади́мир Петро́вич Холстинин) is a Russian guitarist. He is one of the founding members of heavy metal band Aria.

== Biography ==
Vladimir was born on 12 May 1958 in Lyubertsy, Russian SFSR. He graduated from Moscow Power Engineering Institute, where he met Vitaly Dubinin. The two institute mates became friends and formed a band Volshebnie Sumerki (Magic Twilight). The band played mostly cover versions of foreign bands' songs, such as Deep Purple and Rainbow. Arthur Berkut was the band's vocalist, and Magic Twilight is often considered to be a prototype to Aria.

After Twilight's disband, Holstinin, together with bassist Alik Granovsky, joined rock band Alpha. Their participation was short-lived, and in 1984 they went to VIA Poyushchie Serdtsa (Singing Hearts) led by producer Victor Vekshtein. Joined by vocalist Valery Kipelov, they formed a heavy metal band Aria, officially registered as a "side project" to Singing Hearts. Aria soon developed to be much more popular than original Singing Hearts that played a common kind of Soviet pop-rock music. After the breakup of original lineup, Holstinin and Kipelov kept the side of Vekshtein, who owned the band's name. Vladimir invited his friend and former bandmate Vitaly Dubinin to replace Granovsky on bass.

Currently, Holstinin remains the only founding member in actual lineup of Aria. Along with Dubinin, he is one of main composers of the band. Recently he produced some young metal bands; his most notable collaboration was the best-selling Elven Manuscript concept album by Epidemia.

== Equipment ==
- Several Fender Stratocaster and a couple Telecasters
- Several Jackson, including some RRV.
- Some Gibson Les Paul
- Several Dean, including DIME Signature models.
- Several Hamer guitars.
- Hembry, Martin, Taylor, Jay Turser.
- MARSHALL JVM 410
- MARSHALL TSL 100
- DIEZEL Herbert
- MARSHALL 1960A cabinet 4х12
- MARSHALL 1936 cabinet 2х12
- BOSS MIDI Controller
- MXR Phase 90
- MXR CAE Wah
- OVERDRIVE Энвера Чомаева (Envera Chomaeva)
- TORTUGA Martini Chorus
- ISP Decimator Noise Reduction pedal
- SEYMOUR DUNCAN Deja Vu Tap Delay
- JIM DUNLOP Talkbox
- KORG Pitch Black Tuner
- T-REX FuelTank Classic
- SHURE SM-57 Microphone
- DEAN MARKLEY Strings
- EVIDENCE AUDIO Cable

== Literature ==
- Маргарита Пушкина, Дилан Трой, Виктор Троегубов. «Легенда о Динозавре» (1999)
