= Valery Kipelov =

Russian singer (born 1958)

Valery Kipelov Валерий Кипелов
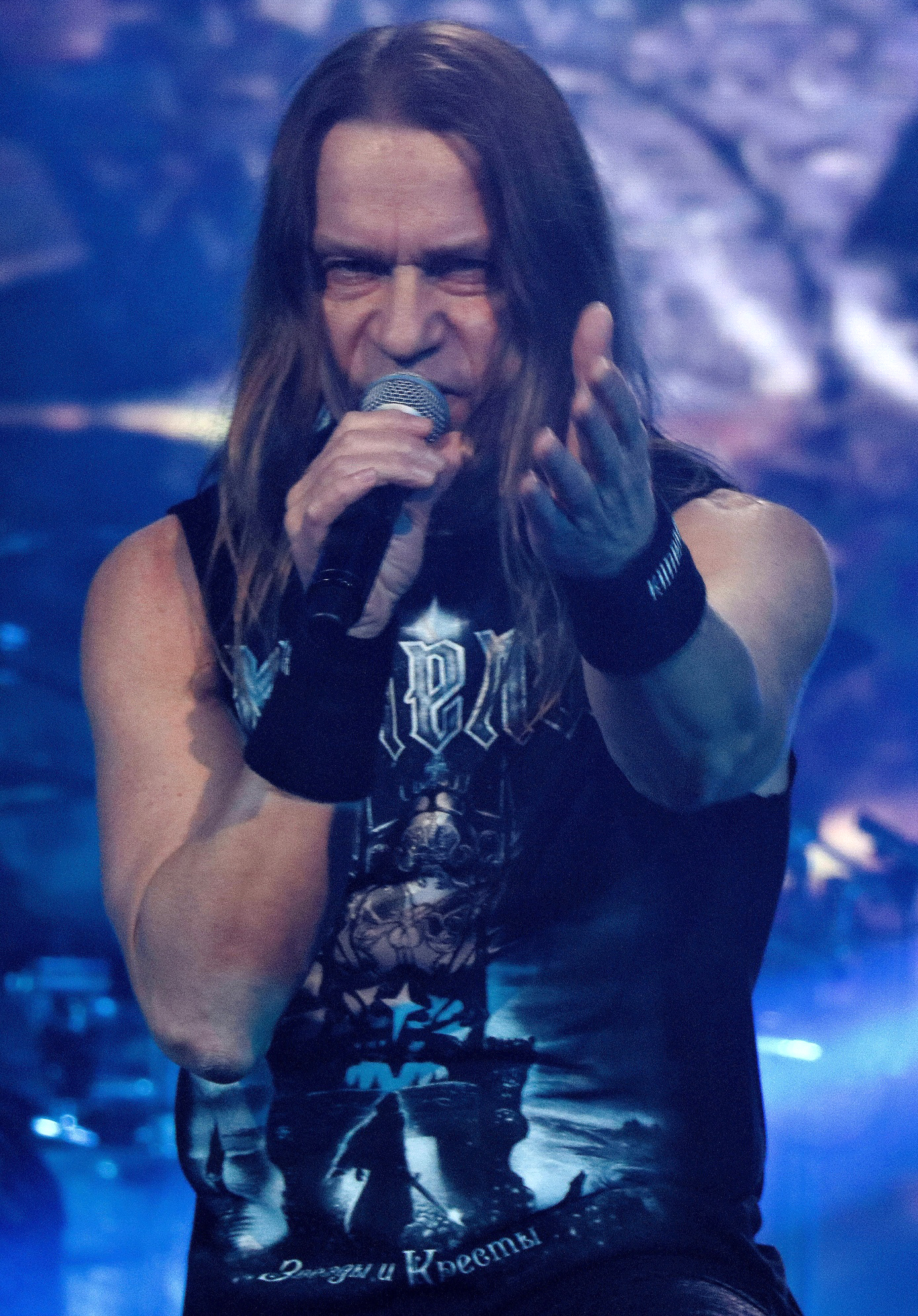
- Kipelov in 2018

Background information
- Born: Valery Alexandrovich Kipelov; 12 July 1958 (age 68); Moscow, Russian SFSR, Soviet Union
- Genres: Heavy metal, hard rock
- Occupations: Singer, songwriter
- Years active: 1980–present
- Formerly of: Aria, Kipelov

Valery Alexandrovich Kipelov (Russian: Валерий Александрович Кипелов; born 12 July 1958) is a Russian singer who was the vocalist and a founding member of heavy metal band Aria. Since 2002, Kipelov leads his own metal band, Kipelov.

== Early life ==
Kipelov was born in 1958 in Kapotnya, Moscow, Soviet Union.

== Career ==
=== Aria ===
Kipelov was among the founding members of Aria, alongside Vladimir Holstinin and Alik Granovsky, although he initially played a less active role in songwriting and the development of the band's style than the other two. For the first four albums, he only composed three songs (two of them slow ballads).. After the breakup in 1987, Kipelov and Holstinin were the only two members who remained with their producer Vekshtein.

During the Germany tour 1994, Kipelov's relations with Holstinin and Dubinin became tense. He ceased appearing at Aria's studio and was fired from the band. Then Mavrin refused to play without Kipelov and left the band, too. After participating in a few of Master's concerts, Kipelov tried to form a band of his own, but later returned to Aria following the threat from Moroz Records to sue the band for breach of contract.

In 2002, after the release of 'Himera', Kipelov refused to start recording the new album, already written by Dubinin and Holstinin. He stated his wish to start a solo career. This disagreement broke Aria apart after 'Judgement Day', on 31 August 2002.

=== Kipelov (band) ===
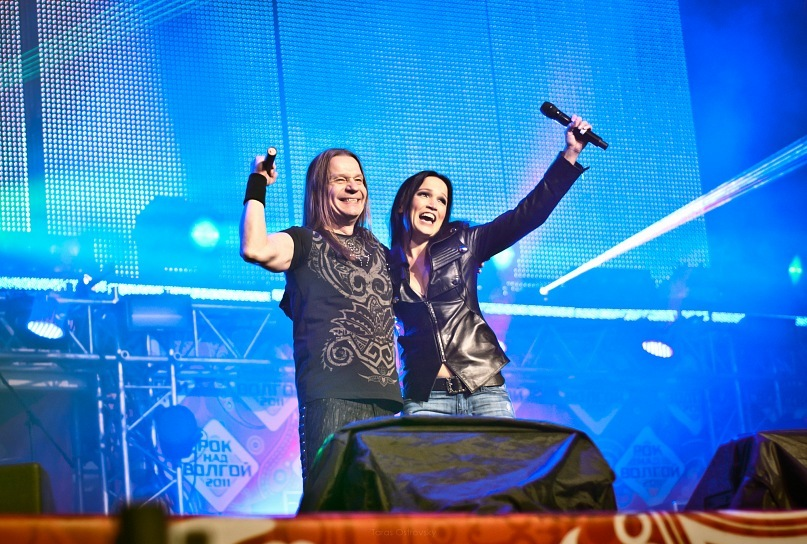
Kipelov performing with Tarja Turunen (ex-Nightwish) in 2011

On 1 September 2002, the day after Kipelov left Aria, Kipelov, Terentyev, Mavrin and Maniakin launched a new band named Kipelov (named at Terentyev's suggestion as the bandmembers couldn't come up with any better name). In 2003, they released the live album Put Naverh (Way to the Top), recorded in Saint Petersburg.

== Personal life ==
Kipelov is married to Galina Kipelova. He is Orthodox Christian.

=== Views on Ukraine ===
Kipelov expressed support of Russia's annexation of Crimea, and said it should have been returned to Russia in 1991. He performed at music festivals celebrating the event in Crimea. In July 2022, Kipelov performed in the hospital in front of Rosgvardiya servicemen wounded during the war in Ukraine.

In January 2023, Ukraine imposed sanctions on Valery for his support of the Russian invasion of Ukraine.
