= Melt-Banana discography =

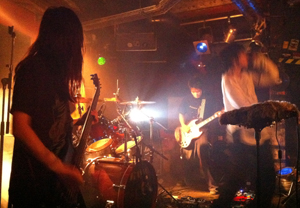
- Melt-Banana live in Hamburg, 2010
- Studio albums: 8
- Extended plays: 27
- Live albums: 2
- Compilation albums: 2

The discography of Melt-Banana, a Japanese noise rock band, consists of eight studio albums, two live albums and numerous EPs and singles.

== Albums ==
=== Studio albums ===
| Title | Album details |
|---|---|
| Speak Squeak Creak | Released: 9 September 1994; Label: NUX Organization (NUX-D9), A-Zap (AZ-0004); Formats: CD, LP, digital download |
| Cactuses Come in Flocks | Released: September 1994; Label: Chocolate Monk (CHOC 30), A-Zap (AZ-0002); Formats: Cassette, CD, LP, digital download |
| Scratch or Stitch | Released: 21 October 1995; Label: Meldac (MECI-25041), Skin Graft (GR 34); Formats: CD, LP |
| Charlie | Released: 27 October 1998; Label: A-Zap (AZ-0001); Formats: CD, LP, digital download |
| Teeny Shiny | Released: 12 December 2000; Label: A-Zap (AZ-0003); Formats: CD, LP, digital download |
| Cell-Scape | Released: 1 July 2003; Label: A-Zap (AZ-0005); Formats: CD, LP, digital download |
| Bambi's Dilemma | Released: 30 April 2007; Label: A-Zap (AZ-0007); Formats: CD, LP, digital download |
| Fetch | Released: 30 September 2013; Label: A-Zap (AZ-0009); Formats: CD, LP, digital download |
| 3+5 | Released: 24 August 2024; Label: A-Zap (AZ-0011); Formats: CD, LP, digital download |

=== Live albums ===
| Title | Album details |
|---|---|
| MxBx 1998/13,000 Miles at Light Velocity | Released: 16 February 1999; Label: Tzadik (TZ 7219); Formats: CD |
| Melt-Banana Lite Live Ver 0.0 | Released: 3 November 2009; Label: A-Zap (AZ-0008); Formats: CD, digital download |

=== Compilation albums ===
| Title | Album details |
|---|---|
| 13 Hedgehogs (MxBx Singles 1994–1999) | Released: 17 May 2005; Label: A-Zap (AZ-0006); Formats: CD, LP, digital download |
| Return of 13 Hedgehogs (MxBx Singles 2000–2009) | Released: 12 May 2015; Label: A-Zap (AZ-0010); Formats: CD, LP, digital download |

== Singles and EPs ==
| Year | Title | Other information | Label |
|---|---|---|---|
| 1994 | Hedgehog | Released in September, 1994. | Charnel Music CHS-5 |
| 1994 | 7" split w/God Is My Co-Pilot | Released on 22 October 1994; limited to 1,000 copies. | HG Fact HG-024 |
| 1995 | It's In the Pillcase | Released in July, 1995; re-issued by Skin Graft. | NUX Organization, Skin Graft NUX-EP 01, GR 24 |
| 1995 | 7" split w/Pencilneck | Released in October, 1995. | Anti-Music |
| 1995 | 7" split w/Discordance Axis | Released in 1995. | HG Fact |
| 1996 | 7" split w/Target Shoppers | Released in September, 1996. | Destroy All Music/Betley Welcomes Careful Drivers MZG 3253 |
| 1996 | 10" split w/Stilluppsteypa | Released in October, 1996. | Fire Inc./Something Weird |
| 1996 | Untitled (Piano One) | 7"; released in November, 1996. | Gentle Giant GG703 |
| 1997 | 7" split w/Plainfield | Released in September, 1997. | Smelly |
| 1997 | Eleventh | Released in October, 1997. | Slap-a-Ham Records 39 |
| 1998 | 5" split w/Xerobot | Released in March, 1998. | Coat-Tail |
| 1998 | Most Wanted World Wide (7" split w/Killout Trash) | Released in April, 1998. | kool.POP POP 7.001 |
| 1998 | Dead Spex | Released in October, 1998. | HG Fact HG-097 |
| 2001 | 8" split w/Three Studies For a Crucifixion | Released in August, 2001. | Passacaglia |
| 2001 | 7" split w/Dynamite Anna & the Bone Machine | Released in November, 2001. | Valium |
| 2001 | 7" split w/Damien Frost | Released on 4 November 2001; limited to 500 copies. | Alpha Relish AR7-002 |
| 2002 | 7" split w/The Locust | Released in January, 2002. | GSL GSL 48 |
| 2002 | 7" split w/Big D & the Kids Table | Released in October, 2002. | Fork In Hand |
| 2002 | 666 | Released in October, 2002. | Level PlaneLP-37 |
| 2004 | 7" split w/Narcosis | Released in November, 2004. | SuperFi/Speedowax SF005/ATOM025 |
| 2005 | 10" split w/Chung | Released in July, 2005. | Sounds of Subterrania SOS 059 |
| 2005 | 5" record/3" CD split w/Fantômas | Released in August, 2005. | Unhip UNHIP5 |
| 2006 | Ai No Uta | Released in February, 2006. | HG Fact HG-197 |
| 2007 | 3" CD split w/Fat Day | Released in July, 2007. | Dark Beloved Cloud DBC252 |
| 2009 | 7" split w/Young Widows | Released in August, 2009. | Temporary Residence TRR152 |
| 2009 | initial t. 7" record/3" CD | Released in October, 2009. | Init records INIT-57 |
| 2016 | 7" split w/Napalm Death | Released in November 25, 2016. | Ipecac Recordings IPC179 |

== Cassettes ==
- July 1993 - Melt-Banana (released by Iguana Coax)
- September 1993 - How Come Banana?? (released by Iguana Coax)
- October 1993 - Raw Egg Till Morning (released by Iguana Coax)
- September 1994 - Cactuses Come in the Flocks (released by Chocolate Monk)

== Compilation appearances and remixes ==
| Year | Title | Other information | Label |
|---|---|---|---|
| 1994 | Mi Caballito Chulo...! Como Lo Quie Ro... | V/A ("Pignight") | Los Apson LOS 0001 |
| 1994 | Cataclastic Fracture (A Noise Collection) | V/A ("Diego") | Deadline Recordings/Lazy Squid DLN 74/LS09 |
| 1995 | Lo-Fi Recording Series ~Electric Acoustic & Radical~ | V/A ("Sham Bazar", "Some Kind Of ID", "Crackhead Up Or Down" & "Incus! Incus! Incus!" w/Violent Onsen Geisha | Meldac MECI-25019 |
| 1995 | Megabank Presents Tribute to New Wave | V/A ("Wordy Rappinghood") | Megabank MB-2.507CD |
| 1995 | Bonafide Gas | V/A ("Black Is the Color Of My True Love's Hair") | Tedium House Publications BF10 |
| 1995 | Killing Ha Muerto...Cuantas Veces? | V/A ("Scrubber [Tropical Birds Version]") | Climax CUM 001 |
| 1996 | 31 Bands Trash 31 Songs to Find the Way to Sesame Street | V/A ("Everybody Wash") | Bun Length/CR Japan BL-8/CR-003 |
| 1996 | Great Blue Thing | V/A ("Ooze", "No Way to Bite the Crooked Doubt") | O' Great Blue Thing |
| 1996 | Balls to the Wall Magenta | V/A ("Q", "Slug Named God" - w/Otomo Yoshihide) | Dohb Discs ESCB-3213 |
| 1996 | The Christmas Album | V/A ("White Christmas") | Sony Music Entertainment Japan |
| 1997 | Land Of the Rising Noise: Vol. 2 | V/A ("Dig & Tickle, She Is Hit") | Charnel Music CHCD-23 |
| 1998 | Musique Non-Stop: A Tribute to Kraftwerk | V/A ("Showroom Dummies") | Toshiba EMI TOCT-10455 |
| 1998 | Smiling Pets | V/A ("Surfin' U.S.A.-You're Welcome") | Sony Music Entertainment SRCS 316 |
| 1998 | Bllleeeeaaauuurrrrgghhh! - A Music War | V/A ("7.2 Seconds Flipping") | Slap a Ham 42 |
| 1998 | Liverache - Tales From the Livers Edge | V/A ("He Says Drink Or Die, I Say Drink & Puke") | Very Small Records VSR 80 |
| 1999 | Knormalities | V/A ("Pluck!") | Dephine Knormal Musik DKM03 |
| 1999 | Erase Yer Head #9 | V/A ("Crack Up On Planet Q") | Pandemonium PAN 036 |
| 1999 | La Foresta Della Morte (The Deadly Forest) | V/A ("Plastic Eyes") | ToYo Records TOYO1 |
| 2001 | The Rebirth Of Fool - Vol. 2 | V/A ("Flash Section") | Dual Plover 244-FKJ |
| 2002 | Dynamite With a Laserbeam: Queen As Heard Through the Meat Grinder Of Three One G | V/A ("We Will Rock You") | Three One G 31G 20 |
| 2002 | Evil Against Evil | Salvo Beta ("Alpha Boost [Melt-Banana Remix]") | Someoddpilot SOPR007 |
| 2003 | Japanoise | V/A ("Brick Again") | Little Mafia LM022 |
| 2005 | One Bomb Fits All | Zea (""Flying Objects Arrived [Melt-Banana Remix]"") | Transformed Dreams DREAM 26 |
| 2005 | Our Last Day | V/A ("Ulterior") | Hydra Head HH666-81 |
| 2006 | Release the Bats: The Birthday Party As Heard Through the Meat Grinder Of Three One G | V/A ("Faint Heart") | Three One G 31G 34 |
| 2007 | Doggy Style: The Dogs Tribute | V/A ("GST 483") | Future Now Records FNCD-1001 |
