= Hedgehog (disambiguation) =

A hedgehog is a small, spiny mammal.

Hedgehog may also refer to:

- Domesticated hedgehog
- Hedgehog (band), a Beijing rock band
- Hedgehog cactus (disambiguation), a common name for Pediocactus, Echinocereus, or Echinopsis
- Hedgehog plant, Erinacea anthyllis
- Hedgehog (chess), a pawn formation in chess
- Hedgehog (weapon), an anti-submarine weapon
- Czech hedgehog (military), an anti-tank, anti-vehicle obstacle
- Hedgehog signaling pathway, a signal transduction pathway
- The Hedgehog, a 2009 French film directed by Mona Achache
- Hedgehog (EP), an EP by Melt-Banana
- Hedgehog (film)
- Hedgehog (geometry), a curve formed as the envelope of lines determined by a support function
- Hedgehog (hypergraph), a hypergraph formed from a complete graph by adding another vertex to each edge.

== See also ==
- Hedgehog space, a topological space
- Hedgehog mushroom (disambiguation), multiple uses
- Hedgehog defence, a military stratagem
- Ron Jeremy, nickname "The Hedgehog", actor
- Hedgehog's dilemma, a philosophical analogy
- Hedgehog slice, a chocolate cake with biscuit pieces
- The Hedgehog and the Fox, an essay by the philosopher Isaiah Berlin
- Sonic the Hedgehog, a video game series
  - Sonic hedgehog protein, a protein playing a key role in vertebrate organogenesis
