= Max Samosvat =

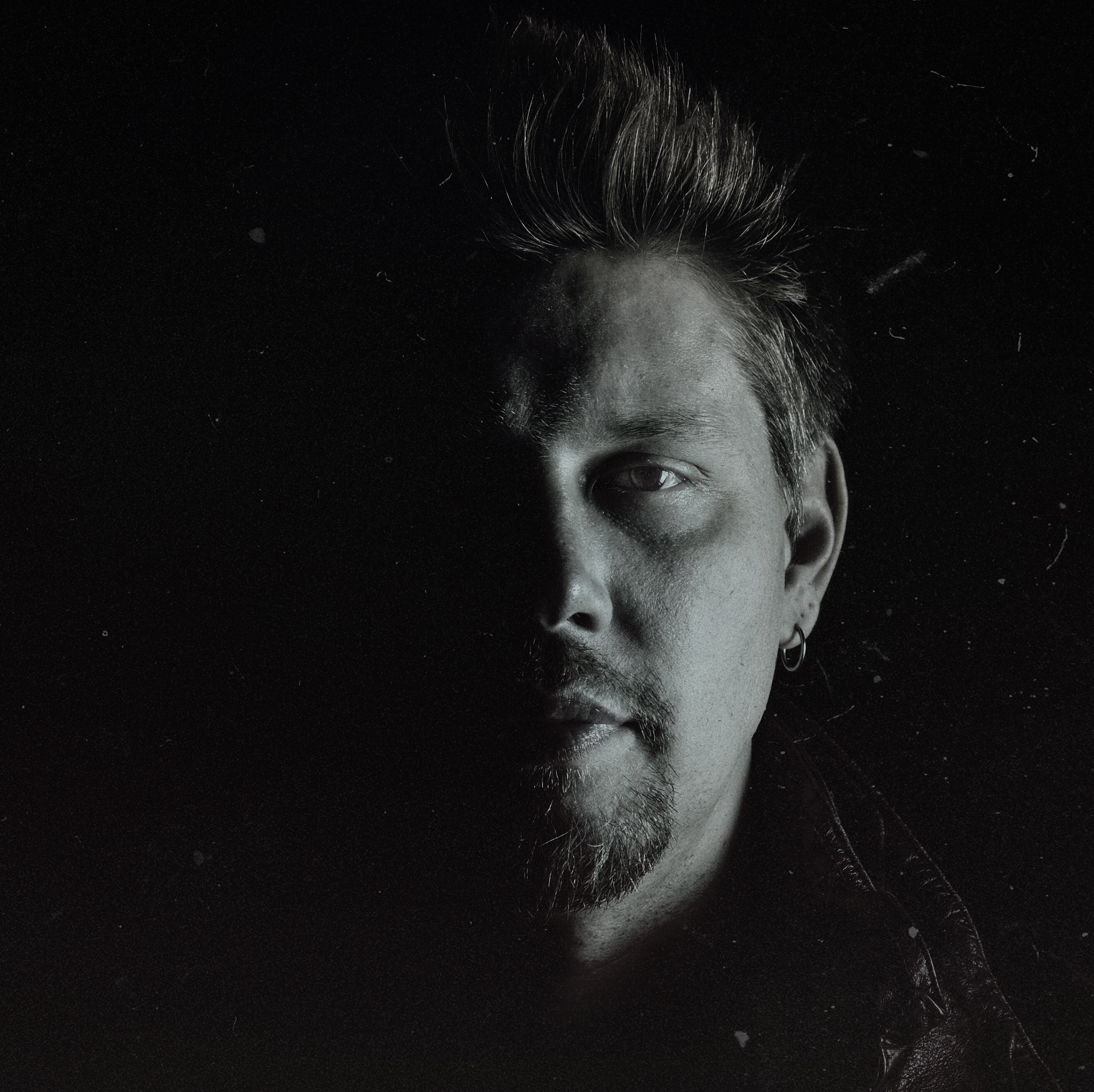

Background information
- Born: Maxim Vyacheslavovych Samosvat; 15 June 1981 (age 45); Moscow, Russia
- Genres: Progressive metal, Power metal
- Occupations: Vocals, sound director
- Years active: 2000–present
- Labels: Dreamport, Moroz Records, CD-Maximum

Maxim Vyacheslavovich Samosvat (Russian: Максим Вячеславович Самосват; born 15 June 1981, in Moscow), is a Russian rock musician and producer. He was the vocalist of Mechanical Poet (2003–2006) and Epidemia (2000–2010).

== Biography ==
His first band was Orcrist, which included future members of Epidemia, Ilya Knyazev and Roman Zakharov. Early in his career he also performed with groups such as Lady Prowler, Strangers, and Travel to the Night.

In 2000 he became the vocalist in Epidemia, the Russian power metal band. His first job was with the group album Magical Mystery Countries in 2001. In 2004 the group, in collaboration with other well-known Russian singers – Arthur Berkut (Aria), Lexx (Master), Andrey Lobashev (Arida Vortex), Cyril Nemolyaev (Boney NEM), Dmitry Borisenkov (Black Obelisk) – recorded Russia's first metal opera, Elven Manuscript, where Max played the role of Desmond, a half-elf.

In 2005, Epidemia has released its fifth album, numbered, Living in Twilight. The record contains a rewrite of songs from the first album, with the track list determined by fans via the internet.

In 2006 Samosvat participated in the recording of Master – "On the other side of sleep" in the project Margenta on the verses Margarita Pushkina. Maxim song "Za granyu" Samosvat also participated in the recording of the band's albums Everlost – Noise Factory and Hatecraft – Lost Consolation.

In 2007 he published a sequel to Elven Manuscript entitled Elven Manuscript 2: Saga For All Times. This record also featured famous names: those already involved in the first part of the metal opera (Berkut, Lobashev, Borisenkov and Nemolyaev) were joined by Mikhayl Seryshev (ex-Master), Konstantin Rumyantsev (Troll Gnet El) Ekaterina Belobrova (The Teachers), Eugeny Egorov (Epidemia). Samosvat again sang the role of Desmond.

Maxim was also a singer for progressive rock group Mechanical Poet. He was involved in the recording of two albums: Handmade Essence(2003), Woodland Prattlers (2004). In 2005, Maxim was invited to attend the reunion of Mechanical Poet, but preferred Epidemia. His place in Mechanical Poet was taken by Jerry Lenin.

On 25 October 2010 Maxim announced his retirement from Epidemia. His last performances with the group included 12/10/2010 in St. Petersburg, and Moscow 12/11/2010. He was later replaced by Evgeny Egorov.

== Discography ==
=== Epidemia ===
- Загадка волшебной страны – The Quest of the Magic Land (2001)
- Эльфийская рукопись – Elven Manuscript (2004)
- Жизнь в сумерках – Living in Twilight (2005)
- Эльфийская рукопись: Сказание на все времена – Elven Manuscript 2: Saga For All Times (2007)
- Сумеречный Ангел – Angel of Twilight (Single) (2009)
- Дорога домой – Road to Home (2010)

=== Mechanical Poet ===
- Handmade Essence (2003)
- Woodland Prattlers (2004)

=== Others ===
- Hatecraft – Lost Consolation (2005)
- Catharsis – Крылья (Krylya) (2005)
- Мастер – По ту сторону сна (The Other Side of a Dream) (2006)
- Фактор страха – Театр Военных Действий, Акт 1 (Theater of War. Act 1)) (2005)
- Everlost – Noise Factory (2006)
- Алексей Страйк – Время полной луны (The time of full moon) (2005)
- Бони НЕМ – Тяжелые Песни О Главном. Часть 2 – Hard Songs about Main. Chapter 2 (2008) – guest vocals
- Ольви – Сказочный сон – Dreaming Sleep (2009)
