= Spike (Agata album) =

Studio album by Ichiro Agata
- Released: May 25, 2004
- Recorded: October 2003 – January 2004
- Genres: Noise, experimental rock, avant-garde
- Length: 40:10
- Label: Tzadik
- Producer: Ichiro Agata

Professional ratings
Review scores
Source	Rating
Allmusic	3.5/5 stars

Spike is the first solo album by Japanese guitarist Agata of the band Melt-Banana. It was released on Tzadik in May 2004.

The album consists mainly of solo guitar and sound effects. Agata is known for creating strange soundscapes with his guitar and often sounds nothing like a guitar. This album could be seen as an extra addition to Melt-Banana's discography as it shares many similarities to his guitarwork in Melt-Banana. The album also sounds similar to "Outro For Cell-Scape" on Melt-Banana's previous album Cell-Scape, with several songs (e.g. "Frontside Boardslide Shovit out" or "Nollie Crooked Grind") being named after popular skateboard tricks.

== Track listing ==
1. Stealth – 0:31
2. Ice Driver – 1:02
3. Splinter - 0:16
4. Animal Instinct – 0:25
5. Frontside Boardslide Shovit Out – 0:18
6. Pinger – 0:45
7. Armillary Sphere – 1:22
8. Ecco Feedback – 1:48
9. Bungy – 1:15
10. Rescued To Be Shot And Killed – 0:30
11. Tailgrab – 0:46
12. 38915 Bubbles – 1:01
13. Team Pocket Pickering – 1:18
14. Starfish – 2:39
15. Cable Has No Name – 1:59
16. Vertigo (Recti-Head) – 1:17
17. Switch Life – 1:01
18. Twilight Sinking – 4:24
19. Invaded – 0:22
20. Nollie Crooked Grind – 0:30
21. Piezo Sparker – 0:50
22. Bone Puzzle – 0:52
23. Nyazilla – 1:39
24. Inokashira Zoo – 3:04
25. Air Nozzles And Echoes Reset Live – 10:05

== Personnel ==
- Guitar / Sound Effects: Agata
- Recording Information: Studio Museum, Tokyo, Japan
