= Tarakany! =

Russian punk rock band

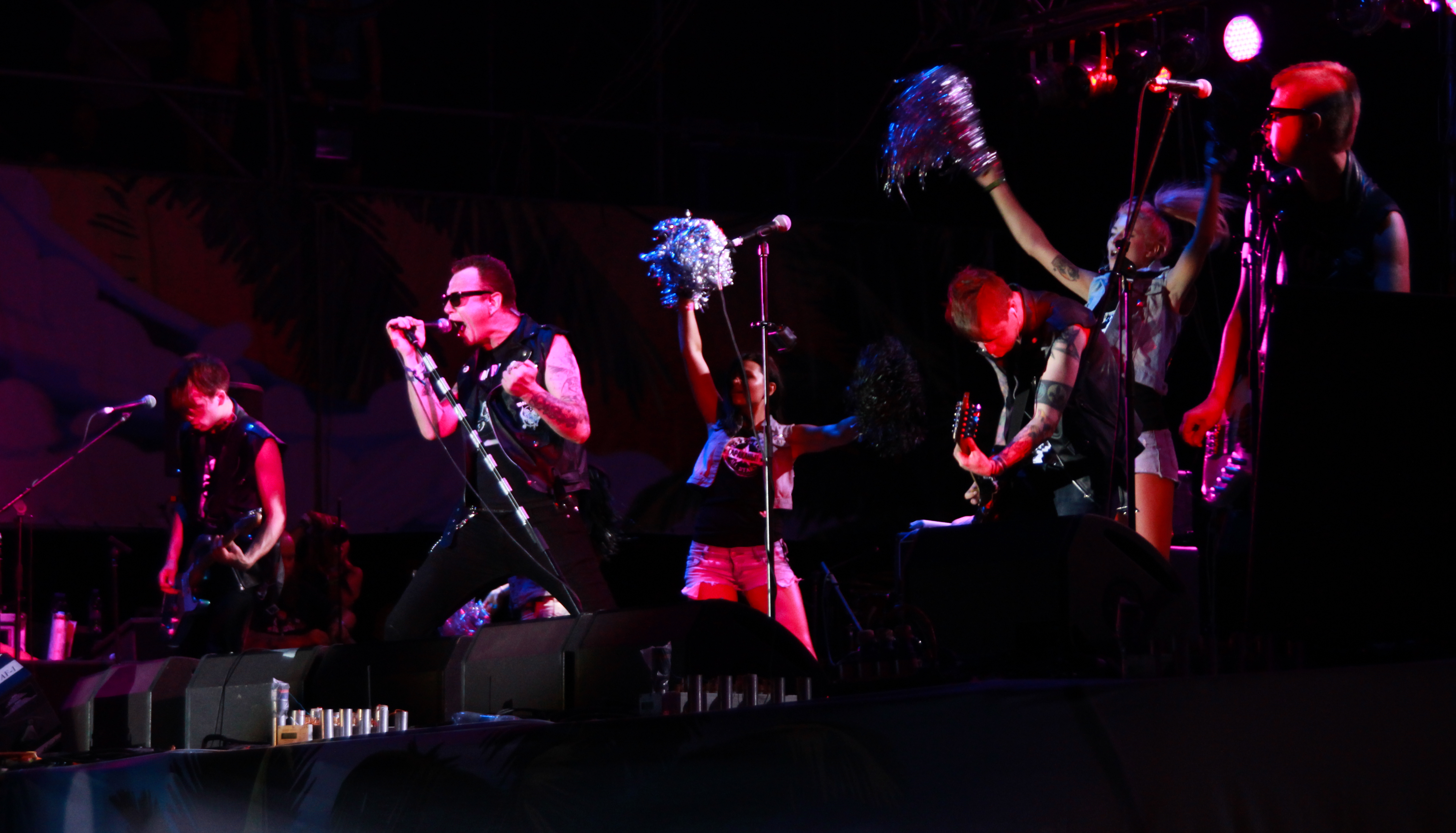
- Tarakany! in 2012

Background information
- Origin: Moscow, Russia
- Genre: Punk rock
- Years active: 1991–2022
- Labels: Feelee, AiB, Soyuz
- Members: Dmitry Spirin; Sergey Prokofyev; Dmitry Kezhvatov; Vasily Lopatin; Alexander Pronin

Tarakany! (previously Chetyre Tarakana "The 4 Cockroaches") was a Russian punk rock band based in Moscow. Formed in 1991, the band has released 14 studio albums, 5 live albums, and several splits and compilations. The band has repeatedly toured Russia and other CIS countries, as well as Europe, Japan, Israel, Georgia, and Kazakhstan.

Tarakany! is one of the few Russian rock bands to create original music in both Russian and English.

== History ==
=== Early Years (as Chetyre Tarakana, 1991–1997) ===
The band was formed in Moscow in 1991. The band's original line-up was:

- Yuri Lenin — vocals, guitars
- Dmitry Vorobyov — guitars
- Dmitry Spirin — bass
- Denis Rubanov — drums, percussion

All founders were 15–16 years old, and three of them were classmates. In 1991, the band released their first demo, Crazy Boys (which was only distributed through underground channels and has still never been officially released), hence becoming a part of the Moscow Rock Laboratory. Together with such punk acts as PoGo, Va-Bank, Naïve, Distemper and others, the band helped formed the Moscow underground scene during those years.

In 1992, they released their debut album, Duty Free Songs, featuring tracks in both English and Russian performed by their new vocalist, Denis Petukhov. At that time, the band's style and sound was influenced by the Sex Pistols, Ramones, and The Clash. Their lyrics were mainly about street punk romance, alcohol, drugs, sex, and hanging out.

The album was released by the band members independently, and distributed exclusively on cassettes.

...the sound is thich—at times even somewhat metallic ("Time Has Passed"), and sometimes mainstream ("Home Sweet Home"); the piano sounds are very pleasing. 5 of 11 tracks are in English... Some stuff sounds monotone ("Chetyre Tarakana"), while others are melodic ("Krysa"). FUZZ No. 6 (45), June 1997

In 1993, the band suspended their activities for 1.5 years due to Dmitry ‘Sid' Spirin's imprisonment for drug possession. Two years later, they recorded the new album, Best Before, entirely in English. Dmitry Spirin replaced Denis Petukhov as Tarakany!'s singer. The album's sound and songwriting were influenced by bands like Ramones, Buzzcocks, and Generation X. The lyrics were devoted to personal values, opposition to the majority, and being lonely and far away from home. The album's track, "Farewell Majority", was aired several times on special programmes at Radio Maximum, a popular Moscow rock radio station. The music video "Don't Come" found its way on some music TV programmes. Also, this was the first time when the band's records were reviewed by major American punk-zines. Moreover, the band gave a big interview to Maximum Rocknroll.

=== FeeLee Records ===
Between 1995 and 1997, Chetyre Tarakana were frequenters in Moscow and St. Petersburg clubs and attracted the attention of FeeLee record company. In 1997, the band released their first album on FeeLee records titled Ukral? Vypil?! V Tyurmu!!! where they somewhat changed their stylistics, mixing a classic Ramones-inspired sound with early Green Day/Lookout! Records.

... the album is specially for those die-hard skeptics who still think rock'n'roll and punk died long ago. Traditional drive, power, fun, tastes, and smells. All the tracks are brilliant. ОМ, February 1998

Immediately after releasing the album, the band changed their name to Tarakany! and it has remained unchanged to this day. Two songs from the album ("Durnaya Bashka" and "Nepogoda" received serious airplay on Radio Maximum, thereby increasing their army of fans, expanding their geography of performances, and pushing the band into several major rock and punk festivals where they shared the stage with bands such as Toy Dolls, Stranglers, the Exploited, and Rage Against the Machine. In late 1998, Tarakany! released the album, Posadki Net, featuring 16 songs in Russian, and a Depeche Mode cover of "Personal Jesus" which ultimately ended up finding its way to the first Russian tribute to Depeche Mode. Three of the songs the band decided to produce music videos for, "Personal Jesus", "Punk-Rock Pesnya" and "Poezd V Storonu Arbatskoy" ended up being selected for broadcast by then fledgling, MTV Russia. The network had only been in existence for a month when the album was released. "Punk-Rock Pesnya" and "Poezd V Storonu Arbatskoy" reached the top chart positions at Russian rock station Nashe Radio.

Their positive punk rock is truly no worse than Green Day, NOFX, and other California bands. Using old tube amps and a one-channel approach (essentially), Ramones-fed Tarakany! have gained a real punk sound adding measured doses of reggae and ska like Rancid does overseas. The front man Sid shows a huge voice gorgeously shaded with old school American pop-singers. ОМ, Andrey Bukharin

In 1999, Tarakany! released their first live album, Eto Zhizn: Ofitsialny Bootleg. In Winter 2000, the band embarked on their first European tour where they supported the Monsters for several shows. Followed by the next album few months later, Popcorm (My Nauchili Mir Sosat') became one of the first pop-punk albums in Russia. Their songs "365 Dney" and "Mnogo Telok I Piva" climbed to the TOP-10 of the Russian rock radio charts, and the video for "365 Dney" was in full rotation on MTV Russia.

…Album by album, the band is increasingly switching from the Moscow to the Californian punk school like Green Day or Rancid ... It is rather more exciting to listen to their style juggling and embellishing their happy-punk background with ska, reggae and country... I would not be surprised if Sid will practice Tuvan throat singing in five years or so. Anyway, his tremendous Sinatrian vocals are damn well-adjusted.

Afisha, March 2000

On March 18, 2000, the band took part in the punk/alternative/rap festival Beat Bitva in Moscow's Dynamo Stadium. During the festival, hundreds of Nazi skinheads attacked the festival and anyone in the way. Two of the band's members were injured as a result of the fight with the Nazis.

In early 2001, Tarakany! celebrated their 10th anniversary, and FeeLee Records reissued the band's entire back catalogue as well as released Tarakany!'s first ever "Best Of" compilation.

Towards the end of that same year, Tarakany! cooperated with the Japanese band SOBUT on the split-album, Realny Punk?/Punk This Town, and it was released in Russia.

In Spring 2002, they released their sixth studio album, Strakh I Nenavist' featuring the song "Ya Smotryu Na Nikh" which became one of the band's top hits and one of the top three offerings on the rock radio charts during the 16 week chart period. In 2013, the song reached the 55th position in the top 500 Russian rock hits, according to Nashe Radio. To present the album, the band arranged their first nationwide tour from the eastern to the western edge of Russia followed by Tokyo, Osaka and Nagoya, Japan with SOBUT, Assfort and Samurai Attack. Furthermore, the new album was released in Japan by Old Blood Records.

The new record showed the band's transformation towards rapid melodic Californian punk rock which lyrics and music discussing themes such as domination, brainwashing, social issues, personal identity, all the while maintain the band's awareness of its own traditional humor.

... Otherwise, a new album could easily be issued by Epitaph…. Tarakany! have made a really great positively commercial punk outfit... In short, all the stuff here will just hit you... Muzykalnaya Gazeta

Finally Russia shows the world its punk! I have been trying for years and years to discover the elusive Russian punk rock. Finally I have found it, and I couldn't be more satisfied. I found this CD in Japan, just months after the band was in the country touring with their label mates, my favorite Japanese punk band ever: SOBUT. … It is mid-paced melodic punk with deep, but melodic vocals The production is so clear it could have been done by Ryan Greene or Mark Trombino. I'd sing along with it if I could, but all I can do is crank it up and enjoy. My senses tell me that the lyrics are intelligent and street-wise, socially aware but not overly political, because the band does not sound particularly angry nor poppy and happy. The beats are fast, and there is lots of variety in rhythm. None of the songs sound the same; they are all loaded with individual flavor, often laced with traces of hardcore guitar riffs and street punk gang vocals. In America, they would definitely be Epitaph or Fat calibre. I hope this band will be accessible in the west before long. www.PunkInternational.com

Also, 2002 resulted in the special best of compilation, Luchshee, Vrag Khoroshego. It was composed of newly arranged old songs, as well as one previously unreleased track. In the beginning of 2003, Tarakany! celebrated their 12th anniversary with a show in DKG (Gorbunov Palace of Culture), a famous Moscow rock landmark, where they performed 45 songs for over 2500 people.

In early 2003, Tarakany! collaborated with the legendary Marky Ramone, the drummer for the Ramones. Their joint band was titled Marky Ramone & The Pinhead Army.

=== AiB Records ===
In late 2003, their first studio album release on their new label, AiB Records. Ulitsa Svobody at its album release concert at Moscow's Gorbunova Palace (DKG) drew more than 2500 fans. The concert itself was recorded for CD and can also be found on their 2004 DVD A My Uzhe Rubim!. This album is filled with up-tempo and meaningful tracks about freedom, choice, and equality. The songs were each directed against intolerance, nationalism, and indifference.

… Ulitsa Svobody is just what this album could and simply had to be like—sharp, powerful, snotty, furious, uncompromising, and straight-ahead. This is for those who are able not only to ascertain the shortcomings of the surrounding reality and of theirs, but also to endeavour to change something, to change themselves, which is worth a lot. For those who do not want to remain indifferent, to tolerate their own drawbacks, who are not afraid to be misunderstood… The new release is not only invigorating and providing "mind and heart" music with healthy anger inoculation. This is an ultimate monolith full of ear-pleasing rock tunes. Intense, fuzzy, and huge record. Rockmusic.ru

The band made two videos off of this album, "Granitsy Ghetto" ("The Ghetto Limits") and "Hymn Democraticheskoy Molodyohi Mira" ("The Hymn of Democratic Youth of the World"). The previous, both featured and was directed by well-known theater and film actor Vladimir Epifantsev. While the latter consisted of footage from the band's Japanese tour. Both videos appeared on A-1 Channel, the first federal alternative music TV channel in Russia.

The band's 2004 LP, Rakety Iz Rossii became the ideological successor of Ulitsa Svobody.

The band again entered Russia's charts in the top 3 with its single, "Tishina Eto Smert" ("Silence is Death"). Its video was broadcast on both MTV Russia and A-1. Later that year, ZCM Records released both albums in Europe under the names "Freedom Street" and "Rockets from Russia". Those European versions also contained several English and German language versions, as well as the original Russian songs.

In 2004, Tarakany! began working towards acquainting the public at large with the mostly unknown sound of true punk music, a style of music not widely found. The project, and its recorded audio equivalent, "High School of Punk", was at that time, the largest punk rock music festival in Russian history with a capacity crowd of 6,000 in attendance at Luzhniki Stadium. Tarakany!'s role in this festival was simultaneously as co-organizers, and co-headliners. The festival's Western headliner was Misfits.

In Winter 2005, Tarakany! participated in the European Ramones night tour with Marky Ramone (ex-Ramones). Concerts were held in Germany, Switzerland, Italy, Norway, Sweden, Denmark, Czech Republic, Austria, and Netherlands, and included performances from such bands as Manges, Peawees, and Moped Lads. 2005 was also the band's Finnish debut, playing the Ilosaarirock Festival with MC5, Skatalites, Agnostic Front, Backyard Babies, and others.

Near the end of 2005, Tarakany! released a split album with the members of Japan's SOBUT who had already left the band and re-united as Screams of Presidents.

In early 2006, another split-album came out. This time, their collaborators were the Russian ska veterans, Distemper. Immediately following the Russian release, An'na Nadel Records put it out in Europe. The split-album contains six original songs, replayed by the other, and one jointly composed song, a cover of Sham 69's "If The Kids are United". Tarakany!'s 2006 studio album release, Vlasteliny Vselennoy, saw the band deviate from its traditional sound in favor a something more punk'n'roll. Four of these new songs entered the Russian radio rock charts: "Kto-To Iz Nas Dvoikh", "10 Millionov", "Pozvol Mne Pobyt' Odnomu", and "Vlasteliny Vselennoy".

The guys are gonna end up with "adult oriented rock" outweighing their normal audacious punk. Their new album contains less flippancy and more lyricism. Rolling Stone Magazine

In 2007, Tarakany! celebrated their 15th anniversary by putting on two gigs at Moscow's Club Tochka (about 1,500 people each show) whose audio and video materials were recorded in the double CD+DVD combo, Krepkie Zuby I Ostrye Kogti. In that year, the band experimented with their own creative approach and started a new project, Unplugged Unlimited. In particular, they expanded their live line-up with back-vocalists, a wind section, and dramatically re-arranged their old songs by performing them in surprising styles such as bossa nova, latina, surf, and rhumba. The project was embodied in the eponymous album.

It was at approximately this time that the band had cameos in two different episodes of Russia's version of the television show, Married... with Children.

In mid-2008 Tarakany! was the opening act for the first, and only, Moscow performance of the Sex Pistols. Half a year later, the band released their EP, Skolko Deneg U Boga? (How Much Money's God Got?") whose title track caused public controversies and threats from religious radicals.

=== 2009–present ===
In November 2009, the band issued a new long-play, Boy Do Dyr. Some songs from the album were used by Cannes-award winning director Valeriya Gai Germanika towards the soundtrack for her notorious series, Shkola (School). Consequently, she directed the music video for the band's song "To, Chto Ne Ubivaet Tebya" ("Reign of Failure"). That track was an unparalleled success for the band.

... The band has created a surprisingly adult, honest and self-ironic record, charming in its pathos lacking simplicity. The lyrics are about social issues, a bit romance, and a lot of rock-and-roll, whose joys and sorrows are known to Sid firsthand. In a word, Tarakany! have recorded their most integral, and, at the same time, most versatile album, delivering teeth grinding hardcore-punk ("Vykhod V Gorod"), surf-rock ("Almazy I Istrebiteli"), as well as late Social Distortion-style punk ballads ("To, Chto Ne Ubivaet Tebya").

Rolling Stone

From 2010 to 2012, the band released several EPs. One of those tracks, "V Den', Kogda Ya Sdalsya", was a collaboration with Sergei Mikhalok, the leader of the legendary Belarusian band Lyapis Trubetskoy (and, later, the band Brutto, which was prohibited to perform in Russia). "Sobachye Serdtse" ("Heart of a Dog") another of the EP tracks, dedicated itself to the idea of treating homeless people humanely, and this subject was dealt with poignantly in its music video.

In mid-2010, while playing at the Tornado festival in Miass, Russia, a small group of armed individuals broke into the festival grounds and began beating spectators and shooting in the direction of the stage with firearms and other lethal weapons during Tarakany!'s performance. The incident was widely covered by Russian media, and the ensuing trial lasted several years. Spring 2011 was Tarakany!'s 20th Anniversary, and was celebrated by holding a concert at Arena Moscow (3,500 people). Then afterwards, again Tarakany! toured Europe with Tagada Jones, performed with Oi Polloi, Street Dogs, and the Mahones at the Zikenstock Festival.

In 2011, by signing an open letter in support of Belarusian political prisoners, the band was placed on the so-called "black list" of artists who are ineligible to perform within the borders of Belarus. This unfortunate situation resulted in the cancellation of the planned Belarusian tour immediately after the European gigs. The band finally returned to Belarus three years later. First, with a trial, unannounced, secret gig, and then later on with a full-scale publicized live show.

In 2012, at the Kubana Open-Air Festival (which was outrageously and officially banned the next year due to an incident involving the Bloodhound Gang and the Russian flag.) On stage, Tarakany! expressed their support and solidarity with Pussy Riot, and almost immediately afterwards, the festival organizers stopped Tarakany!'s performance and would not permit them to continue. Additionally, Tarakany! showed their support for Pussy Riot later in 2012 by posting an Internet compilation titled "Release!" covered with symbolic artwork.

In 2013, FeeLee Records released both parts of Tarakany!'s new double-album, MaximumHappy. For this album, they invited special guests such as Chris Barker (Anti-Flag), Yotam Ben-Horin (Useless ID), Rodrigo González (Die Ärzte), and singer-songwriter Frank Turner. It was the first time Tarakany! found themselves in the No. 1 position on the Nashe Radio Russian rock chart, Chartova Dyuzhina, with their song "Pyat' Slov" featuring guest vocals by Lousine Gevorkian of Louna. The track remained on the charts for 20 weeks, which resulted in it being named the No. 1 song in Russia for 2013. One other song also earned No. 1 honors in 2013 on the Nashe charts: Tarakany!'s, "Samiy Schastlivy Chelovek Na Zemle" featuring the group Anacondaz. Officially, the two Tarakany! tracks received co-honors from Nashe. The videos for both songs accumulated over 1 million views each on YouTube. There were other videos from the album as well, including for the track, "Bog I Politisiya" ("God and Police") jointly made with Chris Barker of Anti-Flag. The music video for the song "Plokhie Tantsory" ("Schlechte Tänzer") featuring Rodrigo González from Die Ärzte, was deleted by YouTube's administrators 10 hours after being uploaded due to numerous complaints because of profanity. It did manage to rack up more than 100,000 hits during that ten hours. The MaximumHappy double LP was followed by MaximumHappy Live, and contained live stage performances of all the songs from both parts of the studio release. Right after New Years in 2014, Los Angeles punk label, Punk Outlaw Records, published Tarakany!'s first American release, Russian Democrazy. This album contained six new English songs and a compilation of the band's earlier tracks in English.

Their sound at times reminds you of classic essential punk-rock music like Pennywise but the message is as politically charged as Anti-Flag… Other stand out tracks from the album would be #10 - Smile (Because It Irritates Them) and #11 — Anesthesia; and my favorite lyrics are from the first song on the album is Heart of a Dog "fear, afraid of the things that I see." Although Russia's political outrage has been more transparent than that of the United States over the last half of a century I can certainly relate to this line because I am afraid of what I see in my own country these days. Overall I really dig this album and I have added it to my keeper collection far away from the garage sale bargain pile that I've compiled and that crap that ends up in my desktop recycle bin. Dyingscene.com, 4/5 Stars

In 2015, Tarakany! got mixed up in a scandal regarding a military equipment exhibition relating to the overall militarization of the Nashestvie Festival, the biggest Russian rock festival in the country. The band performed a set of anti-war songs and appealed to the audience between songs with messages of peace. As a result, the band was badly ostracised for their position by the organisers and also by the most reactionary spectators.

In early 2016, Tarakany! celebrated their 25th anniversary with four concerts in one of the biggest club venues in Moscow, Glavclub/Yotaspace, for a total of 8,000 people give or take. Also, the band had two shows in club Avrora (St. Petersburg) (4,000 people). The resulting tour included more than 40 dates in Russia and Belarus. In early 2017, Soyuz Music released Larger than… Live!, a triple combo outfit featuring two audio CDs and one DVD from their Moscow performances and include tracks from other artists such as Siberian Meat Grinder, Distemper, Louna, Lumen, and many others.

In November 2016, Tarakany! released their new album, Sila Odnogo (The Power of One) on the Soyuz Music label. The band is currently awaiting their first truly global release in 2018 on the American label A-F Records. Their first global release is an English language version of Silo Odnogo, appropriately titled, The Power of One.

In early September 2017, the group decided to try something a bit different. For a project called, Much Ado About Nothing, they decided to lock themselves in a small house in a village for 11 days, and write, record, and release one song every day from the process. The resulting material was collected and turned into an album called, A Lot of Noise from Nothing: The Album, and was released December 2017. Among the guests on the album are musicians from the Russian groups: Pornofilmi, Teni Svobodi, Plan Lomonosov, SMEX, Animal Jazz, Useless ID (Israel), and others.

In addition to the global release in 2018, they also released a split album made in collaboration with Israel's Useless ID, called Among Other Zeros and Ones.

== Other projects of musicians ==
Projects of the former members of Tarakany! include:

- Yuri Lenin (vocals, guitars). Later: Lady's Man, Mechanical Poet, Cathouse
- Denis Petukhov (vocals, keyboards). Later: Naive, Masha I Medvedi, Butch, WK?, t.A.T.u.
- Vladimir Rodionov (guitars). Later: Ulyi, Shashki, Priklyucheniya Electronikov, Amudarya
- Denis Rubanov (drums, percussion). Later: Tushka, Ruban.
- Konstantin Dementyev (drums, percussion). Later: Berrimor, Chervona Rutta, Mad Band
- Alexander Golant (guitars). Later: Naive, TRI-15
- Alexey Solovyov (bass). Later: TRI-15, 1.5 kg Otlichnogo Pyure, Teni Svobody
- Segey Batrakov (drums, percussion). Later: Stas Mikhaylov
- Denis Khromykh (guitars). Later: Plan Lomonosova
- Andrey Shmorgun (bass). Later: Plan Lomonosova
- Nikolay Stravinskiy (guitars). Later: Selfieman

Other projects of the current lineup of Tarakany! include:

- Dmitry 'Sid' Spirin: Priklyucheniya Electronikov (1999-2004), Lazy Bitches (2007–2009), Zuname (2005–2008), Rakety Iz Rossii (2011–present)
- Sergey Prokofyev: Priklyucheniya Electronikov (1999–present), TRI-15 (2002–2005)
- Alexander Pronin: Agitators (2006–present)
- Dmitry Kezhvatov: Priklyucheniya Electronikov (2004–2006), Spifire (2006–2013), SMG (2015–2016), Teni Svobody (2006), Optimystica Orchestra

== Activism ==
The band's musicians actively support animal-rights and social initiatives by posting video appeals and participating in campaigns of various organizations like the WWF, Golos Za Pravo Zhivotnykh, and others. In their songs and interviews, the musicians actively advocate for a meatless way of life.

In 1996, the band became a participant of Uchites Plavat, a movement of alternative rock musicians against heavy drugs, fascism, and racism, as well as the radio programme, audio compilations, and festivals of the same name.

In 1998, Tarakany! volunteered to participate in an "anti-drug" tour of several of Moscow's schools. For two weeks, they performed for different students at different schools and warned them about the dangers of heavy drugs.

In 1999, Tarakany! initiated a set of audio compilations and festivals called, Tipa Punki I Vsyo Takoe, to help out and support punk/hardcore beginners. In total, they released six parts of the compilation and helped many people to discover a lot of new names.

Since 2000, Tarakany! has been actively participating in events organized by the Russian non-profit foundation Net Alkogolizmu I Narkomanii (NAN), an organization similar in most respects to AA and NA. In particular, Tarkany! has been performing in several anti-AIDS campaigns.

In 2005, Tarakany! performed at a charity concert to support the musicians of other punk bands who suffered from the Nazi skirmishes.

The band is constantly cooperating with the charitable foundation AdVita in aiding children and adults suffering from cancer. Also, they regularly perform at concerts in support of the B.E.L.A. Deti-Babochiki (Children to Butterflies) fund, which comprehensively aids children who suffer from a rare genetic disease known as epidermolysis bullosa. In addition to direct aid to children, the charity also donates to the Scientific Research Center of Pediatric Oncology, Nastien'ka, established to help children treated by the Scientific Research Centre of Paediatric Oncology.

In 2012, Tarakany! organized the charity rock fair, Sobachye Serdtse, and donated all proceeds to Moscow's homeless. Also, the band performed a concert at the Moscow Institute of Emergency Care for the campaign, My Odnoy Krovi, which is interested in having rock musicians encourage the public to more regularly donate blood.

In 2017, Tarakany! supported social campaign Producty V Glubinku to help to provide food for the elderly and poor. In 2017, Tarakany! took part in a charitable programme Kislorod, under the auspices of Planeta.ru, a Russian crowd-funding platform, aimed at helping people with cystic fibrosis.
