= Fetch (album) =

Studio album by Melt-Banana
- Released: October 1, 2013
- Recorded: Studio Ghost, Tokyo, Japan
- Genres: Noise rock; experimental rock; hardcore punk
- Length: 32:10
- Label: A-ZAP
- Producer: Melt-Banana

Melt-Banana chronology
Melt-Banana Lite Live Ver 0.0 (2009)	Fetch (2013)	Return of 13 Hedgehogs (2015)

Fetch is the eighth album by the Japanese noise rock band Melt-Banana. It was released on October 1, 2013, on CD, LP and digitally.

== Background and recording ==
Fetch was Melt-Banana's first studio album in six years, after Bambi's Dilemma in 2007. During that time, the band toured extensively, including a U.S. tour with Tool, and playing at the Sydney Opera House with Lou Reed's Metal Machine Trio. Band members Yasuko Onuki and Ichirou Agata also performed shows as "Melt-Banana Lite", an alternate configuration of the band that uses synthesizers instead of guitars and drums, and released a live album, Melt-Banana Lite Live Ver 0.0, in 2009. By mid-2012, Melt-Banana was performing exclusively as a duo of Onuki and Agata, using synthesizers in place of live bass and drums.

Writing for Fetch began in late 2010, and the demos were "almost done" by March 2011. However, production was postponed after the Tohoku earthquake and the aftermath of the subsequent meltdown at Fukushima Daiichi Nuclear Power Plant, for both practical and personal reasons. Although both members said that their everyday lives were not majorly impacted, Onuki "felt something had been changed in [her] mind", while Agata "could not concentrate writing music in the same manner [he] used to". An American tour had been planned to promote a then-upcoming album, but because of the delay, it was instead done without an accompanying album. Agata credited the two-month tour to helping him get his mind off of Japan. Melt-Banana returned to the studio in the winter of 2012 and finished the album by May 2013.

Agata employed a different guitar style on Fetch, using fewer effects and pedals and more tracks. He recorded short bits of guitar and used them as loops.

The album has two instances of field recordings, both captured by Agata. The waves that open the album were included because he felt the bubble sounds were similar to the guitar loops he recorded. The frogs on "Zero+" were recorded in Tokushima.

Following the release of the album, the band toured North America.

== Critical reception ==
Professional ratings
Aggregate scores
Source	Rating
Metacritic	80/100
Review scores
Source	Rating
AllMusic	4/5 stars
Paste	8.0/10
Pitchfork	7.8/10
PopMatters	9/10 stars
Razorcake	(positive)
Tiny Mix Tapes	3/5 stars

Fetch received mostly positive reviews from music critics. The aggregate review site Metacritic assigns an average score of 80 out of 100 to the album based on 12 reviews, indicating "generally favorable reviews".

Writing for AllMusic, Matt Collar described Fetch as "a monstrously frenetic, high-energy blast of anthemic bubble-punk and passionate noise-rock." Referencing the delayed line-up changes and delayed production, he wrote "Melt Banana's sound is still as huge as ever ... Each song on Fetch feels so meticulous and so conscientiously crafted, it's hard to listen to it without arriving at a cliched but undeniable truism: good things come to those who wait."

Benjamin Hedge Olson of PopMatters praised the album as "the amalgamation of everything that Melt-Banana have done throughout their career", and described it as "relentlessly playful, without ever seeming like just a joke, or like some tired exercise in hipster irony", and that "there is more imagination and personality on Fetch than on any other record you are likely to come across." In Paste, Garrett Martin praised the band's marriage of noise and pop, writing that "the band might regularly untether itself from the traditional expectations of pop songcraft, but despite the bits of noise and brutality, Fetch remains a thoroughly catchy record." Pitchfork's Jason Heller called it "some of the best music of their career". In a mixed review for Tiny Mix Tapes, Paul Haney wrote that Fetch "explores the fuzz-pop histrionics even further, making for a Melt-Banana that's far more buoyant and melodious, though just as vigorously propulsive in its delivery", but found that "while Melt-Banana's journey into comparatively accessible modes of expression hardly feels cynical or calculated, it does sacrifice a particular animalistic tension that made their most classic albums so thrilling and otherworldly." David Cirone of J-Generation cited the break from the band's 1-2 minute songs, saying "Fetch hits with such force that it seems to muscle out their past work while adding another cohesive layer to the band’s legacy of digital-rock psychosis."

=== Accolades ===
Fetch was named "Album of the Week" by Spin magazine on September 23, 2013. Rolling Stone named Fetch the 17th best metal album of 2013.

== Track listing ==
All tracks are written by Melt-Banana.

No.	Title	Length
1.	"Candy Gun"	4:07
2.	"The Hive"	2:14
3.	"Vertigo Game"	1:26
4.	"Lefty Dog (Run, Caper, Run)"	1:52
5.	"Infection Defective"	4:10
6.	"My Missing Link"	3:40
7.	"Zero+"	2:06
8.	"Schemes of the Tails"	3:47
9.	"Lie Lied Lies"	2:03
10.	"Red Data, Red Stage"	1:41
11.	"Then Red Eyed"	1:19
12.	"Zero"	3:45

== Personnel ==
- Yasuko Onuki – vocals
- Ichirou Agata – electric guitar
