= Melt-Banana Lite Live Ver 0.0 =

Live album by Melt-Banana
- Released: November 3, 2009
- Recorded: 2009
- Length: 27:21
- Label: A-Zap

Melt-Banana chronology
Bambi's Dilemma (2007)	Melt-Banana Lite Live Ver 0.0 (2009)	Fetch (2013)

Professional ratings
Review scores
Source	Rating
Rock Sound	7/10 stars

Melt-Banana Lite Live ver 0.0 is a live album by Melt-Banana. It was released on November 3, 2009.

== Background and recording ==
Melt-Banana perform some of their shows under the name "Melt-Banana Lite", an alternate configuration of the band that replaces guitars and drums with samplers and synthesizers; some shows additionally replaced the drum kit with a drum machine. This set-up was prompted, in part, by the difficulties of transporting instruments while touring, and a desire to make it easier and more convenient. Musically, the style was suggested by vocalist Yasuko Onuki, who made some demos that featured only drums, a theremin and her vocals. As Onuki came up with the idea ahead of a planned tour with drummer Dave Witte, guitarist Ichirou Agata believed she wanted to highlight the speed of Witte's drumming by removing the guitars. After their tour with Witte, Melt-Banana continued to play shows under the new configuration, typically with a drum machine.

== Reception ==
Alex Deller of Rock Sound gave it a 7/10, saying that despite the change in instruments, "this is still the bat-shit crazy Melt-Banana that have had you crawling the walls for the best part of 15 years."

== Track listing ==
All tracks are written by Melt-Banana.

No.	Title	Length
1.	"Feedback Deficiency"	3:03
2.	"T for Tone"	0:15
3.	"Slide Down"	0:55
4.	"One Drop, One Life"	1:05
5.	"Dig a Pit"	1:11
6.	"In Store"	4:41
7.	"Cat and the Blood"	3:30
8.	"Chain Keeper"	1:31
9.	"Dog Song"	1:19
10.	"Lock the Head"	0:27
11.	"Last Target on the Last Day"	5:08
12.	"Humming Jackalope, Waiting for the Storm..."	4:16
