= It's in the Pillcase =

EP by Melt-Banana
- Released: July 1995
- Recorded: February 1995
- Length: 4:21
- Label: Skin Graft Records
- Producer: KK Null

It's in the Pillcase is a Melt-Banana 7" EP released in July 1995 on Skin Graft Records. It was their first proper US release.

The cover art was drawn by Rob Syers and the 7" came with a comic book with comics by Sonny Rosenberg called "Aesthetic Deficit" and "Crabby-Love Sue Hero" by Mark Fischer. The original pressing came in a silver sleeve; it was later repressed with a blue sleeve and different pictures inside.

== Track listing ==
=== Side A ===
1. "It's in the Pillcase" – 1:17

=== Side B ===
1. "Rush &->Warp" – 1:04
2. "Picnic in Panic" – 2:00
