= 13 Hedgehogs (MxBx Singles 1994–1999) =

Compilation album by Melt-Banana
- Released: May 17, 2005
- Recorded: 1993–1998
- Genre: Noise rock, punk rock
- Label: A-Zap

Melt-Banana chronology
| Cell-Scape (2003) | 13 Hedgehogs (MxBx Singles 1994–1999) (2005) | Bambi's Dilemma (2007) |

13 Hedgehogs (MxBx Singles 1994–1999) is the first compilation album by Melt-Banana. It features their first 13 singles, EPs and split records on one CD.

Since Melt-Banana's very first release was a 7-inch EP called Hedgehog they refer to all their minor releases (singles, EPs and splits) as hedgehogs. This contains the first 13, and so far they have released 23 "hedgehogs".

== Track listing ==
| No. | Title | Length |
|---|---|---|
| 1. | "Stick Out" | 0:48 |
| 2. | "So Unfilial Rule" | 0:14 |
| 3. | "Mind Thief" | 1:44 |
| 4. | "Screw, Loose" | 0:23 |
| 5. | "Scrubber" | 0:16 |
| 6. | "Pierced Eye" | 2:11 |
| 7. | "Ketchup-Mess" | 1:16 |
| 8. | "First Defy" | 0:10 |
| 9. | "Iguana in Trouble" | 1:26 |
| 10. | "It's in the Pillcase" | 1:17 |
| 11. | "Rush & Warp" | 1:04 |
| 12. | "Picnic in Panic" | 2:00 |
| 13. | "Buddhism Core" | 0:55 |
| 14. | "Hangnail (Let It Go)" | 0:39 |
| 15. | "No One Wants Next One" | 0:38 |
| 16. | "Sicklist on Fire" | 1:06 |
| 17. | "One Dimensional" | 0:20 |
| 18. | "Not D, But M, Also S" | 0:43 |
| 19. | "Mind Thief" (live) | 1:35 |
| 20. | "P-Pop-Slop" (live) | 1:29 |
| 21. | "Making Fuss, Fuss, Fuss" | 0:37 |
| 22. | "Turtle vs. Bunny (Who One?)" | 0:56 |
| 23. | "Pig to Dog" | 0:19 |
| 24. | "Bird-Like Monkey in Cave, Singing in Drops" | 2:06 |
| 25. | "Bad Gut Missed Fist" | 1:09 |
| 26. | "It's Not My Fault" | 0:22 |
| 27. | "Neck on Me" | 0:26 |
| 28. | "Stop the Cook-Cu Test" | 0:25 |
| 29. | "No Doubt" | 1:03 |
| 30. | "Scooped Brain in a Cup" | 1:02 |
| 31. | "Capital 1060" | 0:53 |
| 32. | "How to Parlare" | 0:27 |
| 33. | "I Say, 'Shoot!'" | 0:40 |
| 34. | "Minus-Minus-To One" | 0:23 |
| 35. | "Call Me Please-6824" | 0:22 |
| 36. | "Popsy Teeth in Red" | 0:19 |
| 37. | "Blackout Screen" | 1:56 |
| 38. | "To Be Continued?" | 0:24 |
| 39. | "$10 a Pile" (Ax version) | 2:00 |
| 40. | "Disposable Weathercock" (Helpful 80 Points version) | 4:05 |
| 41. | "Y-Axis" | 0:29 |
| 42. | "Aquatic Bee" | 1:51 |
| 43. | "Wedge!" | 1:57 |
| 44. | "Seesaw Semiology" | 0:59 |
| 45. | "Cough, Coughed, Coughing" | 0:54 |
| 46. | "Q For Quinine" | 1:00 |
| 47. | "Bird-Like-Monkey, Pt. 2" | 0:07 |
| 48. | "Least Clipper" | 1:47 |
| 49. | "Baby Buggy Spitted" | 1:18 |
| 50. | "Drill the Dentist" | 0:39 |
| 51. | "Last Finger Split" | 1:47 |
| 52. | "West the Fist (Just For Reflection)" | 4:04 |
| 53. | "Dead Spex" | 1:01 |
| 54. | "Sonic Brain Burst" | 1:11 |
| 55. | "Ether Twisted" | 1:11 |
| 56. | "Shoot the Moon" | 0:58 |

== Track information ==
- Tracks 1–6 from Hedgehog 7-inch EP (Charnel Music, 1994)
- Tracks 7–9 from split 7-inch EP w/ God Is My Co-Pilot (HG Fact, 1994)
- Tracks 10–12 from It's In the Pillcase 7-inch EP (Skin Graft Records, 1995)
- Tracks 13–18 from split 7-inch EP w/ Discordance Axis (HG Fact, 1995)
- Tracks 19–20 from split 7-inch EP w/ Pencilneck (Anti-Music, 1995)
- Tracks 21–24 from split 7-inch EP w/ Target Shoppers (Destroy All Music and Betley Welcome Careful Driver, 1996)
- Tracks 25–38 from split 10-inch EP w/ Stilluppsteypa (Fire inc./Something Weird, 1996)
- Tracks 39–40 from untitled (Piano One) 7-inch EP (Gentle Giant, 1996)
- Tracks 41–42 from split 7-inch EP w/ Plainfield (Smelly Records, 1997)
- Tracks 43–50 from Eleventh 7-inch EP (Slap a Ham Records, 1997)
- Track 51 from split 5" EP w/ Xerobot (Coat-Tail, 1998)
- Track 52 from split 7-inch EP w/ Killout Trash (Kool Pop Recordings/Rodel Records, 1998)
- Tracks 53–56 from Dead Spex 7-inch EP (HG Fact, 1998)
