= Mechanical Poet =

Russian metal band

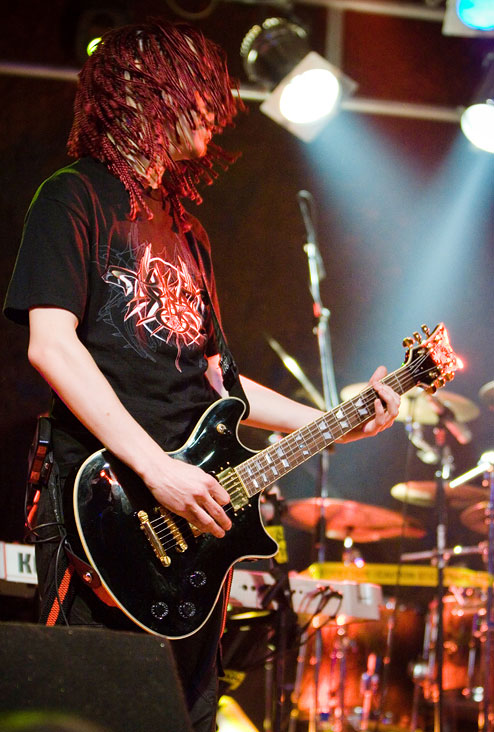

Background information
- Origin: Moscow, Russia
- Genres: Symphonic metal, progressive metal, new prog, post-progressive
- Years active: 2002–2009
- Labels: Aural Music, CD-Maximum, SPV, The End Records
- Members: Lex Plotnikoff
- Past members: Vladimir Ermakoff; Jerry Lenin; Vladimir Nasonoff; Max Samosvat; Tom Tokmakoff; Serge Khlebnikoff; Sebastian Trifonoff
- Website: mechanicalpoet.lexolantern.com

Mechanical Poet was a Russian metal band formed in Moscow, Russia, in 2002, led by composer, guitarist and keyboardist Lex Plotnikoff (1977-2022). The band released concept albums in post-prog and symphonic progressive metal genres with orchestral arrangements and heavy use of keyboards. Its music is strongly influenced by film score composers like Danny Elfman, and its lyrics are based on fantasy, gothic and science fiction stories. The band split in 2009, however, Plotnikoff continued releasing his music under various new aliases until his death in 2022.

== History ==
Mechanical Poet was founded in 2002 as a studio project by ex-members of Russian avantgarde act Glazemaker Lex Plotnikoff and Tom Tokmakoff.

For a few years the band known as Glazemaker was working on creating a "sound" of their own, till they evolved a sound which was a mixture between melodic metal with progressive metal riffs and symphonic orchestrations using electronic instruments.

In 2003, Sebastian Trifonoff left the band and was soon replaced by Epidemia frontman Max Samosvat. With the new singer the band released its first EP, Handmade Essence. After the EP the band received several offers from various music companies, and finally signed a record deal with Italian label Aural Music.

In 2004, the debut album Woodland Prattlers, was released. Though the album had sold well, the union of Plotnikoff, Tokmakoff and Samosvat split in 2005 due to artistic disagreements.

In 2006, Mechanical Poet returned with a new line-up: singer Jerry Lenin (ex-4 Tarakana, Lady's Man), guitar player Lex Plotnikoff, drummer Vladimir Ermakoff (also Black Obelisk) and bass player Serge Khlebnikoff. In this line-up the band made their first ever live show (Plan B Club, Moscow, 04/08/2007) and released their third album Creepy Tales For Freaky Children (with session work of Epidemia bass player Ivan Izotov). The album had simpler arrangements with a more post-prog sound, something that was not accepted well by many metal fans of the band. Nevertheless, the album was highly acclaimed by punk and alternative rock audience. The album had bonus tracks in Russian, which was the first time the band had Russian songs. After the release of the album, Serge Khlebnikoff left Mechanical Poet.

In 2007, the band released another concept album, Who Did It To Michelle Waters? A double album telling a story about a suicide of a girl and the circumstances that led her to that. The double album consisted of two parts, Music From And Inspired By The Original Sad Story and Original Score. The bass session player on the album was Daniel Zakharenkoff (a member of Black Obelisk).

2008 saw band with new vocalist, Vladimir Nasonoff, and a new concept album Eidoline: the Arrakeen Code, based on Frank Herbert's Dune series. The album was well received by Russian media: Mir Fantastiki magazine rated it 9 out of 10 and named it the best sci-fi/fantasy concept album of 2008; Dark City magazine awarded it with 4 stars out of 5.

On June 7, 2009, Mechanical Poet played their last show featuring ex-singers Max Samosvat and Jerry Lenin and announced they were going on indefinite hiatus. Since then, several side projects from the band's members appeared, including Luna Damien by Plotnikoff and Lenin, Sunburst by Samosvat and Nasonoff, Hattifatteners, Last Fighter and Mistland Prattlers by Plotnikoff.

On March 1, 2017, PLotnikoff announced in the official VK community that Mechanical Poet is recording a new album called The Midnight Carol That an Imp Has Sought. The release, however, was delayed indefinitely due to Plotnikoff's health problems. On June 28, 2022, his personal VK page reported that Plotnikoff died.

== Band members ==
- Lex Plotnikoff – guitars, keyboards, vocals (2002–2009)
- Vladimir Nasonoff – vocals (2008–2009)
- Vladimir Ermakoff – drums (2005–2009)
- Max Samosvat – vocals (2003–2006)
- Tom Tokmakoff – drums (2003–2005)
- Serge Khlebnikoff – bass (2006–2007)

=== Session and guest members ===
- Sebastian Trifonoff - original singer who left the band before its first album release
- Ivan Izotov – recorded bass for "Creepy Tales For Freaky Children" (2007)
- Nik Simonoff – played bass in the period from December 2007 to February 2008
- Alexander Shvetz – played bass in the period from February 2008 to April 2008
- Alexander Tavrizian - live keyboards (2008–2009)
- Danila Zakharenkov - live bass (2008–2009)
- Jerry Lenin - vocals (2006-2008, 2017)
- Kirill Kachanov - drums (2017)
- Anastasia Petrenko - vocals (2017)
- Innar Hanum - vocals (2017)
- Veronika Barbutskaya - vocals (2017)
- Isadora Cortina - vocals (2017)

== Discography ==
- 2003 - Handmade Essence (EP)
- 2004 - Woodland Prattlers
- 2007 - Creepy Tales For Freaky Children
- 2007 - Who Did It To Michelle Waters?
- 2008 - Eidoline: The Arrakeen Code
- 2008 - Ghouls (CDS)

=== Side projects discography ===
- 2010 - Hattifatteners - Stories from the Clay Shore
- 2011 - Luna Damien - Muddlewood
- 2015 - Mistland Prattlers - Music of Mistland, Luceria and the Ocean of Sunset
- 2017 - Last Fighter - Neon Children
- 2020 - Barrel Wight
