= Elfiiskaya rukopis =

Elven Manuscript

Studio album by Epidemia
- Released: 2004
- Recorded: 2004
- Genre: Power metal
- Length: 64:37
- Label: Moroz records
- Producer: Vladimir Holstinin

Epidemia chronology
The Riddle of the Faerie Land (2001)	Elven Manuscript (2004)	Living in Twilight (2005)

Elfiyskaya Rukopis (Эльфийская Рукопись, Elven Manuscript, 2004) is a metal opera and concept album by Russian power metal band Epidemia. Vocalists from Aria, Arida Vortex, Master, Black Obelisk and Boney NEM participated in the opera. The album was produced by Vladimir Holstinin (Aria's guitarist), who also played the lute at track 4.

== Opera Scenario ==
The scenario of the opera is an epic fantasy story, written by Yuri Melisov, lead guitarist of Epidemia. Some parts of the story are influenced by Dragonlance and The Lord of the Rings.

Desmond the half-elf grew up in the elven kingdom of Enia, hidden from the whole world by a magic barrier, and learned the magic from the king's wizard, Irdis. He fell in love with the princess Alatiel and was exiled by the elven king. Desmond continued his studies in the magic school of the human lands, and participated in some adventurers' campaigns. There, he saved Thorwald the knight, who became his best friend.

At this time, Enia was attacked by the dark forces from the otherworld, led by Deimos. The otherworld, where Deimos ruled, was doomed because of its dying sun. Using the El-Gilet sphere, Deimos wished to teleport his whole army to Enia and conquer this new world. Deimos demanded Alatiel become his wife, which would let him be the legal king of the elven lands. He threatened that princess would otherwise be sacrificed in the sphere ritual, which required elven blood, but the brave maiden refused his offer.

Irdis the wizard was hurt while fighting the invaders but escaped through the portal to Desmond and asked him to save his homeland. Desmond agreed, hoping this deed would clear his name, and asked Thorwald to join him in his campaign. On their way, they met the inn's Tavern Master, who was instructed by Irdis and showed them the secret undermountain tunnel to Enia.

While walking through the tunnel, Desmond felt the presence of ancient magic and found the Scepter of The First Kings of Enia. They used this magic device to defeat the Dragon sent by Deimos. Followed by the remainder of elven knights, they stormed up into the king's palace, where Deimos was trying to complete the ritual. During the fight, Thorwald destroyed the sphere with the rod. Deimos escaped through the window and fled away on his dragon.

Desmond married Alatiel, though Irdis served as the regent and the real ruler until Desmond and Alatiel's children grew up, because the half-elf exile could not be crowned as the king.

== Track listing ==
No.	Title	Length
1.	"Золотые драконы" (Zolotye drakony "Golden Dragons"; intro)	1:35
2.	"Час испытания" (Chas ispytaniya "Trial Time")	4:53
3.	"Рожденный Для Битвы" (Rozhdeonny dlya bitvy "Born for Battle")	6:12
4.	"Пройди свой путь" (Proydi svoy put' "Make It Through Your Way")	5:17
5.	"Кровь Эльфов" (Krov' elfov "Blood of the Elves")	9:49
6.	"На Пороге Ада" (Na poroge ada "At the Hell's Threshold")	6:29
7.	"Вечный Воитель" (Vechny voitel "The Eternal Warrior")	4:59
8.	"Романс о слезе" (Romans o sleze "A Ballad about the Tear")	6:29
9.	"Магия и меч" (Magia i mech "Magic and Sword")	5:44
10.	"Осколки прошлого" (Oskolki proshlogo "Shards of the Past")	4:21
11.	"Эпилог" (Epilog "Epilogue"; outro)	3:50
12.	"Всадник из льда" (Vsadnik iz l'da "Rider of Ice")	5:12
Total length:		64:55

All tracks by Yuri 'Juron' Melisov except tracks 3, 4 by Melisov/Pavel 'Bush' Bushuyev, track 5 by Melisov/Ilya Kniazev and track 9 by Roman Valeriev.

Track 12 is not a part of the opera but the bonus track on Elven Manuscript CD.

== Starring ==
- Desmond the half-elf – Max Samosvat (Epidemia)
- Thorwald the knight – Andrey Lobashov (Arida Vortex)
- Irdis the elven wizard – Arthur Berkut (Aria)
- Deimos the dark lord – Dmitry Borisenkov (Black Obelisk)
- Sky the blue dragon – Kirill Nemolyaev (Boney NEM)
- Alatiel the elven princess – Anastasia Chebotareva
- Tavern Master – Lexx (Alexey Kravchenko) (Master)

== Sequels ==
Epidemia released Elven Manuscript 2: the Tale for All Times in 2007.

Epidemia's ex-drummer Andrey Laptev has tried to record his apocryphal sequel to the opera, entitled 'The Battle of Gods,' though he was not allowed to use the copyrighted name, logo and characters.

Epidemia released Treasure Of Enia in 2014 as sequel to Elven Manuscript 2: the Tale for All Times.
