= Epidemia =

Russian band

Эпидемия Epidemia
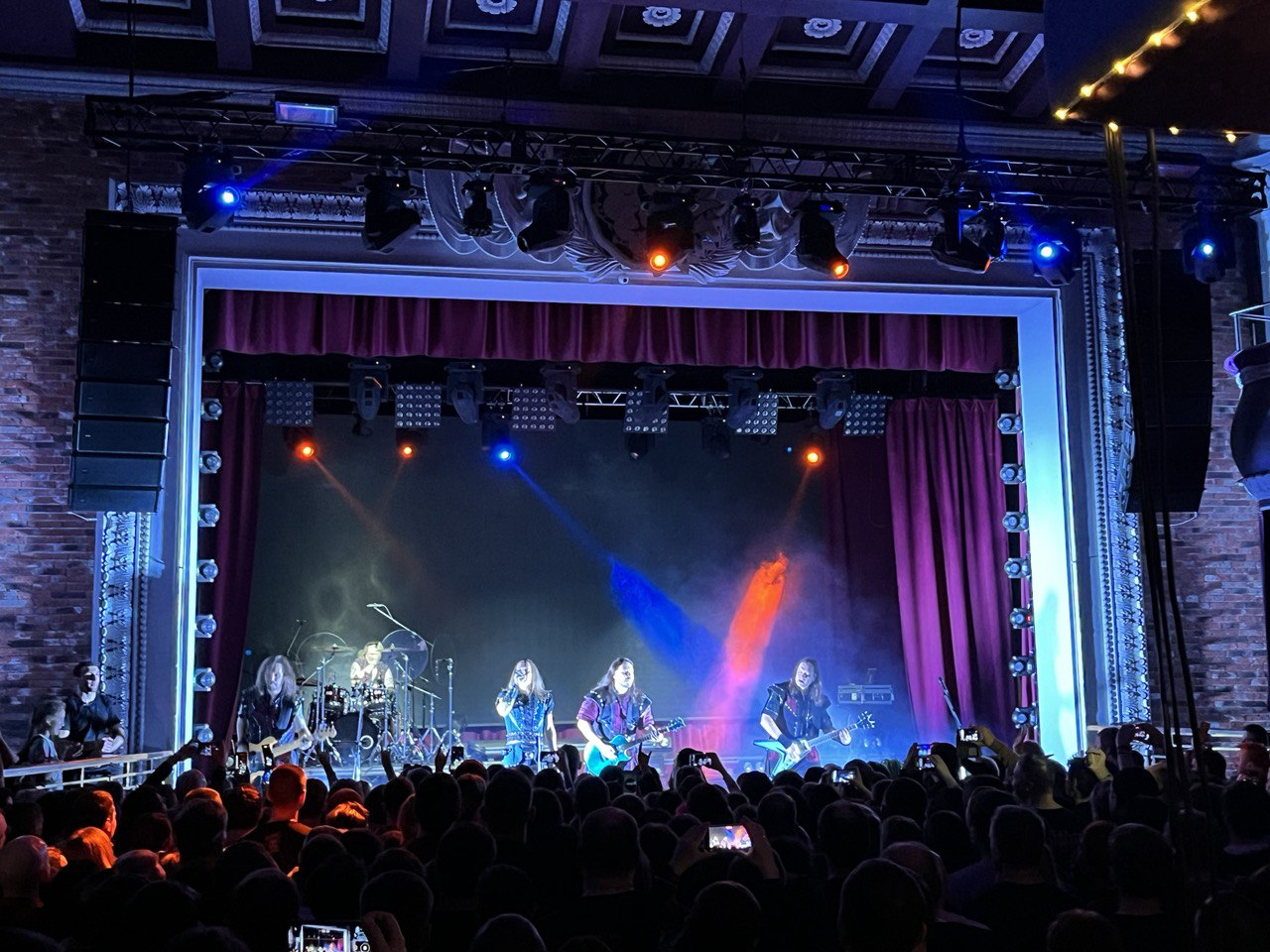
- Epidemia, 2023

Background information
- Origin: Moscow, Russia
- Genre: Power metal
- Years active: 1993 (unofficial), 1995–present
- Label: CD-Maximum
- Members: Yuri Melisov; Eugeny Egorov; Ilya Mamontov; Dmitry Protsko; Dmitry Ivanov; Dmitry Krivenkov
- Past members: Pavel Okunev; Ilya Knyazev; Roman Valeriev; Pavel Bushuev; Evgeny Laikov; Roman Zakharov; Ivan Izotov, Max Samosvat, etc.

Epidemia (Russian: Эпидемия, sometimes referred to as 'Epi' by fans) is a Russian power metal band famous for doing the Elven Manuscript metal opera in 2004. It was formed by guitarist Yuri "Juron" Melisov in 1993, with the first songs made in 1995.

== History ==
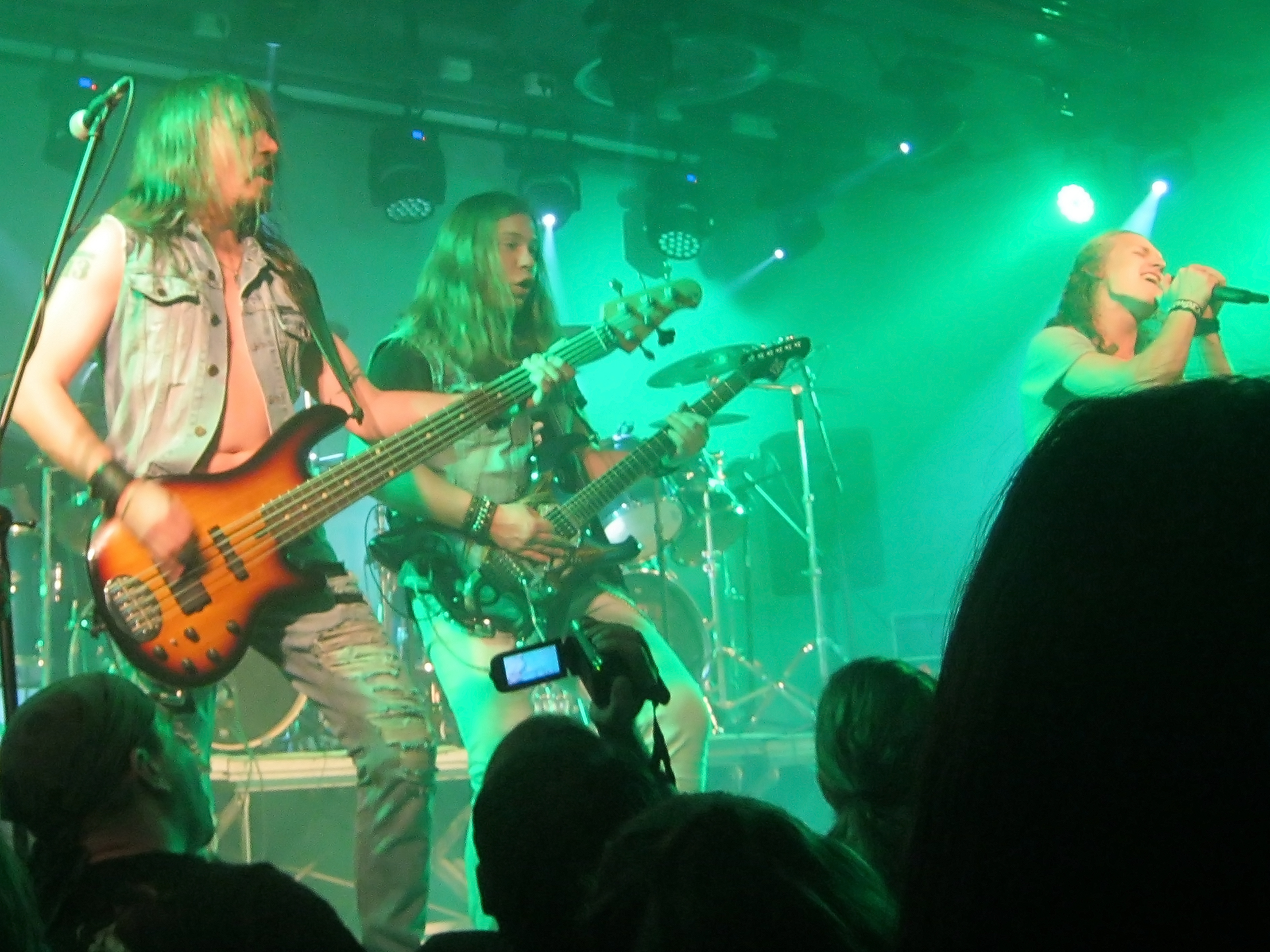
Epidemia in Israel, 2015

In 1993, the as-yet unnamed group recorded the demo album Phoenix, with Melisov performing both guitars and vocals. Melisov came up with the name "Epidemia" (Russian for epidemic) in 1995. Vocalist Pavel Okunev and guitarist-songwriter Roman Zakharov joined Epidemia to record the debut studio release Volya k Zhizni (Will to Live) a lo-fi EP with five tracks. The follow-up, Na Krayu Vremeni (At the Edge of Time) was the band's first full-length CD. It was recorded by the line-up of Yuri Melisov (guitar), Roman Zakharov (guitar), Pavel Okunev (vocals), Ilya Knyazev (bass) and Andrey Laptev (drums).

In 2000, Maxim Samosvat, who was a member of Mechanical Poet, replaced Okunev on vocals. Epidemia's first release with the new vocalist was Zagadka Volshebnoy Strani (Riddle of the Wonderland). A video was shot for the ballad "Ya Molilsya na Tebya" (I was Praising You) and aired on MTV Russia. Epidemia was nominated for an MTV Europe Music Award in 2002. New line-up changes came after Roman Zakharov (the band's second composer) departed, and Andrey Laptev left the band.

With the new line-up, Melisov decided to complete a conceptual metal opera. Originally, he had planned to create music for the Dragonlance series of fantasy novels, but Epidemia was unable to get rights. Melisov instead wrote his own storyline for the opera, which was similar to the Dragonlance series. In 2004 the conceptual album Elfiyskaya Rukopis (Elven Manuscript), featuring vocalists from Aria, Arida Vortex, Chorny Obelisk and Master, was released. The album was produced by Vladimir Holstinin of Aria fame. Epidemia's presentation of Elven Manuscript together with Aria on February 13, 2004 at the Friday 13 Festival was attended by around 6,000 people.

A year later, Epidemia released the Livin' in Twilight album, consisting of re-recorded songs from their first three albums. Livin' in Twilight was recorded with Ilya "Lars" Mamontov playing second guitar instead of Bushuyev.

A theatrical performance of both parts of Elven Manuscript took place in the Luzhniki Sports Arena on December 3, 2007, and drew 5000 fans. After the 2007 release and show, Epidemia received many offers to play in different Russian cities and CIS countries (Ukraine, Latvia, Armenia).

== Discography ==
| Original title | Transliterated title | Meaning | Year of release |
|---|---|---|---|
| Феникс (demo) | Feniks (demo) | Phoenix (demo) | 1995 |
| Воля к Жизни (EP) | Volya k Zhizni (EP) | Will To Live (EP) | 1998 |
| На Краю Времени | Na Krayu Vremeni | On The Edge Of Time | 1999 |
| Загадка Волшебной Cтраны | Zagadka Volshebnoy Strany | The Quest Of The Magic Land | 2001 |
| Эльфийская Pукопись | El'fiyskaya Rukopis' | Elven Manuscript | 2004 |
| Жизнь в Cумерках | Zhizn' v Sumerkah | Living In Twilight | 2005 |
| Эльфийская Рукопись 2: Сказание На Все Времена | El'fiyskaya Rukopis' 2: Skazanie Na Vse Vremena | Elven Manuscript 2: Saga For All Times | 2007 |
| Сумеречный Ангел (Сингл) | Sumerechniy Angel (single) | Angel of Twilight (single) | 2009 |
| Дорога Домой | Doroga Domoj | Road to Home | 2010 |
| Всадник из Льда | Vsadnik iz L'da | The Ice Rider | 2011 |
| В Трезвучиях Баллад... (концертный альбом) | V trezvuchiyah ballad | In Triads of Ballads... (concert album) | 2012 |
| Сокровище Энии | Sokrovische Enii | Treasure of Enya | 2014 |
| Придумай Светлый Мир (Сингл) | Pridumay Svetliy Mir (single) | Think up a Bright World (single) | 2016 |
| Легенда Ксентарона | Legenda Ksentarona | The Legend of Xentharon | 2018 |
| Вне правил (EP) | Vne pravil (EP) | Beyond the rules (EP) | 2019 |
| Призраки и тени | Prizraki i Teni | Ghosts and shadows | 2021 |

== Members ==
=== Current members ===
- Yury Melisov - guitars (1993–present), vocals (1993–1996)
- Dmitry Krivenkov - drums (2003–present)
- Ilya Mamontov - guitars (2005–2010), bass (2011–present)
- Dmitry Protsko - guitars (2011–present)
- Evgeny Egorov - vocals (2011–present)

=== Past members ===
- Dmitry Shcherbakov - bass (1993–1995)
- Mikhail Yeltsov - drums (1993–1995)
- Aram Oganesyan - guitars (1993–1994)
- Artem Smirnov - bass (1995–1996)
- Andrey Laptev - drums (1995–2002)
- Andrey Manko - guitars (1995–1997)
- Nikolay Turunov - bass (1996–1998)
- Pavel Okunev - vocals (1996–2000)
- Roman Zakharov - guitars (1997–2001)
- Ilya Knyazev - bass (1998–2005)
- Ekaterina Usanova - keyboards (1999)
- Ekaterina Gladkova - keyboards (1999)
- Oleg Pokhvalin - keyboards (2000–2001)
- Maxim Samosvat - vocals (2000–2010)
- Pavel Bushuyev - guitars (2001–2004)
- Roman Valeryev - keyboards (2001–2005)
- Evgeny Laykov - drums (2002–2003)
- Ivan Izotov - bass (2005–2010)
- Dmitry Ivanov - keyboards (2005–2015)

Timeline
