= Distemper (band) =

Russian band

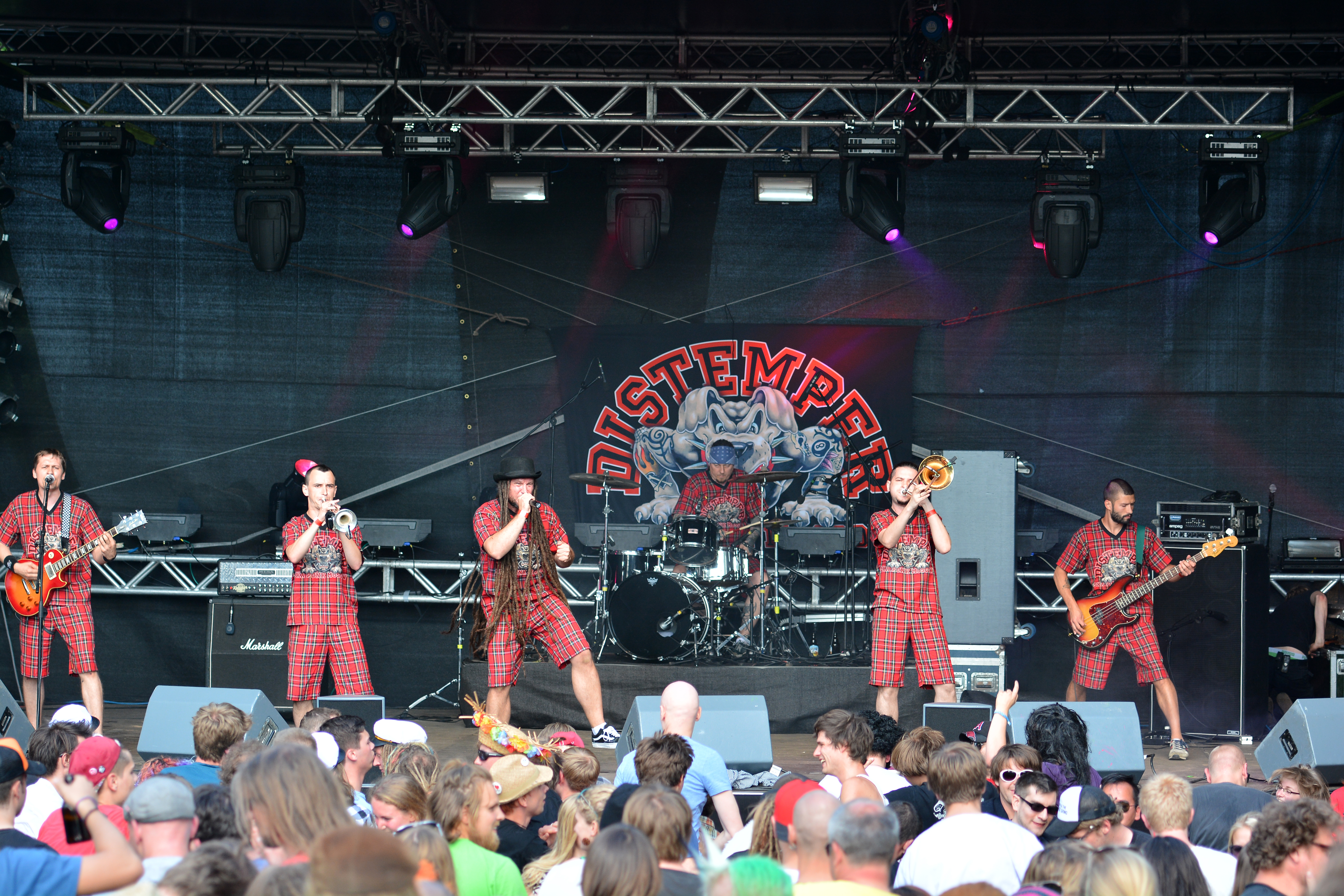
- Live performance in Germany 2014

Background information
- Origin: Moscow, Russia
- Genres: Hardcore punk (1989 — 1995); Skacore; Ska punk (1995 — present)
- Years active: 1989-present
- Members: Viacheslav "Dacent" Biryukov (Вячеслав "Дацент" Бирюков); Baj (Бай); Kostja (Костя); Alexey (Алексей); Wasja (Вася); Yury (Юра); Sergey (Сергей)
- Website: www.distemper.ru

Distemper is a Russian ska punk band from Moscow that was founded in 1989.

== History ==
Distemper was founded on 4 September 1989 in Moscow. They started out as a hardcore punk band and released their first record 2 years after the band was founded, still not very successful. In 1993 they released another album. With their 1995 record Город (City) they shifted to ska punk. They released 2 more albums.

== Music ==
Distemper's music can be characterized by upbeat ska-punk.

== Discography ==
- 1991: Мы сегодня с Баем (Today we're with Bai) (Sound Age Productions)
- 1993: Ой ду-ду (Oi du-du) (Hobgoblin Rec.)
- 1995: Город (City) (КТР Союз)
- 1997: Face Control (Hobgoblin Rec.)
- 1997: Внатуре! Алё!! Хорош!!! (Live) (Really! Hey!! Enough!!!) (Distemper Records)
- 1999: Ну всё!.. (That's enough!) (Sound Age Productions)
- 2000: Ска-панк шпионы (Ska-punk spies) (BRP Rec.)
- 2001: Доброе утро (Good morning) (BRP Rec. / Distemper Records)
- 2001: Hi! Good morning! (BRP Rec. / Distemper Records)
- 2003: Нам по... ! (We don't give a... !)(BRP Rec. / Distemper Records)
- 2003: Путеводитель по русскому року (The Russian rock guide) (BRP Rec.)
- 2003: Distemper + The Know How (Split)
- 2004: Ska Punk Moscow (BRP Rec.)
- 2005: Подумай, кто твои друзья (Think who're your friends)
- 2006: Distemper & Tarakany — Если парни объединятся ([what] If the guys unite)
- 2006: Ну Всё! (Переиздание 1999) (That's enough! 1999 reissue)
- 2007: Мир создан для тебя (The world's made for you)
- 2008: My Underground
- 2009: Всё или ничего (All or Nothing)
- 2013: Гордость, вера, любовь (Pride, Faith, Love)
- 2017: Мир, разделённый пополам (A world divided in half)
- 2021: Чистые души (Clean souls)
- 2022: Enceladus
