= Return of 13 Hedgehogs (MxBx Singles 2000–2009) =

Compilation album by Melt-Banana
- Released: May 12, 2015
- Recorded: 2001–2009
- Genre: Noise rock; punk rock
- Label: A-Zap

Melt-Banana chronology
Fetch (2013)	Return of 13 Hedgehogs (MxBx Singles 2000–2009) (2015)	3+5 (2024)

Professional ratings
Review scores
Source	Rating
AllMusic	4/5 stars

Return of 13 Hedgehogs (MxBx Singles 2000–2009) is a compilation album by Melt-Banana. The disc features 13 more singles, EPs and split records.

== Track listing ==
No.	Title	Length
1.	"Who Did It? Who Dig It?"	0:25
2.	"Dog in Lost"	1:27
3.	"2 Knees"	0:41
4.	"Puddle, Float"	0:46
5.	"Quite Free"	1:06
6.	"And I..."	1:41
7.	"Tintarella di luna"	2:04
8.	"Grave in the Hole (Pitfall Fits a Bit)"	2:30
9.	"Capital 1060 Hospital"	1:32
10.	"Too Rough to Scoop (Find a Grain of Greed)"	1:44
11.	"Creeps in a White Cake"	1:29
12.	"Monkey Man"	2:00
13.	"Operation: 3rd Attack"	0:41
14.	"Get the Head Back"	1:28
15.	"About"	0:58
16.	"Neck on B1"	0:44
17.	"Get the T (Escaping with the ID Card!)"	1:04
18.	"Steel Me Lust"	2:35
19.	"52 Hands, 36 Possibilities"	3:18
20.	"Sweeper"	3:39
21.	"Target Inside"	1:55
22.	"Cat in Red"	2:00
23.	"Snake Song"	1:48
24.	"Love Song"	1:42
25.	"Uncontrollable Urge"	3:00
26.	"Pain in Ash"	3:35
27.	"Loop Nebula"	2:37
28.	"Leeching"	1:18
29.	"Jack and a Red Dog"	1:36

== Track information ==
- Tracks 1–6 from split 8" EP w/ Three Studies for a Crucifixion (Passacaglia Records, 2001)
- Track 7 from split 7-inch EP w/ Dynamite Anna and the Bone Machine (Valium Records, 2001)
- Tracks 8–9 from split 7-inch EP w/ Daemien Frost (Alpha Relish, 2001)
- Tracks 10–11 from split 7-inch EP w/ The Locust (Gold Standard Laboratories, 2002)
- Tracks 12–13 from split 7-inch EP w/ Big D and the Kids Table (Fork in Hand Records, 2002)
- Tracks 14–16 from 666 6" EP (Level Plane Records, 2002)
- Tracks 17–18 from split 7-inch EP w/ Narcosis (SuperFi Records/Speedowax Records, 2004)
- Tracks 19–21 from Quick Slow Death split 10-inch EP w/ Chung (Sounds of Subterrania, 2005)
- Track 22 from split 5" EP w/ Fantômas (Unhip Records, 2005)
- Tracks 23–24 from 5" EP Ai No Uta (HG Fact, 2006)
- Track 25 from split Mini CD EP w/ Fat Day (Dark Beloved Cloud, 2007)
- Track 26 from split 7-inch EP w/ Young Widows (Temporary Residence Limited, 2009)
- Tracks 27–29 from Initial T. 7-inch EP (Init Records, 2009)
