= Hedgehog (hypergraph) =

Hedgehog for t = 5

In the mathematical theory of hypergraphs, a hedgehog is a 3-uniform hypergraph defined from an integer parameter $t$. It has $t+\tbinom{t}{2}$ vertices, $t$ of which can be labeled by the integers from $1$ to $t$ and the remaining $\tbinom{t}{2}$ of which can be labeled by unordered pairs of these integers. For each pair of integers $i,j$ in this range, it has a hyperedge whose vertices have the labels $i$, $j$, and $\{i,j\}$. Equivalently it can be formed from a complete graph by adding a new vertex to each edge of the complete graph, extending it to an order-3 hyperedge.

The properties of this hypergraph make it of interest in Ramsey theory.
