= Teeny Shiny =

Studio album by Melt-Banana
- Released: December 12, 2000
- Genre: Noise rock, punk rock
- Length: 30:20
- Label: A-Zap

Melt-Banana chronology
| MxBx 1998/13,000 Miles At Light Velocity (1999) | Teeny Shiny (2000) | Cell-Scape (2003) |

Teeny Shiny is the fifth album by Melt-Banana, released in 2000.

== Release ==
The album contains reworkings of two older songs. "First Contact to Planet Q", which was previously recorded as "Sham Bazar", and "Warp, Back Spin" which was previously recorded as "Crackhead Up or Down". Both of the songs have the same lyrics but are musically different. They appeared on the Japanese compilation CD Lo-Fi ~Electric Acoustic & Radical~, released in 1995.

At the beginning of "Free the Bee" there is a sped-up sample from the 1984 film Repo Man.

== Critical reception ==
Professional ratings
Review scores
| Source | Rating |
|---|---|
| AllMusic | 3/5 stars |
| The Encyclopedia of Popular Music | 3/5 stars |
| Pitchfork | 7.1/10 |

The Sunday Times deemed the album "reliably unhinged, old-school Japanese noise madness ... 11 collisions of electric-toothbrush guitars, police-siren solos, Gatling-gun drumming and kindergarten screeching." The Austin American-Statesman wrote that the band "adds a (very) slight pop edge to their usual chaos."

== Track listing ==
| No. | Title | Length |
|---|---|---|
| 1. | "Free the Bee" | 3:30 |
| 2. | "Flash Cube, or Eyeball" | 2:54 |
| 3. | "Lost in Mirror" | 2:34 |
| 4. | "First Contact to Planet Q" | 0:51 |
| 5. | "Warp, Back Spin" | 1:46 |
| 6. | "Third Attack" | 1:29 |
| 7. | "Cub, Not Cube" | 2:50 |
| 8. | "Flip and Hit" | 1:07 |
| 9. | "Bright Splat (Red Point, Black Dot)" | 2:30 |
| 10. | "Skit Closed, Windy..." | 1:02 |
| 11. | "Moon Flavor" (track ends at 3:16; hidden track "Key to Chase" begins at 8:16.) | 9:45 |
