= MxBx 1998/13,000 Miles at Light Velocity =

Live album by Melt-Banana
- Released: February 16, 1999
- Recorded: late 1998
- Genre: Noise rock
- Length: 39:20
- Label: Tzadik
- Producer: John Zorn

Melt-Banana chronology
| Charlie (1998) | MxBx 1998/13,000 Miles at Light Velocity (1999) | Teeny Shiny (2000) |

Professional ratings
Review scores
| Source | Rating |
|---|---|
| Allmusic | 3/5 stars |

MxBx 1998/13,000 Miles at Light Velocity is the first live album by Melt-Banana.

== Album ==
The album is not a conventional "live" album: it was not recorded at a concert, but live in the studio specially for John Zorn's Tzadik Records during the band's 1998 US tour. Many of the songs are being played in slightly different arrangements than the album versions. It is kind of a "best-of" release but with all the material re-recorded live in the studio. It also features their cover of The Beach Boys' "Surfin' U.S.A.".

The album features an untitled hidden track just a few seconds after "Plot in a Pot". This is a noisy instrumental jam with Smelly Mustafa, their tour manager at the time, announcing all of Melt-Banana's tour dates. The album begins in a similar way: before "Scratch Or Stitch", their roadie, Todd Nugent, says: "Yea looks like we're ready to go, yep here they come... yep here we go!" This part was recorded in the hallways at the University of Pittsburgh because Nugent was leaving the tour to begin touring with Fantômas.

The photos and artwork were made by Ikue Mori.

== Track listing ==
1. "Scratch or Stitch" – 1:34
2. "Rragg" – 0:54
3. "Wedge" – 1:08
4. "Seesaw Semiology" – 1:14
5. "Circle-Jack (Chase the Magic Words, Lego Lego)" – 2:11
6. "Sick Zip Everywhere" – 1:48
7. "Disposable Weathercock" – 1:49
8. "Mind Thief" – 1:36
9. "Blandished Hatman" – 1:06
10. "Iguana in Trouble" – 2:04
11. "Tapir's Flown Away" – 2:48
12. "His Name Is Mickey (At Last She Got Him...)" – 0:39
13. "We Love Choco-Pa!" – 0:18
14. "Some Kind of ID" – 0:14
15. "Stick Out" – 0:39
16. "Scrubber" – 0:22
17. "Screw, Loose" – 0:09
18. "First Defy" – 0:11
19. "So Unfilial Rule" – 0:09
20. "Spathic!!" – 2:42
21. "Picnic in Panic" – 2:11
22. "It's in the Pillcase" – 2:21
23. "Surfin' USA" – 2:34
24. "Bad Gut Missed First" – 1:42
25. "Ketchup-Mess" – 1:24
26. "Plot in a Pot" – 5:19
