= Charlie (Melt-Banana album) =

Studio album by Melt-Banana
- Released: October 27, 1998
- Genre: Noise rock; experimental rock; noise; grindcore
- Length: 35:36
- Label: A-Zap

Melt-Banana chronology
Scratch Or Stitch (1995)	Charlie (1998)	MxBx 1998/13,000 Miles at Light Velocity (1999)

Professional ratings
Review scores
Source	Rating
AllMusic	2.5/5 stars

Charlie is the fourth album by Melt-Banana. This album was the first release on their own label, A-Zap.

Charlie features guest appearances by Mike Patton and Mr. Bungle on the song "Area 877 [Phoenix Mix]". Mike Patton says: "MELT... BANANA!" at the beginning of the song and Melt-Banana have sampled this through many of their other songs including "7.2 Seconds Flipping", "Brick Again" and the version of "Bad Gut Missed Fist" on their live album MxBx 1998/13,000 Miles At Light Velocity.

Charlie was named after the film of the same name, based on the novel Flowers for Algernon.

== Track listing ==
No.	Title	Length
1.	"Introduction for Charlie"	3:10
2.	"Circle-Jack (Chase the Magic Words, Lego Lego)"	2:39
3.	"Spathic!!"	2:29
4.	"Tapir's Flown Away"	2:36
5.	"F.D.C. for Short"	1:23
6.	"Taen Taen Taen (?)"	0:44
7.	"Cannot"	2:50
8.	"Area 877 [Phoenix Mix]"	1:41
9.	"Giggle on the Stretcher"	0:49
10.	"Section Eight"	3:49
11.	"Drug Store"	1:56
12.	"Stimulus for Revolting Virus"	2:00
13.	"Excess"	1:42
14.	"Chipped Zoo on the Wall, Wastes in the Sky................"	7:48

There is also an untitled track hidden in the pregap before the first track, which is a cover of the song "Neat Neat Neat" by The Damned. It is 2 minutes and 14 seconds long followed by a minute of silence.
