= Scratch or Stitch =

Studio album by Melt-Banana
- Released: November 1995
- Recorded: July – August 1995
- Genre: Noise rock; noise; grindcore
- Length: 31:13
- Label: Meldac (Japan); Skin Graft (US)
- Producer: Steve Albini

Melt-Banana chronology
Cactuses Come in Flocks (1994)	Scratch or Stitch (1995)	Charlie (1998)

Professional ratings
Review scores
Source	Rating
AllMusic	4/5 stars
Pitchfork	8.2/10

Scratch or Stitch is the third album by Melt-Banana. This album was the first breakthrough for the band, as well as their first actual U.S. release.

== Release ==
LP versions of this album were limited to 2,600 copies, housed in rubber packaging with a poster lyric sheet and a special Melt-Banana temporary tattoo.

== Recording ==
The album was recorded in July–August 1995 by Steve Albini and mixed by Jim O'Rourke.

== US tour ==
The release of the album coincided with a US tour with Mr. Bungle. This helped establish Melt-Banana as one of the leading new Japanese punk rock bands. Melt-Banana have said in interviews how the audience would scream "We want to see Mr. Bungle", "Freebird" and "Go back to Japan", showing how unknown they were at that time.

== Songs ==
The track list is filled with Melt-Banana live favorites such as "Plot in a Pot", "Scratch or Stitch", "Sick Zip Everywhere", "It's in the Pillcase", "His Name is Mickey" and "Iguana in Trouble". A promotional video was made for "Sick Zip Everywhere".

== Rerelease ==
The album was rereleased in 2024 under the Skin Graft label.

== Track listing ==
No.	Title	Length
1.	"Plot in a Pot"	1:19
2.	"Scratch or Stitch"	1:02
3.	"Sick Zip Everywhere"	1:51
4.	"Disposable Weathercock"	1:43
5.	"Ten Dollars a Pile"	0:59
6.	"Ketchup-Mess"	1:27
7.	"Buzzer #P"	1:46
8.	"Rough Dogs Have Bumps"	1:49
9.	"Iguana in Trouble"	2:21
10.	"It's in the Pillcase"	1:30
11.	"Test: Ground 1"	0:30
12.	"Zoo, No Vacancy"	0:15
13.	"A Finger to Hackle"	0:22
14.	"Type B for Me"	0:09
15.	"His Name Is Mickey (At Last She Got Him...)"	0:21
16.	"Back to the Womb"	2:46
17.	"I Hate It"	0:58
18.	"What Do You Slaughter Next?"	1:42
19.	"Eye-Q Trader"	1:48
20.	"Dig Out!"	2:23
21.	"Contortion Out of Confusion"	1:39
22.	"Pigeon on My Eyes (Go to Bed!!!)"	2:33
