= Speak Squeak Creak =

Studio album by Melt-Banana
- Released: September 25, 1994 (CD); April 2001 (CD, LP)
- Recorded: June 1994
- Genre: No wave, speed metal
- Length: 32:08
- Label: NUX Organization (Japan); A-Zap (U.S., Japan)
- Producer: KK Null

Melt-Banana chronology
Speak Squeak Creak (1994)	Cactuses Come In Flocks (1994)

Speak Squeak Creak is the first album by Melt-Banana. It was first released in September 1994 by NUX Organization and re-issued by A-Zap in April 2001.

Speak Squeak Creak was recorded by Steve Albini in a basement in Chicago in June/July 1994. It was produced by KK Null.

The last untitled track is simply all 24 songs played at the same time.

== Track listing ==
No.	Title	Length
1.	"Tail in Garbage (Tekepake)"	1:16
2.	"Rragg"	0:57
3.	"In x Out = Bug"	1:21
4.	"Scrubber"	0:16
5.	"So Unfilial Rule"	0:11
6.	"Dust Head"	1:11
7.	"A Teaspoon of Salt"	0:38
8.	"Stick Out"	0:42
9.	"Mouse Is a Biscuit"	1:05
10.	"55 Hands Need to Cut Down"	1:29
11.	"P-Pop-Slop"	1:25
12.	"Smell the Medicine"	2:31
13.	"Switch"	2:18
14.	"P.B.D."	1:43
15.	"Mind Thief"	1:38
16.	"Chicken Headed Raccoon Dog"	1:47
17.	"Cry for More Fish"	0:18
18.	"Screw, Loose"	0:10
19.	"Cook Cool Kyau Kuru"	1:14
20.	"Scissor Quiz"	1:33
21.	"Too Many to Dispose"	0:28
22.	"Blandished Hatman"	1:15
23.	"Cut Off"	2:01
24.	"Pierced Eye"	2:06
25.	"(untitled)"	2:35
