= 3+5 =

Studio album by Melt-Banana
- Released: August 23, 2024
- Genres: Noise rock; experimental rock; hardcore punk
- Length: 24:20
- Label: A-ZAP
- Producer: Melt-Banana

Melt-Banana chronology
Return of 13 Hedgehogs (2015)	3+5 (2024)

3+5 is the ninth album by the Japanese noise rock band Melt-Banana. It was released on August 23, 2024, on CD, LP and digitally.

== Background ==
3+5 is Melt-Banana's first studio album in 11 years.

Professional ratings
Aggregate scores
Source	Rating
Metacritic	88/100
Review scores
Source	Rating
Spin	A
The Quietus	Positive
The Skinny	5/5 stars

== Track listing ==
No.	Title	Length
1.	"Code"	3:19
2.	"Puzzle"	3:01
3.	"Case D"	2:34
4.	"Stopgap"	2:20
5.	"Scar"	3:27
6.	"Flipside"	1:56
7.	"Hex"	2:35
8.	"Whisper"	2:27
9.	"Seeds"	2:34

== Charts ==
3+5 entered the following charts, peaking at the number specified for each: UK Record Store Chart (#38), UK Independent Albums Chart (#47), and UK Independent Album Breakers Chart (#11).
