= Cactuses Come in Flocks =

Cactuses Come In Flocks

Studio album by Melt-Banana
- Released: September 1994
- Recorded: November 1992, November 1993 – June 1994
- Genre: Noise rock, punk rock
- Length: 28:16
- Label: Chocolate Monk (UK); A-Zap (U.S., Japan)

Melt-Banana chronology
Speak Squeak Creak (1994)	Cactuses Come In Flocks (1994)	Scratch Or Stitch (1995)

Professional ratings
Review scores
Source	Rating
Allmusic	3/5 stars

Cactuses Come In Flocks is the second album by Melt-Banana. Although it is their second full-length release, the band refers to it as their "1&½nd album". The album was originally released on cassette by Chocolate Monk and was later re-issued to CD and LP by A-Zap.

Cactuses Come in Flocks contains an early live performance in November 1992 at an improvisation festival at the Tokyo University of Foreign Studies. None of these songs ever made it to any studio recording although the song "To the Core" has the same lyrics as "Chicken Headed Raccoon Dog" on their debut album Speak Squeak Creak.

The other half of the album is a studio session from July 1994 soon after the recording of the first album. These songs were recorded specially for this release. The sound is some of the rawest of Melt-Banana. This recording also marks the debut of Melt-Banana regulars "Ketchup-Mess" (in a much slower version) and "Picnic in Panic" (in a much faster version).

The CD/LP re-issue also contains a song not featured on the original cassette called "Interval". This song was usually played on tape at the beginning of almost all their shows during the 94-95 period.

On the original cassette release the 15 studio songs were on side A and the 16 live songs were on side B. The re-issue has them switched with "Interval" in the middle.

== Track listing (Re-issue CD/LP version) ==
1. "Just Grub & Run" – 0:53
2. "Talk Like Pop" – 0:51
3. "Shining Hatcher" – 0:46
4. "F. Part One" – 0:40
5. "To the Core" – 0:40
6. "F. Part Two" – 1:09
7. "Shuuuuuuuuuuuuuuuuu" – 0:29
8. "Bunny Wasted a Month Waiting" – 1:14
9. "Party-Hat" – 0:47
10. "Shouting About Love" – 0:27
11. "Sonic Turtle" – 0:45
12. "Bored Elephant" – 1:43
13. "Up & Down 1, 2, 3..." – 1:21
14. "1 to 11" – 0:56
15. "Dried Up Water-Park" – 1:14
16. "How to Say 'Rip Them Off', Repeat After Me" – 0:29
17. "Interval........." – 3:00
18. "Locoweed In the Bottle" – 0:22
19. "Ketchup-Mess" – 1:21
20. "We Love Choco-Pa" – 0:14
21. "No Way to Hear" – 0:11
22. "We Had Tails In the Old Days" – 0:53
23. "So Far So Bad So What?" – 0:27
24. "Frog Swims the River Down Giggling" – 1:07
25. "I Hate It! [long version]" – 1:38
26. "Who Cares?" – 0:21
27. "FMFYYD" – 0:06
28. "Pie War" – 0:48
29. "Ants Living In a Narrow Box" – 0:49
30. "Clayfish Song" – 0:29
31. "6 Feet Long For Her Neck" – 0:17
32. "Picnic With Panic [long version]" – 1:49
- Tracks 1–16 were recorded live at the Tokyo Improvisation Festival in November, 1992.

== Track listing (Original cassette version) ==
Side A.

1. "Locoweed In the Bottle" – 0:22
2. "Ketchup-Mess" – 1:21
3. "We Love Choco-Pa" – 0:14
4. "No Way to Hear" – 0:11
5. "We Had Tails In the Old Days" – 0:53
6. "So Far So Bad So What?" – 0:27
7. "Flog Swims the River Down" – 1:07
8. "I Hate It! [long version]" – 1:38
9. "Who Cares?" – 0:21
10. "FMFYYD" – 0:06
11. "Pie War" – 0:48
12. "Ants Living In a Narrow Box" – 0:49
13. "Clayfish Song" – 0:26
14. "6 Feet Long For Her Neck" – 0:17
15. "Picnic With Panic [long version]" – 1:49

Side B.

1. "Just Grub & Run" – 0:53
2. "Talk Like Pop" – 0:51
3. "Shining Hatcher" – 0:46
4. "F. Part One" – 0:40
5. "To the Core" – 0:40
6. "Shuuuuuuuuuuuuuuuuu" – 0:29
7. "F. Part Two" – 1:09
8. "Bunny Wasted a Month Waiting" – 1:14
9. "Party-Hat" – 0:47
10. "Shouting About Love" – 0:27
11. "Sonic Turtle" – 0:45
12. "Bored Elephant" – 1:43
13. "Up & Down 1, 2, 3..." – 1:21
14. "1 to 11" – 0:56
15. "Dried Up Water-Park" – 1:14
16. "How to Say 'Rip Them Off', Repeat After Me" – 0:29
