= Bambi's Dilemma =

Studio album by Melt-Banana
- Released: April 24, 2007
- Genres: Hardcore punk, noise rock
- Length: 34:57
- Label: A-Zap

Melt-Banana chronology
13 Hedgehogs (2005)	Bambi's Dilemma (2007)	Melt-Banana Lite Live Ver 0.0 (2009)

Professional ratings
Review scores
Source	Rating
AllMusic	3.5/5 stars
Drowned in Sound	(8/10)

Bambi's Dilemma is the seventh studio album by Melt-Banana, released on April 24, 2007. It was released on CD and vinyl. The album's title came from an incident which happened when vocalist Yasuko was driving the band's touring van in the US and hit a deer, and kept thinking about the character Bambi from the film of the same name.

== Track listing ==
No.	Title	Length
1.	"Spider Snipe"	2:12
2.	"Blank Page of the Blind"	2:18
3.	"Cracked Plaster Cast"	2:13
4.	"Heiwaboke Crisis"	1:36
5.	"Cat Brain Land"	2:11
6.	"Plasma Gate Quest"	1:41
7.	"Type: Ecco System"	3:58
8.	"The Call of the Vague"	2:04
9.	"Green Eyed Devil"	2:24
10.	"Crow's Paint Brush (Color Repair)"	2:39
11.	"T For Tone"	0:32
12.	"Slide Down"	0:49
13.	"Lock the Head"	0:44
14.	"One Drop, One Life"	0:55
15.	"In Store"	0:56
16.	"Dog Song"	1:20
17.	"Chain Keeper"	1:22
18.	"Last Target on the Last Day"	5:03

== Cultural references ==
- Song named "Type: Ecco System" is a reference to the Ecco the Dolphin video game.

== Audio samples ==
Thirty-second audio samples can be found here on AllMusic.
