= Ichiro Agata =

Guitarist

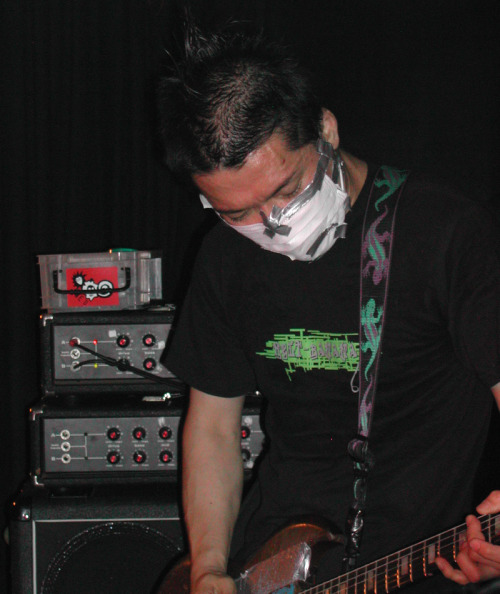
- Ichiro Agata live (2005) in a surgical mask

Background information
- Origin: Japan
- Genres: Noise Rock; Experimental rock Avant-Garde
- Occupation: guitarist
- Instrument: Gibson SG Guitar
- Years active: 1992–present
- Labels: A-Zap, Tzadik Records
- Member of: Melt-Banana

Ichiro Agata (縣 一郎, Agata Ichirō) is the guitarist for the Japanese noise rock band Melt-Banana. Agata is known particularly for his furious stage antics, jumping and constantly moving around, and exceedingly unique approach to playing the guitar which involves extended technique, heavy use of effects pedals, and guitar slides resulting in sounds not easily attributed to the guitar.

Agata is known for consistently wearing a surgical mask on stage during performances and in promotional photos, which has been attributed to a "blood condition" or a "bone disease" that can cause sudden nose bleeds, with the mask hiding the tissues used to stem the blood. He started wearing it in "1995 or 1996" when touring with Mr. Bungle. However, he has also said that his condition is not a major concern any longer and that he wears it for fun.

He has also released a solo guitar album, entitled Spike, on John Zorn's Tzadik Records.

Agata often gets inspiration for his guitar riffs from his experience playing video games: "If I get excited about a clever move I’ve made in the game then I might try to interpret that move musically. It’s hard to explain. But if I’m killing a lot of people in a game and there’s a quiet soundtrack to it I might then go to the studio and think of that game and make a noisy blast-beat song and add some quiet pretty sounds to it." Games he has cited as an inspiration include Tony Hawk's Pro Skater 3, Ecco the Dolphin, Demon's Souls and Shadow of the Colossus.

== Discography ==
- Spike (2004)
