= Black Obelisk (band) =

Russian heavy metal band

Чёрный Обелиск Black Obelisk
- Origin: Moscow, Russia
- Genres: Heavy metal; thrash metal; hard rock; progressive metal
- Years active: 1986–1988, 1990–1997, 1999–present
- Members: Dmitry Borisenkov; Mikhail Svetlov; Daniil Zaharenkov; Maxim Oleynik
- Past members: Anatoly Krupnov; Yuri Alexeyev; Vladimir Yermakov

Black Obelisk (Russian: Чёрный Обелиск, Chorny Obelisk) is a Russian heavy metal band founded in 1986 by bassist Anatoly Krupnov, who died in 1997. Different works and eras of band wavered their style between hard rock and thrash metal.

== History ==
The original lineup consisted of Anatoly Krupnov (bass, vocals), Yuri Anisimov (guitar) Mikhail Svetlov (guitar), and Nikolay Agafoshkin (drums). After their first performance, they joined Moscow Rock-Lab. Svetlov was soon replaced with Yuri Alexeyev. With Alexeyev, the band released the tape album Apocalypsis (1987). Svetlov rejoined ChO next year, replacing Anisimov, and participated in the following album Tsveti Zla (Flowers of Evil). The second album was more successful, and the band's popularity grew. Black Obelisk participated in the Moskovskij Komsomolets' yearly festival "Sound Track". But the continual alcohol abuse of Krupnov led the band to collapse in 1988, after a fighting incident in Chişinău.

Black Obelisk reunited on 1 August 1990. The experienced Sergey Komarov became the new drummer, and Svetlov was soon replaced by Vasily Biloshitsky. But the recording of new album was suddenly halted after Komarov was shot to death by criminals. With Vladimir Yermakov as drummer, band recorded its third LP Stena (the Wall), and toured in support of it.

Next year the album One More Day with English lyrics came out. The Russian version of the album was released in 1992, following many lineup changes: Biloshitsky was replaced by Zhirnov, and then by Dmitry Borisenkov. Black Obelisk toured together with Sepultura and Master. 1994's album Ya Ostayus (I Will Stay) was the last album featuring the classic lineup. Krupnov's alcohol and drug addiction again triggered a crisis within the band. In 1996 Alexeyev left to E.S.T., and then Black Obelisk went on hiatus. Krupnov tried to reunite the band once again, but died on 27 February 1997 in the studio from a heroin overdose, during the record session.

Black Obelisk resumed activity in 1999, when Borisenkov, Yermakov and Svetlov reunited under the old name. Borisenkov became the vocalist and main songwriter. Daniil Zakharenkov became the band's new bass player. In 2000 the album, the recording of which was started back in 1996, was completed and released to public under the name Postalbum.

Black Obelisk remain active, though a new lineup led to stylistic changes and less "anarchistic" lyrics in following albums Pepel (Ashes), Nervi (Nerves) and Zeleny Albom (Green Album), written by Borisenkov. Dmitry also participated in the Elven Manuscript metal opera by Epidemia in the role of Deimos the dark lord.

In 2009, they released Черное Белое (Black & White) an internet-single. They also put the songs "Черное-Белое" (Black & White), "Вальс" (Waltz), "Исход" (Exodus), and "Прощай и прости" (Farewell & Forgive) for free download on their official website.

== Discography ==
=== Studio ===
- «Апокалипсис» (Apocalypse, 1986)
- «Цветы Зла» (Flowers of Evil, 1987)
- «Стена» (The Wall, 1991)
- One More Day (1991)
- «Ещё один день» (One More Day, Russian version, 1992)
- «Я остаюсь» (I Will Stay, 1994)
- «1986 – 1988» (1995)
- «Пепел» (Ashes, 2002)
- «Нервы» (Nerves, 2004)
- «Зелёный альбом» (Green Album, 2006)
- «Мёртвый сезон» (Off-season, 2012)
- «Мой мир» (My World, 2013)
- «Революция» (Revolution, 2015).
- «Акустика?» (Acoustics? 2017)
- «Х» (2018)
- «Disco 2020» (2019)

=== Live ===
- «Память о прошлом. Часть I» (The Memory of the Past. Part I, recorded 1987, 1988/released 1993)
- «Память о прошлом. Часть II» (The Memory of the Past. Part II, recorded 1990, 1992, 1993/released 1994)
- «Последний концерт в Кишиневе» (The last live in Chişinău, 1988)
- «Пятница 13» (Friday, 13th, recorded 1992/released 2004)
- «Апокалипсис Live» (Apocalypse Live, recorded 1986–1988/released 2006)

=== Singles ===
- «Жизнь после смерти» (Life After Death, 1990)
- «Песни для радио» (Songs for Radio, 2000)
- «Ангелы» (Angels, 2005)
- «Когда-нибудь» (Someday, 2006)
- «Чёрное / Белое» (Black / White, 2009)
- «Вверх» (Up, 2013)
- «Марш революции» (March of Revolution, 2014)
- «Душа» (Soul, 2014)
- «Ира» (Ira, 2016)
- «Не имеет значения» (No Matter, 2016)
- «Осень» (Autumn, 2016)
- «Осколки» (Pieces, 2017)
- «Tени» (Shadows, 2020)

=== Video ===
- «Концерт в СDК МАИ» (Live in CDK MAI, 2005)
- «20 и еще один день» (20 years and one more day, recorded 1992–1993/released 2006)
- «Концерт в Днепропетровске (интернет релиз)» (Live in Dnipropetrovsk (internet release), 2010)
- «9000 дней (интернет релиз)» (9000 days (internet release), TBA)

== Members ==
Current:

- Dmitry Borisenkov – lead vocals, guitar (1992–1995, 1999–present)
- Mikhail Svetlov – guitar (1986, 1987–1988, 1990, 1999–present)
- Daniil Zaharenkov – bass, backing vocals (1999–present)
- Maxim Oleynik – drums (2011–present)

Former:

- Anatoly Krupnov – vocals, bass (1986–1988, 1990–1997) – died in 1997
- Yuri Anisimov – guitar (1986–1987)
- Nikolay Agafoshkin – drums (1986–1988)
- Yuri Alexeyev – guitar (1986–1988, 1990–1995, 1999–2000)
- Sergey Komarov – drums (1990) – died in 1990
- Vasily Biloshitsky – guitar (1990–1992)
- Igor Zhirnov – guitar (1992)
- Vladimir Ermakoff – drums (1990–1995, 1999–2011)
