= Assfort =

Japanese hardcore punk band from Tokyo

Assfort is a Japanese hardcore punk band from Tokyo. Their musical style is fast and loud with angry, fast, undecipherable vocals.

Their style follows in the vein of old school 1980's Japanese hardcore punk music, such as The Stalin and Gauze.

== Members ==
Yoshio - vocals
Hiya - guitar
Shimomura - bass
Kiku - drums / No Think, CHARM, Conquest For Death, Sow Threat, R.A.G.S on Bass

== Discography ==
- Five Knuckle Shuffle (album) (1991)
- The Unlimited Variety of Noises (1992)
- Ejacolation (1995)
- Bark Up The Wrong Tree (1996)
- P.K.O. (1996)
