= Cell-Scape =

- The creature on the cover is a Clione.

Studio album by Melt-Banana
- Released: July 1, 2003
- Recorded: February 2 – March 3, 2003
- Genres: Noise rock; experimental rock; noise
- Length: 37:09
- Label: A-Zap
- Producer: Melt-Banana

Melt-Banana chronology
Teeny Shiny (2000)	Cell-Scape (2003)	13 Hedgehogs (2005)

Professional ratings
Review scores
Source	Rating
Pitchfork	(7.5/10)
Tiny Mix Tapes	4/5 stars

Cell-Scape is the sixth album by Melt-Banana. It features electronic elements and marks a musical shift to a more accessible, hi-fi sound.

Cell-Scape also features some of the longest songs written by Melt-Banana, including "Shield for Your Eyes" at 4 minutes long. Yasuko sings with her "real" voice in the chorus of "If it is the Deep Sea, I Can See You There". The last track on the album is uncharacteristic of Melt Banana's typical musical style; it is a 10-minute-long electronic ambient song.

The song "Chain-Shot to Have Some Fun" was featured in an animated short movie called "Emily and the Baba Yaga".

There was no drummer on this album, and all the drums were programmed on a drum machine. Some of the patterns, however, were inspired by Dave Witte's drumming. There is also some debate about whether some of the drumming was performed by Dave Witte.

== Track listing ==
All tracks by Melt-Banana

No.	Title	Length
1.	"Phantasmagoria"	1:29
2.	"Shield for Your Eyes, a Beast in the Well on Your Hand"	4:02
3.	"A Dreamer Who Is Too Weak to Face Up To"	3:02
4.	"Lost Parts Stinging Me So Cold"	3:10
5.	"Chain-Shot to Have Some Fun"	3:13
6.	"Like a White Bat in a Box, Dead Matters Go On"	3:33
7.	"Key Is a Fact That a Cat Brings"	2:23
8.	"A Hunter in the Rain to Cut the Neck Up in the Present Stage"	2:33
9.	"If it Is the Deep Sea, I Can See You There"	3:29
10.	"Outro for Cell-Scape"	10:11
