= Melt-Banana =

Japanese noise rock band

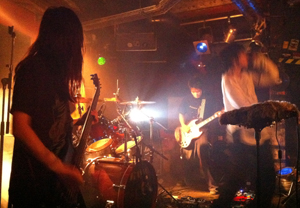
- Melt-Banana in 2010

Background information
- Origin: Tokyo, Japan
- Genres: Noise rock; experimental rock; hardcore punk; electronic rock; progressive rock; noise pop
- Years active: 1992–present
- Labels: A-Zap; Gold Standard Labs; Skin Graft
- Members: Yasuko Onuki; Ichiro Agata
- Past members: Sudoh Toshiaki; Oshima Watchma; Rika Hamamoto
- Website: melt-banana.net

Melt-Banana is a Japanese noise rock band that is known for playing extremely fast noise rock and hardcore punk mixed with experimental, electronica and pop-based song structures. Since forming in 1992 the band has released ten albums and toured worldwide extensively.

== History ==
In 1991, while attending Tokyo University of Foreign Studies, Yasuko Onuki started a band called Mizu and, after a short period rehearsing with another guitarist, recruited Ichiro Agata to play guitar in the band. Mizu's original drummer and bass player quit six months after Agata joined, leaving Yasuko to play bass and sing until she found bassist Rika Hamamoto. They briefly performed shows around Tokyo without a drummer. Sudoh Toshiaki then joined as the new drummer in November 1992, and they changed their name to Melt-Banana.

In May 1993, Melt-Banana played a show opening for KK Null of Zeni Geva fame, who was impressed enough to immediately offer them a deal with his label, and would later introduce them to Mark Fischer of Skin Graft Records and Steve Albini.

In 1996, Sick Zip Everywhere was nominated for MTV UK's best video. In the same year the band completed their first European tour.

In 1997, they created their own recording company, A-Zap (formerly Iguana Coax), and re-issued most of their early albums. Around this time, drummer Sudoh Toshiaki quit. Oshima Watchma became the new official drummer in February 1998.

The band recorded its first Peel Session in September 1999. Onuki thought John Peel looked like Santa Claus; Agata has said that when finishing a new song, he still thinks of Peel and what he would think of it if he listened. Peel described the session as "Simply one of the most extraordinary performances I have ever seen and ever heard ... just mesmerizing, absolutely astonishing." The broadcast exposed the band to new audiences in the United Kingdom and beyond.

Watchma left the band in 2000, and since then the band has had different drummers on their tours and albums.

In 2007, Melt-Banana recorded the song "Hair-Cat (Cause the Wolf Is a Cat!)" for Perfect Hair Forever on Cartoon Network's Adult Swim lineup.

The studio album Fetch, released September 2013, saw the band transition to a duo. The decision not to use a live drummer led on to the decision not to have a live bass player. Using a computer for the rhythm allowed more freedom in the arrangement. Hamamoto's help was not needed for the new duo format. Additionally, throughout the band's career Agata and Onuki had been the main songwriters.

In late 2019, during an interview conducted on tour, with Louder magazine, the band stated they would record a new album. A new studio album titled "3+5" was announced on May 23, 2024 and released on August 23, 2024.

== Style ==
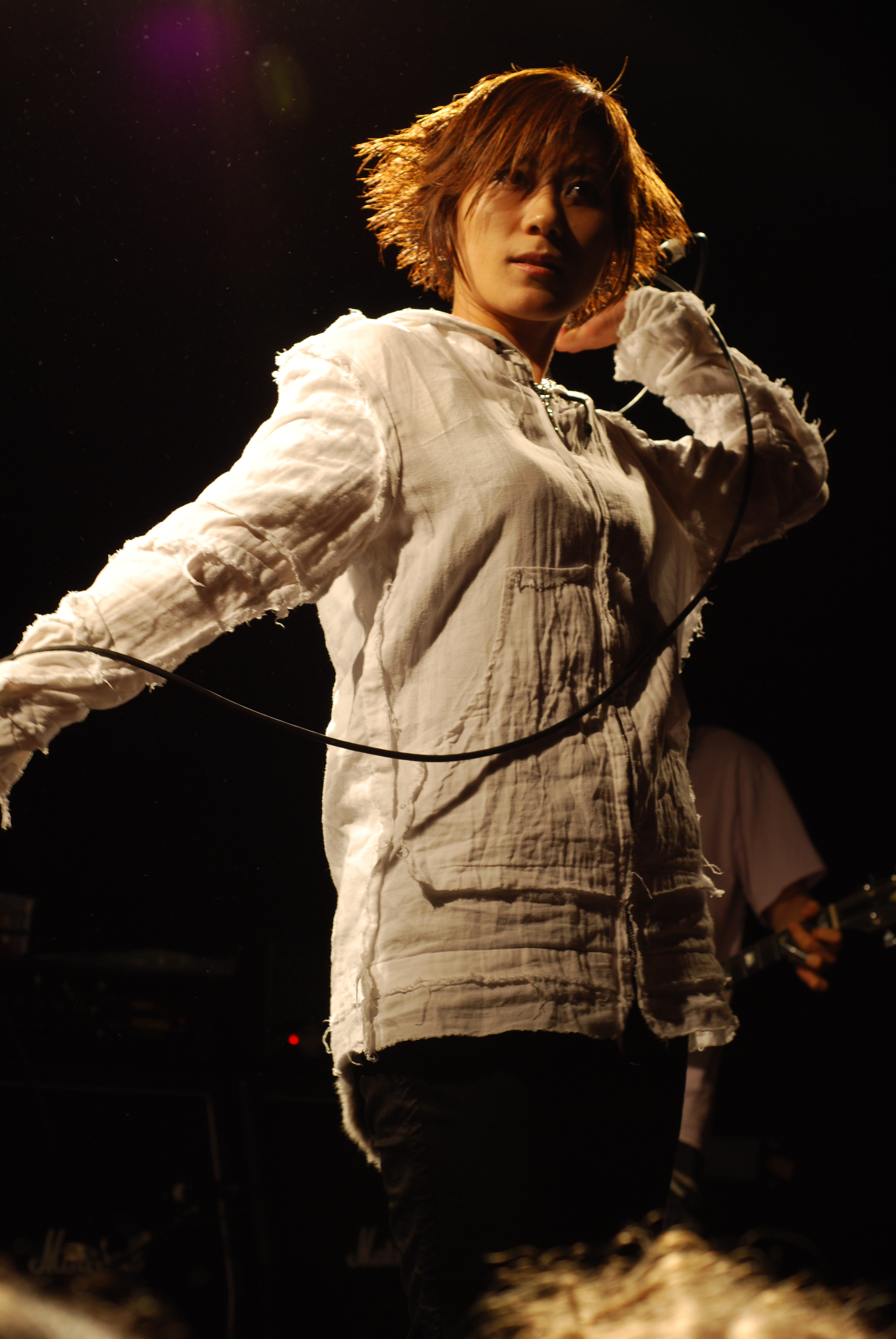
Yasuko Onuki

Melt-Banana's music is typically described as noise rock, with roots in punk, electro-pop and electronic music. The band has shied away from any classification, saying they "don't write music according to genre", and has described their music as "like a chimera". Melt-Banana has cited The Sex Pistols, Einstürzende Neubauten, Masonna, Violent Onsen Geisha, Aphex Twin and Atari Teenage Riot as influences, as well as the compilation album No New York. Agata also gets inspiration from the feelings of excitement, triumph and peril he experiences when playing video games, and interpreting that musically. He believes that influences from outside music, including video games, help them see from fresh angles and keep them from writing "the same kind of music again and again". Games he has cited as an inspiration include Tony Hawk's Pro Skater 3, Ecco the Dolphin, Demon's Souls and Shadow of the Colossus.

Onuki's distinctive vocal style has been described as "loud, piercing and unexpectedly authoritative". Asked about her influences, Onuki explained: "there is no tradition and no influence besides maybe Lydia Lunch and the Teenage Jerks. She opened a new book for me. It was so unique and distinctive, you could tell by listening to the voice who is singing – that what I wanted to achieve with my own voice too."

Although the band is Japanese, their lyrics are written in English. Onuki originally sung in Japanese, but quickly changed to English, believing that it was better suited to her style of singing. Because English is not her native language, Onuki often has to look words up in dictionaries, which also allows her to find words that sound interesting to her. In writing a song, Onuki typically starts with particular words and then works backwards, the content of which comes from what she "see[s] and feel[s] in [her] usual life".

Guitarist Agata is noted for his distinct playing style that employs heavy use of effects and pedals.

Melt-Banana is also noted for an "eclectic" selection of cover songs, both live and on studio recordings. Melt-Banana was inspired to do so after touring with Mr. Bungle and seeing them perform several cover songs, and thinking it would be fun for both the audience and the band themselves. Songs that Melt-Banana has covered include "Surfin' U.S.A." (The Beach Boys), "Neat Neat Neat" (The Damned) and "Paint It Black" (The Rolling Stones). In choosing the songs, Melt-Banana simply "play songs that [they] like."

== Members ==
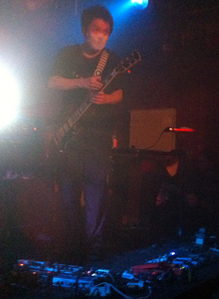
Ichiro Agata

- Yasuko Onuki – vocals (1992–present)
- Ichiro Agata – guitars, effects (1992–present)

=== Former members ===
==== Bass ====
From 2013 onward the band does not have a bass player.

- Rika Hamamoto (1992–2013)

==== Drums ====
Melt-Banana does not currently have an official drummer. From 2013 onward the band does not have a drummer when playing live. There have been two drummers who were official members; Sudoh Toshiaki and Oshima Watchma. A number of guest drummers have been used for studio recordings and live performances.

- Sudoh Toshiaki (Machine and the Synergetic Nuts) (1992 to December 1997). Appears on Speak Squeak Creak, Cactuses Come in Flocks, and Scratch or Stitch.
- Kiku (ex-Assfort) – guest live drummer, one show, early 1998.
- Youichiro Natsume (ex-Multiplex, ex-Force) – guest studio drummer, early 1998. Appears on Charlie.
- Masaki Oshima (WATCHMAN) (Coaltar of the Deepers, ex-Satanic Hell Slaughter) (February 1998 to 2000). Toured, and appears on MxBx 1998/13,000 Miles at Light Velocity and Teeny Shiny.
- Dave Witte (Municipal Waste, ex-Discordance Axis) – guest touring drummer, US and Europe only, 2001 to 2005.
- Obokata – guest live drummer, Japan only.
- Masashi Sakata (324) – guest live drummer, Japan and ATP UK 2002.
- Takiya Terada – guest live drummer in 2002, 2010–2012.
- Eiji Uki (ex-Acid Mothers Temple, ex-Monghang) – Guest live drummer, Japan and 2007 US tours and 2008 Europe tour.
- Yasuhiro Inomata – guest live drummer in 2009.

== Touring and collaborations ==
The band have carried out lengthy US and UK tours yearly and smaller Japanese tours (the reason for this, according to them, is that travelling in Japan is quite expensive). Melt-Banana have worked with a diverse range of artists, including Merzbow, John Zorn, Agathe Max, Mike Patton, and Discordance Axis. Melt-Banana has toured as an opening act with high-profile bands such as:

- Jim O'Rourke and Zeni Geva (1994, Japan)
- Mr. Bungle (1995, US)
- Melvins (1999, Japan and US)
- Fantômas (2004, US)
- Tool (2007, US)
- Metal Machine Trio (2010, Australia)
- Napalm Death and Melvins (2016, US)
- Igorrr and Otto von Schirach (2023, US)

== Discography ==
Studio albums

- Speak Squeak Creak (1994)
- Cactuses Come in Flocks (1994)
- Scratch or Stitch (1995)
- Charlie (1998)
- Teeny Shiny (2000)
- Cell-Scape (2003)
- Bambi's Dilemma (2007)
- Fetch (2013)
- 3+5 (2024)
