= Trampthology =

Compilation album by Mike Tramp
- Released: December 18, 2020
- Recorded: 1995–2020
- Genre: Soft rock; melodic rock
- Label: Target

Mike Tramp chronology
Second Time Around (2020)	Trampthology (2020)	Songs of White Lion (2023-2025)

Singles from Trampthology
- 1. "Take Me Away" Released: 2020; 2. "Everything Is Alright" Released: 2021

Trampthology is the first greatest hits album by former White Lion and Freak of Nature lead singer Mike Tramp, released on December 18, 2020, through Mighty Music/Target Records. The album was released to celebrate Tramp's 25th anniversary as a solo artist.

== Background and recording ==
The compilation features sixteen of Tramp's biggest hits from his solo career plus four new songs. Tracks from every Mike Tramp solo album are included except the leftover album Songs I Left Behind and the two Mike Tramp & The Rock 'N' Roll Circuz albums: The Rock 'N' Roll Circuz and Stand Your Ground, although the song "The Road" was originally recorded on The Rock 'N' Roll Circuz album, it was later re-recorded for the album Second Time Around.

== Release and promotion ==
The album was released on double gatefold 180-gram vinyl and double CD. One of the four new songs, "Take Me Away", was released as a single in advance and was promoted with a lyric video.

The album charted at number 17 on the Danish Hitlisten albums chart.

== Track listing ==
Trampthology track listing
No.	Title	From album	Length
1.	"Give It All You Got"	Nomad
2.	"If I Live Tomorrow"	Capricorn
3.	"More to Life Than This"	More to Life Than This
4.	"The Road"	Second Time Around
5.	"Ain't Done Yet"	New song
6.	"Dead End Ride"	Stray from the Flock
7.	"Maybe Tomorrow"	Maybe Tomorrow
8.	"Mr. Death"	Recovering the Wasted Years
9.	"Mother"	Museum
10.	"Take Me Away"	New song
11.	"Cobblestone Street"	Cobblestone Street
12.	"Trust in Yourself"	Museum
13.	"New Day"	Cobblestone Street
14.	"Bow and Obey"	Nomad
15.	"Every Time"	New song
16.	"Coming Home"	Maybe Tomorrow
17.	"Lay Down My Life for You"	More to Life Than This
18.	"Better Off"	Capricorn
19.	"The Way It Was Before"	Stray from the Flock
20.	"I'll Never Be Young Again"	New song

== Everything Is Alright ==
Everything Is Alright is the single disc shorter version (10 tracks) of Trampthology released in May 2021. The new compilation album features 9 of the 16 hits from Trampthology, plus one new single "Everything Is Alright". The title track was officially released as a single in February 2021, as Tramp's entry into the Eurovision Song Contest representing Denmark. The song is up against seven other entries, and the winner will be chosen at the Dansk Melodi Grand Prix on March 6. The Eurovision Song Contest finals will take place in Rotterdam, Netherlands in May which will coincide with Tramp's new compilation album. Tramp also released the official music video for "Everything Is Alright" on February 18, 2021.

=== Track listing ===
No.	Title	From album	Length
1.	"Give It All You Got"	Nomad
2.	"Trust in Yourself"	Museum
3.	"If I Live Tomorrow"	Capricorn
4.	"Cobblestone Street"	Cobblestone Street
5.	"Coming Home"	Maybe Tomorrow
6.	"Everything Is Alright"	New song
7.	"Dead End Ride"	Stray from the Flock
8.	"Take Me Away"	Trampthology
9.	"The Road"	Second Time Around
10.	"More to Life Than This"	More to Life Than This

== Personnel ==
New tracks

- Mike Tramp – vocal, electric and acoustic guitar, piano
- Oliver Steffensen – guitar
- Marcus Nand – additional guitar
- Claus Langeskov – bass
- Kenni Andy – drums
- Emily Garriock Langeskov – backing vocals

Additional personnel

- Guitar: Soren Anderson, Kasper Damgaard, Todd Wolfe, Henrik Berger
- Bass: Jerry Best, Jesper Haugaard, Nicholas Findsen, Emil Bendixen
- Drums: Morten Hellborn, Kasper Foss, Dorian Crozier
- Rhythm guitar: Kenny Korade
- Keyboards: Morten Buchholz
- Hammond B-3: Dan Hemmer, Kim Bullard
- Backing vocals: James LoMenzo

Artwork

Photographer/album art – Jakob Muxoll

== Charts ==
Chart performance for Trampthology
Chart (2020)	Peak position
Danish Albums (Hitlisten)	17

Chart performance for Everything Is Alright
Chart (2021)	Peak position
Danish albums	24
Swiss Albums (Schweizer Hitparade)	82
