= Maybe Tomorrow (Mike Tramp album) =

Studio album by Mike Tramp
- Released: February 24, 2017
- Recorded: 2016
- Genre: Soft rock, melodic rock
- Label: Target Records

Mike Tramp chronology
Nomad (2015)	Maybe Tomorrow (2017)	Stray from the Flock (2019)

Singles from Maybe Tomorrow
- 1. "Coming Home" Released: 2017; 2. "Would I Lie to You" Released: 2017; 3. "Spring" Released: 2017; 4. "Rust and Dust" Released: 2018

Maybe Tomorrow is the tenth solo album by former White Lion and Freak of Nature lead singer Mike Tramp, released on February 24, 2017, through Mighty Music/Target Records.

== Background and recording ==
Maybe Tomorrow follows on from Tramp's recent trilogy of albums: Cobblestone Street, Museum and 2015's Nomad.

The album was recorded at Medley studio, Copenhagen with Soren Andersen behind the knobs and on guitar. This is Tramp's sixth consecutive studio album working with Andersen. Known as the 'Band of Brothers' the album also features Morten Hellborn on drums, Jesper Haugaard on bass, and Morten Buchholtz on Hammond organ and piano, making it the same line-up as Nomad.

== Release and promotion ==
In January 2017, Tramp launched a music video for the first single "Coming Home", which was filmed and edited by Kennie Østed. In February 2017, the song "Would I Lie to You" was released as the second single from the album followed by the third single "Spring" released in May 2017. In 2018 "Rust and Dust" was also released as a single.

Tramp toured Europe to support Maybe Tomorrow.

Mike Tramp has topped the Danish album sales charts (certified by IFPI), debuted at number one on the vinyl chart and number two on the physical albums chart.

== Track listing ==
No.	Title	Length
1.	"Coming Home"	6:33
2.	"It's Not How We Do It"	4:43
3.	"Spring"	4:37
4.	"Would I Lie to You"	4:32
5.	"Rust and Dust"	5:42
6.	"Leaving One Day"	4:34
7.	"Time and Place"	4:39
8.	"What More Can I Say"	4:48
9.	"Why Even Worry at All"	4:41
10.	"Maybe Tomorrow"	6:04

== Personnel ==
- Mike Tramp – vocals, acoustic guitar
- Søren Andersen – guitar, piano
- Morten Hellborn – drums
- Jesper Haugaard – bass
- Morten Buchholz – keyboards

Touring

- Claus Langeskov – bass
- Kenny Andy – drums

== Charts ==
Chart (2017)	Peak position
Danish Albums (Hitlisten)	20
