= Stray from the Flock =

Studio album by Mike Tramp
- Released: March 1, 2019
- Recorded: 2018
- Genre: Soft rock; melodic rock
- Length: 53:44
- Label: Target Records

Mike Tramp chronology
Maybe Tomorrow (2017)	Stray from the Flock (2019)	Second Time Around (2020)

Singles from Stray from the Flock
- 1. "Dead End Ride" Released: 2019; 2. "Homesick" Released: 2019; 3. "Best Days of My Life" Released: 2019

Stray from the Flock is the eleventh solo album by former White Lion and Freak of Nature lead singer, Mike Tramp, released on March 1, 2019 through Mighty Music/Target Records. The album was released on CD, double gatefold LP on black 140G vinyl, LTD double gatefold LP on orange colour LP 180G (500 copies only) digital, and cassette.

== Background and recording ==
Stray from the Flock was recorded at Ark Studio in Denmark and mixed in Sweden by Peter Masson and essentially takes the 2013 release Cobblestone Street template one step further. The album follows on from Maybe Tomorrow from 2017 and according to Tramp the new album wrote itself.

== Release and promotion ==
On January 25, 2019, Tramp released the song/video, "Dead End Ride", as the first single from the album. A second single, "Homesick", was released on March 29, 2019.

Tramp went on tour in 2019 to support the album with over 100 shows planned, starting off in the US with 22 shows.

Tramp released a third single "Best Days of My Life". The song, also available as a lyric video, was released in connection with his extensive European tour in the late 2019.

== Track listing ==
No.	Title	Length
1.	"No End to War"	8:37
2.	"Dead End Ride"	4:07
3.	"Homesick"	5:01
4.	"You Ain't Free No More"	4:32
5.	"No Closure"	5:39
6.	"One Last Mission"	5:40
7.	"Live It Out"	3:42
8.	"Messiah"	5:50
9.	"Best Days of My Life"	5:33
10.	"Die with a Smile on Your Face"	5:03
11.	"The Way It Was Before" (Japanese bonus track)	3:35

== Personnel ==
- Mike Tramp – vocals, acoustic guitar
- Søren Andersen – guitar, piano
- Claus Langeskov – bass guitar
- Kenny Andy – drums
- Morten Buchholz – keyboards

=== Additional personnel ===
- Oliver Steffenson – guitar (tracks 3 and 5)
- Kenny Korade – guitar (track 9)
- Marcus Nand – guitar (tracks 1 and 10)
- Henrik Berger – guitar (tracks 4 and 7)
- Emily Garriock – backing vocals

=== Artwork ===
Photographer/album art - Jakob Muxoll

== Charts ==
Chart (2019)	Peak position
Danish Albums (Hitlisten)	26
