= What the F Is Heavy Metal? =

What the F is Heavy Metal?

Studio album by The *uckers
- Released: 2026
- Genre: Heavy metal
- Label: Cleopatra Records

What the F is Heavy Metal? is the upcoming first studio album by heavy metal band The *uckers. Set to be released in winter of 2026, it features three original songs and three covers of metal songs. The album will feature guest appearances from Tony Iommi, Brian May, Rob Halford, John Moyer, and Dave Lombardo.

== Background ==
The album title originates from a conversation William Shatner had with Brian Perera, founder of Cleopatra Records, who suggested Shatner tackle heavy metal, with Shatner responding "What the fuck is heavy metal?".

In an interview, Shatner said that the album started after he recorded a one-off spoken-word intro piece for former Megadeth guitarist Chris Poland. Shatner found the experience so inspiring that he set out to create a metal album of his own.

== Promotion ==
Songs from the album were played live during a Riot Fest aftershow at Park West in Chicago and during their show at Riot Fest 2026 on the Rebel Stage, which marked the world premiere of the band.

== Confirmed songs ==
- "Rage"
- "Sky"
- "One Fear"
- "Crazy Train"
- "Enter Sandman"
- "Ace of Spades"
