= Freak of Nature (Freak of Nature album) =

Studio album by Freak of Nature
- Released: March 29, 1993
- Studio: Arne Frager's The Plant Recording Studios, Sausalito
- Genre: Hard rock, heavy metal
- Length: 47:42
- Label: Music for Nations
- Producer: Freak of Nature, Phil Kaffel

Freak of Nature chronology
| Freak of Nature (1993) | Gathering of Freaks (1994) |

Singles from Freak of Nature
- 1. "Rescue Me" Released: 1993; 2. "Turn the Other Way" Released: 1993

Freak of Nature is the self-titled debut album by American hard rock band Freak of Nature, released on March 29, 1993. The band features former White Lion vocalist Mike Tramp who formed Freak of Nature following White Lion's last album release The Best of White Lion in 1992.

== Background and recording ==
The album was produced by Phil Kaffel and recorded at the Plant Studios in Sausalito, California and although the record, released through Music For Nations, did not shift in large quantities Freak of Nature's relentless work ethic brought in many admirers. The band toured for eight months in support of the album, playing a mixture of headlining shows, mainly in Britain, including gigs at the Roskilde Festival on July 2, and support slots for Helloween in September and Dio in November.

== Release and promotion ==
"Rescue Me" was released as the lead single for the album and "Turn the Other Way" was also released as a promo single. Both singles featured music videos.

"Possessed" and "Are You Ready?," were co-written with original guitarist Oliver Steffensen before he left the band and was replaced by Dennis Chick. Steffensen and Tramp had written four other songs, "Blame It on the Fool," "One Love," "Disturbing the Peace," and "Back Where You Belong," which were later released on Outcasts.

Tramp remarked that the producer Phil Kaffel "captured the raw energy" of the band perfectly and recorded them entirely live in less than a week, which he said was a very different way of producing than his work with White Lion.

A concert from the supporting tour was released on DVD in 2004 titled "Freak of Nature: Live in Japan 1993".

The album is dedicated to Tramp's son Dylan and Thin Lizzy vocalist Phil Lynott.

== Track listing ==
1. "Turn the Other Way"
2. "What Am I"
3. "Rescue Me"
4. "'92"
5. "People"
6. "World Doesn't Mind"
7. "Possessed"
8. "Where Can I Go"
9. "If I Leave"
10. "Love Was Here"
11. "Are You Ready" (Japanese bonus track)

== Personnel ==
- Mike Tramp – vocals
- Dennis Chick – lead guitar
- Kenny Korade – rhythm guitar
- Jerry Best – bass guitar
- Johnny Haro – drums
