= Nomad (Mike Tramp album) =

Studio album by Mike Tramp
- Released: August 28, 2015
- Recorded: 2014
- Genre: Soft rock, melodic rock
- Label: Target Records

Mike Tramp chronology
Museum (2014)	Nomad (2015)	Maybe Tomorrow (2017)

Singles from Nomad
- 1. "High Like a Mountain" Released: 2015; 2. "Give It All You Got" Released: 2015; 3. "Stay" Released: 2016

Nomad is the ninth solo album by former White Lion and Freak of Nature lead singer, Mike Tramp, released August 28, 2015 on Target Records.

== Background and recording ==
The album completes a trilogy of albums which included Cobblestone Street in 2013 and his last release Museum in 2014. Tramp has returned with a full band line up for this album which includes long-time producer, engineer and guitarist Soren Andersen, their Rock’n’Roll Circuz drummer Morten Hellborn, keyboardist Morten Buchholz and bassist Jesper Haugaard.

== Release and promotion ==
In July 2015, Mike Tramp released the first single "High Like a Mountain", and in August Tramp released the radio single and music video "Give It All You Got", the video of which was filmed and edited in Copenhagen.

The album charted at Denmark's official top 40 hitlist albums at number 21.

Mike Tramp with special guest Lucer embarked on a European tour in the late summer of 2015 with concerts in Denmark, Germany, Sweden, England, Netherlands, Belgium, Northern Ireland, Ireland, Scotland and Wales, France and Switzerland.

In 2016, following up on Nomad's success and the award for "Classic Rock Album Of The Year" at High Voltage Rock Awards, Tramp released the single "Stay" which received much airplay on Danish national radio. "Stay" comes with a video that shows Tramp in total isolation, living the life of a forest worker in the beautiful Scandinavian woods.

== Track listing ==
No.	Title	Length
1.	"Give It All You Got"	4:07
2.	"Wait Till Forever"	4:39
3.	"Counting the Hours"	5:07
4.	"Bow and Obey"	4:46
5.	"High Like a Mountain"	4:57
6.	"No More"	3:29
7.	"Stay"	4:17
8.	"Who Can You Believe"	4:16
9.	"Live to Tell"	4:47
10.	"Moving On"	4:59

== Personnel ==
- Mike Tramp – vocals, acoustic guitar
- Søren Andersen – guitar, piano
- Morten Hellborn – drums
- Jesper Haugaard – bass
- Morten Buchholz – keyboards

== Charts ==
Chart (2015)	Peak position
Danish Albums	21
