= Mike Tramp & The Rock 'N' Roll Circuz =

2009 studio album by Mike Tramp

Studio album by Mike Tramp
- Released: October 5, 2009
- Genre: Hard rock
- Label: Kick Music / Sony Music dk

Mike Tramp chronology
Songs I Left Behind (2004)	Mike Tramp & The Rock 'N' Roll Circuz (2009)	Stand Your Ground (2011)

Singles from The Rock 'N' Roll Circuz
- 1. "All of my Life" Released: 2009; 2. "Come On" Released: 2009

Mike Tramp & The Rock 'N' Roll Circuz is a studio album by former Freak of Nature and current White Lion lead vocalist Mike Tramp, released on October 5, 2009. The album is Tramp's fifth solo album and the first since 2004's Songs I Left Behind.

== Background and recording ==
Following the release of Return of the Pride in 2008 which was White Lion's first original studio album in 16 years, Tramp faced a tumultuous time of professional indecision as he tried to decide between continuing his solo career or pouring his energy into White Lion. The album was initially intended to be the next new White Lion album but a new solo band was formed instead.

The new album was co-produced in Copenhagen, Denmark, with guitar player Søren Andersen, and both band and album were named after the atmosphere in the studio. "(The recording experience) made us visualize this old fallen apart circus," said Tramp. "From there we built certain things into the songs and into the album". During the making of the album, Tramp appeared on the Danish reality music TV show "All Stars".

== Release and promotion ==
Released only in Denmark via Kick Music/Sony Music, the album hit the IFPI, Denmark's official top 40 hitlist albums chart at number 16 on October 16, 2009.

The songs, "All Of My Life" and "Come On", were released as singles from the album. "Come On" also featured a teaser music video.

== Track listing ==
No.	Title	Length
1.	"Enter the Circuz"	1:03
2.	"All of My Life"	6:46
3.	"Back to You"	3:46
4.	"Come On"	3:57
5.	"Anymore"	4:50
6.	"Highway"	5:17
7.	"No Tomorrow"	4:43
8.	"The Road"	4:43
9.	"Sunshine"	4:04
10.	"Between Good 'n' Bad"	4:03
11.	"Wiseman"	3:52
12.	"When She Cries"	4:46
13.	"Lay Down Your Guns"	6:13

== Personnel ==
- Mike Tramp – vocals, guitar
- Claus Langeskov – bass guitar
- Søren Andersen – guitar
- Morten Hellborn – drums
- Emily Garriock – keyboards, Vocals

== Second Time Around ==
Second Time Around

Studio album by Mike Tramp
- Released: May 1, 2020
- Studio: Medley Studios
- Genre: Hard rock, melodic rock
- Label: Target Records

Mike Tramp chronology
Stray from the Flock (2019)	Second Time Around (2020)	Trampthology (2020)

Singles from Second Time Around
- 1. "The Road" Released: 2020; 2. "Between Good and Bad" Released: 2020; 3. "When She Cries" Released: 2020

Second Time Around is the twelfth solo album by Mike Tramp, released on May 1, 2020, through Target Records. It consists of ten re-recordings from his 2009 album, The Rock 'N' Roll Circuz. The new versions were produced by Mike Tramp and Soren Anderson at Medley Studios in Copenhagen.

Further singles were released to promote this new release with "The Road" which also features a new music video and the radio single "Between Good and Bad", both being released in advance. The new version of "When She Cries" was also released as a single following the album's official release, the song was dedicated to his daughter.

=== Track listing ===
No.	Title	Length
1.	"All of My Life"
2.	"The Road"
3.	"Anymore"
4.	"Come On"
5.	"Between Good and Bad"
6.	"Lay Down Your Guns"
7.	"Highway"
8.	"No Tomorrow"
9.	"Back to You"
10.	"When She Cries"

=== Personnel ===
- Mike Tramp: vocals, electric and acoustic guitar, piano
- Oliver Steffensen: guitar
- Soren Andersen: additional guitar
- Claus Langeskov: bass
- Morten Hellborn: drums

Additional

- Marcus Nand: 12 string acoustic guitar
- Jay Boe: Hammond B-3
- Emily Garriock Langeskov: backing vocals
- Lars Rahbek Andresen: piano on "Highway"

Artwork

Photographer/album art – Jakob Muxoll

== Charts ==
Chart performance for The Rock 'N' Roll Circuz
Chart (2009)	Peak position
Denmark (Hitlisten)	16

Chart performance for Second Time Around
Chart (2020)	Peak position
Danish Albums (Hitlisten)	6
Swiss Albums (Schweizer Hitparade)	66
