= Outcasts (Freak of Nature album) =

Compilation album by Freak of Nature
- Released: November 2, 1998
- Recorded: Various
- Genre: Hard rock, heavy metal
- Label: Ulftone Records

Freak of Nature chronology
Gathering of Freaks (1994)	Outcasts (1998)

Outcasts is the third and final album from the hard rock band Freak of Nature, released in 1998. The album is a collection of B-sides, demos and outtakes released through Ulftone Records. Most of the tracks had never been released before with the exception of a few tracks being released as b-sides to previous singles.

== Overview ==
Several songs were co-written with original guitarist Oliver Steffensen before he left the band and was replaced by Dennis Chick. Later an album titled "Brothers For Life" was released under the moniker "Mike & Oliver" containing pre Freak of Nature material including the original versions of "One Love" and "Disturbing the Peace". The album was Tramp's progression from White Lion to Freak of Nature.

Following Freak of Nature lead vocalist Mike Tramp started a solo career releasing his debut solo album "Capricorn" in 1998. Tramp also reformed White Lion with a new line up releasing the album "Remembering White Lion" in 1999.

In 2003 a box set titled Freakthology was released which featured all three Freak of Nature albums as well as the three videos of "Rescue Me," "Turn the Other Way," and "Enemy."

In 2014, Tramp stated that a Freak of Nature reunion would only be possible with the original members.

== Track listing ==
1. "Blame it on the Fool"
2. "One Love"
3. "Where You Belong"
4. "Wartime"
5. "Dead and Gone"
6. "What am I" (Acoustic)
7. "I Regret"
8. "Can't Find My Way"
9. "If"
10. "Turn the Other Way" (Acoustic)
11. "Are You Ready?"
12. "Possessed" (Alternate version)
13. "Disturbing the Peace"

== Personnel ==
- Mike Tramp – vocals
- Dennis Chick – lead guitar
- Kenny Korade – rhythm guitar
- Jerry Best – bass guitar
- Johnny Haro – drums
- Marcus Nand - rhythm guitar
- Oliver Steffensen - lead Guitar
