= Gathering of Freaks =

Studio album by Freak of Nature
- Released: 1994
- Genre: Hard rock, heavy metal
- Length: 52:33
- Label: Music For Nations
- Producer: Phil Kaffel

Freak of Nature chronology
Freak of Nature (1993)	Gathering of Freaks (1994)	Outcasts (1998)

Singles from Gathering of Freaks
- 1. "Enemy" Released: 1994

Professional ratings
Review scores
Source	Rating
Allmusic	4.5/5 stars

Gathering of Freaks is the second album from the hard rock band Freak of Nature, fronted by former White Lion lead singer Mike Tramp, released in 1994.

== Overview ==
The album spent one week at #66 on the UK Albums Chart in October 1994. It was the band's only UK chart presence. The album was recorded in Canoga Park, California, and North Hollywood, California with producer Phil Kaffel. All songs were written by the band with lyrics provided by Mike Tramp.

Following the release of the album guitarist Kenny Korade was replaced by Marcus Nand and the band undertook another tour in support of the album.

The promo single "Enemy" featured a music video.

== Track listing ==
1. "The Gathering"
2. "Enemy"
3. "Stand Back"
4. "Raping the Cradle"
5. "Big Black Hole"
6. "The Tree"
7. "Candle"
8. "Need"
9. "Open Space"
10. "Get It Yourself"
11. "Powerless"
12. "The Parting"

== Personnel ==
- Mike Tramp – vocals
- Dennis Chick – lead guitar
- Kenny Korade – rhythm guitar
- Jerry Best – bass guitar
- Johnny Haro – drums

Touring Members

- Marcus Nand – rhythm guitar

== Charts ==
Chart (1994)	Peak position
UK Albums (OCC)	66
UK Rock & Metal Albums (OCC)	19
