= David Fishof =

American talent agent

- Born: New York City, New York, United States
- Occupations: Rock producer, sports agent
- Known for: Founder of Rock 'n' Roll Fantasy Camp
- Website: Official website

David Fishof is an American music producer, sports agent, and the founder and CEO of Rock 'n' Roll Fantasy Camp. Born in New York City, Fishof began his career representing acts in the Catskill Mountains. From there he went on to represent Herschel Bernardi and other entertainers.

He became a sports agent, representing Phil Simms, Mark Bavaro, Vince Ferragamo, Jack Reynolds, Lou Piniella, Dave Magadan and Randy Myers, among others.

During his time as a sports agent and thereafter, he started producing live tours. He went on to work with Ringo Starr, The Monkees, Roger Daltrey, and numerous other well known acts.

He has authored three books, Putting It on The Line, a book about his experiences in the world of sports and entertainment, Rock Your Business: What You and Your Company Can Learn From The Business of Rock and Roll, and Rock Camp, An Oral History: 25 Years of the Rock 'n' Roll Fantasy Camp.

Fishof also speaks publicly and was the featured speaker at the "National Speakers Association" annual conference held at the Marriott Marquis hotel in New York City's Times Square in 2008.

== Tour Producer ==
In 1981, Fishof began representing the sunshine pop band the Association (who had such hits as "Along Comes Mary", "Cherish", "Windy", and "Never My Love") and in 1984 assembled a tour with them entitled "The Happy Together Tour", which also included The Turtles, Gary Puckett and Spanky and Our Gang. "Happy Together" toured again in 1985 with The Turtles, Gary Lewis, The Grass Roots, The Buckinghams and Tommy James and the Shondells. The tour lasted eight months and was one of the top 10 grossing tours in the country at the time.

In 1986, Fishof produced the Monkees 20th Anniversary Reunion Tour in collaboration with MTV running "Monkee Marathons". He then produced "The American Bandstand Concert Tour" with Dick Clark. In 1987, Fishof produced "Classic Superfest" which featured bands from the 70's with performances by The Turtles with Flo and Eddie, Herman's Hermits, The Grass Roots, Mark Lindsay and The Byrds featuring Gene Clark, Paul Revere and the Raiders, Dr. Hook and BTO.

In 1988, Fishof produced the "Dirty Dancing Live Tour". It sold out all eight nights at Radio City Music Hall in New York City in 24 hours. The show included Bill Medley singing "Time of My Life", and Eric Carmen singing, "Hungry Eyes". The production traveled throughout America and went on to tour Europe and Australia.

Fishof then contacted Ringo Starr to pitch a conceptual tour called Ringo Starr & His All-Starr Band, which saw Starr and various accomplished rock musicians play their hits together in one band. From 1989 to 2003, Fishof produced eight different tours with Ringo Starr & His All-Starr Band.

In 1991, Fishof created The American Gladiators Live Tour with Kenneth Feld, owner of Ringling Brothers Barnum and Bailey Circus. The tour took Gladiators to local arenas where amateur athletes could challenge them. Fishof can be seen discussing this tour in the 2023 Netflix series Muscles & Mayhem: An Unauthorized Story of American Gladiators.

In 1999, Fishof created the British Rock Symphony, which featured Roger Daltrey of The Who, Alice Cooper, and Jon Anderson of Yes. The British Rock Symphony is a CD, DVD and live show featuring the symphonic music of The Beatles, The Rolling Stones, Led Zeppelin, Pink Floyd and The Who.

After parting ways with Ringo Starr in 2003, Fishof largely turned his focus away from tour producing to focus on new ventures in entertainment.

== Rock 'n' Roll Fantasy Camp ==
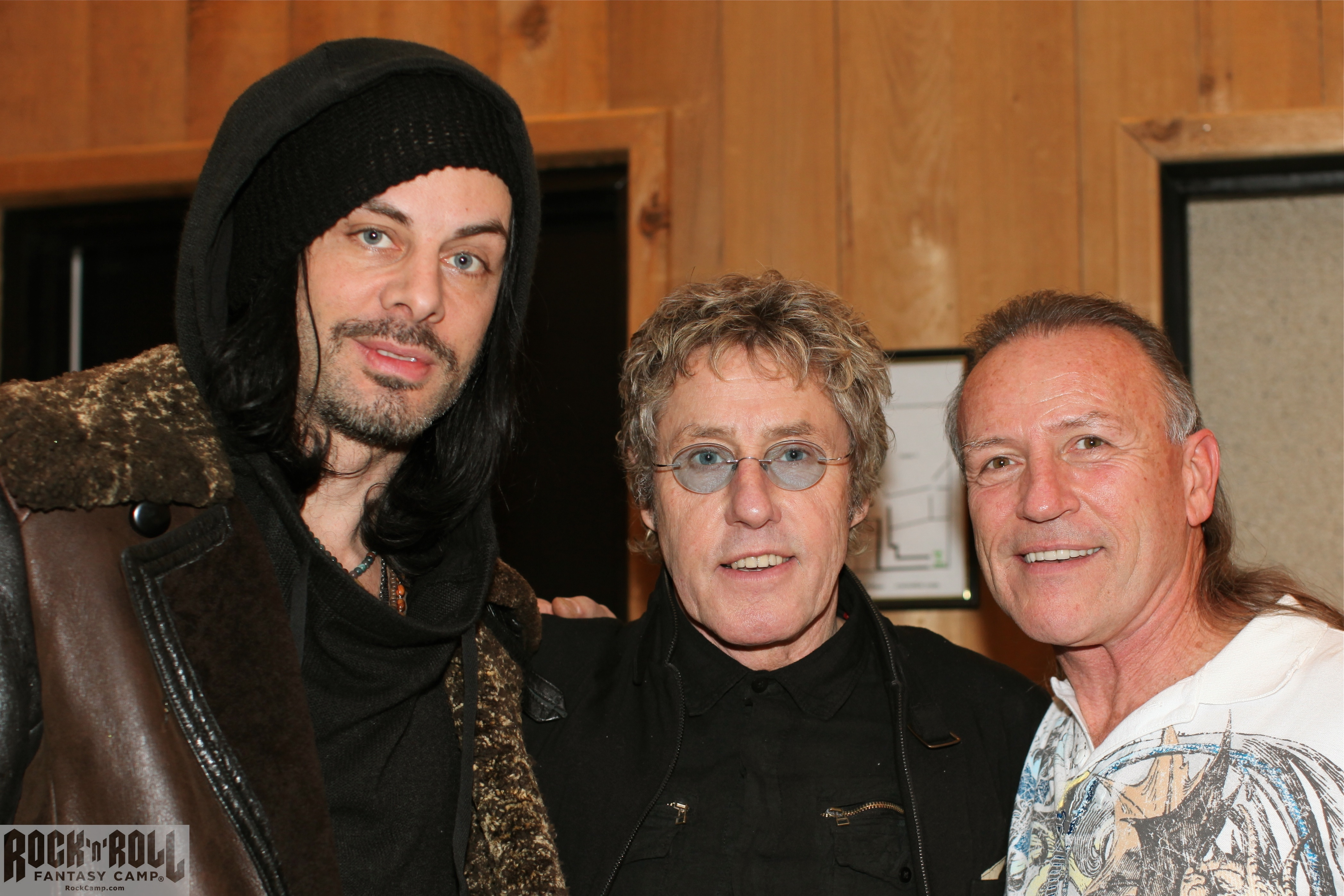
Richie Kotzen, Roger Daltrey, and Mark Farner at one of Fishof's Rock 'n' Roll Fantasy Camps.

During a 1989 tour with Ringo's All-Starr Band, Joe Walsh and Levon Helm played a practical joke on Fishof by pretending to get into a fight with knives. After it was revealed to be a prank, Fishof saw how much fun these musicians were having together, and began thinking about how to bring this experience to the public. In 1997, he launched the first Rock 'n Roll Fantasy Camp, which allows people from all walks of life to jam with their musical heroes.

Fishof continues to produce Rock 'n' Roll Fantasy Camps in various locations worldwide, including stars such as Joe Perry, Brian Wilson, Vince Neil, Nancy Wilson, Dave Mustaine, Slash, Jeff Beck, Judas Priest, Def Leppard, members of Kiss, and many others.

Unable to hold live camps during the 2020 COVID-19 pandemic, Fishof launched an online series called Rock Camp Masterclasses held via Zoom. The classes featured musicians, music business executives, producers, and songwriters, including Roger Daltrey, Jason Flom (founder of Lava Records), Eddie Kramer, and Desmond Child, among others.

== Television Producer ==
In 2010, Fishof co-produced, with Mark Burnett Productions, a reality television series on his fantasy camp. The show, titled "Rock and Roll Fantasy Camp," aired on VH1 Classic for two seasons.

In 2023, it was announced that Fishof, alongside producers Jeff Rowe and Steve Basilone, had begun developing a Single-camera sitcom called "Rock Camp" with Fox.

== Rock Camp: The Movie ==
In 2021, Fishof's life story was told in the documentary Rock Camp: The Movie. As a result of the film, Fishof was featured and/or interviewed in Rolling Stone, USA Today, The Washington Post, Billboard, and numerous other major platforms.

== Comedy Fantasy Camp ==
In 2023, Fishof partnered with comedian and podcast host Adam Carolla to create Comedy Fantasy Camp, announcing Jay Leno as their first headliner. Comedy Fantasy Camp takes a similar structure to that of Rock 'n' Roll Fantasy Camp and applies it to various types of comedic arts.
