= Rock Camp: The Movie =

2021 documentary film

- Rock Camp: The Movie official poster (2021).
- Directed by: Doug Blush and Renée Barron
- Produced by: Jeff Rowe and Doug Blush
- Starring: Alice Cooper; Roger Daltrey; Sammy Hagar; Judas Priest; Joe Perry; Gene Simmons; Paul Stanley
- Cinematography: Miles Wilkerson
- Edited by: Renée Barron; Josh Bayer; Doug Blush; Kimberly Furst
- Music by: Andrew Skrabutenas
- Production company: Madpix Films
- Release date: 2021
- Language: English

Rock Camp: The Movie is a 2021 documentary film about Rock 'n' Roll Fantasy Camp, an interactive music event involving professional musicians.

== Synopsis ==
Rock Camp: The Movie follows a group of attendees as they travel to Rock 'n' Roll Fantasy Camp to play music with and learn from professional musicians such as Paul Stanley of Kiss, Judas Priest, and Dave Mustaine of Megadeth, among others. Throughout the duration of camp, the attendees partake in an array of activities, navigate and conquer fears and goals, and ultimately perform live at a nearby venue. Subjects addressed in the film include disability, comeback stories, and musical accomplishments, among others. Additionally, the film tells the story of Rock 'n' Roll Fantasy Camp founder David Fishof, and how he transitioned from a sports agent to a music producer, and ultimately founded Rock Camp.

== Cast ==
=== Headlining Rockstars ===
- Roger Daltrey, rockstar headliner
- Gene Simmons, rockstar headliner
- Jeff Beck, rockstar headliner
- Slash, rockstar headliner
- Sammy Hagar, rockstar headliner
- Paul Stanley, rockstar headliner
- Sebastian Bach, rockstar headliner
- Jerry Cantrell, rockstar headliner
- Alice Cooper, rockstar headliner
- Nancy Wilson, rockstar headliner
- Rob Halford, rockstar headliner
- Richie Faulkner, rockstar headliner
- Warren Haynes, rockstar headliner
- Dave Mustaine, rockstar headliner
- Mike Inez, rockstar headliner
- Meat Loaf, rockstar headliner
- Joe Perry, rockstar headliner
- Brian Wilson, rockstar headliner

=== Rockstar Counselors ===
- Teddy Andreadis, rockstar counselor
- Vinny Appice, rockstar counselor
- Spike Edney, rockstar counselor
- Lita Ford, rockstar counselor
- Tony Franklin, rockstar counselor
- Gary Hoey, rockstar counselor
- Bruce Kulick, rockstar counselor
- Nita Strauss, rockstar counselor
- Rudy Sarzo, rockstar counselor
- Chip Z'Nuff, rockstar counselor
- Tanya O'Callaghan, rockstar counselor
- Jason Ebs, rockstar counselor

=== Campers ===
- Rick Harrison, camper
- Scott 'Pistol' Crockett, camper
- Tammy Fisher, camper
- Scott Keller, camper
- Jackson Keller, camper
- Blake Meinhardt, camper
- Miles Schuman, camper / Q&A Host

=== Other ===
- David Fishof, Rock 'n' Roll Fantasy Camp founder

== Reception ==
Articles and reviews of the film were featured in national publications including Rolling Stone, USA Today, Billboard, among others.

Rock Camp won Best Music and Arts Film at the 2020 Key West Film Festival.

The film received a 89% rating on Rotten Tomatoes based on 18 reviews.

In April 2021, comedian Jimmy Fallon was quoted as saying he "loved" the documentary on The Tonight Show.
