= Recovering the Wasted Years =

Studio album by Mike Tramp
- Released: January 1, 2002
- Genre: Hard rock
- Label: Ulftone

Mike Tramp chronology
Capricorn (1998)	Recovering the Wasted Years (2002)	More to Life Than This (2003)

Singles from Recovering the Wasted Years
- 1. "Living a Lie" Released: 2002; 2. "Endless Highway" Released: 2002; 3. "Do It All Over" Released: 2002

Recovering the Wasted Years is the second solo album by former White Lion and Freak of Nature lead singer, Mike Tramp, released on 1 January 2002.

== Background and recording ==
The album marks a return to recording following a five-year hiatus since his first solo release, Capricorn, during which time Tramp parted with his former management and label and moved to Australia, with the aim of raising his son away from the rigors of a big city and to plan his next career move.

The album was recorded in Media Sound Studios in Copenhagen, produced by Mike Tramp and mixed by Phil Kaffel. The CD was released as limited edition digipack which came with a free Mike Tramp signature guitar pick. Former Freak of Nature bandmate, Kenny Korade once again features on guitars for the album.

== Release and promotion ==
The track "Living a Lie" was released as the album's first single followed by "Endless Highway" with both songs featuring live music videos. "Do It All Over" was released as a promo single.

From 2001, following the release of the album Remembering White Lion and during the recording of this album, Tramp was attempting to reform the original White Lion line up as he continued his solo career at the same time, but by the end of 2003 had given up on the reunion and moved on with a new White Lion line up in 2004.

== Track listing ==
No.	Title	Length
1.	"Falling Down"	5:51
2.	"Living a Lie"	3:29
3.	"Mr. Death"	3:47
4.	"If It Ain't Gonna Rock"	4:44
5.	"All Up to You"	4:02
6.	"Endless Highway"	4:41
7.	"Darkness"	5:58
8.	"Follow Your Dreams"	5:05
9.	"Do It All Over"	3:32
10.	"Take It Easy"	3:43
11.	"Don't Take My Rock 'N' Roll"	2:21
12.	"Always Tomorrow"	3:54

== Personnel ==
- Mike Tramp – vocals, electric guitar, acoustic guitar
- Kasper Damgaard – guitar
- Kenny Korade – rhythm guitar
- Emil Bendixen – bass guitar, backing vocals
- Kasper Foss – drums
- Dan Hemmer – Hammond B-3
- Guillermo Pascual – piano
- Mads Schou – harmonica
- Oliver Steffensen – guitar (10)
