= Rock 'n Roll Fantasy Camp =

Musical event

Rock 'n' Roll Fantasy Camp
- Genre: Live music
- Frequency: Six times per year
- Location: Various
- Inaugurated: 1997; 29 years ago (by David Fishof)
- Attendance: Approximately 6,000 (since inception)
- Website: rockcamp.com

The Rock 'n' Roll Fantasy Camp is an interactive musical event that takes place in various locations worldwide involving various rock stars on various dates.

Attendees play, write and record music in professional rehearsal and recording studios alongside those from the music industry, culminating in an event where attendees perform live on stage at a well known venue. Participants are formed into bands, each with its own rock star mentor. Over the course of the experience, campers learn band dynamics, song writing, receive instrument training, and hear from industry speakers and participate in Q&A sessions with well known musicians.

The event is targeted at players of any talent level, from novice to advanced. It is geared more toward adults, with the average attendee age being between 35 and 55. Founded in 1997 by David Fishof, approximately 6,000 people have thus far participated.

The camp's current musical director is Britt Lightning, lead guitarist for the band Vixen.

== Celebrity attendees ==
The celebrities at Rock 'n' Roll Fantasy Camp consist primarily of "headliners" and "rockstar counselors."

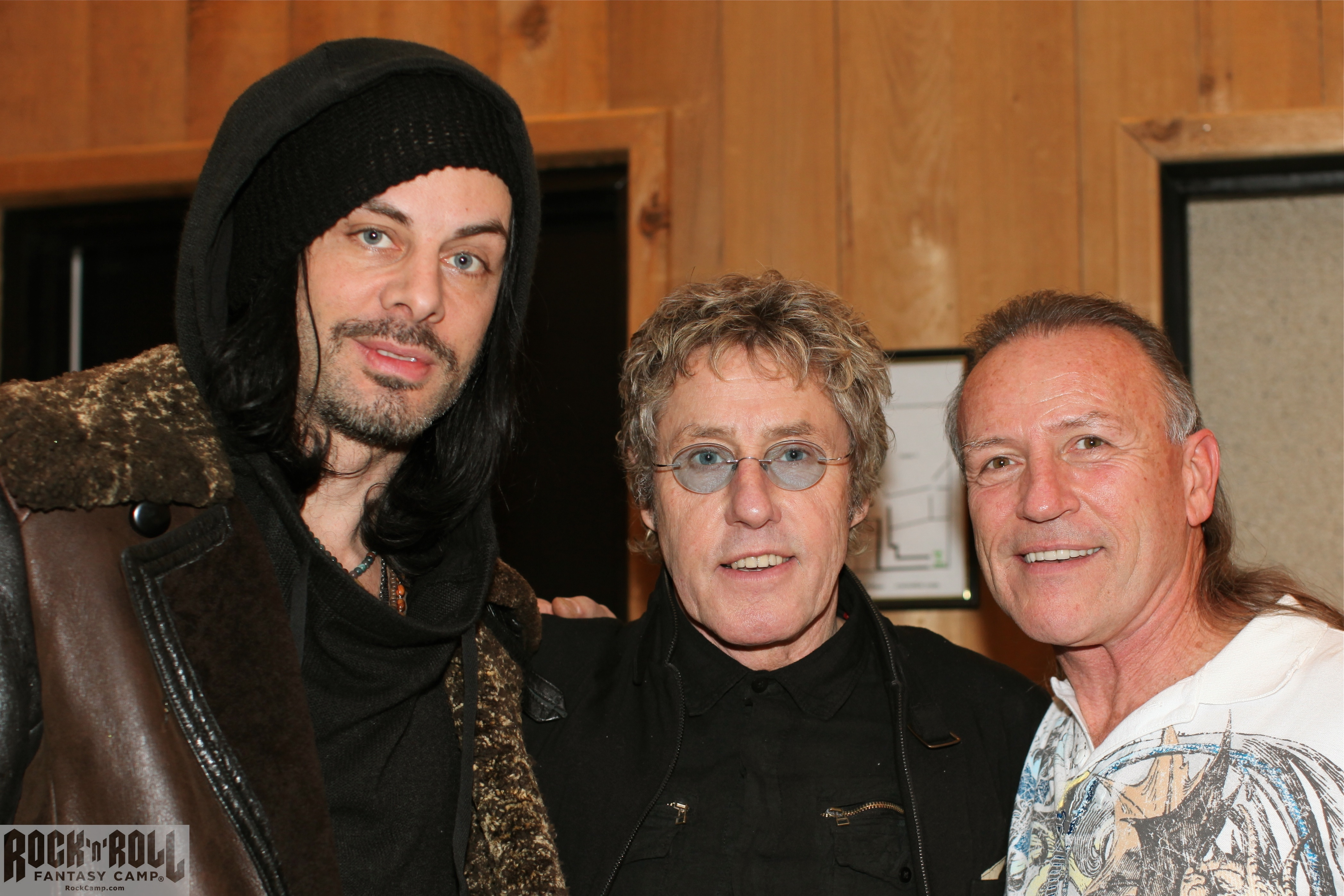
Richie Kotzen, Roger Daltrey, and Mark Farner at Rock 'n' Roll Fantasy Camp

Past headliners have included:

- Roger Daltrey (The Who)
- Jerry Cantrell (Alice in Chains)
- Mike Inez (Alice in Chains)
- Ace Frehley (Kiss)
- Bret Michaels (Poison)
- Steven Tyler (Aerosmith)
- Vince Neil (Mötley Crüe)
- Bill Wyman (Rolling Stones)
- Nicko McBrain (Iron Maiden)
- Steve Morse (Deep Purple)
- Dave Mustaine (Megadeth)

Past counselors have included:

- Vinny Appice
- Phil X
- Teddy Andreadis
- Nita Strauss
- Lita Ford
- Rudy Sarzo
- Derek St. Holmes
- Sandy Gennaro

== Television Series ==
A reality television series, titled Rock N' Roll Fantasy Camp, produced by Mark Burnett Productions aired on VH1 Classic for two seasons. The first season featured counselors Rudy Sarzo, Kip Winger, and Mark Hudson, mentoring bands consisting of "camper" participants, including NFL player Cory Procter. Special guest stars included Ace Frehley, Bret Michaels, Michael Anthony, Lita Ford, and Lemmy Kilmister, among others. The season one premiere broke all viewing records for VH1 Classic. Season two featured counselors Matt Sorum, Duff McKagan, and Mark Hudson. Special guests, among others, included Paul Stanley, Phil Collen, Marky Ramone and Sammy Hagar. The show was not renewed for a third season.

== Online Masterclasses ==
At the start of the COVID-19 pandemic, Rock 'n' Roll Fantasy Camp launched an online Masterclass program, hosted via Zoom. In less than a year, they held more than 100 classes with musicians and music industry executives ranging from Alice Cooper to Roger Daltrey, Dave Mustaine, Desmond Child, Jason Flom, and numerous others.

== Rock Camp: The Movie ==
In January 2021, a documentary film on the past two and a half decades of Rock 'n' Roll Fantasy Camp was released. The film, titled Rock Camp: The Movie follows the history of the camp, its founder, and the different artists and campers who attend. The film was directed by Doug Blush, known for his work on over 100 documentaries. In April 2021, comedian Jimmy Fallon was quoted as saying he "loved" the documentary on The Tonight Show.

Rock Camp: The Movie is available to watch on Amazon Prime, Apple TV, YouTube as well as other streaming platforms.

== Rock Camp: The Podcast ==
In January 2024, Rock 'n' Roll Fantasy Camp launched an official weekly podcast, called Rock Camp: The Podcast. The podcast focuses on current and past camp stories and content, with new and archival interviews featuring talent and attendees who have participated in the camp over the course of its history. The podcast is hosted by Fishof, Britt Lightning, and Tommy London, and is produced by Pantheon Podcasts.

== Comedy Fantasy Camp ==
In 2023, Rock 'n' Roll Fantasy Camp partnered with The Adam Carolla Show to launch Comedy Fantasy Camp, the first of which featured Jay Leno as headliner, alongside Adam Carolla. Attendees take classes on stand-up comedy, improv comedy, podcasting, among other comedic mediums, and perform at the Hollywood Improv in Los Angeles on the final night.

== In popular culture ==
- In the episode "How I Spent My Strummer Vacation" (2002) of the television series The Simpsons, Homer Simpson attends the camp and plays with Mick Jagger and Keith Richards.
- The camp was featured in the episode "Ellen Unplugged" (1997), of the television series, Ellen.
- The camp was the setting in "Bones", episode 19 of V series.
- On "Pawn Stars" Rick 'n' Roll (TV Episode 2013), Rick Harrison fulfills his fantasy by singing with Roger Daltrey of the Who. Rick states, "I sang with Roger Daltrey. I can now die".
- SNL Season 22 Episode 20 - Jeff Goldlum creates the character, Vic Ocasek, who does a spoof ad for Rock and Roll Fantasy Camp on Saturday Night Live.
- The Seattle comedy show Almost Live! had a 1994 skit called "Rock Star Fantasy Camp" which featured grunge band stars Dave Grohl, Kim Thayil, and Mike McCready. The skit predated the founding of the real Rock n' Roll fantasy camp by three years.
