= Stand Your Ground (Mike Tramp album) =

Studio album by Mike Tramp
- Released: March 2011
- Genre: Hard rock, melodic rock
- Label: Target Records

Mike Tramp chronology
The Rock 'N' Roll Circuz (2009)	Stand Your Ground (2011)	Cobblestone Street (2013)

Singles from Stand Your Ground
- 1. "The Distance" Released: 2011; 2. "Hymn to Ronnie" Released: 2011

Stand Your Ground is the sixth solo album (and second under the banner of 'Mike Tramp & The Rock 'N' Roll Circuz') by former Freak of Nature and current White Lion lead singer, Mike Tramp.

== Background and recording ==
Released on 28 March 2011, the album was recorded virtually live in Medley Studios in Copenhagen, and co-produced by Søren Andersen and Mike Tramp. It was mixed by Jacob Hansen, known for his work with bands such as Volbeat, Surfact and others.

== Release and promotion ==
The track, "Distance", was released as the first single from the album, which also featured a promo video.

The Danish release of the album contains the bonus track, "Hymn to Ronnie" (also released as a single), which is a tribute to Ronnie James Dio, who died the previous year on 16 May 2010.

== Track listing ==
No.	Title	Length
1.	"Don't Let Them Put It on You"	4:13
2.	"Alright By Me"	3:39
3.	"Distance"	4:06
4.	"Gotta Get Away"	4:14
5.	"Straight from the Look in Your Eyes"	4:51
6.	"Got Me Crazy"	4:32
7.	"Wish You Well"	4:23
8.	"World Is Changing"	5:25
9.	"Prettiest Thing"	4:51
10.	"Say What You Will"	3:56
11.	"The Soldier Never Started a War"	7:00
12.	"Hymn to Ronnie" (Danish only bonus track)	7:21

== Personnel ==
- Mike Tramp – vocals, guitar
- Claus Langeskov – bass guitar
- Søren Andersen – guitar
- Morten Hellborn – drums
- Emily Garriock – keyboards, vocals
