= Remembering White Lion =

Studio album of re-recorded songs by White Lion
- Released: October 5, 1999
- Genres: Glam metal, hard rock
- Length: 64:43
- Label: Cleopatra
- Producer: Mike Tramp

White Lion chronology
The Best of White Lion (1992)	Remembering White Lion (1999)	Rocking the USA (2005)

Singles from Remembering White Lion
- 1. "When the Children Cry 99" Released: 1999

Professional ratings
Review scores
Source	Rating
Allmusic	2/5 stars

Remembering White Lion is an album by White Lion featuring new re-recorded versions of their classic songs from previous studio albums, including the band's biggest three hits: "When the Children Cry", "Wait", and "Little Fighter".

== Background ==
Following three albums as the lead singer of the hard rock band Freak of Nature, Mike Tramp started a solo career releasing his debut album Capricorn in 1998 and also reformed White Lion with all new musicians. The original members left the band following the last White Lion studio album Mane Attraction in 1991 and had no interest in reforming the original band.

To avoid legal issues with former members, the band was known as Tramp's White Lion when this album was re-released in 2004 under the title Last Roar.

== Release ==
The re-recorded "When the Children Cry" was released as a promo and later an iTunes single and was also released on several mixed compilation albums. In 2004, an acoustic version of "When the Children Cry" was recorded and featured on the VH1 Classic Metal Mania: Stripped compilation.

The album has been re-released under different titles and album covers several times, apart from the original 1999 release and the first re release as Last Roar in 2004, there has been several more versions including Ultimate Collection in 2005, The Ultimate White Lion in 2006, Portrait of the Lion in 2009, White Lion Greatest Hits in 2011 and White Lion Compilation in 2012.

== Track listing ==
1. "All the Fallen Men" - 4:45
2. "Warsong" - 5:49
3. "El Salvador" - 4:59
4. "Wait" - 7:00
5. "Little Fighter" - 4:55
6. "When the Children Cry" - 6:18
7. "Fight to Survive" - 6:23
8. "Living on the Edge" - 5:41
9. "She's Got Everything" - 4:26
10. "Lonely Nights" - 4:56
11. "Broken Home" - 5:46
12. "Till Death Do Us Part" - 3:45

== Band members ==
- Mike Tramp - vocals
- Kasper Damgaard - guitar
- Nils Kroyer - bass guitar
- Bjarne T. Holm - drums
- Dan Hemmer - Hammond B-3 organ
