= Marcus Nand =

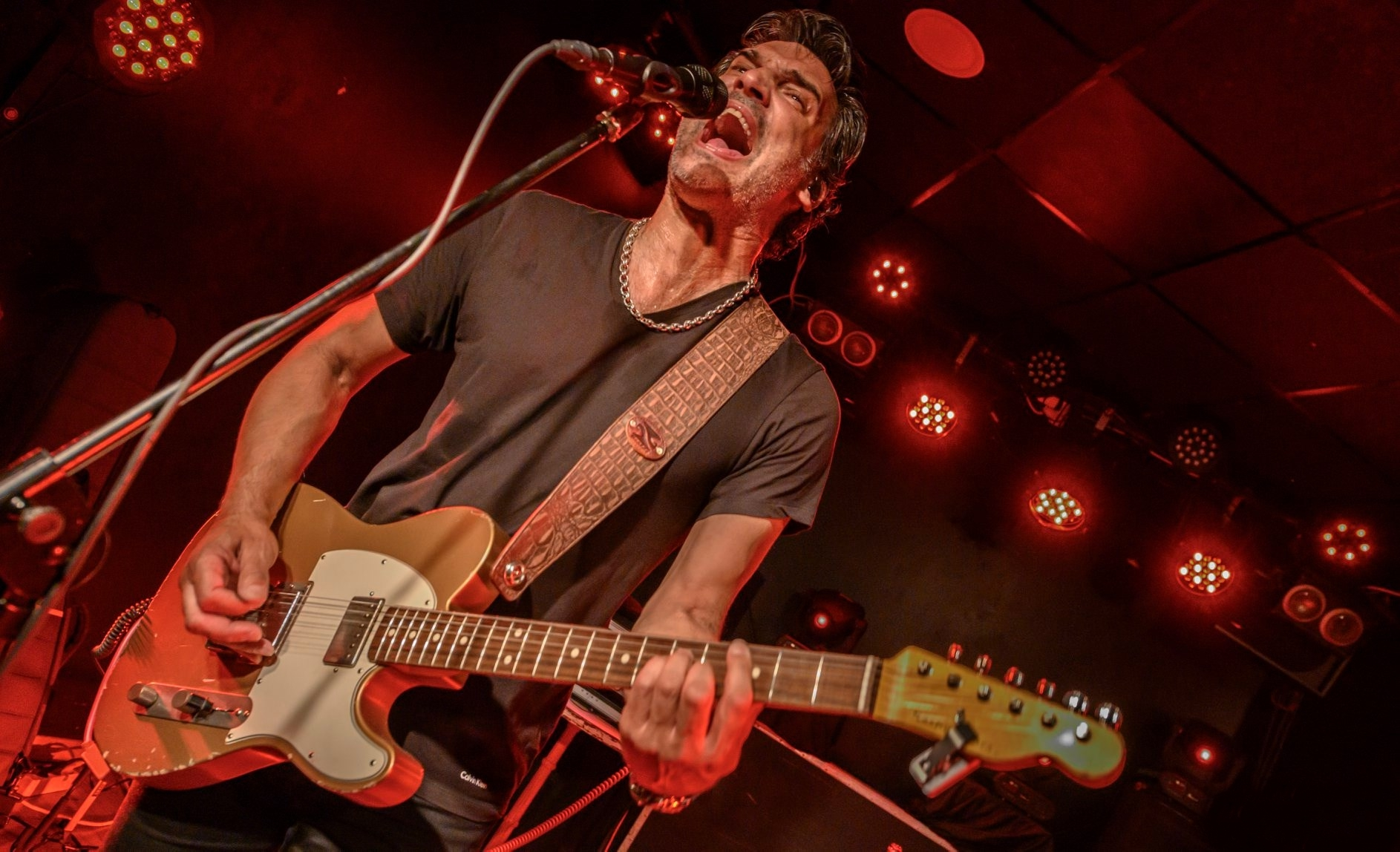

Background information
- Born: Merseyside, England
- Origin: Fuengirola, Spain
- Genres: Rock, pop, World, flamenco, electronic, blues
- Occupations: Musician, singer-songwriter, composer, producer
- Instruments: Guitar, keyboards, vocals, mandolin, oud
- Years active: 1994–present
- Labels: Various: Triloka, Frontiers Records, Artemis Records, Ark 21, Magna Carta Records, etc.
- Member of: The *uckers
- Website: MarcusNand.com

Marcus Nand (born Merseyside, England) is a guitarist, singer-songwriter, producer, and sound engineer best known for his work with flamenco guitar. After learning rock, blues, and flamenco in Spain in his youth, he has been based in Los Angeles since the 1990s. A past guitarist for Los Angeles metal band Freak of Nature, he later formed the world music and rock band Ziroq with bassist Carmine Rojas. Ziroq's debut album was named "Best Mix: Non-Orchestral" at the 2002 Surround Music Awards. Nand also works on various solo projects. As a session guitarist, he has contributed to albums such as Situation Dangerous by Bozzio Levin Stevens, Essential Ballads by Jeff Scott Soto, and various compilations.

== Early life ==
Marcus Nand was born in England and initially raised by his parents in Merseyside. Born into a musical family, his mother is English, while his father is Fiji-born Indian. His father, who had previously been a lightweight champion boxer in Fiji, first bought Nand an acoustic guitar while scouting for work in Spain, and Nand started playing acoustic guitar at age seven. His initial interest was in blues and rock.

When he was eight years old, he moved with his family to Fuengirola, Spain. After attending local gypsy gatherings he began to learn flamenco guitar from local Romani community in Andalucia. About hearing the style for the first time, Nand has stated "It made me feel exactly the same way as when you see a very exciting rock guitarist. There was that same urgency, and weight." He apprenticed with the local flamenco guitarist Sebastian Cortes Reyes. Nand started playing semi-professionally around the province of Málaga at age 12. He debuted with a Spanish heavy metal band at age 14.

== Music career ==
=== Freak of Nature ===
Nand left Spain for Los Angeles in 1990. In 1991, after auditioning for a possible incarnation of Ratt, Nand started writing with Bobby Blotzer and Juan Croucier from Ratt. Demos but no studio releases were recorded. The group again wrote together in 1992, again with no releases. His first job as a sideman was contributing guitar to the album Frederiksen/Phillips, by the late rock singer Fergie Frederiksen and Styx bassist Ricky Phillips. It was released on Empire Records in 1995.

In 1994 he joined Mike Tramp’s heavy metal band Freak of Nature on rhythm guitar, in support of their recent album Gathering of Freaks, which had spent one week at No. 66 on the UK Albums Chart in October 1994. Following the release of the album guitarist Kenny Korade was replaced by Nand and the band undertook a tour of Europe and Scandinavia.

The band disbanded in 1996, though Nand contributed to their next and final album, Outcasts. The November 1998 compilation is a collection of B-sides, demos and outtakes released through Ulftone Records. Most of the tracks had never been released before.

In 1996 he formed KuDeTa with Styx/Bad English/Coverdale Page bassist Ricky Phillips and former Yngwie Malmsteen singer, Jeff Scott Soto. They were centered around a Seal/Sting/Beatles vein, described as "bluesy at times, nostalgic at others, jazzy, and even R&Bish." Despite record company offers there was never a release.

=== Ziroq ===
After touring with Freak of Nature Nand returned to Spain. He moved back to Los Angeles in 1997, forming the band Ziroq with bassist and co-producer Carmine Rojas. The band blends Spanish gypsy music, rock, flamenco, and other Eastern European influences. Nand sang lead vocals in both Spanish and English, also playing guitar, arranging, composing, and producing with members such as Rojas and co-producer Chuck Kentis.

"Ziroq"
Excerpt of the track "Ziroq," showcasing styles as diverse as flamenco and Middle Eastern percussion

In 2001 the band released the full-length album Ziroq. David Beamish of DVDActive stated that Nand's voice give the songs a "softer and warmer" sound, and he praised the "fiery, passionate performances" and a "soothing flamenco and Latin American guitar sound." A review by Mark Schwartz stated, "On their self-titled debut, Middle Eastern percussion, violin, and flamenco guitars take the fore, in counterpoint to Nand's smoky vocals. While The Gipsy Kings...may be more of the leather-clad, rock 'n' roll variety as opposed to the Spanish brand, Nand and Ziroq know the bare-chested secret of this seductive, atmospheric music, and they aren't shy about sharing it."

In support of the album the band performed throughout the west coast, appearing at the Whole Earth Festival in April 2002. The band also released a Ziroq DVD, which includes a music video for the track "Cerca de Mi" and video of live performances. The album was named "Best Mix: Non-Orchestral" at the 2002 Surround Music Awards. It was re-released on Razor & Tie Records on 9 April 2002.

The 2002 Putamayo World Music compilation Rumba Flamenco, to which he contributed the Ziroq track "Que Pena," peaked at No. 11 on the Tropical/Salsa chart at Billboard. The following year the title track "Ziroq" was included on the George V Records compilation Siddharta: Spirit of Buddha Bar. The track "Tierra del Sur" from the album was then included in the 2006 compilation Rhythm of the Earth, on Artemis Records.

=== Other work and projects ===
Since the 1990s Nand has worked as a musician, composer, and music programmer. After contributing guitar to Frederiksen/Phillips in 1995, several years later he contributed guitar to the Frederiksen album Equilibrium, released in Germany in 1999. Equilibrium also featured artists like Neal Schon, Steve Porcaro, Jason Scheff, and Dave Amato.

Nand then contributed guitar to a track on the 2000 album Situation Dangerous by the supergroup Bozzio Levin Stevens. Released on Magna Carta Records, the album incorporates rock, fusion, jazz and instrumental classical music, consisting of drummer Terry Bozzio, bassist Tony Levin and guitarist Steve Stevens.

He had a number of promotional radio broadcasts with Steve Stevens in support of Stevens' Flamenco A-Go-Go album in 2000. He also had a solo performance at Royal Albert Hall in support of Save the Children, along with Diego El Cigala, Dorantes and Joaquin Gril.

2001 saw Nand play flamenco guitar on the Shani album Call of the Wild, released on Ark 21. That year Nand formed Elements of Friction with Rick Phillips, Tommy Aldridge and Robin McCauley. Nand played guitar on their singular eponymous album, released on MTM Music Munchen in Germany. Elements of Friction had been started after Nand and Ricky Phillips met and began playing and writing music together, with members such as Tommy Aldridge joining later.

Nand played Flamenco guitar on the 2002 compilation Desert Roses and Arabian Rhythms, Vol. 2, released on Mondo Melodia/Ark 21. He also contributed guitar to the album of his friend, guitarist Kike G Caamaño, who released Civilized Stress in 2003 under the group name Asha. Civilized Stress was voted album of the month in Kerrang! and Asha was voted as the Best Foreign Band in the Scandinavian "Monster Magazine" in 2004. Nand also contributed to Caamaño's following album Gallery of Thoughts, released in 2008 which won the "Creativity in Rock" prize awarded by National Spanish Radio 3 (RNE).

In 2006 he contributed guitar to the metal compilation Essential Ballads, released by rock singer Jeff Scott Soto of Journey. He was the primary artist on the track "Rumba" on the compilation Guitar Masters, Vol. 1, released on BHP Music in 2007. Other artists on the album include Jeff Beck, John Paul Jones, Joe Satriani, and Allan Holdsworth.

In 2009, he was the primary artist on the track "Vuelve María" on the album Unidad de Canciones Intensivas by Jaime Roldán. In a world music project also incorporating Mexican-influenced music, Nand worked on the Desconocido EPK, which was Roldán produced and helped write. Nand produced the album Bridger by Bridger in 2011 on Escape Music, also playing guitar, keyboards, and handling the drum and keyboard programming. Bridger is the solo project by Glen Bridger, the guitarist for Head East, a classic rock band. Nand played guitar on the 2012 Juego De Valientes by Argentinian singer-songwriter Diego Verdaguer, which included contributions by Amanda Miguel.

Marcus Nand frequently performs live, and for a time played shows as part of the Marcus Nand Group.

In 2022, Nand joined Mike Tramp for an acoustic tour highlighting songs from Tramp's earlier band White Lion.

In 2023, Nand played on Mike Tramp's "Songs Of White Lion" album and toured to support the record.

== Style, equipment ==
As a guitarist and vocalist, Nand frequently incorporates the musical styles of World music, flamenco, rock, dance, chillout, and blues. He uses guitars by a number of companies, notably a Fender Stratocaster, a Gibson Les Paul, and several Godin models. He's also been known to use a Danelectro baritone guitar, an Epiphone mandolin, a Turkish oud, a Takamine nylon string guitar, and flamenco guitars by Candelas and Victor Manuel Diaz. He records and produces on Cubase.

== Personal life ==
Nand continues to be based in Los Angeles, regularly travelling to visit his family in Fuengirola, Spain.

== Discography ==
=== With Ziroq ===
List of studio and live albums by Ziroq
Year	Album title	Release details
2001	Ziroq	Released: 22 May 2001 / 9 April 2002; Label: Triloka Records / Razor & Tie; Format: CD, digital, DVD

Compilations with Ziroq tracks

- 2002: Rumba Flamenco (Putamayo) – track "Que Pena"
- 2003: Siddharta: Spirit of Buddha Bar (George V Records) – track "Ziroq"
- 2006: Rhythm of the Earth (Artemis Records/Triloka) – track "Tierra del Sur"

Music videos

- 2001: "Cerca de Mi"

=== Solo material ===
Incomplete list of songs by Marcus Nand
Year	Title	Album	Label
2007	"Rumba"	Guitar Masters, Vol. 1	BHP Music
2009	"Vuelve María" (feat. Jaime Roldán)	Unidad de Canciones Intensivas	Canciones en Busca de Artistas
2014	"Eyes of the World"	Single only	Self-released
2014	"Perfect World"	Single only	Self-released

=== Performance credits ===
Incomplete list of credits for Marcus Nand
Yr	Release title	Primary artist(s)	Label	Notes, role
1994	Gathering of Freaks	Freak of Nature	Music For Nations	Rhythm guitar (on tour)
1995	Frederiksen/Phillips	Fergie Frederiksen, Ricky Phillips	Empire Records (Sweden)	Guitar
1998	Outcasts	Freak of Nature	Ulftone Records	Rhythm guitar
1999	Equilibrium	Fergie Frederiksen	MTM Music (Germany)	Guitar
2000	Situation Dangerous	Bozzio Levin Stevens	Magna Carta	Additional guitar (track 7)
2001	Call of the Wild	Shani	Ark 21	Flamenco guitar
2001	Elements of Friction	Elements of Friction	MTM Music Munchen	Electric and flamenco guitars
2002	Desert Roses and Arabian Rhythms, Vol. 2	Various	Ark 21/Mondo Melodia	Flamenco guitar
2003	Civilized Stress	Asha	Eagle Pass & Co./Blue Dolphin	Bass guitar
2006	Hipokrisia	Tyr	Background Noise	Flamenco guitar
2006	Essential Ballads	Jeff Scott Soto	Frontiers	Guitar
2007	Guitar Masters, Vol. 1	Various	BHP Music	Primary artist on track "Rumba"
2008	Gallery of Thoughts	Asha	Eagle Pass & Co./Blue Dolphin	Bass guitar
2009	Unidad de Canciones Intensivas	Jaime Roldán	Canciones en Busca de Artistas	Primary artist on track "Vuelve María"
2010	Noches de Mala Vida	Calé	Calé	Producer, electric guitar, vocals
2011	Bridger	Bridger	Escape Music	Guitar, keyboards, producer, programming (drums, keyboard, loops)
2012	Juego De Valientes	Diego Verdaguer		Flamenco guitar
