= The *uckers =

Heavy metal band founded by William Shatner

- Genre: Heavy metal
- Years active: 2026–present
- Label: Cleopatra
- Members: William Shatner; Marcus Nand; Britt Lightning; Phil Soussan; Fred Achin

The *uckers are a heavy metal band formed in 2026. They comprise lead singer William Shatner, guitarists Marcus Nand and Britt Lightning, bassist Phil Soussan, and drummer Fred Achin.

== History ==
In an interview, Shatner said that the band started after he recorded a one-off spoken-word intro piece for former Megadeth guitarist Chris Poland. Shatner found the experience so inspiring that he set out to create a metal band of his own.

The band made their first public debut on September 19, 2026, as part of Riot Fest 2026, performing on the Rebel Stage. During an interview with CNN, Shatner accidentally leaked that The *uckers would be playing at Coachella 2027, with his daughter Melanie later confirming the festival he was talking about was Coachella.

== Discography ==
Studio albums

- What the F is Heavy Metal? (2026)
