= Museum (Mike Tramp album) =

Studio album by Mike Tramp
- Released: August 18, 2014
- Recorded: 2013
- Genre: Soft rock, melodic rock, folk music
- Label: Target Records

Mike Tramp chronology
Cobblestone Street (2013)	Museum (2014)	Nomad (2015)

Singles from Museum
- 1. "Trust in Yourself" Released: 2014; 2. "Freedom" Released: 2014

Museum is the eighth solo album by former White Lion and Freak of Nature lead singer, Mike Tramp, released August 18, 2014 on Target Records.

== Background and recording ==
The album picks up where Tramp's last album, 2013's Cobblestone Street left off, following his new-found, back-to-the-roots direction. Tramp recorded the new acoustic folk style soft rock album at Medley Studio, Copenhagen-Denmark with engineer/co-producer/multi-instrumentalist Soren Andersen.

== Release and promotion ==
The album reached number three on Denmark's official top 40 hitlist albums chart. The first single, "Trust in Yourself", features a music video directed by his son Dylan. The song "Freedom" was released as the second single of the album.

As part of the release, Tramp gave no less than four release concerts at the newly opened Zeppelin Bar, Café and Venue in Copenhagen. The four concerts took place from August 14 to 17. All the concerts were completely sold out. Tramp delivered outstanding performances with special themes and different set lists every night to a dedicated crowd. Directly after the release Tramp commenced a European tour.

== Reception ==
Museum has generally received positive reviews. CrypticRock give Museum 4 out of 5 stars, calling it "a classic soft rock, acoustic guitar album, it has timelessness as it could just as easily been written in any of the last five decades. The vocals are rich and warm, and it is easy to imagine sitting around a beach campfire listening to Tramp strumming his guitar while lamenting on the corporate nature of the music business and the daily trials and tribulations he encounters. Tramp made his name in a hair metal band, White Lion were certainly a corporate controlled machine in the 80's but here he has broken free and he must feel very proud of where he has arrived at today."

== Track listing ==
No.	Title	Length
1.	"Trust in Yourself"	5:07
2.	"New World Coming"	4:38
3.	"Down South"	4:05
4.	"Better"	4:23
5.	"Freedom"	4:17
6.	"Commitment"	4:12
7.	"And You Were Gone"	4:06
8.	"Slave"	3:52
9.	"Mother"	4:01
10.	"Time for Me to Go"	5:20

== Personnel ==
- Mike Tramp – vocals, acoustic guitar
- Søren Andersen – guitar, piano, bass guitar, drums

== Charts ==
Chart (2014)	Peak position
Danish Albums	3
