= Capricorn (Mike Tramp album) =

Studio album by Mike Tramp
- Released: October 17, 1997 (France), February 10, 1998 (North America)
- Recorded: 1997
- Genres: Hard rock, melodic rock
- Length: 41:40
- Label: CNR Music
- Producer: Mike Tramp

Mike Tramp chronology
Capricorn (1997)	Recovering the Wasted Years (2002)

Singles from Capricorn
- 1. "Better Off" Released: 1997; 2. "Already Gone" Released: 1997; 3. "If I Live Tomorrow" Released: 1998; 4. "Take a Little Time EP" Released: 1998

Capricorn is the debut solo album by former White Lion and Freak of Nature lead singer, Mike Tramp.

First released in France on the CNR Music label on October 17, 1997, the album was subsequently given a much wider distribution with the North American release on February 10, 1998, through CMC International, at which point Tramp commenced a solo tour in support of it. The album was also picked up in Britain by Music for Nations.

== Background ==
Tramp started working on the album following the split of Freak of Nature and the album features former Freak of Nature bandmates, guitarist Kenny Korade and bass player Jerry Best. Former White Lion bass guitarist James LoMenzo performed backing vocals on the album.

== Release and promotion ==
The song "Better Off" was released as Tramp's debut solo single and features his first solo music video. "Already Gone" was also released as a single for the album and "If I Live Tomorrow" was released as a promo single. "Take a Little Time" was released as an EP/Single titled "Leftovers" which included "Fears of Yesterday" and "Just a Dream" as B-sides.

Following the albums release Tramp reformed White Lion with all new musicians releasing the album Remembering White Lion. Tramp also moved to Australia, with the aim of raising his son away from the rigors of big city life and to plan his next career move.

== Track listing ==
No.	Title	Length
1.	"Already Gone"	3:49
2.	"If I Live Tomorrow"	3:36
3.	"Here I Don't Belong"	4:48
4.	"Heart of Every Woman"	4:18
5.	"Have You Ever"	4:17
6.	"Better Off"	3:52
7.	"Had I Not Complained"	4:15
8.	"Running Out of Life"	3:04
9.	"Wait Not for Me"	4:57
10.	"Love Will Come and Go"	4:21
11.	"Take a Little Time"	5:07
12.	"Fears of Yesterday"	4:17
13.	"Ain't Ready to Let You Go"	5:12
14.	"Just a Dream"	4:47

== Credits ==
- Mike Tramp – vocals, electric guitar, acoustic guitar
- Kenny Korade – guitar
- Jerry Best – bass guitar
- Dorian Crozier – drums
- Kim Bullard – Hammond organ
- James LoMenzo – backing vocals
