= Cobblestone Street =

Studio album by Mike Tramp
- Released: April 8, 2013
- Recorded: 2012
- Genre: Soft rock, melodic rock, folk music
- Label: Cleopatra Records

Mike Tramp chronology
Stand Your Ground (2011)	Cobblestone Street (2013)	Museum (2014)

Singles from Cobblestone Street
- 1. "New Day" Released: 2013; 2. "Revolution" Released: 2013

Cobblestone Street is the seventh solo album by former White Lion and Freak of Nature lead singer, Mike Tramp, released April 8, 2013.

== Background and recording ==
Following a successful acoustic tour of Europe in 2012, Tramp recorded the new acoustic folk style rock album at Medley Studio, Copenhagen-Denmark in the summer of 2012, with his good friend engineer/Co-producer and multi-instrumentalist Soren Andersen. Originally, the plan was to release it as double album, but Tramp later changed his mind.

== Release and promotion ==
The album charted at Denmark's official top 40 hitlist albums' at number 21 and features the first single "New Day" which was released on February 18, 2013. The track "Revolution" was released as the second single and the album's title track features an acoustic music video.

The album also features three acoustic bonus tracks including the White Lion classic "When the Children Cry", "'92" which is from Tramp's former band Freak of Nature and the solo title track from 2003's More to Life Than This.

Tramp will commence a world tour in support of the album starting in Europe and will be supporting Beth Hart during several concerts in France.

== Reception ==
Cobblestone Street generally received positive reviews. The album was praised by Sea of Tranquility reviewer Murat Batmaz. Noted Batmaz: "Tramp is no longer in his late-20s; he has matured and grown as an artist. On Cobblestone Street, he writes about his hometown, his childhood, and his dreams. The music is driven by his vocals, with the strummed acoustic guitars supporting, rather than creating, the melodies." Batmaz also emphasized his liking for the more "personal" songs such as "Ain't the Life I Asked for," which he defined as "documenting Tramp's life" and praised Tramp for "chanel[ling] his heart and soul into the mix." Hard Rock Haven reviewer Derric Miller praised the album's stripped-down format and Tramp's "unique vocals" drawing comparisons to Bruce Springsteen and Bob Dylan. Metal Excess described the album as "mellow and sentimental" and urged its readers to "seek [the album] out." Eurovisionary awarded the album five stars and recommended the album to both adults and teenagers alike, saying: "this album is not only for the grown ups, even though they can relate to many of the problematic topics addressed on the album. If you want to hear a real rock ‘n' roll voice this is it."

== Track listing ==
No.	Title	Length
1.	"Cobblestone Street"	4:25
2.	"Caught in the Storm"	4:19
3.	"New Day"	3:32
4.	"Ain't the Life I Asked For"	4:40
5.	"Revolution"	3:54
6.	"We'll Be Alright"	3:59
7.	"Angel Or Devil"	4:49
8.	"Find It in Your Heart"	3:39
9.	"What Are You Gonna Do"	5:10
10.	"Once"	4:03
11.	"When the Children Cry (2013 Acoustic Version)" (US bonus track)	4:52
12.	"'92 (2013 Acoustic Version)" (European digipak bonus track)
13.	"More to Life Than This (2013 Acoustic Version)" (European digipak bonus track)

== Personnel ==
- Mike Tramp – vocals, acoustic guitar
- Søren Andersen – guitar, piano, bass guitar, drums

== Charts ==
Chart (2013)	Peak position
Danish Albums	21
