= Freak of Nature (band) =

American rock band

Background information
- Genres: Hard rock, heavy metal, alternative rock
- Years active: 1992–1998
- Labels: Music for Nations, Ulftone
- Past members: Mike Tramp; Dennis Chick; Kenny Korade; Jerry Best; Johnny Haro; Oliver Steffensen; Marcus Nand

Freak of Nature was an American hard rock band formed in 1992 by former White Lion co-founder/vocalist, Danish singer Mike Tramp. The band was formed after White Lion broke up and the follow-up was significantly darker and harder than White Lion. The band released three albums and then broke up in 1998. Following Freak of Nature, Mike Tramp released several solo albums and also reformed White Lion with a new lineup.

== History ==
=== Formation ===
In September 1991, just days after White Lion played their last gig, Mike Tramp met up with longtime friend Oliver Steffensen who was an original member of the pre-White Lion band Danish Lions. The pair spent weeks in Tramp's house in Santa Monica, California, resulting in several songs which were later released under the moniker "Mike and Oliver". The album was titled Brothers for Life and was Tramp's progression from White Lion to Freak of Nature. Three songs from the same sessions later ended up on Freak of Nature's debut album. Ex-Lion bassist Jerry Best joined the pair shortly after, as did ex-Strike Twice guitarist Kenny Korade. The band used programmed drums and another drummer up until drummer Johnny Haro joined the newly-formed band. After six months of rehearsals, Tramp and Steffensen had an argument resulting in Steffensen leaving the band to return to Denmark. In 1992, ex-House of Lords guitarist Dennis Chick was brought in to replace Steffensen, and the band was finally official.

=== Rise and fall ===
In November 1992, the band entered the Record Plant in Sausalito, California, to record their self-titled debut album, and although the record, released in 1993 through Music for Nations, did not shift in large quantities, Freak of Nature's relentless work ethic brought in many admirers. "Rescue Me" was released as the band's debut single and "Turn the Other Way" was also released as a promo single. Both singles featured music videos. In 1993, Freak of Nature toured for eight months, playing a mixture of headlining shows, mainly in Britain, including gigs at the Roskilde Festival on July 2 and support slots for Helloween in September and Dio in November.

Early in 1994, Korade said he wanted to leave the band and both Best and Haro indicated likewise. Tramp managed to talk Best and Haro into staying, but Korade only agreed to stay through the recording of the band's second album. Gathering of Freaks was released in 1994 and shortly after the recording processes in Canoga Park and North Hollywood, California, Korade was replaced by Marcus Nand. The album spent one week at No. 66 on the UK Albums Chart in October 1994 which was the band's only UK chart presence. The album included the single "Enemy" which featured a music video. Sea of Tranquility reviewer Murat Batmaz gave the album a glowing review, calling it perhaps Mike Tramp's greatest vocal performance with his darkest songwriting vision.

The band undertook a tour in support of the album and then eventually disbanded. In 1998, an album of outtakes, demos and rarities titled Outcasts was released.

=== Post-split ===
Tramp moved to Australia and between 1998 and 2004 released four studio albums and one live album as a solo artist: Capricorn, Recovering the Wasted Years, More to Life Than This, and Songs I Left Behind as studio efforts, with Rock 'N' Roll Alive as a live album. Tramp also reformed White Lion with a new line-up under the name "Tramp's White Lion" (TWL; aka White Lion II) due to legal issues with former members. The band played and re-recorded White Lion songs. TWL toured during 2005 and released a double-live CD entitled Rocking the USA. In 2007, a White Lion compilation, The Definitive Rock Collection, was released and the band was set for a summer tour with Poison and Ratt, only to be dropped by the tour promoter after ex-White Lion guitarist Vito Bratta threatened to take legal action over the band name. Eventually, Tramp was able to use the White Lion name and they released Return of the Pride in 2008.

Korade returned to play on Tramp's solo album Capricorn in 1997. Korade formed a band called Zero G, which at one point also included both Best and Haro. Korade later joined Courtney Love's touring band.

Best played bass for Dio between August 1995 and May 1996, taking part in recording sessions and a South American tour. He also stayed for the pre-production on Dio's Angry Machines album, co-writing some of the songs. He also played on Tramp's solo album Capricorn and the tour that followed. He was also part of Courtney Love's band for a couple of years, co-writing seven of the twelve songs on America's Sweetheart. He also played on the White Lion US tour in July 2007.

Haro was in the band Star 69 in 1996 and 1997, playing on their last album Eating February. He went on to a brief stint in Stabbing Westward, filling in for their drummer on tour in 1998. A couple of months later, Haro joined Econoline Crush, where he stayed until the band's breakup in 2001. In 2002, he teamed up with ex-Stabbing Westward singer Christopher Hall and formed The Dreaming.

Steffensen formed the band Spacehead and released an album. Later, an album called Brothers for Life was released under the moniker Mike & Oliver containing pre-Freak of Nature material. Steffensen also was part of Tramp's solo albums Recovering the Wasted Years and More to Life Than This and also played with Tramp during his European tour in 2003.

Dennis Chick runs a custom motorcycle shop in Los Angeles.

Nand moved back to Málaga, Spain, where he grew up. He later returned to Los Angeles, where he worked both solo and with other musicians.

In 2014, Tramp stated that a Freak of Nature reunion would only be possible with the original members.

== Discography ==
=== Albums ===
- Freak of Nature (1993) – catalogue number: MFN146 – produced Freak of Nature and Phil Kaffel
- Gathering of Freaks (1994) – catalogue number: MFN169 – produced by Kaffel

=== Compilation albums ===
- Outcasts – compilation album of demos and outtakes (1998)
- Freakthology – limited edition box set featuring all three albums (2003)

=== Singles and EPs ===
- "Rescue Me" – catalogue number: KUT153 (Europe only)
1. "Rescue Me" (1993)
2. "Are You Ready"
3. "Turn the Other Way" (acoustic)
4. "What Am I" (acoustic)
- "Rescue Me" – catalogue number: VICP2091 (Japan only)
1. "Rescue Me"
2. "What Am I" (acoustic)
3. "Turn the Other Way" (acoustic)
4. "Wartime"
5. "Can't Find My Way"
- "Turn the Other Way" (promo single)
- "Enemy" (promo single)

=== DVDs ===
- Live in Japan 1993 – (2004)
1. "Turn the Other Way"
2. "People"
3. "World Doesn't Mind"
4. "Rescue Me"
5. "Possessed"
6. "Are You Ready"
7. "'92"
8. "What Am I"
9. "If I Leave"
10. "Bad Reputation"
11. "What Am I"
12. "Love Was Here"
13. "What Am I" †
14. "If I Leave" †
15. "Ohio" †

† Bonus footage: Freak of Nature Unplugged in France (1993)

=== Other albums ===
- Brothers for Life (Mike & Oliver) – pre-Freak of Nature album
