= Maxidrom =

International musical festival in Russia

- Genre: Rock Music
- Location: Russia
- Years active: 1995-2016
- Founders: Radio Maximum
- Website: http://maxidrom.ru/

Maxidrom (Russian: Максидром) was an annual international musical festival organized by Radio Maximum station.

== History ==
Year	Date	Participants	Headliners
1995	13 May	Agatha Christie, Bravo, Va-Bank, Moralny codex, Garik Sukachov, Nogu Svelo!, Serga, Chaif, Chizh & Co	Agatha Christie, Bravo
1997	24 May	Green Grey, Tequilajazzz, X-ROUDZ, Alisa, Agatha Christie, Bravo, Va-Bank, Gelios, Ivan Kupala, Ivan-Kayf, Mango-Mango, Megapolis, Mechtat', Moralny codex, Garik Sukachov, Nogu Svelo!, Serga, Chaif, Chizh & Co, Svincovyy Tuman, Splean	—
1998	23 May	EGO, Tequilajazzz, Agatha Christie, Alisa, Bekhan, Bravo, Va-Bank, Vopli Vidopliassova, Lyapis Trubetskoy, Masha i Medvedi, Mumiy Troll, Tarakany!, Garik Sukachov, Nogu Svelo!, Splean	—
1999	23 May	I.F.K., Agatha Christie, Aquarium, Alisa, Amega, Bekhan, Biplan, Vopli Vidopliassova, Zemfira, Mesto Vstrechi, Mashina Vremeni, Krematorij, Nogu Svelo!, Okean Elzy, Pilot, Tancy Minus, Splean, Chaif	—
2000	20 May	Mumiy Troll, Bi-2, Masha i Medvedi, Voskreseniye, Tantsy Minus, Zdob si Zdub, Nogu Svelo!, Nike Borzov, Chaif, Vopli Vidopliassova, Splean, Krematorij, Okean Elzy, Zemfira	—
2001	19 May	Splean, Bi-2, Vyacheslav Butusov, Deadushki, Chaif, Zdob si Zdub, Nike Borzov, Alisa, Nochniye Snaiperi, Smyslovye Gallyutsinatsii, Okean Elzy, Total, Tantsy Minus, Konets Filma, Agatha Christie, Zhanna Aguzarova	—
2002	19 May	Zemfira, Mumiy Troll, Vopli Vidopliassova, Okean Elzy, Nike Borzov, Smyslovye Gallyutsinatsii, Total, Nochniye Snaiperi, Brainstorm, 7B, Butch, Multfilmy, Segodnya Nochyu	Mumiy Troll
2003	17 May	Apocalyptica, HIM, Chumbawamba, Tantsy Minus, Splean, Bi-2, Nike Borzov, Dolphin, Tokio, Moral Code X	HIM
2004	18 June	Placebo, Reamonn, Bi-2, Brainstorm, Dolphin, Linda, Zemfira, Mumiy Troll, Nochniye Snaiperi, Splean, Tantsy Minus, Hooverphonic	Placebo
2005	21 May	Franz Ferdinand, The Servant, Thirteen Senses, Bratya Grim, Oleg Chubykin, Linda, Zemfira, Mumiy Troll, Okean Elzy	Franz Ferdinand
2006	10 June	Brainstorm, Fools Garden, IAMX, Pete Murray, The Cardigans, Bi-2, Dolphin, Okean Elzy, Tantsy Minus	The Cardigans
2007	25 May	Placebo, Splean, Tokio, Esthetic Education, GDR	Placebo
2008	14 June	Lenny Kravitz, Bi-2, Brainstorm, Dolphin, Noize MC, BoomBox	Lenny Kravitz
2011	28 May	Korn, The Prodigy, Brainstorm, Adam Lambert, Travis, Zemfira	Korn, The Prodigy
2012	10 June	Linkin Park, The Rasmus, Clawfinger, Therapy?, Biting Elbows	Linkin Park
2012	11 June	The Cure, Everlast, Noel Gallagher's High Flying Birds, She Wants Revenge, Everything is made in China	The Cure
2013	12 June	Thirty Seconds to Mars, HIM, Simple Plan, Therr Maitz, BLAST, Kopengagen	Thirty Seconds to Mars
