= Nashestvie =

Rock music festival in Russia

Nashestvie Нашествие
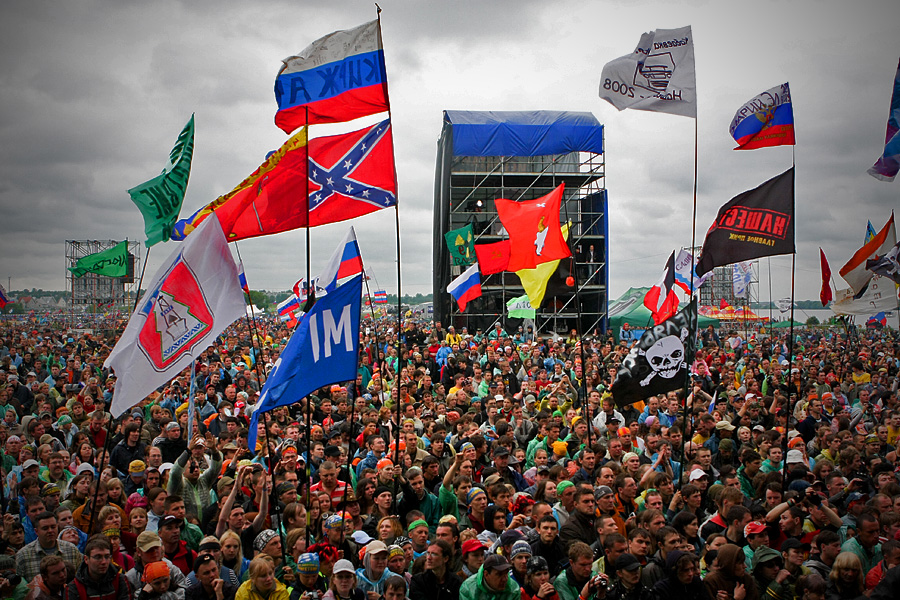
- Hundred of thousands Russian rockers waving National flag, Jolly Roger and Confederate flag at Nashestvie-2008. The flags of Mordovia and Udmurtia are also visible.
- Genre: Russian rock
- Location: Russia
- Years active: 1999-2019
- Founders: Nashe Radio
- Website: http://nashestvie.ru/

Nashestvie (Russian: Нашествие) was the largest open-air festival of Russian rock, organized by Nashe Radio station. It was held annually during the first weekend of July (first weekend of August until 2006) in the environs of Moscow, Russia, since 1999 and has been open air since 2000. Nashestvie has changed its venue several times: it was initially held in Ramenskoye, Moscow Oblast, but recently it moved northwest to Tver Oblast. It was held each year since then until 2019 (except in 2007, when an unofficial replacement festival was held instead). Since 2020 Nashestvie is being regularly banned by the Russian authorities.

The festival's name is a word play in Russian: it literally means "invasion", but is also derived from the name of Nashe Radio (Our Radio). Media also dubbed it "Russian Woodstock".

== Format ==
Nashestvie is participated in by the majority of Russia's most popular rock artists (such as Aria, Alisa, Agatha Christie, Splean, Korol i Shut), as well as bands from Ukraine and Belarus, such as Okean Elzy or Lyapis Trubetskoy. Most of the headliners represent the usual Nashe Radio playlist.

Bands are not paid for participating in Nashestvie (unlike those participating in the rival Krylya Festival). Instead, the festival is used as a free promotion for them. Young and obscure bands can participate in Nashestvie; they play in the mornings or, since 2005, on special separate stages. Some bands, namely Epidemia and Melnitsa, which begun their Nashestvie history in "genre ghettos", recently started to play on the main stage.

== History ==
Year	Date and venue	Audience	Notes	Headliners
Nashestvie-1999	10-11 December, Gorbunov Palace of Culture, Moscow	10,000	The first festival was the only one to be held indoors, excluding Nashestvie-2003 which was held virtually.	Bi-2, Zemfira, Okean Elzy, Zdob si Zdub, Linda
Nashestvie-2000	19-20 August, Ramenskoye Hippodrome, Moscow Oblast	60,000	First of the classical open-air Nashestvies.	Agatha Christie, Korol i Shut, Bi-2, Zemfira, Leningrad, Lyapis Trubetskoy, Tarakany!, Kirpichi
Nashestvie-2001	4-5 August, Ramenskoe Hippodrome, Moscow Oblast	100,000 to 120,000		Aria, Korol i Shut, Splean, Bi-2, Leningrad, Nogu Svelo!, Nochniye Snaiperi
Nashestvie-2002	10-11 August, Ramenskoe Hippodrome, Moscow Oblast	180,000		Aria, Korol i Shut, Aquarium, Agatha Christie, Splean, Nogu Svelo!, Bi-2, Zemfira, Dolphin, Piknik
Nashestvie-2003	2-3 August, Moscow, Nashe Radio studio	Radio audience	The open air performance was cancelled after terrorist attacks at the Krylya Festival the same year. Instead, it was held virtually with bands performing live on air in the Nashe Radio studio.	Mashina Vremeni, Aria, Agatha Christie, Splean, Nogu Svelo!, Bi-2, Zemfira, Dolphin, Leningrad.
Nashestvie-2004	7-8 August, Emmaus, Tver Oblast	50,000	New venue in Tver suburbs, farther from Moscow. It hosted Nashestvie for several years.	Nautilus Pompilius (special one-concert reunion), Aria, Bravo, Splean, Nogu Svelo!, Bi-2, Zemfira, Okean Elzy, Mumiy Troll, Epidemia, Mara
Nashestvie-2005	5-7 August, Emmaus, Tver Oblast	53,000	First Nashestvie to last for three days. Three stages were built, and performance continued simultaneously. The major stage was for mainstream classic rock, the second for punk and heavy metal bands, and the third for "unconventional" genres such as reggae, ska, and folk.	Alisa, Korol i Shut, Agatha Christie, Kipelov, DDT, Splean, Nogu Svelo!, Bi-2, Zemfira, Dolphin, Leningrad, Lyapis Trubetskoy, Melnitsa, Amatory, Mara.
Nashestvie-2006	4-6 August, Sredizemny Mys near Ryazan, Ryazan Oblast	100,000	During this year, the festival split into the official Nashestvie in Ryazan, and the rival Emmaus Festival, held on the same site in Tver Oblast as in 2004-05, but without Nashe Radio's promotion.	Aria, Alisa, Korol i Shut, Agatha Christie, Splean, Nogu Svelo!, Bi-2, Melnitsa, Bravo, Lyapis Trubetskoy, Okean Elzy, Epidemia, Amatory.
Nashestvie-2007 was cancelled because due to a conflict over organisational problems between Nashe and the Ryazan Oblast administration. Emmaus Festival was held on the old venue without a Nashe license, attracting 40,000 and featuring Aria, Alisa, Agatha Christie, Chaif.
Nashestvie-2008	4-6 July, Emmaus, Tver Oblast	100,000	Nashestvie and Emmaus Festival reunited again under the name of Nashestvie. This particular festival received much criticism. It rained during performances, and the field was not prepared for heavy rain, which resulted in areas of wet mud. After this the Emmaus venue was finally abandoned by the festivals.	Aria, Alisa, DDT, Korol i Shut, Agatha Christie, Splean, Bi-2, Bravo, Lyapis Trubetskoy, Epidemia.
Nashestvie-2009	10-12 July, Bolshoe Zavidovo, Tver Oblast	80,000 to 100,000	The festival moved to a larger venue several kilometres southeast from Emmaus, due to the number of visitors.	Alisa, Kipelov, Korol i Shut, Splean, Melnitsa, Mumiy Troll, Bravo, Lyapis Trubetskoy, Piknik, Flëur
Nashestvie-2010	9-11 July, Bolshoe Zavidovo, Tver Oblast	130,000		Aria, Alisa, Korol i Shut, DDT, Agatha Christie, Splean, Nogu Svelo!, Okean Elzi, Lyapis Trubetskoy, Melnitsa, Epidemia.
Nashestvie-2011	8-10 July, Bolshoe Zavidovo, Tver Oblast	173,000	Also broadcast live via internet. Festival featured an additional "theatrical scene", where standup artists performed, among them Mikhail Yefremov and Ivan Okhlobystin.	Aria, Alisa, Korol i Shut, DDT, Splean, Okean Elzi, Lyapis Trubetskoy, Epidemia.
Nashestvie-2012	6-8 July, Bolshoe Zavidovo, Tver Oblast	125,000	Also featured a "non-format" scene with varied music and more obscure bands, such as Troll Gneot Yel and Ivan Kupala	Alisa, DDT, Korol i Shut, Splean
Nashestvie-2013	5-7 July, Bolshoe Zavidovo, Tver Oblast	150,000	Introduced "Nashe 2.0" scene. Also featured an air show.	Alisa, Aria, Bi-2, Kipelov, Korol i Shut, Melnitsa, Splean
Nashestvie-2014	4—6 July, Bolshoe Zavidovo, Tver Oblast	165,000		Alisa, Bi-2, DDT, Kipelov, Mashina Vremeni, Melnitsa, Splean
Nashestvie-2015	3—5 July, Bolshoe Zavidovo, Tver Oblast	around 200,000	Was also broadcast by REN TV	Alisa, Bi-2, Kipelov, Melnitsa, Piknik, Splean
Nashestvie Kazakhstan	29 August 2015, Almaty	unknown		DDT, Kipelov, Pilot
Nashestvie-2016	8—10 July, Bolshoe Zavidovo, Tver Oblast	205,000	Nashestvie's record audience size to date. Was also broadcast by REN TV.	Bi-2, DDT, Kipelov, Leningrad, Melnitsa, Splean
Nashestvie-2017	6—9 July, Bolshoe Zavidovo, Tver Oblast	around 200,000	Was also broadcast by REN TV. This year was criticized for muddy conditions and troubled organization, as the venue was unprepared for heavy rain.	Alisa, DDT, Kipelov, Melnitsa, Piknik, Splean
Nashestvie-2018	2—5 August, Bolshoe Zavidovo, Tver Oblast	around 200,000	Also featured an air show by Russian Knights and an exhibition of military technology. Several bands declined to participate due to involvement of the Russian Ministry of Defense in the festival's organization.	Alisa, Aria, Leningrad, Melnitsa, Piknik, Splean
Nashestvie-2019	18—21 July, Bolshoe Zavidovo, Tver Oblast		Due to the previous year's controversy, Nashe abandoned its partnership with the Ministry of Defense and chose Roscosmos as its new partner.	Alisa, Aquarium, Bi-2, DDT, Melnitsa, Piknik, Splean
Nashestvie-2020 and 2021 were cancelled because of the Coronavirus pandemic. Nashestvie 2022 was cancelled because of the war in Ukraine. The festival did not take place during the planned 2023, 2024, and 2025 dates.

== See also ==
- List of historic rock festivals
