= Izgoy =

Outcast

Studio album by Alisa
- Released: October 2005
- Recorded: January – May 2005
- Genre: Hard rock Nu metal Christian rock
- Length: 49:03
- Label: Real Records

Alisa chronology
It's Later Than You Think (2003)	Outcast (2005)	The Built of the North (2007)

Singles from Blue Border
- 1. "Outcast"; 2. "The Night"; 3. "Blue Border"

Izgoy (Изгой, Exile) - is a studio album by Alisa released in 2005 by Real Records. Outcast was the first album made by a new line up (with Igor Romanov (lead guitar) and Andrey Vdovichenko (drums)). A single Blue Border (Синий предел, Siniy Predel) preceded the album. The band released three video clips for the songs from the album: Rock-n-Roll Cross (Рок-н-ролл крест), The Brutes (Звери) and Baptism (Крещение).

== Recording ==
At the end of January 2005 Alisa began to record the album Outcast. German audio engineers were invited: Jam (already took part in mixing of the previous album It's later than you think) and Dave. Earlier both engineers worked with Guano Apes, Rammstein and U2.

At first Alisa made a demo record which was sent to Germany. Then Jam and Dave moved to Saint Petersburg and controlled the record process at studio "Dobrolet".

Musicians did their best; sometimes Konstantin Kinchev finished to record his parts at 6 a.m. Eugeny Levin interpreted from Russian to English and vice versa, that is why he couldn't speak as usual after five days of recording. Igor Vdovichenko played very precisely what made the recording easier for Petr Samoylov. Igor Romanov was very scrupulous about his parts - he was ready to record them more and more times even when it wasn't necessary. Sometimes other members of the band had to stop him so that the album didn't consist only of his solos. Dmitry Parfenov recorded his parts at home and in studio he was only controlling the process of recording.

Album was mixed in Germany: at first at Topaz studio in Cologne and then at Skayline Tonfabrik in Düsseldorf. It was mixed in April. In July Alisa chose a label: it was Real Records. The album hit the shelves in October.

== Single ==
September 6, 2005 Real Records released single Blue Border (Синий предел).

The first song was Outcast.

The second was The Night (cover for Piknik's song). It was written after Dmitry Parfenov (Alisa's keyboard player) got a proposal to make an album of covers for Piknik's songs. When recording of this album was going to be finished an idea to invite Konstantin Kinchev to record one song appeared. He accepted the offer and chose the song The Night. It was included as a bonus track in the mentioned project of Piknik (this album was named Egyptian Nights) and in Alisa's single.

The third song of the single is Blue Border. Alexei Rybnikov made an offer of a joint record for Konstantin Kinchev. Alisa's leader could choose any Rybnikov's music and he pitched upon soundtrack for movie Treasure Island. Konstantin Kinchev added his variant of couplet and refrain and composed the text.

The single also included videobonus: performance of the song Antichrist on concert "We Are Together 20 Years".

== Songs ==
The song which was composed earlier than all others is Fear, Ask and Believe. It was composed in Cologne during mixing of the album It's later than you think.

Konstantin Kinchev appreciated Son Jerusalem as the main song of the album and told that all other compositions are "built" around it.

Konstantin Kinchev speaking about the song Outcast:

If speaking about the song it is about Christ. If speaking generally it's about people who make their lifes by going again the stream. Because only dead fish goes adrift.

Answering the questions: do you sympathize outcasts? What attracts you in them? Konstantin answered:

Outcast is a conscious choice of a man. It is already a position. A person who is ready to refuse benefits for his own position can't cause anything except for respect even if his beliefs are not concordant with our view of the world.

The shootings of videoclip for Rock-n-roll Cross took place in half-constructed Winter Palace in Kyiv. A special stage was made; a lot of pyrotechnics was used. Two days before the start of the shootings the band began to choose people for roles of spectators in the videoclip. 300 members from Alisa's fan club were chosen.

== Konstantin Kinchev about the album ==
Comparing Outcast with previous It's later than you think Konstantin Kinchev named it to be more rough. He also added that in the previous album he "shared his thoughts about the destiny of Motherland" and in Outcast we can hear feelings about his inner struggle.

After release of the album Konstantin Kinchev was pleased with its sound quality:

We have made an effort to combine incompatible things in this album - I think that this is what the art is. In principle rock is a synthesis of arts. Did we manage to do it - it's a question for audience. But I'm pleased with this work. On the other hand the genre of nu metal is narrow-minded so we can't avoid comparisons with other bands. If desired you can hear there Clawfinger, Rammstein. Clawfinger is even more: My war resembles Live Like A Man. I won't say that it's quite the same but just listening to Clawfinger pushed me to use such a riff. But unlike the Swedes we leave some place for melodious songs. There are two of them in Outcast. Besides every word in our album is audible.

== Track listing ==
All tracks are written by Konstantin Kinchev, except where noted.

No.	Title	Length
1.	"My War (Clawfinger cover)"	4:25
2.	"Outcast (Rammstein cover)"	4:15
3.	"A Star Called Rock"	4:14
4.	"Black" ((music by Kinchev and Levin))	4:10
5.	"Sun Jerusalem"	9:32
6.	"The Word"	4:26
7.	"Fear, Ask and Believe"	3:20
8.	"The Brutes (Rammstein cover)"	4:19
9.	"Rock-n-roll Cross"	4:47
10.	"Baptism" ((music by Romanov and Kinchev))	5:35
Total length:		49:03
