= Arms Collector =

Arms Collector Коллекционер Оружия

Studio album by Splean
- Released: April 1996
- Genre: Rock, Russian Rock
- Length: 53:05
- Label: SNC/re-released by Mistery of sound (Мистерия звука)

Splean chronology
Dusty Fact (1994)	Arms Collector; Коллекционер Оружия (1996)	Black Eye (1997)

Arms Collector (Russian: Коллекционер Оружия, romanized: Kollekcioner Oruzhija) is the second album by the Russian band Splean, released in 1996.

== Track listing ==
=== Demo version ===
The demo version of the album includes 8 tracks. One of the tracks, "Kuda letit moi samolyot?" (Russian: «Куда летит мой самолёт?»), was not included in the final version of album. The name of the track "Strannaya pesnya" (Russian: «Странная песня») was changed to "Samovar" (Russian: «Самовар») in the original release.

All tracks are written by Aleksandr Vasilyev

No.	Title	Length
1.	"Будь моей тенью (Be My Shadow)"	5:22
2.	"Чёрный цвет Солнца (Black Colour of the Sun)"	7:49
3.	"Любовь идёт по проводам (Love Comes Through the Wires)"	4:18
4.	"Странная песня (Самовар) (Strange song (Samovar))"	5:10
5.	"Куда летит мой самолёт? (Where is my plane flying?)"	5:13
6.	"Что ты будешь делать? (What Will You Do?)"	5:05
7.	"Рыба без трусов (Fish without Briefs)"	3:16
8.	"Иди через лес (Go Through the Forest)"	6:54

=== Original release ===
No.	Title	Length
1.	"Будь моей тенью (Be My Shadow)"	5:41
2.	"Любовь идёт по проводам (Love Comes Through the Wires)"	4:24
3.	"Чёрный цвет Солнца (Black Colour of the Sun)"	7:48
4.	"Самовар (Samovar)"	5:31
5.	"Жертва талого льда (Victim of Thawed Ice)"	5:46
6.	"Что ты будешь делать? (What Will You Do?)"	5:10
7.	"Рыба без трусов (Fish without Briefs)"	3:10
8.	"Сказка (Fairy Tale)"	5:36
9.	"Нечего делать внутри (Nothing to Do Inside)"	3:26
10.	"Иди через лес (Go Through the Forest)"	6:32

== Personnel ==
- Aleksandr Vasilyev – vocals, lyrics
- Aleksandr Morozov – bass guitar
- Nikolai Rostovskii – keyboards
- Nikolai Lysov – drums
- Stas Berezovskii – guitar
- Nikolai Panov – saxophone
