= Begunov =

Begunov or Biehunoŭ (Belarusian: Бегуноў, Russian: Бегунов) or female form Begunova (Belarusian: Бегуноў, Russian: Бегунова) is a surname of Slavic-language origin. Notable people with this surname include:

- Roman Begunov (born 1993), Belarusian footballer
- Vladimir Begunov (born 1959), Russian guitarist and songwriter
