= Stigmata (Russian band) =

Russian metalcore band

- Origin: Saint Petersburg, Russia
- Genres: Metalcore, alternative metal, emocore, nu-metal, electronic rock
- Years active: 2003—present
- Labels: Kap-Kan, Navigator, Nikitin, M2BA, Sliptrick Records, Gentlepunks
- Members: Denis Kichenko; Artyom Lotskikh; Taras Umansky; Grigory Karpov
- Website: stigmata.ru

Stigmata is a Russian metal band formed in Saint Petersburg in 2003. By 2023, the band has released 6 studio albums, 1 EP, 1 compilation album and two live DVDs.

== History ==
=== 2000-2006: Early years, alternative metal period ===
Stigmata originates from a then-unnamed band formed in 2000. In 2003, the word "stigmata" was accidentally found by bassist Denis Kichenko and chosen for being memorable and pleasant to the ear, also the first letter "S" turned into a cool logo. Original singer Artur Maltsev left and vocalist Artyom "Nel'son" Lotskih joined the band.

In 2004, guitarist Igor Kapranov left Stigmata to join another Russian metal band, Amatory, as a singer. Stigmata signed a record deal with Russian music label Kap-Kan Records and released their first full-length album titled Конвейер снов (Transliteration: Konveyer Snov/English: Conveyor of Dreams).

The band's second album Больше чем любовь (Bolshe Chem Lyubov/Bigger than Love) was released in September 2005. In early 2006, Stigmata released a DVD called Pieces of Life consisting of 17 tracks. The same year, original drummer Nikita Ignatyev left the band and was replaced by Philipp Terpetsky. Andrey Anisimov joined as the lead guitarist.

=== 2006-2008: self-titled album ===
In December 2006, Stigmata released a single called "Лёд" ("Lyod"/"Ice").

In 2007 toured through Russia and supported Killswitch Engage and Caliban on their live gigs in Russia. The single "Сентябрь" ("Sentyabr"/"September") was released the same year and has since become the band's biggest hit and an Internet meme. In September 2007, Stigmata signed to Navigator Records and released its third, sel-titled studio album Stigmata. At the end of 2007, Philipp Terpetsky left the band and Fyodor Lokshin became the new drummer. In 2008, the band released their second DVD titled Acoustic & Drive. In support of Stigmata, the band toured through Belarus, Estonia, Lithuania, and Ukraine and shared the stage with Pleymo and Natalie Imbruglia on Russia's biggest Rock music festival "Крылья" ("Wings").

=== 2009-2011: My Way ===
In 2009, the band released a single "Взлёт и Падение" ("Vzlet i Padeniye"/"Rise and Fall"). The same year Anisimov was replaced by Artyom Teplinsky on guitars. In 2010, the fourth studio album Мой путь (Moi Put/My Way) was released via Navigator Records. The album was released in two versions: a regular CD-version consisting of 10 tracks and a Digital version with additional Intro, Outro and three music videos.

In 2010, the band supported Bullet for My Valentine and Ozzy Osbourne on their concerts in Russia and toured extensively, having played over 50 dates in Russia, Ukraine and Belarus, including such festivals as Nashestvie, Окна Открой! (Okna Otkroi!/Open Windows!) and Соседний мир (Sosedny Mir/Neighbouring World) among others.

=== 2011-2016: Based on Real-Life Events and Legion ===
In 2011, Stigmata supported Slipknot on their concert in Saint Petersburg, Russia. The same year Lokshin left the band, it was joined by Vladimir Zinoviev.

In 2012, Stigmata released their fifth album, Основано На Реальных Событиях (Osnovano na Realnykh Sobytiyah/Based on Real-Life Events) via Nikitin Records. The same year the band supported Korn in Saint Petersburg, Russia.

In the fall of 2015, Stigmata independently released the Legion EP and supported it with the 'Legion Tour', consisting of 27 cities in Russia.

=== 2016-2018: Mainstream? ===
In July 2016, the band played their new song "Цунами" ("Tsunami") at their live gig in the Port of VDNH. The song was released as a single on March 9, 2017, accompanied by a music video.

On November 1, 2017, the band released their sixth studio album, Mainstream?, via M2BA Records, which was supported by a 20-dates tour. In 2018, the album was re-released via Sliptrick Records.

=== 2019-present: Kaleidoscope, non-album singles and member changes ===
In 2019, Stigmata released a non-album single "Фараоны" ("Pharaony"/"Pharaohs") accompanied by a music video, and an acoustic compilation album, Калейдоскоп (Kaleidoscope), accompanied by a music video for "Истории" ("Istorii"/"Stories"), the only new song from the album.

In 2020, Zinoviev was replaced by Aleks Khoroshevsky on drums, Kozhuro was replaced by Teplinsky on guitars. The band released a non-album single "Поколение Z" ("Gen Z").

In 2022, Khoroshevsky was replaced with Grigory Karpov, Teplinsky left for the second time. The same year Stigmata released a non-album single "Полюса" ("Poles") via Gentlepunks.

== Members ==
Current members

- Denis Kichenko – bass (2001–present)
- Taras Umansky – rhythm guitar, backing vocals, programming (2001–present), lead guitar (2004–2006)
- Artyom "Nel'son" Lotskikh – lead vocals (2003–present)
- Grigory "Gregor" Karpov – drums, percussion (2022–present)

Former members

- Artur Maltsev – lead vocals (2003)
- Igor Kapranov – lead guitar (2003–2004)
- Nikita "Nick" Ignatyev – drums (2003–2006)
- Sergey "Vint" Aigorov – rhythm guitar (2005)
- Philipp "Phil" Terpetsky – drums (2006–2007)
- Andrey "Duke" Anisimov – lead guitar (2006–2009)
- Fyodor "Feud'or" Lokshin – drums (2007–2011)
- Artyom "Yosh" Teplinsky – lead guitar, programming (2009–2017, 2020–2022)
- Vladimir Zynoviev – drums, percussion (2011–2020)
- Dmitriy "Mitjay" Kozhuro – lead guitar, programming (2017–2020)
- Aleks Khoroshevsky – drums, percussion (2020–2022)

== Discography ==
=== Albums ===
- 2004 — Конвейер Снов ("Conveyor of Dreams"; Kap-Kan Records; re-issued in 2005)
- 2005 — Больше, Чем Любовь ("Bigger than Love"; Kap-Kan Records)
- 2007 — Stigmata (Navigator Records)
- 2009 — Мой Путь ("My Way"; Navigator Records)
- 2012 — Основано На Реальных Событиях ("Based on Real-Life Events"; Nikitin)
- 2017 — Mainstream? (M2BA/Sliptrick Records)

=== EP ===
- 2015 — Legion (Independent)

=== Compilations ===
- 2019 — Калейдоскоп ("Kaleidoscope"; M2BA)

=== Singles ===
- 2006 — Лёд ("Ice"; Kap-Kan records)
- 2007 — Сентябрь ("September"; Navigator Records)
- 2009 — Взлёт и Падение ("Rise and Fall"; Navigator Records)
- 2011 — До Девятой Ступени ("Until the Ninth Step")
- 2011 — Камикадзе ("Kamikaze")
- 2017 — Цунами ("Tsunami"; M2BA)
- 2017 — Кобра ("Cobra"; M2BA)
- 2017 — Против правил ("Against the Rules"; M2BA)
- 2019 — Фараоны ("Pharaohs"; M2BA)
- 2020 — Поколение Z ("Gen Z"; M2BA)
- 2022 — Полюса ("Poles"; Gentlepunks)

=== DVDs ===
- 2006 — Pieces of Life (Kap-Kan Records)
- 2008 — Acoustic & Drive (Navigator Records)
