= Dusty Fact =

Dusty Fact Пыльная Быль

Studio album by Splean
- Released: May 1994
- Genre: Rock, Russian Rock
- Length: 39:50
- Label: 1994 Frost Records; 1997 Sound Product; 2002 Мистерия Звука
- Producer: Alexander Morozov

Splean chronology
Dusty Fact; Пыльная Быль (1994)	Arms Collector (1996)

Dusty Fact (Russian: Пыльная быль, romanized: Pyl'naja Byl) is the first album by the Russian rock group Splean. It was recorded onto audio cassette at night, in the secrecy of the studio in the St. Petersburg Buff Theatre. At the time Alexander Vasilyev and Alexander Morozov were working there.

== Track listing ==
All tracks are written by Alexander Vasilyev (except fourth track).

No.	Title	Length
1.	"Жертва талого льда (Victim of Thawed Ice)"	6:01
2.	"Холодные зимы (Cold Winters)"	1:31
3.	"Мне сказали слово (They Told Me a Word)"	3:08
4.	"Под сурдинку (With a Mute)"	3:27
5.	"Гроза (Thunderstorm)"	3:44
6.	"Война (War)"	2:31
7.	"Пыльная быль. Сказка (Dusty Fact. Fairy Tale)"	5:20
8.	"Серебряные реки (Silver Rivers)"	2:53
9.	"Твое разбитое пенсне (Your Broken Pince-Nez)"	1:23
10.	"Сказочный леший (Wood-goblin)"	1:42
11.	"Санкт-Петербургское небо (St. Petersburg Sky)"	2:30
12.	"Звери (Beasts)"	2:36
13.	"Рыба без трусов (Fish without Briefs) (bonus in reissue, absent in the first version of the album)"	3:05

== Personnel ==
- Alexander Vasilyev - Vocals, Guitar
- Alexander Morozov - Drum-Machine, Bass Guitar
- Nikolay Rostovsky - Keyboards, Wind Instruments
