= Kniga Myortvykh =

Studio album by Amatory
- Released: October 13, 2006
- Recorded: July–September 2006, DDT Studio & Apollo Studio
- Genre: Nu metal
- Length: 45:53
- Label: Kapkan Records
- Producer: Jacob Hansen

Amatory chronology
Neizbezhnost' (Inevitability) (2004)	Kniga Myortvykh (2006)	VII (2008)

Singles from Kniga Myortvykh (Book of the Dead)
- 1. "Effekt Babochki (Butterfly Effect)" Released: 2006; 2. "Prestuplenie Protiv Vremeni (A crime against time)" Released: 2006

Kniga Myortvykh is the third studio album by Russian alternative metal band Amatory. This is the last record with solo guitarist Sergey Osechkin who died on March 15, 2007.

== Background ==
After the festival "Invasion", [AMATORY] had less than a month to prepare for their new tour, which covered Moscow, St. Petersburg, and also, for the first time in the group's career, the cities of the Commonwealth of Independent States. Despite the tight concert schedule allowing the group to not finish recording demo versions of their new album, the band tried to fill every gap between tours and individual performances with new songs.

The title of the album was chosen using a coin flip. [STEWART] (Daniil Svetlov) wanted to name the album "The Story of my True", but [GANG] (Sergey Osechkin) wanted to name the album "Book of the Dead", which Svetlov didn't like due to Osechkin potentially having liver cancer. Eventually, the album was titled "Book of the Dead" and released on October 13, 2006.

== Track listing ==
No.	Title	Length
1.	"Do you Remember? (Помнишь?)"	1:22
2.	"Seven Steps (Семь шагов)"	3:29
3.	"Here and Now (Здесь и Сейчас)"	4:20
4.	"A Snow in the Hell (Снег в аду)"	3:25
5.	"I am gone (Меня больше нет)"	3:40
6.	"Turn Back (Обернуться назад)"	4:34
7.	"Give Me Your Scream (Отдай Свой Крик)"	3:02
8.	"A Crime Against Time (Преступление против времени)"	4:47
9.	"Too Late (Слишком поздно)"	4:08
10.	"My True (Моя Правда)"	4:19
11.	"Butterfly Effect (Эффект Бабочки)"	4:11
12.	"Losing Me (Теряешь меня)"	4:28

== Personnel ==
Amatory

- Daniil "Stewart" Svetlov — drums
- Denis "Denver" Zhivotovsky — bass guitar, clean vocals
- Alexander "Alex" Pavlov — rhythm guitar
- Sergey "Gang" Osechkin — solo guitar
- Igor "Igor" Kapranov — death growl
