= Sila Uma =

Studio album by Kirpichi
- Released: September 23, 2002
- Recorded: 2002
- Genre: Rap rock
- Length: 47:53
- Label: Gala-Records
- Producer: Kirpichi

Kirpichi chronology
Kapitalizm 00 (2000)	Sila Uma (2002)	Let's rock! (2004)

Professional ratings
Review scores
Source	Rating
Muz-Prosvet	8/10 stars

Sila Uma (Power of the mind) is fourth and most acclaimed album from Saint Petersburg band Kirpichi. Its music is mostly hip hop with blend of other genres like nu metal, rapcore and lo-fi. Kirpichi's members consider this album as a "nonconformistic Do-It-Yourself product". Two of the album's singles have music videos: "Dzedai" and "Shkolnichki".

== Track listing ==
#	Title	Time
1	"Sila Uma" (Power of the mind)	4:16
2	"Dzedai (Джедаи)" (Jedis)	3:33
3	"Novyi poryadok (Новый порядок)" (New order)	1:44
4	"Inostr" (transliteration of 'foreign')	4:04
5	"Komu ty verish? (Кому ты веришь?)" (Who do you trust?)	3:57
6	"Rialnaya tema (Риальная тема)" (Real thing)	4:18
7	"Vechniy simvol strakha (Вечный символ страха)" (Everytime fear symbol)	2:41
8	"Vot tak ya razvlekayus' (Вот так я развлекаюсь)" (This is how I chill)	3:40
9	"Zolotoy gvozd' programmy (Золотой гвоздь программы)" (Headliner of the show)	5:08
10	"Get down"	3:14
11	"Shkolnichki (Школьнички)" (Schoolkids)	3:28
12	"S drugimi (С другими)" (With others)	4:00
13	"Sinyaya tema (Синяя тема)" (Blue theme)	3:43
*	"Bez botvy (Без ботвы)" (No shitting)	3:39
*	"Glotay! (Глотай!)" (Gulp!)	3:06

marked as * is available only in cassette version
