= Mara (singer) =

Russian singer (born 1978)

Mara Мара
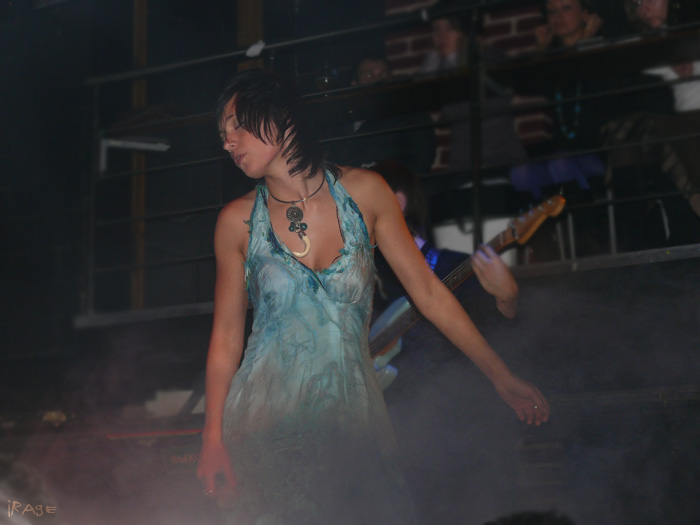
- Mara in 2007

Background information
- Born: Marina Vladimirovna Nesterova; 25 November 1978 (age 47)
- Origin: Moscow, Russian SFSR, Soviet Union
- Genres: Alternative rock, pop rock, indie rock
- Years active: 2003–present
- Label: Navigator Records
- Website: maramusic.ru

Mara Vladimirovna Kana (Russian: Ма́ра Влади́мировна Кана́, birth name Marina Vladimirovna Nesterova (Russian: Мари́на Влади́мировна Не́стерова; born November 25, 1978, in Moscow) is a Russian rock singer, musician, and songwriter.

== Biography ==
She was born on November 25, 1978, in Moscow. Until 2000, she lived in Ivanteyevka, near Moscow, then moved to the capital.

Studied at the Moscow University of Consumer Cooperatives. In 2003 on the air of Nashe Radio, for the first time, Mara's song Airplanes was heard, which subsequently was on the Chart Dozen hit parade for several months.

== Scandals ==
In 2004 at the Nashestvie rock festival, the singer exposed her breasts while performing the song Sex in front of a 70,000-strong crowd of spectators.

Since 2014 she has been performing a number of nationalist works in the sense of Blood and soil.

In 2022 she supported the Russian invasion of Ukraine.

== Discography ==
=== Studio albums ===
- 2003 — Frankness
- 2005 — 220V
- 2012 — Two Worlds
- 2015 — War and Peace
- 2018 — Russian Star

=== Live albums ===
- 2008 — Unplugged
- 2013 — Feel the Difference
