= Instinkt Obrechyonnykh =

Studio album by Amatory
- Released: October 26, 2010
- Genre: Metalcore; alternative metal
- Length: 41:06
- Label: FG Nikitin
- Producer: Tue Madsen, Amatory

Amatory chronology
| VII (2008) | Instinkt Obrechyonnykh (2010) | 6 (2015) |

Instinkt Obrechyonnykh (Russian: Инстинкт обречённых, lit. Instinct of the Doomed) is the fifth studio album by the Russian metalcore band Amatory. The album was produced by Tue Madsen.

== Track listing ==
| No. | Title | Length |
|---|---|---|
| 1. | "Сквозь Закрытые Веки" (Through Closed Eyelids) | 3:55 |
| 2. | "Стеклянные Люди" (Glass People) | 3:32 |
| 3. | "Империя Зла" (Evil Empire) | 4:06 |
| 4. | "Белый Шум" (White Noise) | 3:40 |
| 5. | "Инферно" (Inferno) | 3:40 |
| 6. | "F20" | 3:39 |
| 7. | "Молчи!" (Shut up!) | 3:46 |
| 8. | "Горизонты Снов" (Horizons of Dreams) | 4:05 |
| 9. | "Один Час До Конца Света" (One Hour Before the End of the World) | 3:08 |
| 10. | "Ответ Знает..." (He Knows the Answer) | 2:08 |
| 11. | "Багровый Рассвет" (Crimson Dawn) | 3:31 |
| 12. | "Я Слышу Голоса Миллионов" (I Hear the Voices of Millions) | 4:56 |
| Total length: | | 41:06 |

== Personnel ==
Amatory

- Alexander [ALEX] Pavlov — guitars, keyboards, samples
- Denis [DENVER] Zhivotovskiy — bass, clean & growled vocals
- Dmitriy [JAY] Rubanosky — guitars
- Daniil [STEWART] Svetlov — drums, samples on track 4
- Vyacheslav [SLAVA] Sokolov — screamed & clean vocals

Guest appearances

- Alexander Zarankin – keyboards (12)
- Heiko Klotz – keyboards (4)
- Evgeniy "PJ" Potekhin - additional vocals (2,3)
