= Amatory =

Russian band

[AMATORY]
- Origin: St. Petersburg, Russia
- Genres: Alternative metal; metalcore; electronic rock; alternative rock; nu metal
- Years active: Since 2001 (1998)
- Labels: Caravan Records; Капкан Records; Polygon Records (Russia); FG Nikitin
- Members: Daniil [STEWART] Svetlov; Dmitriy [HELLDIMM] Muzychenko; Sergei [RAEV] Raev; Ilya [EEL] Borisov; Denis [DENVER] Zhivotovsky
- Past members: Evgenyy "PJ" Potekhin; Aleksey "Liolik" Skornyakov; Aleksey "Lexus" Ovchinnikov; Sergey [GANG] Osechkin †; Igor [IGOR] Kapranov; Dmitriy [JAY] Rubanovsky; Aleksander [ALEX] Pavlov; Ilya [K] Kukhin; Vyacheslav [SLAVA] Sokolov
- Website: www.amatory.ru

Amatory (commonly stylized as [AMATORY], to fit their logo) is a Russian alternative metal band from Saint Petersburg, formed in 1998 by Denis [DENVER] Zhivotovsky and Daniil [STEWART] Svetlov.

In 1998, they were joined by Evgenyy PJ Potekhin. However, the band's official birthday isn't until April 1, 2001, when Sergey [GANG] Osechkin became the final member of the group's original quartet.

They are considered one of the pioneers of Russian alternative metal but their musical approach changed over the years.

Despite limited mainstream media exposure, [AMATORY] has gained a substantial fanbase through their live performances in Russia, Eastern and Northern Europe, and Central Asia. At the moment they have released 7 full-length studio albums, 2 instrumental albums and 7 (including 4 instrumental) EPs.

== History ==
=== 1998–2001: Early years ===
[AMATORY] founders Denis [DENVER] Zhivotovsky (Russian: Денис Животовский) and Daniil [STEWART] Svetlov (Russian: Даниил Светлов) met at the age of 13 in the spring of 1998.

Initial rehearsals were held that same spring in Svetlov's apartment, where they played snippets of their favorite songs by Nirvana, Sex Pistols, The Exploited, and a self-penned song by Zhivotovsky.

Rehearsals were moved to Zhivotovsky's apartment because it had an empty bedroom, where Svetlov could bring his drum set. The building itself was so called khrushchyovka (Russian: хрущевка) also known as krushcheby (Russian: хрущеба, Khrushchev-slum) – cheap, easy-to-build apartment blocks that were massively built all over the former Soviet Union from the late 1950s to the early 1980s. They are well known for their poor thermal and sound insulation. With this in mind, the aspiring musicians covered the walls, the door, and floor of their makeshift bedroom rehearsal space with carpets, but it didn't work, the neighbours complained about the noise, and regularly banged on the door and called the police.

The trio began performing live by covering Nirvana songs in a nearby school. In 1999, Potekhin and Zhivotovsky became obsessed with Korn, but at the same time Svetlov became "addicted" to black metal and grindcore. He began to distance himself from his bandmates, due to their differing musical tastes. So, the rest of the band began to write grindcore style music, but to incorporate their own interests, began introducing, little by little, elements of alternative metal.

In the summer of 1999, they found a rehearsal space in a youth club called Rubin, but, to use it, they had to come up with a group name. So, PJ chose the name of the band: [AMATORY]. He supposedly chose this from an English–Russian dictionary, picking it specifically because it sounded similar to other metal bands Crematory, Obituary and Cemetary.

Gradually they realized that they needed a second guitarist, after a short search they found Sergey [GANG] Osechkin (Russian: Сергей Осечкин). The first rehearsal as a four member band took place on April 1, 2001, which became the band's official birthday. The group played several concerts as a complete, four member band. However, in June, Potekhin was drafted into the army, and so the group lost their leader. Zhivotovsky took over as lead vocalist and lyric writer, while Osechkin became their music composer. These new roles in place, the group recorded the demo "I Don't Live to See It" (Russian: Не доживаю).

=== 2001–2004: Fate's Eternally Hiding (Вечно Прячется Судьба) ===
A concert in support of "The Bread" was scheduled on November 26, 2002, in a new club "Orlandina." All the bandmates were there on time, except for Liolik who had mysteriously disappeared. They later found out that, on his way to the club, Liolik was stopped by a police patrol who wanted to verify his documents, and was unexpectedly drafted into military service for the next two years, and so, [AMATORY] lost their second bandmate to the Russian armed forces.

In 2003, though limited in resources, the band began recording their debut studio album. In April they released a single entitled "Fragments" (Russian: Осколки) which is regarded as one of their signature songs.

The album, Fate's Eternally Hiding (Russian: Вечно Прячется Судьба), with Zhivotovsky and Ovchinnikov on vocals, was released on November 14, 2003. It was named after one of the songs that was inspired by Irvine Welsh's novella Fate's Eternally Hiding from his trilogy Ecstasy: Three Tales of Chemical Romance. In an interview to "In Search of Titans" (Russian: В поисках Титанов) Ovchinnikov remembers writing and correcting the lyrics together with Zhivotovsky during classes in school, and recording the vocals in a closet (because they could not afford a recording studio).

Shortly before the album's release Alexander [ALEX] Pavlov (Russian: Александр Павлов) became the second guitarist of the band.

=== 2004—2006: Inevitability (Неизбежность) ===
On March 14, 2004, [AMATORY] released a maxi-single called "Two Lives" (Russian: Две Жизни). Shortly beforehand, Ovchinnikov left the band and his place was taken by the guitarist of Stigmata: Igor [IGOR] Kapranov (Russian: Игорь Капранов). It was in making the artwork for this single, that they first put the band's name and their own pseudonyms in square brackets, stylized to fit their logo. They continue to use this stylization to this day.

Following the release of the single, they immediately began to work on new material, this time in collaboration with Danish producer Jacob Hansen (Amaranthe, Volbeat, Epica). Through working with Jacob, [AMATORY] began to play "in a western manner." Despite the fact that [IGOR] joined the band as the vocalist, he had never sung before. Consequently, almost all the growling parts of the upcoming album were recorded by [DENVER].

Their second studio album, Inevitability (Russian: Неизбежность), with [DENVER] and [IGOR], on vocals was released on October 14.

In early 2005, the band released their first DVD titled [P]ost [S]criptum, which consisted of home videos they had recorded of their crew and friends during the tour for Inevitability.

In September 2005, [AMATORY] supported Korn in Saint Petersburg and Moscow. At the same time, "Black and White Days" won RAMP 2005 (Russian Alternative Music Prize) for "Best Music Video," and [AMATORY] won the "Best Band" category.

=== 2006—2008: Book Of The Dead (Книга Мертвых) ===
In the spring of 2006, during the "Rock 5 Tour", Sergey [GANG] Osechkin suddenly felt severe pain in his right side, and he continued to feel unwell throughout the following summer, while the band was working on new material.

However, they managed to finish their third album, Book of the Dead (Russian: Книга Мертвых), and it was released on Friday the 13th, in October 2006. Five days later, right before the band's performance as an opening act for Stone Sour, they were told that [GANG] had been diagnosed with liver cancer. Five months later, on March 15, 2007 Osechkin, at only 23 years old, died. He was buried with his first guitar, a Jackson, which his grandmother had gifted to him, at the Cemetery in Memory of the Victims of January 9 in Saint Petersburg.

The period that followed was, according to the band members, one of the worst in the group's history. They ultimately decided to move on, but it was a difficult decision. According to [STEWART], they began heavily drinking. It was only their session guitarist, Niky Yuriev, who kept them from getting depressed during the first leg of the Live Evil tour.

However, even though 2007 was a year of huge tragedy for the band, it also marked their breakthrough to a mass audience. According to one of the largest Russian newspapers, Rossiyskaya Gazeta, [AMATORY] became a phenomenon and "a dictator of fashion" on the Russian music scene, playing a huge number of sold-out shows throughout the country, despite the lack of media support. The band also began to gain a following outside of Russia and former Soviet countries, receiving fan mail from Latin America, Indonesia, and other countries in Europe.

In the spring of 2007, [AMATORY] went on the second leg of the Live Evil tour with session guitarist Ivan Ludewig (Russian: Иван Людевиг, ex-Kirpichi). On April 26, 2007, the band did a sold-out show at the Yubileyny Sports Palace, which filmed and later released as the concert DVD+CD "Live Evil." By the summer of that year, they began looking for a new guitarist. At the same time [AMATORY] was invited to perform with Linkin Park in Moscow and Saint Petersburg, but they ultimately decided to prioritize their sold-out gig in Moscow, and a benefit concert in memory of Sergey Osechkin, where all funds raised went to his family and the installation of a memorial.

In September, the band went on Saint Seventh Tour, with new session guitarist Dmitry Rubanovsky. During the tour, the internet TV channel Nashe TV filmed a 17-episode series called "[AMATORY] in Your City" (Russian: [AMATORY] в твоем городе), which gave behind-the-scenes looks at their concerts and day-to-day life on tour.

On September 19, 2007, a live music video Butterfly Effect (Russian: Эффект Бабочки) from the upcoming DVD Live Evil was released. Also in 2007, [AMATORY] released their second DVD EVol.01 made of home videos filmed during their tours since May 2005.

=== 2008—2010: VII ===
In the beginning of 2008, ESP Guitars and the band's guitarist Alexander [ALEX] Pavlov created a signature guitar named ESP LTD [A – 600], which was the first signature guitar ever awarded to a Russian guitarist. On March 20, the DVD+CD Live Evil, mixed and mastered by Jacob Hansen at Hansen Studios in Denmark, was released. Later, on April 5, [AMATORY] received the FUZZ Award in the "Best Alternative Band" category.

In September 2008, their session guitarist Dmitry [JAY] Rubanovsky became the band's new guitarist and principal music writer. In October, Nashe TV started broadcasting a mini-series filmed during the recording sessions for the upcoming album, providing insight into the creation of new songs in collaboration with Danish producer Tue Madsen, known for his work with Meshuggah, Dark Tranquility, and Suicide Silence. While the album was recorded with both Russian and English versions, the English version was ultimately not released.

In November, [AMATORY] released the single Breathe with Me (Russian: Дыши со мной), and signed a contract with the music label FG Nikitin. Breathe with Me was incredibly popular on the Russian radio, and in some neighboring country, staying at the number one position for seven weeks, surpassing even The Prodigy and Depeche Mode. In 2009 it won the RAMP for "Best Song." However, while the song was hugely popular, it also resulted in some erroneous plagiarism charges, as Rubanovsky had written the music, and lyrics (in English), while a member of the band Tearfall, and his next band, Horizon 8, had recorded a second version. In [AMATORY], a third version of the song was created, with lyrics, this time in Russian, written by Zhivotovsky.

On November 7, 2008, [AMATORY] released their fourth studio album titled VII. It became their first album with [JAY], which earned rave reviews from critics, but divided reactions among fans. Following the release, the band went on the Sold Out Tour. This tour marked the first time they took their own equipment on tour, resulting in higher ticket prices. This, combined with the effects of the Great Recession, caused concert attendance to drop significantly.

In April 2009, NTV showed a TV report about the band, underlining that they became iconic without producers and mainstream media support. A little later Daniil Svetlov became "Drummer Of The Year" ("Musician" magazine awards).

On October 27, 2009, the band released the internet single Crimson Dawn (Russian: Багровый Рассвет) mixed by American producer Chris (Zeuss) Harris.

=== 2010—2012: Instinct Of The Doomed (Инстинкт Обреченных) ===
In March 2010, Amphora Publishers (Russian: Издательство Амфора) published the hard cover book "Black and White Days: The Truth about [AMATORY]" (Russian: Черно-Белые Дни. Вся правда о группе [AMATORY])" written by the music journalist Aleksey Kuzovlev (Russian: Алексей Кузовлев). The book tells about the band’s early days and their thorny way to the overwhelming success, and contains many exclusive interviews with [DENVER], [IGOR], [ALEX], [STEWART] and [JAY] taken over two and a half years.

On July 4, 2010, the band performed at Tuska Open Air. Two weeks later, on July 28, at the height of [AMATORY]’s fame, Igor Kapranov, at only 23 years of age, announced that he was quitting music to devote himself to religion. This was a complete surprise to both his bandmates, fans, and the media. Following his announcement, [IGOR] spent a year in the orthodox Valaam Monastery (Russian: Валаамский монастырь). Following this year, he briefly toured with [AMATORY] as a special guest for their tenth anniversary, but after this sang solely in a church choir.

Kapranov departed the group a month before the start of recording sessions for their second album Tue Madsen. New material for the album was already ready, a record studio had been booked, the airplane tickets to Saint Petersburg to see Madsen had been purchased, which meant that the band was forced to find a new vocalist in an extremely short period of time. On October 6, 2010, they premiered a single titled "Through Closed Eyelids" (Russian: Сквозь Закрытые Веки), and their new singer was revealed to be Vyacheslav [SLAVA] Sokolov of The Wheels Of Sorrow (ex- Such A Beautiful Day).

The fifth studio album Instinct of the Doomed (Russian: Инстинкт Обреченных) with [DENVER] and [SLAVA] on vocals was released on October 24.

In June 2011, [AMATORY] joined Slipknot as the special guest at their show at the Olympic Stadium (Moscow). Following that, on the band's tenth anniversary, they went on their "X Anniversary Tour," with their new vocalist [SLAVA] and former vocalist [IGOR] as a special guest. Before the tour, they released the internet single "Fragments 2.011" (Russian: Осколки 2.011). Later in the same year, Dmitry [JAY] Rubanovsky left the band.

In 2012, Ilya [K] Kukhin (ex – Such A Beautiful Day, The Wheels Of Sorrow) was officially announced as the new guitarist. With him [AMATORY] released three singles: Three Stripes (Russian: Три Полоски) ft. Animal Jazz, Believe Me (Russian: Верь Мне), and The Moment Of Truth (Russian: Момент Истины).

On June 13, 2012, [AMATORY] announced upcoming suspension of its activities on their official website, explaining that the muscians were no longer able to go on long tours. However, they announced a final tour called "The Last Concert?" (Russian: Последний Концерт?)/"Never Say Never".At this point, Alexander [ALEX] Pavlov left the band and was replaced for the tour by session guitarist Ilya [EEL] Borisov (Russian: Илья Борисов), who later became a permanent member of the band. On September 8, 2012, the band released their second concert DVD "The X-Files: Live In Saint-P & On The Road 2011–2012".

On January 1, 2013, after the end of "Never Say Never"/"The Last Concert?" tour, [AMATORY] went on hiatus.

=== 2014—2018: 6 ===
In the beginning of 2013 [STEWART] became fascinated with electronic music, and co-founded a trap music (EDM)/bass electronic project called "FatSound Brothers," with Dmitriy Muzychenko (Russian: Дмитрий Музыченко; ex-Naily) and Taras Umansky (Russian: Тарас Уманский) from Stigmata. Muzychenko wrote some music compositions for this project, that would later become the basis for [AMATORY]'s new album.

On January 30, 2015, the team performed a new song called "Stop The Time" (Russian: Остановить Время) at the Stars Fucktory Festival, it was released as a single on June 15, 2015. Four days later a music video for this song premiered on the official amatorytube YouTube channel.

On October 6, 2015, [AMATORY] released their sixth studio album titled 6 with [SLAVA] on vocals. The band had been working on new material for two years, experimenting with different sounds, until they felt that they had found something worth sharing.

On March 15, 2016, they released a studio music video for the song "15/03" dedicated to Osechkin.

A week later the band premiered a neo-noir music video for the song "The First" (Russian: Первый).

On October 12, 2016, [AMATORY] released their third EP Fire (Russian: Огонь). It consisted of three tracks, one of which was recorded with Russian rapper ATL.

In December 2017, [AMATORY] collaborated with Russian rapper Bumble Beezy at the Jager Music Awards. This collaboration resulted in a maxi-single "Original Go Getter/Original Go Getter (Rock Version)" released in March 2018.

On March 11, 2018, Vyascheslav Sokolov was dismissed from the band, due to unprofessional behavior and his heavy drinking. The final straw was his inappropriate behavior towards band during the TV Project Songs on TnT (Russian: Песни на ТНТ).

=== 2019 — present: DOOM ===
On March 29, 2019, [AMATORY] unexpectedly released a single "Space Kamikaze" (Russian: Космо-камикадзе) with a new anonymous vocalist, whose face was covered by a mask. The song was inspired by the band's discontent with the Russian political climate.

On July 5, a second single titled "Knife" (Russian: Нож), recorded with Russian rapper Dirty "RAM" Ramirez, was released and a lyrics video for this song was published on the official amatorytube YouTube channel. A few days later the band announced a live broadcast on VKontakte and posted another photo with the new singer, now unmasked, who was revealed to be Sergei [RAEV] Raev (a member of Obscure of Acacia, Triumphant, also known for working with Shokran and Sumatra). He became an official vocalist of the band.

The seventh studio album DOOM with Raev and Ilya [EEL] Borisov on vocals was released on October 18, 2019. It is a concept album with cold sombre atmosphere, focusing on dark aspects of human nature such as gluttony, greed, and sloth and the dangerous actions that lead to global disasters. An imaginary hero of the album wanders around various "post-apocalyptic zones," areas affected by real-life catastrophes. The songs all deal with sensitive topics: Cherno (Russian: Черно) is dedicated to the Chernobyl disaster, and inspired by the HBO miniseries Chernobyl; Locusts (Russian: Саранча) was inspired by the major 2019 wildfires in Russia and other countries; Angel 141 (Russian: Ангел 141) is dedicated to the Russian submarine Kursk (K-141) (Russian: Атомная Подводная Лодка "Курск") that sank in the Barents Sea on August 12, 2000, killing all 118 personnel on board.

On April 17, 2020, the band released 2 instrumental albums: "The Unvoiced Pt. I (6 Instrumental)", "The Unvoiced Pt. III (DOOM Instrumental)", and an instrumental EP "The Unvoiced Pt. II (Fire Instrumental)".

During DOOM sessions the band recorded 23 demos but only 10 of them were chosen under the concept of the album. On December 31, 2019, [AMATORY] announced a New Years song competition, "We Play – You Sing," to write the lyrics for one of the instrumental pieces that had been rejected from the album.

== Members ==
Current

- Daniil [STEWART] Svetlov – drums (since 1998), samples, programming (2001–2012)
- Dmitriy [HELLDIMM] Muzychenko – guitars, keyboards, programming, samples (since 2015)
- Ilya [EEL] Borisov – guitars (since 2012), additional vocals (since 2015), keyboards, programming, samples (since 2019)
- Denis [DENVER] Zhivotovsky – bass (since 1998), unclean vocals, clean vocals (since 2001)

Past

- Evgeniy "PJ" Potekhin – guitars, lead vocals (1998–2001)
- Aleksey "Liolik" Skornyakov – samples (2002)
- Aleksey "Lexus" Ovchinnikov – rapping vocals (2001–2004)
- Sergey [GANG] Osechkin – guitars (2001–2007 †)
- Igor [IGOR] Kapranov – unclean vocals, rapping vocals (2004–2010, 2011–2012, as a special guest on tour since 2021), samples (2004)
- Dmitriy [JAY] Rubanovskiy – guitars (2008–2011)
- Aleksandr [ALEX] Pavlov – guitars, keyboards, programming, samples (2003–2012)
- Ilya [K] Kukhin – guitars (2011–2014)
- Vyacheslav [SLAVA] Sokolov – lead vocals (2010–2018)
- Sergei [RAEV] Raev – lead vocals (2019-2024)

== Discography ==
=== Studio albums ===
- 2003 – Вечно Прячется Судьба (Fortune's Always Hiding)
- 2004 – Неизбежность (Inevitability)
- 2006 – Книга Мёртвых (Book of The Dead)
- 2008 – VII
- 2010 – Инстинкт Обречённых (Instinct of the Doomed)
- 2015 – 6
- 2019 – DOOM
- 2026 -- одержимость (Obsession)

=== Singles ===
- 2003 – Осколки (Fragments)
- 2004 – Две Жизни (Two Lives)
- 2005 – Чёрно-Белые Дни (Black and White Days)
- 2006 – Преступление Против Времени (Crime Against Time)
- 2007 – Слишком Поздно (Too Late)
- 2008 – Вы Все Лишены Своей Жизни (The All of You are Deprived of Your Lives)
- 2008 – Дыши Со Мной (Breathe with Me)
- 2009 – Багровый Рассвет (Crimson Dawn)
- 2010 – Сквозь Закрытые Веки (Through Closed Eyelids)
- 2011 – Осколки 2.011 (Fragments 2.011)
- 2012 – Три Полоски (The Three Stripes) (featuring Animal Jazz)
- 2012 – Верь Мне (Believe Me)
- 2012 – Момент Истины (The Moment of Truth)
- 2015 – Остановить Время (Stop The Time)
- 2018 – Original Go Getter/Original Go Getter (Rock Version) (featuring Bumble Beezy)
- 2019 – Космо-камикадзе (Space Kamikadze)
- 2019 – Нож (The Knife) (featuring RAM)
- 2020 – Родина (Motherland), a tribute to DDT
- 2020 – I Sing You Pay (featuring Miroshland)
- 2021 – Снег в Аду 2.021 (A Snow in the Hell 2.021)
- 2023 – Анестезия (Anesthesia) (featuring Neverlove)

=== Live albums ===
- 2008 – Live Evil
- 2012 – The X-Files
- 2021 – All Stars: Live in Moscow

=== Instrumental Albums ===
- 2020 – The Unvoiced Pt. I ("6" Instrumental)
- 2020 – The Unvoiced Pt. III ("DOOM" Instrumental)

=== EP ===
- 2002 – Хлеб (The Bread) feat. SPERMADONARZ
- 2006 – Discovery
- 2016 – Огонь (Fire)
- 2023 – ВПС 2023 (FAH 2023)

=== Instrumental EP ===
- 2009 – We Play – You Sing
- 2010 – We Play – You Sing Pt. 2
- 2011 – We Play – You Sing Pt. 3
- 2020 – The Unvoiced Pt. II ("Fire" Instrumental)

=== DVD ===
- 2005 – [P]OST [S]CRIPTUM
- 2007 – Home Video EVol. 01
- 2008 – Live Evil
- 2012 – The X-Files: Live In Saint-P & On The Road 2011–2012
- 2021 – ALL STARS: LIVE IN MOSCOW 2021

== Videos ==
Russian

- 2003: Осколки (Fragments)
- 2004: Чёрно-Белые Дни (Black and White Days)
- 2006: Преступление Против Времени (Crime Against Time)
- 2006: Преступление Против Времени (Alternative Version) (Crime Against Time (Alternative Version))
- 2007: Эффект Бабочки (Butterfly Effect)
- 2009: Дыши Со Мной (Breathe With Me)
- 2009: Багровый Рассвет (Crimson Dawn)
- 2011: Стеклянные Люди (Glass People)
- 2011: Сквозь Закрытые Веки (Through Closed Eyelids)
- 2011: Осколки 2.011 (Fragments 2.011)
- 2015: Остановить Время (Stop The Time)
- 2016: Первый (The First)
- 2019: Звёздная Грязь (Star Dust)
- 2021: Снег в Аду 2.021 (A Snow in the Hell 2.021)

English

- 2009: Just One More Day (unofficial)
- 2009: Your Life In My Eyes (unofficial)

== Concert tours ==
- Screamin and Growlin Tour (October 2004 — August 2005)
- We Play You Die Tour (August 2005 — February 2006)
- Discovery Tour (February — April 2006)
- Rock 5 Tour (April — June 2006)
- Escape from the Studio Tour (July — August 2006)
- Live Evil Tour (October 2006 — August 2007)
- Saint Seventh Tour (September 2007 — December 2008)
- Sold Out Tour (February — August 2009)
- Sick&Loud Tour (October — December 2009)
- Инстинкт обречённых Tour (2010–2011)
- X Anniversary Tour (September 2011 — March 2012)
- Never Say Never Tour/The Last Concert? (September — December 2012)
- 6 Tour (September 2015 — January 2016)
- 15 лет вне времени (April — December 2016)
- Best of the Best Show (October — November 2017)
- Doom Tour (November — December 2019)
- [AMA20RY] All Stars (April 2021 — October 2022)
- You Vote We Play (October — November 2022)

== Awards ==
=== Russian Music Awards ===
- St. Petersburg Alternative Music Awards – 08.04.2005 : "Best music video for "Black and White Days"; "Best Album" for "Inevitability"
- FUZZ People's Choice Award – 09.04.2005 : "Best Band"
- RAMP (Russian Alternative Music Prize) 2005 : "Best Band", "Best Music Video" for "Black and White Days" – 22.09.2005
- FUZZ Award 2008 : "Best Alternative Band"
- Metal Planet Awards – 15.06.2008 : People's Choice "Best Band"
- RAMP 2009 : "Best Song" for "Breathe With Me" – 29.10.2009

== Literature ==
- Алексеев А. С. Кто есть кто в российской рок-музыке. — М. : АСТ : Астрель : Харвест, 2009. — С. 52, 53. — ISBN 978-5-17-048654-0 (АСТ). — ISBN 978-5-271-24160-4 (Астрель). — ISBN 978-985-16-7343-4 (Харвест).
- Кузовлев А. Чёрно-белые дни. Вся правда о группе [AMATORY]. — СПб.: «Амфора», 2010. — 512 с. ISBN 978-5-367-01300-9.
