= Splean =

Russian rock band

Splean Сплин
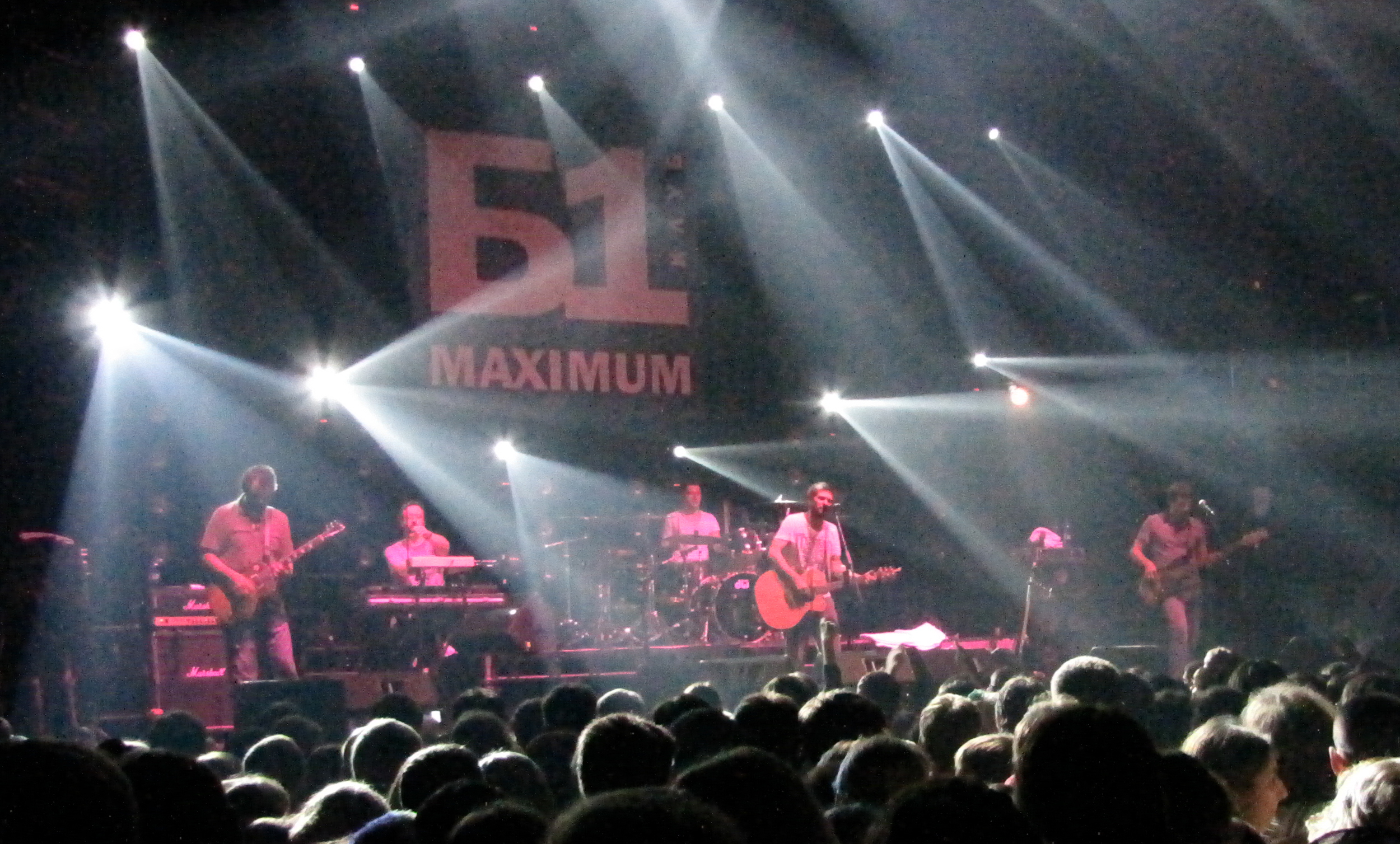
- Splean at B1 Maximum, Moscow, 2010.

Background information
- Origin: Saint Petersburg, Russia
- Genres: Alternative rock, Acoustic rock, Indie rock, Progressive rock, Folk rock, Russian rock, Pop-rock
- Years active: May 27, 1994 – present
- Labels: Frost Records, Sound Product, Mystery of Sound
- Spinoffs: SEtI, Oedipus Complex, Bi-2, Year of the Rat
- Members: Alexander Vasilyev; Vadim Sergeyev; Dmitry Kunin; Nikolay Rostovsky; Alexey Mesherekov
- Past members: Alexander Morozov; Stas Berezovsky; Nikolay Lysov; Yan Nikolenko; Sergei Navetny; Nikolay Voronov

Splean (Russian: Сплин, romanized: Splin) is a popular Russian rock band, formed in Saint Petersburg in 1994. Since then, they have remained one of the most popular rock bands in Russia and the former Soviet Union. The band's name is derived from "spleen" (in the sense of "depression"), and the "ea" spelling in English is a pun on the spelling of the Beatles. It was borrowed from a short poem by Sasha Cherny, which the band set to music.

== History ==
Lead singer Alexander Vasilyev and bass guitarist Alexander Morozov decided to form a band together while working in "Buff" theatre as stage workers. Later, keyboardist Nikolay Rostovsky and other musicians joined them. Despite the risk of losing their jobs, they began recording their first album Pyl'naja byl' (Dusty Fact) in one of the theatre's studios at night. Their growing popularity was made evident by Boris Grebenshchikov's and Konstantin Kinchev's support. In 1996, the band began to play concerts in Moscow and other cities.

Despite rumours that the group were on the verge of breaking up in 2004, Splean continues to perform throughout Russia and the world. The band frequently experiments and evolves, so the current version of Splean is quite different from its original version.

In 1998, Splean opened for The Rolling Stones at Moscow's Luzhniki Stadium, during the Bridges to Babylon Tour. Splean headlined the Krylya rock festival in 2005 and Nashestvie in 2015.

The band won several Nashe Radio "Chart Dozen" awards, including Best Song and Chart Leader for "Orkestr" ("Оrchestra") in 2015 and Best Album for Obman Zrenija (Optical Illusion) in 2013.

== Members ==
- Alexander Vasilyev - lead vocals, guitar
- Vadim Sergeyev - guitar
- Dmitriy Kunin - bass-guitar
- Nikolay Rostovsky - keyboards
- Alexey Mesherekov - drums

== Discography ==
Year	Russian	Translit.	English
1994	Пыльная Быль	Pyl'naja Byl	Dusty Fact
1996	Коллекционер Оружия	Kollekcioner Oruzhija	Arms Collector
1997	Фонарь под Глазом	Fonar' pod Glazom	Black Eye, lit. Lamp Under the Eye
1998	Гранатовый Альбом	Granatovyj Al'bom	Pomegranate Album
1999	Альтависта	Al'tavista	Altavista
1999	Зн@менатель (сборник песен для радио)	Zn@menatel' (sbornik pesen dlja radio)	Denomin@tor (collection of songs for the radio)
2000	Альтависта live	Al'tavista live	Altavista Live
2001	25 кадр	25 kadr	25th Frame
2002	Акустика	Akustika	Unplugged
2003	Новые Люди	Novye Ljudi	New People
2004	Реверсивная Хроника Событий	Reversivnaja Hronika Sobytij	Reversed Chronicle of Events
2007	Раздвоение Личности	Razdvoenie Lichnosti	Split Personality
2009	Сигнал из Космоса	Signal iz Kosmosa	Signal From Space
2012	Обман Зрения	Obman Zrenija	Optical Illusion
2014	Резонанс. Часть 1	Rezonans. Chast' 1	Resonance. Part 1
2014	Резонанс. Часть 2	Rezonans. Chast' 2	Resonance. Part 2
2016	Ключ к шифру	Kljuch k shifru	Key to the Cipher
2018	Встречная полоса	Vstrechnaja polosa	Opposite Lane
2019	Тайком	Taikom	Sneakingly
2020	Вира и майна	Vira i majna	Up and down

== Soundtracks ==
- 2000 - Брат 2 (Brother 2) — "Линия жизни" (Life Line)
- 2001 - Тайный знак (Secret Sign) - "Моё сердце" (My Heart), "Пластмассовая жизнь" (Plastic Life)
- 2002 - Война (War) - "SOS", "Феллини" (Fellini), "Пластмассовая жизнь" (Plastic Life)
- 2004 - Егерь - Сломано всё (Everything is Broken), "Время, назад!" (Time, Backwards!)
- 2006 - Живой (Alive) - "Сиануквиль" (Sihanoukville), "Романс" (Romance)
- 2008 - Качели (Swing) - "Мама миа" (Mama Mia), "Мобильный" (Mobile)
- 2012 - Отпуск (Vacation) - "Романс" (Romance)
- 2013 - Посредник (Mediator) - "Время, назад!" (Time, Backwards!)
- Grand Theft Auto IV - Линия жизни (Life Line) on radio station Vladivostok FM
