= Va-Bank =

Georgian television series

- Georgian: ვა-ბანკი
- Presented by: Misha Mshvildadze; Duta Skhirtladze
- Country of origin: Georgia

Production
- Running time: 50 minutes (with commercials)

Original release
- Network: Rustavi 2 (2009-)
- Release: November 11, 2008 – June 23, 2009

Va-Bank (Georgian alphabet: ვა-ბანკი, transliterated as "va-banki") is the Georgian version of Deal or No Deal. It was shown on Rustavi 2 from November 11, 2008 to June 23, 2009 and hosted by Misha Mshvildadze.

This show uses the music of the American version, the set is also similar to that version. There are 26 models, each carries a briefcase containing prizes between 0.01 lari (about 0.6¢ US) and 50,000 lari (about US$21,500).

On February 3, 2009, two Georgian soccer players, Rezo and Archil Arveladze, won the top prize.

== Case values ==
0.01	1,000
1	1,500
5	2,500
10	3,000
25	4,000
50	5,000
100	6,000
150	7,500
200	10,000
300	15,000
400	20,000
500	30,000
750	50,000

Model with the 50.000lari case
