= Chaif =

Russian rock band

Chaif (Чайф)
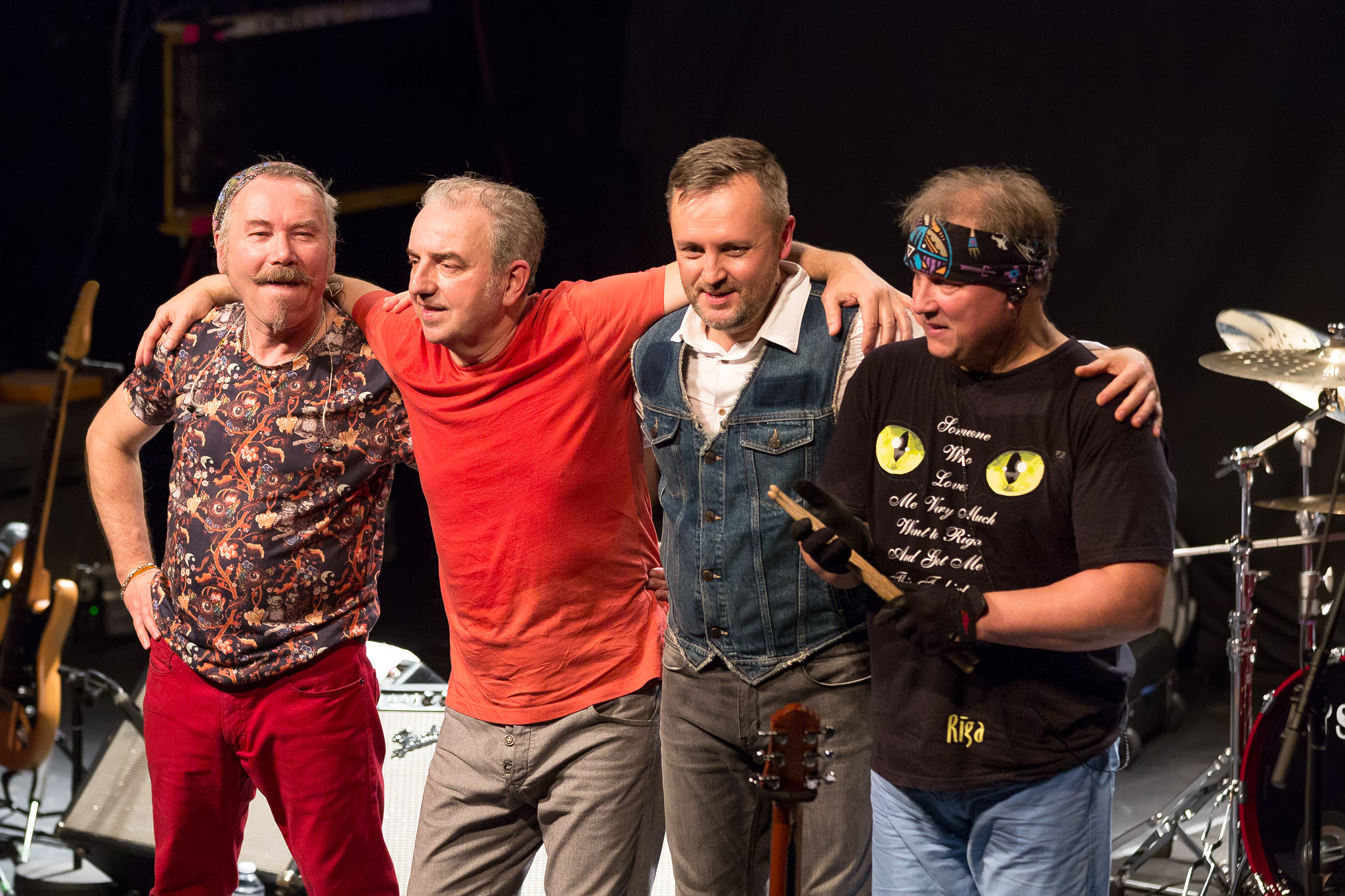
- Concert in Toronto (Nov 2017)

Background information
- Origin: Sverdlovsk (Yekaterinburg), USSR (Russia)
- Genres: rock, blues rock, reggae, rock and roll, punk rock(early)
- Years active: 1985–present
- Label: Nikitin
- Members: Vladimir Shakhrin, Vladimir Begunov, Valery Severin, Vyacheslav Dvinin
- Past members: Vadim Kukushkin, Silas Warren, Vladimir Nazimov, Igor Zlobin, Alina Nifanteva, Anton Nifantev, Vladimir Privalov, Vladimir Zheltovskih, Pavel Ustyugov
- Website: chaif.ru

Chaif (Чайф) is a Russian rock band formed in 1984 in Sverdlovsk (now Yekaterinburg), Russia, by Vladimir Shakhrin and Vladimir Begunov. Their name is derived from the word chai, meaning tea, and kaif (slang word), meaning pleasure. The band became known in 1992 with songs such as Rocknroll etoi nochi (Rock'n'roll this night) and Nikto ne uslishit (Nobody will hear). By 1997, the popularity of rock music had declined and they were playing smaller venue. They have released several albums. Their musical styles range from rock and roll to Blues and some songs which feature a strong reggae influence. The band in 2008 was still touring and releasing albums occasionally.

After the annexation of Crimea by the Russian Federation, Chaif took part in cultural meeting between delegations from Crimea and Sverdlovsk Oblast. The lead singer of the band, Vladimir Shakhrin, was critical of Andrey Makarevich for supporting Ukraine's position in the conflict. In 2022, the band released a statement blaming both sides for the Russian invasion of Ukraine while providing material support to Russian troops in Ukraine and expressing distaste towards musicians that had left Russia following the start of the conflict.

== Discography ==
=== Magnitoalbums ===
Year	Original title	Translated title
1985	Жизнь в розовом дыму	Life in a pink smoke
1986	Субботним вечером в Свердловске	Saturday evening in Sverdlovsk
1988	Лучший город Европы	The best city in Europe

=== Studio albums ===
Year	Original title	Translated title
1987	Дерьмонтин	Leathercrap
1987	Дуля с маком	Nuts to you
1989	Не беда	It doesn't matter
1990	Давай вернёмся	Let's return
1991	Четвёртый стул	The Fourth chair
1993	Дети гор	Children of mountains
1995	Пусть всё будет так, как ты захочешь	Let everything be as you want
1996	Реальный мир	Real world
1999	Шекогали	Shekogali
2000	Симпатии	Sympathies
2001	Время не ждёт	Time doesn't wait
2003	48	48
2004	Изумрудные хиты (с ансамблем "Изумруд")	Emerald hits (collaboration with Izumrud ensemble)
2006	От себя	From myself
2009	Свой/Чужой	Friend/Foe
2013	Кино, вино и домино	Cinema, wine and dominoes
2017	Теория струн	String theory
2019	Слова на бумаге	Words on paper
2025	Вот так	Just like that

=== The Oranzhevoye Nastroenie series ===
Year	Original title	Translated title
1994	Оранжевое настроение	Orange mood
1996	Оранжевое настроение — II	Orange mood — II
2002	Оранжевое настроение — IV	Orange mood — IV
2008	Оранжевое настроение — V	Orange mood — V
2021	Оранжевое настроение — III	Orange mood — III

=== Live albums ===
Year	Original title	Translated title
1995	Концерт	Concert
2000	Чайф 15 лет	Chaif 15 years
2005	Чайф 20 лет	Chaif 20 years
2010	Чайф. 25 лет выдержки	Chaif. 25 years old
2011	Зимняя Акустика. Снежные сны	Winter acoustic. Snow dreams

=== Compilations ===
Year	Original title	Translated title
1997	Акустические версии	Acoustic versions
1998	Best of ЧАЙФ	Best of Chaif
1998	Легенды русского рока. Чайф	Legends of Russian rock. Chaif
1998	Избранное	Selected
2009	25 лет выдержки	25 years old
2009	Лучшие песни (2CD)	Best songs
