= Picnic (band) =

Russian rock band

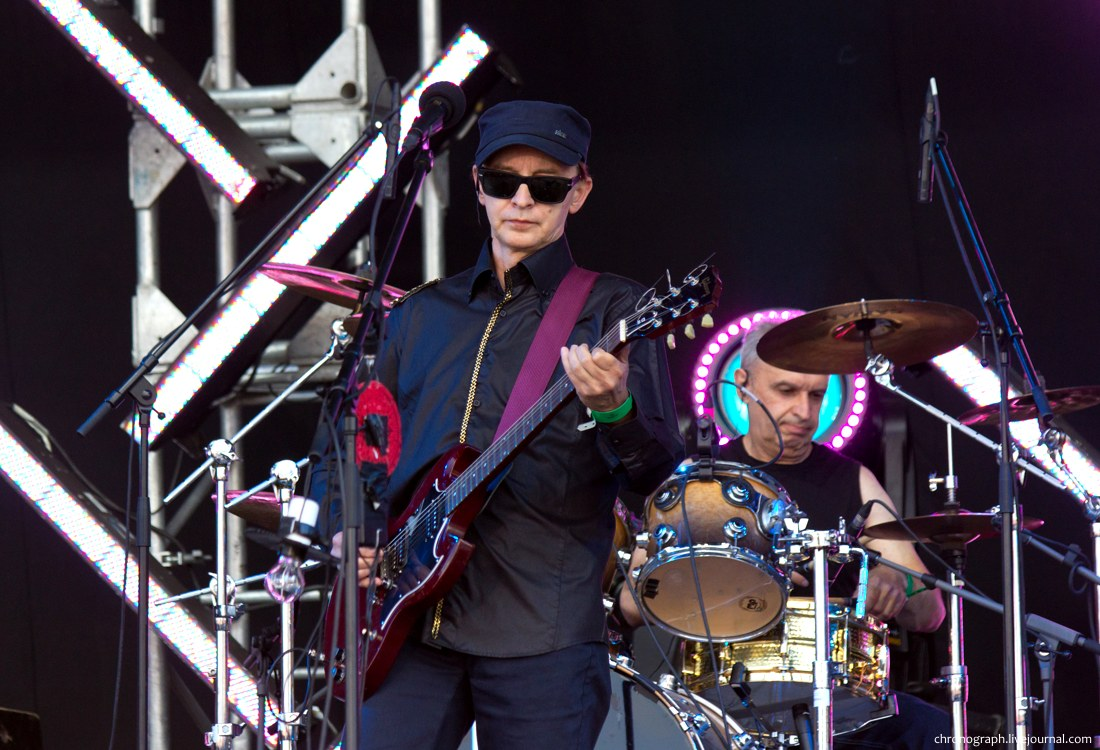
- Frontman Edmund Shklyarskiy in 2013

Background information
- Origin: Leningrad, Soviet Union
- Genres: Art rock; progressive rock; psychedelic rock; new wave; post-punk; space rock; gothic rock; folk rock
- Years active: 1978–present
- Members: Edmund Shklyarskiy; Leonid Kirnos; Marat Korchemny; Stanislav Shklyarskiy; Ilgiz Yunusov
- Past members: See band members
- Website: piknik.info

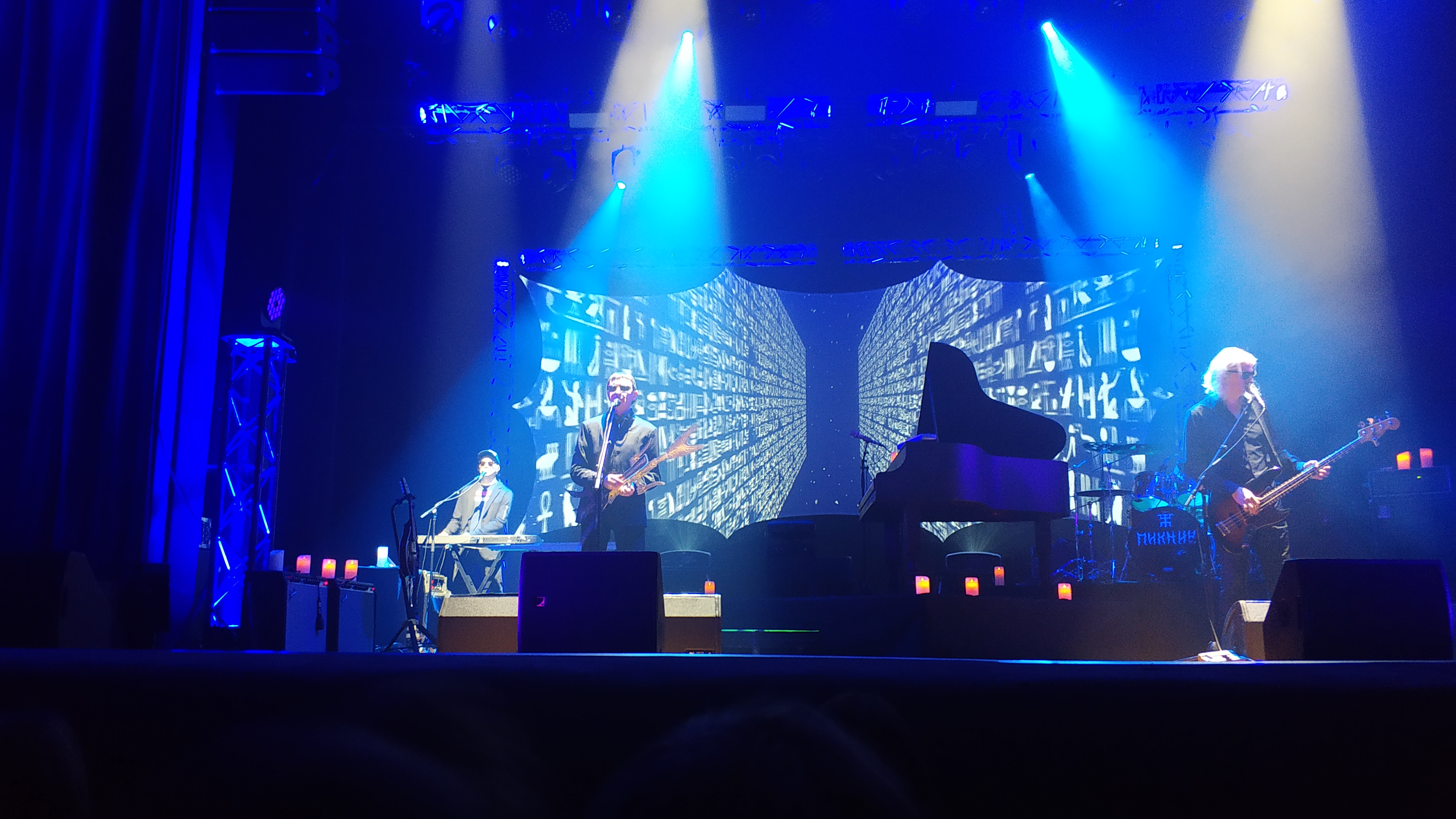
Picnic in concert at Ramenskoye, 2022

Picnic (Russian: Пикник), also transliterated as Piknik, is a Russian rock band formed in 1978 in Leningrad (now Saint Petersburg). Known for their blend of art, progressive, gothic, and Russian rock, they are considered a cult phenomenon in Russian music. The group's defining era began in 1981, with the arrival of frontman, guitarist, and primary songwriter Edmund Shklyarskiy. Picnic is highly regarded for their elaborate, theatrical live performances, which often feature custom-built and unconventional instruments.

The band has faced significant tragedies in recent years. In March 2018, several members were severely injured in a tour bus crash near Gus-Khrustalny. On 22 March 2024, they were scheduled to perform at Crocus City Hall in Krasnogorsk, when a terrorist attack occurred, resulting in the death of the band's administrator, Ekaterina Kushner.

== History ==
=== Formation and early years (1978–1981) ===
Picnic was formed in September 1978 as a student band at the Leningrad Polytechnic Institute. Its lineup included Sergey Omelnichenko (guitar, vocals), Evgeny Voloshchuk (bass), and Alexei Dobychin (vocals), and they began playing local gigs.

=== Breakthrough with Shklyarskiy (1981–1989) ===
Picnic's trajectory changed significantly in 1981, when Edmund Shklyarskiy joined as the frontman and principal songwriter. His distinct vocal style, philosophical lyrics, and guitar work steered the band toward art rock and psychedelic rock. In 1982, with the help of Boris Grebenshchikov of Aquarium and producer Andrei Tropillo, Picnic recorded their debut album, Dym. It was distributed via magnitizdat (underground tape trading) and quickly gained popularity across the Soviet Union, establishing Picnic as a major act in the Leningrad Rock Club.

During the mid-to-late 1980s, the band experimented with their sound, occasionally incorporating synthesizers and drum machines to achieve a more commercial, pop-oriented style in order to fund their own equipment. They eventually returned to their roots, emphasizing guitar-driven art rock and symphonic arrangements, culminating in the release of their classic 1986 album, Iyeroglif, on the state-owned Melodiya label.

=== Theatrical live shows and post-Soviet era (1990s–2010s) ===
In the 1990s, Shklyarskiy began designing highly unconventional, custom-built instruments into the band's live shows. These included a "living cello" (strings and pickups attached to a performer's body), an "Egyptian" Moog-based synthesizer with a massive lever, a circular saw with magnetic pickups, and various robotic and pyrotechnic stage props. The band's concerts evolved into theatrical experiences, drawing on themes of mysticism, Gothic literature, and carnival aesthetics.

Despite shifting trends in Russian rock, Picnic maintained a dedicated, multi-generational fanbase and continued to release critically acclaimed albums, such as Zhen-Shen (1996), Mrakobesiye i Dzhazz (2007), and Zhelezniye Mantry (2008).

=== 2016 Ukrainian ban ===
In 2016, the band was barred from playing in Ukraine due to their performance in Crimea after it was annexed by Russia.

=== 2018 tour bus crash ===
On 16 March 2018, the band's tour microbus was involved in a severe head-on collision with a Honda CR-V on a highway near Gus-Khrustalny, Vladimir Oblast. The bus, carrying the musicians from a concert in Vladimir to a scheduled show in Ryazan, was thrown off the road into a ditch due to black ice on the road surface. Several band members and crew were hospitalized with varying degrees of injuries, including suspected spinal fractures. The band was forced to cancel their ongoing tour, which was set to include dates across Russia and Kazakhstan.

=== 2024 Crocus City Hall attack and aftermath ===
On 22 March 2024, Picnic was scheduled to perform with a symphony orchestra at Crocus City Hall in Krasnogorsk, just outside Moscow. Before the band could take the stage, armed terrorists stormed the venue, opening fire on the crowd and starting a massive fire that destroyed the building. While the band members survived the attack, their director's assistant, Ekaterina Kushner, was killed.

Despite the tragedy, the band did not cancel their upcoming 27 March concert in Saint Petersburg, dedicating the performance to the victims and donating the proceeds to those affected. The band also continued their the Future Awaits Us tour, which concluded in April 2024.

=== 45th anniversary (2024–present) ===
In July 2024, the band released the studio album Odin na odin. The supporting tour began in September and concluded in May 2025. Later that year, the band embarked on a tour to celebrate their 45th anniversary as well as the release of their debut album. In September 2025, a remastered version of Dym was issued, featuring the original 1982 arrangements, the participation of the band's founding members, and two previously unreleased tracks.

== Musical style and stage presence ==
The music critic Andrei Burlaka has described Picnic as a "cult phenomenon" in Russian rock music. The band's sound is a blend of art rock, progressive rock, gothic rock, and psychedelic rock, often infused with elements of Russian folk music. Shklyarskiy's lyrics frequently explore themes of mysticism, existentialism, and surrealism. Some of their songs have been recorded in Polish, reflecting Shklyarskiy's paternal heritage, including a 2019 collaboration on the track "Sontse zakhavalos", with the Russian band Sonce-Khmary.

Picnic are also known for their elaborate stage shows. Rejecting the standard "rock concert" format, Shklyarskiy has described their performances as a "show" in the truest sense of the word. The band frequently utilizes bespoke instruments, such as the aforementioned "living cello" and electrified industrial tools, alongside elaborate lighting, costumes, and stage actors (such as performers on stilts or mime artists), creating an atmosphere reminiscent of a dark carnival or a theatrical production.

== Band members ==
Current

- Edmund Shklyarskiy – vocals, guitars, keyboards, custom instruments (1981–present)
- Leonid Kirnos – drums, percussion (1982–1984, 1987–present; temporarily inactive since 2023, due to injury)
- Marat Korchemny – backing vocals, bass (2003–present)
- Stanislav Shklyarskiy – keyboards (2007–present)
- Ilgiz Yunusov – drums (2023–present)

Past

- Alexei Dobychin – vocals (1978–1983, 2025)
- Evgeny Voloshchuk – bass guitar (1978–1984, 1985, 2025)
- Sergey Omelnichenko – guitar, vocals (1978–1981)
- Nikolai Mikhailov – flute, saxophone (1978–1981)
- Alexander Matskov – drums (1978)
- Alexander Kondrashkin – drums (1978–1979, 1980)
- Yuri Danilov – flute, clarinet (1979–1981)
- Alexander Yevseev – drums (1979)
- Nikolai Korzinin – drums (1979–1980)
- Pyotr Troshchenkov – drums (1980–1981)
- Pavel Kondratenko – keyboards (1980)
- Alexei Malkov – keyboards (1980)
- Mikhail Panaev – vocals (1980–1981)
- Alexander Savelyev – guitar (1981–1990)
- Sharifzhan Abdulov – drums (1981)
- Ali Bakhtiyarov – drums (1981–1983)
- Viktor Morozov – drums (1982)
- Vadim Lebanidze – keyboards (1983)
- Sergei Shepel – guitar (1983)
- Vladimir Sizov – bass (1984, 1989–1990)
- Viktor Sergeev – keyboards (1984)
- Sergei Voronin – keyboards (1984, 1986–2006)
- Alexander Fedorov – drums (1984)
- Viktor Evseev – bass guitar, backing vocals (1985–1988, 1990–1996), keyboards (2007)
- Yuri Klyuchantsev – keyboards, saxophone, percussion (1986–1988, 1990–1996)
- Vadim Ponomaryov – drums (1986–1987)
- Andrey Merchansky – guitar (1990–1994)
- Alexander Rokin – bass guitar, backing vocals (1996–1999)
- Svyatoslav Obraztsov – bass guitar, backing vocals (1999–2003)

== Discography ==
Year	Title	Notes
1982	Дым	
1984	Танец волка	
1986	Иероглиф	
1988	Родом ниоткуда	
1991	Харакири	
1994	Немного огня	
1995	Вампирские песни	with vocalist Andrey Karpenko
1996	Жень-шень	
1997	Стекло	
1998	Пить электричество	with the fictional group Sekta MO
2001	Египтянин	
2002	Чужой	
2003	Говорит и показывает	
2004	Тень вампира	Joint project with Vadim Samoylov
2005	Королевство кривых	
2007	Мракобесие и джаз	
2008	Железные мантры	
2010	Театр абсурда	
2011	Три судьбы	
2012	Певец декаданса	
2014	Чужестранец	
2017	Искры и канкан	
2019	В руках великана	
2022	Весёлый и злой	
2024	Один на один	
2025	Дым (Remaster)	1982 original arrangements with founding members
2026	Вечное движение	
