= Vladimir Begunov =

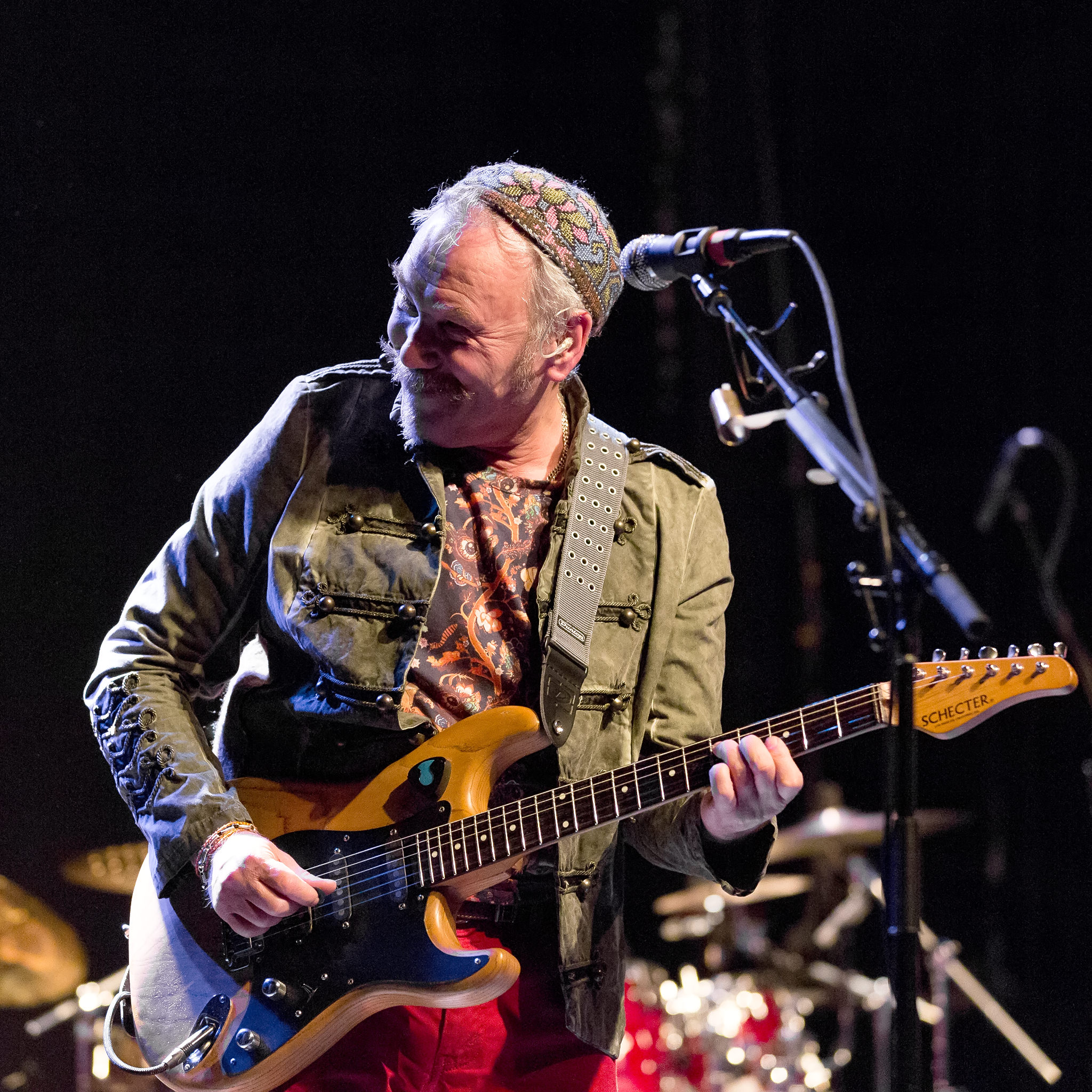
- Vladimir Begunov in Toronto (Nov. 2017)

Background information
- Born: 25 March 1959 (age 67); Gvardeyskoye, Simferopol raion, Crimean Oblast, USSR
- Origin: Sverdlovsk, Russia
- Genres: rock, country, reggae
- Occupations: musician, songwriter
- Instruments: guitar, bass
- Years active: 1985–present

Vladimir Sergeyevich Begunov (Russian: Владимир Сергеевич Бегунов; born 25 March 1959) is a Russian guitarist, songwriter, founder and permanent member of the Chaif band.

== Biography ==
Vladimir Begunov was born in the Crimean Oblast to a family of an accountant and an aircraft engineer. As a teenager his family moved to the small town Lakhta near Arkhangelsk. At that time he played in a Tsunami band. Among his favourite bands were The Beatles, The Rolling Stones, The Doors and T. Rex. When he was in 10 grade his family moved to Sverdlovsk, where he became Vladimir Shakhrin's classmate. In 1978–1980 he served in the Army reaching the military rank of a sergeant. In 1981 he graduated from Sverdlovsk building technical secondary school.

In 1985, he became a member of Chaif. He has also played the contrabass in Pyotr Beryozkin's country band.

Begunov played in the roles of the forest dryaba Bryaka in the radio play "Zhuzha. Drandalyot's travelling" which is based on Aleksandr Korotich's tale in 2009 and in that of the herald in a movie called "Legenda Ostrova Dvid" in 2010. Begunov was awarded the insignia of the Merit of Sverdlovskaja Oblast.
