= Tantsy Minus =

Russian rock band

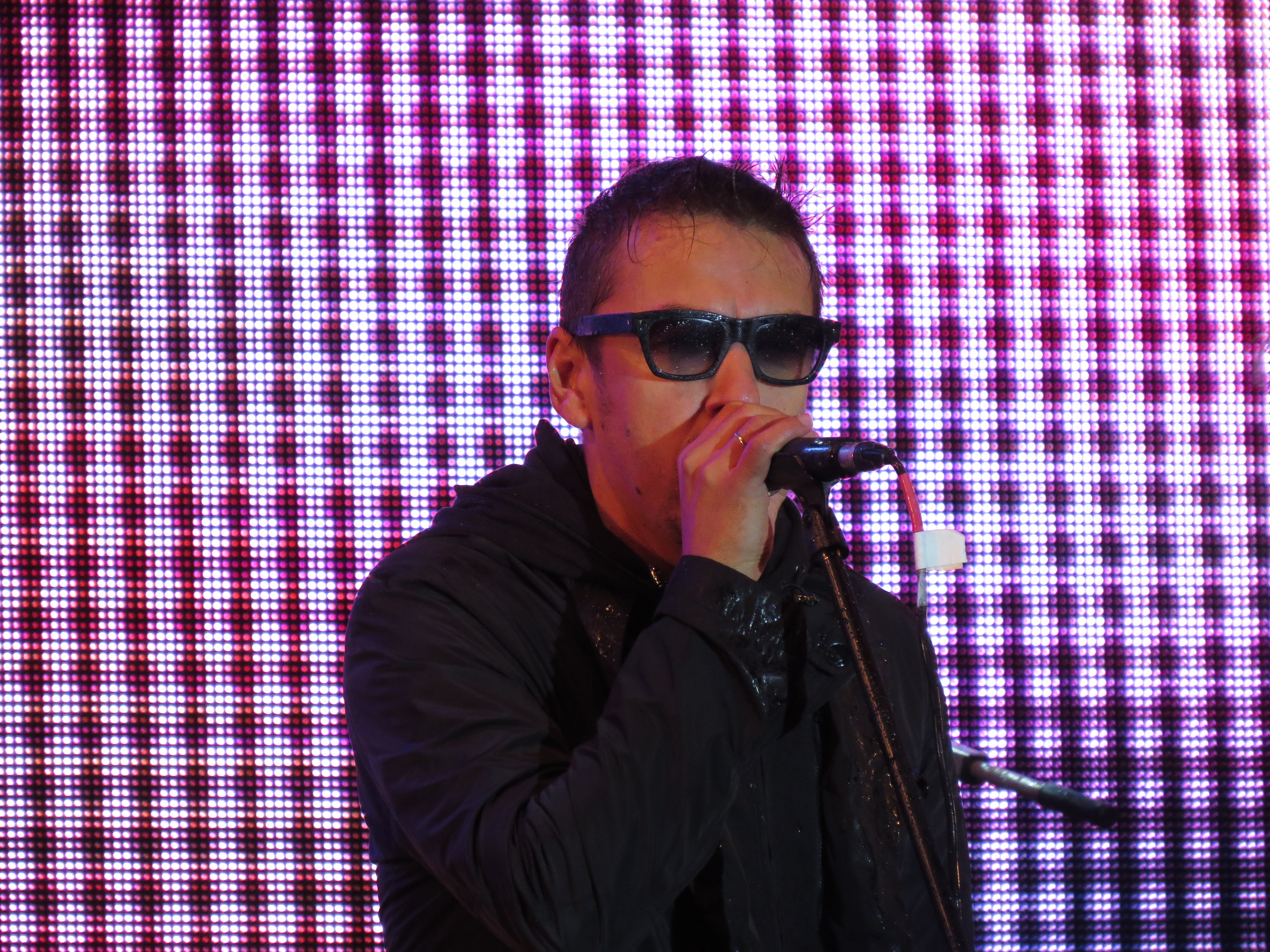
Tantsy Minus in 2013

Tantsy Minus (Russian: Танцы Минус, lit. 'Dances Minus') is a Russian rock band founded in 1995 by Vyacheslav Petkun. The group has won the Golden Gramophone Award three times (2000, 2001, 2009).
