= Nike Borzov =

Russian singer and musician (born 1972)

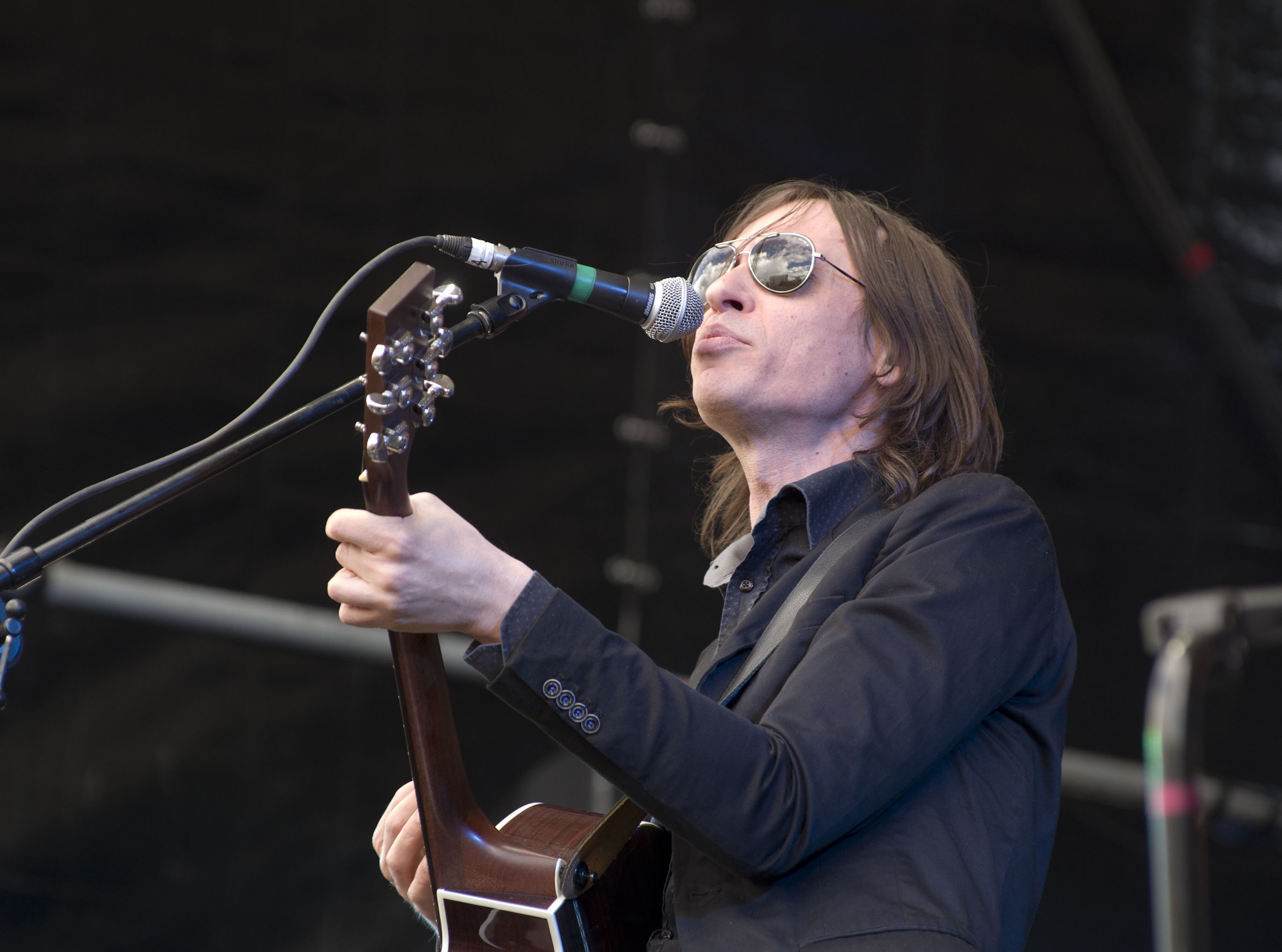

Background information
- Born: Nikolai Vladimirovitch Barashko; 23 May 1972 (age 54); Vidnoye, Moscow Oblast
- Occupation: Singer

Nike Borzov (Russian: Найк Борзов, born Nikolai Vladimirovitch Barashko, Russian: Николай Владимирович Барашко; 23 May 1972 in Vidnoe, Moscow Oblast) is a Russian singer and musician.

Borzov gained major popularity in 2000 after the popularity of the songs "Tri Slova" [Three Words] and "Loshadka" [Little Horse] (which was censored by some Russian radio stations due to the use of the word cocaine).

== Biography ==
At the age of 14, Nike organized a punk band Infection, which existed until 1992. The band recorded two full-length studio albums Masturbation in 1990 and Hole for the Navel in 1992.

In parallel, Nike took an active part in various projects (Mesopotamia, Platonic Prostitution, Buufet, Died, Special Nurses, Norman Bates Fan Club and others), and also spoke with Khui zabey. He served two years in the army: "I haven't learned nothing during this time, I have never even once fired my rifle, although I stood on duty with it and knew how to assemble and disassemble it".

He became more popular he left Infection, changing his style from punk to psychedelic rock.

In 1995, the magazine New Hot Rock described his work: "He sings extremely emotional and romantic songs of a kilometer length, burdened with arranging beauties, but generally inclined to the hysterical-melancholic stylistics The Cure. The core of the group is Nike himself and his drummer Lev Kostandian. One of the main hits is the eleven-minute hymn "Madness, Deceit and Little Piece of Love".

In 1997, along with the release of the album Puzzle, the song "The Horse" hit the rotation of the radio stations, provoking the public's anticipated interest and heated discussions. According to the plot of the composition, a small horse carries cocaine. In his own comments, the musician explains the meaning of the song: "A person drives themselves into certain frames, thinks out a certain order of things, which later can not change. He has responsibilities: a family that needs to be supported, work that you need to go to support a family, a dacha on which you need to do something every week, a car in which you have to pick one to go to that very dacha, etc. A man is a work horse, a horse man, a cart carrying his own happiness, a horse carrying cocaine." After several bans on the air, the word cocaine was replaced with different sounds and other words, for example clay, niacoc (cocaine on the contrary), which again was a win-win producer's move, as it attracted even more unhealthy interest of the public to "forbidden" and now encrypted topics. According to Nike, the song was written during army service and "was dictated by the circumstances in which I existed there." Nike claims that he did not try cocaine, but instead prefers sports and fishing. "I just used a word that I liked. It was possible to use any other "lines" in the song, but, in my opinion, cocaine fits better". In 2000, his fourth studio album, Superman was released.

After a fairly successful album Splinter, released in 2002, the singer for a few years fell silent, devoting himself to family and various outside projects. For example, in 2003 he performed the main role in the play Nirvana by Yuri Grymov, where he played Kurt Cobain.

In January 2008, the musician presented to the public the song "Wind", a fast melodic song with dark romantic lyrics, which Abanin Michael was immediately removed the video. The video got into the rotation of the TV channel "A-One", The Internet version of the video soon appeared on the website of the magazine Poster. In November 2008, he finished recording the original soundtrack to the audiobook of Hunter S. Thompson's Fear and Loathing in Las Vegas: A Savage Journey to the Heart of the American Dream, which he himself had announced in tandem with Arkhip Ahmeleevym.

== Name and pseudonym ==
In a 1998 episode of the programme Anthropology, Nike Borzov told Dmitry Dibrov that the name Nike was a pseudonym.

In a 2015 interview, Nike Borzov stated that he had been registered in his passport as Nike since birth; in a 2010 interview, he said that Nike Borzov was not a pseudonym, that Nike was an ordinary Native American name, and that his passport listed him as Nike Vladimirovich Borzov; in a 2017 interview, he said that from birth he had simply been called "baby" and that the name Nike had been invented by his father when the future musician was three years old. According to some sources, the name Nike was formed by combining different names; one version holds that it was derived from the names of Soviet rock musicians Mike Naumenko and Nick Rock-n-Roll. There are also claims that the singer officially changed his name to Borzov Nike Vladimirovich after ending his work with the band Infektsiya and shifting his style from punk to classic Russian rock. After that, the musician repeatedly stated in interviews that his parents had named him Nike at birth and that Borzov was his real surname.

== Influence ==
At the turn of the late 1990s and early 2000s, Nike Borzov was regarded as one of the most prominent representatives of indie rock in Russia, and after the success of the albums Golovolomka, Superman and Zanoza, he also became a notable pop performer. He is now regarded as a cult figure in Russian alternative music. The press dubbed him the "Russian Pete Doherty", in particular because of the lyrics of songs by the band Infektsiya, which itself became a cult act in the history of Russian punk. He is also highly regarded within the Russian underground music scene.

Borzov himself stated that the idea of forming his first rock band came to him in 1984, when he heard Joy Division's album Unknown Pleasures. He also claimed to have been one of the founders of the indie movement in Russian music. In 2010, his album Superman ranked 37th on the list of the "50 Best Russian Albums of All Time", compiled by Afisha magazine based on a survey of young Russian musicians.

== Discography ==
- Погружение [Pogruzheniye] (Submergence) (1992)
- Закрыто [Zakryto] (Closed) (1994)
- Головоломка [Golovolomka] (Puzzle) (1997)
- Супермен [Supermen] (Superman) (2000)
- Лошадка [Loshadka] (maxi-single, 2000)
- СупермEND [SupermEND] (2000)
- NUS in Am (2001)
- Заноза [Zanoza] (Splinter) (2002)
- Ради Любви [Radi Lyubvi] (For the Sake of Love) (2004)
- DVD 10 (1999–2003 clips compilation, 2005)
- Изнутри [Iznutri] (Internally) (2010)
- Радоваться [Radovatsya] (single) (Joy) (2010)
- Кислотный бог [Kislotniy bog] (Acid God) (2018)
- Капля крови создателя [Kaplya krovi sozdatelya] (A drop of the Creator's blood) (2020)

== See also ==
- MTV Russia Music Awards
