= Kirpichi =

Russian musical group

- Origin: Saint Petersburg, Russia
- Genres: Rapcore, hip-hop, hardcore punk, funk, stoner rock
- Labels: SHOCK-Records; Gala Records
- Members: Vasiliy Vasin - MC, guitar Danila Smirnov - MC, DJ, bass guitar Vadim Latyshev - MC, drums
- Past members: Evgeniy Nazarov (deceased) - MC, drums, Ivan Ludevig - guitar

Kirpichi (translated as 'Bricks') is an alternative music group from Russia. They originated in Saint Petersburg in the year 1995 as "Bricks are Heavy." Their last known setlist was at the venue Urban, located in Moscow, Russia in 2022.

== History ==
=== Early years and rise to fame ===
The groups may have started on May 15, 1995, when its founder Vasya V. (Vasiliy Vasin), with Stas Sytnik and Kirill Solovyev, played a first concert in the Petersburg's House of Pioneers. All the song lyrics were in English. Because of heavy membership turnover, they disbanded in 1996.

In May 1996, Vasya's father gave them money to record some tracks. He then made a deal with SHOCK Records, and soon they published the album Kirpichi tyazhely (Bricks are heavy), which was compiled from translated versions of previous songs.

In 1997 and 1998, the group toured, playing in many festivals and opening for Biohazard. As a result the album Smert' na reive (Death at the party) was published in 1999, under Gala Records. The recording of the third album was fast in spite of heavy alcohol and drug use by the group members. However, tragically, the week before the release, on February 18, 2000, drummer Evgeniy Nazarov died from an overdose.

== Discography ==
Album information
Live at Polygon
- Released: 1995
- Singles: -
Kirpichi Tyazhely (Bricks Are Heavy)
- Released: June 1996 (reissue September 19, 2000
- Singles: "Bajka"
Smert' Na Reive (Death At The Rave)
- Released: April 5, 1999
- Singles: "Pluyu ya"
Kapitalizm 00 (Capitalism 00)
- Released: November 18, 2000
- Singles: "Danila blues"
Sila Uma (The Power Of The Mind)
- Released: September 23, 2002
- Singles: "Djedai", "Shkolnichki"
Let's rock!
- Released: March 18, 2004
- Singles: -
Tsarsky albom (Tsar's Album)
- Released: November 24, 2005
- Singles: "Tzar'"
7
- Released: 2006
- Singles: -
Kamni (Stones)
- Released: 2008
- Singles: -
Glavclub (single)
- Released: 2009
Novyye Kirpy Moo Fok (New Kirpy Moo Fok)
- Released: 2011
- Singles: -
Summertime
- Released: 2013
Potomu Chto My Banda (Because We Are Banda)
- Released: 2015
Starchskiy Marazm (Senile Dementia)
- Released: 2021
