= Alisa (Russian band) =

Russian hard rock band

Алиса Alisa
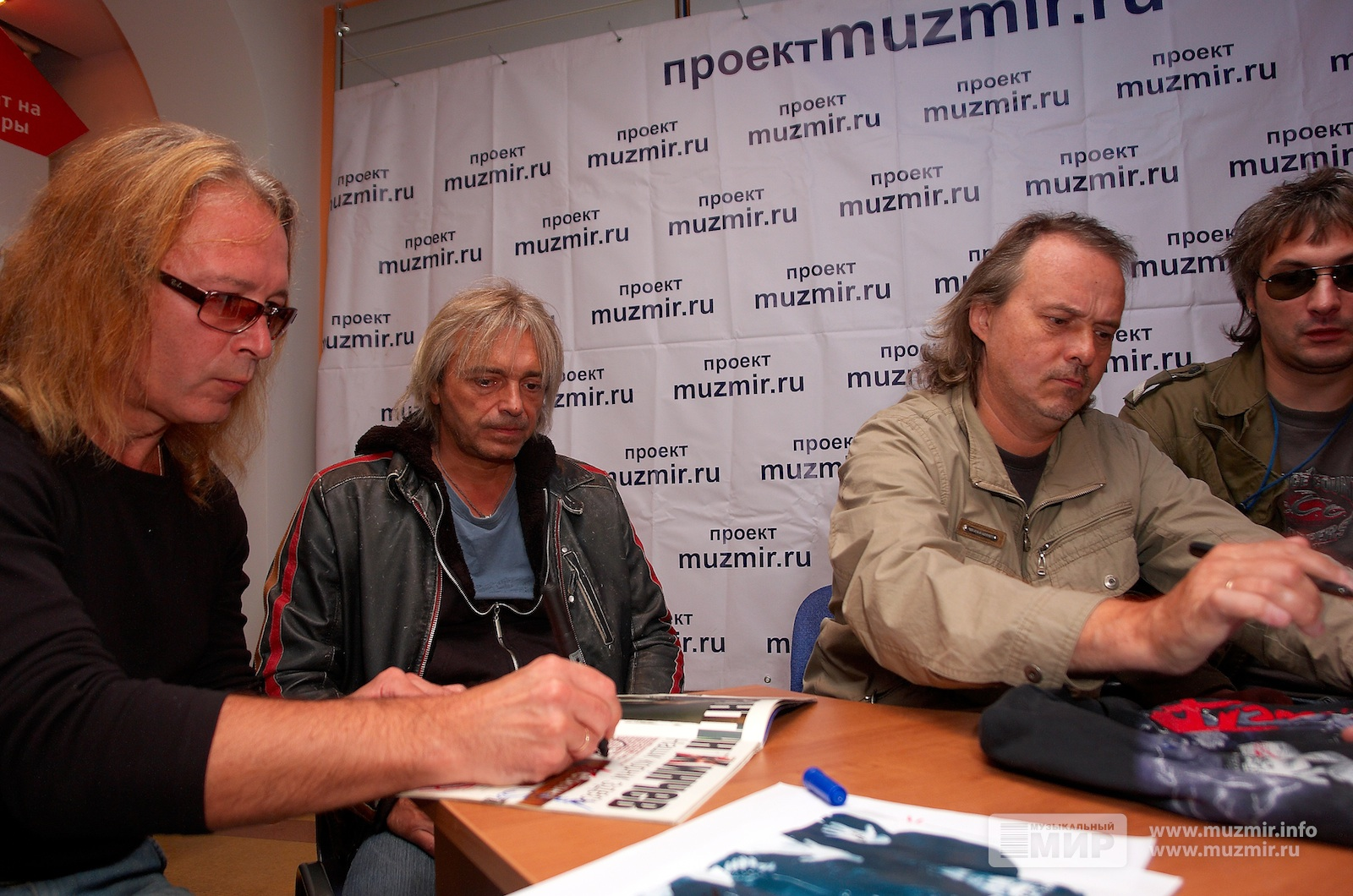
- L-R: Romanov, Kinchev, Samoylov, Levin

Background information
- Also known as: Alisa
- Origin: Leningrad, Soviet Union
- Genres: New wave, post-punk (early); Hard rock, Christian rock (recent)
- Years active: 1983-present
- Members: Konstantin Kinchev; Petr Samoylov; Eugeny Levin; Igor Romanov; Andrey Vdovichenko; Dmitri Parfyonov
- Past members: Svyatoslav Zadery; Mikhail Nefedov; Andrey Shatalin; Igor Chumychkin
- Website: Official website

Alisa (Russian: Алиса, lit. 'Alice') is a Russian hard rock band.

== History ==
Alisa was formed in November 1983 by bassist Svyatoslav Zadery. The band's name originated from Zadery's nickname. The band's lineup was finally completed in 1984, when new vocalist Kostya Kinchev (real name Konstantin Panfilov) and guitarist Petr Samoylov joined. Their debut album Energia was recorded between 1985 and 1986. Energia was released by the state publishing monopoly Melodiya in 1988.

The relations between Alisa's two leaders, Kinchev and Zadery, deteriorated, and Zadery left the band. This occurred just one hour before Alisa was to perform at a concert. Kino bassist Igor Tihomirov was asked to replace Zadery for one concert. Later, Zadery created his own band Nateh! (Russian: НАТЕ!, lit. 'Take that!'). Zadery died on 6 May 2011 due to complications from a stroke at the age of 50.

Alisa had a fan community called the Army of Alisa, known for their rough behaviour at concerts. It led to animosity between the band and Soviet officials. In 1987, the newspaper Smena accused Alisa's leader Kinchev of Nazi propaganda and worshiping Hitler. Kinchev filed a suit for calumny and moral damage compensation.

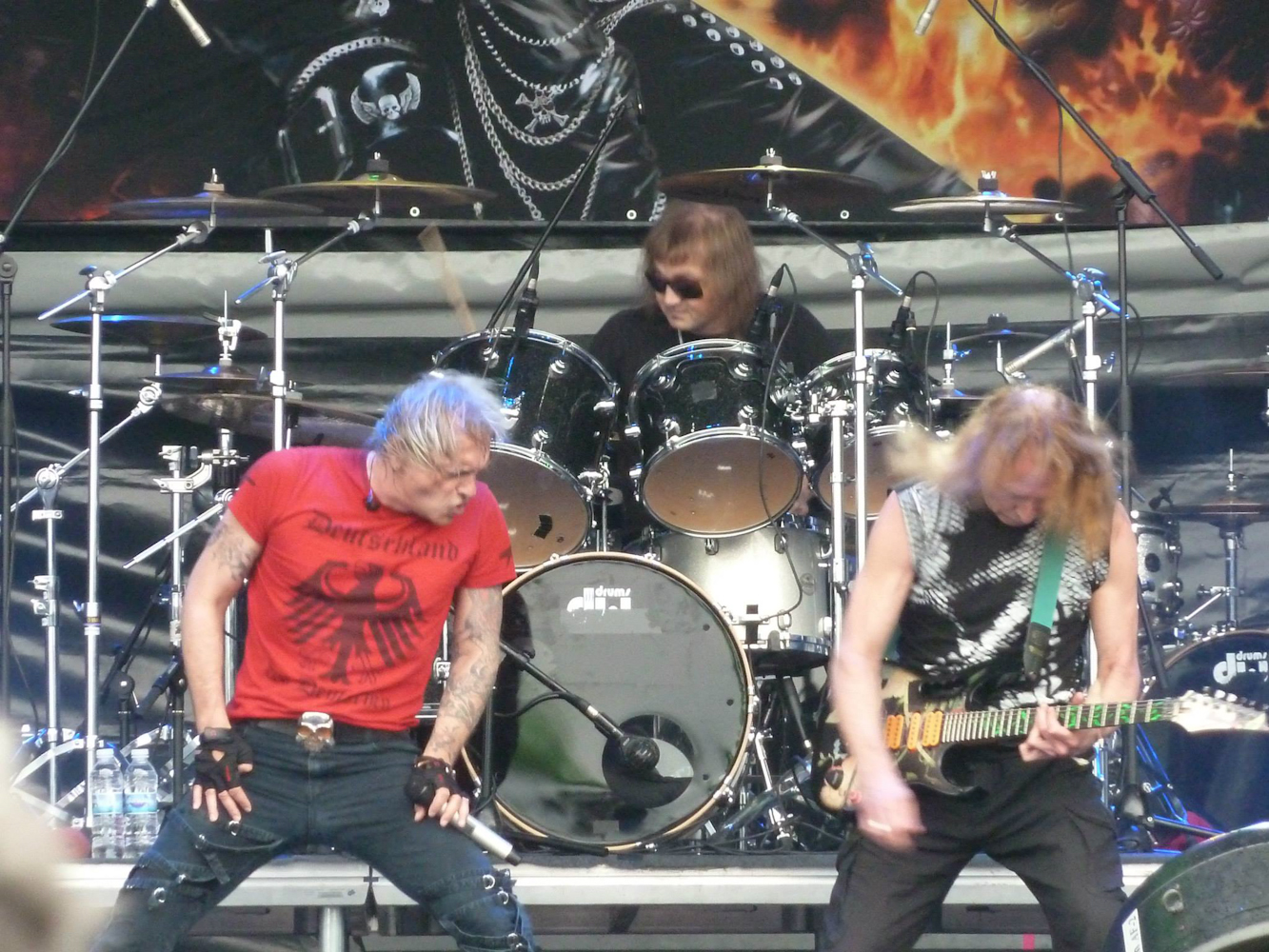
Alisa performing at Kavarna Rock Fest 2013

In 1988, guitarist Igor "Chuma" Chumychkin joined the band. This change was followed by the heavier sound of next two albums, Shabash and For those Who Fell From the Moon. Alisa toured through Europe and Israel together with fellow Russian heavy metal band Aria. The album Black Mark, released in 1994, was dedicated to the memory of Chuma, who committed suicide by jumping from a window.

In the new millennium, with albums such as Seychas Pozdnee Chem Ty Dumaesh (It is Later Than You Think, 2003) and Izgoy (Exile, 2005), Alisa's sound became heavier.

Alisa ranked among the top ten most popular Russian rock bands according to a Romir survey from 2005, and ranked first in the list of the most influential Russian rock groups according to a Komsomolskaya Pravda readers' poll from 2004.

== Lyrical themes ==
Kinchev was baptized in 1992 after a series of concerts in Jerusalem. Although early Alisa lyrics were typical for Russian rock - social protest and rock 'n' roll hype - since the late 1990s their main theme has been ideas of Christianity, as well as Russian patriotism and nationalism.

Kinchev's fairly conservative religious-patriotic shift was viewed unfavourably by some old fans that liked Alisa for their original "rock" message.

== Band members ==
=== Current line up ===
- Konstantin Kinchev – vocals, additional guitar (1985–present)
- Petr Samoylov – bass, backing vocals (1986–present), vocals (1983), guitar, backing vocals (1985–1986)
- Dmitri Parfyonov – keyboards, programming, backing vocals, additional guitar (2000–present)
- Andrey Vdovichenko (ru)– drums (2003–present)
- Pavel Zelitskiy (ru)– guitar (2018–present)
- Alexander Pyankov – guitar (2019–present)

=== Former members ===
- Boris Borisov – vocals, saxophone (1983)
- Lyudmila "Teri" Kolot – vocals (1986)
- Svetoslav "Alisa" Zadery – bass, vocals (1983–1986)
- Pavel "Pol Khan" Kondratenko – keyboards (1983–1988)
- Alexander Zhuravlev – saxophone (1987–1988)
- Igor "Chuma" Chumychkin – guitar (1988–1993)
- Andrey Korolev – keyboards (1989–1993)
- Alexander Ponomarev – guitar (1996–1998)
- Andrey Shatalin – guitar (1983–1985, 1986–1988, 1989–2003)
- Mikhail Nefedov – drums (1983–2003)
- Igor Romanov – guitar (2003–2018)
- Evgeniy Lyovin – guitar (1998–2019)

== Discography ==
=== Studio albums ===
Original title	Transliterated Title	Translation	Year of release
Энергия	Energiya	Energy	1985
Блок Ада	Blok Ada	Block of Hell / Blockade	1987
Шестой Лесничий	Shestoy Lesnichy	Sixth Ranger	1989
Шабаш	Shabash	Sabbath	1991
Для Тех, Кто Свалился с Луны	Dlya Tekh, Kto Svalilsya s Luny	For Those Who Fell from the Moon	1993
Чёрная Метка	Chyornaya Metka	Black Mark	1994
Статья 206 часть 2	Statya 206 chast 2	Article 206 part 2	1994
Jazz	Jazz	Jazz	1996
Кривозеркалье	Krivozerkalye	Through the Crooked Glass	1997*
Дурень	Duren'	Stupid	1998
Солнцеворот	Solntsevorot	Solstice	2000
Танцевать	Tantsevat'	To Dance	2001
Сейчас Позднее, Чем Ты Думаешь	Seychas Pozdnee, Chem Ty Dumayesh	It Is Later Than You Think	2003
Изгой	Izgoy	Exile	2005
Стать Севера	Stat Severa	Grace of the North	2007
Пульс Хранителя Дверей Лабиринта	Puls Khranitelya Dverey Labirinta	The Pulse of Labyrinth's Doors Keeper	2008
Ъ	Ъ (Tverdii Znak)	Ъ ( The Hard Sign - Russian Letter)	2010
20.12 (Двадцать Двенадцать)	20.12 (Dvadtsat Dvenadtsat)	20.12 (Twenty Twelve)	2011
Саботаж	Sabotazh	Sabotage	2012
Цирк	Tsirk	Circus	2014
Эксцесс	Ekstsess	Excess	2016
Посолонь	Posolon	Sunwise	2019
Дудка	Dudka	Pipe	2022

- Recorded with Svyatoslav Zadery on vocals, before Kinchev joined

=== Live albums ===
Original title	Translation	Year and venue	Year of release
Шабаш	Sabbath	1990, Moscow, Luzhniki Stadium	1991
На Шаболовке	At Shabolovka	1995, Moscow, Shabolovka	1995
Акустика часть 1	Acoustics vol.1	1988, Perm	1995
Акустика часть 2	Acoustics vol.2	1985, Leningrad	1997
Пляс Сибири на берегах Невы	Dance of Siberia on Neva Shores	1997, St-Petersburg, Jubileiny	1998
Акустика часть 3	Acoustics vol.3	1988, Pskov	2000
Акустика часть 4	Acoustics vol.4	1986, Novosibirsk	2002
Мы Вместе XX лет	We Are Together XX years	2003, St-Petersburg, Jubileiny	2005
Звезда по имени рок	Star Called Rock	2005, Moscow, Luzhniki Stadium	2007

=== Compilation albums ===
Original title	Translation	Year of release
Red Wave: 4 Underground Bands from the USSR		1986
Легенды Русского Рока	Legends of Russian Rock	1997
Энциклопедия Русского Рока	Encyclopedia of Russian Rock	2000
13		2003
