= Alexander Vasilyev (musician) =

Russian singer (born 1969)

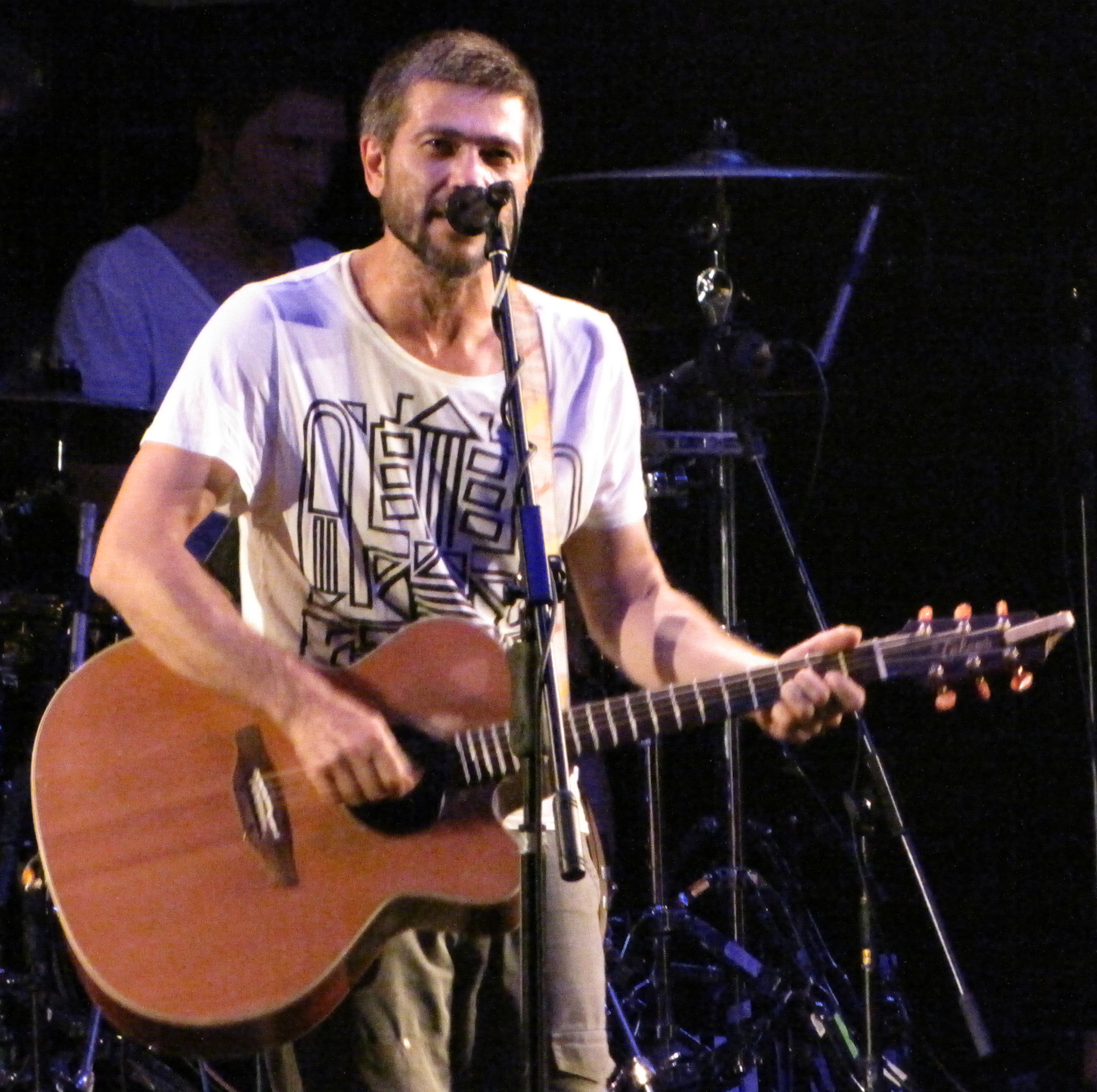
Alexander Vasilyev with Splean

Alexander Georgievich Vasilyev (Russian: Александр Гeopгиeвич Васильев; born July 15, 1969) is a singer, songwriter, and frontman of the Russian rock group "Splean". Vasilyev also released one solo album, and sometimes assisted other groups and artists.

== Life and career ==
Vasilyev was born in Leningrad. His father was an engineer and his mother taught Russian literature. He spent a few years of his childhood in Sierra Leone and Lithuania, where his father was sent on work assignments, before returning to Leningrad in 1980. Two years later, Vasilyev's parents transferred him to a mathematics-oriented school, where his previously outstanding academic performance started to slip and he learned to play guitar.

In the late '80s, while attending the Leningrad Avionics Institute, he met Alexander "Morris" Morozov, who would become Splean's first bass player. The two started recording at Morozov's rudimentary home studio as a band called Mitra. After serving in the Soviet army from 1988 to 1990, where he composed some songs that ended up on the first Splean record, "Dusty Tale," Vasilyev entered the Leningrad State Institute of Theater Arts, Cinema and Music (now the St. Petersburg Theater Arts Academy) to study theater business management. He worked at theaters as a stagehand to make ends meet.

Looking back at those years, Vasilyev said he was struggling to find himself and to figure out what he really wanted to do in life.

"It was the ordinary flailing around of a young man," he said. "I didn't set out to be a musician."

In 1993, Vasilyev met keyboardist Nikolai Rostovsky. Vasilyev, Morozov and Rostovsky formed Splean the following year. The band took its name from an archaic, literary meaning of the word "spleen," with one letter changed when rendered in Latin letters.

"In due course, the Beatles changed one letter in the word 'beetle.' As you know, it turned out well," Vasilyev said. "The word 'spleen' is flat. 'Splean' seems to me to be multi-dimensional."

Over the years, Splean have experimented with changing musical genres and adjusting their playing styles from album to album. They have also undergone a few slight lineup changes. Their newer albums sound almost nothing like the first ones, an evolution that Vasilyev described as "searching, searching, searching."

He did not speak directly about the full-scale invasion, but by his actions he made it clear that he was against the war in Ukraine.
