= Konstantin Kinchev =

Russian musician (born 1958)

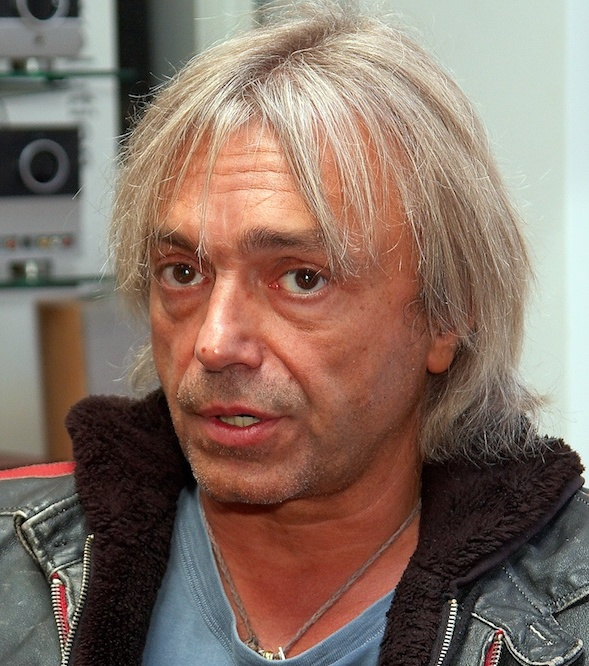

Background information
- Born: Konstantin Evgenievich Panfilov; December 25, 1958 (age 67); Moscow, Soviet Union
- Genres: Rock, hard rock, Rock'n'Roll
- Occupations: Singer, guitarist, songwriter
- Instruments: Guitar, singer
- Years active: 1974–present

Konstantin Evgenievich Kinchev (Panfilov) (Russian: Константи́н Евге́ньевич Ки́нчев (Панфи́лов); born December 25, 1958) is a Russian rock singer, musician, frontman and the main songwriter for the Russian rock/hard rock band Alisa.

== Biography ==
Born Konstantin Evgenievich Panfilov in Moscow, Soviet Union, he took his grandfather's surname for his stage name Kostya Kinchev. When Kinchev was a 15-year-old, he heard heavy metal band Black Sabbath for the first time. After that he decided to collect musical albums of hard rock bands of that time. In the mid 1970s, before joining Alisa he played in some local Moscow-based bands. In 1984 Kinchev made the decision to leave Moscow and move to Leningrad, where he was offered to become Alisa's vocalist.

The band's lineup was finally completed in December 1984, when new vocalist Kostya Kinchev and guitarist Petr Samoylov joined. Their debut album Energia was released by state publishing monopoly Melodiya and sold more than a million copies.

In 1987, the newspaper Smena accused Alisa's leader Kinchev of Nazi propaganda and worshipping Hitler. Kinchev filed a suit for calumny and moral loss compensation. After the year-long court process the magazine published a refutation. Alisa's next album was titled Article 206 part 2, a chapter ("Hooliganism") of the Soviet Union Procedural Code, alluding to this process.

Kinchev was baptised in 1992 after a series of concerts in Jerusalem, and since then Christianity has been the main influence on his alignment and his lyrics. Since the late 1990s his lyrics mainly dealt with Christianity, Russian patriotism, and Slavic unity. Kinchev has good relations with the priests of the Russian Orthodox Church. Kinchev's fairly conservative religious-patriotic shift was viewed unfavourably by some old fans that liked Alisa for their original "rock" message. Still others are put off by his antisemitism – among other things, he has referred to the Protocols of the Elders of Zion as a credible source.

=== Relations with authorities ===
During the Soviet period, Konstantin Kinchev’s relations with the authorities were strained.

On 21 April 1993, 4 days before the referendum on confidence in the President of Russia, Kinchev and Alisa performed on Vasilyevsky Spusk at a rally-concert in support of Boris Yeltsin. In 1996, Kinchev took part in a tour in support of Yeltsin to prevent the communists from returning to power in Russia. In an interview in 2009, Kinchev said that “now, thank God, there is no ideology that could subjugate the people through fear.”

In 2005, Kinchev said that he would support the idea of a third term for Vladimir Putin, as he sees more positives than negatives in his rule: "Putin took the country when it stood over an abyss and was about to split into small principalities. Over the years of his reign, he managed to unite and strengthen this country and the vertical of power."

Kinchev also proposed to start a new dynasty by marrying the president's daughter to English princes. On 4 June 2007, Alisa took part in a concert on Red Square dedicated to Russia Day. Before the 2008 presidential election, Kinchev said that he would vote for "the Kupchin guy who loves Black Sabbath."

In 2011, answering questions from the Kommersant website, Kinchev said that "Putin, at a certain stage of his reign, was useful to the country, but his time, in my opinion, is over." After the State Duma elections in 2011, Kinchev spoke out sharply against the falsification of their results.

During a performance of the song "Totalitarian Rap" at a concert on 9 December, 2011 in Saratov, Kinchev interrupted the performance of the song and began a dialogue with the audience. Having said that in the last few days he had already interviewed probably a hundred people, but had never heard a positive answer, he then asked the question to the audience: "Is there anyone who voted for the "party of power"?" (Note: According to journalists from Fontanka.ru, "among the spectators, the number of United Russia supporters was minimal") Kinchev asked: "Do we want to be governed by swindlers? Do we want these elections not to be rigged, but to be redone and become fair?" and added: "Today only the street can answer these questions. This is Kirov Avenue. Unfortunately, only the street. To avoid turning us into a deaf-mute society, we need to make decisions. The time has apparently come."

In February 2012, Kinchev said that he would not go to the presidential elections, stating, "personally, I have no one to vote for."

During the events of 2013-2014 in Ukraine, Kinchev supported the Russian government and the annexation of Crimea, and canceled concerts in Ukraine.

During the COVID-19 pandemic, Kinchev was opposed to restrictions and vaccination.
