= Agatha Christie (band) =

Russian punk/synth rock band

- Also known as: VIA RTF UPI (1984)
- Origin: Sverdlovsk, Russia
- Genres: gothic rock; post punk; psychedelic rock; alternative rock; art rock; new wave; glam rock; hard rock; pop-rock; russian rock
- Years active: 1985–2010, 2015 (reunion)
- Labels: Sintez Records; Extraphone; Nikitin Records; Style Records; Soyuz Studio
- Past members: Gleb Samoylov; Vadim Samoylov; Konstantin Bekrev; Roman Baranyuk; Alexander Kozlov; Andrei Kotov; Peter Mai; Lev Shultyev; Albert Popatkin; Dimitri Khakimov
- Website: https://samoylov-agata.ru/ https://agata.ru/ https://agata.rip/

Agatha Christie (Russian: Агата Кристи, romanized: Agata Kristi) was a Soviet and Russian rock band. Formed in 1984 by Vadim Samoylov, Alexander Kozlov, and Peter Mai in Sverdlovsk. under the name VIA RTF UPI (Russian: ВИА РТФ УПИ) the band changed their name to Agatha Christie, after the detective fiction author, in 1988 and went on to become one of the most notable Russian rock acts in the mid to late 1990s. During the recording sessions for their debut album "Second Front", Vadim's younger brother, Gleb, became a full-time member of the band. The band lineup changed continuously since then, with the Samoylov brothers being bandleaders, swapping vocal duties. The Samoylov brothers have been the principal songwriters of the band, together with keyboardist Alexander Kozlov.

== History ==
The band's music has spanned through a variety of genres across their albums, including gothic rock, post punk, alternative rock, psychedelic rock, glam rock, art rock and hard rock.

After the dissolution of the band in 2010, the former lead singer Gleb Samoylov, together with keyboardist Konstantin Bekrev and drummer Dmitry Khakimov, formed the group The Matrixx.

As part of growing internet censorship in Russia, a new law passed in March 2026 forced the band to edit their songs on Spotify and Youtube to remove lyrics related to consumption of narcotics, such as "we'll smoke opium" ("будем опиум курить") in their hit song “Opium for Nobody."

== Members ==
=== "The Golden Line-up" ===
- Vadim Samoilov — vocals, guitars, keyboards, arrangements, songwriter (1987-2010, 2015)
- Gleb Samoilov — vocals, bass guitar, guitar, keyboards, arrangements, songwriter (1988-2010, 2015)
- Alexander Kozlov — keyboards, synthesizer bass, arrangements, songwriter (1987-2001)
- Andrey Kotov — drums (1990-2008)

=== Other members ===
- Lev Shutylev — keyboards (1989-1990)
- Albert Potapkin — drums (1989-1990)
- Peter May — drums (1988-1989)
- Dmitry "Snake" Khakimov — drums (2008-2010)
- Konstantin Bekrev — keyboards, bass guitar, backing vocals (2008-2010, 2015)
- Roman Baranyuk — drums (2010, 2015)
- Arkady Baranyuk — keyboards (2015)
- Alexander Radchenko — guitar, bass (2015)

== Discography ==
LP
Data release	Title	Translation
1988	Второй фронт	The Second Front
1989	Коварство и любовь	Intrigue and Love (Note: A hint to Schiller's Intrigue and Love)
1991	Декаданс	Decadence
1993	Позорная звезда	Shameful Star
1995	Опиум	Opium
1997	Ураган	The Hurricane
1998	Чудеса	Wonders
2000	Майн Кайф?	Mein Bliss? (Note: A pun with Mein Kampf)
2004	Триллер. Часть 1	Thriller. Part 1
2010	Эпилог	Epilogue

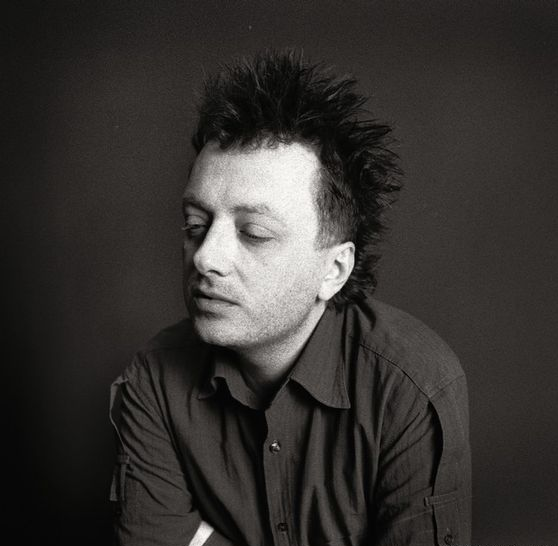
Gleb Samoylov in 2008

== Honors and awards ==
- 1991: Grand Prix at the Festival of young European bands Open du Rock (Burgundy, France)
- 1996, 1997, 2001: Ovation
- 1997: Golden Gramophone Award
- 1998: World Music Awards in the nomination Successfully selling foreign artist (Monte Carlo)
- 2004: Komsomolskaya Pravda, according to a survey of readers, Agatha Christie was the fourth most influential group in the history of Russian rock.

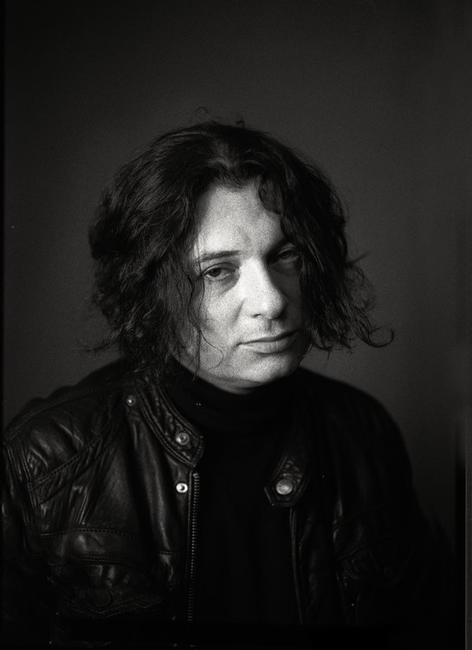
Vadim Samoylov in 2008
