= Roksi (periodical) =

Soviet music journal

Roksi (Russian: Рокси)
- Categories: Rock music
- First issue: October 1977
- Final issue Number: 1990; 15
- Country: Soviet Union
- Language: Russian

Roksi (Russian: Рокси, sometimes anglicized as Roxy) was a Soviet rock samizdat journal founded in 1977. It published 15 issues between 1977 and 1990. Roksi is generally considered to be the first rock music periodical in the Soviet Union.^{[Note 1]}

== History ==
[There] was no way in 1976 for a Soviet rock fan to read a review of a Time Machine concert or an interview with Volodya Kozlov, the leader of the Union of Rock Music Fans. A year later, however, such a chance made itself available to some of the fans: they had to ask friends for a copy of the type-written magazine Roxy.

— Aleksandr Startsev (editor of Roksi), Soviet rock : 25 years in the underground + 5 years of freedom

Roksi was established by Boris Grebenshchikov of Akvarium and Beatles-fanatic Kolya Vasin as a samizdat rock fanzine. Each copy was typewritten, with photographs glued to the pages. In order to comply with Soviet publishing laws at the time, no more than six copies were made of each issue.

The editorial committee for the first three issues consisted of Grebenshchikov, Vasin, Mike Naumenko of Zoopark, photographer Natasha Vasil'eva, and Yuri Il'chenko of Mify and Mashina Vremeni, with Grebenshchikov as editor-in-chief. The first three issues came out in October 1977, January 1978, and autumn 1978.

Aleksandr Startsev served as Roksi's chief editor from 1984 to 1990.

Starting in January 1985, Roksi became officially associated with the Leningrad Rock Club and increased its circulation to 50 copies per issue.

== Content ==
Roksi featured coverage of both Anglo-American and Soviet rock music. Features included editorials, rumor columns, the 'Lengortop' hit parade, interviews with musicians, and translated articles from Western sources, such as Rolling Stone. As the Soviet rock scene grew, local rock news and reviews made up more of the journal's content. Musicians and cultural figures interviewed included Yuri Il'chenko of Mify and Mashina Vremeni, Mike Naumenko, Andrey "Svin" Panov of Avtomaticheskie udovletvoriteli, ex-Kino guitarist Aleksei Rybin, ex-Strannye Igry member Aleksandr Davydov, Boris Grebenshchikov, Yuri Morozov, Alexander Titov, Mikhail ‘Fan’ Vasil’ev of Akvarium and Zoopark, Konstantin Kinchev, Vladimir Rekshan of Sankt-Peterburg, Viktor Tsoi, Mikhail Borzykin of Televizor, Leonid Fedorov and Sergei Rogoshkin of Auktyon, sound engineer Andrei Tropillo, Aleksandr Bashlachev, Aleksandr Lipnitsky of Zvuki Mu, and Andrey Makarevich.

== Notes ==
1. Mark Yoffe notes that earlier Soviet rock zines existed, but Roksi was "the first widely known and relatively widely circulating Soviet zine".
