= Rock music in Russia =

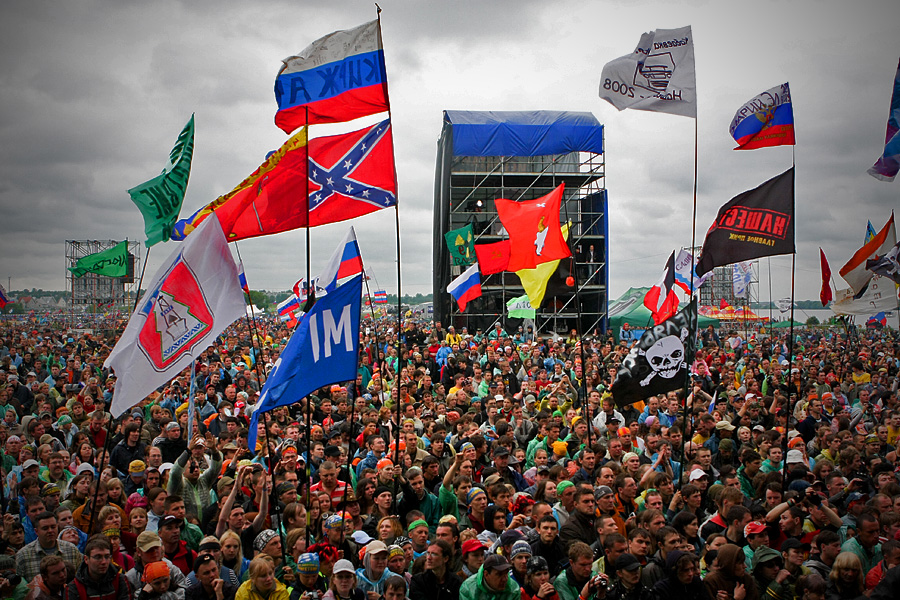
Nashestvie, one of the largest Russian rock festivals that attracts up to 200,000 fans annually

Russian rock music originated in the Soviet Union in the 1960s based on the influence of Western rock music and bard songs, and was developed by both amateur bands and official VIA.

The "golden age" of Russian rock was during the 1980s (especially the era of perestroika), when the Soviet underground rock bands became able to release their records officially. During this period, "rock clubs" were created, bands like "Kino", "Alisa", "DDT", "Bravo", "Nautilus Pompilius", "Aria", "Chaif", and "Grazhdanskaya Oborona" appeared and gained popularity, and already known groups, such as "Mashina Vremeni" and "Aquarium", began to publish albums officially.

Russian rock's characteristic feature was the emphasis on the lyrics. Due to its lyrical emphasis, it became a symbol of the youth of the Perestroika era. Russian rock of the 20th century is often considered a united cultural movement that has some common musical, aesthetic and ideological features. In the 21st century, almost all genres of rock music exist in Russia, which is why "Russian rock" has become a more vague concept. The majority of the Russian bands perform in the Russian language.

According to various polls, the most popular Russian rock bands include Kino, Aquarium, Aria, Alisa, DDT and Agatha Christie.

== History ==
=== The early 1960s: Local bard music and first western influences ===
By the mid-1960s, beat groups had formed in Moscow and Leningrad, at first performing cover versions of foreign hits on home-made equipment. Among these groups were "Sokol", "Scythians", "Buffoons" and "Slavs" (Alexander Gradsky's groups), and "Forest Brothers". In 1965, the band Sokol released the first rock song in Russian, "Gde tot krai?" (Russian: "Где тот край?"). The beat quartet "Integral" performed jazz music and compositions in the style of The Shadows and The Swinging Blue Jeans, and also composed their own twists and rock 'n' rolls. With the spread of Beatlemania, almost every school had its own rock band. The movement was partly influenced by the ideology of the Western hippies.

At the same time, Russian rock was partly influenced by bard music, a style referred to as avtorskaya pesnya (Russian: авторская песня, lit. 'author's song'), mostly played on unaccompanied acoustic guitar. It was characterized by a strong emphasis on lyrics that sometimes carried a subversive meaning, as well as a lively and informal approach to the theme - romance, everyday life, military songs, patriotic songs, satire, irony etc. The most famous performers of the bard song were Alexander Galich, Vladimir Vysotsky, Bulat Okudzhava.

Meanwhile, Western music was either being smuggled across the border or released by Melodiya as part of what was essentially state-run media piracy, with The Beatles taking a firm place in Soviet popular culture, and artists such as The Rolling Stones and Deep Purple completing a somewhat distorted picture of Western music.

=== The late 1960s and 1970s: Formation of the movement ===
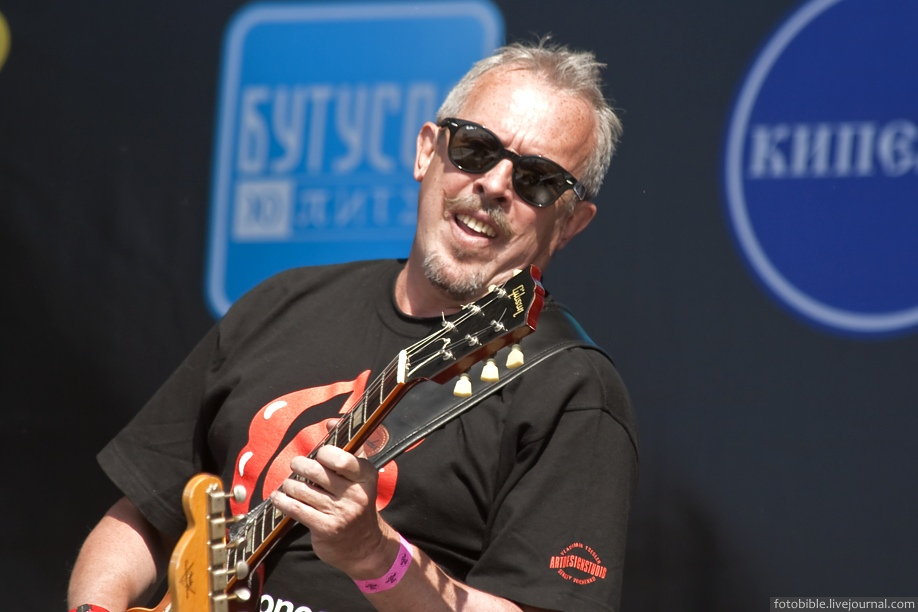
The "forefathers" of 70's Russian rock: Andrey Makarevich founded "Mashina Vremeni" in 1969...

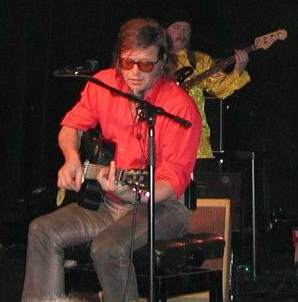
...and Boris Grebenshchikov founded "Aquarium" in 1972

In the late 1960s, the most advanced Russian rockers began experimenting with folk sound.

The beat music movement developed in the provinces. The first Russian rock and roll magazine "Beat-Echo" was released in 1965 (as samizdat). On December 18, 1966, the first rock festival in the USSR was held in Kamensk-Uralsky, Sverdlovsk region. In May 1969, the festival later known as "Woodstock-na-Donu" was held in Rostov-na-Donu.

However, the musicians of independent bands faced two problems that limited their activities. The first was the unavailability of recording studios (then sole record label, Melodiya, would later forge a partnership with international label EMI in the 70s). The second problem was that after completing higher education, musicians had to make a choice: to leave to work in their specialty or join a professional band - VIA (Russian: Вокально-инструментальный ансамбль, romanized: Vokal'no-Instrumental'nyy ansambl', lit. 'Vocal-Instrumental Ensemble').

Guitar-driven bands evolved during this time, including Leningrad-based Pojuschie Gitary and Belarusian Pesnyary. These bands started the VIA movement, and were followed by others, such as Tsvety, Ariel, Golubye Gitary, and Sinyaya Ptitsa. Some Soviet composers — David Tukhmanov, Yury Antonov — tried to combine the traditions of Soviet estrada with modern musical ideas, including those introduced by Western rock music. At the same time, Mashina Vremeni in Moscow and Aquarium in Leningrad started as nominally amateur bands and soon became popular, performing underground concerts.

In the early 1970s, Yuri Morozov invented a kind of Russian psychedelic rock, using elements of progressive rock and ethnic Russian music. His sound influenced DDT, Aquarium, Chizh & Co, and many others, while he worked with them as a sound engineer. Morozov, as well as "Scythians", "Sadko" and "Tin Soldiers", released the earliest Russian rock recordings through samizdat.

Another notable artist who started his activity at the same time is Alexander Gradsky, who fused bard music with Western rock. As successful composer and singer, he was able to release some of his recordings through Melodiya since 1973.

In 1970 and 1971, the first All-Soviet rock festival "Silver Strings" was held. In 1971 and 1972, the "Pop Federation" organization was engaged in underground rock concerts. Moscow Power Engineering Institute was the most famous venue for rock bands of the 1970s in Moscow. In March 1976, Tallinn (ESSR) hosted the "Tallinn Youth Songs" Rock Festival, which brought together bands from different republics of the Soviet Union. During this period, concert recordings, rather than studio recordings, were mainly distributed, which were rewritten as self-published from one owner of the tape recorder to another. Since 1979, new underground recording studios have emerged (AnTrop, Sverdlovsk Studio etc.).

For Leningrad, the concept of acoustic kvartirnik (house concert) was spread; Moscow bands performed mainly in electricity. "Ruby Attack", "Argonauts", "Mify", "Successful Acquisition", "Mashina Vremeni", "Sankt-Peterburg", "Rossiyane", "Vysokosnoe leto", "Autograph", and "Voskreseniye" were among the main groups of the 1970s underground scene. Most of them were influenced by the styles of art rock, hard rock and progressive rock.

Some of the first officially published full-length rock albums were "Russian pictures" VIA "Ariel" (1977) and "Guslar" VIA "Pesnyary" (1979). Some Soviet composers of the turn of the 70s - 80s worked in the rock opera format; the most famous works are "Orpheus and Eurydice" (1975), "The Star and the Death of Joaquin Murieta" (1978), and "Juno and Avos" (1981).

=== The 1980s: Golden era ===
In the 1980s, an underground scene of rock artists emerged who based their style on a mix of Western rock music (particularly from the 1960s and 1970s, but also, increasingly, on the emerging New Wave, NWOBHM and Western punk rock) and the Russian bard traditions. Bands such as Voskreseniye, Alisa, Autograph, Kino, Mashina Vremeni, Nautilus Pompilius, Aquarium, Secret, Piknik, DDT, Krematorij, Grazhdanskaya Oborona, and Agatha Christie became influential in the development of the genre, with subsequent artists influenced by their style. At the same time, many bands of the 1980s were, in a sense, a group accompanying a songwriter. Often bands were formed around such an author of lyrics (and sometimes music), who was usually considered a "leader" and, just like the band, became widely known.

In 1980, Spring Rhythms: Tbilisi-80 took place in Tbilisi in the Georgian SSR. It was the first official rock festival in the Soviet Union. Many of the prize-winners at the festival were rock groups from the Russian SFSR, as well as Georgia and the Baltics. The "Fiztech—1982" festival actually launched the popularity of new wave.

In the late 1970s and early 1980s, a lot of amateur bands who signed labor agreements and contracts with various philharmonic societies of the USSR, such as "Mashina Vremeni", "Zemlyane", "Autograph", "Cruise", and "Dialog", among others, were able to break into professional scene.

Since the mid-80s Russian rock was also influenced by the Russian art group Mitki.

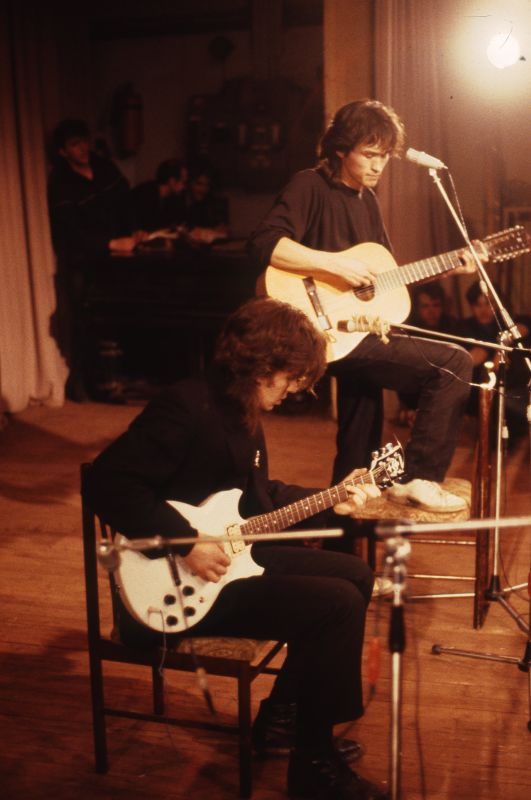
Post-punk band Kino was one of the most popular in the 1980s Soviet Union.

The lyrics of the Soviet rock bands often dealt with the darkest sides of 1980s Soviet life, such as domestic violence, alcoholism (an infamous song by Nautilus Pompilius contained the lines "Alain Delon drinks a double bourbon/Alain Delon doesn't drink eau de cologne" as a sarcastic contrast to the alcoholic father described in the song and an indictment of the escapist attitudes of state-run media) and crime, and often carried a hidden political message.

In consequence, the mainstream Soviet radio and television ignored Soviet rock bands, which often reached audiences only through word of mouth. The monopoly for music publishing in the USSR belonged to Melodiya, the Soviet record label owned and operated by the Council of Ministers through the Ministry of Culture. Melodiya had a strict policy against publishing rock music or underground musicians, while promoting VIAs, whose members (as well as the composers and writers who worked with them) were members of the Union of Composers. Some rock musicians (Yuri Shevchuk, Yegor Letov and many others) had problems with the KGB due to their public activities. During the early 1980s, Soviet authorities started to exert heavy pressure on amateur bands, banning underground concerts as a sort of illegal commercial activity and imprisoning some music promoters and sound engineers for earning money from underground concerts.

Many of the bands from the 1980s remain active and popular among Russian youth. The term Russian rock is often used to refer to the particular sound of these bands.

==== Various music scenes ====
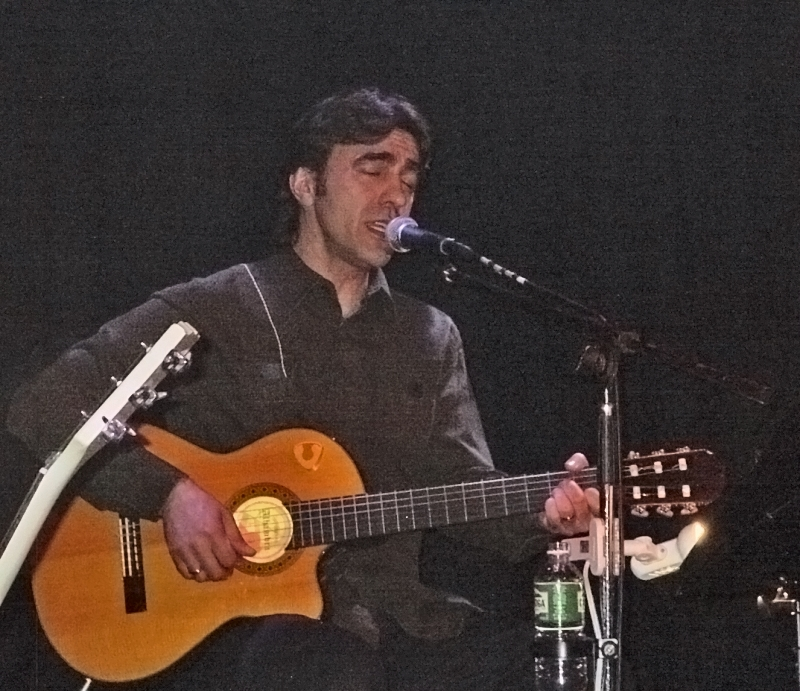
Vyacheslav Butusov, the front-man of the band Nautilus Pompilius, which helped to launch the Sverdlovsk new-wave scene.

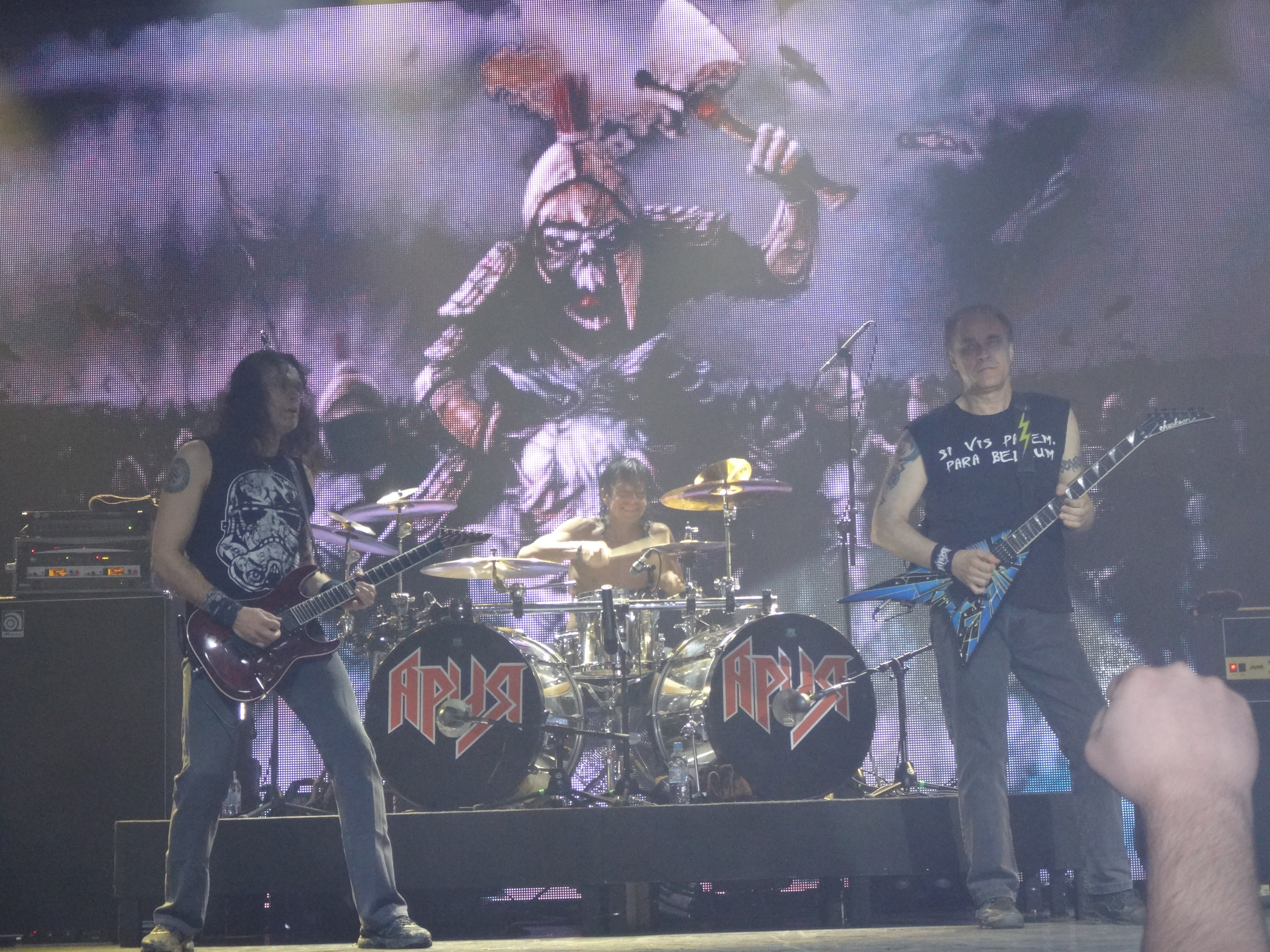
Aria is one of Russia's most popular heavy metal bands

In the early- to mid-1980s, rock clubs were founded in Moscow, Leningrad (now Saint Petersburg) and Sverdlovsk (now Yekaterinburg). These three cities had their own rock scenes and friendly collaborations between artists were commonplace.

The Leningrad Rock Club, founded in 1981 and supported by the CPSU, Komsomol, and the city and federal governments, was probably the biggest venue, featuring "classic Russian rock" by Aquarium, Kino, Zoopark, Piknik, Alisa, DDT, Televizor, N.E.P., etc. It also included the nascent Russian art-rock movement, typified by bands such as Auktyon. An important figure in the Leningrad Rock scene was Sergey Kuryokhin, a well-known piano/keyboard player of different music genres including rock and free-jazz, and leader of his ambitious multimedia project Pop Mekhanika, was one of the first Soviet underground musicians to release albums in Europe and the United States.

Bands from Sverdlovsk, such as Nautilus Pompilius, Chaif, and Agatha Christie, produced more melodic music, making heavy use of keyboards and synthesizers.

Moscow rock bands, such as Aria, Mashina Vremeni, Voskreseniye, Center, Krematorij and Zvuki Mu, were rather different from the others, and sometimes more discreet.

The Siberian rock scene began in the 1980s, with songwriters such as Yegor Letov (Grazhdanskaya Oborona, Omsk), Kalinov most, Alexander Bashlachev and Yanka Dyagileva. Their music varied from simple lo-fi punk to indie rock (sometimes acoustic), and the core of their songs were the lyrics. Many albums were first self-released and distributed among fans via trading, then officially re-released years later. Lyrics were often obscene, and showed that the writers had major problems with the Soviet administration and KGB. A notable act that was not a member of any of the three Rock-Clubs, but nonetheless highly popular, is rock and roll band Secret.

At that time, the Russian heavy-metal scene originated thanks to bands like Aria, Chorny Kofe and Master (formed by a few ex-members of Aria).

The glam-metal band Gorky Park achieved high popularity in the west, and was even aired on MTV.

Russian punk style is generally accepted to be idealized by Grazhdanskaya Oborona and by Yegor Letov's other projects. The music mixes equal parts Western punk and traditional Russian influences, with gritty production and extremely charged and political lyrics.

===== Punk music movement =====
The Soviet Union punk-rock culture started in the 1980s, mostly as a protest movement against the corruption of the regime and the sense there was "no future". It differed from British punk culture in that the Soviet Union did not have an explicit class society, and the society as such was communist; as a result, Soviet punk became a protest against the social climate of the time. Soviet punks usually wore boots and coats found in military shops. While in the UK punk arose partly as a protest against more-established rock-music genres like progressive rock or glam rock, in the Soviet Union all rock music remained in the underground, which made for a certain solidarity between punk-rock fans and other rock fans in Russia.

Aside from the traditional anarchist ideology, many Russian punks belong to the National Bolshevik movement (with its founder Eduard Limonov, being a punk himself in his youth) and Yegor Letov, the godfather of Russian punk, linking it to the movement.

Yegor Letov is considered the godfather of Russian punk with his band Grazhdanskaya Oborona, which started performing in the early 1980s. During Soviet times, the band frequently got in trouble with the authorities, and each of the members was arrested for their activities at some point.

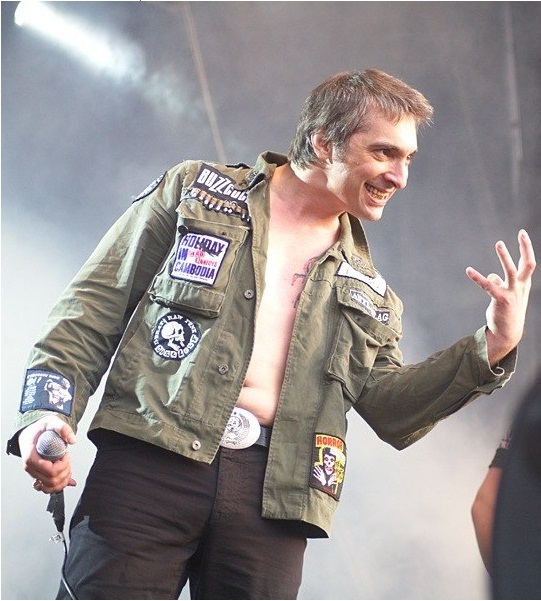
Mikhail Gorsheniov, the lead singer of horror punk band Korol i Shut.

In the late 1980s another band started operating in Russia, reaching a cult status: Sektor Gaza. They proclaimed themselves as "kolkhoz punk rockers", mixing elements from Russian village life with punk music. However, while some called the band "original" and "true folk punk", others criticized the band's style. Mikhail Gorsheniov from Korol i Shut said: "Sektor Gaza were never a part of the punk rock wave! They have no idea in music at all".

Another cult band formed a few years later was Korol i Shut, introducing horror punk, using costumes and lyrics in the form of tales and fables. Through sophisticated texts and themes not usually explored by punk, and through a sophisticated punk sound, Korol i Shut achieved the status of one of the most popular bands in Russia.

===== Tatars =====
Traditionally, Tatar rock music has been a Tatar language version of rock music in Russia. Therefore, the lyrics and vocals take priority over instrumental sounds. Some of the earliest Tatar rock bands were Soviet bands Saq-Soq and Bolgar, as well as Başkarma (by the Tatar diaspora in Finland), all bands active in the late 1980s. Today, the most popular Tatar rock bands are Alqanat (since 2005) from Aqtanış and Xat (since 2001) from Sarman. Some other popular bands are KGB, Yar band, İlsöyä Bädretdineva, İsmail, rhymes and 116.

Other pop-rock groups include Malaylar, Yarda and Ataqlı Radio Şäxeslär. Pop singer Alsou has sung, at times, in her native Tatar.

==== From underground to publicity ====
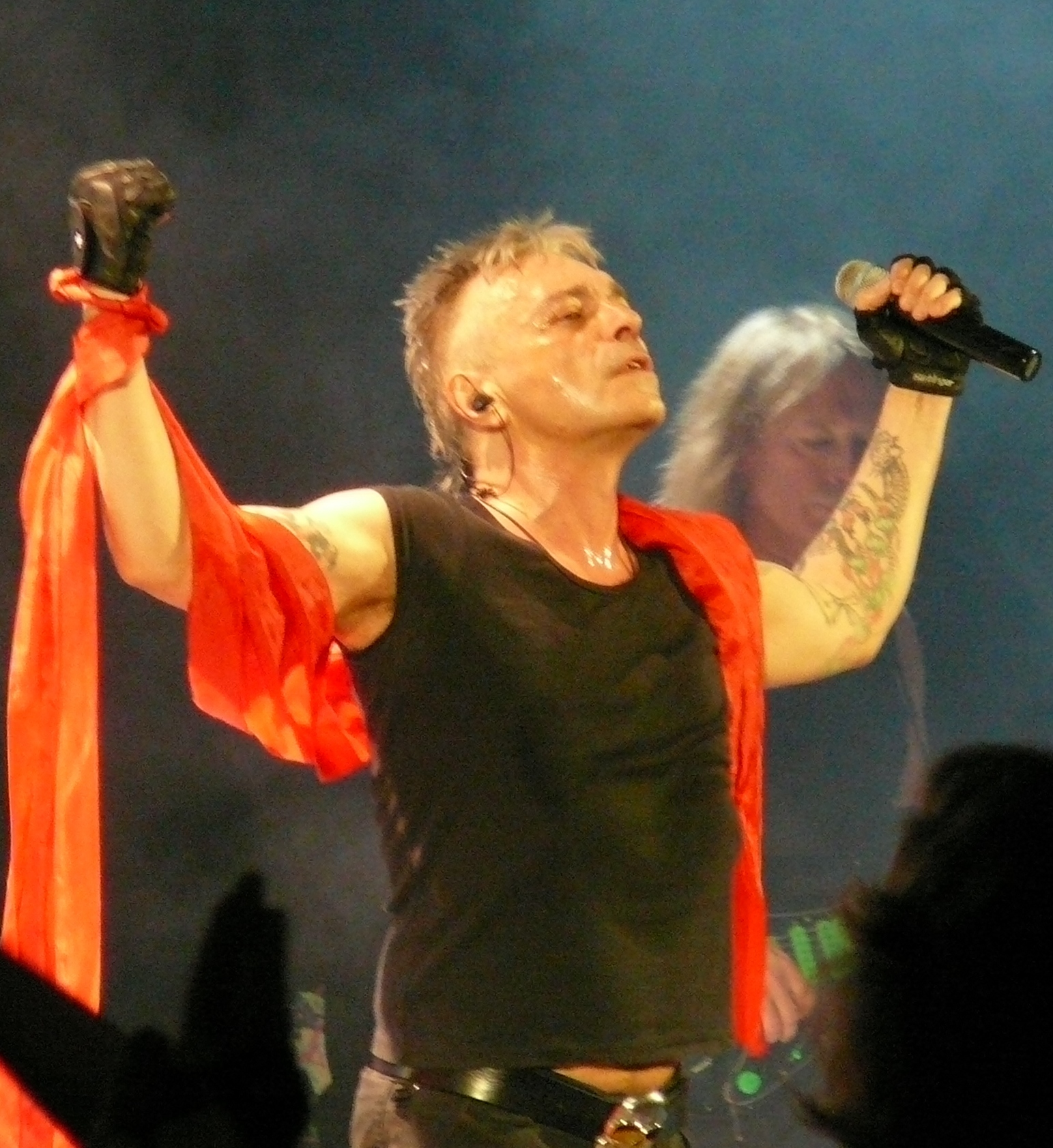
Alisa's vocalist Konstantin Kinchev is famous for expressive stage performances.

The late 1980s was a period of breakthrough for soviet rock music entering the public eye. Political and social changes in the country were very important for this process.

The censorship was still present, but not as rigid as it was in the 1970s or early 1980s. It took years for the first Soviet rock bands to enter radio and television programs, tour in major concert halls over the USSR, and to release their albums officially on Melodiya, in direct competition with the VIA groups.

The rock music situation changed during the perestroika era. Many Russian rock bands were able to tour and record in Europe and United States for the first time. As a result, in 1989-1991 the situation was completely different from that of 1985. Moscow Music Peace Festival was held in Moscow featuring western rock artists, Gorbachev accepted Scorpions in Kremlin, Brian Eno produced an album by Zvuki Mu, and Dave Stewart (of Eurythmics fame) produced Radio Silence by Boris Grebenshchikov for the release in the western world.

With Joanna Stingray's initiative, in 1986 the Red Wave compilation was released in the United States. It was a double split album with four bands from Leningrad: Aquarium, Kino, Alisa, and Strannye Igry, with one side of vinyl for each band. This compilation was the first official Russian rock release in the west. Stingray sent copies of the release to Ronald Reagan and Gorbachev, with a statement saying that musicians had already done what both presidents could not do diplomatically. Melodiya's reaction was an official release of a record by Aquarium in order to create the illusion that recordings of the band were also widely released in the USSR.

Television and film also contributed to the breakthrough of Russian rock to the public in the 1980s. New musical television shows, such as Muzykalny Ring (Музыкальный ринг) and Programma A (Программа "А"), invited rock artists for interviews and live shows. In the late 1980s, several films featuring Russian rock musicians as actors were released. These films include Igla and Assa featuring Viktor Tsoi and music by Aquarium and Taxi Blues featuring Pyotr Mamonov. The Canadian filmmaker Peter Vronsky travelled to Moscow and Leningrad in February 1988, and shot a series of music videos with Televizor, Aquarium, Nebo i Zemlya, Zvuki Mu and other bands. The music videos were tied together in the documentary film Russian Rock Underground, which aired on MuchMusic television in Canada and on Italian television.

Estimates of the popularity explosion of Russian rock in that period are ambiguous. In a series of articles devoted to the history of the Soviet Union, "Argumenty I Fakty" noted: "Young people plunged headlong into rock, which came out of the underground, which, as recognized by the best musicians of this direction, didn't have a creative agenda at that moment."

=== The 1990s: Post-Soviet era ===
The beginning of the 1990s are considered to be the end of the "classic" Russian rock era. The two events that mark its end are the death of Viktor Tsoi in 1990 and the dissolution of the Soviet Union in 1991. Nevertheless, the Russian rock sound continued to live, and the new Russian rock sound of the '90s was based on it. Many Soviet rock bands, such as DDT, Nautilus Pompilius, Mashina Vremeni, were still popular. In 1996 the recording company Moroz started releasing the highly popular series Legends of Russian Rock.

During this period, rock magazines began to be published officially. One of the most prominent Russian rock magazines, Rockcor, was established in 1991 and published eight issues annually. Rock City was another significant magazine founded at that time. The end of the decade saw the appearance of new periodicals, the most popular of which was Dark City, which positioned itself as the successor to Rock City. Another Russian magazine, InRock, was established in 2000 and published bimonthly. By the 2010s, their circulations were 64,500 for Dark City, 30,000 for Rockcor, and 10,000 for InRock. The regional press for Russian rock included the Saint-Petersburg-based magazine Fuzz. It operated from 1991 to 2009, with a circulation of 45,000 in its final years.

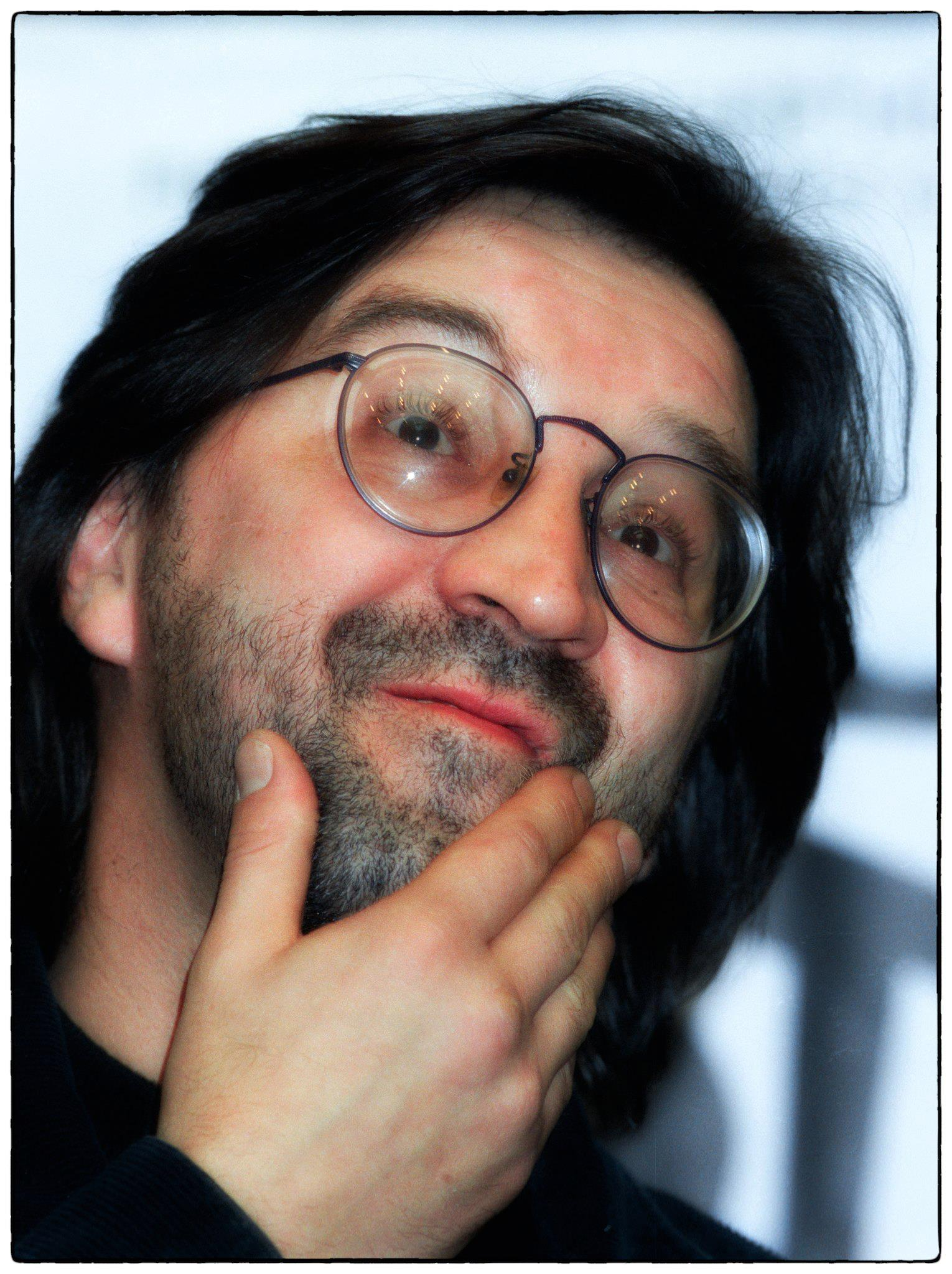
1990s were an important and eventful period in the life and work of DDT and personally for its leader, Yuri Shevchuk.

In the mid-late 1990s the radio station Nashe Radio was created to promote Russian rock artists, broadcasting in all major Russian cities. Nashe Radio notably influenced the public's auditory taste, and helped many artists gain popularity. The radio station founded Nashestvie, the largest open-air rock festival of Russian rock music, performed annually from 1999 to 2019, and was always headlined with famous rock acts.

Often aired by Nashe Radio, bands like Splean, Nochniye Snaiperi, Smisloviye Galutzinatzii, Chicherina, and Bi-2 created a refreshed Russian rock sound which adopted many elements from Alternative rock. Dolphin created a mixture between alternative rock, electronic music and rapcore.

An eminent representative of the heavy metal music genre was Aria, which had achieved great recognition and popularity among a wide audience in the 1990s.

In the late 1990s, numerous punk, pop-punk and grunge bands broke through. Sektor Gaza was first Russian band to use curse words and vulgar short stories in its lyrics. The horror punk band Korol i Shut managed to achieve a cult status and mainstream success using fairy-tale inspired lyrics. Other notable punk artists included Pilot, Lumen, Tarakany!, and Nogu Svelo!. Many of them developed an original sound and included involvement of unconventional instruments like violin.

Ska punk was brought to popularity mainly by the band Leningrad, notable for the extensive use of mat (Russian profanity) in its lyrics.

The Russian instrumental rock artist Victor Zinchuk reached international success with his solo career, and with that brought the Russian instrumental rock scene to a bigger audience.

Indie rock was represented by bands such as Masha i medvedi.

The western Pop rock sound was introduced by Ilya Lagoutenko's Mumiy Troll, who made their records in the UK under the guidance of UK producers. This less lyrically loaded and more energetic style, frequently referred to as rockapops, which was also used by other notable musicians such as Zemfira, and became prevalent among the younger public.

The Russian crime films Brother, with its soundtrack featuring the band Nautilus Pompilius, and its sequel Brother 2, which featured music from various Russian rock artists, brought many young fans to Russian rock.

=== The 2000s: Further development ===
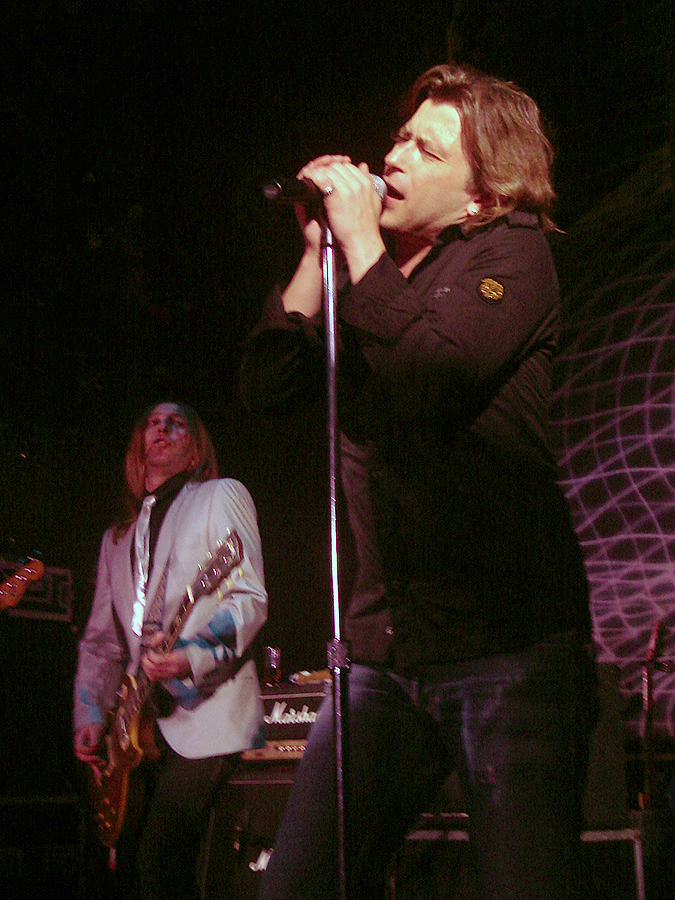
After being used in the Brother 2 soundtrack, Bi-2 established itself as one of the most popular Russian rock bands.

The 2000s in Russian rock were marked by both a continuance of the 1990s and something of a comeback of the classic 1980s sound. In the years following the renaissance of Russian cinema and rock, rock in Russia seemed to gain enough ground to differentiate widely through various genres. The 2005 Live 8 concert in Moscow featured mainly Russian rock artists.

Alternative metal, Nu metal and metalcore gained wider popularity at that time. In the mid-2000s, bands like Amatory, Tracktor Bowling, Grenouer, Slot, and 5 Diez were established, and were intensively promoted by the Russian television channel A-One. The channel awarded many of them with the Rock Alternative Music Prize.

The Russian heavy metal scene continued to develop, with power metal bands like Catharsis and Epidemia, founded in the 1990s, receiving more attention, and progressive metal band Orgia Pravednikov rising to prominence. In 2002, Valery Kipelov left Aria and formed the band Kipelov with other ex-members of Aria.

Folk rock music had a revival following Pelageya's and Melnitsa's rise from underground acts to bands that were played on the radio, and the attention pagan metal bands like Arkona received.

Though the Russian progressive rock scene had existed since the 1970s, it entered the public eye of Russian rock fans in the 2000s, with bands like Little Tragedies and The Gourishankar being its most obvious representatives. Since 2001, a prog-music festival named InProg was held almost yearly in Moscow. Its popularity constantly grew, and in 2005 it turned from a local festival into an international one. The Russian instrumental rock scene, with bands like EXIT project, Disen Gage, Dvar and Kostarev Group, also received more recognition at that time.

=== The 2010s: Decline ===
Despite the fact many bands from previous decades are still active, such as DDT and Splean, due to the lack of new bands gaining significant attention, there is a common view that Russian rock is in decline. Ilya Chert, from the band Pilot, said: "I can see the decline of Russian rock. We are going back to the times, when those who are really talented and wise are operating in basements and clubs with the capacity of 50 people, as they don't commercialize themselves and no one commercializes them". Artemy Troitsky, the famous Russian rock critic, wrote an article titled "Rock died a long time ago, but the funeral was impressive", where he brought up the lack of new faces in the Russian rock scene, and accused bands like Mashina Vremeni and Garik Sukachov for "selling out" and not protesting against the current government. In 2008 MTV Russia cancelled the nomination "Best Rock Project", with the resulting headlines being "MTV Recognized the Death of Russian Rock". From 2009 to 2013, Samara hosted a one-day international rock festival in Europe — Rock on the Volga.

==== Rock musicians divided by the Crimean Crisis ====
The annexation of Crimea by the Russian Federation in 2014 divided the Russian rock community into supporters and opposers of the move. Former Aria leader, and current leader of the band Kipelov, Valery Kipelov, expressed support of the "annexation", and stated that it should've been done in 1991. He performed at music festivals celebrating the event in Crimea.

Konstantin Kinchev and his band Alisa, considered to be among the pioneers of Russian rock, expressed support of the move, and cancelled all of his concerts in Ukraine. Kinchev had already expressed views supporting the return of Crimea to Russia in 2008.

Other prominent figures in Russian rock who expressed support of the move included Chaif, Chicherina, Alexander F. Sklyar, and Vadim Samoylov (ex-Agatha Christie member).

On the other hand, Andrey Makarevich was one of the organizers of the 2014 anti-war protests in Russia, and harshly criticized the annexation Another prominent figure to criticize the annexation was Yuri Shevchuk (DDT) Singer Zemfira expressed her opposition by waving a Ukrainian flag while performing on stage.

The musicians who didn't criticize the annexation, spoke against war in general, and called for peace between the peoples, were prominent figures such as Boris Grebenshchikov (Aquarium) and Vyacheslav Butusov (Nautilus Pompilius).

== Characteristics ==
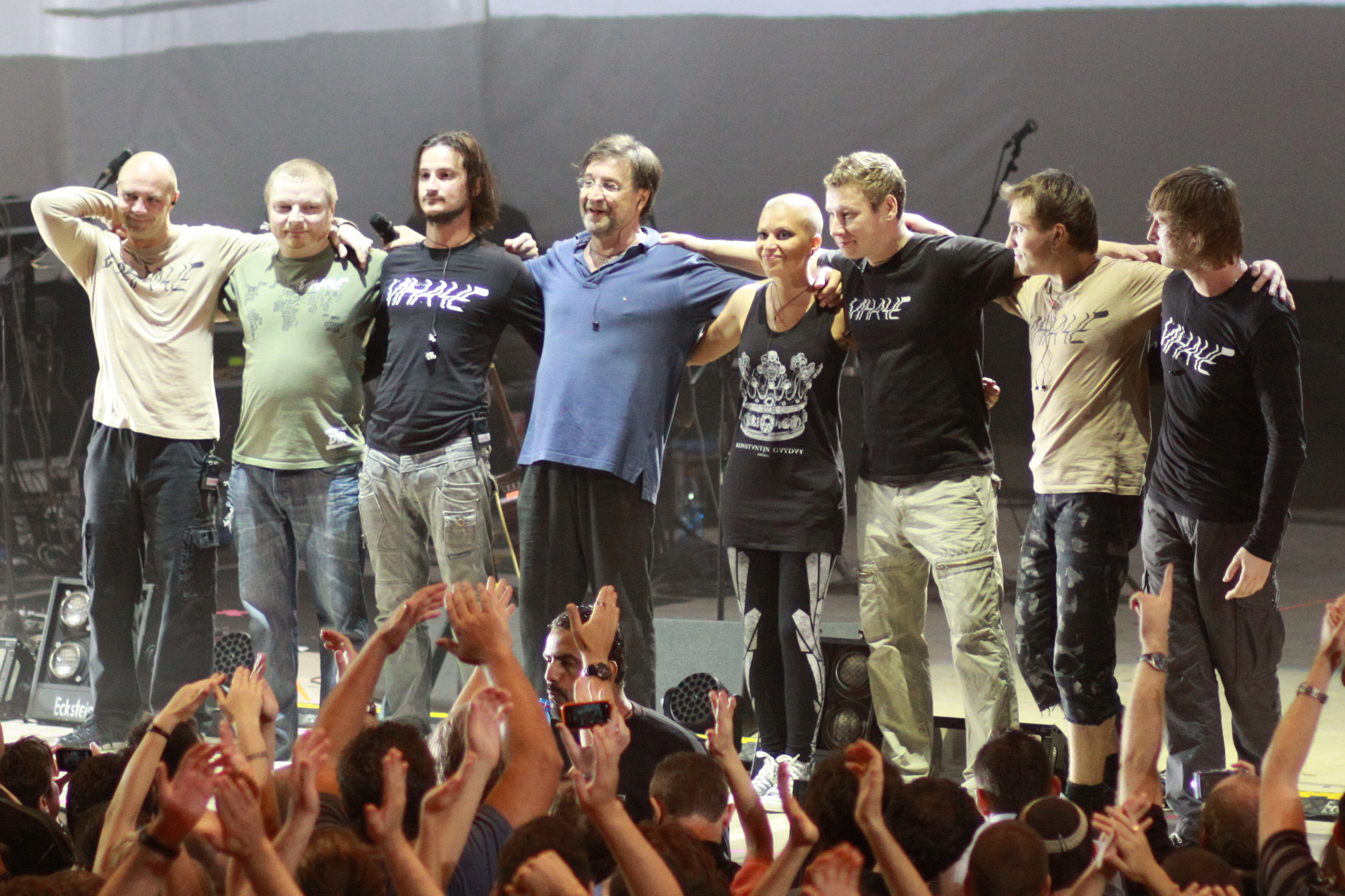
DDT is best known for Yuri Shevchuk's symbolist lyrics and feature a strong bard music influence

Fans of Russian rock would frequently refer to most of the music on MTV Russia dismissively as "popsa", a dichotomy that appeared in the '80s, when government-controlled radio and TV stations would air only politically harmless music by performers such as Philipp Kirkorov. The lines are still quite clearly drawn, with bands such as Nogu Svelo! - who recorded a song with pop-singer Nataliya Vetlitskaya - being an anomaly.

In contrast to Western rock, Russian rock is often said to have less drive; it is characterized by different rhythms, instruments and more involved lyrics. Unconventional instruments have often been used in addition to the standard electric guitars and drums associated with rock music (very often violin and wind instruments).

Another characteristic of Russian rock is being partly folk rock. Very often, Russian rock songs, especially those of the classic 80s bands, talk about national themes, and feature elements from Russian folk music. Aquarium, DDT and Yuri Morozov are examples of this.

Considering its poetic roots (Russian literature, bard music), lyrics play a far larger role in Russian rock than Western rock. Vocal melody is sometimes eschewed in favor of a more impassioned delivery (Viktor Tsoi, the lead singer of Kino, pioneered a characteristically strained, monotonous style of singing that has been imitated by many).

The metaphor of Russia facing both East and West is epitomized by the double-headed eagle on its coat-of-arms. The Eastern influence in the Russian rock is heard in soundtracks from movies like Day Watch, which has Tamerlane's legend of the Chalk of Destiny at its roots. Russian rock expressively used and integrated elements from both Western and Eastern culture (especially from countries of the USSR).

Yngvar Bordrewich Steinholt (University of Tromsø, Norway) has written a PhD thesis in English, printed by The Mass Media Music Scholars Press, titled "Rock in the Reservation" (2004), about the Leningrad Rock Club. It also touched upon the history of rock in Russia and its counter-cultural tendencies.

== Wordplay ==
In Russian, the original meaning of word "рок" is "fate" or "doom". The word is used almost exclusively in fiction, especially poetry (a more widely used synonym is "судьба"). These correlate with the poetic roots of Russian rock and its attention to "serious" topics.

The wordplay is used in the song "This is Fate" (Russian: Это рок) from Aria's debut album Mania Velichia.

== See also ==
- Rock and roll and the fall of communism
