= N.E.P. =

Russian rock band

- Origin: Leningrad, USSR
- Genres: New wave, post punk, alternative rock, funk metal, bard rock
- Members: Sergey Parashchuk (vocal, guitar); Marat Kapranov (lead guitar); German Kudryavtsev (bass); Evgeny Zhdanov (saxophone); Dmitry Klimenko (drums)
- Past members: Evgeny Lyovin, Igor Romanov, Andrey Vdovichenko

N.E.P. (Russian: Н.Э.П.) is a Russian rock band formed in 1988 in Saint Petersburg, then Leningrad, and widely credited as a legend of Russian rock music and classics of Russian rock, according to the biggest national mainstream rock radio.

== History ==
The band was formed in January 1988 by Sergey Parashchuk, who has been leading it to the present. Emerging from the 1980s Soviet rock movement, which was among the most influential drivers of social change in the USSR but was soon to end, the band still managed to make it to the elite of Leningrad rock, the key echelon of the rock movement, before the Leningrad Rock Club vanished together with the socialist system, succeeded by a lot of new Saint Petersburg musical clubs at times when rock music was none of the influence it used to enjoy.

The name of the band is an initialism commonly referring to the New Economic Policy adopted by Lenin's government in the 1920s. However, there are alternative interpretations of the band's name: for example, Let this Perestroyka go to hell (Russian Нафиг Эту Перестройку).

In 1988 the new band qualified and successfully performed at the Rock Club's yearly festival. In the same year it recorded its first album entitled 70 Moments of Spring. Initially the band in its sound and image followed the leaders of Leningrad and Soviet rock music – Alisa and Televizor.

In 1990 N.E.P. released a new album, Dissonance. From 1993 the band's leader Sergey Parashchuk, along with musicians of DDT and Alisa, made up a supergroup named Duby Kolduny performing Soviet-era pop hits, which existed till 1996. The main act performed in Russia not much, but had several European tours, visiting such countries as France, Germany etc. During the 1990s the band output two more original albums, Pro... (1991) and Veter Vagonov / Railcar Wind (1994).

By 2003 the band faced a serious challenge, left by a few of its past members, who had gone to other bands such as Alisa.

The end of the decade was marked by a revival of the band featuring a refreshed and consolidated lineup. In 2012 and 2013 it took part in the biggest Russian open-air rock festival Nashestvie run by the nationwide pop rock Nashe Radio. N.E.P. resumed an intense activity performing at Saint Petersburg and national clubs.

In a 2013 interview for the rock magazine Rocketsmusic, Sergey Parashchuk unveiled the band's current plan to record a long-awaited new album.

== Discography ==
=== Studio albums ===
- 70 Moments of Spring (1988)
- Dissonance (1990)
- Pro... (1991)
- Veter Vagonov / Railcar Wind (1994)
- Encyclopedia of Russian rock. NEP (compilation, 2001)
