= Apple Crumble =

Apple crumble is a dessert made from apples baked with a crumbled streusel topping.

Apple Crumble may also refer to:

- Apple Crumble, a 2019 album by Winston Surfshirt
- "Apple Crumble" (song), by Lime Cordiale and Idris Elba, 2021

== See also ==
- Apple Pie (disambiguation)
