= InProg =

Russian rock festival

InProg was an international progressive rock festival held almost yearly since 2001 in Moscow, Russia. The festival was organised by the Russian Rock-magazine InRock.

The organizers of this festival called it "a festival of intellectual music", because except giving to progressive rock artists to perform they also give to Jazz and other genre artists to perform. The official slogan of the festival is "Music for the brains".

Though there was an InProg 2007 festival planned, it did not take place because of a low financial situation. "InProg on the Hills" has continued in 2011. A mix of Russian and Ukraine bands played there, including well-known Sunchild.

== List of all festivals and performers ==
InProg on the Hills 2011 (10 – 13 June)

Art-Nechto (Arkhangelsk-Moscow), Introspective F.M. (Yaroslavl'), Uphill Work (Moscow), Eternal Wanderers (Moscow), Cracked Rombix (Moscow), Sunchild (Kharkiv, Ukraine), Mystic Morrison Visions (Volzhskiy, Russia), Chikiss (St.Petersburg).

InProg on the Hills 2010 (11 – 13 June)

Uphill Work, Syncopated Silence, Olga Dzusova & SS-20, Orgia Pravednikov (All – Moscow, Russia), Kusudama (Minsk, Belarus) – main progrock/metal/etc. set at 11 June. "Orgia" show was a big success.
Vespero (Astrakhan'), Klever (St.Petersburg), Cracked Rombix (Moscow), Mouches a l'Orange (Soligorsk, Belarus) – psychedelic set at 13 June. Due to dysfunctional stage/weather conditions it was moved to different stage and went late night and in-between reggae (!!!) set; weird mix indeed.

InProg 2009 (24 October)

Beardfish (Sweden), Vespero (Russia), The Worm Ouroboros (Belarus), Jazzator (Russia).

InProg on the Hills 2009 (12 – 13 June)

Jazzator, Vespero, Kostarev Group. Most of the planned bands were cancelled.

Ecco Prog Fest 2008 (29 November)

Flower Kings (Sweden), Apple Pie (Russia), Batisfera (Russia) and Kostarev Group (Russia).

InProg on the Hills 2008 (12 June)

Rational Diet (Belarus), Disen Gage (Russia), Inner Drive (Russia), Batisfera (Russia), EXIT project (Russia), Olga Dzusova & SS-20 (Russia), Kaftan Smeha (Russia).
On 13 June, progressive rock bands Kostarev Group (Russia) and The Skys (Lithuania) also played.

InProg 2006 (9 April and 23 April)

Day 1 – Vicheslav Gorskiy & Kvadro, EXIT project, Blind Vandal, Olle Lukoye, Kaftan Smeha, a Jam session of different musicians led by Alexander Kostarev, who was specially invited to lead the Jam session.
Day 2 – Little Tragedies, Azazello, Extrovert, Nightingale (Sweden).

- All performers from Russia, except where noted.

InProg 2005 (14–15 May)

Day 1 – Samla Mammas Manna (Sweden), Tanquam, Invisible Front, Andrey Suchilin and Do Major Neo.
Day 2 – Olive Mess (Latvia), Hidria Spacefolk (Finland), Kostarev Group, Marimba Plus, Disen Gage.

- All performers from Russia, except where noted.

InProg 2004 (11 April)

Arsenal, Kostarev Group, Disengage, NYL, Metropolis.

InProg 2003 (15, 22 February)

Day 1 – Nova Art, Orgiya Pravednikov, Face-X, Azazello.
Day 2 – NYL, Kostarev Group, Azazello.

- There was also a one-day InProg 2003 festival in Sankt Peterburg (16 February).

InProg 2001 (11 November)

Azazello, Face-X, NYL, Nordream, Elisium.

== See also ==
- Russian rock
