= Perekrestok =

Perekrestok or Perekryostok, Russian for crossroads, may refer to:

- Perekrestok (supermarket chain), a Russian supermarket chain
- Perekrestok, a Soviet rock band associated with Alexander Kostarev
