= Mify =

Russian rock band

Mify (Russian: «Мифы», lit. 'The Myths') are a rock band formed in Leningrad in 1966.

== History ==
=== 1966-1967: The Red Roosters ===
The history of the group began in September 1966, when Sergey Danilov and Gennadiy Barikhnovskiy were both eighth-graders at School No. 216 in the Kirovsky District of Leningrad. In the midst of Beatlemania and the popularity of rock and roll, they decided to start their own group. In one of their early performances as a duet, they played music from the film Lyudi nad oblakami (Russian: «Люди над облаками», lit. 'People above the clouds') at a school event. Soon after, Dmitry Zadvornov, then a freshman, joined the group as a vocalist.

Soon after, Vyacheslav Legzdin replaced Bezdudnov on bass and the group changed their name to Mify (Russian: Мифы, lit. 'The Myths'). The band's first performance under the new name took place on November 7, 1967.

=== 1967-1974: Early years of Mify ===
Before the members graduated from school, the group performed at their own school, School No. 501, and at the Seltso sovkhoz. Drummer Valeriy Sorokin was replaced by Sergey Petrov, who had previously played in a group at School No. 501. Zadvornov left the group and Barikhnovsky took over the vocals.

At the end of 1967, Mify took the second place in a district-wide competition of school ensembles. They went on a city-wide tour and came fourth in that competition. A portion of their performance was played in a radio program dedicated to the competition. The members of Gorizont (Russian: «Горизонт», lit. 'Horizon'), the group that won the competition, advised the members of Mify to join the choir at the Pioneers Palace. Danilov, Barikhnovsky and Legzdin followed this advice and learned to sing vocal harmonies.

In the summer of 1969, Yuri Ilchenko joined the group. The first performance in the updated line-up (Danilov, Barikhnovskiy, Ilchenko, and Petrov) took place in October, in the club of the village of Pargolovo. Mify played at dance parties in Pargolovo and Toksovo, performing the English-language pop-rock standards that were popular at that time. Their repertoire included songs from The Beatles, The Rolling Stones, and others. The group's few original songs at the time included "Ya padayu, padayu" (Russian: «Я падаю, падаю», lit. 'I Fall, Fall'), several instrumental compositions, and a couple of English-language sketches.

In early 1970, guitarist and singer Yuri Bushev joined the group. In the same year, Yuri Ilchenko was drafted into the army, and the group was left without a main vocalist. Mify dissolved and the former band members joined VIA acts.

After serving the requisite two years in the army, Ilchenko returned and Mify reformed with new members in 1972. From this point on, the group performed original songs in Russian while remaining a non-professional act. In 1973, Danilov and Barikhnovsky attempted to write and stage their own rock opera, Vremya (Russian: «Время», lit. 'Time'), about the generation gap. The opera remained unfinished, but some of the songs from it entered the group's repertoire.

At the end of 1973, Sergey Petrov left for the army and Viktor Gukov replaced him as drummer. The group's first success came in January 1974, when Mify shared first place with Evgeny Myasnikov's group Zemlyane — Atlas (Russian: «Земляне — Атлас») in a contest of amateur bands in Leningrad, and Sergey Danilov was named the best guitarist. At a contest for amateur bands in Moscow in the same year, Mify performed on equal terms with such groups as Mashina Vremeni and Tsvety, which were already popular at that time. In this competition, Barikhnovskiy was recognized as the best bass player and Ilchenko was recognized as the best vocalist.

=== 1974-1975: Lyudi Levenshteina ===
During 1974 the group went through several drummers: Victor Gukov, Andrey “Kuznechik” Alekseev, and Victor Dombrovsky. In the summer of that year, Mify fell apart again as Ilchenko left the group. The members began to perform separately again: Ilchenko worked at the Philharmonic, and Danilov and Barikhnovsky played at dances at the White Hall in Pushkin, in a group led by Vsevolod Levenshtein.

In March 1975, Mify were invited to participate in several concerts in Tallinn. Danilov and Barikhnovsky hastily assembled a touring line-up, with Aleksandr Ivanov from Letuchiy Gollandets (Russian: «Летучий голландец», lit. 'Flying Dutchman') on drums and Oleg "Alik" Azarov from Rossianye (Russian: «Россияне») on keyboards. The Estonian concerts were considered a great success, and the group took first place in the competition. Following their success in the Tallinn Festival, the group recorded their hit “Madison Street” (Russian: «Мэдисон-стрит») for Estonian television. The clip was broadcast in the Baltic states.

It was decided to extend the existence Mify for another season, with yet another line-up change. At this point, the group was composed of Barikhnovskiy (bass, vocals), Danilov (guitar, some vocals), Ilchenko (guitar, vocals), Mikhail "Michael" Kordyukov (drums), Vsevolod Levenshtein (saxophone), and Yuri Stepanov (grand piano, vocals).

Levenshtein participated in the group not only as a musician, but also by conducting the group's affairs, organizing concerts, and performing other production duties. Before joining Mify, Levenshtein had led the VIA Dobry Molodtsy (Russian: «Добры Молодцы») for two years. Mify existed for some time under the unofficial name Lyudi Levenshteina (Russian: «Люди Левенштейна», lit. 'People of Levenshtein'). However, the group only performed under this name once: at a jazz concert organized by jazz expert Grigory Frank, the sound engineer of Leningrad television, in the spring of 1975. For this occasion, Levenshtein invited a couple of familiar professional jazz players to play along with the group. At rare underground concerts, the group performed under its real name. In November 1975, having left Mify, Levenshtein also left the Soviet Union.

=== 1975-1979: Yuri Ilchenko, Mashina Vremeni, and Voskreseniye ===
Yuri Ilchenko returned to the group in the autumn of 1975. Mify adopted a jazz-rock sound, introducing a brass section with Oleg Kuvaitsev and Albert Rachkin on saxophone, Yuri Gantsev on trumpet, and Viktor Musorov and Valery Zavarin on trombone.

In the spring of 1976, Mify participated the competition for amateur ensembles “Spring Key” in the Gaza Palace of Culture and subsequently toured Moscow, without much success. At around the same time, Mify gave a concert at the Krupskaya Palace of Culture in Leningrad. This concert also marked the debut of the Moscow group Mashina Vremeni on the Leningrad stage, and Mify's set left a strong impression on Andrei Makarevich, the leader of Mashina Vremeni.

A couple of months later, Mashina Vremeni again visited Leningrad. After one concert, Ilchenko decided to join Mashina Vremeni and go back to Moscow with them. For eight months, Ilchenko lived in Andrei Makarevich's apartment and performed with Mashina Vremeni. Several of Mify's compositions entered Mashina Vremeni's repertoire. In particular, the song “Shock” was later published on the disc Eto bylo tak davno (Russian: «Это было так давно», lit. 'It was so long ago').

During this time, Danilov played with the jazz-rock band Dve Radugi (Russian: Две радуги, lit. 'Two Rainbows') and Petrov played with Yuri Morozov.

In early 1977, Ilchenko returned to Leningrad with the rest of Mashina Vremeni. Ilchenko attempted to organize a new supergroup called Voskreseniye (Russian: Воскресение, lit. 'Resurrection') with members of Mify. However, this group did not last long and disbanded after giving several concerts. In the same year, Danilov went to prison on charges of possession and use of drugs, and Mify again dissolved.

Over the next few years, Ilchenko participated in a variety of projects. In 1977, Ilchenko took part in the creation of the Soviet Union's first underground rock magazine Roksi (Russian: «Рокси»), acting as an editor and journalist. When Mashina Vremeni broke up in the following spring, its members Evgeny Margulis and Sergey Kavagoe decided to call Ilchenko again. Ilchenko saw this as a chance to resurrect his group Voskreseniye, but due to illness, he was not able to take part in the project. The former members of Mashina Vremeni thus formed the Moscow group Voskreseniye. In 1978 Ilchenko recorded an acoustic album Dozhd (Russian: «Дождь», lit. 'Rain'), which was included in Roksi's unofficial hit parade. At the end of 1979, Ilchenko joined the official pop ensemble Zemlyane (Russian: «Земляне», lit. 'Earthlings'), replacing Igor Romanov. Ilchenko remained in Zemlyane for a year before moving on to Integral (Russian: «Интеграл»).

=== 1980-present: Debut album and later tours ===
In 1979, Andrei Tropillo had started his underground recording studio AnTrop and decided to begin full-fledged studio recordings of Leningrad rock bands. Tropillo conducted his first studio experiments with Mify's keyboard player, Yuri Stepanov, and Olga Pershina. In 1980, Danilov was released from prison and Mify was revived.

On March 7, 1981, Mify performed at the opening ceremony of the Leningrad Rock Club, alongside Rossianye and Picnic. In the same year, they performed at a festival in the Nevsky Palace of Culture and completed the recording of their debut album Doroga domoi (Russian: «Дорога домой», lit. 'The road home') on AnTrop.

In 1983, Mify and Aquarium tied for second place at the first Leningrad rock festival, with Manufaktura taking first place. Mify also received a prize for the anti-war song "Otvetny udar" (Russian: «Ответный удар», lit. 'Counter strike').

The group continued to perform, with changed line-ups and occasional hiatuses, over the next few decades. As of 2019, Mify were still active.

== Band members ==
Current line-up:

- Gennadiy Barikhnovskiy — vocals, guitar
- Aleksandr Sokolov — guitar, vocals
- Sergey Pugachyov — bass
- Dmitriy Kalinin — keyboards
- Vladimir Manuylov — saxophone
- Viktor Morozov — drums

At different times, many famous musicians have played with the group.

List of the noteworthy former members:

- Vsevolod (Seva) Levenshtein (Dobry molodtsy (Russian: «Добры молодцы»), Icarus) — saxophone
- Mikhail "Michael" Kordyukov (Aquarium, Trilistnik (Russian: «Трилистник»)) — drums
- Mikkhail Vladimirov (Azart (Russian: «Азарт»), Chizh & Co)— guitar
- Roman Kaporin (Deti (Russian: «Дети», lit. 'Children'))— saxophone
- Oleg "Alik" Azarov (Rossianye (Russian: «Россияне», lit. 'The Russians')) — grand piano
- Aleksandr Novikov (Lotus (Russian: «Лотос»)) — guitar
- Dmitry Makoviz (Lotus (Russian: «Лотос»))— keyboards
- Dmitry Filippov (Lotus (Russian: «Лотос»))— drums
- Vladimir Gadenov (VIA Sinyaya Ptitsa (Russian: «Синяя Птица», lit. 'Blue Bird'), Cherry Wine) — bass

== Discography ==
There are no recordings of Mify from the 1970s, when Yuri Ilchenko led the group.

=== Tape releases ===
- 1980 - Proschai, chyornaya subbota (Russian: «Прощай, чёрная суббота») (solo album by Yuri Stepanov with the participation of members of Mify)
- 1981 - Doroga domoi (Russian: «Дорога домой», lit. 'The road home')
- 1987 - Mifologiya (Russian: «Мифология», lit. 'Mythology')
- 1989 - Bey, kolokol! (Russian: «Бей, колокол!»)

=== Official releases ===
- 1988 - Madison Street (Russian: «Мэдисон-стрит») (Melodiya)
- 1990 - Bey, kolokol!!! (Russian: «Бей, колокол!!!») (Melodiya)
- 1992 - Vniz golovoy (Russian: «Вниз головой») (Cobweb Records)
- 1994 - Mifologiya (Russian: «Мифология», lit. 'Mythology') (NP-Records)
- 2010 - Chto budet potom... (Russian: «Что будет потом...») (Bomba-Piter)
