= Apple Pie (disambiguation) =

Apple pie is a dessert made from apples and pastry.

Apple Pie or apple-pie may also refer to:

== Film and television ==
- Apple Pie, a 1976 film with Irene Cara
- Apple Pie (TV series), a 1978 American sitcom
- "Apple Pie" (Teletubbies), a 1999 television episode

== Music ==
- Apple Pie (band), a Russian progressive rock band
- Apple Pie (album), by Nice, 1993
- "Apple Pie", a song by Fiestar, 2016
- "Apple Pie", a song by Hearts2Hearts from Focus, 2025
- "Apple Pie", a song by Lizzy McAlpine from Give Me a Minute, 2020
- "Apple Pie", a song by Michel Berger featuring Bill Withers, 1982
- "Apple Pie", a song by Teenage Joans from Taste of Me, 2021
- "Apple Pie", a song by Todrick Hall from Forbidden, 2018
- "Apple Pie", a song by Travis Scott from Rodeo, 2015

== Other uses ==
- Apple Pie ABC, an alphabet rhyme for children
- Apple Pie Hill, an elevation in Burlington County, New Jersey, US
- Epilobium hirsutum, a wild plant with the local name apple-pie
