= Hidria Spacefolk =

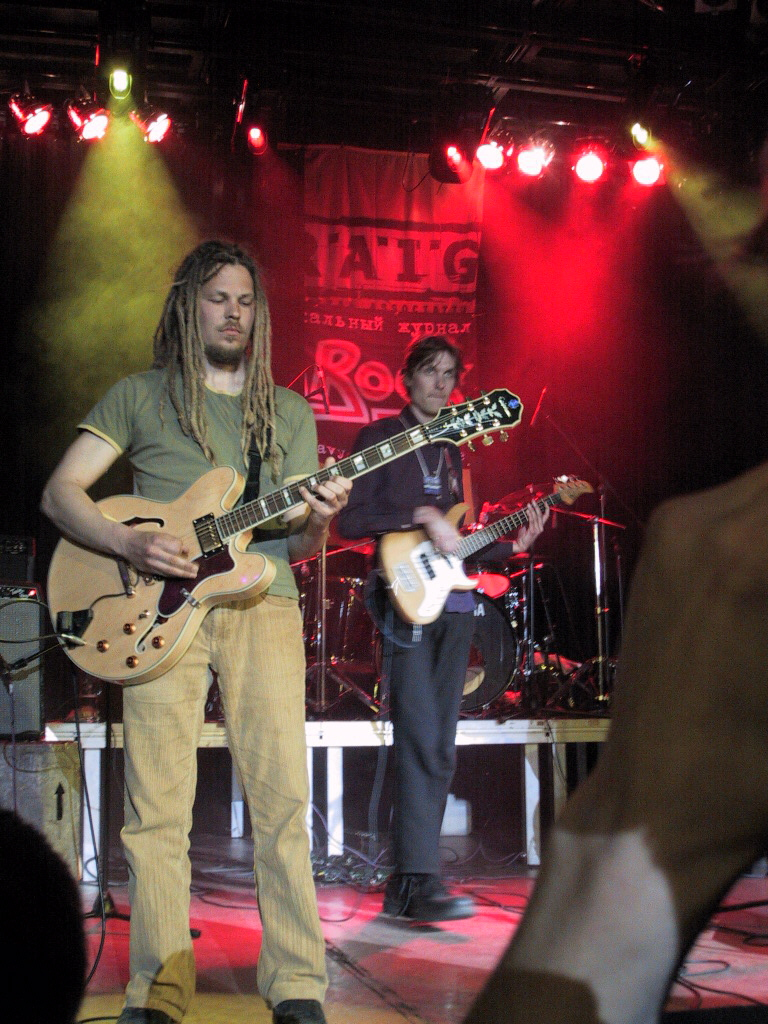
- Hidria Spacefolk in Moscow at InProg 2005

Background information
- Origin: Lohja, Finland
- Genres: Progressive rock Psychedelic rock Space rock
- Years active: 1999 – Present
- Labels: Wolfgang Records; Exogenic Records
- Website: http://www.hidriaspacefolk.st/

Hidria Spacefolk is a Finnish progressive / psychedelic rock / space rock band. The group's sound is often compared to Kingston Wall and Ozric Tentacles. The band describes their musical style as Astro-Beat. They use many different instruments such as the cello, violin, flute, didgeridoo, marimba, mandolin, sitar and vibraphone.

Hidria Spacefolk's first album was the independently released EP HDRSF-1 in 2001. Their debut full-length, Symbiosis, was released a year later through Silence, a subsidiary label of Wolfgang Records. The band's second full-length album, Balansia, was released in 2004 and included Andy McCoy of Hanoi Rocks as a guest musician. The same year, a compilation album titled Violently Hippy rmxs was also released. The album contains remixes of Hidria Spacefolk's songs done by Finnish electronic music makers.

Their performance at the North East Art Rock Festival in Pennsylvania, US (July 2004) was released as Live Eleven am, in 2005.

In 2005 the band opened the second day of the international progressive rock festival that took place in Moscow, Russia.

== Members ==
- Mikko Happo – guitars
- Sami Wirkkala – guitars
- Veikko Aallonhuippu (formerly Sutinen) – keyboards & synths (2008- )
- Olli Kari – Xylosynth, mallets & percussions (2010- and on albums Symbiosis, Balansia)
- Kimmo Dammert – bass
- Teemu Kilponen – drums

== Hidria Family ==
- Janne Lounatvuori – keyboards (1999-2008)

== Discography ==
- HDRSF-1 (2001, EP)
- Symbiosis (2002)
- Balansia (2004)
- Violently Hippy rmxs (2004, compilation)
- Live Eleven am (2005, live recording)
- Symetria (2007)
- Live at Heart (2007, live recording)
- Cycloop (2012, single)
- Astronautica (2012)
- Göbekli Tepe (2024, single)
- Rama Rama (2024, single)
