= Mark Yoffe =

American anthropologist (born 1958)

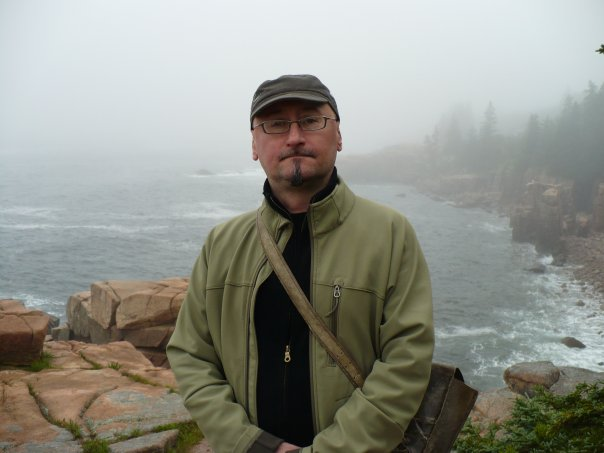
- Born: 20 March 1958 (age 68); Riga, Latvia
- Education: University of Michigan
- Occupations: Curator, anthropologist, cultural commentator
- Scientific career
- Fields: Cultural anthropology, counterculture under repressive regimes
- Workplaces: The George Washington University Gelman Library
- Website: http://home.gwu.edu/~yoffe/

Mark Yoffe (Russian: Марк Елхононович Иоффе) is an American cultural anthropologist, ethnologist, folklorist, culture critic who founded and curates of the International Counterculture Archive at the Global Resources Center at the George Washington University in Washington, DC.

He specializes in study of countercultures, subcultures, youth and dissident movements, samizdat, and rock music under conservative and dictatorial regimes. A special focus of his interest is Soviet and Russian youth counterculture, along with history and traditions of Soviet and Russian rock music. He is the first academic, Western or Russian, to write and defend a doctoral dissertation dedicated to ethnographic study of Soviet hippies and tradition and stylistics of Soviet rock music.

His current interests include Slavic folklore, vampire lore, the history of Soviet and Russian youth counterculture, the history of Soviet dissident movements, the history of Third Wave émigré publishing, émigré experience in the United States, the adaptation of Anglo-American pop music in the non-English speaking world, subversive humor and satire, stiob, rock music and nationalism, rock music and humor, and the history of Washington, DC hardcore punk rock.

With his two groundbreaking articles on theory and practice of stiob, a form of humorous ironic discourse utilized by Russian counterculture, Yoffe contributed greatly to understanding of this complex rhetorical phenomenon.

In his recent political activism, Mark Yoffe spent considerable energies supporting jailed Russian art-collective Pussy Riot through writings, public speeches, lectures, and interviews. He also wrote and lectured extensively on the death of Aaron Swartz.

== Early life ==
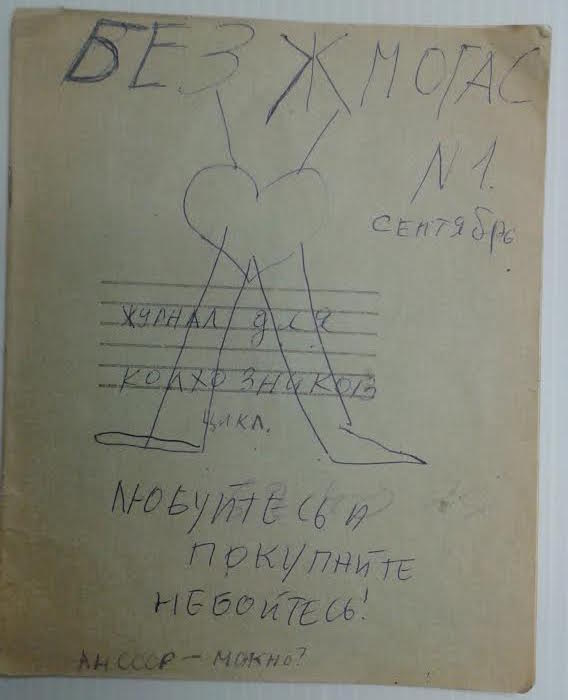
Bez Zhmogas, the first known Soviet rock zine, authored by Mark Yoffe and Valery Petropavlovsky

The son of musician and music historian Elkhonon Yoffe and Russian literature teacher Lidia Yoffe (nee Artiushina), Mark Yoffe was born in Riga, Latvia, then part of the Soviet Union. His family spoke Russian at home and he attended Russian schools in Riga. In 1975, he entered Latvian State University in the department of Russian philology where he was a student until 1977. Unable to pass an exam on the history of the Communist Party during his third semester of study, Mark Yoffe took extended leave of absence during which he received drawing and design tutoring from Yurii Petropavlovsky, presently a controversial Latvian political activist. In 1977, Mark Yoffe was admitted into Riga's psychiatric facility, hoping to receive an exemption from Soviet military service. After 21 days at the facility he received the desired exemption, which opened the door for emigration to the United States.

In his late teens Mark Yoffe associated with a group of Russian-speaking hippies, bohemians, students and artists in Riga. Together with his high school friend Valery Petropavlovsky, he published the first known Soviet rock zine, Bez Zhmogas, in 1977. Together, they also produced underground art and literature almanac Дело #1, and several underground satirical rock opera librettos, novels and short stories. Together with Valery Petropavlovsky, he formed garage avant-garde ensemble Путь толстых ("The way of the fat ones") which practiced home-studio recordings of “concrete” and conceptual music and parodic audio plays.

On April 1, 1978, together with his parents and fox-terrier Lada, he left Latvia for the USA. After a mandatory stay of a few months in Austrian and Italian refugee camps, he and his family arrived in New York City on June 6, 1978.

== Education ==
In the spring of 1983, Yoffe graduated from Queens College, City University of New York. There he studied Russian literature and culture under professors Albert Todd, Thomas Bird, and, most importantly, Vera Sandomirsky-Dunham, who “discovered” his abilities as a student of Russian literature and recommended him for graduate work to Department of Slavic Languages and Literatures at the University of Michigan.

At the University of Michigan, Yoffe was warmly welcomed by the Chair of the Department Benjamin Stolz, Professors Assya Humesky, Deming Brown, Horace Dewey. But he developed a special relationship and long lasting friendship with Gogol, 18th century, and skaz specialist Irwin R. Titunik, who became one of the greatest influences upon his academic development. Initially, Mark Yoffe was planning to write his doctoral dissertation on “Holy fool stylistics” found in the 17th century religious polemist's Archpriest Avvakum writings. In 1989, though, Yoffe suddenly changed his plans and embarked on working on his groundbreaking dissertation dedicated to Soviet youth counterculture, ethnography of Soviet hippies and traditions and stylistics on which Soviet rock music was based. What prompted him to change his scholarly focus was his acquaintance with works of Soviet rock of the time of Perestroika, particularly an album titled Red Wave published in the West by Joanna Stingray in 1986, album of music by Moscow band Zvuki Mu produced in UK and USA by Brian Eno in 1989 and the album Radio Silence by Leningrad musician Boris Grebenshchikov and his band, Aquarium, produced in the UK and USA by David A. Stewart.

Yoffe defended his dissertation in August 1991 and left Ann Arbor with his family for Washington DC in December 1991.

He also received a Master of Library Science degree from the University of Michigan School of Information in 1989.

== Career and work with the International Counterculture Archive ==
In Washington DC, Yoffe first worked as a cataloging consultant for the European Division of the Library of Congress in March 1992. In 1993, he undertook a trip to Moscow sponsored by the International Research & Exchanges Board (IREX) to collect materials—mostly underground rock recordings, zines, and ephemera—for what later became Yoffe's International Counterculture Archive. The first part of the archive collected during that trip to Moscow is, as of 2016, in custody of the Library of Congress's European Division.

From 1994 to December 1995, Yoffe worked as a consultant cataloger for the American History Museum and NASA Headquarters Library. In December 1994, he started as a part-time Slavic languages cataloger at the Gelman Library of the George Washington University. In December 1995, he was hired as a full–time Slavic Languages Librarian by the Gelman library. Once at Gelman library as a full-fledged staff member, Yoffe recreated the International Counterculture Archive under a new roof and with the support and sponsorship of the Gelman Library. By agreement with the Library of Congress, the International Counterculture Archive received copies of all the zines and other printed materials Yoffe collected in Moscow during his 1993 trip.

The International Counterculture Archive kept growing through numerous field work trips to Russia and the former Soviet Union in 1998, 2002, 2008, and 2012. The focus of the archive has expended from Russia and the former Soviet Union and started to include counterculture productions from a variety of authoritarian and conservative regimes. Yoffe conducted his field work in Russia, Latvia, Estonia, Poland, Czech Republic, Hungary, Slovenia, Croatia, Bulgaria, Turkey, Armenia, France, Finland, Denmark, Argentina and the United States. The International Counterculture Archive is a unique collection that contains dissident musical recordings from these countries, among others. The International Counterculture Archive is the largest collection of Soviet and Russian rock music zines in the US and one of the largest in the West. Since 2007, the International Counterculture Archive has belonged to the Global Resources Center of George Washington University Libraries. In addition to curating ICA at the Global Resources Center, Yoffe also curates the Peter Reddaway Soviet Samizdat Archive, one of the largest collections of Soviet Samizdat in the USA donated by Soviet dissident supporter and political activist GWU Professor of Political Science Peter Reddaway.

Mark Yoffe organizes exhibits of the materials in the collections and curates, publishes and lectures widely on the subjects that interest him: history of Russian rock music, Russian political activism, Russian youth counterculture, and rock music in the non-Anglo-American world. During Pussy Riot's arrest and trial he was a very vocal supporter of the jailed members of the art collective, speaking on their behalf at Amnesty International rallies, at a Future of Music Coalition summit, giving multiple interviews and appearing on public radio and Voice of America TV.

In September and October 2007, again sponsored by IREX, he worked as a consulting ethnologist on behalf of the US Embassy in Armenia studying the Armenian Yazidi and Kurdish communities.

In 2009 he was a rock music blogger for Voice of America's Russian service and continues to be a frequent guest on VOA TV and radio programs.

He has taught variety of courses including: 20th-century Russian literature, late 20th-century Russian cinema, Vampires in folklore and popular culture, Comparative Counterculture, Rock Music in Non-English speaking countries, Slavic Pagan Pantheon at GWU, Indiana University, and Tallinn University in Estonia. He lectures often on these topics domestically and internationally.

He is a member of the Association for Slavic, East European, and Eurasian Studies.

Mark Yoffe has one son, Bruno Yoffe, from his first marriage, who lives in Pittsburgh, PA. Mark Yoffe lives with his wife Lissa Rosenthal-Yoffe in SW Washington, DC.

== Selected bibliography ==
=== Books ===
- Perun the God of Thunder, (co-written with Joseph Krafszik, Univ. of Wyoming), Peter Lang, New York, May 2003.
- Rock’n’Roll and Nationalism: a Multinational Perspective, (contributor and co-editor with Andrea Collins), Cambridge Scholars Press, UK, Dec. 2005.

=== Essays ===
- Hippies in the Baltic: The Rock'n'roll Era, Cross Currents, Ann Arbor, 1988.
- Vladimir Zhirinovsky, The Unholy Fool, Current History, Philadelphia, October 1994.
- Back into the Underground: Russian Rock'n'roll Community in Search of New Adversaries and Identities, East European Meetings in Ethnomusicology, Bucharest, 2000. p. 105-112.
- History of Soviet/Russian Rock, 10000 word entry for Encyclopedia of Popular Music of the World, Vol. 2: Locations, Continuum, London, Fall 2004.

=== Obituaries ===
- Yegor Letov, Wednesday, April 23, 2008, The Guardian
- Chingiz Aitmatov, Monada, July 14, 2008, The Guardian
- Vasily Aksenov, Wednesday, July 15, 2009, The Guardian
