= Disen Gage =

Russian rock band

- Origin: Moscow, Russia
- Genres: Progressive rock, hard rock, instrumental rock, avant-rock
- Years active: 1999–2002, 2004–present
- Label: R.A.I.G.
- Members: Konstantin Mochalov (guitar) (1999–2002, 2004–present); Nikolay Syrtsev (bass) (1999–2002, 2004–present); Eugeniy Kudryashov (drums) (1999–2002, 2004–present); Fyodor Amirov (keyboard) (2015–present)
- Past members: Yuri Alaverdyan (guitar) (1999–2002, 2004); Sergey Bagin (guitar) (2004–2015)
- Website: disengage.ru/

Disen Gage is a Russian rock band from Moscow.

== History ==
The band was formed in 1999 by Yuri Alaverdyan and Konstantin Mochalov on guitars, Nikolay Syrtsev on bass guitar and Evgeniy Kudryashov on drums.

Despite having gained a certain degree of popularity in intellectual and student's communities, the band members decided to stop their musical activities: they were too busy pursuing their academic careers in the Moscow Institute of Bio-Organic Chemistry at the time.

In 2004 their recorded material reached the RAIG music label, which released it as the band's debut album under the title The Screw-Loose Entertainment. The album received positive reviews at many web sites, including Dutch Progressive Rock Page, Delusions of Adequacy (USA), In Rock (Russia), Grrove (Sweden), Splendid (USA), Progwereld (Netherlands), Art Rock Pl (Poland), Chaos Vault (Poland), and Mmusic in Belgium (Belgium), Nota-Bena (Russia), Impakte (Maroc). The album received a 9/10 rating from the Disagreement web site.

The success of the debut album prompted the band to resume its normal activity.

Later in 2004 Yuri Alaverdyan left both the country and the band for an academic career abroad.

In 2006 Disen Gage released its second album, Libertage which received Neformat-Boom (Russia), In Rock (Russia), Nota-Bena (Russia), Salon Audio-Video (Russia), Muz-Prosvet (Ukraine).

In 2008 the Disen Gage released its third studio album, ...the reverse may be true. Stylistically, it blended the structural constraints of the debut with the improvisational freedom of their sophomore release. Like the previous two, this one received high marks, good reviews coming again from many different countries. Among those who praised the LP were Inoi Lip (Russia), Sonic Frontiers (USA), Rate Your Music (USA), Progwereld (The Netherlands), Sea of Tranquility (USA), DisAgreement (Luxembourg).

In 2015 Sergey Bagin left the band and the keyboardist Fyodor Amirov joined them.

== Trivia ==
- Libertage was spontaneously composed and improvised on the spot.
- The members of the group all continue with their academic careers besides their musical ones.
- On the poster of the InProg 2004 festival the name of the band was mistakenly printed in one word: Disengage.

== Discography ==
- The Screw-Loose Entertainment (2004, RAIG)
- Libertage (2006, RAIG)
- ...The Reverse May Be True (2008, RAIG)
- Snapshots (2016)
- Hybrid State (2017)
- Nature (2018)
- The Big Adventure (2019)

== See also ==
- Music of Russia
- Russian rock
