= Pilot (Russian band) =

Russian rock band

- Also known as: PilOt
- Origin: Saint Petersburg, Russia
- Genres: Rock; Punk rock Grunge (early); Industrial metal Experimental rock (later)
- Years active: 1997–present
- Members: Ilya "Chort" Knabengof; Alexey Svetlov; Nikita Belozyorov; Ivan Petrov
- Website: Official website

Pilot, also known as PilOt (Russian: Пилот, ПилОт) is a Russian rock band from Saint Petersburg, founded by Ilya Knabengof in 1997.

== History ==
The roots of the band stretch back to 1994, at which point it was called Military Jane.

Pilot performing in 2019

In April and May 2022, Pilot participated in a series of concerts organized in order to support the 2022 Russian invasion of Ukraine.

== Members ==
=== Current line-up ===
- Ilya "Chort" Knabengof (Илья "Чёрт" Кнабенгоф): vocals, guitar
- Alexey Svetlov: guitar
- Ivan Petrov: bass guitar
- Nikita Belozyorov: drums

== Discography ==
=== Albums ===
Year	Title
1997	Война (акустика) (War (Acoustics))
1998	Жывой Концерррт (Live Concert)
2001	Сказка о Прыгуне и Скользящем (Tale of the Jumper and the Sliding One)
2002	Наше Небо (Our Sky)
2002	Джоконда (Jaconda)
2003	Времена Года (мини-альбом) (Seasons (mini-album))
2004	Рыба, Крот и Свинья (A Fish, a Mole and a Pig)
2006	Ч/б (B/w)
2008	1+1=1
2009	Содружество (Community)
2011	Осень (Autumn)
2013	13
2015	Изолятор (Infirmary)
2016	Кукушка (Cuckoo)
2018	Пандора (Pandora)

=== Singles ===
Year	Title
2002	Времена Года (maxi-single)
2004	Проводник (single)
