= Sankt-Peterburg (band) =

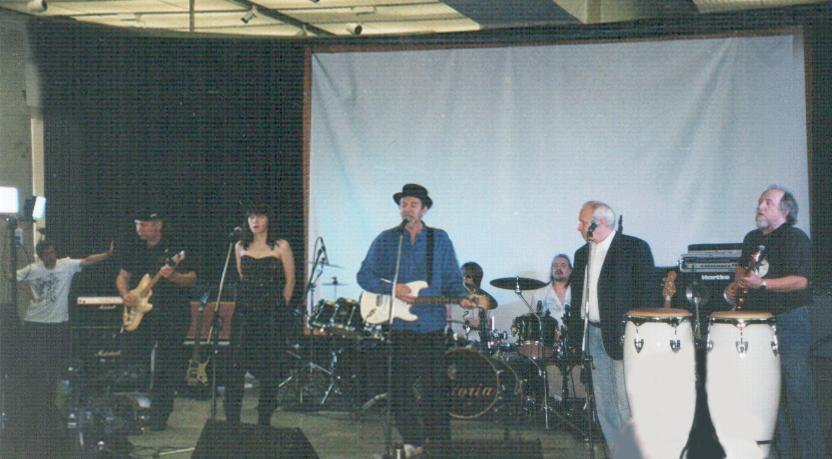
- Sankt-Peterburg in 2009

Background information
- Years active: 1960s–present

Sankt-Peterburg (Russian: Санкт-Петербург, lit. 'Saint Petersburg') is a Russian rock band, formed in 1969 in Leningrad. It is one of the oldest rock bands of the USSR. It was the first Soviet rock band to perform a program entirely of their own songs in Russian. At the time, the majority of Soviet rock bands were covering Anglo-American rock songs. The founder, leader, and only permanent member of the group is Vladimir Rekshan.

== Background ==
Sankt-Peterburg's lead singer, Vladimir Rekshan, was a pioneer of Russian language rock and roll songwriting in the early 70s. He was also criticized by audiences for singing in Russian. The group was also unfairly accused by propagandists of being monarchists.
