= Seva Novgorodsev =

British radio presenter and DJ

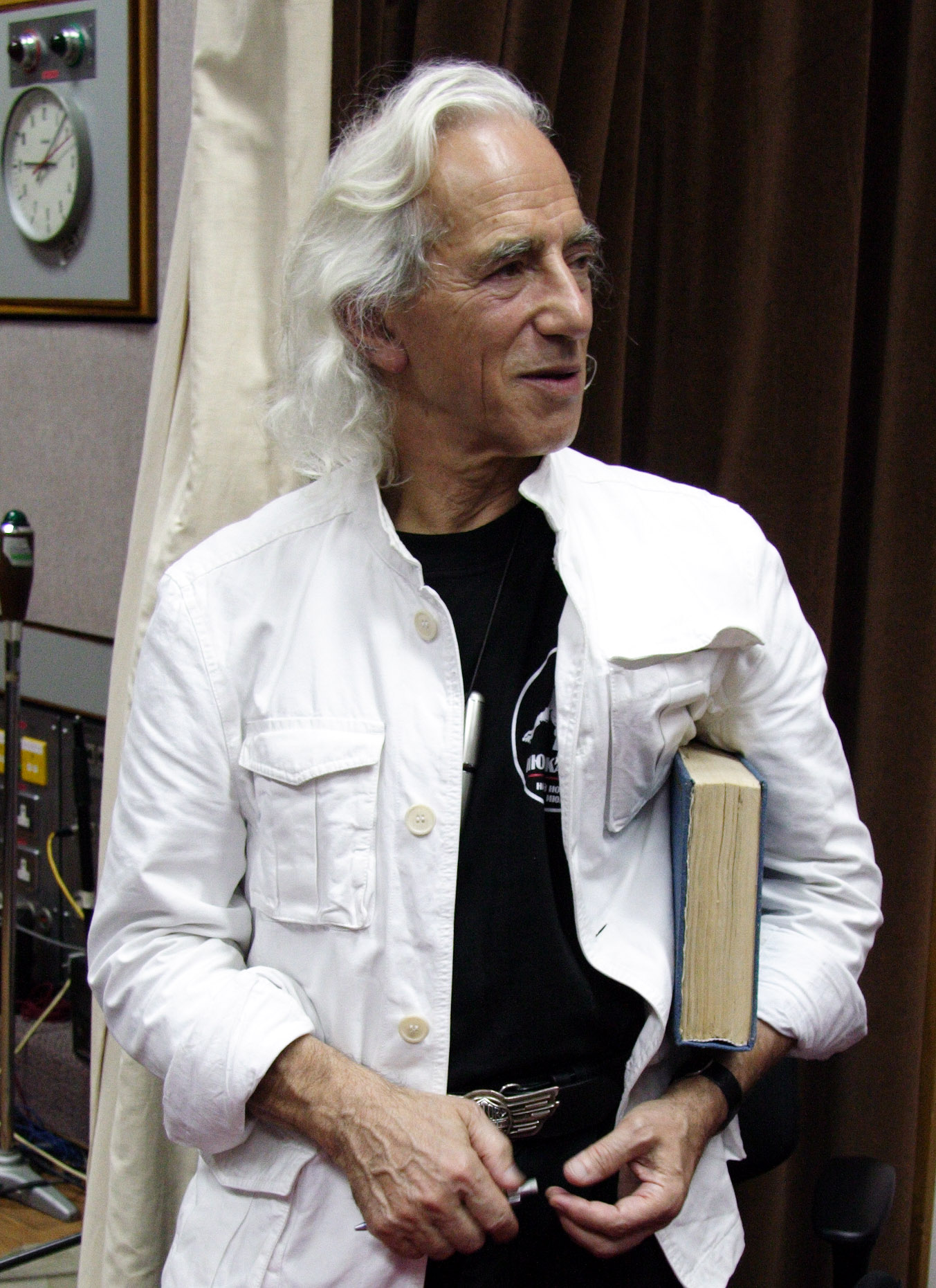
- Seva Novgorodsev in the BBC World Service studios in 2006
- Born: Vsevolod Borisovich Levenstein; 9 July 1940 (age 85); Leningrad, Russian SFSR, Soviet Union
- Occupation: Radio presenter
- Website: seva.ru

MBE Seva Levenstein-Novgorodsev (born Vsevolod Borisovich Levenshtein on 9 July 1940), better known as Seva Novgorodsev (Russian: Се́ва Новгоро́дцев), is a former radio presenter on the BBC Russian Service. He is famous throughout the former Soviet Union, being widely considered as Russia's first radio DJ.

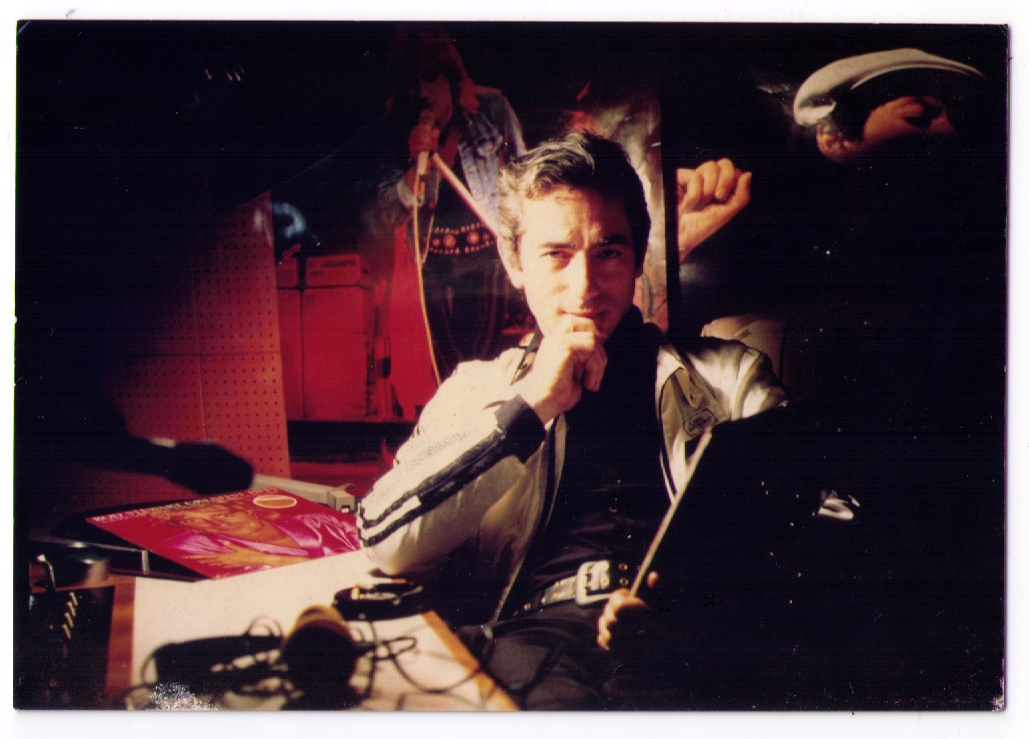
Seva Novgorodsev in the BBC World Service studio at Bush House, London, 1980.

== Biography ==
He created the music programme «Рок-посевы» ("Rock sowing" or "Rock crops", in Russian containing a pun with the name Seva) and the chat shows «Севаоборот» (Sevaoborot, a pun with the Russian word sevooborot, "crop rotation") and «БибиСева» (BBSeva). He has also written the books «Рок-Посевы» (Rock the Seva way) and «Секс, наркотики, рок-н-ролл» (Sex, drugs, rock 'n' roll).

He was Russia's first radio DJ, and has been featured in several Russian films. In 1981 he married actress Karen Craig, with whom he co-wrote a Russian cookbook for Sainsbury's in 1990, but they later divorced. He is now married to Olga, who is a designer.

On 4 September 2015, at the age of 75, Seva retired from broadcasting.

== Filmography ==
- A View to a Kill (1985) - Soviet Helicopter Pilot
- Spies Like Us (1985) - Tadzhik Highway Patrolman
- Leto (2018) - Antiquarian
