= Apple Pie (band) =

- Origin: Russia
- Genres: Progressive rock Progressive metal
- Years active: 2000–present
- Label: MALS
- Members: Vartan Mkhitaryan; Maxim Zhdanov; Andrey Golodukhin
- Past members: Oleg Sergeev; Aleksey Bildin
- Website: applepieband.org

Apple Pie are a Russian progressive rock band founded by Vartan Mkhitaryan in 2000. Their debut album, Crossroad, was released in 2007 by Russian rock label MALS.

== Discography ==
- Crossroad (2007)
- The Gates of Never (2013)

== Band members ==
- Vartan Mkhitaryan – vocals, guitars, keyboards
- Andrey Golodukhin – drums
- Maxim Zhdanov – bass, backing vocals
