= Alexander Kostarev =

Russian progressive rock musician (born 1954)

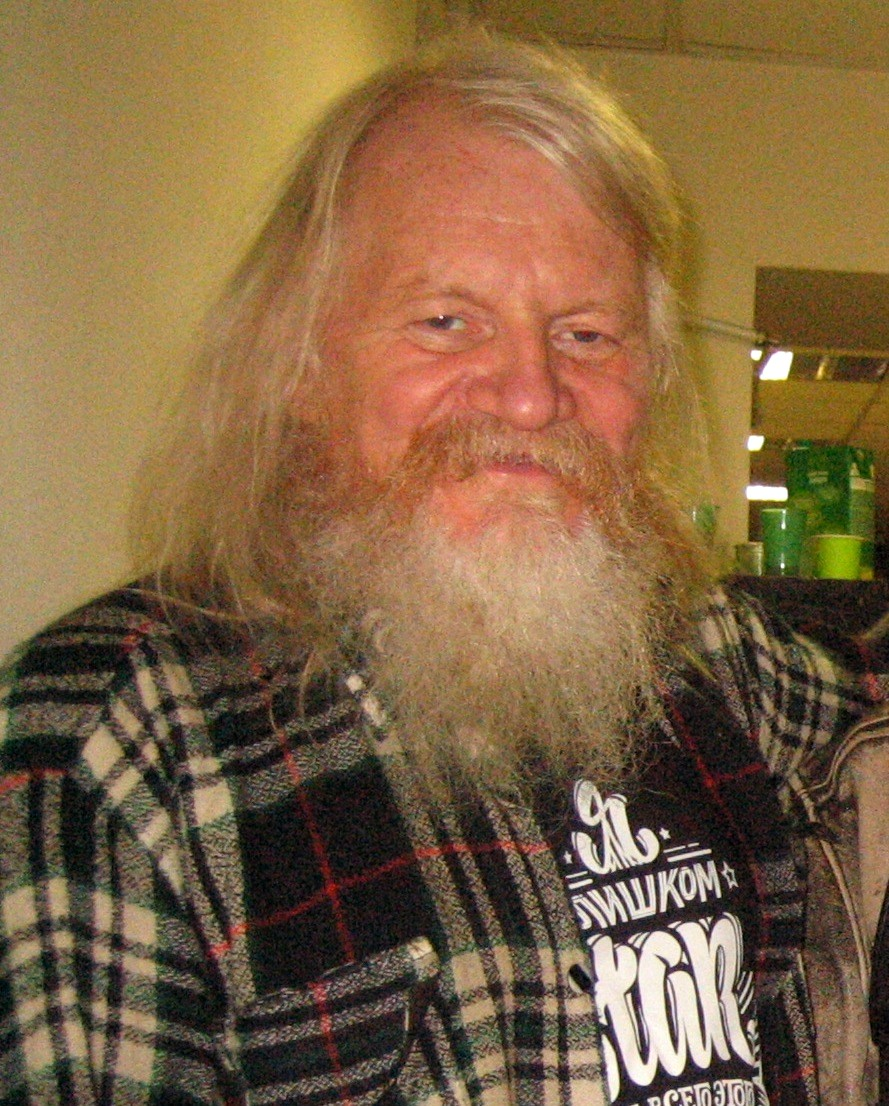

Background information
- Born: 1 July 1954 (age 70)
- Origin: Sverdlovsk, RSFSR
- Genres: Progressive rock, art rock, experimental rock, jazz fusion, instrumental rock, psychedelic rock
- Occupation(s): Musician, sound engineer, composer
- Instrument(s): Guitar, keyboards
- Years active: 1976–present
- Labels: R.A.I.G.
- Website: cosmusic.narod.ru

Aleksander Kostarev (Russian: Александр Владимирович Костарев) is a Russian progressive rock musician. He began his musical career in the 1970s, but did not garner popular recognition until the 2000s when he became one of the most important artists of the Russian progressive rock scene.

== Style ==
Trained as a guitarist, Kostarev primarily creates instrumental music. His musical genre is usually considered progressive rock, but it blends a mix of influences and styles, including art rock, psychedelic rock, jazz fusion, experimental rock and many more.

== Biography ==
Alexander Kostarev was born on July 1, 1954, in Novosibirsk.

The first band he played with was Perekrestok, a jazz-fusion ensemble which he formed in 1976 with a group of fellow students at the Ural University.

In 1986 Kostarev moved to Moscow and together with other musicians started a band called Alexander Kostarev's Quadraphonic Sound Theatre, which was soon renamed to KosMoBob (Alexander KOStarev-Ekaterina MOrozova-Roman BOBrovsky). At the same time, Kostarev worked with many Russian jazz and rock musicians as a session guitarist, one of them being Sergey Letov.

In 1995 KosMoBob changed its name to Dead Music, but soon returned to KosMoBob.

In the 2000s Kostarev started performing solo and gained popularity as one of the most important Russian progressive rock figures.

In 2003 the band KosMoBob decided to change its name to Kostarev's Group. In 2003 the Kostarev Group first album was released by Starless Records. The album was called Live@InProg 2003 and it was recorded during the band's performance at the InProg music festival in 2003.

In the years 2003-2005 Kostarev Group was a regular act at the InProg festival, which was the leading progressive rock festival in Russia in the 2000s and one of the most important festivals in the genre anywhere in the world.

In the year 2006 Alexander Kostarev received a special invitation to lead the Jam session that concluded the first day of the InProg 2006 festival. At the same year the Kostarev Group song "Who's Flying Over Me" appeared on the "Theme of Appreciation: A Worldwide Tribute to Eddie Jobson" compilation.

In 2006 Alexander Kostarev released a compilation called Kostarev. Works 1978-2006, which included selected recordings of Alexander Kostarev and different groups with whom he played over the period spanning from 1978 to 2006.

== Discography ==
- Kostarev Group. Live@InProg 2003 (Live album) (2003).
- Kostarev. Works 1978-2006 (compilation) (2006).
- Kostarev Group. KosMoBob: Vegetarian (2012 — CD, 2013 — LP).

== Trivia ==
- In 1987 the guitar-maker Yevgeniy Berezov created specifically for Alexander Kostarev a green extra-long guitar which has 29 frets on a 770 mm length scale tuned in the C# key. The name Alexander gave to it was "the green broomstick". It turns into a regular E-key-tuned guitar once a capo is placed at the third fret.
- Kostarev appeared six times in the InProg festival. Currently, it is the record for the biggest number of appearances in the InProg festival for one man/band.
