= Leningrad Rock Club =

Music venue in the Soviet Union (1981–1991)

Coordinates: 59.9296°N 30.3438°E

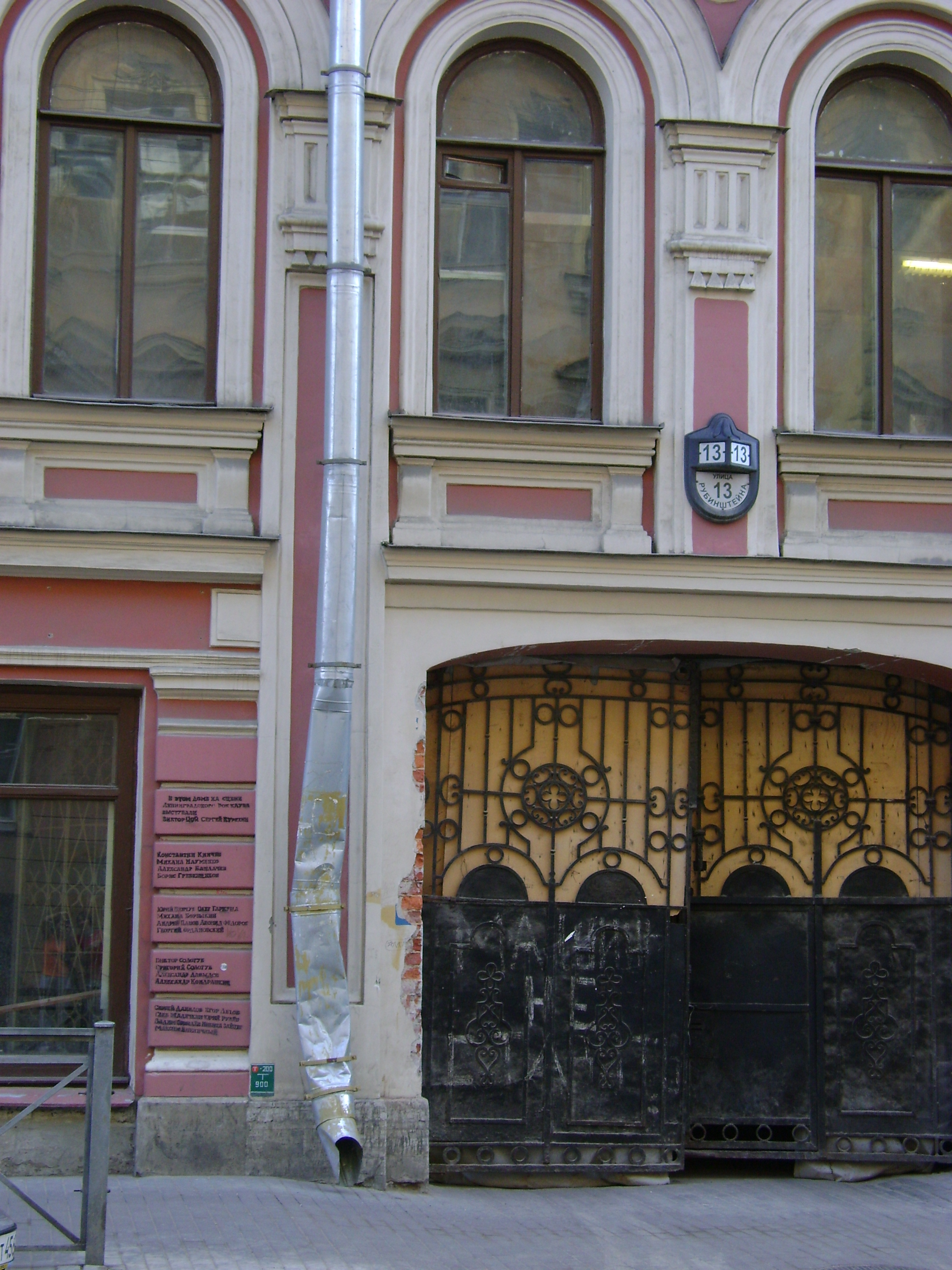
The building in 2009

The Leningrad Rock Club (Russian: Ленинградский рок-клуб) was a historic music venue of the 1980s in Leningrad, situated on Rubinstein Street in the city centre. Opened in 1981 and overseen by Komsomol and KGB, it became the first legal rock music venue in Leningrad. Overall, it was the largest rock scene in the Soviet Union and influenced the development of Russian rock.

The example of the Leningrad Rock Club once inspired enthusiasts in various cities and even villages of the country to create their own rock clubs (the most famous venues were Moscow Rock Laboratory, the Sverdlovsk Rock Club).

== History ==
Leningrad was a centre of rock music in the Soviet Union, perhaps due to its geographical proximity with Finland, which made it easier to access Western music. Attempts to create rock clubs began as early as 1973, but they were largely unsuccessful.

In March 7, 1981, the Leningrad Rock Club was formed in Leningrad Inter - Union House of Amateur Creativity house (LMDST). Association with trade unions that owned the LMDST, allowed to legally organize concerts and to avoid the attention of law enforcement agencies. The Regional Council of Trade Unions allocated 15 thousand rubles on the equipment. The club held seminars on rock aesthetics, rock poetry, and a rhythm studio.

It was intended to be organized similarly to the Union of Soviet Composers and censored lyrics and issued permits to perform in an effort to prevent the bands from making much that was too controversial. However, by providing musicians with a place to meet, perform, and discuss their music, the club provided for an unprecedented amount of creative freedom and helped lead to the Russian rock revolution. There were restrictions on which bands could perform at the club for most of its history, and groups had to audition before a commission. Membership card number one was issued to Beatles fan Kolya Vasin.

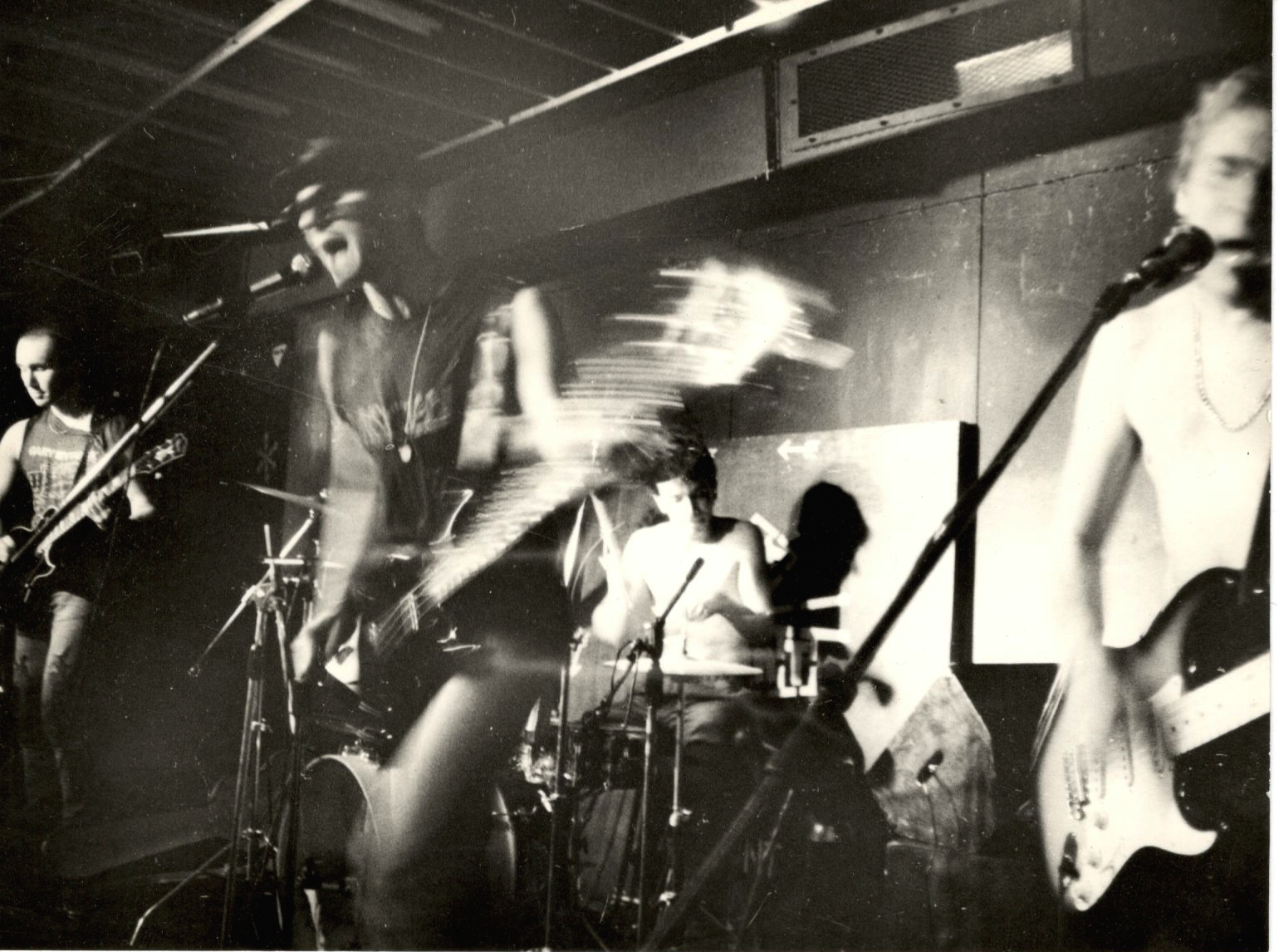
"Igry" performing. Late 1980s.

The Rock Club was engaged in concert and festival activities. At the festivals, Rock Club bands, by an unspoken rule, had to present a new program to the public and the jury. The first Rock Club festival happened in 1983, from then until the closure of the rock club, it was held annually. It was at that time that the rock club opened such groups as "Kino", "Alisa", "Televizor", "Pop-Mechanics", etc. Alexander Zhitinsky was a frequent guest of the festivals, who published notes in the "Aurora" magazine.

The club was monitored by the KGB, the Communist Party, and the Komsomol Communist Youth Organization. According to Zhitinsky and to Nikolay Mikhailov (a permanent president of LRC), KGB curators "did not create much pressure" (one of them even married the kurator of LMDST). Moreover, George Gunitsky noted that "rockers turned out to be a completely unpredictable audience. The KGB continued to dejectedly supervise the rock club, but this gave good indicators only for reports". In the mid and late 1980s, administrative control over the LRC began to decline, and those groups that previously simply could not be admitted there due to ideological doubt were accepted into the club - "Avtomaticheskie udovletvoriteli", "Yugo-Zapad" etc.

In 1988, The Scorpions performed at the Leningrad Rock Club.

In 1989-1991, the Rock Club managed to hold two major promotions. In 1989, the LRC took part in the international movement "Next-stop Rock and Roll", which aimed to bring together the Soviet youth and the youth of Denmark, Sweden, Norway, Greenland and Iceland; a double live album "Laika" was released with the participation of Soviet and Danish bands. In 1991, a LRC 10th anniversary festival was held.

The club effectively closed in 1991.

== Influence ==
The Leningrad Rock Club provided access to a new, Western form of music for an audience of unprecedented size in the Soviet Union. It led to an emergence of a rock industry in the Soviet Union. Its performers began to tour, perform on television, and have their songs played on the radio. This was part of a growing prominence of Western culture in the Soviet Union.

However, some musicians disliked the mainstream fame and acceptance the Leningrad Rock Club brought them. "We are so official now, so taken to heart, that the people who were with us before are not sure of us," Boris Grebenshchikov of Aquarium said in an interview with The New York Times. "Nobody can believe that the system has changed. They think we must have changed." The Leningrad Rock Club was viewed by some artists as a sign of compliance with the Soviet government. Alexander Gradsky, a Russian composer, multi-instrumentalist and one of the earliest performers of rock music in Russia, commented on this position in 1989 in "Rumba" magazine:

There are, say, a hundred musicians. Some play better, some play worse. Over time, the one who plays better becomes getting paid for his art, because he has become popular and people want to see him. And then he is considered as "sold out" by those who play worse. It's as old as the world itself. And the usual speculation that I am, they say, an unrecognized genius ends when, for example, "Nautilus Pompilius" began to get seven thousand [rubles] for the concert. So, it turns out, the Nautilus was sold out to them...

Televizor, Kino, Alisa, Aquarium, Zoopark, Piknik, Automatic Satisfiers, DDT, NEP, and Grazhdanskaya Oborona (formally) were among the groups associated with the Leningrad Rock Club.

== Criticism ==
I communicate with people from the rock culture of that time, they deserve respect. But when [western] rock music started leaking to us, people wanted to do whatever it was. They didn't want anything Soviet, they didn't watch TV, they considered it ghoulish. And now time has passed and dropped all the shit. And if a modern person puts Polad Bülbüloğlu's track and compares it with the best representatives of the Leningrad rock club, he will say: "Guys, you should have listened to what was then." We've had too much of a fight with an invisible enemy. —Dmitryi Naumov, "Birtman"
