= Televizor =

Russian rock group

Televizor Телевизор
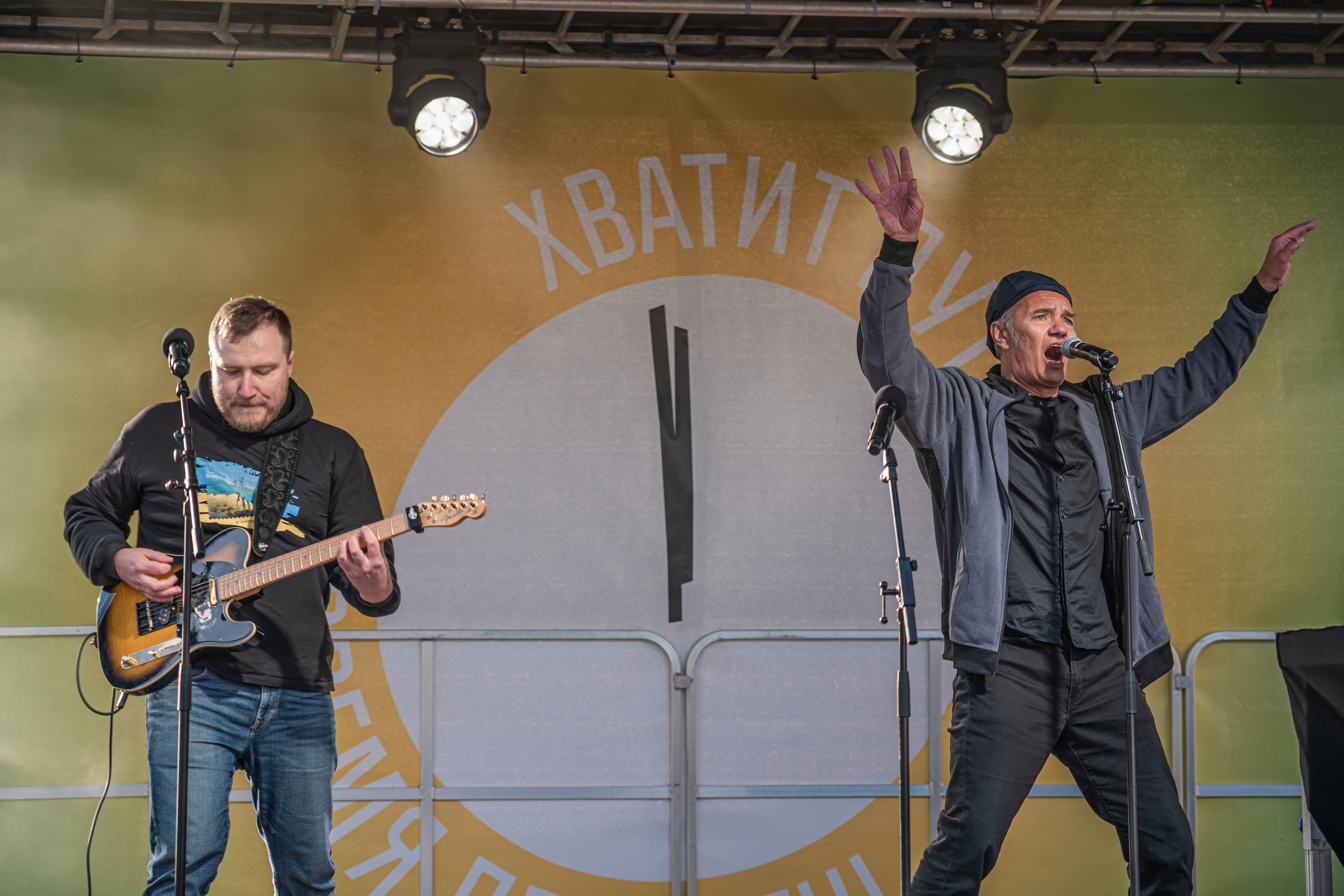

Background information
- Origin: St. Petersburg, Russia
- Genres: Dark wave Gothic rock Industrial rock Techno; Funk rock Synthpop
- Years active: 1984–present
- Members: Mikhail Borzykin; Sergey Sivickiy; Sergey Rusanov
- Website: televizor.band

Televizor (Russian: Телевизор, "Television set") is a Soviet/Russian gothic rock/industrial group formed in 1984 in Saint-Petersburg. Mikhail Borzykin is the lead singer and founder of group. They began to perform at the Leningrad Rock Club. They are noted for their strong views against authoritarianism in Russian politics, and have repeatedly denounced the actions of Vladimir Putin in their lyrics. At the time the group first formed, it was one of comparatively few political rock bands in Soviet Union. Televizor's songs were selected for the Legends of Russian Rock collection.

== History ==
The band got its start in the 1984, in Leningrad, and is considered part of the Leningrad Rock Club. Their 1987 album Otechestvo Illyuziy (Russian: Отечество иллюзий) is among the best albums in the history of Russian rock.

"Your Papa Is a Fascist" is one of their most famous songs.

Mikhail's songs and the Televizor music are influenced by Talking Heads, The Cure, Cocteau Twins, The Beatles, Depeche Mode, The Smiths, philosophers Arthur Schopenhauer and Friedrich Nietzsche, as well as writers: Arkady and Boris Strugatsky, Mikhail Bulgakov and Hermann Hesse.

On 13 May 2015, they performed the song "Ty prosti nas, Ukraina" (Russian: Ты прости нас, Украина, lit. 'Forgive us, Ukraine') at the Atlas nightclub in Kyiv. The song expresses the group's position towards the conflict between Ukraine and Russia, containing criticism of Vladimir Putin and mentioning the Heavenly Hundred.

== Discography ==
=== Studio albums ===
- 1985 Шествие рыб
- 1987 Отечество иллюзий
- 1989 Отчуждение
- 1990 Мечта самоубийцы
- 1992 Дым-туман
- 1995 Двое
- 2001 Путь к успеху
- 2004 МегаМизантроп
- 2005 Отчуждение-2005
- 2009 Дежавю
- 2016 Ихтиозавр

=== Live albums ===
- 1984 II фестиваль Ленинградского рок-клуба
- 1985 III фестиваль Ленинградского рок-клуба
- 1987 Музыка для мёртвых
- 1990 Концерт в Амстердаме
- 1994 Живой
- 2002 Перекрёсток
- 2010 XXV лет в одной лодке

== Members ==
- Mikhail Borzykin – singing, keyboards, synthesizer, programming
- Sergey Sivickiy – guitar
- Sergey Rusanov – drum kit
