= Free Knowledge Award =

Wikimedia RU Award

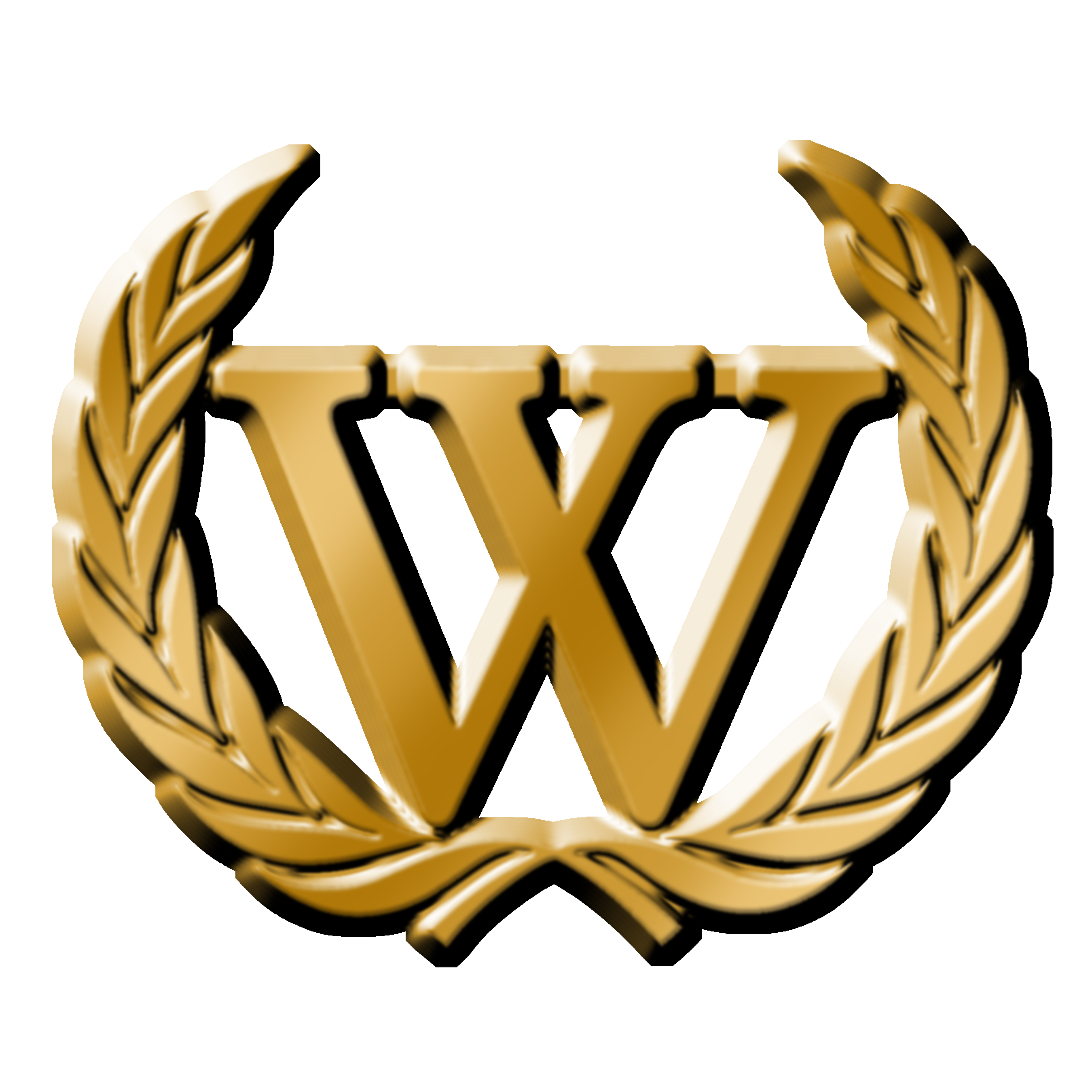

Free Knowledge Award was an award presented by Wikimedia RU, a Russian nonprofit organization dedicated to promoting encyclopedic knowledge. The prize was awarded to individuals or organizations who are not active participants in Wikimedia Foundation projects, but who have made a notable contribution to the goals of the Wikimedia movement: the dissemination of free knowledge. It has been awarded annually since 2014.

The Free Knowledge Award winners were determined in two stages. First, the wiki community nominated candidates and voted, which resulted in a short list. From this list, Wikimedia RU members selected 3-4 winners, taking into account the arguments presented. The winners were announced directly at the ceremony.

== Winners ==
№	Years	Winners
1	2014	Ivan Zassoursky; Internet Users Association; Ushinsky State Pedagogical Library; Association of Honorary Citizens, Mentors and Talented Youth
2	2015	CyberLeninka; Homeland heroes Business Journal
3	2016	Oral History (foundation); National Electronic Library; Yuri Metelkin
4	2017	Old Books Project; Клопс.Ru; Andrei Galinichev and Dmitry Poslavsky
5	2018	Digital Herbarium of Moscow University; Russian OpenStreetMap community Kirill Vasiliev
6	2019	Free webinars "Direct-Academy" platform Aleksey Ryabinin; Nekrasov Central Library
7	2020	News agency Bashinform; Youth movement Selet; Leonid Shafirov
8	2021	Vadim Riabitsev and Nina Sadykova; Alexei Sidelnikov and Mikhail Trenikhin; Dmitry Lyovochkin; Atlas of New Professions project team
9	2022	Olesya Nosova; Anatoly Gulyaev and Evgeny Raevsky; Andrei Kuznetsov
	2023	It was not conducted
