= Transactions of the Krylov State Research Center =

- Discipline: Engineering, Shipbuilding
- Language: English, Russian
- Edited by: Valeriy Polovinkin

Publication details
- History: Soviet Union (1941–1991); Russia (1991–present)
- Publisher: Krylov Center
- Frequency: 4 issues/year

Standard abbreviations
- ISO 4: Trans. Krylov State Res. Cent.

Indexing
- ISSN: 2542-2324 (print); 2618-8244 (web)

Links
- Journal homepage

The Transactions of the Krylov State Research Center (sometimes spelled Transactions of the Krylov State Research Centre) is a Russian periodical scientific peer-reviewed journal in the field of shipbuilding. It presents articles about research projects dedicated to the shipbuilding industry. Various universities, research institutes, design companies as well as Krylov Center contribute to the journal.

== History ==
The journal was established in 1941. The founder and the first editor-in-chief was Rear Admiral Viktor Pershin. In his first editorial this famous shipbuilding engineer said that the purpose of the publication is to popularize scientific research work and apply its results to the shipbuilding industry. The publication was suspended during World War II, but was resumed immediately after the end of the war in 1945.

== Main topics ==
- Naval Architecture
- Ship Design and Structure
- Ship Powering Engines and Electric Generation Systems
- Ship Signatures
- Miscellaneous

== Abstracting and indexing ==
The articles have been indexed in the largest international database Web of Science since 2018.

The journal is also abstracted and indexed in EBSCO Publishing, WorldCat, VINITI, CyberLeninka, Russian State Library, Russian National Public Library for Science and Technology.
