= Project 23470 tugboat =

Russian tug boat class

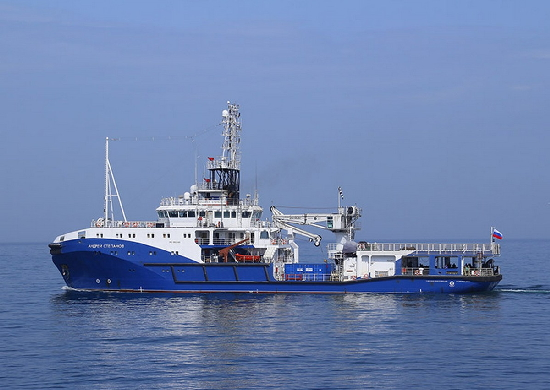
- Andrey Stepanov in 2020

Class overview
- Name: Project 23470
- Builders: Yaroslavl Shipyard
- Operators: Russian Navy
- Built: 2014–present
- In commission: 2020–present
- Planned: 6
- Building: 2
- Completed: 5
- Active: 4

General characteristics
- Type: Tugboat
- Displacement: 2,656 tons (standard load); 3,401.5 tons (full load)
- Length: 69.75 m (228.8 ft)
- Beam: 15 m (49 ft)
- Draught: 5.11 m (16.8 ft)
- Propulsion: 3 x 2850 kW diesel-generators; 2 x azipods; 2 x bow thrusters
- Speed: 14 kn (26 km/h; 16 mph)
- Range: 3,000 nmi (5,600 km; 3,500 mi)
- Endurance: 30 days
- Capacity: 300 tons
- Complement: 33
- Aviation facilities: 1 x helipad

Project 23470 is a series of seagoing tugboats developed by the Baltsudoproekt Central Design Bureau, department of the Krylov state research center, chief designer is Mikhail Rudenko, being built for the Russian Navy, intended to perform a variety of tasks including towing vessels, escorting vessels, extinguishing fires, and refloating vessels.

== Ships ==
Name	Builder	Laid down	Launched	Commissioned	Fleet	Status
Sergey Balk	Yaroslavl Shipyard	30 October 2014	27 December 2016	21 February 2020	Black Sea Fleet	Active
Andrey Stepanov	Yaroslavl Shipyard	23 July 2015	29 June 2017	June 2020	Pacific Fleet	Active as of 2026
Kapitan Nayden	Yaroslavl Shipyard	9 November 2016	28 November 2019	21 August 2022	Black Sea Fleet	Active
Kapitan Sergeev	Yaroslavl Shipyard	2016	14 May 2021	3 July 2026	Pacific Fleet	Active
Kapitan Ushakov	Yaroslavl Shipyard		14 June 2022			Launched Capsized while fitting out in August 2025; salvage effort reported underway as of June 2026
Kontr-admiral Pinchuk	Yaroslavl Shipyard					Laid down
Vladimir Kovalev	Yaroslavl Shipyard	2 September 2024				Laid down

== See also ==
- List of active Russian Navy ships
- Future of the Russian Navy
