= List of archives in Russia =

This is a list of archives in Russia.

== Archives in Russia ==
=== Federal archives ===
- State Archive of the Russian Federation (ГАРФ). Location: Moscow.
- Russian State Archive of Ancient Documents (РГАДА). Location: Moscow. Until 1992 known as the Central State Archive of Ancient Documents of the USSR (ЦГАДА СССР).
- Russian State Historical Archive (РГИА). Location: Saint Petersburg.
- Russian State Archive of Contemporary History (РГАНИ)
- Russian State Archive of Socio-Political History (РГАСПИ)
- Russian State Military Archive (РГВА). Location: Moscow.
- Russian State Military Historical Archive (РГВИА)
- Russian State Archive of the Navy (РГА ВМФ)
- Russian State Archive of Literature and Art (РГАЛИ). Location: Moscow.
- Russian State Archive of Scientific-Technical Documentation (РГАНТД). Location: Moscow (since 1995).
- Russian State Archive in Samara (РГА в г. Самаре). Was a branch of the Russian State Archive of Scientific-Technical Documentation from 1995-2016.
- Russian State Archive of Film and Photo Documents (РГАКФД)
- Russian State Archive of Sound Recordings (РГАФД)
- Russian State Archive of the Economy (РГАЭ). Location: Moscow.
- Russian State Historical Archive of the Far East (РГИА ДВ)

=== Federal departmental archives ===
- Central Archive of the Ministry of Defence of the Russian Federation (ЦАМО)
- Archive of Military-Medical Documents at the Military-Medical Museum of the Ministry of Defense Russian Federation
- Central Naval Archive of the Ministry of Defence of the Russian Federation (ЦВМА)
- Branch of the Central Naval Archive of the Ministry of Defence of the Russian Federation
- Central Border Archive of the Federal Security Service of Russia (ЦПА ФСБ России)
- Central Archive of the Federal Security Service of Russia (ЦА ФСБ)
- Main Information Center of the Ministry of Internal Affairs of Russia (ГИЦ МВД)
- Central Archive of the Internal Troops of the Ministry of Internal Affairs of Russia (ЦАВВ)
- Archive of the President of the Russian Federation

=== Regional archives ===
- National Archive of the Republic of Adygea
- State Archive of Socio-Legal Documentation of the Republic of Altai
- Central State Archive of Public Associations of the Republic of Bashkortostan (ЦГАОО РБ)
- Central State Historical Archive of the Republic of Bashkortostan (ЦГИА РБ)
- State Archive of the Republic of Buryatia (ГАУК РБ «ГАРБ»)
- Central State Archive of the Republic of Dagestan (ЦГА РД)
- State Archive of the Republic of Ingushetia (ГКУ «Госархив Ингушетии»)
- Archive Service of the Kabardino-Balkarian Republic (АС КБР)
- Budgetary Institution of the Republic of Kalmykia "National Archive"
- State Archive of the Karachay-Cherkess Republic (РГБУ «ГА КЧР»). Location: Cherkessk. Divisions:
  - Personnel Records Archive (Архив документов по личному составу)
  - Center for Documentation of Modern History (ФРГБУ «ГА КЧР» ЦДНИ). Location: Cherkessk.
- Center for Documentation of Public Movements and Parties of the Karachay-Cherkess Republic. (РРГУ «ЦДОДП КЧР» ) Location: Cherkessk.
- National Archive of the Republic of Karelia (ГБУ НА РК)
- Komi National Archive
- State Archive of the Republic of Crimea (ГКУ РК ГА РК) Formerly State Archives in the Autonomous Republic of Crimea
- State Archive of the Republic of Crimea for Modern History and Personnel Records (ГКУ ГА РК Ни и ЛС)
- State Archive of the Republic of Mari El
- Central State Archive of the Republic of Mordovia
- State Archive of Personnel Records of the Republic of Mordovia
- National Archive of the Republic of Sakha (Yakutia)
- Central State Archive of the Republic of North Ossetia–Alania (РГБУ «ЦГА РСО-Алания»)
- State Archive of Modern History of the Republic of North Ossetia–Alania (РГБУ «ГАНИ РСО-Алания»)
- State Archive of the Republic of Tatarstan (ГБУ «ГА РТ»)
- National Archive of the Republic of Tuva (ГБУ НА РТ)
- Central State Archive of the Udmurt Republic (ГУ «ЦГА УР»)
- Center for Documentation of Modern History of the Udmurt Republic (ГУ «ЦДНИ УР»)
- State Archive of Social and Legal Documents of the Udmurt Republic (ГУ «ГАСПД УР»)
- National Archive of Khakassia
- Administration for Supporting the Activities of the Archival Directorate of the Government of the Chechen Republic
- State Historical Archive of the Chuvash Republic
- State Archive of Contemporary History of the Chuvash Republic
- State Film Studio "Chuvashkino" and Archive of Electronic Documentation
- State Historical Archive of Sakhalin Oblast (ГБУ «ГИАСО»)
- State Archive of Personnel Records of Sakhalin Oblast (ГБУ «ГАДЛССО»)
- State Archive of Kostroma Oblast. Location: Kostroma.
- State Archive of Contemporary History of Kostroma Oblast (ГУ «ГАНИКО»)
- State Archive of Krasnodar Krai
- State Archive of Krasnoyarsk Krai
- State Archive of the Republic of Crimea (ГКУ РК «Госархив Республики Крым»)
- Leningrad Regional State Archive in Vyborg (ГКУ «ЛОГАВ»). Location: Vyborg.
- State Archive of Murmansk Oblast (ГАМО)
- State Archive of Murmansk Oblast in Kirovsk (ГОКУ ГАМО в г. Кировске). Location: Kirovsk, Murmansk Oblast.
- State Archive of Penza Oblast (ГБУ «ГАПО»)
- State Archive of Perm Krai (ГКБУ ГАПК)
- Perm State Archive of Contemporary History (ПермГАНИ)
- State Archive of Rostov Oblast (ГАРО)
- State Archive of Ryazan Oblast (ГБУ РО «ГАРО»)
- State Archive of Stavropol Krai (ГАСК)
- United State Archive of Orenburg Oblast (ОГАОО)
- United State Archive of Chelyabinsk Oblast (ОГАЧО)
- Central Archive of the City of Moscow
- Central Historical Archive of Moscow (ЦИАМ)
- Central Archive of the Socio-Political History of Moscow
- Central Moscow Archive-Museum of Personal Collections
- Central Archive of Scientific and Technical Documentation of Moscow (ЦАНТДМ)
- Central Archive of Electronic and Audiovisual Documents of Moscow
- Central Archive of Documents on the Employment History of Moscow Citizens
- State Archive of Novosibirsk Oblast
- State Archive of Oryol Oblast
- Central State Archive of St. Petersburg (ЦГА СПб)
- Central State Historical Archive of St. Petersburg (ЦГИА СПб)
- Central State Archive of Literature and Art of St. Petersburg (ЦГАЛИ СПб)
- Central State Archive of Film, Photo, and Audio-Visual Documents of St. Petersburg (ЦГАКФФД СПб)
- Central State Archive of Scientific and Technical Documentation of St. Petersburg (ЦГАНТД СПб)
- Central State Archive of Historical and Political Documents of St. Petersburg (ЦГАИПД СПб)
- Central State Archive of Personnel Records of Liquidated State Enterprises of St. Petersburg (ЦГАЛС СПб)
- State Archive of Saratov Oblast (ОГУ «ГАСО»)
- State Archive of Sverdlovsk Oblast (ГКУСО «ГАСО») Location: Yekaterinburg.
- Central State Archive of Moscow Oblast (ЦГАМО)
- State Archive of Tambov Oblast (ГАТО)
- State Archive of Socio-Political History of Tambov Oblast (ГАСПИТО)
- State Archive of Tomsk Oblast (ГАТО)
- State Archive of Yaroslavl Oblast
- State Archive of Contemporary History of Novgorod Oblast (ГОКУ ГАНИНО)
- State Archive of Yugra
- State Archive of Tver Oblast (ГКУ ГАТО)
- State archive of Kaliningrad oblast. Location: Kaliningrad.
- State Archive of Primorsky Krai (ГАПК). Location: Vladivostok.

=== Municipal archives ===
- State Archive of the City of Ishimbay
- Kaliningrad city archive

== Archives outside Russia with extensive Russian collections ==
- Bakhmeteff Archive of Russian and East European Culture at Columbia University, New York City, United States
- Russian Historical Archive Abroad in Prague
- Hoover Institution Library and Archives

== See also ==
- List of archives
- List of libraries in Russia
- List of museums in Russia
- Culture of Russia
