= Don State Public Library =

Public library in Rostov-on-Don, Russia

Coordinates: 47°13′41.36″N 39°43′35.63″E

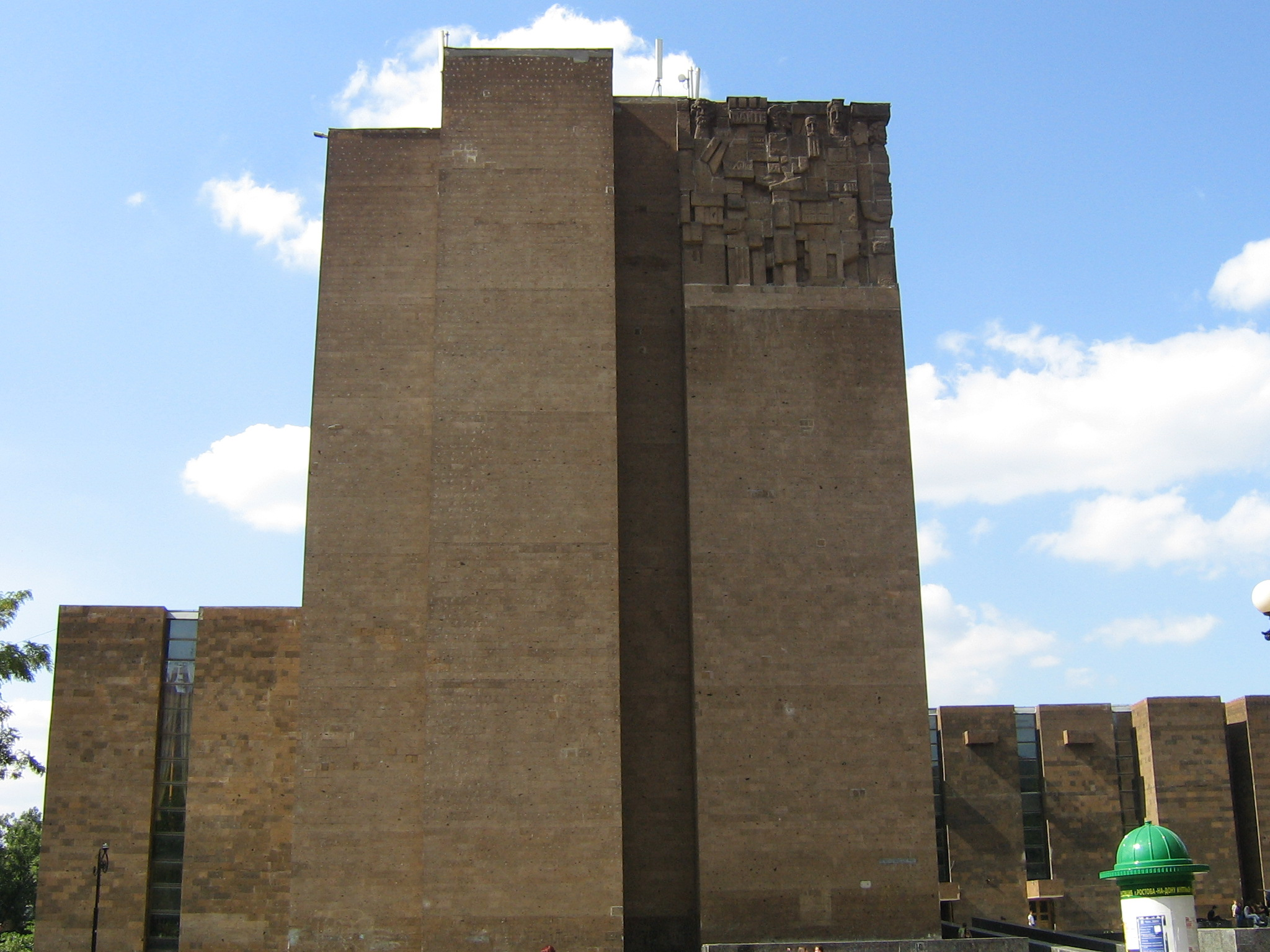
- Location: Rostov-on-Don, Russia
- Established: 7 January 1886; 140 years ago

Collection

Other information
- Website: http://dspl.ru/

Don State Public Library (Russian: Донская государственная публичная библиотека) is the main public library of Rostov Oblast, and is situated in the city of Rostov-on-Don. It was established in 1886 and is the oldest library in Southern Russia. In the Soviet period it was known as the Karl Marx Rostov-on-Don State Scientific Library (Russian: Ростовская государственная научная библиотека имени К. Маркса). It is an important cultural center of the city, hosting numerous art festivals and exhibitions.

== History ==
Rostov-on-Don Public Library, the first major library in the city, was opened on 7 January 1886. The new library consisted of 3,000 books, purchased by the city administration from a private library for the sum of 5,000 rubles. Until 1894, the library was housed in various private houses on Bolshaya Sadovaya Street. From 1921 to 1994 the library was located in Velikanova House on Serafimovich Street.

In 1974, the construction of a new library building on Pushkinskaya Street began. It was designed by architect Yan Zanis and engineer Boris Sidelkovsky. The construction was severely delayed over the next 20 years and was finished only in 1994. On 25 May 1994 the library moved into its new premises. Three months later, in September, the library invited Russian writer Alexander Solzhenitsyn to visit and meet readers.

In May 2010, Don State Public Library hosted a conference of Russian Wikipedians.

== See also ==
- List of libraries in Russia
