= Kursk State University =

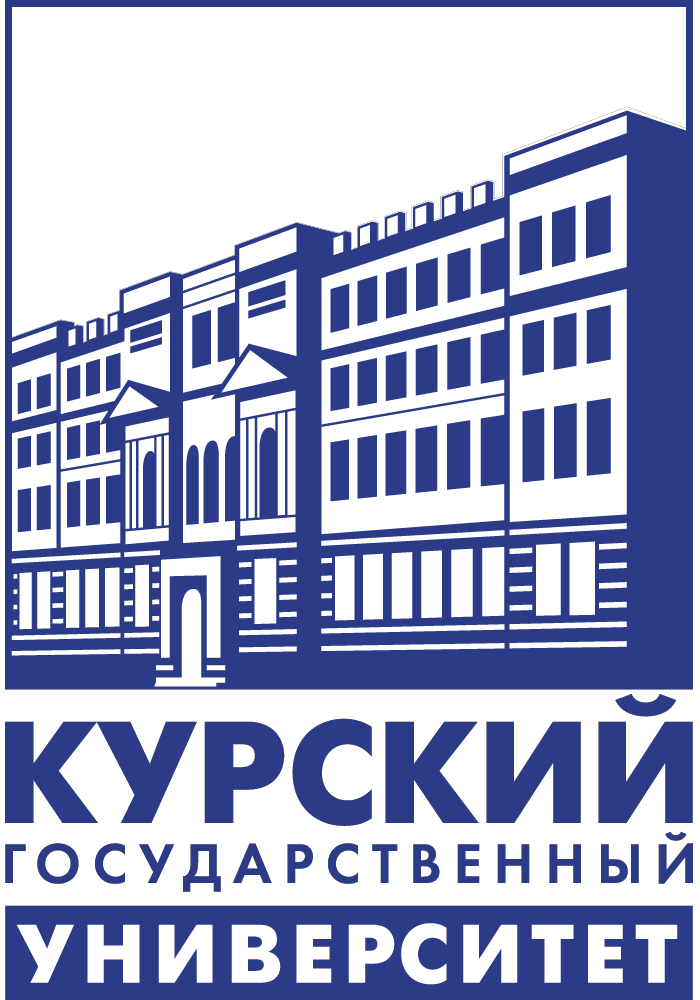
- Курский государственный университет
- Established: 1934
- Rector: Vyacheslav V. Gvozdev
- Administrative staff: approx. 900
- Students: approx. 10,000
- Location: Kursk, Russia
- Campus: Urban
- Website: http://www.kursk-uni.ru Building details
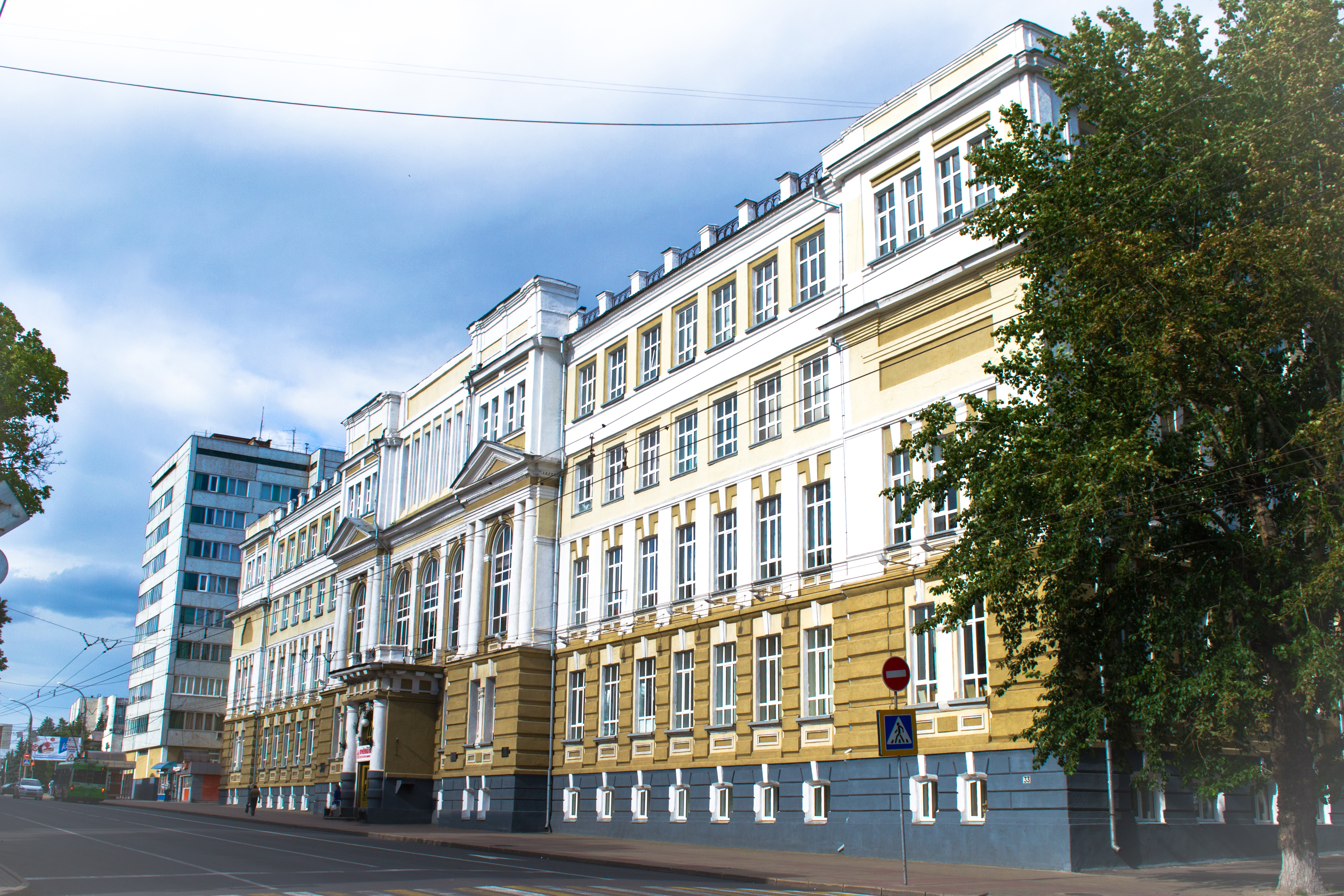

Kursk State University (Russian Курский государственный университет) is Kursk's oldest higher educational institution, founded in 1934 as Kursk State Pedagogical Institute, later in 1994 transformed into Kursk State Pedagogical University and has a current status since 2003.

== University today ==
Today, the university is a science and education center offering modern educational technologies and various forms of vocational training within 99 licensed specialties of higher education (specialist, bachelor and master programmes) as well as PhD programmes in 38 areas of specialisation. The staff of about 900 tutors and researchers in the 67 university departments includes 93 faculty members possess full doctorate degrees.

Kursk State University operates six education buildings, over 100 natural science labs with a variety of high-tech equipment, nearly 50 specialised study rooms for the humanities, an astronomical observatory, ten multimedia classrooms, a conference hall, a TV-centre, industrial training facilities, art studios, a library and reading halls, zoological, mineralogical and archeological museums, a biological and agricultural testing centre, gymnasiums and other facilities.

== History ==
In 1794, a boarding house for noble maidens was opened in Kursk Governorate (in accordance with the reform of Catherine II).

In 1871, it became the Mariinsky Girls' Gymnasium.

After the revolution of 1917, it was transformed into the Kursk Teachers' (later Pedagogical) Institute.

In 1934, the Kursk State Pedagogical Institute was established (the first higher educational institution in Kursk).

In 1994, the Kursk State Pedagogical Institute became a university, but still a pedagogical one.

== Faculties ==
1. Physics and Mathematics
2. Natural Sciences and Geography
3. Computer Sciences
4. Philology
5. Foreign Languages
6. History
7. Economics and Management
8. Law
9. Pedagogics and Psychology
10. Industrial Education
11. Special Needs Education
12. Philosophy, Social and Cultural Studies
13. Theology and Religious Studies
14. Fine Arts
15. ArtsЫДтИ
16. Physical Training and Sport
17. Professional Retraining
18. Preparatory Studies
19. Actual Applied Specialties

== See also ==
- Kursk State University Library
