= Russian State Children's Library =

Library in Moscow, Russia

- Российская государственная детская библиотека
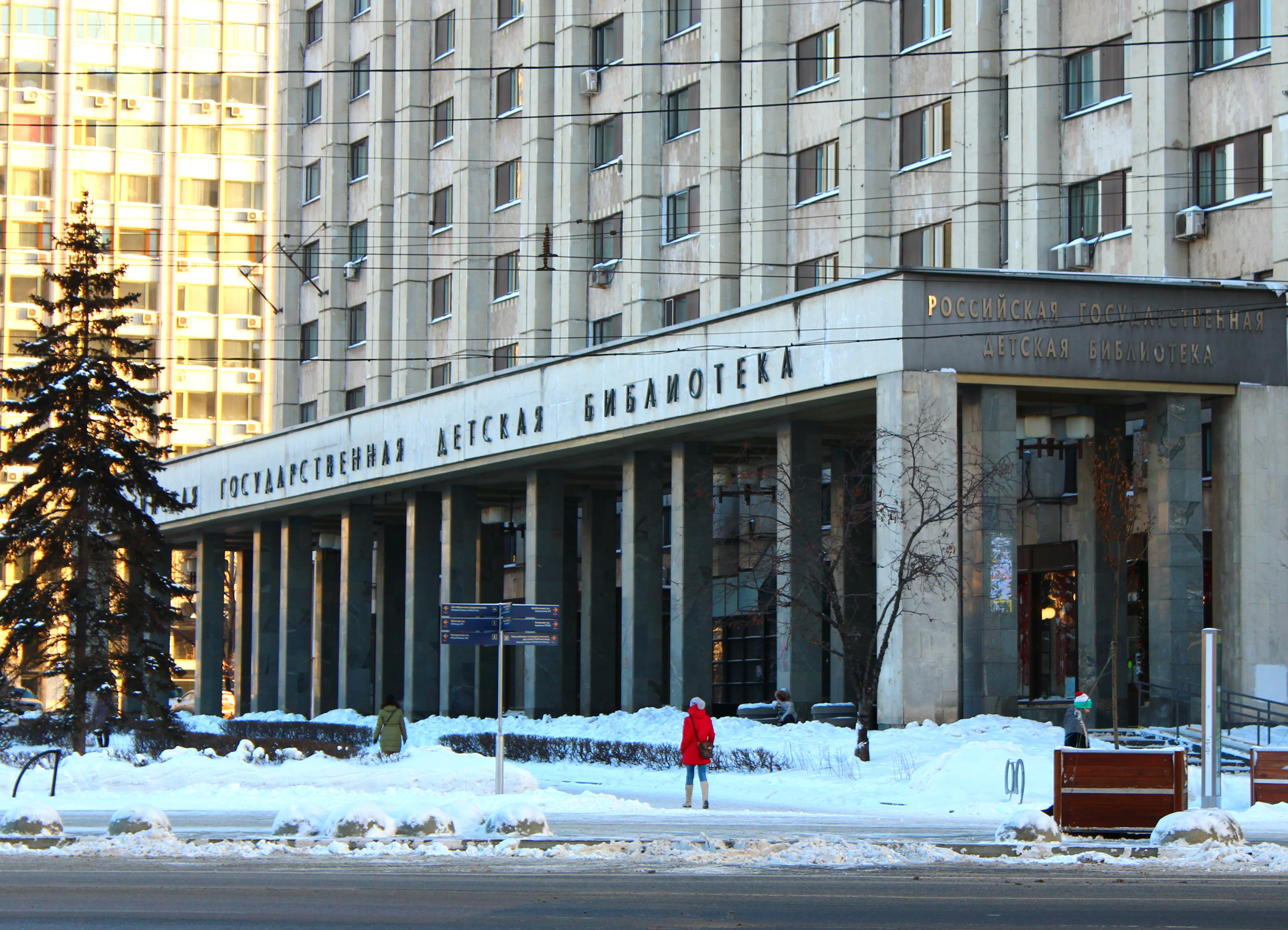
- 55°43′43″N 37°36′46″E
- Location: Moscow, Russia
- Type: Children's Library
- Established: 1969

Other information
- Director: Mariya Vedenyapina
- Website: https://rgdb.ru/

The Russian State Children's Library, also called the RGDB, is the world's largest Children's library, located in the Russian capital of Moscow. The library receives 45,000 visitors a year and 1.2 million online visitors annually. As of 2019, the Russian State Children's Library has over 560,000 books in its collection, in addition to other materials.

== History ==
The building was established in December 1969, celebrating its 50th anniversary in 2019. Vladimir Putin congratulated the library's anniversary. The Library runs a cultural exchange project called Hello, Neighbour! that seeks to introduce Russians to other cultures. In 2019, the Emirati Kalimat Foundation for Children's Empowerment donated large numbers of Arabic children's books to the library as part of a cultural exchange program with Arabs, and in 2020, the library hosted an online "Fabulous Azerbaijan" initiative about Azerbaijani culture and traditions. The RGDB held a "Draw Egypt" contest in October 2020 in which Russian children submitted drawings of what they thought Egypt must be like.

Russian president Vladimir Putin and First Lady of the United States Laura Bush visited the library together in 2002.

== See also ==
- List of libraries in Russia
