= National Electronic Library =

Service provided by the Russian government

National electronic library
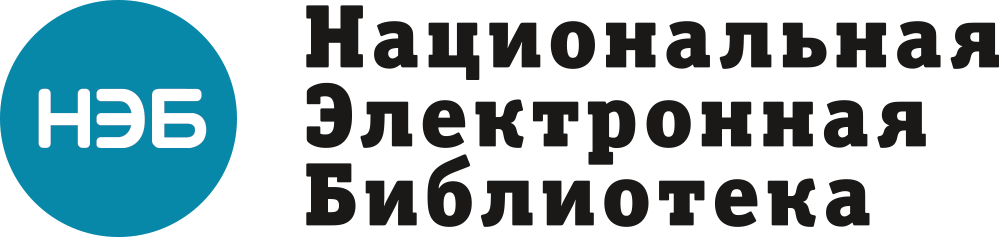
- Screenshot
- Website type: Digital library
- Owner: Ministry for Culture of Russia
- Website: rusneb.ru
- Launched: 2004; 22 years ago
- Current status: Active

The National Electronic Library (NEL) is a website funded by the Ministry of Culture of the Russian Federation, which provides Internet users with access to digitized books, newspapers, and magazines in Russian libraries, museums, and archives. It is operated by the Russian State Library located in Moscow. In November 2024, the library reported that it had 5,752,597 electronic documents in its collection, of those;94.0% were available under Open Access terms. The library continues growing its historic collection by scanning additional materials, converting them into text using optical character recognition, and storing them in its digital database, capable of full-text search. The site has a mobile application for iOS and Android.

== History ==
After becoming independent Russia inherited Russian State Library in Moscow, National Library of Russia in St. Petersburg, as well as several other libraries of national significance. With the advent of the Digital Age the idea of a national electronic library was brought up on several occasions. But it was only in 2003, when developments in database architecture as well as in the internet infrastructure, allowed for a practical implementation of this idea in Russia.

In 2003, the project was initiated by the two largest libraries in the country: Russian National Library (RNL) in Saint Petersburg and the Russian State Library (RSL) in Moscow. The libraries approached the Ministry of Culture of Russia with an initiative to create a nation-wide electronic library. In 2004, the personnel of the two aforementioned libraries started joint development of this library. The main purpose of the National Electronic Library was to collect, archive and describe electronic documents, that contribute to the preservation and development of national science and culture, as well as making sure that such documents are accessible to the public. The project was formally announced on December 17, 2008.

In 2012, the Ministry of Culture of the Russian Federation included the development of the NEB as a state system in the federal target program “Culture of Russia ( 2012—2018)». Since 2013, the Ministry of Culture has begun developing the project, allocating funding for the creation of a technological platform, the purchase of copyrights, and the digitization of printed books.

In 2016 the project received Free Knowledge Award from Wikipedia.

In February 2019, the Russian Government approved the Regulation on the Federal State Information System "National Electronic Library". The directive requires mandatory deposit of electronic copies of all works published in Russia.

== Development of supporting software and data entry ==
The first stage of project was sponsored by the Russian State Library, that announced an invitation to tender for potential developers at a cost of 12 mln. roubles (ca. US$462,000). The project was completed jointly by two Russian companies: CROC and ЕМС. The hardware was purchased from Hewlett-Packard. Document viewing software was procured from DefView.

== Use statistics ==
book rentals	reading views				
book rentals	total	Russian State Library	Russian State Library-on line	Other libraries	Opened to everyone
2012	1,968,405	320,764	742,977	116,390	788,274
2013	3,186,695	328,475	716,666	201,115	1,940,439
2014	3,506,507	283,502	550,208	193,782	2,479,015
2015	9,478,349	183,128	369,227	147,239	8,810,478

== Criticism ==
The project has been criticized for the lack of well-defined goals, restricted access to copyrighted materials, purchase of numerous books, that have little demand from the users, poor library profile in global search engines, missing deadlines by its developers, and their overall underperformance.

== See also ==
- List of digital library projects
- Google Books
- List of libraries in Russia
