= Velikanova House =

Mansion and architectural monument in Rostov-on-Don, Russia

Coordinates: 47.1302°N 39.4206°E

- Особняк Великановой
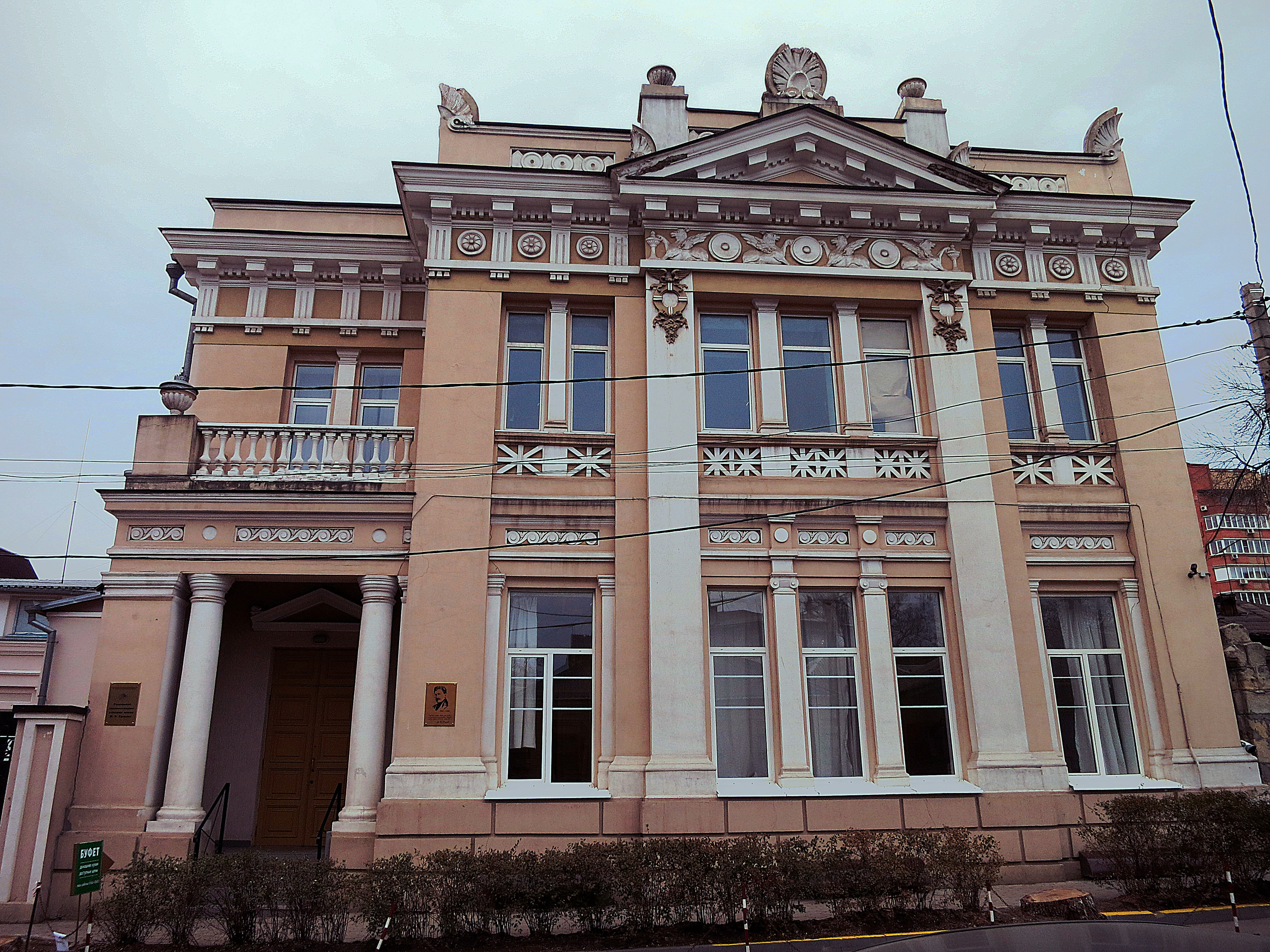
- Established: 1890
- Location: Rostov-on-Don, Rostov Oblast, Russia.
- Type: Mansion

Velikanova House (Russian: Особняк Великановой) is a mansion and an architectural monument in the city of Rostov-on-Don, Russia. It was built in 1884–1890 on the project of architects Nikolay Doroshenko and Nikolay Sokolov. Today the building is occupied by Rostov Art College named after M.B. Grekov.

== Description ==
In 1884–1890 Rostov-on-Don merchant Semyon Ivanovich Velikanov had a mansion built for his daughter Pelageya on Kazanskaya Street (now Serafimovich Street). There she lived with her husband, Matvei Kirillovich Kozlov, who was a speaker of Rostov-on-Don City Duma and a mining engineer. The mansion had 28 rooms, several cellars and a fountain in the courtyard. The facades of the building were decorated in Neoclassical style.

In 1921 the mansion was nationalized and Karl Marx Rostov-on-Don State Library (now Don State Public Library) was opened there.

In 1994 the library was moved to another building on Pushkinskaya Street, and since then Velikanova Mansion houses Rostov Art College named after M.B. Grekov.
