= Kursk State University Library =

Library in Kursk, Russia

Coordinates: 51.7351°N 36.1908°E

- Научная библиотека Курского государственного университета
- Location: 33 Radischev St., Kursk, Russia
- Type: Academic library
- Established: 1934

Collection
- Items collected: books, journals, newspapers, magazines and prints
- Size: 700,000 items (approx.)
- Criteria for collection: academic and scientific publications

Access and use
- Members: more than 12,000

Other information
- Director: Alla V. Alyabyeva
- Employees: 70
- Website: lib.kursksu.ru

The Kursk State University Library is a library in Kursk State University. The library was founded in 1934 simultaneously with the opening of Kursk State Pedagogical Institute.

== Overview ==
The Kursk State University Library was founded July 22, 1934.

== Collection ==
The library сollection has more than 700,000 units.

== Information technology ==
The library uses the automated library-information system "Ruslan", which contains the online public access catalog of library collections, full-text electronic versions of the publications of the scientists of the University, full-text publications of the antique сollection (rare books and limited editions) of the academic library.

== See also ==
- List of libraries in Russia
