= List of libraries in Russia =

This is a partial list of libraries in Russia, including some of the larger and more unique libraries in the country. As of 2006, the national Ministry of Culture and Mass Communications estimated that Russia had around 3,000 university libraries, 5,700 state-funded research libraries, 48,300 public libraries, and 66,000 school libraries.

== Libraries by federal district ==
=== Central ===
- Art Library of A.P. Bogolyubov
- Gorky Library, Tver
- Institute of Scientific Information on Social Sciences of the Russian Academy of Sciences
- Kursk Oblast Scientific Library
- Kursk State University Library
- Lipetsk Regional Universal Scientific Library
- Margarita Rudomino All-Russia State Library for Foreign Literature
- Nekrasov Central Library
- Research Library of Moscow State University
- Russian State Art Library
- Russian State Children's Library
- Russian State Library
- Russian National Public Library for Science and Technology
- Smolensk Regional Universal Scientific Library named after. A.T. Tvardovsky
- State Public Historical Library of Russia
- Turgenev Library and Reading Room, Moscow

=== Far Eastern ===
See also: List of libraries in Vladivostok (in Russian)

- Magadan Regional Scientific Library named after A.S. Pushkin

=== North Caucasian ===
- National Scientific Library of the Republic of North Ossetia

=== Northwestern ===
See also: List of libraries of St. Petersburg (in Russian)

- Boris Yeltsin Presidential Library
- Kaliningrad Regional Children's Library. A.P. Gaidar
- Kaliningrad Regional Science Library
- Library of the Russian Academy of Sciences
- National Library of Russia
- Novgorod Regional Universal Scientific Library
- St. Petersburg Theatre Library
- Vyborg Library (Russian: МАУК "Библиотека А. Аалто", lit. 'MAUK "A. Aalto Library"')

=== Siberian ===
- Altai Regional Universal Scientific Library named after. V.Ya. Shishkova
- Central City Children's Library named after. A. P. Gaidar, Zheleznogorsk
- Kemerovo Regional Scientific Library
- National Library of the Republic of Tuva named after. A. S. Pushkin
- Omsk State Library
- Siberian Scientific Agricultural Library
- State Public Scientific and Technological Library of the Siberian Branch of the Russian Academy of Sciences

=== Southern ===
- Central Research Library of the Rostov Region
- Chekhov Library
- Don State Public Library
- Volgograd Regional Universal Scientific Library named after. M. Gorky

=== Ural ===
- Kurgan Regional Universal Scientific Library named after. A.K. Yugova
- Sverdlovsk Regional Universal Library named after V. G. Belinsky

=== Volga ===
See also: List of libraries in Samara (in Russian)

- National Library of Mordovia
- National Library of the Republic of Tatarstan
- Perm Regional Children's Library named after. L. I. Kuzmina
- Samara Regional Children's Library
- Samara Regional Universal Scientific Library
- Samara Regional Youth Library

== Digital libraries ==
- CyberLeninka
- Lib.ru
- National Electronic Library

== Defunct ==
- Library of Ukrainian Literature, Moscow
- Lost Library of Ivan the Terrible

== See also ==
- Legal deposit in Russia
- List of archives in Russia
- List of the largest libraries in Russia (in Russian)
- List of Russian studies centers
- People's House#Russian Empire
- Russian literature
- List of libraries in Ukraine
