= Omsk State Library =

Library in Omsk, Russia

Coordinates: 54.9925°N 73.3602°E

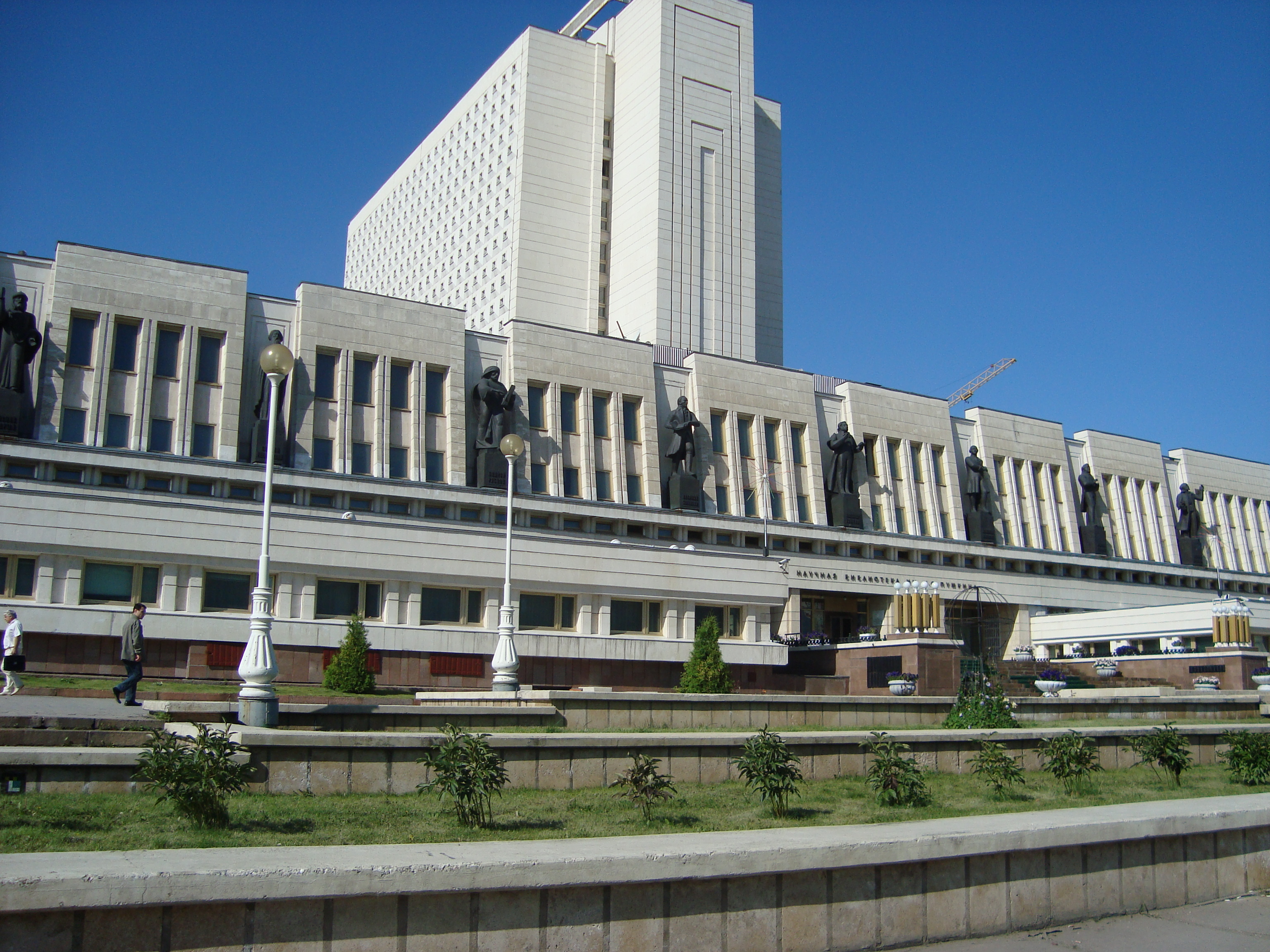
The new building of the library.

The Omsk State Regional Research Library, named after Alexander Pushkin, is the oldest public library in Omsk and is the main research library in the region.

== History ==
In 1899 the Omsk Municipal Duma made a decision to open a municipal public library in honour of Alexander Pushkin's centenary. The library was opened in January 1907. It was located in the extension to the Municipal Duma. Two adjoining rooms were set aside for the reading hall and lending facilities. The library initially held 4160 books and magazines and attracted 370 readers in its first year.

Since 1940 the library has received copies of all books published in the country. During the Great Patriotic War all the activity of the Pushkin library was subordinated to the war time needs. The employees had to answer the inquiries of specialists from industrial enterprises, theatres and organizations that were evacuated to Omsk from the European part of the country.

On April 28, 1995, the library moved to a new building designed by Vasily Trokhimchuk. The library achieved the status of the Central State Library of the Omsk Region.

== The architectural and sculptural design ==
Vasily Trokhimchuk began to work on the architectural and sculptural design of the new building in 1982. Eight 3.5m made of hammered blued copper occupy niches along the principal front, representing outstanding figures of Russia of a thousand years of Russian history.

== Visits ==
- In 1923 the Omsk central library was visited by the people's commissar of education A.V. Lunacharsky.

== See also ==
- List of libraries in Russia
