= Sinyaya Ptitsa =

Soviet musical group

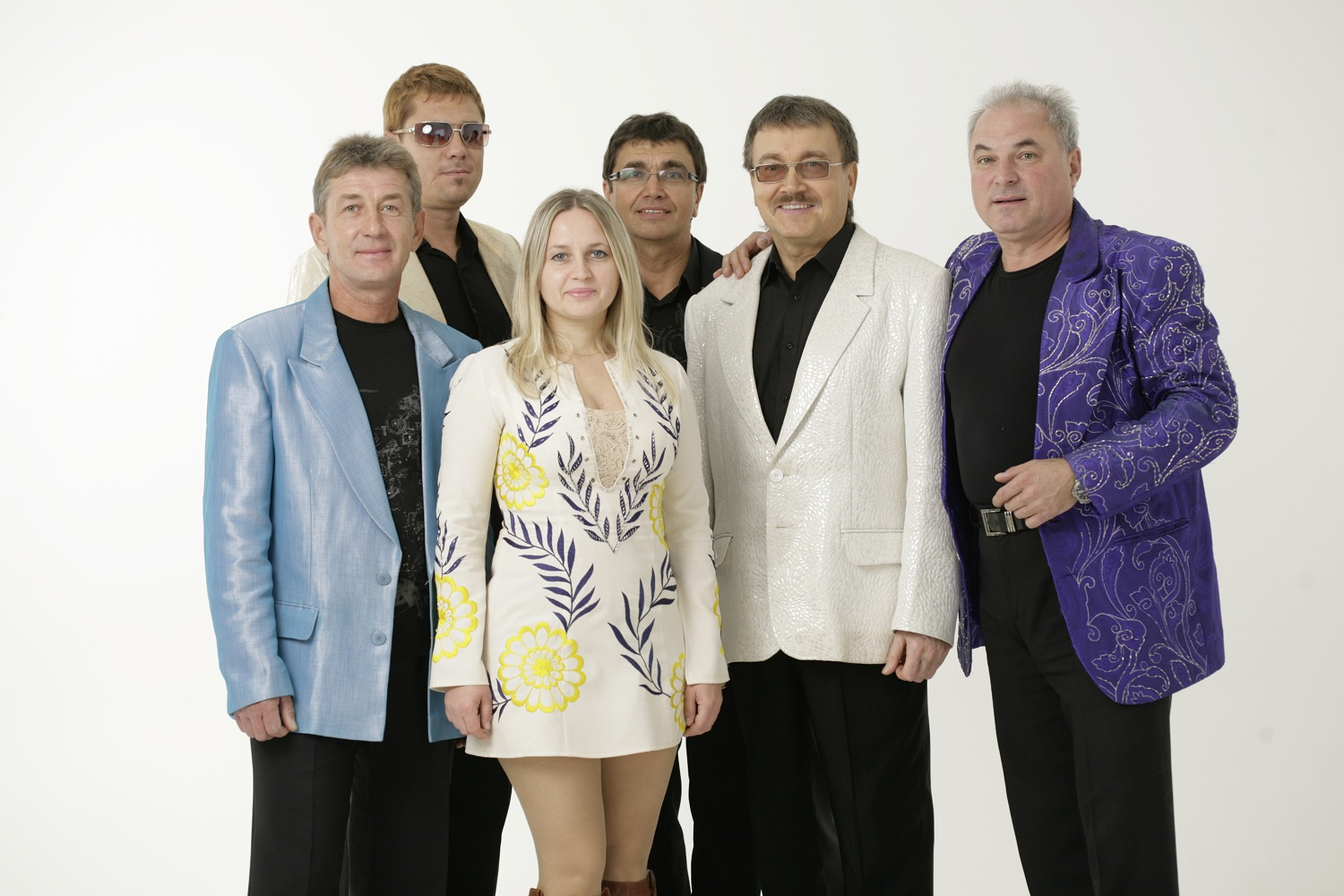

Background information
- Origin: Gomel, Belarus; Samara, Russia
- Genres: Pop, rock
- Years active: 1972–1991

Sinyaya Ptitsa (Russian: Синяя птица, The Blue Bird) was a Soviet music group, vocal and instrumental ensemble, which existed from 1972 to 1991. Later, several Russian musical groups created by former members of the original band took the name Sinyaya Ptitsa.

== History ==
The band formed in 1972 in the city of Gomel (Belarus) as vocal-instrumental ensemble We, You and Guitar. In 1986 the group took part in the festival Rock for Peace in the Czech town of Sokolovo, and then sent to entertain Soviet troops in Germany.

According to Rossiyskaya Gazeta, Drozdov was one of the recognizable voices in the Soviet Union.

=== Composition VIA Blue Bird (1972-1991) ===
- Valentin Barkov (bass guitar, vocals)
- Yuri Bankovsky (violin)
- Boris Belotserkovsky (drums)
- Robert Bolotny (saxophone)
- Mikhail Bolotny (mus. head, keyboards)
- Victor Varvalyuk (drums)
- Yevgeny Voynov (vocals)
- Oleg Gazmanov (sound engineer)
- Dmitry Galitsky (vocals, keyboards)
- Vladimir Gaponov (guitar)
- Eduard Deyneko (trumpet)
- Igor Dotsenko (drums)
- Sergey Drozdov (bass guitar, vocals)
- Yevgeny Zavyalov (vocals)
- Alexander Zverovich (vocals)
- Sergei Kastorsky (keyboards)
- Oleg Kolesnichenko (vocals)
- Alexey Komarov (drums)
- Yakov Kulishevsky (vocals)
- Svetlana Lazareva (vocals)
- Sergei Levkin (guitar, vocals)
- Vitaly Loos (trombone)
- Gennady Matviyenko (guitar)
- Valery Melnikov (trumpet)
- Yuri Metelkin (vocals)
- Alexander Mostovoy (guitar)
- Anatoly Murygin (guitar)
- Lev Panin (violin)
- Nikolai Parfenyuk (vocals)
- Vladimir Preobrazhensky (vocals)
- Valery Pronin (violin)
- Alexander Pruzhinin (keyboards)
- Victor Ryabkov (vocals)
- Anna Salmina (vocals)
- Igor Sarukhanov (guitar, vocals)
- Vladimir Ulyanov (violin)
- Yuri Humaryan (guitar)
- Igor Shablovsky (guitar)
- Vladimir Shurigin (guitar)
- Valery Yushchenko (vocals)
- Jury Janin (guitar)
