= Ignatiy Stelletsky =

Ignatius Yakovlevich Stelletskii (Russian: Игнатий Яковлевич Стеллецкий; February 3, 1878 - November 11, 1949) was a Russian and Soviet archaeologist, historian, and researcher of the tunnels of Moscow. He was known to make searches for the library of Ivan the Terrible all throughout his life. He is considered to be the founder of the urban exploration movement in Russia.

== Biography ==
=== Early years ===
Ignatius Stelletski was born on February 3, 1878, in a village in the territory of modern Ukraine. His mother was a secondary school teacher, and his father was a clergyman.

He graduated from the Kiev Theological Academy in 1905, and within half a year he was teaching history and geography at the Russian-Arab Seminary in Nazareth. During this period of his life he visited Egypt, Turkey, and Syria, where he became interested in archaeology. This passion was so strong that in 1907 he left his job to settle in Moscow, where he entered the Moscow Archaeological Institute.

In February 1912, Stelletskii organized the Commission for the Study of Underground Antiquities, which was built to study the tunnels of Moscow.

Later in the 1910s, Stelletskii began searching for the Library of Ivan the Terrible, even though historians doubted the existence of the supposed library. He attempted to obtain permission to conduct excavations in the Moscow Kremlin; however, the Tsarist government did not allow him to.

In 1914, while exploring the archives of Pärnu, Estonia, Stelletskii found “Dabelov’s Catalog of The Library of Ivan the Terrible.” Further studies were cut short because of World War I.

=== World War I and the Russian Civil War ===
In August 1914, Stelletskii returned to Moscow because of World War I.

After the start of the Russian Civil War, Stelletskii became a Professor of the Ukrainian University, where he taught a course in Archaeology.

=== Work in Soviet Russia ===
In the fall of 1923, Stelletskii returned to Russia once again. He began to search for books on the underground of the Kremlin. In 1925, he once again asked the Soviet government to allow him to search the Kremlin for the library. Finally, in 1929, the Soviet government allowed him. On December 1, 1933, excavations began, and were carried out under Arsenalnaya towers. In December 1934, the excavations were discontinued because of Sergey Kirov’s assassination.

Stelletskii also had plans to open a museum on the “Underground Tunnels of Moscow.”

=== World War II ===
Stelletskii remained in Moscow during World War II. Despite suffering from hunger dystrophy, he prepared a manuscript of his book “Dead in Moscow Cache”, which was published several years later, in 1993.

It is believed that Stelletskii wanted to search the Kremlin yet again after the war was over, yet due to his health issues, he could not.

=== Death ===
Stelletskii died on November 1, 1949, and was buried in the Vagankovo Cemetery.

His grave was lost after his burial, but in Spring 2010 a member of the Nekropolist society, (a Russian society composed of people interested in tombstones and notable dead people) found it, although it was in poor condition.
