= Yuri Metelkin =

Russian musician (born 1953)

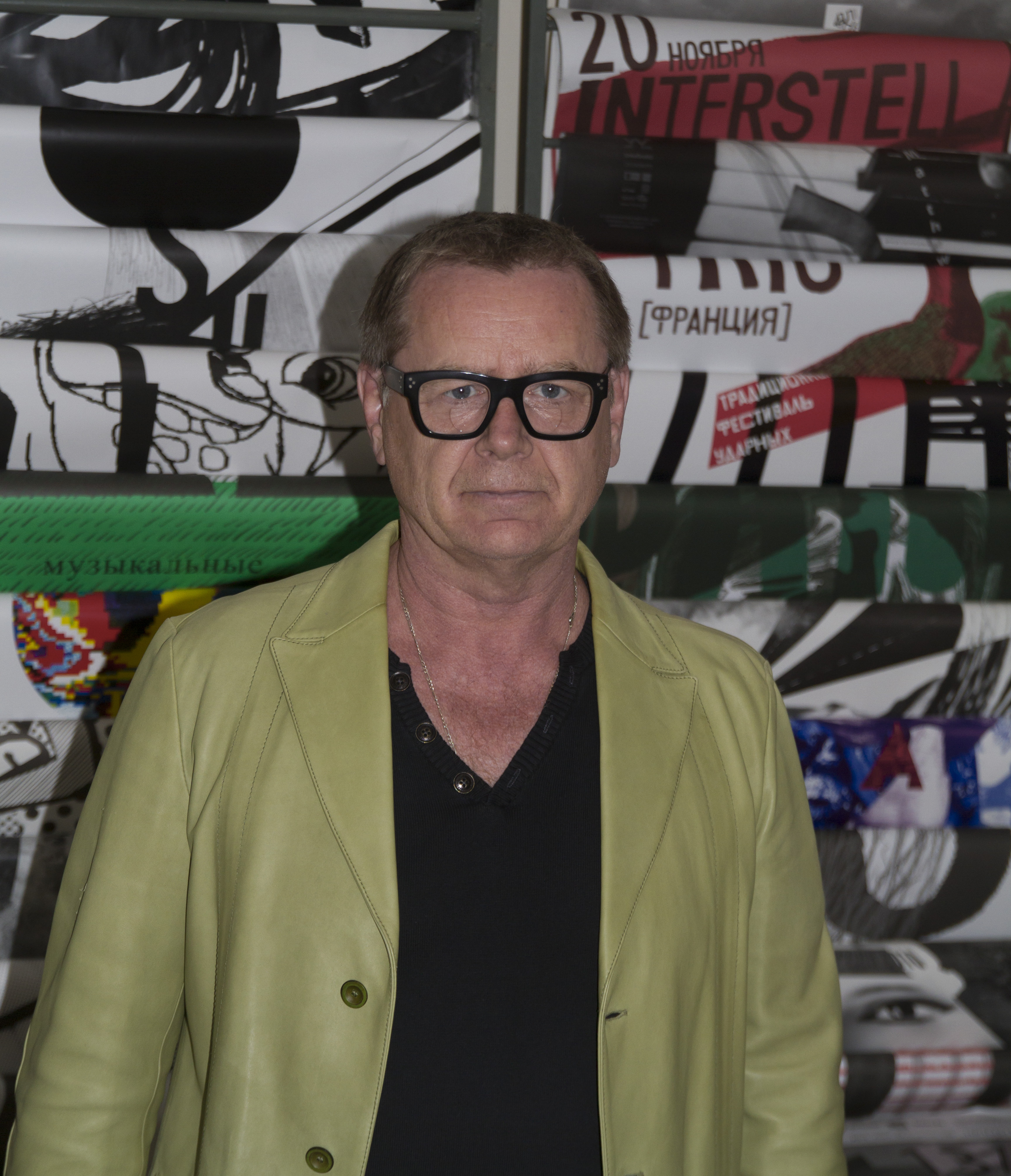
- Born: Yuri Ivanovich Metelkin; 27 June 1953 (age 72); Gomel, Belarusian SSR, Soviet Union
- Occupation: singer
- Years active: since 1972

Yuri Ivanovich Metelkin (Russian: Юрий Ива́нович Метёлкин, sometimes Metyolkin; born June 27, 1953, Gomel) is a Soviet and Russian musician, poet, vocalist and a cofounder of Soviet musical group VIA Sinyaya Ptitsa. He is the author of several non-commercial Internet projects, including “Old Radio”, “Audiopedia”, and “Witness”.

== Early life ==
Metelkin was born on June 27, 1953, in Gomel in the Belarusian SSR. His father, Ivan Ivanovich Metelkin (1922–1992) was a driver, and participated in the Great Patriotic War. His mother, Valentina Mikhailovna Abrosimova (born 1925) is an accountant.

After graduating from high school in 1971–1974, he studied at the department of cultural and educational work of the Gomel Music and Pedagogical School. He studied 1983–1987 at the faculty of the same name at the Moscow State Institute of Culture.

== Career ==
Metelkin was the lead singer of Sinyaya Ptitsa from 1972 to 1977. In July 1977, for creative reasons, Metelkin left the group and moved to Moscow. Subsequently, until Perestroika, he worked in musical groups of the Moscow Association of Musical Ensembles (MOMA), including 12 years as a vocalist, as part of an ensemble led by jazz pianist Gabil Zeynalov.

In the 1990s, he was forced to leave the profession and engaged in various forms of commercial activity. In 2007, he began to conduct non-profit cultural Internet projects “Old Radio” and “Audiopedia”, related to the search, restoration, preservation and provision of universal and free access to the radio heritage of the “Golden Age of Radio Theater”. Metelkin is advocates shortening the term of copyright and the speedy transfer of the cultural heritage of the peoples of the USSR to the public domain.

In April 2013, Metelkin donated 30 thousand reels of magnetic film with stock recordings of the USSR to the State Television and Radio Fund.

== Personal life ==
He married Tatyana, the sister of his Sinyaya Ptitsa colleague Vladimir Shurygin.

== Recognition ==
- Moscow Oblast Governor Award 2014
- Free Knowledge Award 2016
