= Moscow University Herbarium =

Herbarium in Moscow, Russia

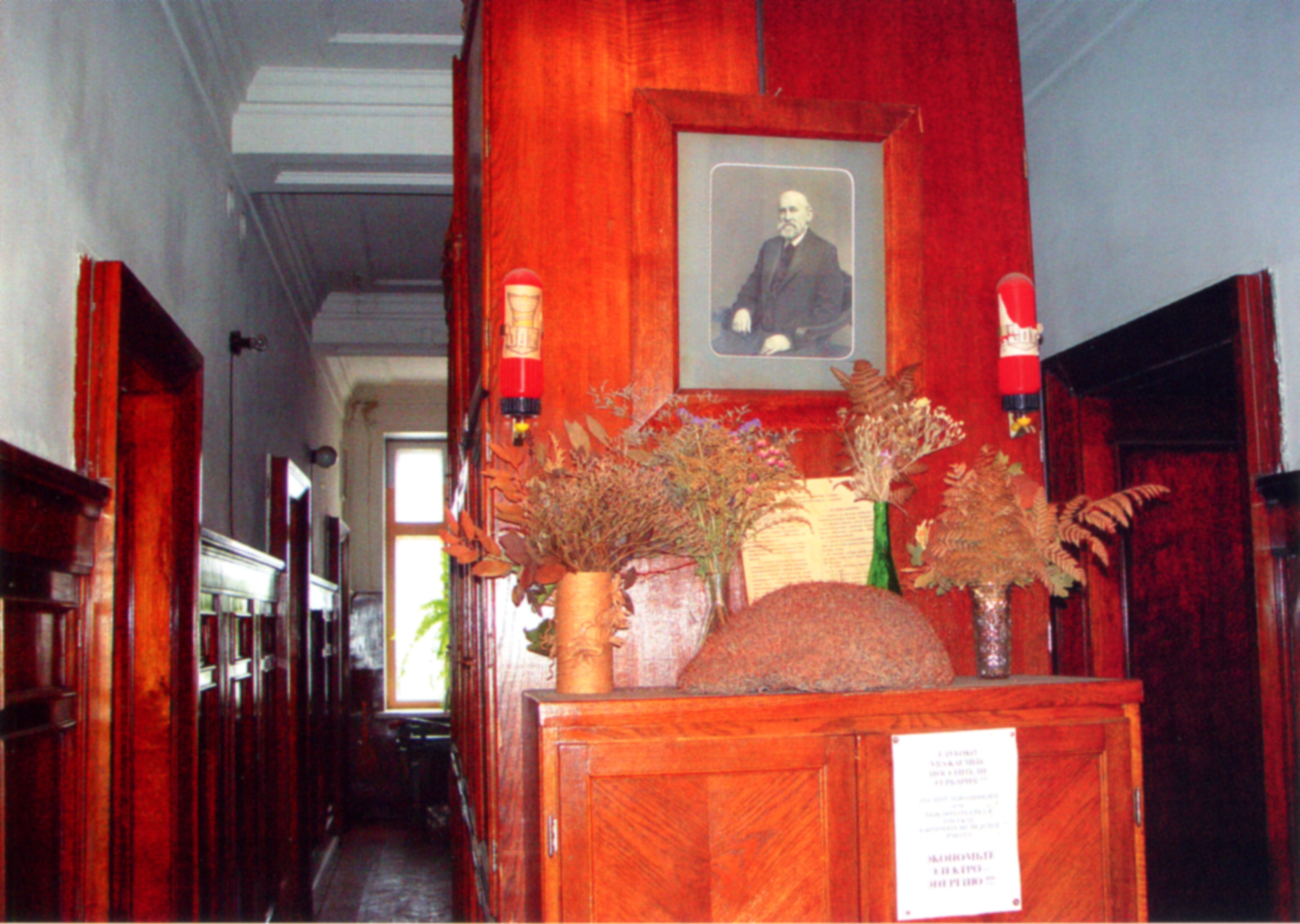
Moscow State University Herbarium

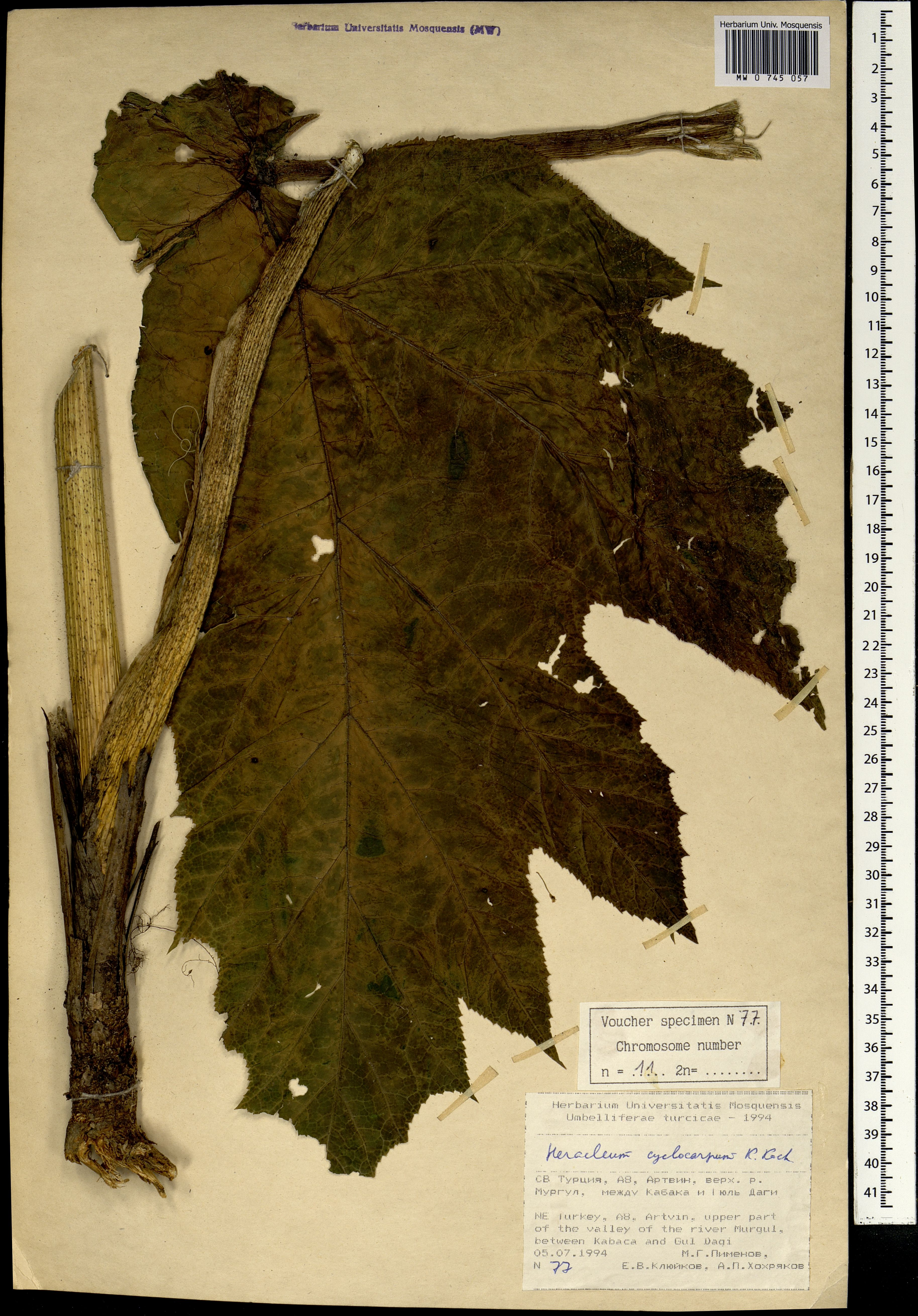
Example of specimen from the Moscow State University Herbarium

The Moscow University Herbarium (MW) is the second largest herbarium in Russia after the Komarov Institute (LE).

The herbarium is focused on the flora of temperate Eurasia with an emphasis on the flora of Russia. The collections of MW include 1,030,669 specimens (including about 5,000 type specimens, the 62nd largest such collection in the world) representing 37,100 species and subspecies of vascular plants and 2,223 species and subspecies of bryophytes. MW holds some important historical collections by G.F. Hoffmann, J.F. Ehrhart, C.B. Trinius, J.R. and J.G.A. Forsters, etc.

The Moscow University Herbarium added its millionth specimen to the collections in June 2016. The average annual growth of the collection in 2005–2016 was 15,100 specimens, with 22,013 specimens added to the herbarium in 2016. Since 2005, major accessions originated from Eastern Europe, Siberia and Russian Far East, the Caucasus, and South Asia (vascular plants); Taimyr, Russian Far East, and North Caucasus (bryophytes).

The Moscow University Herbarium has gained budget for the digitisation of collections within the Program of the National Depository Bank of Live Systems, and around 911,000 specimens (89%) were scanned since May 2015. All these records are published already online, including JPG images and metadata required for indexing. Specimen imaging of the collection was completed at the end of 2018.

Currently, the Moscow Digital Herbarium holds the largest digitised herbarium collections from Russia, Ukraine, Mongolia, Georgia, Abkhazia, South Ossetia, Azerbaijan, Belarus, Moldova, Latvia, as well as from Kazakhstan, Kyrgyzstan, Uzbekistan, Turkmenistan, and Tajikistan. Also, Moscow Digital Herbarium is the second largest hub of digitised herbarium collections from Armenia, Lithuania, North Korea, Mali and the third largest for Cyprus and Vietnam.
