= Russian National Public Library for Science and Technology =

Library in Moscow, Russia

Russian National Public Library for Science and Technology (GPNTB) Государственная публичная научно-техническая библиотека (ГПНТБ)
- Location: Moscow, Russia
- Type: National library, Research library
- Established: 1958

Collection
- Items collected: books, journals, electronic media
- Size: 8 million

Other information
- Director: Alexander Sergeevich Karaush
- Employees: 720
- Website: Official website

The Russian National Public Library for Science and Technology (Russian: Государственная Публичная Научно-Техническая Библиотека России, romanized: Gosudarstvennaya Publichnaya Nauchno-Tekhnicheskaya Biblioteka Rossii), abbreviated GPNTB (Russian: ГПНТБ) is a national library for engineering, science, and technology in Moscow, Russia. It was founded in 1958 on the basis of the State Science Library of the Ministry of Higher Education of the Soviet Union. It is located in Khoroshyovsky district of Moscow.

The mission of the library is to collect and store national and foreign science and technical literature, then disseminate information and bibliographical services for commercial, organisations and other institutions of the Russian Federation, development and application of up-to-date automated information technologies.

== See also ==
- List of libraries in Russia
