= Nekrasov Central Library =

Library in Moscow, Russia

Nekrasov Library
- Центральная универсальная научная библиотека имени Н. А. Некрасова

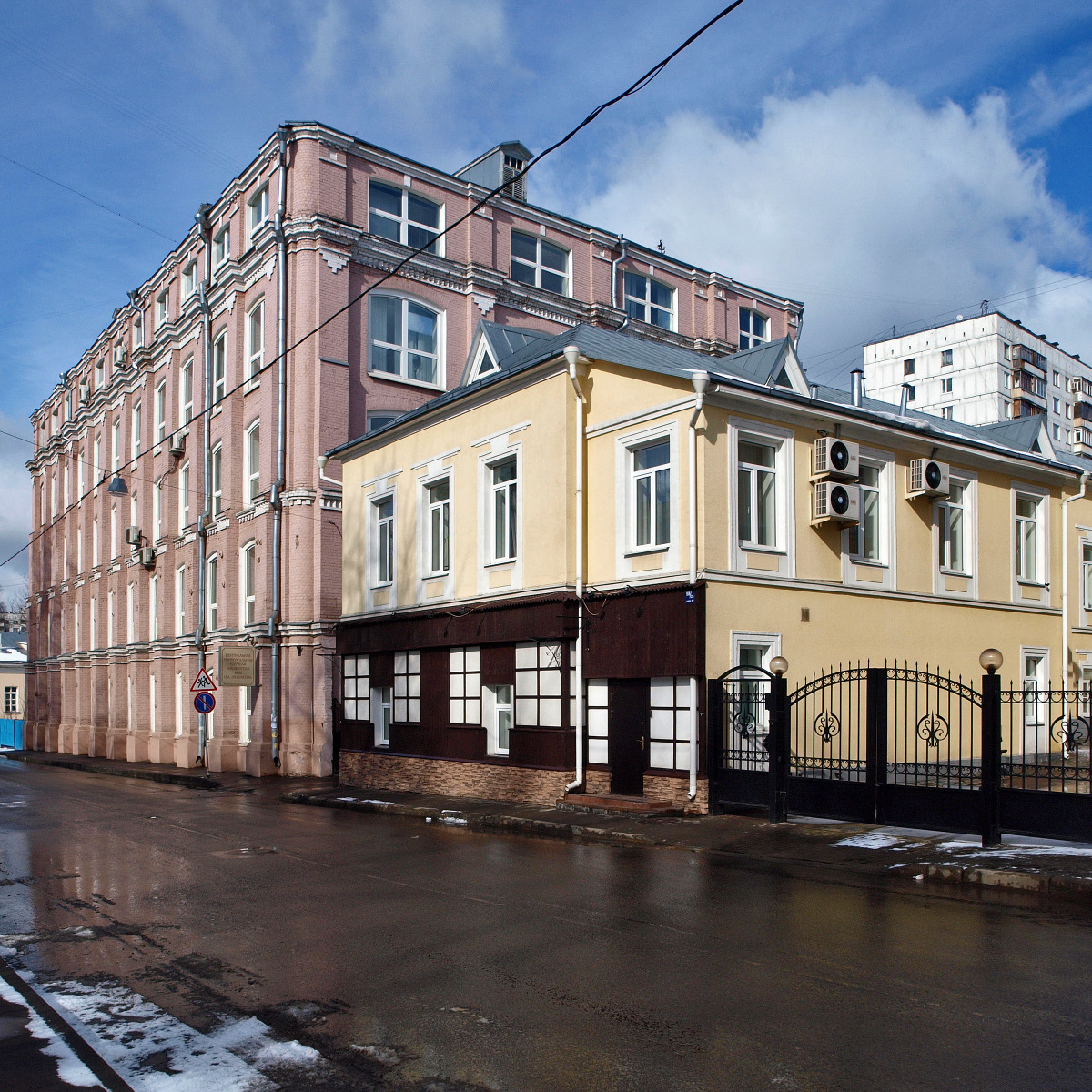
- Location: Moscow, Russia
- Established: 1919; 107 years ago
- Branches: 3

Collection
- Size: 1 117 399 (2019)

Access and use
- Population served: 13515 (2018)

Other information
- Director: Maria Privalova
- Employees: 150
- Website: nekrasovka.ru

The Central Universal Science Nekrasov Library (Russian: Центральная универсальная научная библиотека имени Н. А. Некрасова; English: Nekrasov Library) is a public library located in Moscow and founded in 1919. The library receives its name after Russian poet and writer Nikolay Nekrasov. With over 2 million items in more than 100 languages, Nekrasov Library is a public library service for Moscow citizens.

== History ==
By 1941, the library's book fund consisted of 193 599 copies and there were 43 899 readers. During World War II, the library served veterans and became a centre for the formation of mobile libraries for the front.

== Nekrasov Central City Public Nekrasov Library ==
Following the decision of the Government and due to the 125 anniversary of the poet and democrat N. A. Nekrasov, in 1946 the library was given his name. In 1955 the library moved from Arbat to the estate of A. S. Saltykova, on Bolshaya Bronnaya street.

== Nekrasov Central Universal Scientific Library ==
By the beginning of the 1970s, the library contained a substantial fund of literature focusing on art. Owing to this fund and Moscow collectors’ gifts, the library opened a specialized art literature and art department. In 2002 the library moved to Baumanskaya street, 58/25, building 14.That year it got the website: www.nekrasovka.ru. In 2006, by the order of the Moscow Department of Culture the Nekrasov Central City Public Library was renamed for the Nekrasov Central Universal Scientific Library.

== Fund ==
The fund of literature on art and fine products includes books on all kinds of arts, antique editions, the fund of reproductions, collections of industrial graphics, ex-libris and phillumeny.

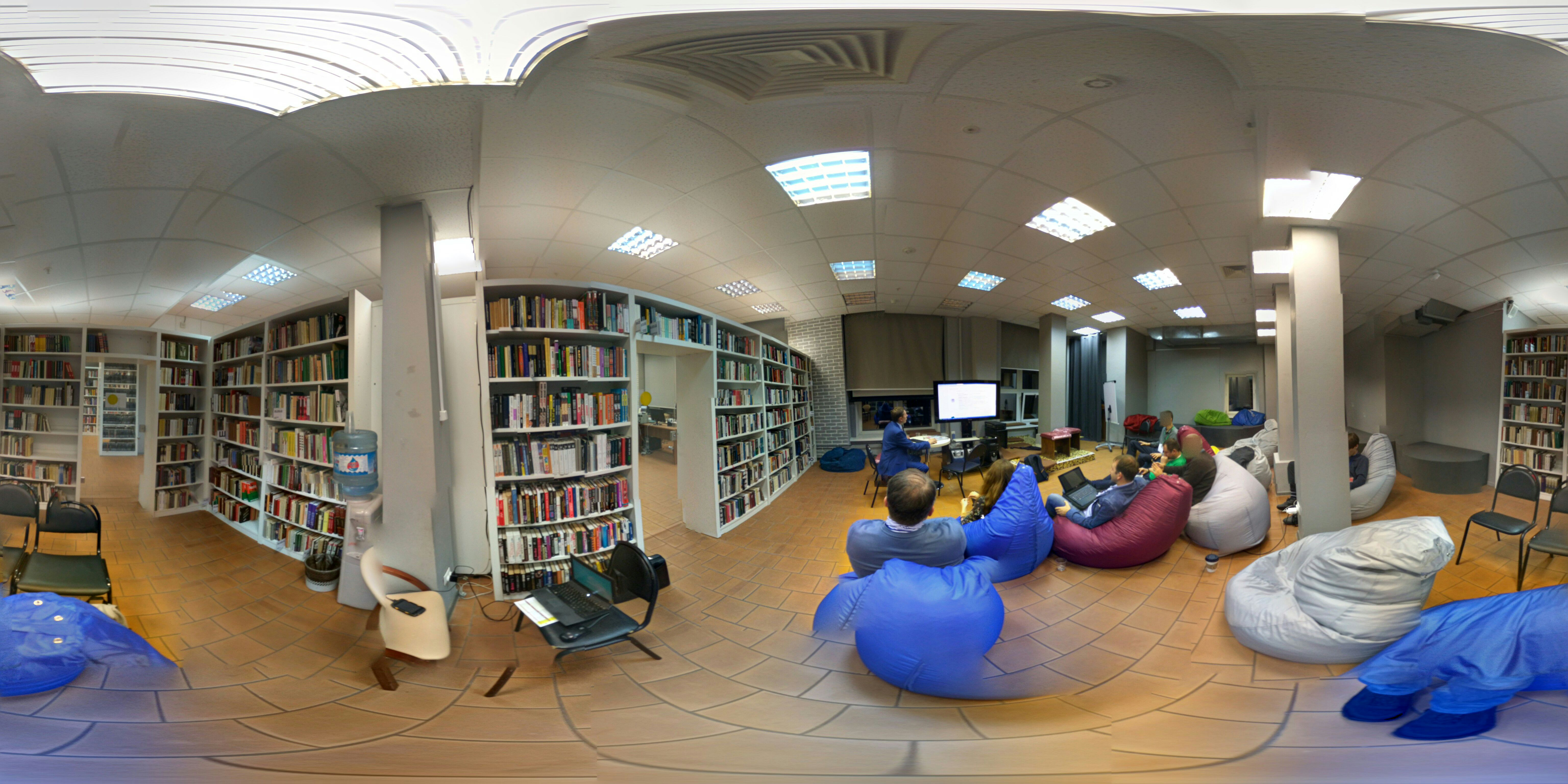

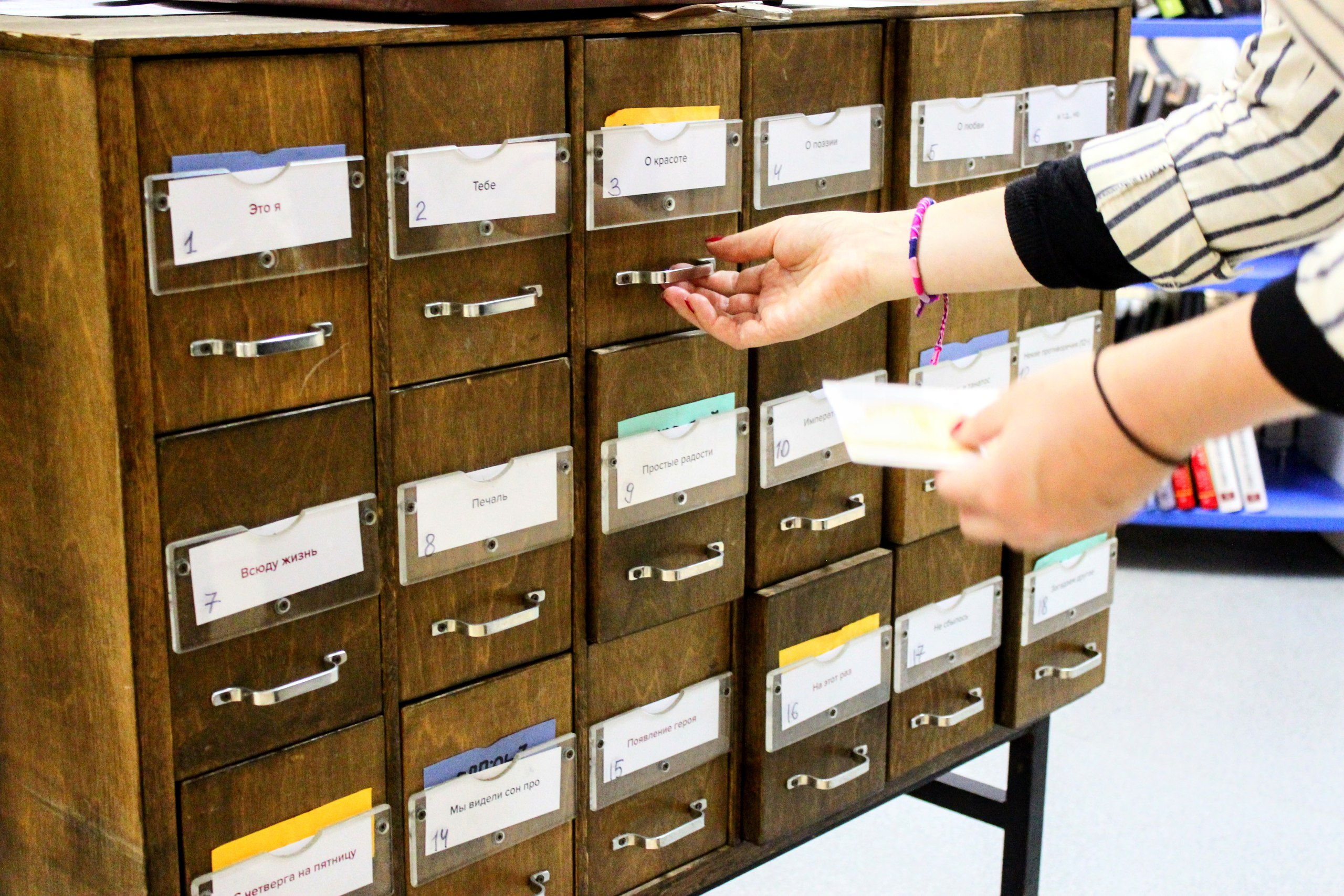

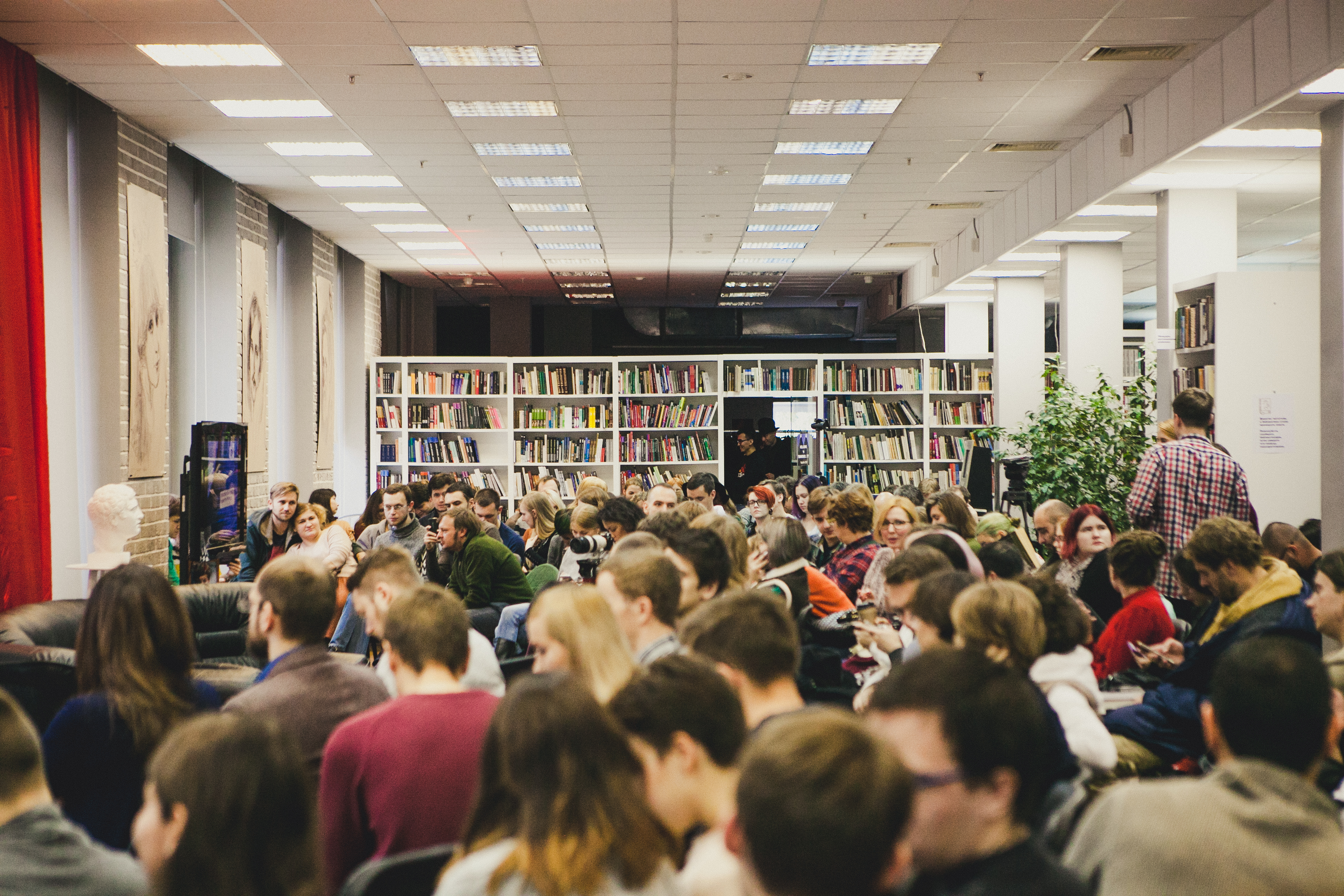

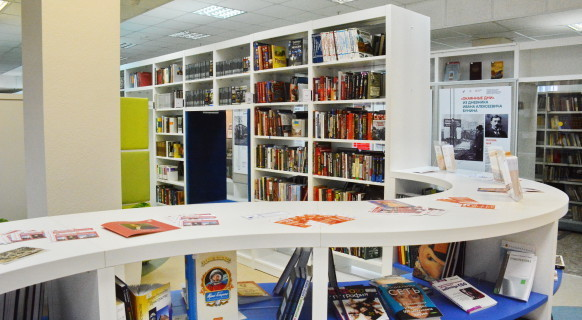

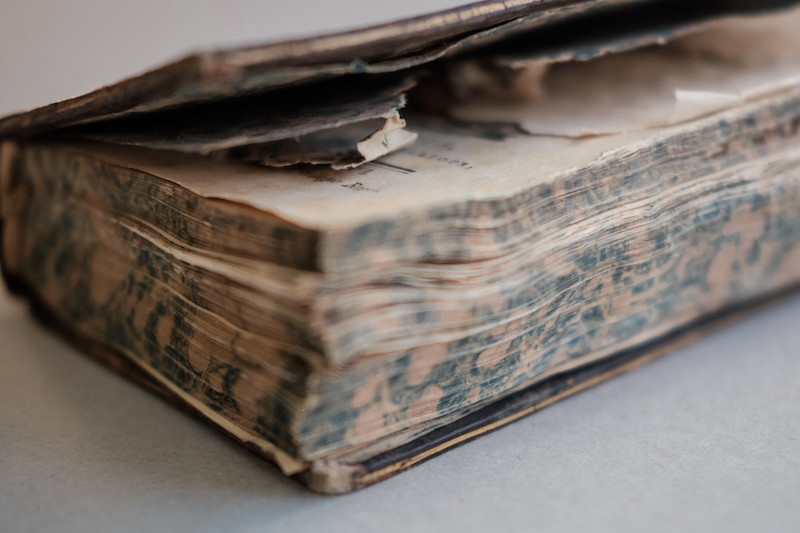

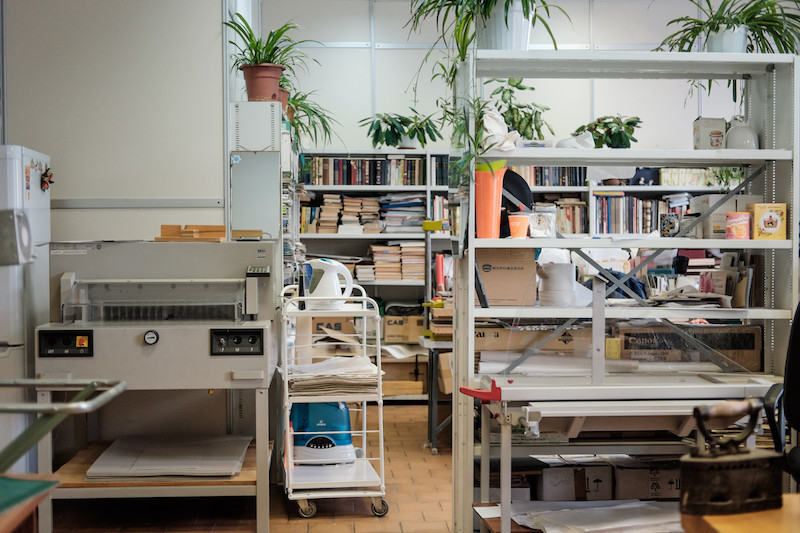

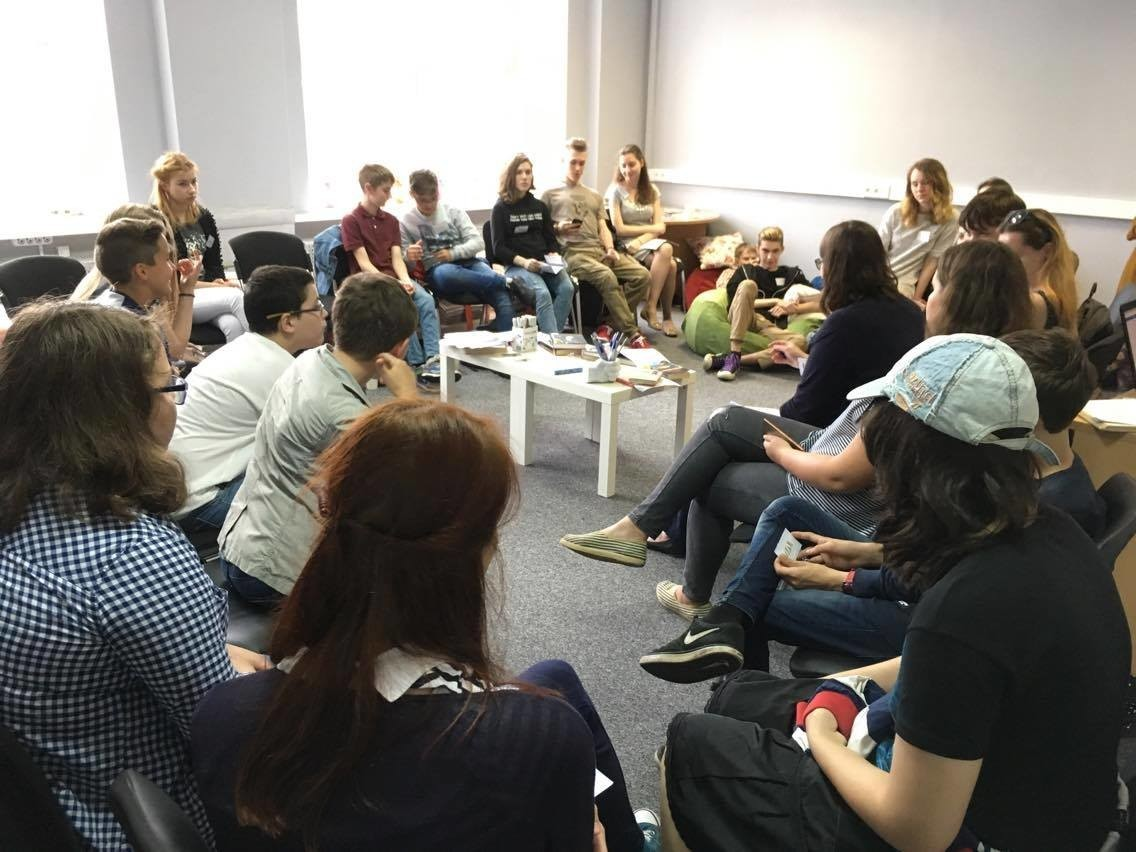

== Structure ==
The library has more than ten departments, including the department of cultural and educational projects and programs, the department of reading and collections promotion, the department of restoration and conservation of editions.

== Affiliates ==
- Point of book delivery in the shopping center "Oceania". 121170, Moscow, 57 Kutuzovsky prospect, 4th floor (Slavyansky bulvar metro station). It is the first library point in a shopping and entertainment center in Russia. Its visitors can sign up for the Nekrasov Library, take books home, order or return books from the main fund of the library and get acquainted with book novelties;
- Point of book delivery in the shopping mall "Vodny". Moscow, 5 Golovinskoye Chaussee, 2nd floor (Vodny Stadion metro station);

== Projects ==
The library supports the bookcrossing movement and regularly holds book exchange actions.

In 2017 the project "Electronekrasovka" was launched – a new site for the library's digitized collections.

In 1920s Korney Chukovsky, who studied Nekrasov's works, made and distributed a "Questionnaire about Nekrasov" among writers. Famous poets and writers answered ten questions: which Nekrasov's poems they considered the best, whether Nekrasov influenced their own work, whether they considered him an immoral person and so on.

== Library publications ==
The library periodically published bibliographic indexes to national memorial dates and albums-catalogues based on the collections of the library's rare fund.

== Events ==
Every year the library holds more than 500 mass socially significant events.

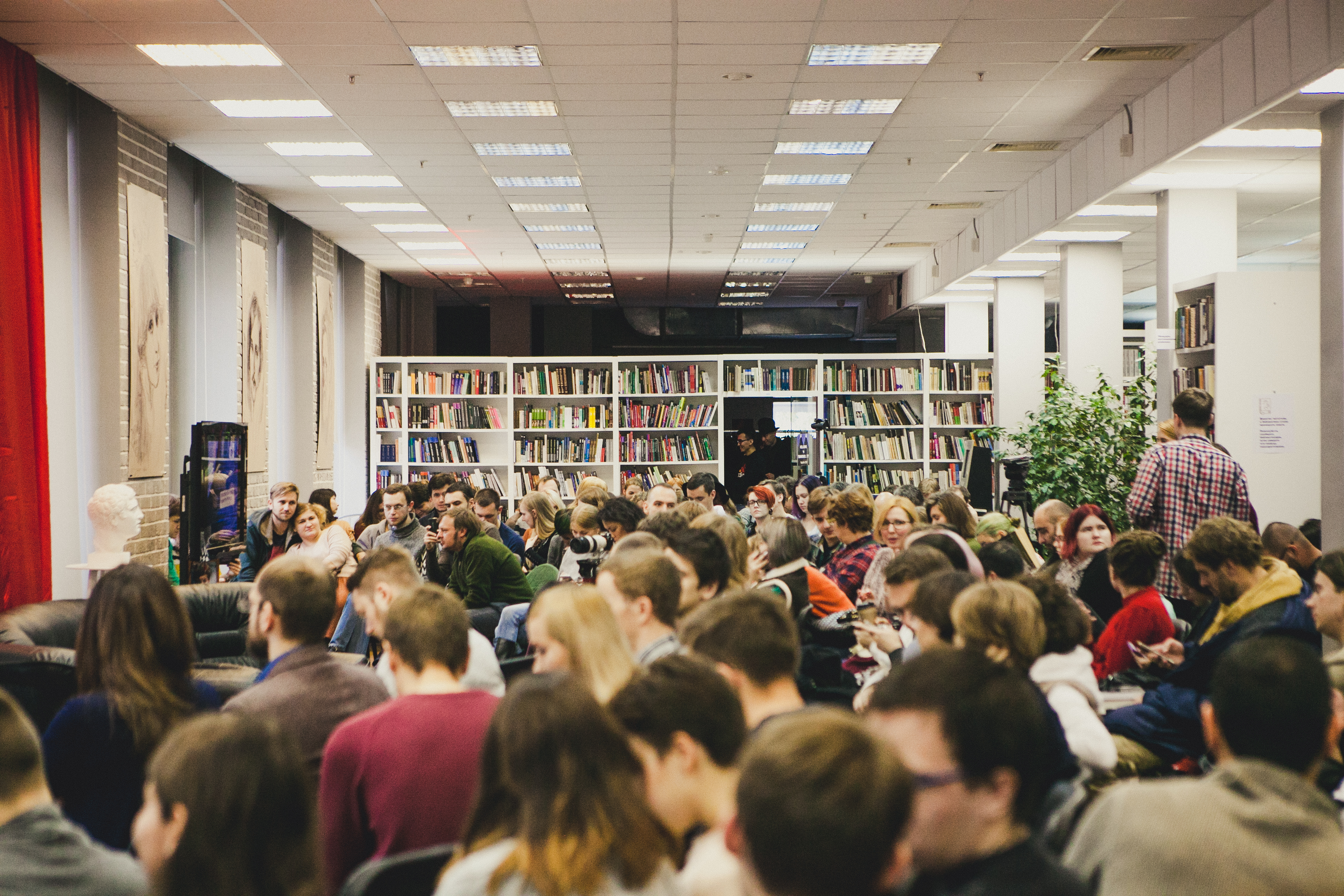

== See also ==
- List of libraries in Russia
