= Krylov State Research Center =

Russian research institute

Coordinates: 59°49′30″N 30°21′38″E

- Native name: Крыловский государственный научный центр
- Industry: Shipbuilding
- Founded: March 8, 1894; 132 years ago
- Headquarters: Saint Petersburg, Russia
- Key people: Andrei Dutov
- Products: Ships
- Number of employees: 3,000
- Website: krylov-center.ru

The Krylov State Research Center (Russian: Крыловский государственный научный центр, romanized: Krylovskiy gosudarstvenny nauchny tsentr) is a Russian shipbuilding research and development institute, which operates as a federal state-owned unitary enterprise.

The institute is named after Aleksey Krylov, the Russian naval designer and mathematician who was one of its first superintendents, and is based in Saint Petersburg.

== History ==
The institute was established in 1894, to operate the Russian Empire's first ship model basin—the Naval Administration Towing Tank—on New Holland Island in Saint Petersburg. On 8 March that year, Emperor Alexander III and members of the royal family toured the facility, which is considered the foundation date of the institute. On 3 January 1900, Aleksey Krylov was appointed acting superintendent of the Tank, and proposed the establishment of a broader shipbuilding research institute based around the tank, including laboratories for electrical engineering, and physical, chemical and mechanical testing.

Originally subordinate to the Ministry of Shipbuilding Industry of the Soviet Union, the Krylov Shipbuilding Research Institute (KSRI) worked only for the Soviet Navy, but now operates in all ship science disciplines, and conducts sponsored research for international commercial shipbuilding companies.

== Management ==
=== CEO ===
Savchenko Oleg Vladislavovich

=== Founders ===
- Federal Agency for State Property Management
- Ministry of Industry and Trade of the Russian Federation

== Sanctions ==
On June 28, 2022, the United States Department of the Treasury's Office of Foreign Assets Control (OFAC) imposed sanctions against Krylov State Research Center in response to the Russian military invasion of Ukraine.

== See also ==
- Transactions of the Krylov State Research Center
