= CyberLeninka =

Russian scientific electronic library

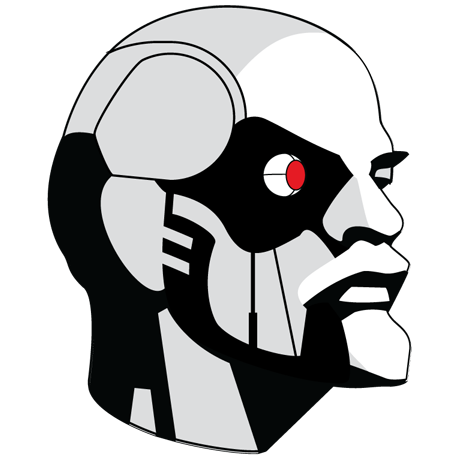
- Available in: Russian, English
- Website: cyberleninka.ru

CyberLeninka (Russian: КиберЛенинка) is a Russian scientific electronic library working according to the model of open science. It has a vast collection of written scientific works available via free licences.

Per Webometrics, it is accounted to be in the top 5 open archives in the world. Per Russian rating measurers LiRu and Rambler, it is considered to be the largest scientific and educational online library with legal content across the Internet in Russia.

The name is an allusion to V. I. Lenin State Library of the USSR, now Russian State Library, the biggest and main public library in the USSR and Russia, situated in a monumental building next to Moscow Kremlin. The logo features a stylized Lenin portrait. The founders are Dmitry Semyachkin, Mikhail Sergeev and Evgeny Kislyak.

In June 2019 it was announced that CyberLeninka will become the facility for making the journals of Moscow State University, Russia's main and oldest university, available to the public for free.

== See also ==
- List of libraries in Russia
