= Zakhar May =

Ukrainian musician (born 1969)

Zakhar May Захар Май
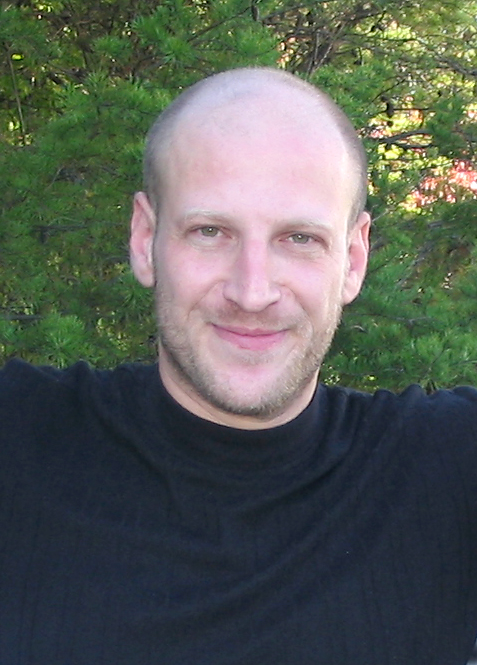

Background information
- Born: 25 June 1969 (age 57); Kharkiv, Ukrainian SSR, Soviet Union
- Genres: Rock
- Occupations: Singer; Songwriter
- Instrument: Singing
- Years active: 1987–present
- Website: ZaxarBorisych

Zakhar Borysovych May (Note: Ukrainian: Захар Борисович Май, romanized: Zakhar Borysovych Mai; Russian: Захар Борисович Май, romanized: Zakhar Borisovich May) (born June 25, 1969) is a Ukrainian musician, author of such songs as "Nahui", "Nashi Tanki" and "Russo Matrosso" and participant in festivals like Nashestvie 2002 and Lrylya 2003.

== Biography ==
Zahar Borisovich May was born in Kharkiv, USSR, Ukrainian Soviet Socialist Republic in 1969. He wrote his first song "Holodilnik pust" ("Empty refrigerator") in 1987, during first year in the University of Tartu. In 1988 his family moved to the United States where he continued to make music and worked as a programmer. Three of his albums, ...i nikogo drugogo (1995), Zavtrak na trave (2000) and Zolotoy pizdy volos (2002), were recorded here. From 2002 to 2012, he lived in Russia and played with St. Petersburg group Shiva, along with Sergey Chigrakov from Chizh & Co, Andrey Vasilyev from Raznyie Lyudi and Igor Dotsenko and Pavel Borisov from DDT. Before moving back to the United States, where he is a citizen, he participated in numerous protests against the 2011 Russian legislative election results.

== Social media ==
- (in Russian) Facebook
- (in Russian) VK
- (in Russian) Twitter
- (in Russian) LiveJournal
