= Igor Dotsenko =

- Born: Igor Dmitriyevich Dotsenko; July 16, 1953; Izyaslav, Khmelnytskyi Oblast, Ukrainian SSR, Soviet Union
- Died: December 7, 2014 (aged 61); Saint-Petersburg, Russia
- Occupations: drummer, percussionist, rock musician
- Musical career
- Genres: rock; pop; hard rock
- Instruments: drum; percussion instrument
- Labels: Melodiya; DDT Records; Grand Records; REAL Records; SoLyd Records; Navigator Records

Igor Dmitriyevich Dotsenko (Russian: И́горь Дми́триевич Доце́нко; July 16, 1953 – December 7, 2014) was a Soviet and Russian drummer, a member of the famous rock groups Sinyaya Ptitsa, DDT, and Chizh & Co.

== Biography ==
Dotsenko was born in Izyaslav, Khmelnytskyi Oblast, Ukrainian SSR. At the age of two, he ended up in Kaluga. From the 7th grade, a member of the school music ensemble. Don Brewer (Grand Funk) and John Henry Bonham (Led Zeppelin) remained Dotsenko's idols throughout his life.

In August 1979, one of his closest friends Vladimir Shurygin committed suicide. This event, according to Dotsenko, gave him strength and confidence in the need to develop his talent and try to leave a noticeable mark on the formation of Soviet rock.

In 1982, while working as a member of VIA Sinyaya Ptitsa, he moved to Leningrad, where he lived until his death. In 1986 he produced the album of the group Knockout, and in the same autumn he was invited by Yuri Shevchuk to the DDT. He also took part in the recording of the album of the group Nautilus Pompilius (Man Without A Name), with Yuri Morozov, Alisa (Solstice), Alexander Lyapin, Vadim Kurylev, and Zakhar May.

In June 2010, Igor Dotsenko announced his departure from the DDT, in which he worked for twenty-four years. Since the fall of 2010, Dotsenko resumed his musical career in the Chizh & Co.

He died at the age of 61 on the morning of December 7, 2014 after battling cancer, he was in the last stage of the disease.. He was buried in the cemetery of the village Daimishche in Gatchinsky District.
