= Chizh & Co =

Russian rock band

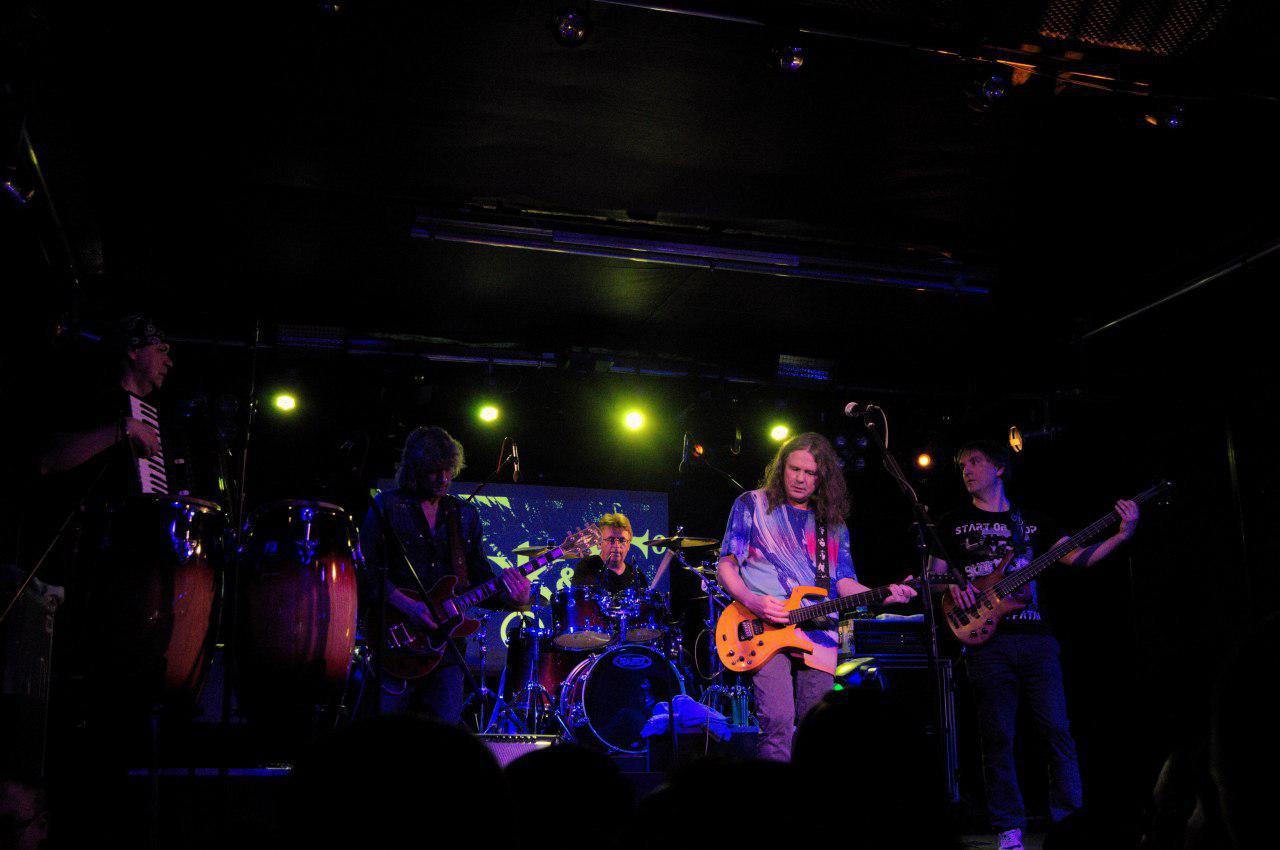

Background information
- Origin: Saint Petersburg, Russia
- Genres: Russian rock, Psychedelic rock, Blues-rock
- Years active: 1993–present
- Label: SoLyd Records
- Members: Sergey Chigrakov; Igor Dotsenko; Aleksei Romanyuk; Mikhail Rusin; Yeugeni Barinov
- Past members: Alexandr Kondrashkin; Mikhail Vladimirov; Vladimir Khanutin; Igor Fedorov; Igor Dotsenko; Vladimir Nazimov

Chizh & Co (Russian: Чиж & Co) is a Russian rock band, formed in the early 1990s by guitarist, vocalist and songwriter Sergey Chigrakov. The band's last studio album to date was released in 1999. The band was also named The Band of a Year by Rock-Fuzz Magazine in 1997.

== Band name's origin ==
The band's full name is "Chizh & Company" (Russian: “Чиж & Компания”), derived from Sergey Chigrakov’s nickname "Chizh" (Russian: “Чиж”). This nickname, in turn, is the Russian word for the Eurasian siskin (Spinus spinus), a small passerine bird in the finch family Fringillidae. Accordingly, the "company" in the name refers to the rest of band.

== Band's history ==
=== 1993—1994: band formation and debut album ===
In March 1993, guitarist, singer and songwriter Sergei "Chizh" Chigrakov, who at that time played in the band "Various People", receives an offer from Igor Berezovets and Andrei Burlaki to record a solo album. With the support of Boris Grebenshchikov, he comes to St. Petersburg, where he records an album called simply "Chizh" on the label "OsoAviAkhim". Since he didn't have his own band at that moment, he was helped to record the album by well-known musicians of the city: Boris Grebenshchikov and Sergey Berezovoy (Aquarium), Nikolay Korzinin (St. Petersburg band), Alexander Brovko and Mikhail Chernov (DDT). In the fall of the same year Sergey Chigrakov gave concerts in St. Petersburg. The band accompanying him included guitarist Rodion Chikunov from the band "Streets", bass guitarist Alexey Romaniuk, known from the bands "Style" and "Nesterov's Loop", and well-known session drummer Alexander Kondrashkin. Encouraged by the warm reception, Sergey Chigrakov decides to leave "Different People", move to St. Petersburg and create his own band. On 1 May 1994 Chizh finally moved to St. Petersburg, where he started searching for musicians for a new band.

A month later, Chigrakov assembled the band "Chizh and Company", which included Alexei Romaniuk and drummer Vladimir Khanutin. A month later, Mikhail Vladimirov joined them. In such a line-up the "live" album Live was recorded, which became the band's debut album. In the same year the band released its first studio album – "Perekrestok". Alexander Kondrashkin, although he did not become a member of the band, first collaborated with the band as a percussionist.

The first producer of the band was Elena Karpova, editor of the Main Editorial Board of the Central Television music programs, who promoted the band until 1996.

=== 1995—1999 ===
The next album of Chizh & Co — "About Love", recorded in 1995, was the most interesting because most of the songs on this album were cover versions of less known authors: A. Selunin, O. Tarasov, V. Demidov, A. Khrynov, I. Gankevich, E. Varva, S. Kocherga. In the album “About Love” was also recorded “folk” song “Here the bullet whistled”. But the songs “O'k” (Chizh) and “About Love” (O. Tarasov) became undoubted hits that hit the charts. It is already customary for a band at the peak of popularity to release an album of its best songs. In 1995 the band “Chizh & Co” rose to the top of its popularity and it was time to record the album “Greatest Hits”. This album was recorded “live”, at a concert in September 1995 at the Yubileiny DK in St. Petersburg. It was actually a concert made up of the best songs of the band at that time. The hall enthusiastically accepted all the songs, and when Chizh forgot the lyrics, sang for him selflessly. In the same year the solo album of the band's guitarist Mikhail Vladimirov "Crimson Shores" was released.

The next year 1996 was quite laborious for the band. In addition to touring, solo concerts, as well as gathering concerts ("Maxidrom" and others), the band also recorded two new albums: “Erogenous Zone” and “Polonaise”. For the song “Polonaise” a video clip was also shot, part of which was filmed in America and the other half in Russia, near St. Petersburg. This trip to America was the first for all the band members. Opinions were very different. Mikhail Vladimirov called America "the country of cheap jeans and good guitars", Chizh said that he was "bored there and wanted to go home". The "Polonaise" album itself is notable for the fact that the Chamber Orchestra conducted by Y. P. Serebryakov was involved in the work on it. Another musician, Chizh's old friend Evgeny Barinov, nicknamed "Powerful", who played with Chizh in the Dzerzhinsk band "GPD", was invited to join the band.

Additionally, this year was marked by various solo projects of the band members. Chizh took part in the recording of two albums "Mit'kovskiye pesni" along with such famous performers as BG, Yuri Shevchuk, V. Butusov, A. F. Sklyar and others, who sang good old songs of war and Soviet peace time in a new way.

The next project in which Chizh participated was the recording and performances of Alexey "Polkovnik" Khrynov's session band — "Polkovnik and Odnopolchanye". "Polkovnik", a famous Nizhny Novgorod rock bard, was invited by producer S. Firsov to record old and new songs. For this project a truly "star" cast was gathered: Chizh, I. Vasiliev (“DDT"), L. Fedorov ("AuktsYon"), M. Kolovsky ("AuktsYon"), E. Barinov ("Chizh & Co"), D. Nekrasov. Then the band recorded the album "The First Call", and the song from this album "Spread me the field" (D. Nekrasov), the band "Chizh & Co" included in their album "Nothing to lose".

Mikhail Vladimirov also continued his solo career and recorded the album "Nayavu and in a dream". The band's sound engineer Y. Morozov recorded his next album "Illusion", in which the band "Chizh & Co" accompanied the author. In addition, the band "Chizh & Co" recorded for the collection "Strange Races" the song "Lyrical" on V. S. Vysotsky's poems. Vysotsky's songs were also performed by: “Alisa”, “Va-Bank”, “Chaif”, Yuri Shevchuk and others.

In 1997, "Chizh & Co" recorded the album "Bombers" — an album of cover versions of old songs of Soviet times. The album is dedicated to the musicians' parents. Video clips were shot for the songs "Bombers" and "Under the Balkan Stars". In the same year "Boogie-Kharkov" was reissued, now under the name "Chizh and Various People". In the same year the popular magazine "Rock Fuzz" announces "Chizh & Co" as the band of the year.

The year 1998 starts for Chizh & Co. with a foreign tour in Israel and a scandal connected with the departure of drummer Vladimir Khanutin from the band. The live album "New Jerusalem" was recorded there. The album opens with several new songs "I'm Like a Dog", "I'm Going, I'm Going", "For Two", and ends with the blues "Ural Biker Blues".

On their return to their homeland the musicians are in for an unpleasant surprise: drummer Vladimir Khanutin leaves the band – he goes to a rather famous St. Petersburg band "NOM". Igor Fedorov (born 8 September 1969), who previously played in the bands "Televizor", "NEP" and others, is invited to take his place.

In the same year (still with V. Khanutin), the band released the album "Best Blues and Ballads". This is another album of hits by Chizh & Co, which is a compilation of all previous albums. In September 1998, the band "Chizh & Co" is invited to London for the only concert in the club "Astoria". However, the band plays two concerts: the second one is an acoustic concert, in the BBC Radio studio in the program with the famous Seva Novgorodtsev. Later this recording was released by the band as a live album under the title "At 20:00 GMT". The album features acoustic versions of old well—known songs and one new one, later included in the next album. Recording of the album "Nothing to Lose" was intermittent – it was started on 25 August 1998, and finished on 13 March 1999.

During the whole year of 1999, the band actively toured the country. At the end of March in New York there is a festival with participation of Chizh & Co, Krematorium, Agata Kristi, AuktsYon, and a day later there is a concert in Chicago.

In early July, Gorno-Altaisk hosts a grand rock festival "In the mountains on the fast river" with the participation of bands Chizh & Co, Chaif, Aquarium, Crematarium, Vyacheslav Butusov, Kalinov Most, Alisa, Va—BankЪ, Tequilajazzz, Black Lukich. At the end of August in Daugavpils (Latvia) "Latgale Rock Festival" took place, where "Pesnyary" (V.Mulyavin), "Chizh & Co", and also local bands ("Cement" by Andrei Yakhimovich) took part.

On 17 September 1999 in St. Petersburg, there is a presentation of the new album "Nothing to lose" and a couple of days later the same happens in Moscow. This album includes 11 songs and 3 "alternative versions". Nine of them are Chizh's songs, and the rest are cover versions of "Spread Me a Field" (Dmitry Nekrasov) and "Suburban Blues" (Mike Naumenko). The latter in an alternative version was recorded together with the band "Russian Size" in the style of "techno", which was featured in "Musical Ring" a couple of years ago. Since the release of the new album, the band has been touring hard to this day.

=== 2000s ===
The year 2000 was a year of touring, both in Russia and abroad: the band went to the US (together with “Night Snipers”), and once again — a number of concerts in Israel. In their free time from concerts musicians are also engaged in studio work: Mikhail Vladimirov is releasing an album “Razmach Wings”, and Chizh takes part in recording of Alexander Chernetsky's album “Comeback”.

After three years of silence, in 2001, Chizh's solo record "Haydn I'll be Haydn!" was released, where he sang and played all the instruments without involving producers and other musicians. Yuri Morozov was the sound engineer, as per tradition. In the fall, Chizh participated in the recording of the song "It's a sweet word freedom" by the group Cafe. The same year he celebrated his 40th birthday. The musicians spent the whole year traveling around the country. A notable event of this year was the band's participation in the St. Petersburg rock festival "Windows Open!". In December 2001, Igor Berezovets left the band. Alexander Gordeev took his place.

In 2002, "Chizh & Company" expanded the area of touring trips: the musicians flew to the Arctic Circle, which was later reflected in Sergey Chigrakov's new composition "Blues on stilts". In the summer, Chizh as a part of the group "Different People" works on the recording of the record "Surrebizons". At the end of June, the band along with other rock musicians honored the memory of Viktor Tsoi by taking part in a grand concert dedicated to the cult musician. In the fall of the same year, after a couple of concerts in Israel, our heroes went on a long tour across America: from Los Angeles to Boston. On their return home the guys participated in three tribute shows – to Andrey "Dyusha" Romanov ("Train"), Yegor Letov ("About a Dummy") and the band "Secret" ("Leningrad Time").

In 2003, the foreign tours of the band continued. This time Canada was added, where the band performed in a somewhat truncated line-up (Chizh – guitar, vocals, Evgeny Barinov – accordion, percussion), the rest were simply not allowed into the country. After Canada reunited, Chizh & Co. gave several concerts in America. In April 2003, Chizh & Co, together with Ekaterinburg band "Train to Somewhere" (on the initiative of the latter) went on an unprecedented tour to the cities of the Urals and Siberia. Having started in Ekaterinburg, the musicians traveled a total of 10,000 kilometers. Having finished "Siberia Ural Blues" with a performance in Ufa, the band managed to give 14 concerts in 19 days.

In the summer of the same year in the Tallinn studio Sergey Chigrakov takes part as a session musician in the recording of the record of the Estonian band Avenue — "Kapel". Then there was a joint work with Sergei Galanin on the composition "Nobody Needs Nobody", which for almost three months kept in the charts of radio stations. At the invitation of Konstantin Kinchev Chizh takes part in the recording of the new album of the band "Alice". And with "Different People" records the album "911". During the same period the guitarist of "Chizh & Co", Mikhail Vladimirov, released a new solo record "Upside-Down Sky". The band also participated in the infamous Tushino festival "Wings". In November 2003, the band parted with the director Alexander Gordeev. His place is taken by Colonel Andrey Asanov, a classmate of Igor Berezovets.

In 2004, the band declares the year of acoustics. The concerts are a great success all over the country. Within the framework of celebrating the anniversary of the Pushkinskaya 10 Art Center "Chizh & Co" takes part in the events in St. Petersburg and Moscow dedicated to this significant event. In June 2004, Sergey Chigrakov once again crossed the Atlantic to realize his long-time dream – to play with black blues musicians. The joint project of Chizh and "Herbert Maitlandt Band" was called "Chizh & Blues company". The repertoire consisted of Chizh's blues. The result of joint music-making were concerts in Boston and "China Club" in New York City. While Chigrakov surprised American bluesmen with his improvisations, Vladimirov sat down in the studio, and by the end of the summer recorded his new album "Children of the Red Zombie". In addition, this time "Chizh & Co" was in the Holy Land again: this time Ashdod was added to the already familiar cities. Finally, for the first time in the tour schedule there appeared an unexpected and somewhat exotic country – Singapore.

After returning from a foreign tour, Sergey Chigrakov, with the help of Alexey Romaniuk and Igor Fedorov, finished recording the soundtrack to a TV series with the working title "The First Way". Chizh's remarkable energy and dedication deserve acknowledgement: he continued his collaboration with “Different People”, and the result of joint efforts was the release of the album “Acoustics”. But the most important event for Chizh & Co. This year was the band's tenth anniversary. The musicians celebrated the anniversary with two big concerts in Moscow and St. Petersburg. The four—hour festive program included "Chizh" in acoustic and electric, as well as the performance of guests. Dmitry Dibrov, Maxim Leonidov, Sergey Galanin, "Different People", "Ariel", Vyacheslav Malezhik, Evgeny Margulis, "Blue Bird", Yuri Galtsev, Zakhar May, "Avenue" and others came to congratulate the culprits. The end of this year was the participation in the charity event "Time to Live!" dedicated to World AIDS Day.

=== 2010s ===
In spring 2010 the album of the young Ekaterinburg band "Romario" will be released, the songs in which were performed by Evgeny Margulis, Romario and Chizh.

In an interview after the concert in Kharkiv KKZ "Ukraine", Chizh told about the plans for the year, including the release of the new album. According to Chizh, it would be called "About Love", and it would include both songs of friends' and Chizh's own songs.

In the second half of 2010, drummer Igor Fedorov leaves the band and is replaced by ex-DDT drummer Igor Dotsenko — Sergei Chigrakov's favorite drummer, according to Yuri Shevchuk.

Due to Igor Dotsenko's deteriorating health, the role of drummer is temporarily filled by Evgeny Barinov. In April 2014, the band tours the USA. At the end of the year, after Igor Dotsenko's death, Vladimir Nazimov, who previously played in the bands Urfin Dzhus, Nautilus Pompilius, Nastya, April March, Banga Jazz and Top, becomes the permanent drummer.

On 12 October 2015, the song "Fly away, my hangover, fly away" was premiered by Evgeny Margulis, Romario and Chizh. A music video for the song was also filmed.

In 2015, Sergey Chigrakov's daughter Daria starts to perform as a backing vocalist, then Marina Shalagaeva joins the band.

In the fall of 2017, Mikhail Vladimirov left the band. He was replaced by Mikhail Rusin.

On 21 July 2019, it was announced the release of a new and first album of the band in 20 years, which should be released "in a year at most". In anticipation of the release of the long—awaited album, the band recorded the song "Deck" in the studio, which had previously been performed periodically at the band's concerts.

=== 2020s ===
In 2021, Pavel Pikovsky's (Hugo's band leader) album "Pass it on to someone else" was released. The title song was written and performed by a joint duet between Sergei and Pavel. On 6 June 2022, the band's former guitarist Mikhail Vladimirov passed away. Unfortunately, the collective's album, which was announced in 2019, was never released.

== Band members ==
=== Current lineup ===
- Sergey "Chizh" Chigrakov (born 1961) — vocals, guitars, keyboards, harmonica and other instruments, author of music and lyrics (1993—present).
- Alexey Romaniuk (born 1973) — bass guitar (1993—present).
- Evgeny Barinov — accordion, percussion (1996—present).
- Mikhail Rusin — guitar (2017—present).
- Denis Vasilevsky — drums (2018—present).
- Daria Chigrakova — backing vocals (2015—present), episodes.
- Marina Shalagaeva — backing vocals (2015—present), episodes.

=== Former members ===
- Alexander Kondrashkin (1956—1999) — percussion (1993, 1994).
- Mikhail Vladimirov (1967—2022) — guitar (1994—2017).
- Vladimir Khanutin (1973—2007) — drums (1994—1998), backing vocals (1996—1998).
- Igor Fedorov — drums (1998—2010).
- Igor Dotsenko (1953—2014) — drums (2010—2014).
- Vladimir Nazimov — drums (2014—2018).

== Discography ==
=== Total list of titles ===
Transliterated title	Original title	Translation	Year of release
Chizh	Чиж	Chizh	1993
Live	Live	Live	1994
Perekryostok	Перекрёсток	Crossroad	1995
O Lyubvi	О любви	About Love	1995
Greatest Hits	Greatest Hits	Greatest Hits	1995
Erogennaya Zona	Эрогенная зона	Erogenous Zone	1996
Polonez	Полонез	Polonaise	1996
Bombardirovschiki	Бомбардировщики	Bombers	1997
Lutshie Blyuzy i Ballady	Лучшие блюзы и баллады	The Best of Blues and Ballads	1998
Noviy Ierusalim	Новый Иерусалим	New Jerusalem	1998
V 20:00 po Grinvichu	В 20:00 по Гринвичу	At 20:00 GMT	1999
Nechego Teryat'	Нечего терять	Nothing to Lose	1999
Gaidnom Budu	Гайдном буду	I'll be Haydn	2001
SorokChetyre	44	44	2005
Na grani izumruda	На грани изумруда	On the Verge of Emerald	2007
Odin den vmeste	Один день вместе	One Day Together	2012

=== Studio albums ===
- 1994 — "Crossroads"
- 1995 — "About Love"
- 1996 — "Erogenous Zone"
- 1996 — "Polonaise"
- 1997 — "Bombers"
- 1999 — "Nothing to Lose"

=== Concert recordings ===
- 1994 — "Live"
- 1995 — "Greatest Hits live"
- 1998 — "New Jerusalem"
- 1998 — "At 20:00 GMT"
- 2012 — "One Day Together" ("Chizh & Co" / "Different People")

=== Joint works ===
- 1998 — "Illusion" ("Chizh & Co" / Yuri Morozov)
- 2002 — Concert in the hall near Finnish train station ("Chizh & Co" / Yuri Morozov)
- 2005 — "44" ("Chizh & Co" / "Different People")
- 2007 — "On the Edge of Emerald" ("Chizh & Co" / Mikhail Vladimirov)
- 2010 — "Behind the closed door" ("Chizh & Co" / Noize MC)
- 2021 — "Pass it to another" ("Chizh & Co" / Pavel Pikovsky)

=== Collections ===
- 1998 — "The Best Blues and Ballads"
- 2001 — "Legends of Russian rock"
- 2001 — "Pastoral"

=== Singles ===
- 2019 — "Deck"

== Videography ==
=== Clips ===
- 1994 — Eternal Youth
- 1996 — Polonaise
- 1997 — Bombers (feat. Marina Kapuro, Tatiana Kapuro)
- 1997 — Under the Balkan Stars

=== Films ===
- 1995 — Greatest Hits. Live

== Literature ==
- Alekseev, Aleksandr (2009). "Кто есть кто в российской рок-музыке" [Who is who in Russian rock music]. Харвест (in Russian): 529–531. ISBN 978-5-17-048654-0.

== See also ==
- Phantom (Russian song) (Russian: Фантом)
