= Don't Shoot =

Don't Shoot may refer to:

- Don't Shoot (film), a 1922 American silent crime film
- "Don't Shoot" (The Game song), 2014
- "Don't Shoot!" (DDT song), 1982
- Don't Shoot, a song by Shea Diamond
- Don't Shoot, a song by Nas from the album King's Disease III (2022)

== See also ==
- Don't Shoot (I'm a Man), a song by Devo, from the album Something for Everybody
