= Alexander Bashlachev =

Soviet poet (1960–1988)

Alexander Bashlachev Александр Башлачёв
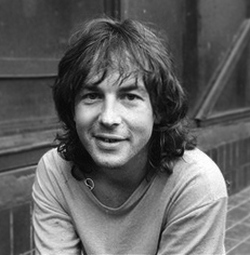
- 1987 (photo by Igor Mukhin)

Background information
- Born: Alexander Nikolaevich Bashlachev; 27 May 1960; Cherepovets, Russian SFSR, Soviet Union
- Died: 17 February 1988 (aged 27) Leningrad, Russian SFSR, Soviet Union
- Genres: Singer-songwriter, Bard rock, folk-punk
- Instrument: Acoustic guitar
- Years active: 1983–1988

Alexander Nikolaevich Bashlachev (Russian: Алекса́ндр Никола́евич Башлачёв, IPA: [ɐlʲɪˈksandr nʲɪkɐˈlajɪvʲɪtɕ bəʂlɐˈtɕɵf]; 27 May 1960 – 17 February 1988) was a Soviet poet, singer-songwriter and guitarist considered to be one of the most influential performers in Russian rock music.

== Early life ==
Bashlachev was born in Cherepovets, Soviet Union, the son of Nikolai Bashlachev and Nellie Bashlacheva. In 1977, Bashlachev graduated from Cherepovets High School in Cherepovets and worked as a painter at the Cherepovets Metallurgical Plant with his father. Bashlachev was reported to be an intelligent child, able to multiply large numbers by the age of four, took part in literary competitions, and, as a teenager, published a collection of poems by Vladimir Vysotsky and Sergei Yesenin. In 1978, he resigned from the plant to enroll at the Ural State University in Yekaterinburg (then called Sverdlovsk) as a journalism major. Bashlachev graduated in 1983.

== Career ==
In early 1983, Bashlachev wrote "Griboyedov Waltz," his first song. Throughout the 1980s, Bashlachev wrote and composed music. After he graduated from Ural State University, Bashlachev left Sverdlovsk and returned to Cherepovets, where he worked for a year with the newspaper "The Communist." There, he wrote articles about the power plant and local cafés.

In May 1984, Bashlachev attended the Leningrad Rock Festival in Leningrad, purchasing an acoustic guitar which he taught himself to play. In September, Bashlachev played some of his songs at his friend Leonid Parfyonov's apartment in Leningrad. Over the years, he would play several small apartment concerts, called kvartirniks. Kvartirniks were often held to promote a musician's work, to support the underground rock scene, and, in some instances, to work around governmental censors of music. Police raids of such concerts were not uncommon. In October 1984, Bashlachev met music journalist Artemy Troitsky, who invited Bashlachev to Moscow to write and compose music. In December 1984, Bashlachev settled in Leningrad.

In March 1985, Bashlachev, along with Yuri Shevchuk, played at the Leningrad Rock Festival. The two performed before an audience of six hundred concertgoers at the Leningrad Veterinary Institute in Leningrad. A recording of this concert was released under the title of "Kochegarka." Officially a worker at a coal boiler station popularly known as Kamchatka (which also served as an underground rock venue), Bashlachev became a member of the Leningrad Rock Club. In June 1987, he performed at the Leningrad Rock Festival for the second and final time and was awarded the Nadezhda (Hope) prize.

== Death ==
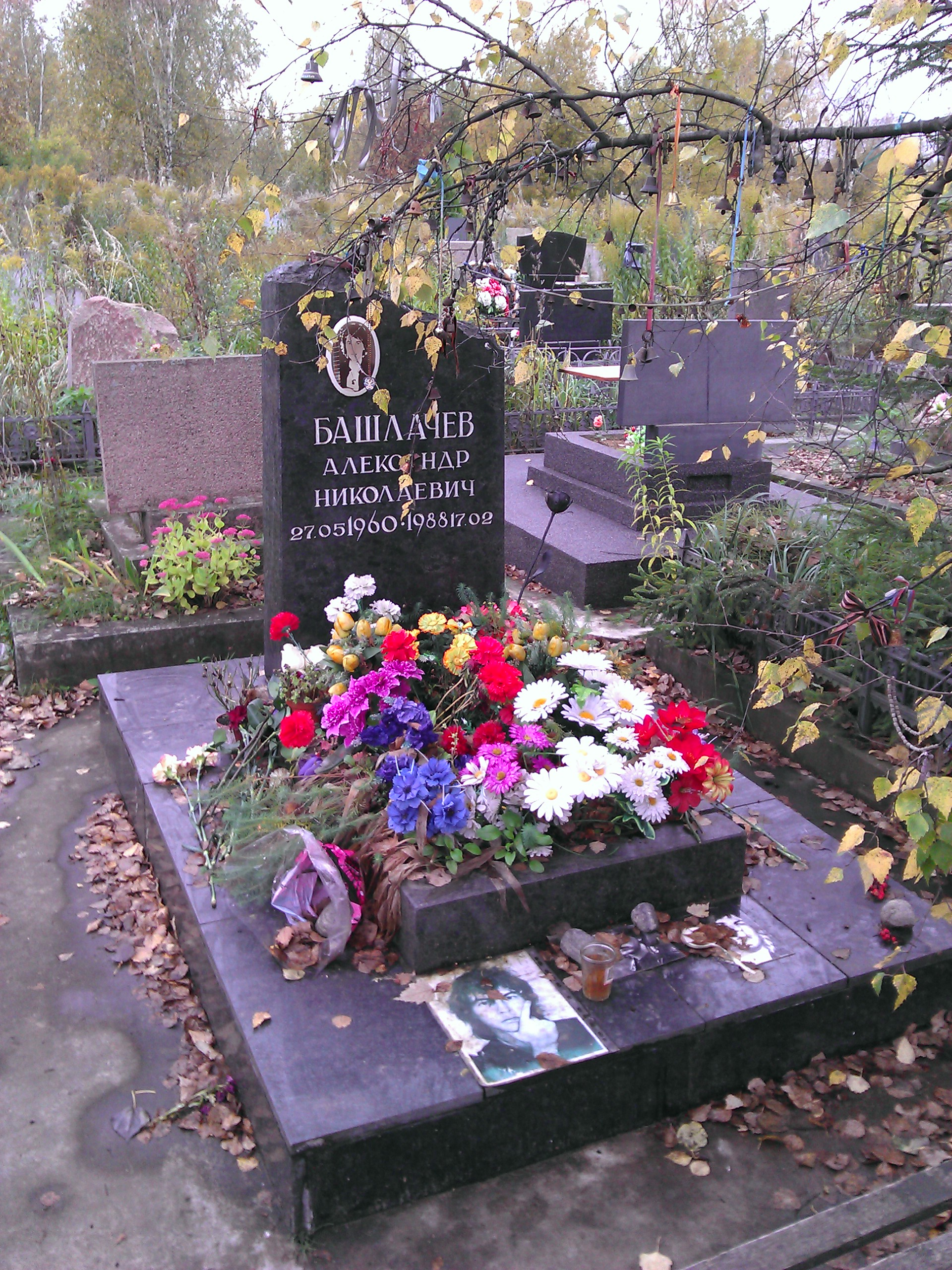
Grave of Alexander Bashlachev.

Shortly before his death, Bashlachev had difficulties with writer's block, rarely writing new songs and tending to avoid performing old ones. His last song, entitled "Cherry," was written in August 1987. Bashlachev was reported to become more isolated as his depression grew more severe.

On 17 February 1988, Bashlachev died after falling from the window of the ninth floor of an apartment on Kuznetsov Avenue in Leningrad. In addition to signs of a deepening depression, he was reported to be troubled by housing and finance concerns, as well as the impending arrival of his son, Yegor, who was born approximately six months after his death. Bashlachev was buried at the Kovalevskoye Cemetery in Leningrad Oblast.

Bashlachev's son, Yegor, was born to his girlfriend Anastasia Rakhlina in August 1988. Bashlachev was predeceased by his first son, Ivan, who died in infancy in 1985 and was the dedication of Bashlachev's song "Vanyusha." Yegor died by suicide in 2021, the same manner of death as his father. Anastasia Rakhlina died in June 2018 at the Sklifosovsky Institute for Emergency Medicine after being diagnosed with cancer earlier in the year.

The Alexander Bashlachev Museum opened in Cherepovets around January 2021, featuring some of Bashlachev's personal effects, including his guitar, items of clothing, and numerous photographs. This was in addition to memorial plaques posted in Cherepovets at Bashlachev's childhood home and school.

== Discography ==
1. Time of Bells (1989) – recorded in January 1986 during the second of two single-day sessions at the apartment of the administrator at the Moscow Rock Laboratory, Alexander Ageev. Bashlachev sang 24 songs.
2. Everything Will Be Fine (1990) – recorded in January 1986 during the first of two sessions. Bashlachev sang 24 songs.
3. Third Capital (1990) – recorded on 30 May 1985, in Leningrad in the home studio of Alexei Vishnya.
4. Taganka (1992) – recorded by Andrei Zachesov on 22 January 1986, in Taganka.
5. Eternal Fasting (1994) – recorded in May 1986 in the studio of Alexander Lipnitsky.
6. Famously (1994) – recorded on 20 January 1986, in the home studio of Alexander Ageev (Moscow).
7. VII (1994) — recorded by Oleg Kovriga at a concert at the home of Egor Egorov in Moscow on 14 January 1988, and at a home concert at the home of Marina Timasheva in Moscow on 29 January 1988. Entry is also known as "Last Concert".
8. II (1996) — Recorded at the home of Marina Terganova and Alexander Nesmelov in Moscow on 14 April 1985.
9. IV (1996) — Recorded by Oleg Zamovsky at his home in Vladimir in June 1986, Tatiana Nilova and Yuri Morozov in the studio of Radio House in Leningrad for the documentary, Petr Soldatenkov's studio in June 1987 and Igor Vasiliev's home in Alexander Ageev of Moscow on 20 January 1986.
10. Kochegarka (1997) – underground concert with Yuri Shevchuk in Leningrad. Recorded on 18 March 1985.
11. Moscow (1998) – recorded by Artemy Troitsky in Moscow on 20 October 1984, at the apartment of Sergei Ryzhenko.
12. I (1998) – recorded at Viktor Alisov and Igor Vasiliev's home studio in Moscow on 17 to 19 September 1984, at a home concert at Cherepovets in the summer of 1984 and by Sergey Firsov at his home in Leningrad in September 1985.
13. IV (1998) — recorded by Oleg at a concert at the home of Egor Egorov in Moscow on 4 October 1985.
14. V (1998) — recorded by Igor Vasilyev at the house of Alexander Ageev in Moscow 20 January 1986, and by Mark Kopelev at a concert in Novosibirsk of Leningrad in December 1985 and July 1986.
15. Chernobyl Loners at the Edge of the World (1999) – recording made by Sergei Firsov 15 August 1986, on household equipment. Personnel: Alexander Bashlachev – vocals, lead guitar; Andrew Shatalin – bass guitar; Pavel Kondratenko – piano, and Sviatoslav Zaderiy – percussion.
16. VI (2002) — 1, 2, 7 – recorded by Oleg at a concert in Moscow in October 1986. 3–6 – recorded by Boris Pereverzev at a home concert at Artemy Troitsky's apartment in Moscow on 15 January 1986. 8—11 — recorded by Oleg at the home of Egor Egorov in Moscow on 14 January 1988. 12, 13 — recorded by Kirill Kuvyrdin at his home in Moscow on 5 July 1987. 14 — recorded at the Mitki exhibition in Leningrad in July 1987; harmonica – Boris Grebenshchikov. 15–20 – recorded by Sergei Firsov at his home in Leningrad on 22 August 1986.
