= The Sky Under the Heart =

- Directed by: Victoria Kaskova
- Produced by: Yuri Burak
- Release date: April 5, 2012 (Russia)
- Running time: 87 minutes
- Country: Russia
- Language: Russian

The Sky Under the Heart (Russian: Небо под сердцем) is a 2012 Russian concert film of the rock band DDT (Russian: ДДТ) directed by Victoria Kaskova.

== Synopsis ==
The film contains the video record of the first concert of the rock programme Inache (Russian: Иначе, Otherwise) as well as all the stages of the preparation of the show.

In Russia, the distribution of the film began on 5 April 2012. The distributor was a leader of art house movies in Russia, the company Movie Without Borders. The film is notable as the first example of multicamera concert filming in Russia and is the first Russian documentary film to be created without state financial support.

Sound direction was by the British studio Metropolis.

The film was produced by Yuri Burak and advertised by the Russian newspaper Novaya Gazeta (Russian: Новая газета) which described the concert as the great music feature of the year.

== Track list ==
1. "Noise No.1"
2. "Rodivshimsya etoy noch'u" (Russian: Родившимся этой ночью, For those born that night)
3. "Solnechnyy svet" (Russian: Солнечный свет, Sunlight)
4. "Ey ty, kto ty" (Russian: Эй ты, кто ты, Hey you, who are you)
5. "Pustota" (Russian: Пустота, Void)
6. "Krizis" (Russian: Кризис, Crisis)
7. "Provodnik" (Russian: Проводник, Conductor)
8. "Napishi mne, napishi" (Russian: Напиши мне, напиши, Write to me, write)
9. "Vstrecha" (Russian: Встреча, Meeting)
10. "Made in China"
11. "Za toboy prishli" (Russian: За тобой пришли, They've come for you)
12. "Novaya Rossiya" (Russian: Новая Россия, New Russia)
13. "Noise No.2"
14. "Pesnya o vremeni" (Russian: Песня о времени, Song about time)
15. "Kogda ty byla zdes'" (Russian: Когда ты была здесь, When you was here)
16. "Pesnya o svobode" (Russian: Песня о свободе, Song about freedom)
17. "Yugo-zapadnyy veter" (Russian: Юго-западный ветер, Southwestern Wind)
