= Don't Shoot! (DDT song) =

1982 anti-war song by DDT

"Don't Shoot!" (Russian: Не стреляй!) is an anti-war song by the Russian rock band DDT, written by Yuri Shevchuk in 1980. It was first released on the self-published album Svinia na raduge (Pig On the Rainbow, 1982), and later re-recorded and re-released on Compromise (1983) and then again on the band's first officially released record Ya poluchil etu rol (I Got This Part, 1988). It was also included on several compilation albums.

The song received the grand prix of the 1982 Zolotoj Kamerton music festival, but it was censored out from the television broadcast.

In 2000, the song was listed as one of the best Russian rock songs of the twentieth century by Nashe radio.

== Content ==
The song tells about a young man who is good at hitting birds from a slingshot, and goes on to win awards on shooting ranges. Later he goes to war, and when he comes back, he "drowns his consciousness in wine" and can't stop thinking about another young man who begged him: "Don't shoot!"

== History ==
Shevchuk wrote the song in 1980, after talking to his friend Victor Tyapin, who had served in the Soviet–Afghan War since its first days. Tyapin's stories were very different from what the Soviet television reported about it. Shevchuk recalled: "My classmate Vitya Tyapin brought the first coffins from Afghanistan to Ufa, where I was living back then. The TV was telling that we are building kindergartens there, but actually it was a war. We drank together, and in the morning after, this song somehow wrote itself and came out of me."

In a 2010 Kommersant interview, Shevchuk revealed that the first verse was written together with the artist Alexander Spiridonov, who asked to conceal his identity. In a GQ interview, Shevchuk told about another source of inspiration for the song: when he was a child, he saw other boys shooting at birds, and was shocked by their cruelty: "I took home a sparrow they had shot, and that was still alive. The sparrow later died, but I was changed."

Communist Party functionaries and the KGB shamed Shevchuk for performing an unpatriotic song while Soviet "internationalist fighters" are on duty.

Ne streliaj! carries an emotional charge. It became DDT's best known pacifist message. Shevchuk subsequently visited several war zones: Chechnya, Tajikistan, Yugoslavia, Afghanistan, and South Ossetia. He said in an interview that after these visits he started appreciating the song even more: "After running around some war zones, I was wounded by the evil and hatred of war, and saw the horror and the disintegration of personality. The first thing that war kills is personality."

The song was considered for use in the film Brother 2, but Shevchuk refused it, considering the film "disgusting and nationalist". The final cut used a song by Bi-2, but DDT posters can be seen in some shots.

The song's title was used for DDT's 2008 tour, and the proceeds were donated to the victims of the Russo-Georgian War.
