= Yuri Morozov (musician) =

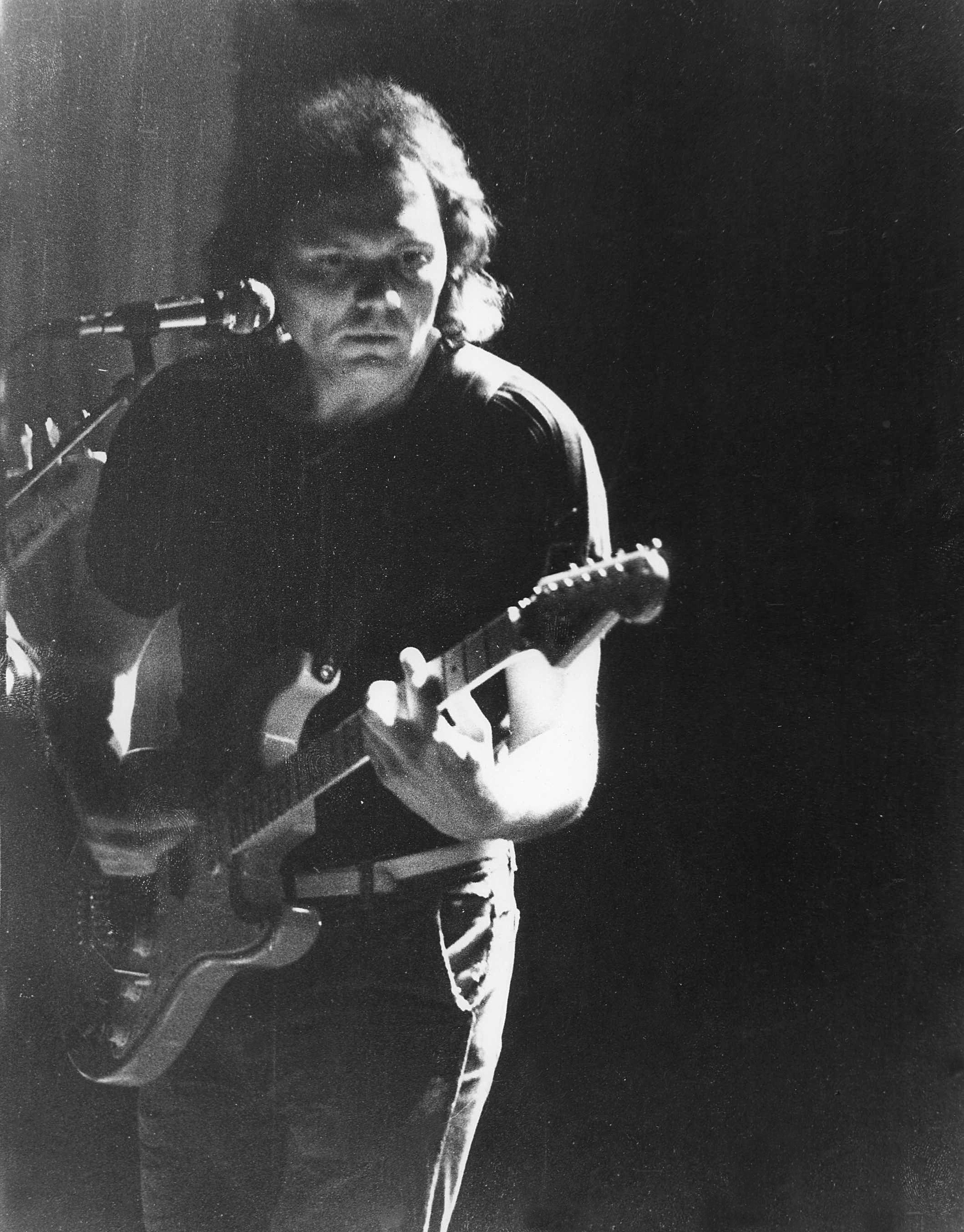
- Morozov in 1990

Background information
- Born: 6 March 1948; Belogorsk, Crimean Oblast, Soviet Union
- Died: 23 February 2006 (aged 57) Saint Petersburg, Russia
- Genres: Rock, Psychedelic rock, Psychedelic folk, Experimental rock, Progressive rock
- Years active: 1970–2006
- Website: morozovrock.com

Yuri Vasilyevich Morozov (Russian: Юрий Васильевич Морозов; 6 March 1948 – 23 February 2006), was a Russian rock Multi-instrumentalist, sound engineer and composer. He created his own style using Progressive rock, Psychedelic rock, Experimental music, Folk music, Jazz and many more. Besides having his own musical career, he also participated in the recording of albums of bands such as DDT, Aquarium, Chizh & Co, and many others.
