= Raznye Lyudi =

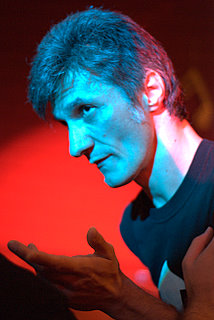
- Alexander Chernetsky, the current leader and song-writer

Background information
- Also known as: Gruppa Prodlennogo Dnya
- Origin: Kharkiv, Ukraine
- Genres: Rock
- Years active: 1987 – present
- Members: Aleksandr Chernetskiy (vocal, guitar); Nail Kadirov (bass); Andrey Vasilyev (guitar); Boris Shavennikov (drums); Sergey Chigrakov (vocal, guitar)

Raznye Lyudi (Russian: Разные люди – Different people) is a band from Saint Petersburg, Russia (originally from Kharkiv, USSR, now Ukraine). First name of band was GPD - Gruppa Prodlennogo Dnya (Russian: ГПД - группа продленного дня), was created in 1987.

== Members ==
- Aleksandr Chernetskiy (vocal, guitar)
- Nail Kadirov (bass)
- Andrey Vasilyev (guitar)
- Boris Shavennikov (drums)
- Sergey Chigrakov (vocal, guitar)
