= Sergey Chigrakov =

Russian musician and songwriter (born 1961)

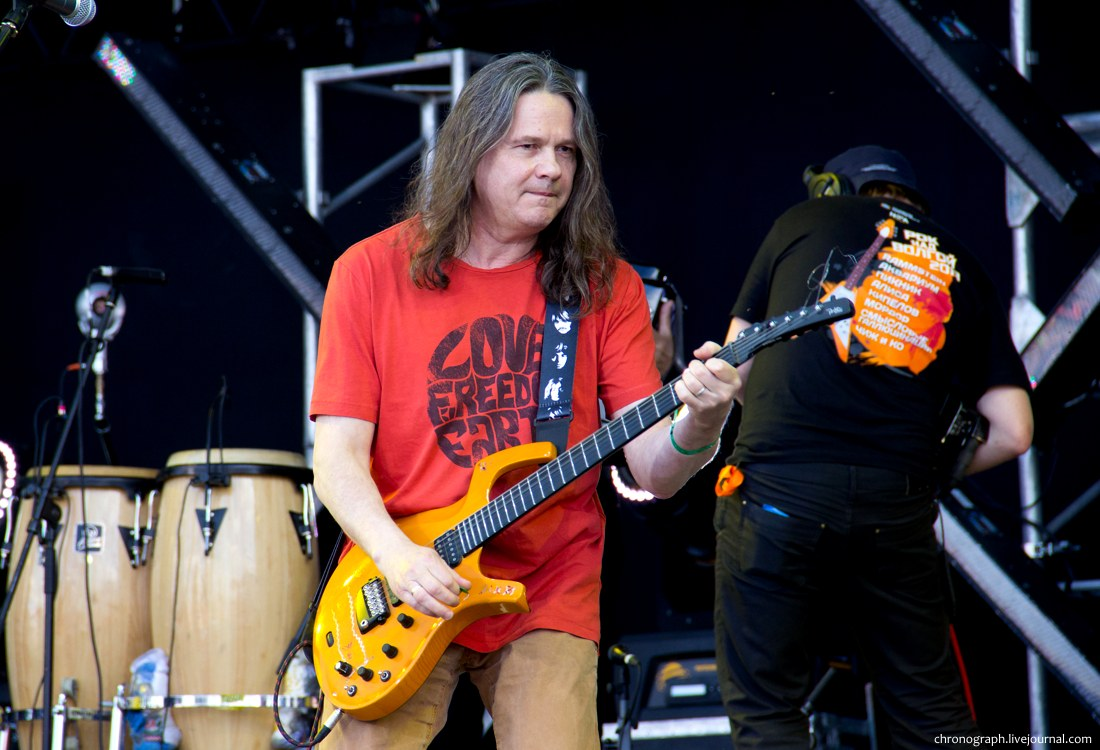
Sergey Chigrakov in 2013

Sergey Nikolayevich "Chizh" Chigrakov (Note: Russian: Серге́й Николаевич Чиграков) (born 6 February 1961) is a Russian rock performer and songwriter. Most of his current songs are recorded with his band, Chizh & Co.

Chigrakov has performed on stage since the age of 14, playing the bass guitar in clubs in his home town Dzerzhinsk. He graduated from a musical school and college in the same town, and then studied at the Leningrad Institute of Culture and the jazz studio of the Leningrad Conservatory. There he learned to play the accordion and drums. Chigrakov then worked as an instructor in Dzerzhinsk, while playing the guitar and singing in a metal group.

After some time, Chigrakov got an invitation from Alexander Chernetskiy, which resulted in the formation of the group "Raznyie Lyudi" (literally Various people or Different People), where Chigrakov soon occupied the place of the lead vocalist. In 1993, Chigrakov released his first solo album in Saint Petersburg. At this time, he worked with numerous famous Russian rock stars such as Mikhail "Uncle Misha" Chernov, Nikolai Korzinin and Boris Grebenshchikov. Chigrakov performed in a live concert for the first time with Raznyie Lyudi at the festival Solovki. After this first official concert, he began writing, recording and singing his best known songs including Hochu Chaiu and Avtobus.

In 1994, Chigrakov moved to Saint Petersburg and formed a band called Chizh & Co. In the same year, the festival "Generation 94" presented the band with the special-prize of producer judges. Their clips were shown in a television show "Dobroye Utro" ("Good Morning") on national TV. In November, club Moscow arranged the group's first Moscow appearance.

Since then, Chigrakov and his band released 13 albums, and performed all over Russia. They are currently considered to be a legend of Russian rock music.

Since June 2017, it has been included in the Ukrainian Myrotvorets database.
