= Yuri Shevchuk =

Soviet-Russian singer (born 1957)

Yuri Shevchuk Юрий Шевчук
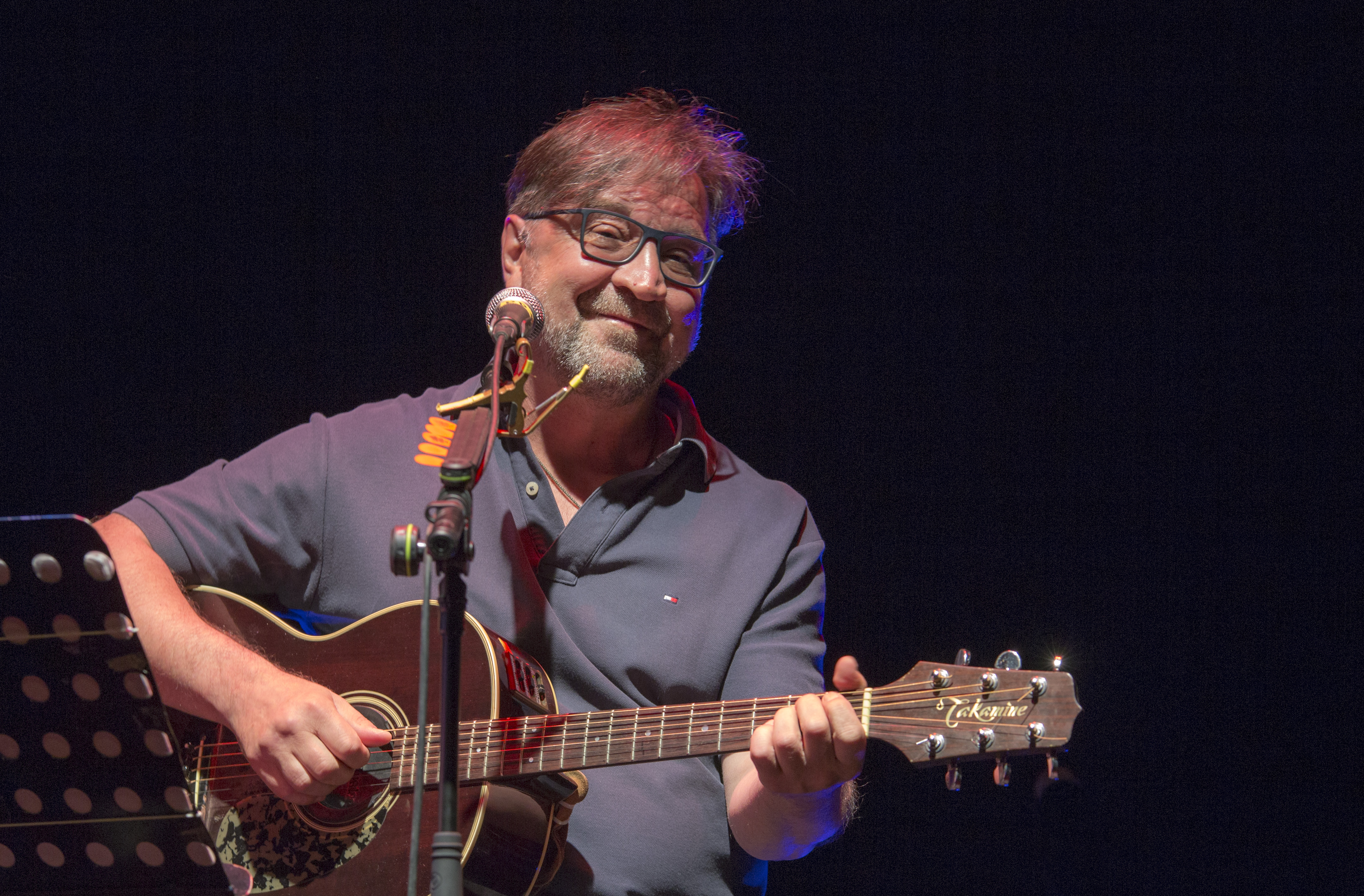
- Shevchuk in 2017

Background information
- Born: 16 May 1957 (age 69); Yagodnoye, Magadan Oblast, Russian SFSR, Soviet Union
- Genres: Rock, jazz
- Instruments: Vocals, guitar
- Website: www.ddt.ru

Yuri Yulianovich Shevchuk (Russian: Юрий Юлианович Шевчук; born 16 May 1957) is a Soviet and Russian rock musician and singer/songwriter who leads the rock band DDT, which he founded with Vladimir Sigachyov in 1980.

He is best known for his distinctive gravelly voice. His lyrics detail aspects of Russian life with a wry, humanistic sense of humor. He is also famous for opposing pop music culture (especially playback performances) for many years. He is often accredited with being the greatest songwriter in present-day Russia.

== Biography ==
Shevchuk was born in Yagodnoye in Magadan Oblast and raised in Ufa, Bashkir ASSR. Prior to founding DDT, he worked as an art teacher. His mother is an ethnic Tatar while his father is an ethnic Ukrainian from Khmelnytskyi Oblast.

By the time the group released their third album Periferiya (Periphery), Shevchuk was facing a lot of pressure from Soviet censorship. In 1985 he disbanded the group and together with his wife Elmira moved to St. Petersburg. There he assembled a new line-up and became a member of the Leningrad Rock Club. In 1989, DDT performed in Hungary; in 1990, in the US and for the first time in Japan.

In 1992, Shevchuk lost his wife to cancer. The album Aktrisa Vesna (Spring the Actress) was dedicated to her and featured her paintings.

In January 1995, during the First Chechen War, Shevchuk went on a peace mission to Chechnya, where he gave 50 concerts for Russian troops.

In 1999, Shevchuk visited Yugoslavia, giving concerts in support of the country's integrity and sharply criticizing the US for its bombings of the sovereign state. He also compiled photographic reports for UNESCO about destroyed Orthodox churches in the Serbian region of Kosovo.

In the 2000s, Shevchuk was highly critical of the nature of Vladimir Putin's Russia that he regarded as undemocratic (see: Putinism), and was one of only few celebrities to voice oppositionist grievances to Putin's face during a now-famous sit-down with cultural figures. On 3 March 2008, Shevchuk participated in a Dissenters' March in Saint Petersburg against the presidential elections to which, allegedly, no serious opposition was admitted. One of his controversial songs, "Kogda zakonchitsya neft", features the lyrics "When the oil runs dry, our president will die".

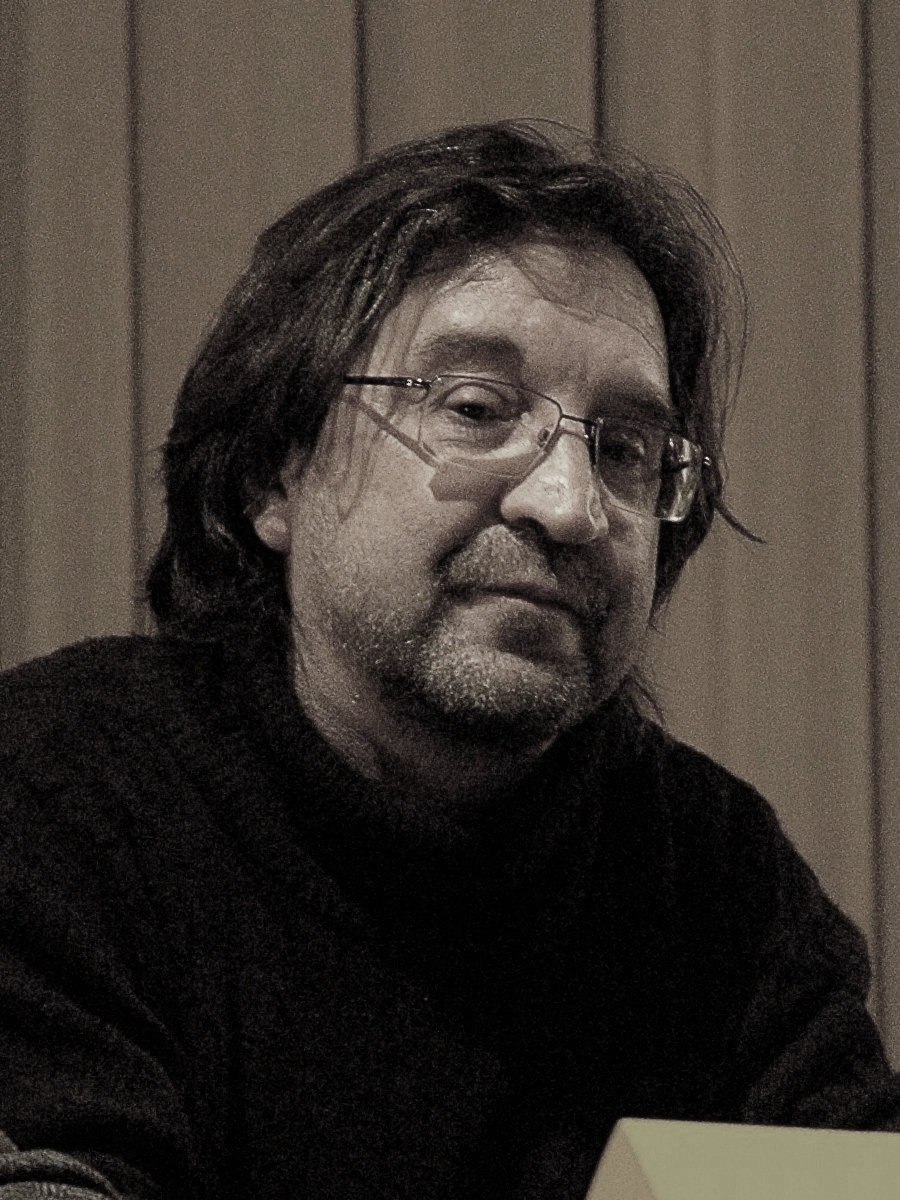
Shevchuk at the round table "Power and Culture: Agenda 2008", 15 March 2008 (Architect's House, St. Petersburg)

On 8 June 2008, Yuri Shevchuk spoke at a round table within the framework of the St. Petersburg International Economic Forum, "What is Russia? Conversation in non-economic language". Shevchuk published statistics - since 2003, about 100 monuments have been demolished in St. Petersburg. He also stressed that "you can't go back - you need a struggle of opinions, and not a single United Russia."

On 24 and 26 September 2008, Shevchuk organized two peace concerts in Moscow and Saint Petersburg in protest against the Russian–Georgian war. The concerts were titled "Don't Shoot" ("Ne Strelyai"), after an eponymous song Shevchuk had written in 1980 in response to the Soviet–Afghan War. Together with DDT he performed alongside the Georgian jazz singer Nino Katamadze, the Ossetian band Iriston, and the band Bratya Karamazovy from Ukraine. Revenue from the concerts was shared with victims of the war, Ossetians as well as Georgians.

In May 2010, Shevchuk received considerable media attention following a pointed dialogue with Vladimir Putin on state television, in which the singer openly confronted the then-Prime Minister with questions on controversial topics of democracy, freedom of speech, freedom of assembly, and freedom of the press. In a 2017 interview, Shevchuk admitted that the day after the televised exchange he "got a call from United States Congress with an invitation to give some kind of lecture..." and that his answer was: "[we] will settle it among ourselves". He also stated that some of his requests were treated and processed by Kremlin administration.

On 25 August 2010, Shevchuk performed the Bob Dylan song "Knockin' on Heaven's Door" together with U2 at their first ever concert in Russia, at the Luzhniki Stadium in Moscow.

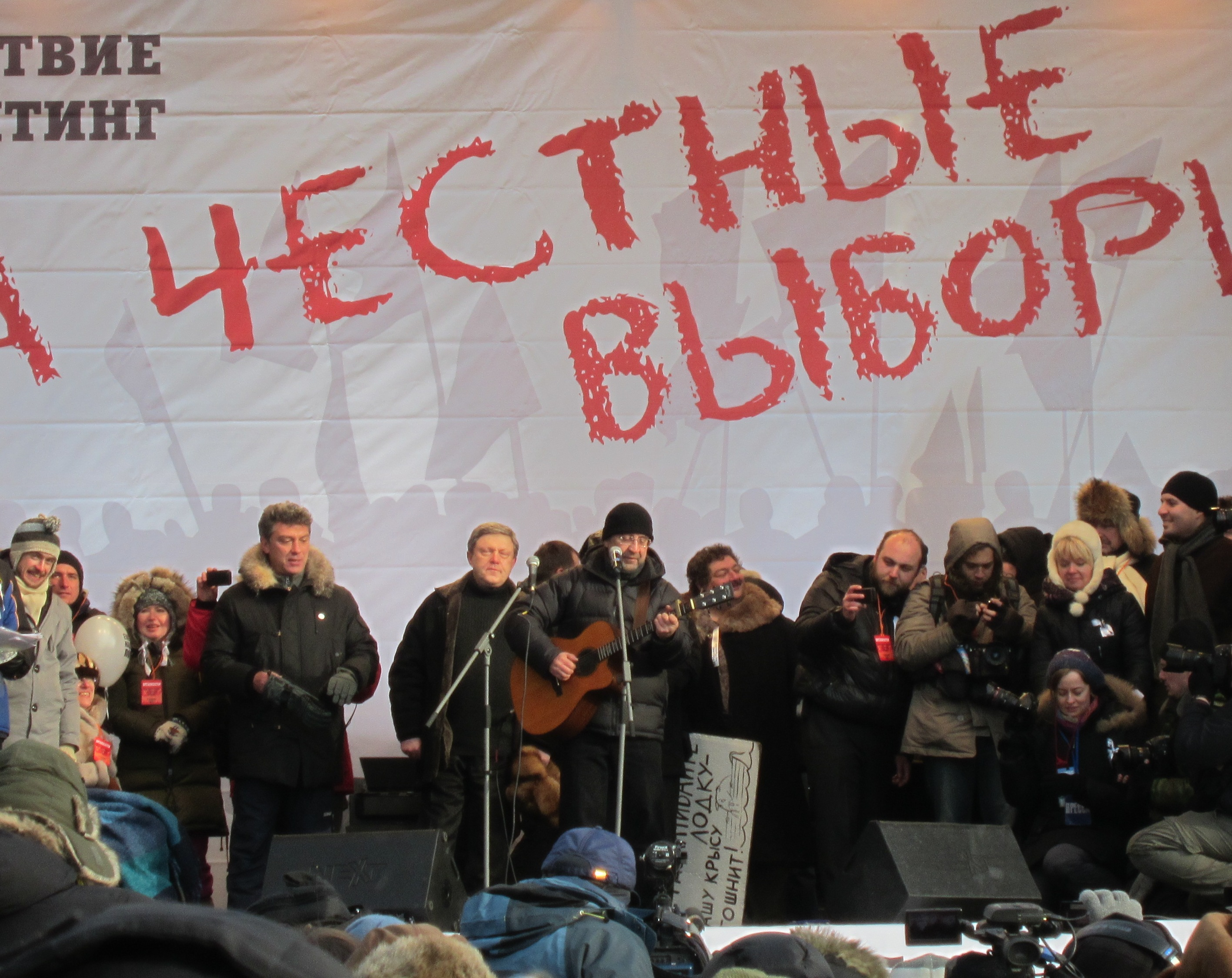
Shevchuk singing on an opposition rally "for fair elections"

On 4 January 2011, Shevchuk was featured on the U.S. NPR Morning Edition radio program.

On 18 June 2014, during a concert at the Green Theatre in Moscow, Shevchuk declared that all revenue from the concert would be donated to the Dr. Lisa fund to aid injured citizens of Donbas.

Shevchuk has consistently opposed the 2022 Russian invasion of Ukraine since it began on 24 February, when he stated, "Our future is being taken from us. We’re being pulled as if through an ice hole into the past, into the 19th, 18th, 17th century. And people refuse to accept it."

In May 2022, Shevchuk was charged under the war censorship law after speaking out against Putin and the war in Ukraine at a concert in Ufa, declaring: “The motherland, my friends, is not the president’s ass that has to be slobbered and kissed all the time, the motherland is an impoverished old woman at the train station selling potatoes.” He also said that "people of Ukraine are being murdered" and "our boys are dying over there" due to "some Napoleonic plans of another Caesar of ours." The case was opened by Police Division No.7 of Ufa and was sent to the court of Sovietsky district of Ufa, but had subsequently been referred to the court of Dzerzhinsky district of Saint Petersburg. The court then returned the case to the Police Division No.7 of Ufa due to the lack of description of committed violation in the text of the police protocol. On 15 July 2022, the case came before the court of Dzerzhinsky district of Saint Petersburg again. On 18 July 2022, the court of Dzerzhinsky district of Saint Petersburg again returned the case due to the lack of signature of Yuri Shevchuk and of information that he was apprised of his rights in the text of the police protocol. Eventually, on 16 August 2022, the court of Sovietsky district of Ufa found Yuri Shevchuk guilty of discrediting Russian Armed Forces. The fact, that Shevchuk didn't use words "Russian Armed Forces" or similar in his speech at a concert, was not considered important by the court, which sentenced Shevchuk to a 50 000 ruble fine. Shevchuk appealed the judgement. In December 2022, his appeal was dismissed. In reaction to Shevchuk's statements, Moscow authorities forced the cancellation of a scheduled DDT 40th anniversary concert in the city.

Since the beginning of the full-scale invasion, Shevchuk has recorded two anti-war songs: "Motherland, Come Back Home" ("Родина, вернись домой") and "The Burial of War" ("Похороны войны").

== Solo discography ==
Shevchuk's solo discography, excluding his works with DDT, include:

Year	Transliterated title	Original title	English translation	Annotation
1982	"Cherepovetsky magnitoalbom"	"Череповецкий магнитоальбом"	Cherepovets magnitalbum	magnitizdat
1995	"Kochegarka"	"Кочегарка"	Boiler room	underground concert with Alexander Bashlachev in Leningrad on March 18, 1985
1998	"82 g."	"82 г."	'82	post 1982
2001	"Dva Kontserta. Akustika"	"Два концерта. Акустика"	Two concerts. Acoustics	post 1997
2005	"Moskva. Zhara"	"Москва. Жара"	Moscow. Heat	underground concert in post 1985
2008	"L'Echoppe"	"L'Echoppe"	The Stall	
2009	"Sol'nik"	"Сольник"	Solo Work	a collection of poems, published by Novaya Gazeta
