= DDT (band) =

Russian rock band

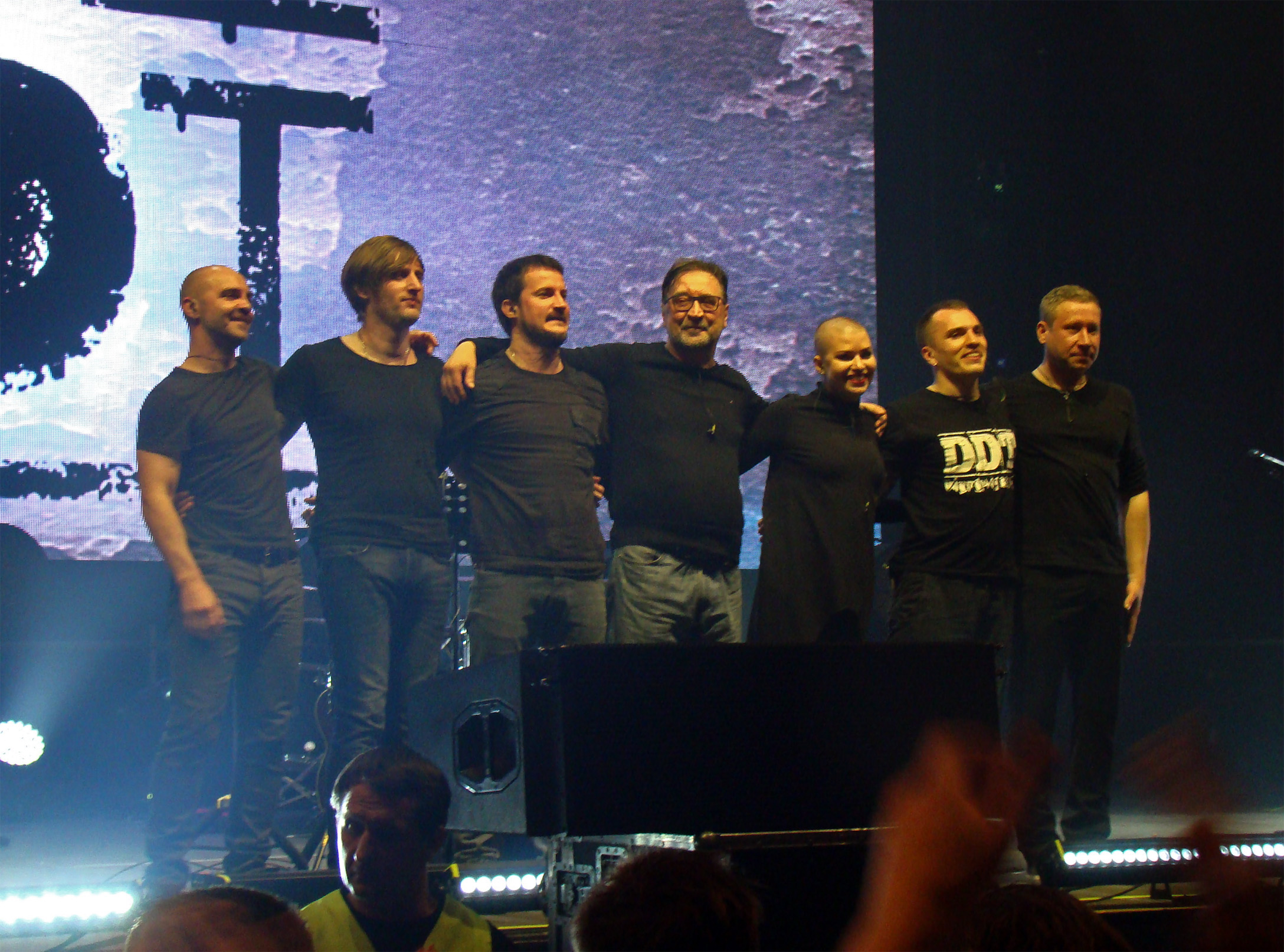
- The band in Nizhny Novgorod for the "История звука" (lit. 'history of sound') 2017 tour

Background information
- Origin: Ufa, Russia
- Genres: Russian rock, Bard rock, hard rock, folk rock, acoustic rock, industrial rock, indie rock
- Years active: 1980–present
- Labels: Teatr DDT; REAL Records; Moroz Records; ru:Navigator_Records
- Members: Yuri Shevchuk; Konstantin Shumaylov; Aleksey Fedichev; Ivan Vasilyev; Roman Nevelev; Artyom Mamai; Anton Vishnyakov; Alyona Romanova; Pavel Dodonov
- Past members: Vladimir Sigachov; Rustem Asanbayev; Rustam Karimov; Gennady Rodin; Nikita Zaytsev; Andrey Vasiliev; Vadim Kurilev; Sergey Ryjenko; Igor Dotsenko; Mikhail Chernov; Pavel Borisov
- Website: http://www.ddt.ru

DDT (or ДДТ in Cyrillic) is a Russian rock band. It was founded in 1980 by its lead singer and only remaining original member, Yuri Shevchuk (Russian: Юрий Шевчук), in Ufa (Bashkir ASSR, Russia, USSR).

== History ==
=== Ufa period (1980–1985) ===
The band was formed in 1980 in Ufa, Bashkir ASSR and originally consisted of five members:

- Yuri Shevchuk – vocals, guitar
- Vladimir Sigachyov – keyboard
- Rustem Asanbayev – guitar
- Gennady Rodin – bass guitar
- Rustam Karimov – percussion

In 1982, the Komsomolskaya Pravda newspaper sponsored a competition for young musicians called Zolotoy Kamerton (lit. 'Golden Tuning Fork'). DDT submitted three compositions – "Inoplanetyane" (Aliens), "Chyornoye solntse" (Black Sun), and "Ne streliaj!" ('Don't Shoot!'). During the long-running competition, the group published their first album (on tape), Svinya na raduge (Pig on a Rainbow). The album contained elements of rock and roll, blues and country music. At the time, popular music in the Soviet Union was split between "official" performers who were admitted to the musicians' union, and underground artists. Such underground artists were often highly trained musicians who also had other jobs. A complex underground network evolved in the 1980s, and "unofficial" music became widely distributed (though artist compensation was very limited) by magnitizdat, in a similar way to the underground channels that had existed for non-state sanctioned literature (samizdat).

DDT's submission to Zolotoy Kamerton reached the final round of the competition and the group was invited to perform in concert at Moscow's Orlyonok complex, together with the other finalist, Rok-sentyabr (Rock-September) from Cherepovets. DDT and three members of Rock-September, Vyacheslav Kobrin, Yevgeny Belozyorov and Andrey Maslennikov, soon produced a collaborative album (on tape), Monolog v Saigone (Monologue in Saigon), later renamed Kompromiss (Compromise). After recording the album, Sigachyov and Shevchuk returned to Ufa.

Sigachyov distanced himself from the group, while Shevchuk recruited new members including Rodin, drummer Sergey Rudoy, guitarist Rustam Rezvanov and keyboard player Vladislav Senchillo.

In May 1983, DDT performed at the Luzhniki Stadium in Moscow, as part of a three-day, sanctioned festival, Rok za mir (Rock for Peace). Their performance, however, was edited out of the official television program covering the event.

The band produced the album Periferia (Periphery) in April 1984. After recording the album, some members of the group landed on a KGB watch list and were subjected to government persecution. The band's music was banned, forcing them to go underground.

Although they never considered themselves political activists, Shevchuk always felt it was his duty as a citizen and songwriter to address both the strengths and weaknesses of the government, a difficult stance to take due to KGB persecution. DDT continued to work as a non-conformist group, producing albums and giving concerts throughout the country. This was challenging, as they received little if any money for the records they produced during this period, and very little for their concerts. Like other dissident artists, they survived through a combination of cleverness, perseverance, and help from their fans.

Shevchuk spent some time in Sverdlovsk (now Yekaterinburg), performing with the group Urfin Juis. In November 1985, DDT covertly recorded the album Vremya (Time) in Moscow with additional musicians, but the recording process was very difficult.

=== 1986–1997 ===
In 1986, Shevchuk moved to Leningrad (now Saint Petersburg) with his wife, son and mother. The move helped him to establish himself at the forefront of the Russian rock scene as the city was the center of a musical resurgence. In 1987, he recreated DDT. Its new members included:

- Vadim Kurilev – bass
- Andrei "Skinny" Vasiliev – guitar
- Igor Dotsenko – drums
- Nikita "Zoltsman" Zaitsev – violin, guitar
- Mikhail "Uncle Misha" Chernov – saxophone
- Andrey Muratov – keyboards

On January 23, 1987, the new lineup debuted on the stage of the Leningrad Rock Club. In June 1987, DDT performed at the Leningrad Rock Festival in front of a crowd of 3,000 crammed into a venue with a capacity of 1,000.

In the summer of 1988, DDT toured across Russia and recorded a new album, Ya poluchil etu rol (I was given this role), which contained some songs from their old albums re-recorded in a professional studio. In 1988, the band also made their first visit to the US; their concert in Los Angeles was covered by MTV.

In 1989, they went on tour with the band Alisa, performing at a rock festival in Hungary. In 1990, DDT performed several concerts in the US and Japan. Also in 1990, the band released Ottepel (Thaw), which presented their first concert from Saint Petersburg. They also participated in a Viktor Tsoi tribute concert, after the renowned singer-songwriter died in a car accident on August 15, 1990.

After the Soviet Union's collapse in 1991, DDT attracted an even greater following both at home and abroad, as their albums and concerts began to be broadcast and publicized more widely. In 1991, the band recorded another album, the keyboard-heavy Plastun ('A crawling soldier'; originally the name of a Cossack infantry unit), but after many months of work Shevchuk decided to shelve it and the album was not released until 1995, four years later.

In 1992 DDT released the album Aktrisa Vesna (Spring, the actress). This lyrical album, which was dedicated to Shevchuk's deceased wife, Elmira, met with great success. It contained some of the band's greatest hits, including "Shto takoe osen" (What is autumn), "Dozhd" (Rain), and "Rodina" (Motherland). After releasing the album, the band toured extensively. Soon afterwards it began to change its sound and performance strategy by adding "programmes" – conceptually prepared concerts – to its repertoire. During December 1992 and January 1993, DDT presented its first programme, Chyorny pyos Peterburg (Black mongrel Petersburg), and toured widely in CIS countries. On May 27, 1993, on the anniversary of the founding of Saint Petersburg, the band performed a free concert in Dvortsovaya Square, which was attended by 120,000 people.

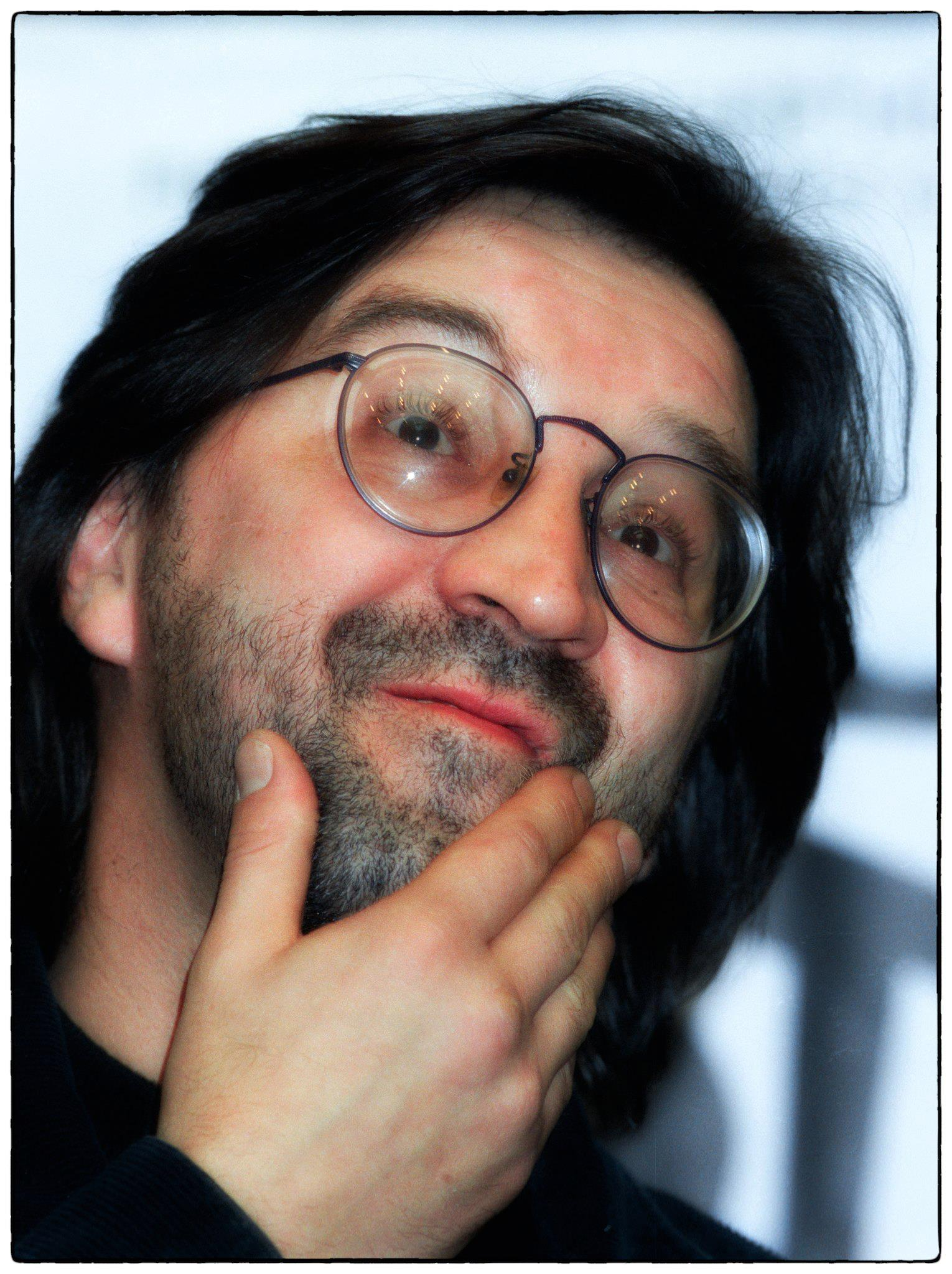
Yuri Shevchuk says that the 1990s changed him a lot

In the beginning of 1994, a new album, Eto vsyo... (That's all...), was recorded. The musicians had planned to make a double album, but because of challenging deadlines and an unstable lineup, a significant amount of early musical material and recordings did not make it into the final version. Years later, the songs were included in the band's album Rozhdyonny v SSSR (Born in the USSR).

During the summer of 1994, DDT took part in the White Nights of Saint Petersburg rock festival in Berlin. That autumn, the group was awarded the Ovatsiya ('Ovation') award for Best Rock Group of the Year. Yuri Shevchuk was also named Best Rock Musician of the Year.

In January 1995, during First Chechen War, Shevchuk went on a peace mission to Chechnya, where he performed 50 concerts for Russian troops and Chechen citizens alike. On June 25, 1995, DDT performed a 15th anniversary concert in Petrovsky Stadium, attracting an audience of tens of thousands of fans. Afterwards, the group toured with its newest programme, Ot i do (From and to). At the end of the winter of 1995–1996, the group spent time working in a recording studio in the US.

In February–March 1996, DDT recorded a new album, Lyubov (Love), at Long View Farm in Massachusetts with two new musicians: bassist I. Tikhomirov (from the group Kino) and keyboard player D. Galitsky.

In the summer of 1996, after returning from the US, the group headlined several festivals, including VladiROCKstok, the first large-scale international music festival in the formerly closed city of Vladivostok on the Sea of Japan.

=== 1998–2004 ===
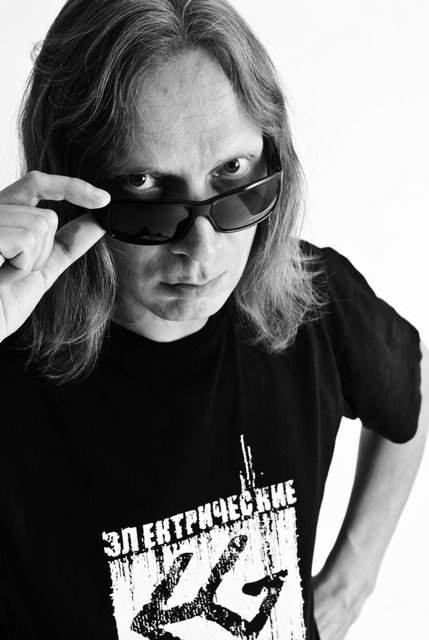
Vadim Kurylev played guitars in DDT from 1986 to 2002

In May 1998, the band released a new album titled Mir nomer nol (World number zero) – a concept album which contained influences from industrial music and relied heavily on electronic, computer-generated music. With this program DDT lost some of their old fans but found a huge success among younger listeners – which Shevchuk and DDT were very pleased by. The Mir nomer nol tour included about 70 cities in Russia and overseas. A new album, Metel avgusta (Snowstorm of August), contained mostly outtakes from Mir nomer nol as well as more lyrical songs.

Since then, the band has won a number of Russian music awards and been awarded humanitarian citations for their creative and charitable work. Shevchuk and his group also regularly travel throughout the CIS and other former Soviet republics giving benefit concerts. In the spring and summer of 2002, 10 out of 11 concerts the band played were benefits for various social and cultural organizations. The band has reached an ever-growing audience in the US and Europe, and in the first two decades of the 21st century have traveled frequently throughout the world, playing concerts and gaining new fans. Shevchuk's music and lyrics are not only influenced by traditional Western rock music, but also by the entire scope of Russian folk, classical, and religious music. In many respects, Shevchuk's initial years of struggle as an underground musicians shaped his and, by extension, the band's philosophy toward their art. The question of the music's marketability was never part of the song writing process as there was no market in which to compete but only an allegiance to the purity of artistic expression.

In 2002 and 2003 DDT released a double album called Yedinochestvo (Solitude), which was even more experimental than Mir nomer nol. After the following tour, Vadim Kurilev, the band's guitarist and bassist from its original Saint Petersburg lineup, left the group to begin a solo career. One of Kurilev's last performances as a DDT member was released on the CD Gorod bez okon (A city without windows).

=== 2005–present ===
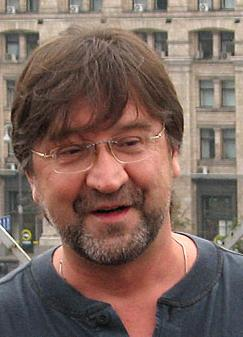
Yuri Shevchuk in 2007

In 2005, DDT celebrated their 25th anniversary with an extended tour throughout Russia, Europe, and North America, and the release of a new album entitled Propavshiy bez vesti (Missing in action), which received critical acclaim.

In 2007 DDT released the album Prekrasnaya lyubov (Beautiful love), a collection of previously unreleased songs which had been performed by the group for many years in addition to several new songs. The album differs from previous albums, representing a greater focus on political and social themes versus the more common ideas in their other albums. Many songs are in the chanson style.

On March 3, 2008, DDT performed at the Dissenters' March in St. Petersburg to protest the controversial election of Dmitry Medvedev as President of Russia. Subsequently, in May 2010 Shevchuk received considerable media attention following a pointed dialogue with Prime Minister Vladimir Putin in which he openly confronted him (on state television) with questions regarding such controversial topics as democracy, freedom of speech, assembly, and freedom of the press in Russia.

On September 24 and 26, 2008, DDT presented an anti-war program called Ne streliaj! (Don't Shoot!). These concerts (featuring bands from Georgia, South Ossetia and Ukraine) were dedicated to the casualties of wars, particularly victims of the war in South Ossetia. The concert in Saint Petersburg was shown on TV by Channel 5 without commercial breaks.

In the summer of 2009, DDT participated in the "Rok nad Volgoy" festival ("Rock above the Volga") in Samara and in the international music festival "Sotvorenie mira" (Creation of the World) in Kazan. On September 2, 2009, the band performed on VVC Square to protest the demolition of historical buildings in Moscow.

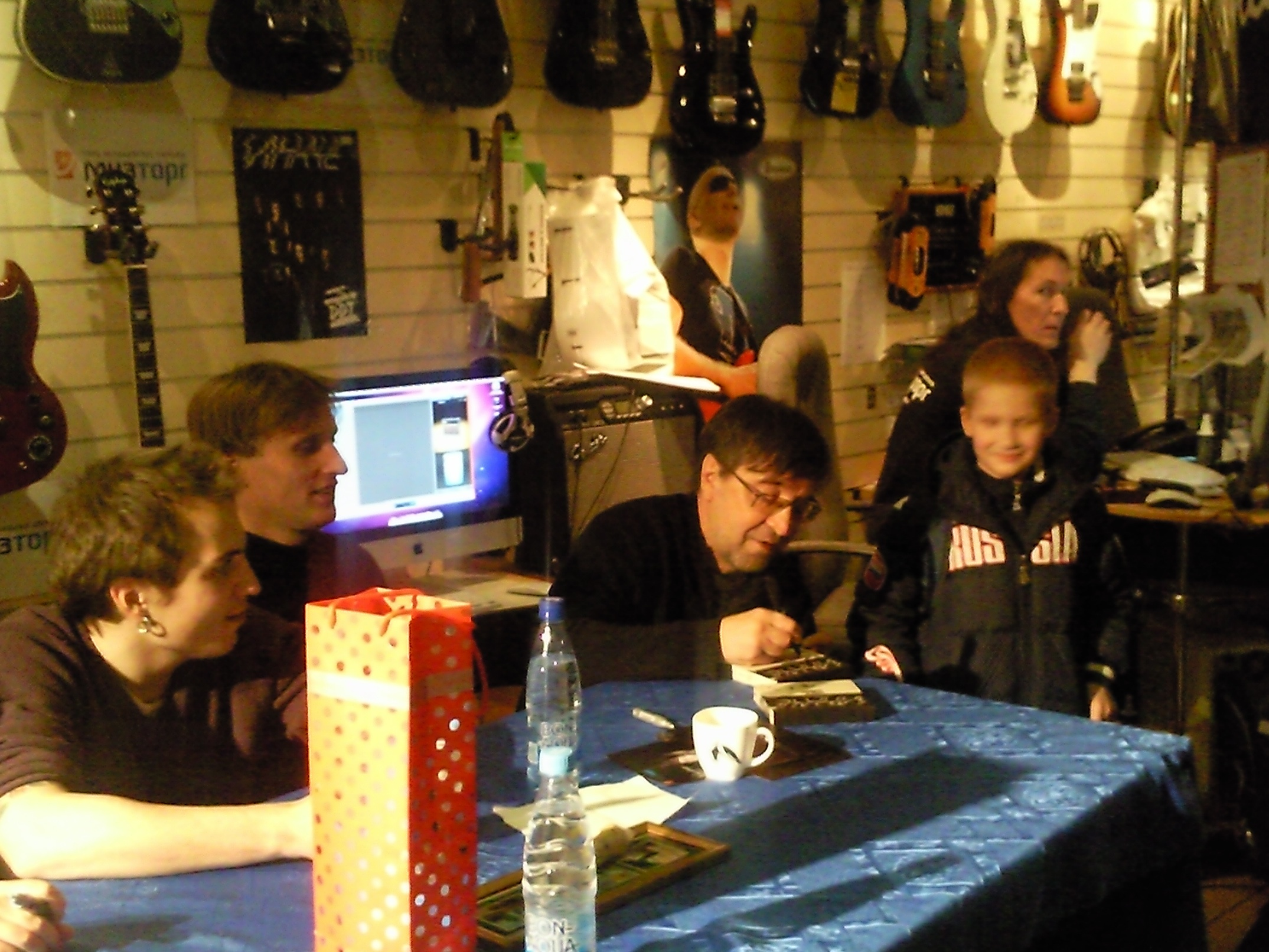
DDT during an autograph session in Moscow, 2011

By the time DDT began to record its next studio album, Shevchuk was the only member left from its original Petersburg line-up. He brought together a brand-new team:

- Konstantin "The Cat" Shumailov - keyboards;
- Alex Fedichev - lead guitar;
- Artyom Mamay - drums, vibraphone;
- Roman Nevelev - bass;
- Anton Vishnyakov - trombone, tambourine, shaker;
- Alena Romanova - backing vocals

In 2011, DDT released the concept album Inache (Otherwise). According to Shevchuk, the album's central theme is freedom in all its forms and the lyrical hero is a Prince Hamlet of the 21st century which has no doubt regarding the question "To be, or not to be?". He clearly knows: "To be!", but the question remains - "In which way?"

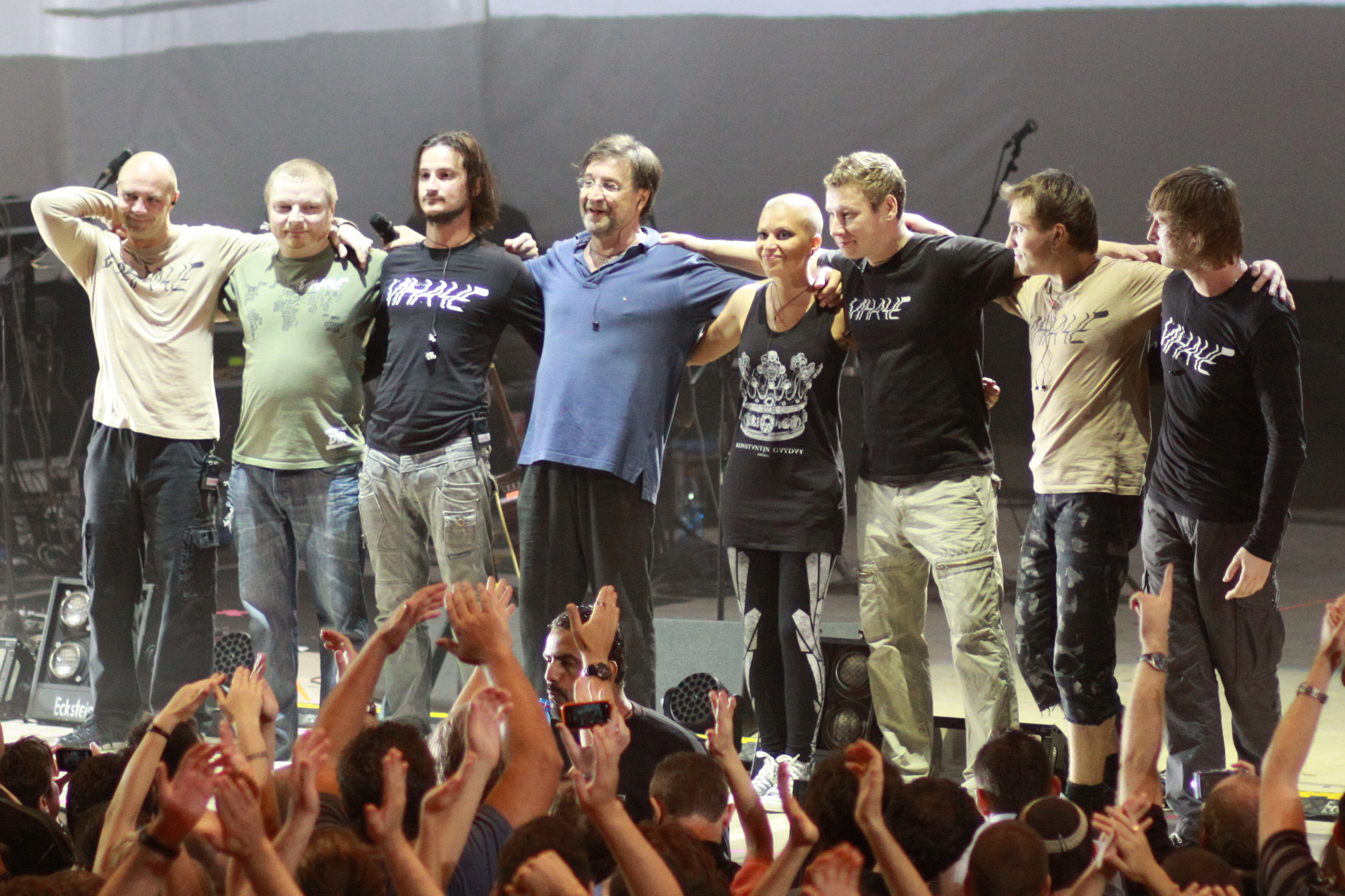
DDT in Israel during the Inache 2012 tour

The band embarked on a large, successful tour which lasted from 2011 to 2014. On April 5, 2012, DDT released a film titled Nebo pod serdtsem (The sky under the heart) a compilation of behind-the-scenes and concert footage from the band's performance at the "Olympic Stadium". This was the first multiple-camera concert films made in Russia. Later that year, the band took part in the rock festival The Best City UA in Dnipropetrovsk. In 2013, the band toured in Germany, performing at Tempodrom in Berlin and at Grugahalle in Essen. A concert in Essen was later released on CD+DVD in 2014.

DDT always was and still is one of the most popular rock groups in Russia, and their concerts typically attract tens of thousands of fans. Shevchuk put together the first incarnation of the band in the summer of 1980, and although its members have changed over the years, he continues to voice the concerns and frustrations of the Russian people in his music today just as he did in the band's infancy. The more than 20 albums in DDT's discography not only chronicle the history of a rock group, but also provide poignant narratives that examine many aspects of life in the Soviet Union and Russia during the past 35 years.

== Members ==
=== Current members ===
- Yuriy Shevchuk – vocals, acoustic guitar, 12-string guitar, guitar, poems, main musical themes (1980–present)
- Konstantin Shumailov – keyboards, samplers, programming, backing vocals (1996–present)
- Alexey Fedichev – lead guitar, mandolin, ukulele, backing vocals (2003–present)
- Pavel Dodonov – guitar (2020–present)
- Artem Mamay – drums, vibraphone, bass guitar, keyboards (2010–present)
- Roman Nevelev – bass guitar (2011–present)
- Anton Vishnyakov – trombone, backing vocals, tambourine, shaker (2010–present)
- Alyona Romanova – backing vocals, voice, vocals, kaluka (2010–present)

=== Former members ===
- Rinat Shamsutdinov – drums (1979–1980)
- Rustem Asanbayev – guitar (1979–1983)
- Gennady Rodin – bass guitar (1979–1984)
- Vladimir Sigachev – keyboards (1979–1987)
- Rustem Karimov – drums (1981–1983)
- Niyaz Abdyushev – bass (1984–1986)
- Sergei Rudoy – drums (1984–1986)
- Sergey Letov – saxophone (1985–1987)
- Sergey Ryzhenko – guitar, violin, keyboards, recorder (1985, 1994–1995)
- Andrey Vasiliev – guitar (1986–1998)
- Vadim Kurylev – guitar, bass guitar, recorder, harmonica, balalaika, accordion, organ (1986–2002)
- Igor Dotsenko – drums (1986–2010)
- Nikita Zaitsev – guitar, violin (1987–2000)
- Andrey Muratov – keyboards, organ (1987–1993)
- Igor Tikhomirov – bass guitar, sitar (1995–1998)
- Mikhail Chernov – saxophone, flute, bass clarinet, svirel, kurai (1988–2010)
- Pavel Borisov – bass guitar, double bass (1998–2011)
- Ivan Vasiliev – trumpet (1999–2014)

== Discography ==
=== Studio albums ===
Transliterated title	Original title	Translation	Year of release
Svinya na raduge	Свинья на радуге	Pig on a rainbow	1982
Kompromiss	Компромисс	Compromise	1983
Periferiya	Периферия	Periphery	1984
Vremya	Время	Time	1985
Ya poluchil etu rol	Я получил эту роль	I got this role	1988
Ottepel	Оттепель	Thaw	1990
Plastun	Пластун	Plastun is a Cossack infantryman, scout or sentinel	1991
Aktrisa Vesna	Актриса Весна	Spring the Actress	1992
Eto vsyo...	Это всё...	That's All...	1994
Lyubov	Любовь	Love	1996
Rozhdyonny v SSSR	Рождённый в СССР	Born in the USSR	1997
Mir nomer nol	Мир номер ноль	World Number Zero	1999
Metel avgusta	Метель августа	Snowstorm of August	2000
Yedinochestvo I	Единочество I	Loneliness/Singleness I	2002
Yedinochestvo II. Zhivoy.	Единочество II. Живой.	Loneliness/Singleness II. Alive.	2003
Propavshy bez vesti	Пропавший без вести	Vanished Without a Trace (Also: Missing in action)	2005
Prekrasnaya lyubov	Прекрасная любовь	Wonderful Love	2007
Inache	Иначе	Otherwise	2011
Prozrachnii	Прозрачный	Transparent	2014
Galya Hody	Галя ходи	Galya Move on	2018
Tvorchestvo v pustote	Творчество в пустоте	Creativity in the Emptiness	2021
Tvorchestvo v pustote - 2	Творчество в пустоте - 2	Creativity in the Emptiness - 2	2022

=== Live albums ===
Transliterated title	Original title	Translation	Year of release
Chyorny pyos Peterburg	Чёрный пёс Петербург	Black Mongrel Petersburg	1993
Gorod bez okon. Vkhod.	Город без окон. Вход.	City Without Windows. Entrance.	2004
Gorod bez okon. Vykhod.	Город без окон. Выход.	City Without Windows. Exit.	2004
Live in Essen 2013	Live in Essen 2013	Live in Essen 2013	2014
Prozrachnii. Koncert v Minske	Прозрачный. Концерт в Минске	Transparent. Live in Minsk	2017

=== Compilations ===
Transliterated title	Original title	Translation	Year of release
Prosvistela	Просвистела	(It) whistled by	1999
Pesni	Песни	Songs	2003
Ne strelyay!	Не стреляй!	Don't Shoot!	2008
Istoriya zvuka	История звука	History of sound	2017

=== Singles ===
Transliterated title	Original title	Translation	Year of release
Eto vsyo	Это всё	That's All (or: This is all)	1995
Mir nomer nol	Мир номер ноль	World Number Zero	1998
Stary god	Старый год	Last Year (lit. Old Year)	2007
2020	2020	2020	2020
V posteli	В постели	In bed	2021
Novosti	Новости	News	2023
Dolgo...	Долго...	Long...	2024

== Sources ==
- Makhmutov, Nail (2015). Po "sledam" legend ufimskogo rok-n-rolla По "следам" легенд уфимского рок-н-ролла [On the "trail" of the legends of Ufa rock-n-roll] (in Russian). Ufa: Leto. ISBN 978-5-87-308166-0. OCLC 1392002455. Archived from the original on September 17, 2016. 290 pages.
